= 2016 C.R.D. Libolo season =

Recreativo do Libolo
2016 season
- President: (Angola) Rui Campos
- Manager: João Paulo Costa (Jun 2015–Nov 2016)
- Stadium: Estádio Municipal de Calulo
- League: 3rd
- Angola Cup: Winner
- Angola Super Cup: Winner
- CAF Champions League: R16
- Top goalscorer: League: Luiz Phellype (7); All: Luiz Phellype (13)
- Biggest win: Libolo 6–0 Maquis (7 Feb 2016)
- Biggest defeat: Al Ahly 2–0 Libolo (19 Mar 2016)
Home colours	Away colours	Third colours
- All statistics correct as of 2 September 2016.

The 2016 season of Clube Recreativo e Desportivo do Libolo was the club's 11th season in Angolan football, and the 9th consecutive season in the Girabola, the top flight of Angolan football. In 2016, the club participated in the Angola Super Cup, Girabola, Angola Cup and the CAF Champions League.

== Squad information ==
=== Players ===
No.	Nat	Nick	Name	Pos	Date of birth (age)
Goalkeepers
1	(Portugal)	Ricardo	Ricardo Jorge Cecília Batista	–	19 November 1986 (aged 30)
12	(Angola)	Manaia	Valter Américo dos Santos Manaia	–	24 March 1981 (aged 35)
22	(Angola)	Landu	Landu Mavanga	–	4 January 1990 (aged 26)
29	(Angola)	Nílton	Nilton Jorge Paulo	–	23 May 1989 (aged 27)
Defenders
2	(Angola)	Natael	Natael Paulo Masuekama	LB	23 September 1993 (aged 23)
4	(Cameroon)	Edy Boyom	Edward Nicolas M'Boyom	CB	12 December 1988 (aged 28)
6	(Angola)	Celson	Celso João Barros Costa	CB	5 October 1986 (aged 30)
16	(Angola)	Boka	Boka Nelson Filho	CB	26 February 1987 (aged 29)
18	(Angola)	Eddie	Eddie Marcos Melo Afonso	RB	7 March 1994 (aged 22)
21	(Angola)	Jaime	Jaime Miguel Linares	CB	21 May 1982 (aged 34)
25	(Angola)	Kuagica	Kuagica David Bondo	CB	10 August 1990 (aged 26)
26	(Angola)	Pataca	Bernardo Fernando Pataca da Silva	RB	30 November 1990 (aged 26)
27	(Angola)	Carlitos	Carlos Miguel Gomes de Almeida	RB	24 September 1988 (aged 28)
Midfielders
3	(Brazil)	Wíres	Wíres José de Souza	CM	30 December 1982 (aged 34)
7	(Cape Verde)	Brito	Armindo Rodrigues Mendes Furtado	LW	16 November 1987 (aged 29)
8	(Cape Verde)	Sidnei (c)	Sidnei dos Santos Reis Mariano	RM	21 April 1986 (aged 30)
10	(Angola)	Dany	Silas Daniel Satonho	RM	14 January 1990 (aged 26)
11	(Angola)	Nandinho	Wilson Fernandes Augusto Macamo	MF	17 September 1985 (aged 31)
14	(Angola)	Ito	Mário Manuel de Oliveira	CM	29 November 1994 (aged 22)
16	(Angola)	Fredy	Alfredo Kulembe Ribeiro	RW	27 March 1990 (aged 26)
17	(Angola)	Cabibi I	Leonardo Manuel Isola Ramos	RW	23 December 1992 (aged 24)
19	(Angola)	Erivaldo	Erivaldo Jorge Paulo Ferreira	RW	8 February 1994 (aged 22)
20	(Angola)	Dário	Dário de Sousa Borges Cardoso	LM	25 June 1982 (aged 34)
23	(Republic of the Congo)	Kaya	Julsy Boukama-Kaya	MF	5 February 1993 (aged 23)
30	(Angola)	Adilson	Adilson Kivão	MF	27 September 1994 (aged 22)
30	(Angola)	Luís	Luís Cardoso	MF	8 March 1995 (aged 21)
Forwards
9	(Brazil)	Luiz Phellype	Luiz Phellype Luciano Silva	–	27 September 1993 (aged 23)
24	(France)	Diawara	Diawara	–	26 July 1989 (aged 27)

=== Staff ===
Nat	Name	Position(s)	Date of birth (age)
Technical staff
(Portugal)	João Paulo Costa	Head coach	25 June 1972 (aged 44)
(Portugal)	Pedro Caravela	Assistant coach	21 December 1976 (aged 40)
(Portugal)	Pedro Sacramento	Assistant coach	5 June 1983 (aged 33)
(Portugal)	Jorge Silva	Goalkeeper coach	13 January 1972 (aged 44)
(Angola)	Fernando Pereira	Goalkeeper coach	12 December 1973 (aged 43)
Medical
(Portugal)	David Nogueira	Physician	–
(Portugal)	Tiago Ramos	Physio	–
(Angola)	Fernando Caetano	Masseur	–
Management
(Angola)	Rui Costa Campos	Chairman	1 June 1959 (aged 57)
(Angola)	Augusto Correia	Vice-Chairman	–
(Angola)	Cacharamba Jr	Head of Foot Dept	–

=== Pre-season transfers ===
No.	Nat	Nick	Name	Pos	Date of birth (age)	To / from
Transfers out
7	(Cape Verde)	Brito	Armindo Rodrigues Mendes Furtado	MF	16 November 1987 (aged 29)	(Portugal) C.S. Marítimo
10	(Angola)	Dany	Silas Daniel Satonho	RM	14 January 1990 (aged 26)	(Albania) Luftëtari Gjirokastër
4	(Cameroon)	Edy Boyom	Edward Nicolas M'Boyom	CB	12 December 1988 (aged 28)	(Cyprus) AEL Limassol
26	(Angola)	Pataca	Bernardo Fernando Pataca da Silva	RB	30 November 1990 (aged 26)	(Angola) Kabuscorp
Transfers in
17	(Angola)	Cabibi I	Leonardo Manuel Isola Ramos	MF	23 December 1992 (aged 24)	(Angola) Domant FC
19	(Angola)	Erivaldo	Erivaldo Jorge Paulo Ferreira	MF	8 February 1994 (aged 22)	(Portugal) C.D. Feirense
14	(Angola)	Ito	Mário Manuel de Oliveira	CM	29 November 1994 (aged 22)	(Angola) Progresso Sambizanga
21	(Angola)	Jaime	Jaime Miguel Linares	DF	21 May 1982 (aged 34)	(Angola) Progresso Sambizanga
5	(Brazil)	Luiz Phellype	Luiz Phellype Luciano Silva	FW	27 September 1993 (aged 23)	(Portugal) G.D. Estoril Praia

=== Mid-season transfers ===
No.	Nat	Nick	Name	Pos	Date of birth (age)	From
Transfers in
16	(Angola)	Boka	Boka Nelson Filho	MF	26 February 1987 (aged 29)	(Angola) Recreativo Caála
23	(Republic of the Congo)	Kaya	Julsy Boukama-Kaya	MF	5 February 1993 (aged 23)	(Portugal) Casa Pia A.C.
11	(Angola)	Nandinho	Wilson Fernandes Augusto Macamo	MF	17 September 1985 (aged 31)	(Angola) Interclube

== Angola Super Cup ==
7 February 2016
16:00

Recreativo Libolo	6–0	Bravos do Maquis
Fredy 20'; Sidnei 28'; Kuagica 58'; Brito 63'; Phellype 82'; Erivaldo 89'	Report

Estádio dos Coqueiros, Luanda
Attendance: 2,700
Referee: Benjamin Andrade

Libolo	Maquis

GK	1	(Portugal) Ricardo
RB	18	(Angola) Eddie
CB	4	(Cameroon) Edy Boyom
CB	25	(Angola) Kuagica	(yellow card) 45'
LB	2	(Angola) Natael
RM	8	(Cape Verde) Sidnei (c)
CM	?	(Angola) Yuri
CM	16	(Angola) Fredy		(substituted off) 67'
LM	7	(Cape Verde) Brito		(substituted off) 60'
CF	9	(Brazil) Luiz Phellype
CF	10	(Angola) Danny		(substituted off) 64'
Substitutions:
MF	19	(Angola) Erivaldo		(substituted on) 60'
FW	24	(France) Diawara		(substituted on) 64'
FW	17	(Angola) Cabibi I		(substituted on) 67'
Manager:
(Portugal) João Paulo Costa

GK	1	(Angola) Lami
RB	–	(Angola) Victor
CB	–	(Angola) Yuri
CB	24	(Angola) Ikuma
LB	–	(Angola) Bobista
RM	–	(Cape Verde) Valter
CM	13	(Argentina) Ávalos (c)
CM	–	(Democratic Republic of the Congo) Tshukuma	(yellow card) 55'	(substituted off) 70'
LM	–	(Angola) Ndó
CF	–	(Angola) Vado
CF	–	(Angola) Choi		(substituted off) 61'
Substitutions:
FW	11	(Angola) Joelson		(substituted on) 61'
FW	15	(Angola) Higino		(substituted on) 70'
Manager:
(Angola) Mariano Júlio

Assistant referees:
Bernabé Ngulo
Judith Mestre
Fourth official:
Mauro de Oliveira

== Angolan League ==
=== League table ===
Pos	Team	Pld	W	D	L	GF	GA	GD	Pts	Qualification or relegation
1	Primeiro de Agosto (C)	30	20	6	4	60	22	+38	66	Qualification for Champions League
2	Petro de Luanda	30	19	7	4	37	14	+23	64	
3	Recreativo do Libolo	30	17	9	4	49	26	+23	60	
4	Progresso LS	30	13	7	10	25	20	+5	46	
5	Kabuscorp	30	13	7	10	30	24	+6	46	
6	Benfica Luanda	30	13	5	12	29	24	+5	44	
7	Interclube	30	11	8	11	28	32	−4	41	
8	Progresso do Sambizanga	30	8	15	7	23	23	0	39	
9	Sagrada Esperança	30	9	10	11	23	23	0	37	
10	Desportivo da Huíla	30	10	6	14	29	39	−10	36	
11	Recreativo da Caála	30	8	10	12	27	26	+1	34	
12	Académica do Lobito	30	9	7	14	26	38	−12	34	
13	ASA	30	10	3	17	28	43	−15	33	
14	4 de Abril (R)	30	6	13	11	21	27	−6	31	Relegation to Provincial stages
15	Primeiro de Maio (R)	30	7	8	15	24	44	−20	29	Relegation to Provincial stages
16	Porcelana FC (R)	30	5	3	22	14	48	−34	18	Relegation to Provincial stages

Updated to match(es) played on 5 November 2016. Source: Girabola.com
Rules for classification: 1) Points; 2) Head-to-head points; 3) Head-to-head goal difference; 4) Goal difference; 5) Goals scored; 6) Fair-play points; 7) Play-off.
(C) Champions; (R) Relegated

=== Results ===
==== Results summary ====
Overall								Home						Away					
Pld	W	D	L	GF	GA	GD	Pts	W	D	L	GF	GA	GD	W	D	L	GF	GA	GD
30	17	9	4	49	26	+23	60	10	5	0	28	10	+18	7	4	4	21	16	+5

Last updated: 5 Nov 2016.

==== Results by round ====
Round	1	2	3	4	5	6	7	8	9	10	11	12	13	14	15	16	17	18	19	20	21	22	23	24	25	26	27	28	29	30
Ground	A	H	A	H	A	H	A	H	A	H	A	H	H	A	H	H	A	H	A	H	A	H	A	H	A	H	A	A	H	A
Result	W	D	W	W	D	W	L	D	D	W	D	D	W	W	W	W	W	W	L	D	W	D	D	W	W	W	L	W	W	L
Position	5	4	3	4	8	4	6	7	9	3	2	4	2	2	2	2	2	2	2	2	2	2	2	2	2	2	3	3	3	3

Updated to match(es) played on 5 Nov 2016. Source: www.girabola.com
A = Away; H = Home; W = Win; D = Draw; L = Loss

=== Match details ===
Sun, 21 Feb 2016 01	1º de Maio	2–4	Rec do Libolo	Edelfride Costa, Benguela
15:30 WAT (UTC+1)	Filipe 21' 62'; Edson (yellow card) 35'	Report	Kuagica (yellow card) 20'; Brito 23' 41' 46'; Wíres (yellow card) 74'; Cabibi I 90+3'	Attendance: 5.000; Referee: João Ngoma; Luís Mateus, Celestino Golombole
Note: Ricardo / E.Boyom, Eddie, Kuagica, Natael / Dário, Fredy, Sidnei (substituted off) 65', Wíres (substituted off) 90' / Phellype, Brito (substituted off) 75' — Dany (substituted on) 65', Cabibi I (substituted on) 75', Celson (substituted on) 90'

Wed, 2 Mar 2016 02	Rec do Libolo	1–1	Kabuscorp	Estádio Municipal, Calulo
16:00 WAT (UTC+1)	Phellype 36'; Wíres (yellow card) 63'; Edy Boyom (yellow card) 77'	Report	Magola 49'; Mingo Sanda (yellow card) 86'	Attendance: 5.000; Referee: Romualdo Baltazar; Jerson Emiliano dos Santos, Estanislau Guedes
Note: Ricardo / E.Boyom, Eddie, Kuagica, Natael (substituted off) 19' / Fredy, Sidnei (c), Wíres, Dário (substituted off) 76' / Phellype, Brito (substituted off) 66' — Ito (substituted on) 19', Erivaldo (substituted on) 66', Diawara (substituted on) 76'

Sat, 5 Mar 2016 03	Interclube	1–2	Rec do Libolo	22 de Junho, Benguela
15:30 WAT (UTC+1)	Moco 11'	Report	40' Dany; 41' Erivaldo	Attendance: 5.000; Referee: António Dungula; Tito Capingalo, Barnabé Ngulo
Note: Ricardo / E.Boyom, Eddie, Kuagica, Ito / Dário (c), Fredy, Wíres, Dany (substituted off) 86' / Erivaldo (substituted off) 53', Diawara (substituted off) 60' — Brito (substituted on) 53', Phellype (substituted on) 60', Celson (substituted on) 86'

Mon, 4 Apr 2016 06	Rec do Libolo	1–0	Benfica Luanda	Estádio Municipal, Calulo
18:00 WAT (UTC+1)	Edy Boyom 3'	Report		Attendance: 1.000; Referee: Benjamim Andrade; Bernabé Ngulo, Judith Mestre
Note: Ricardo / E.Boyom, Eddie, Kuagica, Natael / Dário, Wíres, Fredy (substituted off) 65', Sidnei (substituted off) 75' / Erivaldo, Phellype (substituted off) 82' — Dany (substituted on) 65', Diawara (substituted on) 75', Cabibi I (substituted on) 82'

Sun, 10 Apr 2016 07	1º de Agosto	3–1	Rec do Libolo	11 de Novembro, Luanda
18:00 WAT (UTC+1)	Gelson 32' 61' 86'; Dominique (yellow card) 63'; Isaac (yellow card) 73'; Sargento (yellow card) 74'; Dani (yellow card) 75'	Report	Diawara 89'; Fredy (yellow card) 66'; Dany (yellow card) 82'	Referee: José Álvaro; Jerson Emiliano, Estanislau Guedes
Note: Ricardo / Eddie, Kuagica, Pataca (substituted off) 45', E.Boyom (substituted off) 77' / Dário, Fredy, Sidnei, Wíres / Phellype, Erivaldo (substituted off) 12' — Dany (substituted on) 12', Diawara (substituted on) 45', Cabibi I (substituted on) 77'

Wed, 13 Apr 2016 05	Petro Atlético	1–1	Rec do Libolo	11 de Novembro, Calulo
16:00 WAT (UTC+1)	Balacai (yellow card) 55'; Herenilson (yellow card) 65'; Diógenes 75'; Miguel (yellow card) 83'; Jiresse (yellow card) 84'	Report	Edy Boyom (yellow card) 30'; Danny 80'	Attendance: 5.000; Referee: Osvaldo Felix; José Felix, Sebastião da Silva
Note: Ricardo / E.Boyom, Kuagica, Natael, Eddie (substituted off) 74' / Celson, Dário, Sidnei, Fredy (substituted off) 61' / Diawara, Phellype — Dany (substituted on) 61', Brito (substituted on) 74'

Sun, 17 Apr 2016 08	Rec do Libolo	2–2	4 de Abril	Estádio Municipal, Calulo
15:00 WAT (UTC+01)	Dário 68'; Kuagica 90'	Report	Prazeres (yellow card) 69' (yellow-red card) 86'; Manucho 72'; Dany (yellow card) 74' (goal) 80'	Attendance: 5.000; Referee: Pedro Futa; Domingos Cordeiro, José Sebastião
Note: Ricardo / E.Boyom, Kuagica, Natael, Carlitos (substituted off) 84' / Celson (substituted off) 45', Dário, Kaya, Dany (substituted off) 75', / Diawara, Phellype — Brito (substituted on) 45', Diawara (substituted on) 75', Cabibi I (substituted on) 84'

Sat, 23 Apr 2016 09	Académica Lobito	1–1	Rec do Libolo	Estádio do Buraco, Lobito
15:30 WAT (UTC+1)	Cláudio 20'		Brito 40'	Referee: Rodrigues Aleixo; Nicodemos Calembela, Pedro Van-Dúnem
Note: Ricardo / Carlitos (substituted off) 77', E.Boyom, Kuagica, Natael / Brito, Dário, Sidnei (substituted off) 76', Wíres / Cabibi I (substituted off) 47', Diawara — Phellype (substituted on) 47', Danny (substituted on) 76', Eddie (substituted on) 77'

Wed, 27 Apr 2016 04	Rec do Libolo	4–0	ASA	Estádio Municipal, Calulo
15:00 WAT (UTC+1)	Fredy 27' 52'; Diawara 29'; Dário 50'	Report		Attendance: 4.500; Referee: António Caxala; Júlio Lemos, Tomás Lima
Note: Ricardo / Carlitos, E.Boyom, Jaime, Natael / Fredy, Wíres, Brito (substituted off) 67', Dário (substituted off) 67', Sidnei (substituted off) 71' / Diawara — Cabibi I (substituted on) 67', Phellype (substituted on) 67', Ito (substituted on) 71'

Mon, 2 May 2016 10	Rec do Libolo	2–1	Progresso LS	Estádio Municipal, Calulo
15:00 WAT (UTC+1)	Edy Boyom 24'; Wíres (yellow card) 32'; Fredy 40' (pen.) (yellow card) 90+1'	Report	Lopes 10'; Ndié (yellow card) 38'	Attendance: 4.500; Referee: Carlos Lopes; Armando da Silva, Manuel Lobe
Note: Ricardo / Carlitos, E.Boyom, Jaime, Natael / Fredy, Wíres, Brito (substituted off) 68', Dário (substituted off) 81', Sidnei (substituted off) 87' / Diawara — Erivaldo (substituted on) 68', Dany (substituted on) 81', Kuagica (substituted on) 87'

Sun, 8 May 2016 11	Rec da Caála	0–0	Rec do Libolo	Mártires da Canhala, Caála
16:00 WAT (UTC+1)	Paizinho (yellow card) 20'; Dudú (yellow card) 60'	Report	Dário (yellow card) 30'; Diawara (yellow card) 70'	Attendance: 5.000; Referee: Nuno Eduardo; Manuel Benguela, Nilton Armando
Note: Landu / Carlitos, E.Boyom, Eddie, Kuagica / Sidnei (c), Wíres, Fredy (substituted off) 69', Dário (substituted off) 87' / Diawara, Erivaldo (substituted off) 76' — Phellype (substituted on) 69', Cabibi I (substituted on) 76', Natael (substituted on) 87'

Mon, 16 May 2016 12	Rec do Libolo	2–2	Progresso	Estádio Municipal, Calulo
16:00 WAT (UTC+01:00)	Diawara 48'; Sidnei 83'	Report	Ndieu (yellow card) 45'; Viet 57'; Luís Tati (yellow card) 64'; Yano 76'	Attendance: 4.500; Referee: Hélder Martins; Júlio Lemos, Joaquim da Rocha
Note: Landu / Carlitos, E.Boyom, Eddie, Kuagica / Sidnei, Wíres, Dário, Fredy (substituted off) 11' / Diawara, Erivaldo (substituted off) 80' — Brito (substituted on) 11' (substituted off) 72', Phellype (substituted on) 72', Dany (substituted on) 80'

Sun, 22 May 2016 13	Rec do Libolo	2–0	Sagrada Esperança	Estádio Municipal, Calulo
15:00 WAT (UTC+1)	Dário 54' 62'			Referee: Conceição Matias; Ivan do Nascimento, Celestino Golombole
Note: Landu / Carlitos (substituted off) , E.Boyom (substituted off) , Kuagica, Natael / Dário, Eddie, Sidnei, Wíres / Diawara (substituted off) , Erivaldo — Jaime (substituted on) , Danny (substituted on) , Phellype (substituted on)

Wed, 25 May 2016 15	Rec do Libolo	1–0	Desportivo Huíla	Estádio Municipal, Calulo
15:30 WAT (UTC+1)	Sidnei 55'			Referee: Luciano Lucas

Sun, 29 May 2016 14	Porcelana FC	1–4	Rec do Libolo	Santos Dinis, Ndalatando
15:00 WAT (UTC+1)	Djamini 88'		Diawara 13'; Wíres 20'; Dário 26'; Dany 83'

Sat, 9 Jul 2016 16	Rec do Libolo	3–0	1º de Maio	Estádio Municipal, Calulo
15:00 WAT (UTC+1)	Kuagica (red card) 57'; Erivaldo 68'; Dário (yellow card) 85'; Phellype 87' 91'	Report	Bugo Jazz (yellow card) 47'	Attendance: 5.000; Referee: Hélder Calenga; Elias Elei, José Tchalo
Note: Landu / Carlitos, Eddie, Kuagica, Natael / Dário, Jaime, Sidnei (c), Ito (substituted off) 46' / Diawara (substituted off) 65', Erivaldo (substituted off) 70' — Kaya (substituted on) 46', Phellype (substituted on) 65', Celson (substituted on) 70'

Sat, 16 Jul 2016 17	Kabuscorp	0–1	Rec do Libolo	Coqueiros, Luanda
15:00 WAT (UTC+1)	Bobo (yellow card) 61'	Report	Dário 42'; Landu (yellow card) 90+4'	Attendance: 4.000; Referee: Hélder Martins; Jerson Emiliano, Wilson Tyamba
Note: Landu / Carlitos, Celson, Eddie, Natael / Ito, Jaime, Sidnei, Dário (substituted off) 80' / Nandinho (substituted off) 55', Phellype (substituted off) 90' — Erivaldo (substituted on) 55', Kaya (substituted on) 80', Boka (substituted on) 90'

Sat, 24 Jul 2016 18	Rec do Libolo	2–1	Interclube	Estádio Municipal, Calulo
15:00 WAT (UTC+1)	Abdul 44'; Etah (yellow card) 47'		Rico (yellow card) 20' (goal) 35'; Valdez (yellow card) 72'; Paz (yellow card) 77'; Moco 90'

Sun, 31 Jul 2016 19	ASA	1–0	Rec do Libolo	Coqueiros, Luanda
18:00 WAT (UTC+1)	Josemar (yellow card) 36'; Gerry (yellow card) 40'; Reginó (red card) 52'; Nelito 88'	Report	Erivaldo (yellow card) 45'	Referee: Maximina Bernardo; Cláudio Vunge, Cláudio Francisco
Note: Landu / Ito, Jaime, Kuagica, Eddie (substituted off) 55' / Dário, Kaya, Sidnei, Nandinho (substituted off) 60' / Erivaldo, Phellype — Natael (substituted on) 55', Cabibi I (substituted on) 60'

Sun, 7 Aug 2016 20	Rec do Libolo	1–1	Petro Atlético	Estádio Municipal, Calulo
15:00 WAT (UTC+1)	Kaya 65'		Francis 37'	Referee: António Caxala

Fri, 12 Aug 2016 21	Benfica Luanda	2–3	Rec do Libolo	11 de Novembro, Luanda
18:00 WAT (UTC+01:00)	Borges 22' (yellow card) 41'; Jacek (yellow card) 26'; Manuel (yellow card) 33'; Macaia 49'	Report	Erivaldo 30'; Phellype 61' 90+4'; Kuagica (yellow card) 65'; Ito (yellow card) 84'	Attendance: 2.000; Referee: João Ngoma; Luís Sá Miranda, Orlando Pimenta
Note: Landu / Celson, Eddie, Ito, Kuagica / Dário, Sidnei, Jaime (substituted off) 45', Nandinho (substituted off) 86' / Erivaldo, Phellype — Kaya (substituted on) 45', Cabibi I (substituted on) 86'

Sat, 20 Aug 2016 22	Rec do Libolo	0–0	1º de Agosto	Estádio Municipal, Calulo
15:00 WAT (UTC+1)	Erivaldo (yellow card) 33'; Jaime (yellow card) 37'; Sidnei (yellow card) 38'	Report	Jumisse (yellow card) 28'	Attendance: 5.000; Referee: Mauro de Oliveira; Luís Mateus, Domingos Francisco
Note: Landu / Celson, Eddie, Kuagica, Ito (substituted off) 77' / Dário, Jaime, Sidnei (c), Nandinho (substituted off) 76' / Erivaldo, Phellype (substituted off) 90+2' — Cabibi I (substituted on) 76', Wíres (substituted on) 77', Kaya (substituted on) 90+2'

Wed, 14 Sep 2016 23	4 de Abril	0–0	Rec do Libolo	Estádio Municipal, Menongue
15:00 WAT (UTC+1)	Pilola (yellow card) 67'			Referee: Conceição Matias; Celestino Golombole, Infante Pedro

Mon, 19 Sep 2016 24	Rec do Libolo	2–0	Académica Lobito	Estádio Municipal, Calulo
15:00 WAT (UTC+1)	Nandinho 13'; Kaya 46'; Dário (yellow card) 87'	Report	(yellow card) 43' Nani; (yellow card) 76' Jo; (yellow card) 90+2' Osório	Attendance: 3.500; Referee: Feliciano Lucas; Nicodemos Calembela, Alexandre Bengue
Note: Landu / Celson, Eddie, Kuagica, Natael / Nandinho, Sidnei, Dário (substituted off) 36', Kaya (substituted off) 80' / Erivaldo (substituted off) 65', Phellype — Ito (substituted on) 36', Wíres (substituted on) 65', Cabibi I (substituted on) 80'

Sat, 24 Sep 2016 25	Progresso LS	0–1	Rec do Libolo	Mangueiras, Saurimo
15:00 WAT (UTC+1)	Wilson (yellow card) 89'	Report	Kaya (yellow card) 29'; Erivaldo 38'; Natael (yellow card) 43'; Nandinho (yellow card) 56'; Phellype (yellow card) 84'; Landu (yellow card) 89'	Attendance: 5.000; Referee: Job da Silva; Adão da Silva, Odreia Miguel
Note: Landu / Celson, Eddie, Kuagica, Natael / Kaya, Nandinho, Sidnei (c), Ito (substituted off) 86', / Erivaldo, Phellype (substituted off) 85' — Jaime (substituted on) 85', Cabibi I (substituted on) 86'

Mon, 10 Oct 2016 26	Rec do Libolo	1–0	Rec da Caála	Estádio Municipal, Calulo
15:00 WAT (UTC+1)	Wíres (yellow card) 61'; Phellype 65' (pen.)		Gildo (yellow card) 49' (yellow-red card) 86'; Ossiki (yellow card) 63'; Adilson (yellow card) 69'	Referee: Hélder Calenga; Wilson Ntiamba, Pedro Nguelengue
Note: Landu / Celson, Eddie, Kuagica, Natael / Ito, Sidnei (c), Dário (substituted off) 58', Nandinho (substituted off) 83' / Erivaldo (substituted off) 90+2', Phellype — Wíres (substituted on) 58', Jaime (substituted on) 83', Cabibi I (substituted on) 90+2'

Sun, 16 Oct 2016 27	Progresso	1–0	Rec do Libolo	Cidadela, Luanda
15:00 WAT (UTC+1)	Yano 84'	Report	(yellow card) 59' Jaime	Attendance: 3.000; Referee: José Álvaro; Jerson Emiliano, António Livongue
Note: Landu / Celson, Eddie, Jaime, Natael / Nandinho, Sidnei (c), Kaya (substituted off) 66', Ito (substituted off) 74' / Erivaldo, Phellype (substituted off) 79' — Dário (substituted on) 66', Cabibi I (substituted on) 74', Boka (substituted on) 79'

Sun, 23 Oct 2016 28	Sagrada	1–2	Rec do Libolo	Sagrada Esperança, Dundo
15:30 WAT (UTC+1)	Love 90+3'		62' Erivaldo; 81' Phellype	Referee: Pedro dos Santos; Pedro Futa, Domingos Cordeiro
Note: Landu / Celson, Eddie, Jaime, Natael / Nandinho, Sidnei (c), Kaya, Ito / Erivaldo, Phellype

Sat, 29 Oct 2016 29	Rec do Libolo	4–2	Porcelana FC	Estádio Municipal, Calulo
15:30 WAT (UTC+1)	Nandinho 10'; Eddie 23'; Cabibi I 49'; Dário 74'	Report	32' Djamini; 82' Careca	Referee: Tânia Duarte; Luzia Luhaco, Adália Jeremias
Note: Nílton / Kuagica, Eddie (substituted off) 60', Jaime, Natael / Cabibi I, Dário (c), Kaya, Wíres (substituted off) 60' / Nandinho (substituted off) 65', Phellype — Boka (substituted on) 60', Ito (substituted on) 60', Luís (substituted on) 65'

Sat, 5 Nov 2016 30	Desportivo	2–1	Rec do Libolo	Estádio do Ferrovia, Lubango
15:30 WAT (UTC+1)	Maludi (yellow card) 38'; Bruno 62'; Avex 64'	Report	Wíres 39'; Kuagica (yellow card) 63'; Kaya (yellow card) 74'	Attendance: 2.000; Referee: João Ngoma; Luís Sá Miranda, Orlando Pimenta
Note: Ricardo (substituted off) 85' / Boka, Celson, Kuagica, Eddie / Cabibi I, Dário, Sidnei, Wíres (substituted off) 45' / Phellype, Erivaldo (substituted off) 76' — Kaya (substituted on) 45', Adilson (substituted on) 76', Manaia (substituted on) 85'

== CAF Champions League ==
=== Preliminary round ===
Sat, 13 Feb 2016	Rec do Libolo (Angola)	5–1	(Equatorial Guinea) Racing Micomeseng	Calulo
15:00	Phellype 18' 54' 63'; Fredy (yellow card) 25' (goal) 85'; Diawara 90'		Keleba 48'; Bekono (yellow card) 50'	Stadium: Estádio Municipal; Referee: Messie Mvoutou; Styven Moyo, Blaise Boutamba (Congo)
Note: Ricardo / Eddie, Kuagica, Natael, Edy Boyom (substituted off) 62' / Fredy, Sidnei, Wíres, Dário (c) (substituted off) 72' / Phellype, Brito (substituted off) 45' — Cabibi I (substituted on) 45', Diawara (substituted on) 62', Dany (substituted on) 72'

Sun, 28 Feb 2016	Racing Micomeseng (Equatorial Guinea)	0–4 (9–1 agg.)	(Angola) Rec do Libolo	Estadio de Bata, Bata
16:00			Diawara 49' 55' 70'; Erivaldo 50'	Referee: Raul Santos; Edgar Semedo, Wilson Cheque (São Tomé and Príncipe)

=== 1/16th Final ===
Sat, 12 Mar 2016	Rec do Libolo (Angola)	0–0	(Egypt) Al Ahly SC	Calulo
15:00	Wíres (yellow card) 24'	Report	Rabia (yellow card) 84'	Stadium: Estádio Municipal; Referee: Davies Omweno; Marwa Range, Peter Sabatia (Kenya)
Note: Ricardo / Edy Boyom, Eddie, Ito, Kuagica (substituted off) 70' / Dário, Fredy, Wíres, Dany (substituted off) 80' / Phellype, Erivaldo (substituted off) 75' — Jaime (substituted on) 70', Brito (substituted on) 75', Diawara (substituted on) 80'

Sat, 19 Mar 2016	Al Ahly SC (Egypt)	2–0 (0–2 agg.)	(Angola) Rec do Libolo	Borg El Arab, Alexandria
18:00	Ahmed 10'; Antwi 83'; Zakaria (yellow card) 90+1'			Referee: Malang Diedhiou; Djibril Camara, El Hadji Samba (Senegal)
Note: Ricardo / Edy Boyom (substituted off) 65', Eddie, Ito, Kuagica / Dany (substituted off) 46', Dário (c), Erivaldo (substituted off) 56', Fredy, Wíres / Diawara — Phellype (substituted on) 46', Brito (substituted on) 56', Cabibi I (substituted on) 65'

== Angola Cup ==
=== Round of 16 ===
Sat, 2 July 2016	ASA	0–1	Rec do Libolo	Luanda
16:00			Eddie 63'	Stadium: 22 de Junho; Referee: Pedro dos Santos; Luís Mateus, Domingos Francisco
Note: Ricardo / Carlitos, Jaime, Kuagica, Natael (substituted off) 85' / Dário (substituted off) 90+1', Eddie, Ito, Sidnei / Diawara (substituted off) 67', Erivaldo — Phellype (substituted on) 67', Nandinho (substituted on) 85', Celson (substituted on) 90+1'

=== Quarter-finals ===
Tue, 6 Sep 2016	Interclube	1–2	Rec do Libolo	Luanda
15:00	Chico 22'; Christ (yellow card) 39'; Tó Carneiro (yellow card) 85'	Report	Phellype 69'; Kaya 81'; Dário (yellow card) 85'; Jaime (yellow card)	Stadium: 22 de Junho; Attendance: 2.000; Referee: Pedro dos Santos; Pedro Futa, Domingos Cordeiro
Note: Ricardo / Eddie, Jaime, Kuagica, Celson (substituted off) 45' / Dário, Nandinho, Sidnei, Ito (substituted off) 68' / Phellype, Erivaldo (substituted off) 74' — Natael (substituted on) 45', Cabibi I (substituted on) 68', Kaya (substituted on) 74'

=== Semi-finals ===
Sun, 2 Oct 2016	Rec do Libolo	2–1	Petro Atlético	Calulo
15:00	Erivaldo 54'; Phellype 56'; Natael (yellow card) 64'; Manaia (yellow card) 90+3'	Report	7' (yellow card) 70' Job; (red card) 51' Abdul	Stadium: Estádio Municipal; Attendance: 5.000; Referee: Romualdo Baltazar; Jerson Emiliano, Rosário Calembela
Note: Landu / Eddie, Celson, Kuagica, Natael / Erivaldo (substituted off) 69', Ito, Kaya, Nandinho (substituted off) 79', Sidnei (c) / Phellype (substituted off) 90+1' — Cabibi I (substituted on) 69', Wíres (substituted on) 79', Jaime (substituted on) 90+1'

=== Final ===
Fri, 11 November 2016
16:00

Recreativo do Libolo	2–1 (a.e.t.)	Progresso do Sambizanga
Erivaldo 23'; Ito 90+10'	Report	84' Vá

Estádio 11 de Novembro, Luanda
Attendance: 10.000
Referee: Hélder Martins

Libolo	Progresso

GK	1	(Angola) Ricardo	(yellow card) 90+29'
RB	18	(Angola) Eddie		(substituted off) 49'
CB	6	(Angola) Celson
CB	25	(Angola) Kuagica
LB	2	(Angola) Natael
RM	11	(Angola) Nandinho		(substituted off) 66'
CM	8	(Cape Verde) Sidnei (c)	(yellow card) 90+30'
CM	14	(Angola) Ito	(yellow card) 37'
LM	20	(Angola) Dário
FW	9	(Brazil) Luiz Phellype
FW	19	(Angola) Erivaldo		(substituted off) 90+19'
Substitutions:
DF	21	(Angola) Jaime		(substituted on) 49'
MF	23	(Republic of the Congo) Kaya		(substituted on) 66'
DF	16	(Angola) Boka		(substituted on) 90+19'
Manager:
(Portugal) João Paulo Costa

GK	16	(Cameroon) Nyamé
RB	13	(Angola) Lunguinha	(yellow card) 10'
CB	2	(Angola) Ndieu	(yellow card) 73'
CB	3	(Angola) Nzau
LB	20	(Cameroon) Jonathan
RM	11	(Angola) Silva	(yellow card) 58'	(substituted off) 90+7'
CM	5	(Cameroon) Gérard	(yellow card) 90+9'
CM	8	(Angola) Almeida		(substituted off) 56'
CM	14	(Angola) Celso		(substituted off) 78'
LM	23	(Angola) Viet	(yellow card) 90+14'
FW	-	(Angola) Yano (c)
Substitutions:
FW	10	(Angola) Luís		(substituted on) 56'
FW	17	(Angola) Vá	(yellow card) 79'	(substituted on) 78'
–	6	(Angola) Megue		(substituted on) 90+7'
Manager:
(Angola) Albano César

Assistant referees:
Júlio Lemos
Joaquim da Rocha

== Season statistics ==
=== Total results ===
Overall								Home						Away					
Pld	W	D	L	GF	GA	GD	Pts	W	D	L	GF	GA	GD	W	D	L	GF	GA	GD
39	19	11	9	57	37	+20	68	12	7	0	35	13	+22	7	4	9	22	24	−2

Last updated: 5 Nov 2016.

=== Appearances and goals ===
As of 11 November 2016

Appearances denote players in the starting lineup, with the numbers in parentheses denoting appearances as substitute.

No.	Name	League		Cup		Supercup		CAF		Total	
No.	Name	Apps	Goals	Apps	Goals	Apps	Goals	Apps	Goals	Apps	Goals
Goalkeepers
1	(Angola) Ricardo	10	0	2	0	1	0	3	0	16	0
12	(Angola) Manaia	0 (1)	0	0	0	0	0	0	0	0 (1)	0
22	(Angola) Lando	12	0	1	0	0	0	0	0	13	0
29	(Angola) Nílton	1	0	0	0	0	0	0	0	1	0
Defenders
2	(Angola) Natael	15	0	2 (1)	0	1	0	1	0	19 (1)	0
4	(Cameroon) Edy Boyom	11	2	0	0	1	0	3	0	15	2
6	(Angola) Celson	11	0	3	0	0	0	0	0	14	0
16	(Angola) Boka	1 (1)	0	0 (1)	0	0	0	0	0	1 (2)	0
18	(Angola) Eddie	20	1	3	1	1	0	3	0	27	2
21	(Angola) Jaime	10	1	1 (2)	0	0	0	0 (1)	0	11 (3)	1
25	(Angola) Kuagica	18	1	3	0	1	1	3	0	25	2
26	(Angola) Pataca	1	0	0	0	0	0	0	0	1	0
27	(Angola) Carlitos	7	0	0	0	0	0	0	0	7	0
Midfielders
3	(Brazil) Wíres	11	2	0 (1)	0	0	0	3	0	14 (1)	2
7	(Cape Verde) Brito	4	4	0	0	1	1	1 (2)	0	6 (2)	5
8	(Cape Verde) Sidnei	20	2	3	0	1	1	1	0	25	3
10	(Angola) Dany	2	3	0	0	1	0	2 (1)	0	5 (1)	3
11	(Angola) Nandinho	10	2	3	0	0	0	0	0	13	2
14	(Angola) Ito	10 (1)	0	3	1	0	0	2	0	15 (1)	1
16	(Angola) Fredy	10	3	0	0	1	1	3	1	14	5
17	(Angola) Cabibi I	2	2	0 (2)	0	0 (1)	0	0 (2)	0	2 (5)	2
20	(Angola) Dário	20	7	2	0	0	0	3	0	25	7
23	(Republic of the Congo) Kaya	7 (1)	2	1 (2)	1	0	0	0	0	8 (3)	3
30	(Angola) Adilson	0 (1)	0	0	0	0	0	0	0	0 (1)	0
30	(Angola) Luís Cardoso	0 (1)	0	0	0	0	0	0	0	0 (1)	0
Forwards
9	(Brazil) Luiz Phellype	17	7	3	2	1	1	2 (1)	3	23 (1)	13
19	(Angola) Erivaldo	15	6	3	2	0 (1)	1	2	1	20 (1)	10
24	(Angola) Diawara	8	4	0	0	0 (1)	0	1 (2)	4	9 (3)	8
Opponents
–	Own goal	0	0	0	0	0	0	0	0	0	0
Total
	253	49	33	7		6		9			71

=== Top scorers ===
As of 11 November 2016

Rank	Name	League		Cup		Champ		S.C.	Total
Rank	Name	Aps	Gls	Aps	Gls	Aps	Gls	Gls	Gls
1	(Brazil) Luiz Phellype		7		2		3	1	13
2	(Angola) Erivaldo		6		2		1	1	10
3	(France) Diawara		4				4		8
4	(Angola) Dário		7						7
5	(Angola) Fredy		3				1	1	5
5	(Cape Verde) Brito		4					1	5
7	(Angola) Dany		3						3

== See also ==
- List of C.R.D. Libolo players
