= 2015 Angola Super Cup =

Supertaça de Angola 2015
Rec do Libolo	Benfica Luanda
Girabola	Taça Angola
4	2
- Date: February 18, 2015
- Venue: Estádio dos Coqueiros, Luanda
- Referee: Rodrigues Aleixo
- Attendance: 4.000

The 2015 Supertaça de Angola (28th edition) was contested by Recreativo do Libolo, the 2014 Girabola champion and Benfica de Luanda, the 2014 cup winner. Recreativo do Libolo was the winner, making it its 1st title.

== Match details ==
18 February 2015
16:00

Recreativo do Libolo	0–0 (a.e.t.)	Benfica de Luanda
	Report
Penalties
M.Sanda (penalty missed); Rudy (penalty scored); Chico (penalty scored); Fredy (penalty scored); Wíres (penalty scored)	4–2	(penalty scored) Adawa; (penalty scored) Miguel; (penalty missed) Amaro; (penalty missed) Gomito

Estádio dos Coqueiros, Luanda
Attendance: 4,000
Referee: Rodrigues Aleixo

Libolo	Benfica

GK	22	(Angola) Landu
RB	3	(Brazil) Wíres	(yellow card) 89'
CB	6	(Angola) Mingo Sanda	(yellow card) 32'
CB	25	(Angola) Kuagica	(yellow card) 23' (yellow-red card) 73'
LB	2	(Angola) Natael
RM	21	(Angola) Fuky
CM	8	(Cape Verde) Sidnei (c)
CM	16	(Angola) Fredy
LM	20	(Angola) Dário		(substituted off) 80'
CF	23	(Republic of the Congo) Kaya		(substituted off) 62'
CF	24	(France) Diawara		(substituted off) 90+27'
Substitutions:
MF	13	(Angola) Rudy		(substituted in) 62'
DF	5	(Portugal) Mauro		(substituted in) 80'
FW	11	(Angola) Chico		(substituted in) 90+27'
Manager:
(France) Sébastien Desabre

GK	12	(Cape Verde) Élber
RB	13	(Angola) Gomito	(yellow card) 89'
CB	5	(Brazil) Jeferson
CB	23	(Angola) Dedé
LB	4	(Angola) Debele	(yellow card) 77' (yellow-red card) 90+7'
RM	11	(Angola) Amaro	(yellow card) 23'
CM	10	(Ivory Coast) Savané
CM	18	(Angola) Rúben		(substituted off) 78'
LM	20	(Angola) Gilberto (c)		(substituted off) 90'
CF	9	(Brazil) Fabrício
CF	25	(Angola) Pedro		(substituted off) 90+21'
Substitutions:
MF	2	(Angola) Adawa		(substituted in) 78'
MF	8	(Angola) Hélio	(yellow card) 90+30'	(substituted in) 90'
DF	29	(Angola) Miguel		(substituted in) 90+21'
Manager:
(Angola) Zeca Amaral

Assistant referees:
Jerson Emiliano
Wilson Ntyamba
Fourth official:
Maximina Bernardo

2015 Angola Football Super Cup winner
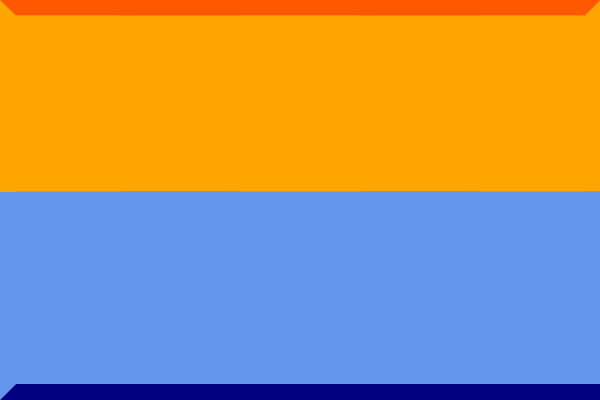
Clube Recreativo Desportivo do Libolo
1st title

Full squad:
Landu, Mig, Nílton, Ricardo (GK)
Carlitos, Eddie, Edy Boyom, Kuagica, Mauro, Mingo Sanda, Natael, Wires (DF)
Dany, Dário, Fredy, Fuky, Kaya, Mbongo, Medá, Rudy, Sidnei, Pataca (MF)
Alexandre, Brito, Chico, Evandro, Diawara, Valdinho (FW)
Sébastien Desabre (Head Coach)

== See also ==
- 2014 Angola Cup
- 2014 Girabola
- Recreativo do Libolo players
- Benfica de Luanda players
