= 2015 Girabola =

Girabola
- Season: 2015
- Champions: Recreativo do Libolo
- Relegated: Domant; Bravos do Maquis; Sporting de Cabinda
- Champions League: Recreativo do Libolo
- Matches played: 240
- Goals scored: 514 (2.14 per match)
- Top goalscorer: Albert Meyong; Yano (13)
- Biggest home win: 1º de Agosto 5-0 ASA (10 May 2015)
- Biggest away win: 5 matches: Progresso 0-3 ASA (4 March 2015); Progresso 0-3 1º de Agosto (4 April 2015); Sporting de Cabinda 1-4 Progresso (16 May 2015); Domant 0-3 Recreativo do Libolo (2 August 2015); Benfica Luanda 1-4 1º de Agosto (4 October 2015)
- Highest scoring: Interclube 5-2 Sp Cabinda (21 Feb 2015)
- Longest winning run: Recreativo do Libolo (7)
- Longest unbeaten run: Recreativo do Libolo (22)
- Longest winless run: Recreativo da Caála (11)
- Longest losing run: Domant (6)
- All statistics correct as of 10 October 2015.

The 2015 Girabola was the 37th season of top-tier football in Angola. The season ran from 11 February to 10 October 2015. Recreativo do Libolo survived a late-season scare from 1º de Agosto to win their fourth Angolan championship, all in the past five years. Recreativo do Libolo needed a scoreless draw against Académica do Lobito in their final game to finish in a tie atop the standings with 1º de Agosto, who closed the season with six straight wins. Recreativo do Libolo won the tiebreaker based on head-to-head points.

The league comprised 16 of teams and the bottom three were relegated to the 2016 Segundona. Domant, Onze Bravos and Sporting de Cabinda finished in the last three spots and were relegated.

== Teams ==
A total of 16 teams contested the league, including 13 sides from the 2014 season and three promoted from the 2014 Segundona, Académica do Lobito, Domant and Progresso Lunda Sul.

Recreativo do Libolo were the defending champions from the 2014 season.

== Changes from 2014 season ==
Relegated: Primeiro de Maio, Benfica do Lubango, União do Uíge
Promoted: Académica do Lobito, Domant FC, Progresso da Lunda Sul

=== Stadiums and locations ===
Locations of the 2014 Girabola teams

Team	Home city	Stadium	Capacity	2013 season
Académica do Lobito	Lobito	Estádio do Buraco	15,000	1st in Segundona
ASA	Luanda	Estádio dos Coqueiros	8,000	13th in Girabola
Benfica de Luanda	Luanda	Estádio 11 de Novembro	50,000	3rd in Girabola
Bravos do Maquis	Luena	Estádio Mundunduleno	4,300	6th in Girabola
Desportivo da Huíla	Lubango	Estadio da Tundavala	25,000	11th in Girabola
Domant	Caxito	Estádio Municipal do Dande	5,000	3rd in Segundona
Interclube	Luanda	Estádio 22 de Junho	7,000	9th in Girabola
Kabuscorp	Luanda	Estádio dos Coqueiros	8,000	2nd in Girabola
Petro de Luanda	Luanda	Estádio 11 de Novembro	50,000	5th in Girabola
Primeiro de Agosto	Luanda	Estádio 11 de Novembro	50,000	4th in Girabola
Progresso da Lunda Sul	Saurimo	Estádio das Mangueiras	7,000	2nd in Segundona
Progresso do Sambizanga	Luanda	Estádio da Cidadela	30,000	10th in Girabola
Recreativo da Caála	Caála	Estádio Mártires da Canhala	12,000	7th in Girabola
Recreativo do Libolo	Calulo	Estádio Municipal	10,000	Girabola Champions
Sagrada Esperança	Dundo	Estádio Sagrada Esperança	8,000	8th in Girabola
Sporting de Cabinda	Cabinda	Estádio Municipal do Tafe	25,000	12th in Girabola

== League table ==
Pos	Team	Pld	W	D	L	GF	GA	GD	Pts	Qualification or relegation
1	Recreativo do Libolo (C)	30	16	12	2	44	20	+24	60 (Note: Head-to-head results: 1º de Agosto 1 Rec do Libolo 1; Rec do Libolo 3 1º de Agosto 2.)	Qualification for Champions League
2	Primeiro de Agosto	30	17	9	4	51	23	+28	60	
3	Benfica de Luanda	30	14	11	5	35	23	+12	53	
4	Kabuscorp	30	11	15	4	32	23	+9	48	
5	Interclube	30	11	12	7	34	24	+10	45	
6	Progresso da LS	30	10	10	10	31	31	0	40	
7	Desportivo da Huíla	30	10	9	11	24	33	−9	39	
8	Petro de Luanda	30	10	8	12	25	29	−4	38	
9	ASA	30	10	8	12	31	39	−8	38	
10	Sagrada Esperança	30	9	10	11	22	28	−6	37	
11	Recreativo da Caála	30	7	15	8	28	25	+3	36	
12	Progresso do Sambizanga	30	9	8	13	35	38	−3	35	
13	Académica do Lobito	30	9	6	15	34	36	−2	33	
14	Bravos do Maquis (R)	30	8	7	15	28	40	−12	31	Relegation to Provincial stages
15	Sporting de Cabinda (R)	30	7	10	13	31	46	−15	31	Relegation to Provincial stages
16	Domant FC (R)	30	5	4	21	28	55	−27	19	Relegation to Provincial stages

Updated to match(es) played on 10 October 2015. Source: Girabola.com
Rules for classification: 1) Points; 2) Head-to-head points; 3) Head-to-head goal difference; 4) Goal difference; 5) Goals scored; 6) Fair-play points; 7) Play-off.
(C) Champions; (R) Relegated

== Results ==
Home \ Away	ACA	ASA	BEN	BMQ	DHL	DOM	INT	KAB	PET	PRI	PRL	PRO	RCA	RLB	SAG	SCC
Académica do Lobito	—	2–0	1–2	1–1	3–1	1–1	1–1	1–3	1–0	2–0	1–2	0–1	1–0	0–0	1–0	3–0
ASA	3–1	—	1–1	1–0	4–1	2–3	1–3	0–0	0–1	1–2	2–3	1–0	1–1	0–0	1–1	2–0
Benfica de Luanda	2–0	2–0	—	2–1	1–0	2–0	1–0	1–1	1–1	1–4	2–2	2–1	1–0	0–1	3–0	3–2
Bravos do Maquis	1–0	1–2	0–0	—	2–1	3–1	0–1	1–1	1–2	3–2	1–0	2–1	2–1	2–1	1–1	2–2
Desportivo da Huíla	1–0	1–0	2–1	1–0	—	1–0	1–0	0–0	1–0	0–0	2–0	0–0	1–1	0–1	0–2	1–0
Domant FC	2–1	1–2	0–1	3–0	0–1	—	2–3	1–3	0–1	2–3	2–1	1–2	1–1	0–3	1–1	2–1
Interclube	3–2	0–0	1–1	3–0	0–0	1–1	—	1–1	1–0	0–2	0–1	2–2	1–0	1–1	3–0	5–2
Kabuscorp	2–1	0–1	0–1	1–0	1–1	3–1	1–0	—	1–0	1–1	0–0	1–1	2–2	1–2	2–2	1–2
Petro de Luanda	1–3	0–1	2–1	2–1	1–1	2–0	0–0	1–2	—	1–2	1–1	2–1	2–1	1–1	1–0	1–0
Primeiro de Agosto	1–1	5–0	1–1	2–0	4–1	2–0	2–0	0–1	1–1	—	2–1	2–0	2–1	1–1	2–0	0–0
Progresso da Lunda Sul	0–1	1–0	1–1	1–0	2–2	2–0	1–1	0–0	1–0	0–0	—	2–1	2–2	0–1	1–0	3–0
Progresso do Sambizanga	3–2	0–3	0–0	1–1	2–1	2–0	0–0	0–1	1–0	0–3	4–1	—	0–1	1–2	1–1	4–2
Recreativo da Caála	2–1		1–0	3–1	0–0	1–0	0–1	0–0	0–0	0–1	0–0	0–0	—	0–0	2–0	1–1
Recreativo do Libolo	1–0	4–0	0–0	1–0	5–1	4–2	0–0	2–2	1–1	3–2	2–1	2–1	1–1	—	2–0	1–2
Sagrada Esperança	2–1	0–0	0–1	1–0	1–0	3–0	0–2	0–1	2–0	0–0	1–0	2–1	0–0	0–0	—	2–1
Sporting de Cabinda	1–1	1–1	0–0	1–1	2–1	2–1	1–0	0–0	2–0	1–2	2–1	1–4	2–2	0–1	0–0	—

Updated to match(es) played on 10 October 2015. Source: girabola.com
Legend: Blue = home team win; Yellow = draw; Red = away team win.

=== Positions by round ===
Team \ Round	1	2	3	4	5	6	7	8	9	10	11	12	13	14	15	16	17	18	19	20	21	22	23	24	25	26	27	28	29	30
Recreativo do Libolo	7	11	3	2	2	1	1	2	3	1	1	1	1	1	1	1	1	1	1	1	1	1	1	1	1	1	1	1	1	1
1º de Agosto	7	14	15	16	15	14	10	7	6	6	4	3	4	4	4	4	4	6	5	5	5	4	4	4	3	2	2	2	2	2
Benfica de Luanda	11	4	6	4	4	5	6	5	5	3	2	4	2	2	3	2	2	2	2	2	2	2	2	2	2	3	3	3	3	3
Kabuscorp	7	11	3	3	3	3	3	4	2	4	3	2	3	3	2	3	3	3	4	4	3	3	3	3	4	4	4	4	4	4
Interclube	2	1	1	1	1	2	2	1	1	2	5	6	6	5	5	5	5	4	3	3	4	6	5	5	5	5	5	5	5	5
Progresso Lunda Sul	11	10	14	7	8	7	5	3	4	5	6	5	5	6	6	6	7	5	6	6	6	5	6	6	6	6	6	6	6	6
Desportivo da Huíla	4	3	8	11	12	13	15	12	13	14	14	14	14	12	11	13	14	14	11	12	12	11	8	8	10	8	7	7	9	7
Petro de Luanda	14	5	9	5	5	4	4	6	7	7	9	10	7	9	8	7	6	7	7	7	7	7	7	7	7	10	9	8	7	8
ASA	1	2	5	9	9	6	8	10	10	13	11	11	12	14	14	11	12	9	8	8	8	8	9	10	11	12	13	13	10	9
Sagrada Esperança	14	14	11	13	13	16	11	13	14	12	10	8	9	7	9	10	9	10	13	13	13	14	15	14	13	13	12	11	11	10
Recreativo da Caála	7	11	13	10	11	11	14	15	15	15	15	15	15	15	16	15	15	15	12	9	10	10	11	9	9	7	10	10	8	11
Progresso	16	16	16	15	16	15	16	16	11	10	13	12	9	7	7	8	8	8	9	10	9	9	10	11	8	9	11	9	12	12
Académica do Lobito	11	9	12	8	10	10	13	9	9	9	12	13	13	11	12	12	13	13	15	15	15	13	13	12	12	11	8	12	13	13
Bravos do Maquis	4	6	2	6	7	8	7	8	8	8	7	7	8	10	10	9	10	11	14	14	14	15	14	15	15	15	15	15	14	14
Sporting de Cabinda	2	8	7	13	14	12	9	11	12	11	8	9	11	13	13	14	11	12	10	11	11	12	12	13	14	14	14	14	15	15
Domant	4	7	9	12	6	9	12	14	16	16	16	16	16	16	15	16	16	16	16	16	16	16	16	16	16	16	16	16	16	16

Source: Girabola

Leader (2016 CAF Champions League)
Relegation to 2016 Provincial stages

== Season statistics ==
=== Top scorers ===
Rank	Scorer	Club	Goals
1	(Cameroon) Albert Meyong	Kabuscorp	13
1	(Angola) Yano	Progresso	13
3	(Angola) Moco	Interclube	12
3	(Angola) Ary Papel	1º de Agosto	12
5	(Angola) Pedro	Benfica Luanda	11
6	(Angola) Chole	Bravos do Maquis	10
6	(Angola) Fredy	Recreativo do Libolo	10
6	(Angola) Mateus Galiano	1º de Agosto	10
6	(Angola) Gelson	1º de Agosto	10
6	(Poland) Jacek Magdziński	Académica do Lobito	10
6	(Angola) Paizinho	Recreativo da Caála	10

=== Hat-tricks ===
Player	For	Against	Result	Date
Yano	Progresso Sambizanga	Progresso da Lunda Sul	4-1	18 July 2015
Patrick	Kabuscorp	Domant FC	3-1	22 April 2015

2015 Girabola winner
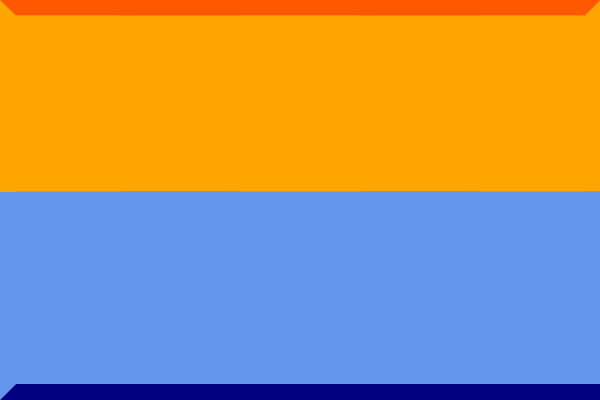
Clube Recreativo Desportivo do Libolo
4th title

Squad:
Landu, Manaia, Nílton, Ricardo (GK)
Carlitos, Eddie, Edy Boyom, Kuagica, Mauro, Mingo Sanda, Natael, Wires (DF)
Dany, Dário, Fredy, Fuky, Kaya, Mbongo, Medá, Rudy, Sidnei, Pataca (MF)
Alexandre, Brito, Chico, Diawara, Valdinho (FW)
João Paulo Costa (Head Coach)

Top Scorer
(Cameroon) Albert Meyong

== See also ==
- 2015 Segundona
