= 2016 Angola Super Cup =

Supertaça de Angola 2016
| Rec do Libolo | Bravos Maquis |
| Girabola | Taça Angola |
| 6 | 0 |
- Date: February 7, 2016
- Venue: Estádio dos Coqueiros, Luanda
- Referee: Benjamin Andrade
- Attendance: 2,700

The 2016 Supertaça de Angola (29th edition) was contested by Recreativo do Libolo, the 2015 Girabola champion and Bravos do Maquis, the 2015 cup winner. Recreativo do Libolo was the winner, making it is's 2nd title in a row.

== Match details ==
7 February 2016
16:00

| Recreativo Libolo | 6–0 | Bravos do Maquis |
|---|---|---|
| Fredy 20'; Sidnei 28'; Kuagica 58'; Brito 63'; Phellype 82'; Erivaldo 89' | Report |

Estádio dos Coqueiros, Luanda
Attendance: 2,700
Referee: Benjamin Andrade

| Libolo | Maquis |

| GK | 1 | (Portugal) Ricardo |
| RB | 18 | (Angola) Eddie |
| CB | 4 | (Cameroon) Edy Boyom |
| CB | 25 | (Angola) Kuagica | (yellow card) 45' |
| LB | 2 | (Angola) Natael |
| RM | 8 | (Cape Verde) Sidnei (c) |
| CM | ? | (Angola) Yuri |
| CM | 16 | (Angola) Fredy | | (substituted off) 67' |
| LM | 7 | (Cape Verde) Brito | | (substituted off) 60' |
| CF | 9 | (Brazil) Luiz Phellype |
| CF | 10 | (Angola) Danny | | (substituted off) 64' |
Substitutions:
| MF | 19 | (Angola) Erivaldo | | (substituted in) 60' |
| FW | 24 | (France) Diawara | | (substituted in) 64' |
| FW | 17 | (Angola) Cabibi I | | (substituted in) 67' |
Manager:
(Portugal) João Paulo Costa

| GK | 1 | (Angola) Lami |
| RB | – | (Angola) Victor |
| CB | – | (Angola) Yuri |
| CB | 24 | (Angola) Ikuma |
| LB | – | (Angola) Bobista |
| RM | – | (Cape Verde) Valter |
| CM | 13 | (Argentina) Ávalos (c) |
| CM | – | (Democratic Republic of the Congo) Tshukuma | (yellow card) 55' | (substituted off) 70' |
| LM | – | (Angola) Ndó |
| CF | – | (Angola) Vado |
| CF | – | (Angola) Choi | | (substituted off) 61' |
Substitutions:
| FW | 11 | (Angola) Joelson | | (substituted in) 61' |
| FW | 15 | (Angola) Higino | | (substituted in) 70' |
Manager:
(Angola) Mariano Júlio

Assistant referees:
Abel Ngulo
Judith Mestre
Fourth official:
Mauro de Oliveira

2016 Angola Football Super Cup winner

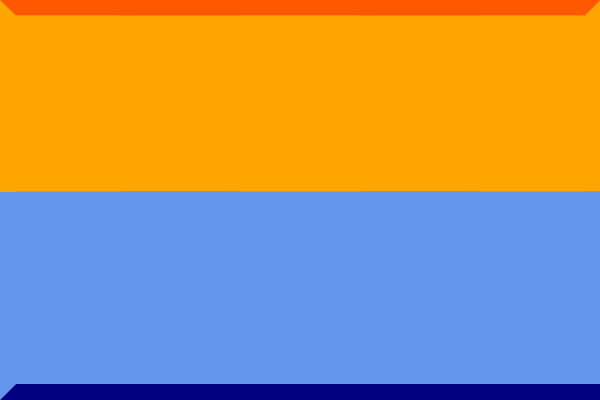
Clube Recreativo Desportivo do Libolo
2nd title

Squad: Adilson, Boka, Brito, Cabibi I, Carlitos, Celson, Dany, Dário, Diawara, Eddie,
Edy Boyom, Erivaldo, Fredy, Ito, Jaime, Kuagica, Lando, Luiz Phellype, Manaia, Natael, Nílton, Pataca, Ricardo, Sidnei, Wires
Head coach: João Paulo Costa

== See also ==
- 2015 Angola Cup
- 2016 Girabola
- 2016 Recreativo do Libolo season
- Bravos do Maquis players
