= 2016 Angola Cup =

Tournament details
- Country: Angola
- Dates: 18 Jun – 11 Nov 2016
- Teams: 22

Final positions
- Champions: Recreativo do Libolo
- Runners-up: Progresso do Sambizanga
- Confederation Cup: Rec do Libolo (winner)

Tournament statistics
- Matches played: 20

The 2016 Taça de Angola was the 35th edition of the Taça de Angola, the second most important and the top knock-out football club competition following the Girabola.

The winner qualified to the 2017 CAF Confederation Cup.

== Stadia and locations ==
Locations of the 2016 Angola Cup teams

P	Team	Home city	Stadium	Capacity	2015	Current	P
6	4 de Abril	Menongue	Campo Municipal	5,000	R16	PR	▼1
4	Académica do Lobito	Lobito	Estádio do Buraco	3,000	PR	QF	▲2
5	ASA	Luanda	Estádio da Cidadela	60,000	PR	R16	▲1
5	Benfica de Luanda	Luanda	Estádio dos Coqueiros	8,000	R16	R16	Steady
4	Bravos do Maquis	Luena	Estádio Mundunduleno	4,300	Champion	QF	▼3
5	Casa Militar (Note: Later changed their name to Cuando Cubango FC)	Menongue	Campo Municipal	5,000	DNP	R16	n/a
3	Domant FC	Caxito	Estádio Municipal do Dande	5,000	QF	SF	▲1
4	Interclube	Luanda	Estádio 22 de Junho	7,000	SF	QF	▼1
5	J.G.M.	Huambo	Estádio dos Kurikutelas	7,000	DNP	R16	n/a
5	Jackson Garcia	Benguela	Estádio de S. Filipe	5,000	DNP	R16	n/a
5	Kabuscorp	Luanda	Estádio dos Coqueiros	8,000	QF	R16	▼1
3	Petro de Luanda	Luanda	Estádio 11 de Novembro	50,000	SF	SF	Steady
6	Polivalente do Kwanza Sul	Sumbe	Estádio Hoji Ya Henda	3,000	PR	PR	Steady
6	Primeiro de Agosto	Luanda	Estádio 11 de Novembro	50,000	R16	PR	▼1
6	Primeiro de Maio	Benguela	Estádio Edelfride Costa	6,000	PR	PR	Steady
2	Progresso do Sambizanga	Luanda	Estádio dos Coqueiros	8,000	QF	Runner-Up	▲2
5	Progresso da Lunda Sul	Saurimo	Estádio das Mangueiras	7,000	PR	R16	▲1
6	Recreativo da Caála	Caála	Estádio Mártires da Canhala	12,000	R16	PR	▼1
1	Recreativo do Libolo	Calulo	Estádio Municipal de Calulo	10,000	QF	Champion	▲3
4	Sagrada Esperança	Dundo	Estádio Sagrada Esperança	8,000	Runner-Up	QF	▼2
6	Santa Rita de Cássia	Uíge	Estádio 4 de Janeiro	12,000	DNP	PR	n/a
6	Sporting de Cabinda	Cabinda	Estádio Nacional do Chiazi	25,000	R16	PR	▼1

== Championship bracket ==
Preliminary Rounds; Sat, 18 Jun 2016
Interclube (bye)
Sun, Jun 19 2016
Benfica Luanda	2
1º de Agosto	0
Rec Libolo (bye)
Sat, Jun 18 2016 (pen)
ASA	6
1º de Maio	5
Sat, Jun 18 2016
Académica Lobito	1
4 de Abril	0
Kabuscorp (bye)
Petro Atlético (bye)
Walkover
J.G.M.	3
Sporting Cabinda	0
Progresso (bye)
Sat, Jun 18 2016
Casa Militar	1
Rec da Caála	0
Sagrada (bye)
Sat, Jun 18 2016
Progresso L.S.	2
Polivalente KS	1
Domant FC (bye)
Sat, Jun 18 2016 (pen)
Jackson Garcia	4
Santa Rita	3
Bravos Maquis (bye)

1/16 Finals; Sat, 2 Jul 2016
Sat, 2 July 2016 (pen)
Interclube	5
Benfica Luanda	3
Sat, 2 July 2016
Rec Libolo	1
ASA	0
Sat, 2 July 2016 (pen)
Académica Lobito	5
Kabuscorp	3
Wed, 27 July 2016 (pen)
Petro Atlético	4
J.G.M.	3
Sat, 2 July 2016 (pen)
Progresso Sambizanga	2
Casa Militar	1
Sat, 2 July 2016 (pen)
Sagrada Esperança	4
Progresso L.S.	3
Sat, 2 July 2016 (pen)
Domant FC	4
Jackson Garcia	2
Bravos do Maquis

Quarterfinals; Tue/Wed, 6/7 Sep 2016
Tue, 6 Sep 2016
Interclube	1
Rec Libolo	2
Tue, 6 Sep 2016
Académica Lobito	0
Petro Atlético	3
Wed, 7 Sep 2016
Progresso Sambizanga	4
Sagrada Esperança	2
Wed, 7 Sep 2016
Domant FC	1
Bravos do Maquis	0

Semifinals; Wed, 5 Oct 2016
Wed, 5 Oct 2016
Rec Libolo	2
Petro Atlético	1
Wed, 5 Oct 2016 (pen)
Domant FC	3
Progresso	4

Final; Fri, 11 Nov 2016
Fri, 11 Nov 2016 a.e.t.
Rec Libolo	2
Progresso	1

== Preliminary rounds ==
Sat, 18 Jun 2016 PR	ASA	0–0 (a.e.t.) (6–5 p)	1º de Maio	Luanda
15:00				Stadium: Estádio da Cidadela

Sat, 18 Jun 2016 PR	Casa Militar	1–0	Rec da Caála	Menongue
15:00	Délcio 81'		Sassoma (yellow card); Vovó (yellow card); Maninho (yellow card) (yellow-red card) 39'	Stadium: Municipal de Menongue; Attendance: 2.000; Referee: Bernardo Nangolo; Pedro Nguelengue, António Pitra

Sat, 18 Jun 2016 PR	Académica	1–0	4 de Abril	Lobito
15:00				Stadium: Estádio do Buraco

Sat, 18 Jun 2016 PR	Jackson Garcia	1–1 (a.e.t.) (4–3 p)	Santa Rita	Benguela
15:30				Stadium: São Filipe
	Penalties
	Inho (penalty scored); Igor (penalty scored); Lucas (penalty scored); Oliveira (penalty scored)		(penalty scored) Dias; (penalty scored) Pedro; (penalty scored) Toti

Sat, 18 Jun 2016 PR	Polivalente KS	0–1	Progresso L.S.	Sumbe
15:30		Report	Agoya 13'; Ndié (yellow card) 35'; Mendinho (yellow card) 58'; Tshibuabua (yellow card) 62'; Vally (yellow card) 63'	Stadium: Hoji Ya Henda; Attendance: 1.500; Referee: Irene Pinto; Dário Gaspar, Nery da Silva

Sat, 18 Jun 2016 PR	J.G.M.	Walkover	Sporting	Huambo
16:00				Stadium: Kurikutelas

Sun, 19 Jun 2016 PR	1º de Agosto	0–2	Benfica	Luanda
15:00	Romaric (yellow card) 66'; Dani (yellow card) 90+3'	Report	Savané 14'; Gomito II 37'; Mariano (yellow card) 72'	Stadium: 11 de Novembro; Attendance: 2.000; Referee: Rodrigues Aleixo; Wilson Niyamba, Ricardo Daniel

== Round of 16 ==
Sat, 2 Jul 2016 R16	Académica	0–0 (a.e.t.) (5–3 p)	Kabuscorp	Lobito
15:00				Stadium: Estádio do Buraco

Sat, 2 Jul 2016 R16	Progresso L.S.	1–1 (a.e.t.) (3–4 p)	Sagrada	Saurimo
15:00	Bodunha 35'	Report	Chara 82'	Stadium: Estádio das Mangueiras; Referee: Paulo Talaya; Ricardo Daniel, Joaquim Chio
	Penalties
	Hervé (penalty missed); Lopes (penalty missed); Bodunha (penalty scored); Chileshe (penalty scored); René (penalty scored)		(penalty scored) Bugos; (penalty scored) Capuco; (penalty scored) Denis; (penalty scored) Love

Sat, 2 Jul 2016 R16	Benfica de Luanda	1–1 (a.e.t.) (3–5 p)	Interclube	Luanda
18:00	Amaro 39'	Report	Mvom 18'	Stadium: 11 de Novembro; Attendance: 200; Referee: António Cachala; Júlio Lemos, Julião Mateus
	Penalties
	(penalty missed) Bena

Sat, 2 Jul 2016 R16	Jackson Garcia	0–0 (a.e.t.) (2–4 p)	Domant FC	Benguela
16:00				Stadium: São Filipe
	Penalties
	(penalty scored) Bijú; (penalty scored) Igor		(penalty scored) Alex; (penalty scored) Bakig; (penalty scored) Béu; (penalty scored) Sigui

Sat, 2 Jul 2016 R16	Casa Militar	1–1 (a.e.t.) (1–2 p)	Progresso	Menongue
18:00	Liliano	Report	Gérard 34'	Stadium: Estádio Municipal; Attendance: 2.000; Referee: Feliciano Lucas; Nicodemos Calemba, Alexandre Mbungue

Sat, 2 Jul 2016 R16	ASA	0–1	Rec do Libolo	Luanda
16:00			Eddie 63'	Stadium: 22 de Junho; Referee: Pedro dos Santos

Wed, 27 Jul 2016 R16	J.G.M.	1–1 (a.e.t.) (3–4 p)	Petro Luanda	Huambo
16:00	Kilombo 28'	Report	Azulão 11'	Stadium: Kurikutelas; Attendance: 4.000; Referee: Pedro dos Anjos; Domingos Francisco, Félix António
	Penalties
	(penalty missed) Kilombo; (penalty missed) ? (penalty scored) Adilson; (penalty scored) Lobato; (penalty scored) Rafa		(penalty scored) Ary; (penalty scored) Etah; (penalty scored) Mira; (penalty scored) Azulão

== Quarter-finals ==
Tue, 6 Sep 2016 QF	Académica Lobito	0–3	Petro de Luanda	Lobito
15:00	Lourenço (yellow card)		Duarte (yellow card); Mateus (yellow card) (goal) 29'; Job 66'; Balacai 70'	Stadium: Estádio do Buraco; Referee: António Caxala; Wilson Ntyamba, Rosário Pedro

Tue, 6 Sep 2016 QF	Interclube	1–2	Rec do Libolo	Luanda
15:00	Chico 22'; Christ (yellow card) 39'; Tó Carneiro (yellow card) 85'	Report	Phellype 69'; Kaya 81'; Dário (yellow card) 85'	Stadium: 22 de Junho; Attendance: 2.000; Referee: Pedro dos Santos; Pedro Futa, Domingos Cordeiro

Wed, 7 Sep 2016 QF	Progresso	4–2	Sagrada	Luanda
15:00	Yano 2' 23' (pen.); Luís Tati (yellow card) 24'; Eliseu (yellow card) 31'; Celso 64'; Viet 80'	Report	Joka 13'; Lulas (yellow card) 21'; Fatite (red card) 25'; Patrick 56'	Stadium: Estádio da Cidadela; Referee: João Goma; Benjamim Andrade, Pedro Canombo

Wed, 7 Sep 2016 QF	Domant FC	1–0	Bravos do Maquis	Caxito
15:00	Patrick 73'			Stadium: Municipal do Dande; Referee: Maximina Bernardo; Cláudio Vunge, Cláudio Francisco

== Semi-finals ==
Sun, 2 Oct 2016 SF	Rec Libolo	2–1	Petro de Luanda	Calulo
15:00	Erivaldo 54'; Luiz Phellype 56'; Natael (yellow card) 64'; Manaia (yellow card) 90+3'	Report	7' (yellow card) 70' Job; (red card) 51' Abdul	Stadium: Estádio de Calulo; Attendance: 5.000; Referee: Romualdo Baltazar; Jerson Emiliano, Rosário Calembela

Wed, 5 Oct 2016 SF	Domant FC	0–0 (3–4 p)	Progresso	Caxito
15:00				Stadium: Municipal do Dande; Attendance: 2.000; Referee: Paulo Talaya; Ricardo Manuel, Joaquim Chiyo
	Penalties
	Bakig (penalty missed); Cabetula (penalty missed); Sigui (penalty scored); Neymar (penalty scored); Negra (penalty scored)		(penalty scored) Yano; (penalty scored) Lunguinha; (penalty missed) Viet; (penalty scored) Celso; (penalty scored) Gérard

== Final ==
Fri, 11 November 2016
16:00

Recreativo do Libolo	2–1 (a.e.t.)	Progresso do Sambizanga
Erivaldo 23'; Ito 90+10'	Report	84' Vá

Estádio 11 de Novembro, Luanda
Attendance: 10.000
Referee: Hélder Martins

Libolo	Progresso

GK	1	(Angola) Ricardo	(yellow card) 90+29'
RB	18	(Angola) Eddie		(substituted off) 49'
CB	6	(Angola) Celson
CB	25	(Angola) Kuagica
LB	2	(Angola) Natael
RM	11	(Angola) Nandinho		(substituted off) 66'
CM	8	(Cape Verde) Sidnei (c)	(yellow card) 90+30'
CM	14	(Angola) Ito	(yellow card) 37'
LM	20	(Angola) Dário
FW	9	(Brazil) Luiz Phellype
FW	19	(Angola) Erivaldo		(substituted off) 90+19'
Substitutions:
DF	21	(Angola) Jaime		(substituted on) 49'
MF	23	(Republic of the Congo) Kaya		(substituted on) 66'
DF	16	(Angola) Boka		(substituted on) 90+19'
Manager:
(Portugal) João Paulo Costa

GK	16	(Cameroon) Nyamé
RB	13	(Angola) Lunguinha	(yellow card) 10'
CB	2	(Angola) Ndieu	(yellow card) 73'
CB	3	(Angola) Nzau
LB	20	(Cameroon) Jonathan
RM	11	(Angola) Silva	(yellow card) 58'	(substituted off) 90+7'
CM	5	(Cameroon) Gérard	(yellow card) 90+9'
CM	8	(Angola) Almeida		(substituted off) 56'
CM	14	(Angola) Celso		(substituted off) 78'
LM	23	(Angola) Viet	(yellow card) 90+14'
FW	-	(Angola) Yano (c)
Substitutions:
FW	10	(Angola) Luís		(substituted on) 56'
FW	17	(Angola) Vá	(yellow card) 79'	(substituted on) 78'
–	6	(Angola) Megue		(substituted on) 90+7'
Manager:
(Angola) Albano César

Assistant referees:
Júlio Lemos
Joaquim da Rocha

2016 Angola Football Cup winner

1st title

Squad:
Landu, Manaia, Nílton, Ricardo (GK)
Boka, Carlitos, Celson, Eddie, Jaime, Kuagica, Natael, Wires (DF)
Cabibi I, Dário, Ito, Kaya, Luís, Nandinho, Sidnei (MF)
Diawara, Erivaldo, Luiz Phellype (FW)
João Paulo Costa (Head Coach)

== See also ==
- 2016 Girabola
- 2017 Angola Super Cup
- 2017 CAF Confederation Cup
- Recreativo do Libolo players
- Progresso do Sambizanga players
