= 2013 Angola Super Cup =

Petro de Luanda	Recreativo do Libolo
Girabola	Taça Angola
2	1
- on aggregate

First leg
Petro de Luanda	Recreativo do Libolo
1	0
- Date: 20 February 2013
- Venue: Estádio 11 de Novembro, Luanda
- Referee: Paulo Talaya

Second leg
Recreativo do Libolo	Petro de Luanda
1	1
- Date: 24 February 2013
- Venue: Estádio Municipal de Calulo, Calulo

The 2013 Supertaça de Angola (26th edition) was contested by Recreativo do Libolo, the 2012 Girabola champion and Petro de Luanda, the 2012 Angola cup winner. It was the last such competition to be played in a two leg format. On home court, Petro beat Libolo 1–0 to secure their 1st title as the away match in Calulo ended in a draw.

== Match details ==
=== First leg ===
20 February 2013
16:00

Petro de Luanda	1–0	Recreativo do Libolo
Job 88' (pen.)	Report

Estádio 11 de Novembro, Luanda
Attendance: 15,000
Referee: Paulo Talaya

Petro	Libolo

GK	12	(Angola) Jotabé
RB	21	(Angola) Mabiná
CB	7	(Angola) Etah
CB	27	(Angola) Bastos
LB	15	(Angola) Borges
RM	26	(Angola) Dany
CM	5	(Angola) Osório		(substituted off) 58'
CM	8	(Angola) Chara (c)
LM	11	(Angola) Job
CF	16	(Angola) Flávio		(substituted off) 72'
CF	17	(Ghana) Acheampong		(substituted off) 46'
Substitutions:
DF	13	(Angola) Isaac		(substituted in) 46'
FW	4	(Angola) Kembua	(yellow card) 75'	(substituted in) 58'
FW	18	(Angola) Mabululu		(substituted in) 72'
Manager:
(Angola) Miller Gomes

GK	1	(Angola) Lando
RB	2	(Angola) Mussumari
CB	5	(Angola) Gomito
CB	21	(Portugal) Pedro Ribeiro	(yellow card) 57'
LB	27	(Angola) Carlitos
RM	14	(Angola) Vado	(yellow card) 85'
CM	8	(Cape Verde) Sidnei
CM	20	(Angola) Dário		(substituted off) 64'
LM	26	(Mozambique) Manú Lopes	(yellow card) 7'
CF	15	(Angola) Quinzinho	(yellow card) 59'
CF	24	(Angola) Rasca		(substituted off) 72'
Substitutions:
MF	23	(Argentina) Andrés Madrid		(substituted in) 64'
MF	13	(Angola) João Martins		(substituted in) 72'
Manager:
(Portugal) Henrique Calisto

Assistant referees:
Wilson Ntyamba
Inácio Cândido
Fourth official:
Maximina Bernardo

=== Second leg ===
24 February 2013
15:00

Recreativo do Libolo	1–1	Petro de Luanda
Dário 64'	Report	86' Job

Estádio Municipal de Calulo, Calulo

Libolo	Petro

GK	1	(Angola) Lando
RB	2	(Angola) Mussumari
CB	5	(Angola) Gomito	(yellow card) 56'
CB	21	(Portugal) Pedro Ribeiro
LB	27	(Angola) Carlitos	(yellow card) 34'
RM	20	(Angola) Dário
CM	8	(Cape Verde) Sidnei (c)		(substituted off) 86'
CM	26	(Mozambique) Manú Lopes
LM	14	(Angola) Vado		(substituted off) 46'
CF	13	(Angola) João Martins		(substituted off) 39'
CF	24	(Angola) Rasca
Substitutions:
MF	23	(Argentina) Andrés Madrid	(yellow card) 65'	(substituted in) 39'
MF	16	(Portugal) Pedro Mendes		(substituted in) 46'
MF	9	(Guinea) Camara		(substituted in) 86'
Manager:
(Portugal) Henrique Calisto

GK	12	(Angola) Jotabé
RB	21	(Angola) Mabiná	(yellow card) 42'
CB	7	(Angola) Etah
CB	27	(Angola) Bastos
LB	15	(Angola) Borges	(yellow card) 58'
RM	8	(Angola) Chara (c)
CM	5	(Angola) Osório
CM	9	(Angola) Buá		(substituted off) 64'
LM	26	(Angola) Dany
CF	11	(Angola) Job
CF	16	(Angola) Flávio		(substituted off) 60'
Substitutions:
FW	18	(Angola) Mabululu		(substituted in) 60'
DF	13	(Angola) Isaac		(substituted in) 64'
Manager:
(Angola) Miller Gomes

Assistant referees:

Fourth official:

2013 Angola Football Super Cup winner

Atlético Petróleos de Luanda
6th title

Squad: Acheampong, Bastos, Ben Traoré, Borges, Buá, Cassoma, Chara, Dany, Diógenes, Eddie, Etah, F.Katongo, Filhão, Flávio, Isaac, Job, Jotabé, Kembua, Keita, Lamá, Lelo, Loló, Lumeca, Mabiná, Mabululu, Manguxi, Mano, Mateus, Mig, Miguel, Mira, Nari, Nelson, Osório
Head coach: Miller Gomes

== See also ==
- 2012 Angola Cup
- 2012 Girabola
- Petro de Luanda players
- Recreativo do Libolo players
