= 2014 Girabola =

Girabola
- Season: 2014
- Champions: Recreativo do Libolo
- Relegated: 1º de Maio; Benfica Lubango; União SC
- Champions League: Rec do Libolo (winner); Kabuscorp (runner-up)
- Matches played: 240
- Goals scored: 509 (2.12 per match)
- Top goalscorer: Albert Meyong (17)
- Biggest home win: Petro de Luanda 6-1 União Uíge; Rec da Caála 5-0 Interclube; Bravos Maquis 5-0 União Uíge
- Biggest away win: Benfica Lubango 0-5 1º de Agosto
- Highest scoring: Petro de Luanda 6-1 União Uíge; Petro de Luanda 5-2 Desp da Huíla
- Longest winning run: Recreativo do Libolo (8)
- Longest unbeaten run: Recreativo do Libolo (17)
- Longest winless run: 1º de Maio; União Uíge (14)
- Longest losing run: União do Uíge (8)

The 2014 Girabola was the 36th season of top-tier football league in Angola. The season ran from 21 February to 8 November 2014. Kabuscorp were the defending champions, having won their first Angolan championship in 2013.

The league comprised 16 teams, the bottom three of which were relegated to the 2015 Segundona.

== Teams ==
A total of 16 teams contested the league, including 13 sides from the 2013 season and three promoted from the 2013 Segundona, Benfica do Lubango, Sporting de Cabinda, União SC do Uíge. On the other hand, Porcelana FC, Atlético do Namibe, Santos FC were the last three teams of the 2013 season and played in the Segundona for the 2014 season. Kabuscorp were the defending champions from the 2013 season.

=== Stadiums and locations ===
Locations of the 2014 Girabola teams

Team	Home city	Stadium	Capacity	2013 season
ASA	Luanda	Estádio da Cidadela	60,000	12th in Girabola
Benfica de Luanda	Luanda	Estádio dos Coqueiros	8,000	10th in Girabola
Benfica do Lubango	Lubango	Estádio Nossa Senhora do Monte	14,000	2nd place in Segundona
Bravos do Maquis	Luena	Estádio Mundunduleno	4,300	3rd in Girabola
Desportivo da Huíla	Lubango	Estádio da Tundavala	25,000	6th in Girabola
Interclube	Luanda	Estádio 22 de Junho	7,000	7th in Girabola
Kabuscorp	Luanda	Estádio dos Coqueiros	8,000	Girabola Champions
Petro de Luanda	Luanda	Estádio 11 de Novembro	50,000	4th in Girabola
Primeiro de Agosto	Luanda	Estádio 11 de Novembro	50,000	2nd in Girabola
Primeiro de Maio	Benguela	Estádio Edelfride Costa	6,000	13th in Girabola
Progresso do Sambizanga	Luanda	Estádio dos Coqueiros	8,000	9th in Girabola
Recreativo da Caála	Caála	Estádio Mártires da Canhala	12,000	11th in Girabola
Recreativo do Libolo	Calulo	Estádio Municipal de Calulo	10,000	8th in Girabola
Sagrada Esperança	Dundo	Estádio Sagrada Esperança	8,000	5th in Girabola
Sporting de Cabinda	Cabinda	Estádio Nacional do Chiazi	25,000	1st place in Segundona
União do Uíge	Uíge	Estádio 4 de Janeiro	12,000	3rd place in Segundona

== Changes from 2013 season ==
Relegated: Atlético do Namibe, Porcelana FC, Santos FC
Promoted: Benfica do Lubango, Sporting de Cabinda, Progresso do Sambizanga

== League table ==
Pos	Team	Pld	W	D	L	GF	GA	GD	Pts	Qualification or relegation
1	Recreativo do Libolo (C)	30	20	9	1	39	13	+26	69	Qualification for Champions League
2	Kabuscorp	30	17	9	4	44	27	+17	60	Qualification for Champions League
3	Benfica de Luanda	30	14	13	3	31	18	+13	55	
4	Primeiro de Agosto	30	16	4	10	49	31	+18	52	
5	Petro de Luanda	30	13	9	8	43	27	+16	48	
6	Bravos do Maquis	30	11	11	8	32	23	+9	44	
7	Recreativo da Caála	30	10	10	10	34	29	+5	40	
8	Sagrada Esperança	30	8	16	6	27	24	+3	40	
9	Interclube	30	11	6	13	29	38	−9	39	
10	Progresso do Sambizanga	30	9	10	11	31	33	−2	37	
11	Desportivo da Huíla	30	9	5	16	28	42	−14	32	
12	Sporting de Cabinda	30	7	10	13	25	31	−6	31	
13	ASA	30	8	7	15	28	35	−7	31	
14	Primeiro de Maio (R)	30	6	10	14	29	40	−11	28	Relegation to Provincial stages
15	Benfica do Lubango (R)	30	5	7	18	24	50	−26	22	Relegation to Provincial stages
16	União SC do Uíge (R)	30	5	6	19	16	48	−32	21	Relegation to Provincial stages

Updated to match(es) played on 5 November 2014. Source: Girabola.com
Rules for classification: 1) Points; 2) Head-to-head points; 3) Head-to-head goal difference; 4) Goal difference; 5) Goals scored; 6) Fair-play points; 7) Play-off.
(C) Champions; (R) Relegated

== Results ==
Home \ Away	ASA	BEN	BLB	BRA	DES	INT	KAB	PET	PRI	MAI	PRO	CAA	LIB	SAG	SCC	USU
ASA	—	0–1	0–2	0–0	1–0	1–2	1–2	1–2	3–1	2–1	1–1	2–0	1–3	3–2	3–0	1–0
Benfica de Luanda	3–0	—	2–2	1–0	1–0	1–0	0–1	1–0	0–2	0–0	2–1	1–0	1–1	1–1	1–1	2–0
Benfica do Lubango	1–1	1–1	—	0–1	0–0	1–2	1–1	2–3	0–5	3–2	1–0	2–0	1–3	1–1	1–2	0–1
Bravos do Maquis	2–1	0–0	2–0	—	2–1	1–2	2–2	0–0	3–2	1–1	2–0	0–1	0–0	2–2	0–1	5–0
Desportivo da Huíla	2–0	0–2	2–0	0–1	—	0–3	0–2	2–1	2–2	2–0	1–0	1–0	1–4	0–1	1–0	3–2
Interclube	0–2	0–0	2–1	1–2	2–0	—	1–3	2–1	0–3	3–1	0–1	2–2	0–1	1–2	1–0	1–0
Kabuscorp	1–0	0–1	1–0	2–1	2–0	1–0	—	0–1	3–2	2–1	2–2	3–1	0–0	0–0	3–2	2–1
Petro de Luanda	0–0	2–0	1–1	1–1	5–2	0–0	2–0	—	1–2	0–1	2–1	1–0	1–1	1–1	2–0	6–1
Primeiro de Agosto	2–1	1–2	3–1	1–0	2–1	3–0	1–1	2–1	—	2–0	3–1	0–1	1–2	0–0	2–1	1–0
Primeiro de Maio	0–0	1–1	0–1	2–1	1–1	0–2	2–3	1–1	2–1	—	2–2	1–1	1–2	2–0	2–2	1–0
Progresso do Sambizanga	2–1	0–1	2–0	0–1	2–3	2–2	2–2	1–0	1–0	3–2	—	0–0	0–2	0–0	2–2	1–1
Recreativo da Caála	2–2	1–1	2–1	1–0	3–2	5–0	1–1	0–1	0–0	2–1	0–1	—	0–1	1–1	1–0	4–1
Recreativo do Libolo	1–0	1–1	2–0	0–0	1–0	2–0	1–0	1–2	2–1	1–0	1–0	1–1	—	1–0	0–0	2–1
Sagrada Esperança	1–0	1–1	3–0	0–0	0–0	0–0	0–2	2–1	1–2	0–0	0–1	2–1	0–0	—	2–0	1–1
Sporting de Cabinda	1–0	1–1	3–0	1–2	1–1	2–0	0–1	1–1	0–1	1–0	0–0	0–0	0–1	1–1	—	1–1
União do Uíge	0–0	0–1	2–0	0–0	1–0	0–0	1–1	2–0	2–1	0–1	0–0	0–0	0–1	1–2	1–0	—

Updated to match(es) played on 5 November 2014. Source: girabola.com
Legend: Blue = home team win; Yellow = draw; Red = away team win.

== Season statistics ==
=== Top scorers ===
Rank	Scorer	Club	Goals
1	(Cameroon) Albert Meyong	Kabuscorp	17
2	(Angola) Ary Papel	1º de Agosto	13
2	(Senegal) Ladji Keita	Petro de Luanda	13
2	(Brazil) Fabrício	Recreativo da Caála	13
5	(Angola) Patrick II	Sagrada Esperança	12
6	(Angola) Dário	Recreativo do Libolo	10
6	(Angola) Chiquinho	Desportivo da Huíla	10
8	(Democratic Republic of the Congo) Bissio	ASA	9
8	(Angola) Gelson	1º de Agosto	9
10	(Angola) Bena	Desportivo da Huíla	8

=== Hat-tricks ===
Player	For	Against	Result	Date
Job	Petro de Luanda	União do Uíge	6-1	7 May 2014

2014 Girabola winner
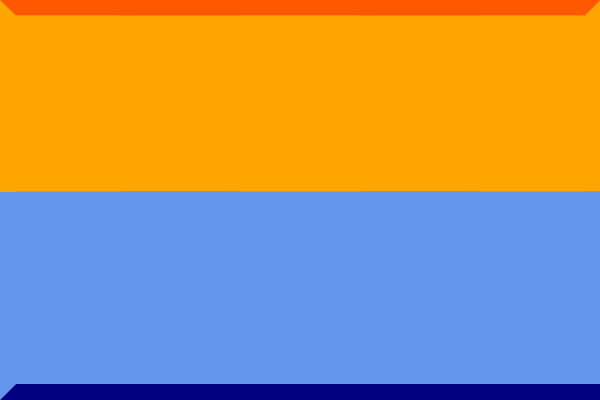
Clube Recreativo Desportivo do Libolo
3rd title

Squad: Adilson, Boka, Carlitos, Chico, Dany, Dário, Diawara, Eddie, Edy Boyom, Evandro, Fuky, Gomito, Kaya, Landu, Mbongo, Mig, Mingo Sanda, Nílton, Pedrito,
Pedro Mendes, Quinzinho, Sidnei, Wires
Head coach: Miller Gomes

== See also ==
- 2014 Segundona
