= 2012 Angola Cup =

Tournament details
- Country: Angola
- Dates: 26 May – 11 Nov 2012
- Teams: 20

Final positions
- Champions: Petro de Luanda
- Runners-up: Recreativo da Caála
- Confederation Cup: Petro Atlético (winner); Rec da Caála (runner-up)

Tournament statistics
- Matches played: 19

The 2012 Angola Cup (Taça de Angola) was the 31st edition of what is considered the second most important (and the top knock-out) football club competition in Angola, following the Girabola. Petro de Luanda beat Rec da Caála 1–0 in the final to secure its 9th title.

The winner and the runner-up qualified to 2013 CAF Confederation Cup.

== Stadia and locations ==
Locations of the 2012 Angola Cup teams

P	Team	Home city	Stadium	Capacity	2011	Current	P
6	Académica do Lobito	Lobito	Estádio do Buraco	3,000	PR	PR	Steady
4	Académica do Soyo	Soyo	Estádio dos Imbondeiros	10,000	DNP	QF	n/a
5	ASA	Luanda	Estádio da Cidadela	60,000	R16	R16	Steady
6	Atlético do Namibe	Namibe	Estádio Joaquim Morais	5,000	PR	PR	Steady
4	Benfica de Luanda	Luanda	Estádio dos Coqueiros	8,000	SF	QF	▼1
5	Bravos do Maquis	Luena	Estádio Mundunduleno	4,300	R16	R16	Steady
5	Domant FC	Caxito	Estádio Municipal	5,000	QF	R16	▼1
5	Evale FC	Ondjiva	Estádio dos Castilhos	429	DNP	R16	n/a
4	Interclube	Luanda	Estádio 22 de Junho	7,000	Champion	QF	▼4
5	Kabuscorp	Luanda	Estádio dos Coqueiros	8,000	QF	R16	▼1
6	Nacional de Benguela	Benguela	Estádio de São Filipe	10,000	DNP	PR	n/a
5	Norberto de Castro	Luanda	Estádio dos Coqueiros	8,000	R16	R16	Steady
1	Petro de Luanda	Luanda	Estádio 11 de Novembro	50,000	PR	Champion	▲5
5	Primeiro de Agosto	Luanda	Estádio 11 de Novembro	50,000	Runner-Up	R16	▼3
3	Progresso do Sambizanga	Luanda	Estádio dos Coqueiros	8,000	R16	SF	▲2
3	Recreativo da Caála	Caála	Estádio Mártires da Canhala	12,000	QF	SF	▲1
4	Recreativo do Libolo	Calulo	Estádio Municipal de Calulo	10,000	R16	QF	▲1
5	Sagrada Esperança	Dundo	Estádio Sagrada Esperança	8,000	R16	R16	Steady
5	Santos FC	Luanda	Estádio dos Coqueiros	8,000	QF	R16	▼1
6	Sporting de Cabinda	Cabinda	Estádio Nacional do Chiazi	25,000	R16	PR	n/a

== Championship bracket ==
Preliminary Rounds; Sat, 26 May 2012
Sat, 26 May 2012 Walkover
Evale FC	3
Sporting Cabinda	0
Sat, 26 May 2012 Walkover
Domant FC	3
Académica Lobito	0
Sat, 26 May 2012
Nacional Benguela	1
Santos FC	3
Sat, 26 May 2012 (pen)
Norberto Castro	7
Atlético Namibe	6

1/16 Finals; Wed, 25 Jul 2012
Wed, 25 Jul 2012
Rec do Libolo	4
Evale FC	0
Wed, 25 Jul 2012 (pen)
Petro Luanda	6
1º de Agosto	5
Wed, 25 Jul 2012
Académica Soyo	2
Domant FC	1
Wed, 25 Jul 2012 (pen)
Kabuscorp	2
Progresso	4
Wed, 25 Jul 2012 (pen)
Santos FC	3
Rec da Caála	4
Wed, 25 Jul 2012
Interclube	3
Norberto Castro	1
Wed, 25 Jul 2012 (pen)
Benfica Luanda	4
ASA	1
Wed, 25 Jul 2012 (pen)
Bravos Maquis	3
Sagrada Esperança	4

Quarterfinals; Wed, 26 Sep 2012
Wed, 26 Sep 2012 (pen)
Rec do Libolo	5
Petro Luanda	6
Wed, 26 Sep 2012
Académica Soyo	0
Progresso	1
Wed, 26 Sep 2012 (pen)
Rec da Caála	4
Interclube	2
Wed, 26 Sep 2012
Benfica Luanda	1
Sagrada Esperança	2

Semifinals; Wed, 31 Oct 2012
Wed, 31 Oct 2012
Petro Luanda	2
Progresso	0
Wed, 31 Oct 2012 (pen)
Sagrada Esperança	5
Rec da Caála	6

Final; Mon, 11 Nov 2012
Mon, 11 Nov 2012
Petro de Luanda	2
Rec da Caála	0

== Preliminary rounds ==
Sat, 26 May 2012 R16	Evale FC	Walkover	Sporting Cabinda	Ondjiva
15:00 WAT (UTC+1)				Stadium: Castilhos

Sat, 26 May 2012 R16	Domant FC	Walkover	Académica Lobito	Caxito
15:00 WAT (UTC+1)				Stadium: Municipal do Dande

Sat, 26 May 2012 R16	Nacional Benguela	1–3	Santos FC	Benguela
15:00 WAT (UTC+1)				Stadium: São Filipe

Sat, 26 May 2012 R16	Norberto Castro	2–2 (a.e.t.) (5–4 p)	Atlético Namibe	Luanda
15:00 WAT (UTC+1)				Stadium: Coqueiros

== Round of 16 ==
Wed, 25 Jul 2012 R16	Rec do Libolo	4–0	Evale FC	Calulo
15:00 WAT (UTC+1)				Stadium: Municipal de Calulo

Wed, 25 Jul 2012 R16	Petro Luanda	1–1 (a.e.t.) (5–4 p)	1º de Agosto	Luanda
15:00 WAT (UTC+1)	Love 40'	Report	25' Jiresse	Stadium: 11 de Novembro
	Penalties
	Ben Traoré (penalty scored); Kembua (penalty scored); Mateus (penalty scored); Mira (penalty scored); Etah (penalty scored)		(penalty scored) Dani; (penalty scored) Amaro; (penalty scored) Jiresse; (penalty scored) Ary Papel; (penalty missed) Manucho

Wed, 25 Jul 2012 R16	Académica Soyo	2–1	Domant FC	Soyo
15:00 WAT (UTC+1)				Stadium: Imbondeiros

Wed, 25 Jul 2012 R16	Kabuscorp	0–0 (a.e.t.) (2–4 p)	Progresso	Luanda
15:00 WAT (UTC+1)		Report	(yellow card) 51' Luís	Stadium: Cidadela; Attendance: 10.000; Referee: Osvaldo Felix; José Felix, Ricardo Pedro

Wed, 25 Jul 2012 R16	Santos FC	0–0 (a.e.t.) (3–4 p)	Rec da Caála	Luanda
15:00 WAT (UTC+1)

Wed, 25 Jul 2012 R16	Interclube	3–1	Norberto Castro	Luanda
15:00 WAT (UTC+1)	Baptiste Faye 3', 67', 74'		8' Nelinho	Stadium: 22 de Junho

Wed, 25 Jul 2012 R16	Benfica Luanda	0–0 (a.e.t.) (4–1 p)	ASA	Luanda
16:00 WAT (UTC+1)				Stadium: 11 de Novembro; Attendance: 5.000

Wed, 25 Jul 2012 R16	Bravos do Maquis	0–0 (a.e.t.) (3–4 p)	Sagrada Esperança	Luena
15:00 WAT (UTC+1)		Report		Stadium: Mundunduleno; Attendance: 2.000; Referee: Venâncio Daniel; Wilson Ntyamba, Luís Maria

== Quarter-finals ==
Wed, 26 Sep 2012 QF	Rec do Libolo	1–1 (a.e.t.) (4–5 p)	Petro Luanda	Calulo
15:00 WAT (UTC+1)				Stadium: Municipal de Calulo

Wed, 26 Sep 2012 QF	Académica Soyo	0–1	Progresso	Soyo
15:00 WAT (UTC+1)		Report		Stadium: Imbondeiros; Referee: Pedro dos Santos; Sebastião da Silva, Miguel Luvumbo

Wed, 26 Sep 2012 QF	Rec da Caála	0–0 (a.e.t.) (4–2 p)	Interclube	Lubango
15:00 WAT (UTC+1)		Report		Stadium: Estádio do Ferrovia; Attendance: 1.000; Referee: Paulo Talaya; Ricardo Catchicume, Joaquim Chio
	Penalties
	Nuno (penalty scored); Marinho (penalty scored); Careca (penalty scored); Edson (penalty scored); Femi (penalty missed)		(penalty scored) Joel; (penalty scored) Baptiste Faye; (penalty missed) Nari; (penalty missed) Fabrício

Wed, 26 Sep 2012 QF	Benfica de Luanda	1–2	Sagrada Esperança	Luanda
18:00 WAT (UTC+1)	Hippi	Report	Guedes	Stadium: Coqueiros

== Semi-finals ==
Wed, 31 Oct 2012 SF	Petro Luanda	2–0	Progresso	Luanda
15:00 WAT (UTC+1)	Mabiná 16'; Ben Traoré 90+3'	Report		Stadium: 11 de Novembro

Wed, 31 Oct 2012 SF	Sagrada Esperança	1–1 (a.e.t.) (4–5 p)	Rec da Caála	Dundo
15:00 WAT (UTC+1)				Stadium: Sagrada Esperança

== Final ==
Sun, 11 November 2012
16:00

Petro de Luanda	2–0	Recreativo da Caála
Mabululu 71' 90+2'

Estádio 11 de Novembro, Luanda
Attendance: 10,000
Referee: Hélder Martins

Petro	Caála

GK	1	(Angola) Lamá	(yellow card) 84'
RB	24	(Angola) Mira		(substituted off) 66'
CB	7	(Cameroon) Etah
CB	27	(Angola) Bastos
LB	3	(Angola) Miguel
RM	21	(Angola) Mabiná
CM	8	(Angola) Chara (c)
CM	5	(Angola) Osório
LM	11	(Angola) Job
CF	9	(Angola) Love		(substituted off) 85'
CF	32	(Angola) Mabululu		(substituted off) 90+3'
Substitutions:
MF	14	(Angola) Mateus		(substituted on) 66'
DF	2	(Angola) Loló		(substituted on) 85'
FW	19	(Angola) Ben Traoré		(substituted on) 90+3'
Manager:
(Angola) Miller Gomes

GK	12	(Democratic Republic of the Congo) Lokwa
RB	8	(Portugal) Mangualde	(yellow card) 59'	(substituted off) 84'
CB	–	(Angola) Kikas
CB	30	(Portugal) Marinho	(yellow card) 90'
LB	13	(Portugal) Nuno
RM	6	(Angola) Edson
CM	14	(Angola) Vovó		(substituted off) 58'
CM	19	(Angola) Dudú Leite		(substituted off) 74'
LM	11	(Nigeria) Femi
CF	7	(Senegal) Alioune
CF	15	(Angola) Paizinho
Substitutions:
MF	–	(Angola) Maurito		(substituted on) 58'
MF	21	(Angola) Careca		(substituted on) 74'
MF	20	(Angola) Garcia		(substituted on) 84'
Manager:
(Angola) Fernando Pereira

Assistant referees:
Ricardo Daniel
Jerson Emiliano

2012 Angola Football Cup winner

9th title

Squad:
Dadão, Jotabé, Lamá, Nelson (GK)
Abdul, Bastos, Cassoma, Etah, Loló, Mabiná, Mira (DF)
Chara, Dany, Day Day, Felix Katongo, Job, Mano, Osório (MF)
Ben Traoré, Chiló, Kembua, Love, Mabululu, Santana (FW)
Miller Gomes (Head Coach)

== See also ==
- 2012 Girabola
- 2013 Angola Super Cup
- 2013 CAF Confederation Cup
- Petro de Luanda players
- Recreativo da Caála players
