= 2012 Girabola =

Girabola 2012
- Season: 2012 (Mar 3–Nov 4)
- Champions: Rec Libolo
- Relegated: Acad. Soyo; Sp. Cabinda; N. Benguela
- Champions League: R. do Libolo (winner); 1º de Agosto (runner-up)
- Matches: 240
- Goals: 549 (2.29 per match)
- Top goalscorer: Yano (14 goals)

The 2012 Girabola was the 34th season of top-tier football in Angola. It ran from 3 March to 4 November 2012 and involved 16 teams, the bottom three of which were relegated to 2013 Segundona.

== Changes from 2011 season ==
Relegated: FC de Cabinda, Primeiro de Maio, Académica do Lobito
Promoted: Atlético do Namibe, Sporting de Cabinda, Nacional de Benguela

Locations of the 2012 Girabola teams

== League table ==
Pos	Team	Pld	W	D	L	GF	GA	GD	Pts	Qualification or relegation
1	Recreativo do Libolo (C)	30	19	10	1	51	14	+37	67	Qualification for Champions League
2	Primeiro de Agosto	30	17	7	6	42	21	+21	58	Qualification for Champions League
3	Petro de Luanda	30	14	12	4	34	17	+17	54	
4	Kabuscorp	30	14	10	6	43	30	+13	52	
5	Interclube	30	12	11	7	34	23	+11	47	
6	ASA	30	10	11	9	24	22	+2	41	
7	Progresso do Sambizanga	30	9	13	8	30	26	+4	40	
8	Bravos do Maquis	30	11	7	12	41	41	0	40	
9	Atlético do Namibe	30	10	7	13	37	48	−11	37	
10	Recreativo da Caála	30	9	8	13	26	31	−5	35	
11	Sagrada Esperança	30	8	10	12	29	32	−3	34	
12	Benfica de Luanda	30	7	13	10	32	37	−5	34	
13	Santos FC	30	9	7	14	41	46	−5	34	
14	Académica do Soyo (R)	30	9	5	16	31	46	−15	32	Relegation to Provincial stages
15	Sporting de Cabinda (R)	30	5	7	18	28	61	−33	22	Relegation to Provincial stages
16	Nacional de Benguela (R)	30	4	8	18	24	52	−28	20	Relegation to Provincial stages

Updated to match(es) played on 6 November 2012. Source: Girabola.com
Rules for classification: 1) Points; 2) Head-to-head points; 3) Head-to-head goal difference; 4) Goal difference; 5) Goals scored; 6) Fair-play points; 7) Play-off.
(C) Champions; (R) Relegated

== Results ==
Home \ Away	ACS	ASA	ATN	BEN	BRA	INT	KAB	NAC	PET	PRI	PRO	CAA	LIB	SAG	SAN	SCC
Académica do Soyo	—	1–0	2–3	1–0	0–2	1–1	1–1	1–0	0–2	0–3	1–1	3–1	0–1	2–1	0–2	3–2
ASA	1–0	—	0–3	0–1	1–1	3–1	0–0	2–0	0–0	0–1	1–0	0–0	0–1	1–0	1–1	2–0
Atlético do Namibe	0–1	1–1	—	1–1	2–1	1–1	3–1	2–1	0–0	0–1	0–2	2–1	1–3	1–0	0–1	3–0
Benfica de Luanda	0–0	2–1	2–3	—	1–1	1–0	0–3	2–0	0–1	1–1	0–0	0–0	0–0	2–2	2–2	2–2
Bravos do Maquis	5–2	0–1	4–2	3–1	—	0–1	0–1	2–1	0–3	0–1	2–0	2–1	0–1	1–1	4–0	4–2
Interclube	1–0	0–0	4–1	1–2	1–1	—	1–1	3–0	1–0	1–1	0–0	3–0	0–1	1–0	2–3	2–1
Kabuscorp	5–3	0–2	2–0	0–0	4–1	0–2	—	2–1	1–1	0–0	0–1	3–1	1–2	3–2	1–0	2–0
Nacional de Benguela	3–2	1–1	2–2	0–1	0–1	1–3	1–2	—	3–4	1–2	2–1	1–0	0–0	1–1	1–0	1–1
Petro de Luanda	1–0	1–0	3–0	3–2	0–0	1–0	1–1	0–0	—	0–2	0–1	0–0	2–2	2–1	0–0	2–0
Primeiro de Agosto	1–0	0–1	4–1	0–2	3–1	0–1	1–0	4–0	0–2	—	1–1	1–0	0–1	1–0	2–0	4–1
Progresso do Sambizanga	1–1	1–1	0–0	3–1	1–1	0–2	1–2	0–0	3–1	1–1	—	2–0	1–1	2–0	3–2	1–1
Recreativo da Caála	0–1	2–0	1–0	3–2	2–0	1–1	2–3	2–0	0–0	1–1	1–0	—	0–0	0–0	2–0	1–0
Recreativo do Libolo	3–0	1–0	4–0	1–1	3–0	0–0	2–0	6–1	0–0	0–0	1–0	3–2	—	1–0	1–0	7–0
Sagrada Esperança	1–0	1–2	0–2	2–1	1–1	0–1	2–2	0–0	0–0	2–1	1–0	2–1	1–1	—	1–0	3–0
Santos FC	4–2	1–1	5–3	1–1	1–2	2–0	1–1	3–2	0–1	2–3	0–0	0–1	4–2	1–3	—	2–3
Sporting de Cabinda	0–3	1–1	0–0	2–1	3–1	1–1	0–1	2–0	0–3	1–2	2–3	1–0	0–2	1–1	1–3	—

Updated to match(es) played on 6 November 2012. Source: girabola.com
Legend: Blue = home team win; Yellow = draw; Red = away team win.

== Season statistics ==
=== Top scorers ===
Rank	Scorer	Club	Goals
1	(Angola) Yano	Progresso	14
2	(Angola) Mingo Bile	1º de Agosto	12
3	(Angola) Álvaro	Atlético do Namibe	11
3	(Brazil) Rivaldo	Kabuscorp	11
4	(Angola) Kembua	Petro de Luanda	10
4	(Angola) Pedro	Benfica de Luanda	10
4	(Angola) Mpele Mpele	Kabuscorp	10
5	(Angola) Rasca	Recreativo do Libolo	9
6	(Angola) David	ASA	8

As of 4 November 2012

=== Hat-tricks ===
Player	For	Against	Result	Date
Rivaldo	Kabuscorp	Bravos do Maquis	4-1	28 July 2012
Rasca	Recreativo do Libolo	Nacional de Benguela	6-1	5 May 2012
Mpele Mpele	Kabuscorp	Benfica de Luanda	3-0	20 April 2012
Yano	Progresso Sambizanga	Santos FC	3-0	16 April 2012
Didí	Santos FC	Interclube	3-2	31 March 2012
Rivaldo	Kabuscorp	Recreativo da Caála	3-1	17 March 2012

2012 Girabola winner

2nd title

Squad: Adawa, Aguinaldo, Ary, Bota, Henri Camara, Carlitos, Chico Caputo, Dário
Edy Boyom, Fernando, Fredy, Gomito, Guilherme, João Tomás, Lameirão, Landu, Manú, Mussumari, Nílton, Quinzinho, Rasca, Ruben, Sidnei, Totó, Vado, Valdir, Viola
Head coach: Zeca Amaral
