= Ricardo Batista (footballer) =

Portuguese footballer

Personal information
- Full name: Ricardo Jorge Cecília Batista
- Date of birth: 19 November 1986 (age 39)
- Place of birth: Torres Vedras, Portugal
- Height: 1.90 m (6 ft 3 in)
- Position: Goalkeeper

Team information
- Current team: Lusitano Évora (on loan from Casa Pia)
- Number: 31

Youth career
- 1998–2004: Vitória Setúbal

Senior career*
Years	Team	Apps	(Gls)
2004–2008	Fulham	0	(0)
2006	→ Milton Keynes Dons (loan)	9	(0)
2006	→ Wycombe Wanderers (loan)	16	(0)
2007	→ Wycombe Wanderers (loan)	13	(0)
2008–2011	Sporting CP	0	(0)
2010–2011	→ Olhanense (loan)	11	(0)
2013–2014	Nacional	0	(0)
2014–2015	Vitória Setúbal	17	(0)
2015–2017	Libolo	20	(0)
2018–2020	Gaz Metan Mediaș	3	(0)
2020–	Casa Pia	121	(0)
2026–	→ Lusitano Évora (loan)	0	(0)

International career
2004	Portugal U19	2	(0)
2005–2006	Portugal U20	3	(0)
2007–2008	Portugal U21	15	(0)
2009–2011	Portugal U23	2	(0)
- * Club domestic league appearances and goals as of 11:35, 16 January 2026 (UTC)

Ricardo Jorge Cecília Batista (born 19 November 1986) is a professional footballer who plays as a goalkeeper for Liga 3 club Lusitano Évora on loan from Casa Pia.

He totalled 95 Primeira Liga appearances over six seasons, for Olhanense, Vitória de Setúbal and Casa Pia. He also played in England (with Fulham, Milton Keynes Dons and Wycombe Wanderers), Angola and Romania.

Batista won caps for Portugal at under-21 level. In 2024, he switched his allegiance to Angola.

== Club career ==
=== Fulham ===
Born in Torres Vedras, Lisbon District to a Cape Verdean father and an Angolan mother, Batista started his career with Vitória F.C. in his hometown. In late 2004, aged only 18, he was signed by English Premier League club Fulham. His only senior appearance for them was on 21 September 2005 in the second round of the League Cup against Lincoln City: his team won 5–4, but BBC Sport's match reporter dubbed his performance "disappointing".

Batista spent the second half of 2005–06 on loan to Milton Keynes Dons, for whom he played nine League Two matches. For most of the following season he was on loan to League One side Wycombe Wanderers. He made 35 appearances in all competitions and helped them reach the League Cup semi-final, in which they held Chelsea to a 1–1 draw in the first leg before losing the second 4–0.

In July 2007, Batista extended his contract at Craven Cottage to run until 2009.

=== Sporting CP ===
On 16 July 2008, Batista signed with Sporting CP for a fee of €158,000. He was only third choice during his two-year spell with the Lisbon club, his input consisting of the match against F.C. Paços de Ferreira in the 2008–09 edition of the Taça da Liga (5–1 home win).

Batista was loaned to S.C. Olhanense for the 2010–11 campaign, initially backing up Marcelo Moretto and playing in the domestic cups. After the Brazilian left for Poland he became the starter, as the Algarve team eventually retained their Primeira Liga status; his debut in the competition occurred on 19 December 2010, in a 0–0 home draw with C.D. Nacional.

On 25 July 2011, Batista was banned for two years for doping, after testing positive in a game against Académica de Coimbra held in January.

=== Later years ===
After his punishment, Batista represented Nacional and Vitória de Setúbal still in the Portuguese top division. He signed with Angola's C.R.D. Libolo in July 2015.

Batista returned to Portugal on 30 August 2020 following a two-year spell in the Romanian Liga I with CS Gaz Metan Mediaș where he only made four competitive appearances, barred by veteran Răzvan Pleșca, joining Liga Portugal 2 club Casa Pia A.C. on a one-year contract.

In 2021–22, Batista only missed two matches as Casa Pia finished second and returned to the top tier after an 83-year absence. For his performances, he was voted Goalkeeper of the Year.

== International career ==
Batista participated with Portugal at the 2007 UEFA European Under-21 Championship in the Netherlands, backing up FC Porto's Paulo Ribeiro. He made his debut in the category on 14 November 2006, in a 3–0 friendly win over Serbia.

On 6 March 2021, Batista was called up to represent the Angola national team. Three years later, he was picked for several 2025 Africa Cup of Nations qualifiers.

== Honours ==
Libolo

- Girabola: 2015
- Taça de Angola: 2016
- Supertaça de Angola: 2016

Individual

- Liga Portugal 2 Goalkeeper of the Year: 2021–22
- Liga Portugal 2 Team of the Season: 2021–22

== See also ==
- List of doping cases in sport
