= Luiz Phellype =

Brazilian footballer

Personal information
- Full name: Luiz Phellype Luciano Silva
- Date of birth: 27 September 1993 (age 33)
- Place of birth: São Gonçalo do Sapucaí, Brazil
- Height: 1.88 m (6 ft 2 in)
- Position: Forward

Team information
- Current team: CRB
- Number: 19

Youth career
- –2011: Desportivo Brasil

Senior career*
Years	Team	Apps	(Gls)
2011–2012	Desportivo Brasil	25	(5)
2012–2013	Standard Liége	3	(0)
2013–2017	Estoril	9	(0)
2013–2014	→ Beira-Mar (loan)	24	(6)
2014–2015	→ Feirense (loan)	34	(15)
2016	→ Recreativo do Libolo (loan)	24	(7)
2017–2019	Paços de Ferreira	51	(20)
2019–2023	Sporting CP	30	(14)
2021	Sporting CP B	9	(2)
2021	→ Santa Clara (loan)	8	(0)
2022	→ OFI (loan)	13	(8)
2022	→ FC Tokyo (loan)	12	(2)
2023–2024	OFI	41	(5)
2024–2025	Shonan Bellmare	24	(4)
2026–	CRB	16	(2)
- * Club domestic league appearances and goals as of 16 November 2026

Luiz Phellype Luciano Silva (born 27 September 1993), known as Luiz Phellype, is a Brazilian professional footballer who plays as a forward for CRB.

== Career ==
Luiz Phellype made his professional debut with Standard Liége in December 2012, a few months after arriving at the Belgian First Division A club from Brazil.

After two years playing for Paços de Ferreira, Luiz Phellype signed with Sporting CP, with players Rafael Barbosa and Elves Baldé moving to the opposite direction, on loan. He netted his first goal for the Lisbon side in a 3–1 away win against Chaves.

On 30 August 2021, he joined fellow Primeira Liga side Santa Clara on a season-long loan. On 27 January 2022, Luiz Phellype joined Super League Greece club OFI on a six-month loan. On 23 July 2022, Sporting sent him on loan to J1 League club FC Tokyo until the end of the 2022 season.

On 1 February 2023, Luiz Phellype left Sporting and returned to OFI, this time in a permanent transfer, signing a contract until June 2024. Sporting kept 50% of the player's economic rights.

On 19 August 2024, Luiz Phellype returned to Japan, this time on a permanent transfer, signing a one-and-a-half-year contract with J1 League club Shonan Bellmare. At the end of the 2025 season, his contract expired and he left the club.

== Career statistics ==
As of match played 8 November 2025

Appearances and goals by club, season and competition
Club	Season	League			National cup (Note: Includes Taça de Portugal, Taça de Angola, Greek Football Cup)		League cup (Note: Includes Taça da Liga)		Continental		Other		Total	
Club	Season	Division	Apps	Goals	Apps	Goals	Apps	Goals	Apps	Goals	Apps	Goals	Apps	Goals
Desportivo Brasil	2011	Paulista Série A2	10	2	—		—		—		—		10	2
Desportivo Brasil	2012	Paulista Série A2	15	3	—		—		—		—		15	3
Desportivo Brasil	Total		25	5	—		—		—		—		25	5
Standard Liège	2012–13	Belgian Pro League	3	0	0	0	—		—		—		3	0
Estoril	2013–14	Primeira Liga	1	0	0	0	0	0	0	0	—		1	0
Estoril	2015–16	Primeira Liga	8	0	2	0	1	1	—		—		11	1
Estoril	Total		9	0	2	0	1	1	0	0	—		12	1
Beira-Mar (loan)	2013–14	Segunda Liga	24	6	3	0	4	1	—		—		31	7
Feirense (loan)	2014–15	Segunda Liga	34	15	2	1	0	0	—		—		36	16
Recreativo do Libolo (loan)	2016	Girabola	24	7	3	2	—		4 (Note: Appearances in CAF Champions League)	3	1 (Note: Appearance in Supertaça de Angola)	1	32	13
Paços de Ferreira	2016–17	Primeira Liga	13	3	0	0	0	0	—		—		13	3
Paços de Ferreira	2017–18	Primeira Liga	25	8	1	1	3	2	—		—		29	11
Paços de Ferreira	2018–19	LigaPro	13	9	1	0	1	0	—		—		15	9
Paços de Ferreira	Total		51	20	2	1	4	2	—		—		57	23
Sporting CP	2018–19	Primeira Liga	14	8	4	0	1	0	2 (Note: Appearances in UEFA Europa League)	0	—		21	8
Sporting CP	2019–20	Primeira Liga	16	6	1	0	4	1	4	2	1 (Note: Appearance in Supertaça Cândido de Oliveira)	0	26	9
Sporting CP	Total		30	14	5	0	5	1	6	2	1	0	47	17
Sporting CP B	2020–21	Campeonato de Portugal	9	2	—		—		—		—		9	2
Santa Clara (loan)	2021–22	Primeira Liga	8	0	2	0	2	1	0	0	—		12	1
OFI (loan)	2021–22	Super League Greece	13	8	0	0	—		—		—		13	8
FC Tokyo (loan)	2022	J1 League	12	2	0	0	0	0	—		—		12	2
OFI	2022–23	Super League Greece	9	1	0	0	—		—		—		9	1
OFI	2023–24	Super League Greece	32	4	5	3	—		—		—		37	7
OFI	Total		41	5	5	3	—		—		—		46	8
Shonan Bellmare	2024	J1 League	4	0	0	0	0	0	—		—		4	0
Shonan Bellmare	2025	J1 League	20	4	2	0	6	1	—		—		28	5
Shonan Bellmare	Total		24	4	2	0	6	1	—		—		32	5
Career total			307	88	26	7	22	7	10	5	2	1	367	108

== Honours ==
Recreativo do Libolo

- Supertaça de Angola: 2016

Sporting CP

- Taça da Liga: 2018–19
- Taça de Portugal: 2018–19

Individual

- Primeira Liga Forward of the Month: April 2019

== Personal life ==
Luiz Phellype is the brother of Fabinho, also a footballer.
