= Edy-Nicolas Boyom =

Cameroonian footballer

Personal information
- Date of birth: 12 December 1988 (age 37)
- Place of birth: Batouri, Cameroon
- Height: 1.86 m (6 ft 1 in)
- Position: Centre back

Senior career*
Years	Team	Apps	(Gls)
2009–2010	Sable		
2012–2016	Recreativo do Libolo		
2016	AEL Limassol	0	(0)
2016–2017	Luftëtari	30	(2)
2017–2018	Al-Watani		
2018	Onze Bravos		
2019–2021	Kastrioti	33	(0)
- * Club domestic league appearances and goals

Edy-Nicolas Boyom (born 12 December 1988) is a Cameroonian former footballer who played as a defender.

Boyom began playing football with Sable FC, captaining the side during the 2009 Elite One season. Boyom played abroad in Angola with C.R.D. Libolo, and despite signing a contract to play in Portugal with Moreirense F.C. he returned to Libolo before appearing for the club.
