= Jaime Linares =

Angolan footballer (born 1982)

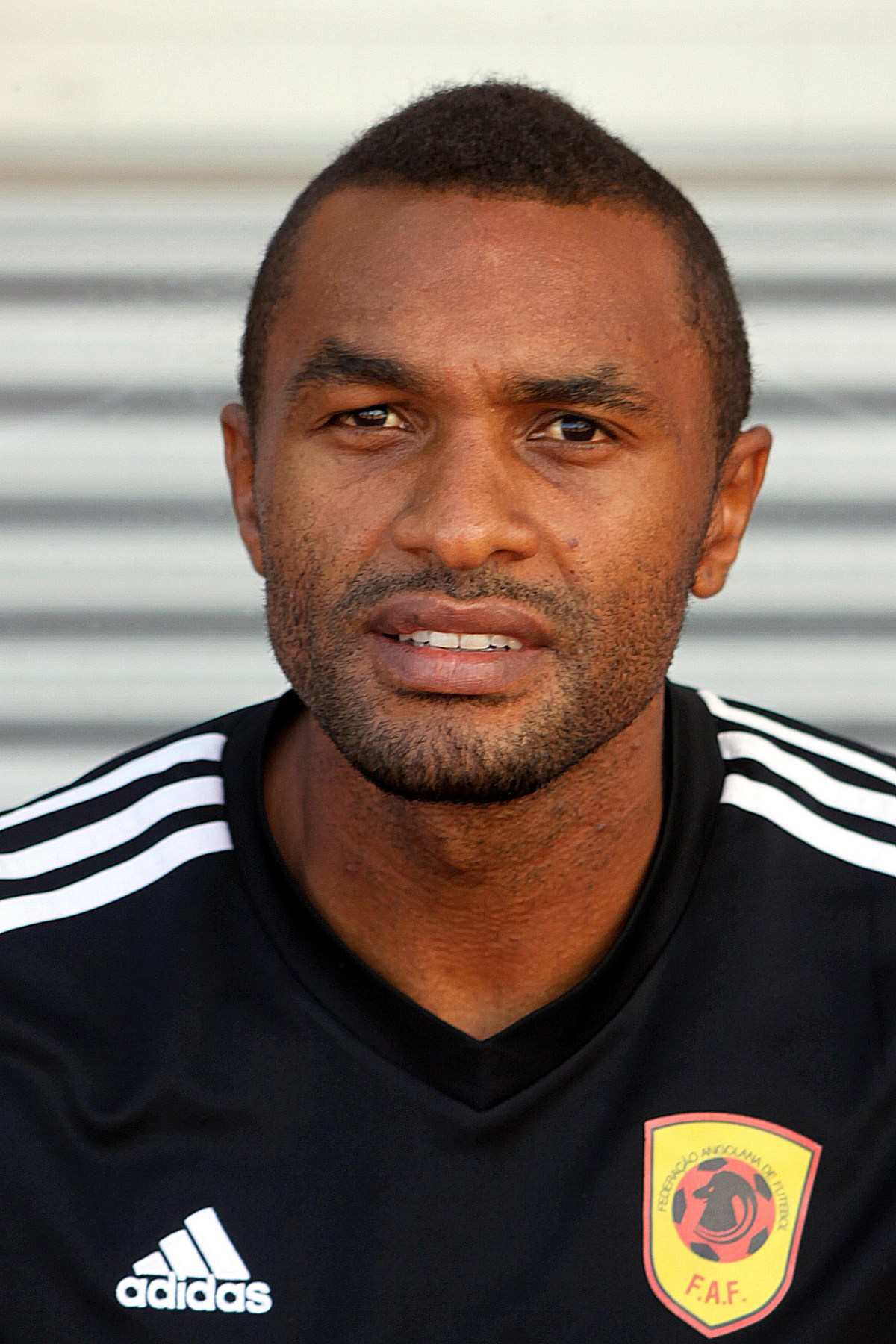
- Linares with Angola in 2014

Personal information
- Full name: Jaime Miguel Linares
- Date of birth: 21 May 1982 (age 44)
- Place of birth: Vila Real, Portugal
- Height: 1.87 m (6 ft 2 in)
- Position: Defensive midfielder

Youth career
- 1992–1996: Diogo Cão
- 1996–1998: Vila Real
- 1998–2001: Boavista

Senior career*
Years	Team	Apps	(Gls)
2001–2002	Gondomar	8	(0)
2002–2003	Leça	31	(0)
2003–2004	Lusitânia	30	(2)
2004–2005	Ovarense	28	(0)
2005–2006	Dragões Sandinenses	25	(1)
2006–2007	Ribeira Brava	26	(0)
2007–2010	Bordj Bou Arréridj	77	(3)
2011–2015	Progresso	62	(2)
2016–2019	Libolo	49	(2)
Total		336	(12)

International career
2011–2014	Angola	3	(0)
- * Club domestic league appearances and goals

Jaime Miguel Linares (born 21 May 1982) is an Angolan former professional footballer who played as a defensive midfielder.

== Club career ==
Born in Vila Real, Portugal to Angolan parents, Linares started playing football for Associação Desportiva e Cultural Escola Diogo Cão, joining S.C. Vila Real at the age of 14 and finishing his youth career with Boavista FC. He made his senior debut with another northern club, Gondomar S.C. of the third division.

In the following four seasons, Linares continued to play in the third level, but also competed in division two with Leça F.C. and A.D. Ovarense. On early morning 16 May 2005 he was involved in a traffic accident with four other players, most notably José Bosingwa and Nélson Marcos, but suffered only minor injuries.

Linares then played in the Algerian Ligue Professionnelle 1 with CA Bordj Bou Arréridj, spending three seasons with the side. Subsequently, he returned to the land of his ancestors and signed for Progresso Associação do Sambizanga.

== International career ==
Linares was part of the Angolan squad at the 2012 Africa Cup of Nations. There, on 22 January, at the age of almost 30, he made his international debut, playing the last seconds of the 2–1 group stage win against Burkina Faso.
