= Erivaldo =

Portuguese footballer (born 1994)

Personal information
- Full name: Erivaldo Jorge Paulo Ferreira
- Date of birth: 8 February 1994 (age 32)
- Place of birth: Aveiro, Portugal
- Height: 1.78 m (5 ft 10 in)
- Position: Winger

Team information
- Current team: Marco 09
- Number: 8

Youth career
- 2005–2009: Beira-Mar
- 2009–2013: Braga

Senior career*
Years	Team	Apps	(Gls)
2012–2015	Braga B	68	(7)
2014	Braga	3	(0)
2015	Feirense	21	(2)
2016	Libolo	31	(10)
2017–2018	Aves	11	(2)
2017–2018	→ Académico Viseu (loan)	11	(0)
2018–2019	Leixões	29	(2)
2019–2020	Marítimo	16	(1)
2020–2021	Beroe	21	(2)
2021	Taraz	5	(0)
2022	Leixões	17	(1)
2023	Trofense	18	(2)
2023–2024	Petro Atlético	11	(0)
2024–2025	Anadia	23	(1)
2025–	Marco 09	25	(1)

International career
2014	Portugal U20	1	(1)
- * Club domestic league appearances and goals as of 7 May 2026

Erivaldo Jorge Paulo Ferreira (born 8 February 1994), known simply as Erivaldo, is a Portuguese professional footballer who plays as a winger for Liga 3 club Marco 09. He also holds Angolan citizenship.

== Club career ==
Born in Aveiro, Erivaldo finished his formative years at S.C. Braga. He spent his first three seasons as a senior with their reserves in the Segunda Liga, scoring his first goal there on 2 November 2013 in a 2–4 home loss against S.C. Beira-Mar.

Erivaldo played his first match in the Primeira Liga with the first team on 30 March 2014, coming on as a late substitute in the 0–1 home defeat to S.L. Benfica. After his release, and save for a brief spell in the Angolan Girabola with C.R.D. Libolo, he competed in the Portuguese second division with C.D. Feirense, C.D. Aves, Académico de Viseu F.C. and Leixões SC.

Erivaldo returned to the top tier in the summer of 2019, with C.S. Marítimo. He scored his only goal in the league on 25 July 2020 to close a 3–3 home draw with F.C. Famalicão (the last matchday), his 95th-minute strike denying the opposition qualification to the UEFA Europa League.

In the following years, Erivaldo played abroad, with PFC Beroe Stara Zagora in the First Professional Football League (Bulgaria) and FC Taraz in the Kazakhstan Premier League. He rejoined Leixões on 31 January 2022.

== International career ==
Erivaldo earned one cap for Portugal at under-20 level, scoring in a 2–0 friendly win over Slovakia in Marinha Grande.
