= Brito (footballer, born 1987) =

Cape Verdean footballer

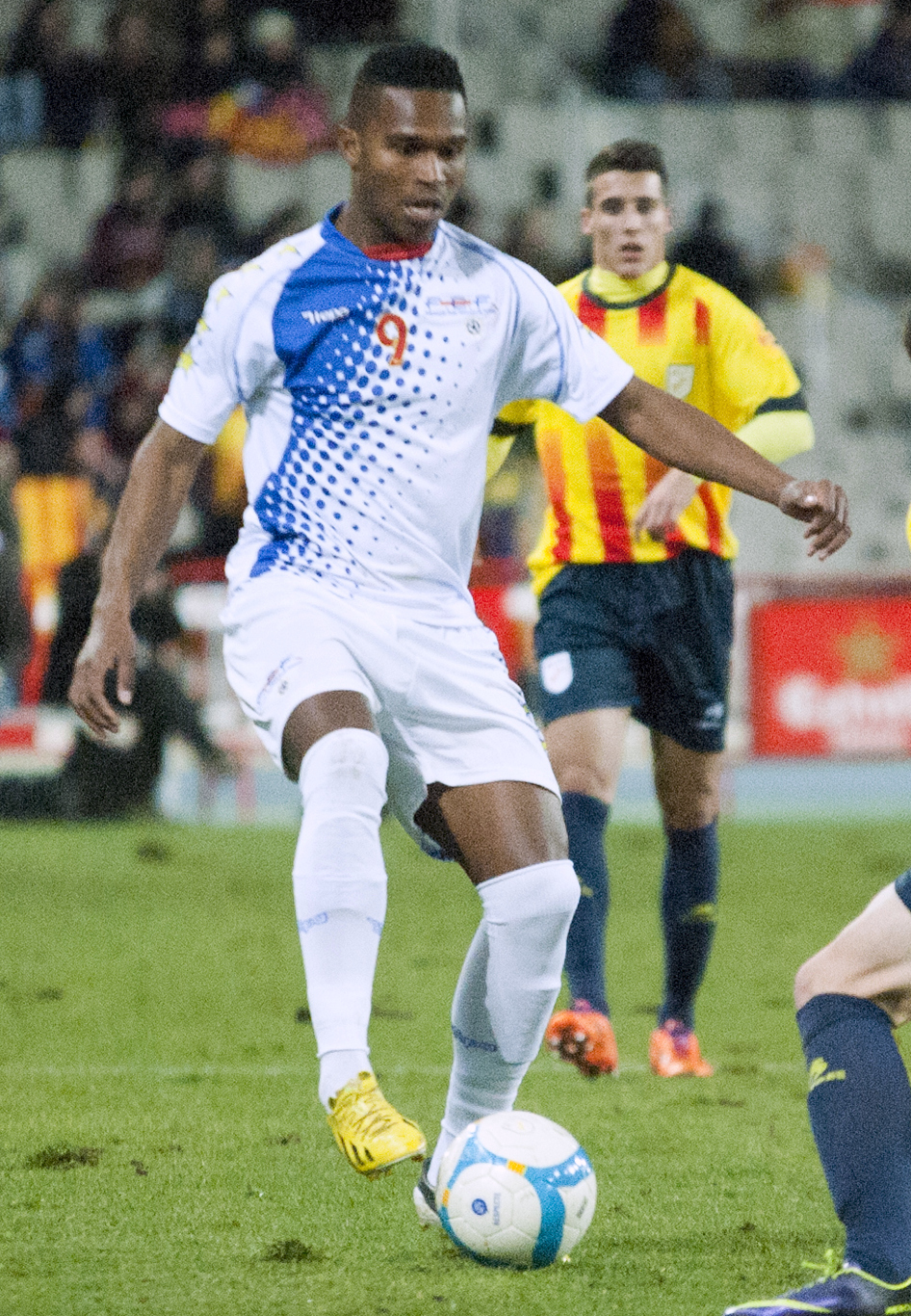

Personal information
- Full name: Armindo Rodrigues Mendes Furtado
- Date of birth: 16 November 1987 (age 38)
- Place of birth: Moita, Portugal
- Height: 1.78 m (5 ft 10 in)
- Positions: Attacking midfielder; forward

Senior career*
Years	Team	Apps	(Gls)
2006–2007	Quintajense	2	(0)
2007–2009	Barreirense	28	(7)
2009–2010	Lagoa	40	(7)
2011	Sertanense	15	(1)
2011–2012	Torreense	30	(7)
2012–2014	Gil Vicente	24	(1)
2014–2015	Boavista	27	(5)
2015–2016	Rec do Libolo	2	(0)
2016–2017	Marítimo	20	(0)
2017–2019	Xanthi	41	(5)
2019–2020	Dinamo București	4	(0)
2020	Académica	2	(0)
2020–2021	Ionikos	9	(0)
Total		243	(33)

International career
2013	Cape Verde	2	(0)
- * Club domestic league appearances and goals as of 6 March 2021

Armindo Rodrigues Mendes Furtado (born 16 November 1987), commonly known as Brito, is a professional footballer. Born in Portugal, he played for the Cape Verde national team.

== Career ==
On 18 July 2017 Super League Greece club Xanthi announced the signing of Brito. He made his debut against Lamia in 0–0 home draw on 19 August 2017. One week later he scored his first goal in 2–0 away win against Platanias. On 15 October 2017 he scored with a marvellous free-kick against AEK Athens in a 1–1 home draw. A few days later the club's administration extended his contract for 2 years. On 4 November he scored a brace in a 3–1 away win against Panetolikos.

His first goal for the 2018–19 season came in a home game against PAS Giannina, which ended as a 2–1 win.

On 30 June 2019 Brito signed a contract with Romania's club, Dinamo București. He was released on 30 January 2020.
