= Julsy Boukama-Kaya =

Congolese footballer

Personal information
- Full name: Julsy Gitel Hermelin Boukama-Kaya
- Date of birth: 5 February 1993 (age 33)
- Place of birth: Congo
- Height: 1.67 m (5 ft 6 in)
- Position: Midfielder

Team information
- Current team: C.R.D. Libolo
- Number: 23

Senior career*
Years	Team	Apps	(Gls)
2010–2011	CSM Diables Noirs		
2011–2013	Coton Sport		
2014–	C.R.D. Libolo		

International career^{‡}
2010–	Congo	9	(0)
- * Club domestic league appearances and goals as of 14:37, 18 September 2015 (UTC) ‡ National team caps and goals as of 14:27, 18 September 2015 (UTC)

Julsy Gitel Hermelin Boukama-Kaya (born 5 February 1993) is a Congolese professional footballer who plays for Angolan club C.R.D. Libolo and the Congo national team.

== Honours ==
Coton Sport

Winner

- Elite One: 2013

Runner-up

- Elite One: 2011–2012

C.R.D. Libolo

Winner

- Girabola: 2014
