= Wíres (footballer) =

Brazilian footballer

Personal information
- Full name: Wíres José de Souza
- Date of birth: 30 December 1982 (age 43)
- Place of birth: Vitória de Santo Antão, Brazil
- Height: 1.78 m (5 ft 10 in)
- Position: Defensive midfielder

Senior career*
Years	Team	Apps	(Gls)
2003–2006	Vitória-PE		
2007–2008	Vera Cruz		
2007	→ Guarany-PE (loan)		
2008–2013	Rio Ave	117	(5)
2013–2016	Recreativo do Libolo	51	(3)
2017	Grêmio Anápolis	10	(0)
2018–2021	Vitória das Tabocas	34	(0)

Managerial career
- 2022: Grêmio Anápolis (assistant)
- 2022: Grêmio Anápolis (interim)
- 2022: Tupynambás (assistant)
- 2022: Tupynambás (interim)
- 2022: Chã Grande (assistant)
- 2022: Chã Grande (interim)
- 2023–2025: Retrô U20
- 2025: Retrô (interim)
- 2025: Retrô
- * Club domestic league appearances and goals

Wíres José de Souza (born 30 December 1982), simply known as Wíres, is a Brazilian football coach and former player who played as a defensive midfielder.
