= Eddie Afonso =

Angolan footballer (born 1994)

Personal information
- Full name: Eddie Marcos Melo Afonso
- Date of birth: 7 March 1994 (age 32)
- Place of birth: Luanda, Angola
- Height: 1.77 m (5 ft 10 in)
- Position: Left-back

Team information
- Current team: Petro de Luanda
- Number: 25

Senior career*
Years	Team	Apps	(Gls)
2013	Petro de Luanda	5	(0)
2014–2017	Rec do Libolo	64	(1)
2018–	Petro de Luanda	107	(2)

International career^{‡}
2016–	Angola	27	(0)
- * Club domestic league appearances and goals as of 25 May 2019 ‡ National team caps and goals as of 7 September 2023

Eddie Marcos Melo Afonso (born 7 March 1994) is an Angolan footballer who plays as a left-back for Petro de Luanda and the Angola national team.

== International career ==
Afonso made his senior international debut on 17 January 2016 in a 1–0 home loss against Cameroon for the Africa Nations Championship.

On 3 December 2025, Afonso was called up to the Angola squad for the 2025 Africa Cup of Nations.
