= Estádio Municipal de Calulo =

Multi-use stadium in Calulo, Angola

Coordinates: 10°0′23.8788″S 14°54′18.3852″E

Estadio Municipal de Calulo
- Interactive map of Estadio Municipal de Calulo
- Location: Calulo, Angola
- Owner: C.R.D. Libolo
- Capacity: 5,000 (2016)

Construction
- Renovated: 17 February 2008; 18 years ago

Tenant
- C.R.D. Libolo

Estadio Municipal de Calulo is a multi-use stadium in Calulo, Angola. It is primarily used for football and serves as the home ground for C.R.D. Libolo of the Girabola. The stadium holds 5,000 spectators.

Built in the colonial period, the stadium was renovated and reinaugurated on 17 February 2008 with a match between Recreativo do Libolo and Corinthians of Brazil.

The stadium originally known as Campo de Calulo was renamed in 1975 as Estádio Patrice Lumumba. In 1978, it was renamed to its current denomination.
