= Calulo =

- Commune and town
- Location in Angola
- Coordinates: 10°0′2.4336″S 14°54′3.528″E
- Country: Angola
- Province: Cuanza Sul
- Municipality: Libolo

Area
  - Total: 680 sq mi (1,750 km^{2})
- Elevation: 3,250 ft (990 m)

Population (2014)
  - Total: 60,709
  - Density: 89.8/sq mi (34.7/km^{2})
- Time zone: UTC+1 (WAT)
- Website: https://www.kalulo.com

Calulo [kɐˈlulu] is a town, with a population of 44,000 (2014), and a commune in the municipality of Libolo, province of Cuanza Sul, Angola and the seat of the municipality. The town stands at an altitude of 990 m (3,250 ft) above sea level.

Calulo is the hometown of the popular football team Clube Recreativo Desportivo do Libolo.

== See also ==
- Estádio Municipal de Calulo
