= Mamadou Diawara =

French footballer (born 1989)

Personal information
- Full name: Mamadou Lamine Diawara
- Date of birth: 26 July 1989 (age 37)
- Place of birth: Clermont-Ferrand, France
- Height: 1.92 m (6 ft 4 in)
- Position: Forward

Youth career
- 2007–2009: Clermont B

Senior career*
| Years | Team | Apps | (Gls) |
| 2009–2011 | Clermont B | 6 | (1) |
| 2011–2012 | Akritas Chloraka | 21 | (4) |
| 2012–2014 | Belenenses | 43 | (5) |
| 2014–2017 | Rec do Libolo | | |
| 2018 | Bravos do Maquis | | |
| 2018–2020 | Muaither | 35 | (16) |
| 2020–2022 | Mesaimeer | 22 | (13) |
| 2022 | Al-Markhiya | 6 | (3) |
- * Club domestic league appearances and goals as of 19 March 2023

Mamadou Diawara (born 26 July 1989) is a French professional footballer who plays as a forward.

== Career ==
A product of Clermont Foot youth academy, he joined the Portuguese team Belenenses in 2012 on a free transfer.

== Personal life ==
Born in France, Diawara is of Guinean and Senegalese descent.
