= Coqueiros Stadium =

Sports venue in Luanda, Angola

Coordinates: 8°48′51.4548″S 13°13′33.6504″E

Estádio Municipal dos Coqueiros
- Location: Luanda, Angola
- Owner: State
- Capacity: 12,000

Construction
- Opened: 1947; 79 years ago
- Renovated: 17 July 2005; 21 years ago

Tenant
- Kabuscorp

Estádio dos Coqueiros is a multi-use stadium in Luanda, Angola. It is currently used mostly for football matches and is the home ground of Benfica de Luanda and Kabuscorp. The stadium holds 12,000 people and was built during the colonial period, in 1947. It underwent major renovation works in 2005.
