= Dany Satonho =

Angolan footballer (born 1990)

Dany
Personal information
- Full name: Silas Daniel Satonho
- Date of birth: 14 January 1990 (age 36)
- Place of birth: Angola
- Height: 1.66 m (5 ft 5 in)
- Position: Central midfielder

Senior career*
Years	Team	Apps	(Gls)
2009–2013	Petro de Luanda		
2014–2016	CR D Libolo		
2016–2017	Luftëtari	15	(0)
2018–2019	Interclube	31	(1)
2019–2020	Kabuscorp	9	(2)
2020–2022	Petro de Luanda	50	(6)

International career
2016–2019	Angola	3	(0)
- * Club domestic league appearances and goals

Silas Daniel Satonho best known as Dany (born 14 January 1990) is an Angolan former footballer who played as a midfielder. He is also a member of the Angola national team.

In 2019, he transferred from Interclube to Kabuscorp in midseason.

In 2019–20, he signed in for Petro de Luanda in the Angolan league, the Girabola.

== External ==
- Dany Satonho at Soccerway
- Dany Satonho at National-Football-Teams.com
