= Sidnei (Cape Verdean footballer) =

Cape Verdean footballer

Personal information
- Full name: Sidnei dos Reis Mariano
- Date of birth: 23 February 1986 (age 40)
- Place of birth: Praia, Cape Verde
- Height: 1.74 m (5 ft 9 in)
- Position: Central midfielder

Team information
- Current team: Libolo
- Number: 8

Senior career*
Years	Team	Apps	(Gls)
2006–2011	Marítimo	16	(1)
2006–2011	Marítimo B	76	(8)
2009–2010	→ Beira-Mar (loan)	6	(0)
2011–2013	Gil Vicente	1	(0)
2012	→ Libolo (loan)	25	(1)
2013–	Libolo	43	(4)

International career^{‡}
2009–	Cape Verde	8	(0)
- * Club domestic league appearances and goals as of 17:45, 12 June 2015 (UTC) ‡ National team caps and goals as of 17:45, 12 June 2015 (UTC)

Sidnei dos Reis Mariano (born 23 February 1986), known as Sidnei, is a Cape Verdean professional footballer who plays for Libolo in Angola, as a central midfielder.

== Football career ==
Born in Praia, Sidnei made his professional debut in 2008 with Maritimo.

He made his international debut for Cape Verde in 2009.
