= Carlitos (footballer, born 1988) =

Portuguese-born Angolan footballer

Personal information
- Full name: Carlos Miguel Gomes de Almeida
- Date of birth: 24 September 1988 (age 38)
- Place of birth: Vale de Cambra, Portugal
- Height: 1.83 m (6 ft 0 in)
- Positions: Right-back; winger

Team information
- Current team: Águeda

Youth career
- 2001–2007: Oliveirense

Senior career*
Years	Team	Apps	(Gls)
2007–2009	Oliveirense	36	(3)
2009–2011	Paços Ferreira	16	(0)
2010–2011	→ Oliveirense (loan)	18	(1)
2011–2017	Libolo	77	(0)
2018	Bravos Maquis	10	(0)
2018–2019	Interclube	13	(0)
2019–2020	Olhanense	21	(0)
2020–2021	Alverca	13	(1)
2021–2022	Olhanense	22	(1)
2022–2023	Beira-Mar	23	(0)
2023–2024	São João Ver	17	(0)
2024–	Águeda	60	(1)

International career
2012–2015	Angola	4	(0)
- * Club domestic league appearances and goals as of 20:12, 7 October 2026 (UTC)

Carlos Miguel Gomes de Almeida (born 24 September 1988), known as Carlitos, is an Angolan professional footballer who plays as a right-back or a right winger for Portuguese club R.D. Águeda.

== Club career ==
Born in Vale de Cambra, Aveiro District of Angolan descent, Carlitos joined U.D. Oliveirense's youth academy at the age of 13. He went on to represent the senior side in both the third and second divisions, his first match in the latter competition occurring on 21 September 2008 in a 1–2 home loss against S.C. Covilhã and his first goal coming exactly three months later, as the hosts defeated S.C. Freamunde by the same score.

In the 2009 off-season, Carlitos signed a four-year contract with Primeira Liga club F.C. Paços de Ferreira. His maiden league appearance took place on 16 August, in a 1–1 home draw with FC Porto. The previous week, he had also come from the bench in the 2–0 loss against the same opposition in the Supertaça Cândido de Oliveira.

In the summer of 2010, Carlitos was loaned to his former team Oliveirense. He subsequently took his game to the Angolan Girabola, where he represented C.R.D. Libolo, F.C. Bravos do Maquis and G.D. Interclube, being reconverted to a right-back in the process.
