= Landú =

Angolan footballer

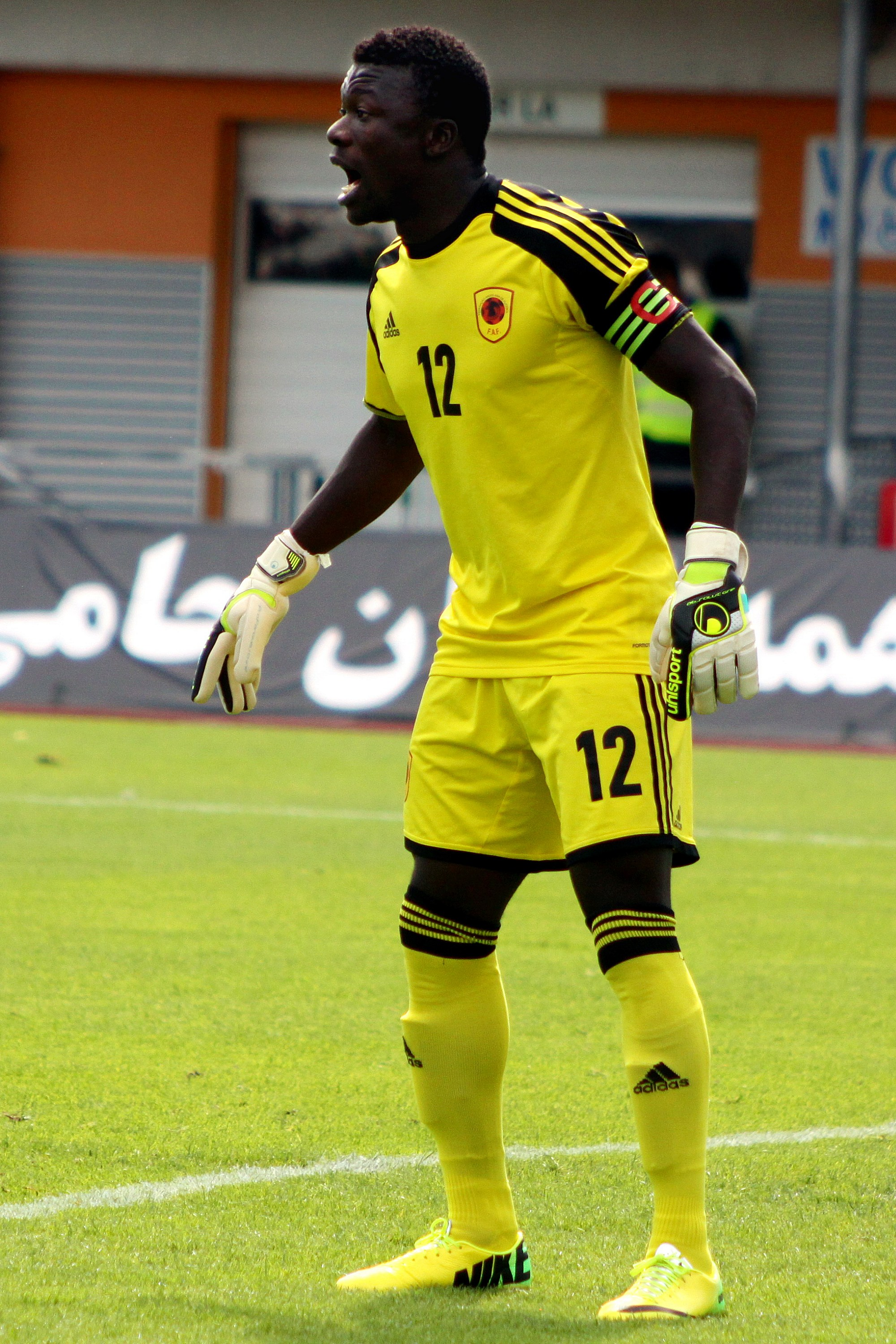

Personal information
- Full name: Landú Mavanga
- Date of birth: 4 January 1990 (age 36)
- Place of birth: Luanda, Angola
- Height: 1.78 m (5 ft 10 in)
- Position: Goalkeeper

Team information
- Current team: Kabuscorp
- Number: 22

Senior career*
Years	Team	Apps	(Gls)
2008	Baixa de Cassange		
2009–2011	Académica do Soyo		
2011–2017	Recreativo do Libolo	81	(0)
2018–2019	Interclube	44	(0)
2019–2020	Bravos do Maquis	14	(0)
2020–2022	AS Vita Club	0	(0)
2022–2023	Bravos do Maquis	12	(0)
2023–	Kabuscorp	9	(0)

International career^{‡}
2012–	Angola	36	(0)
- * Club domestic league appearances and goals as of 22 March 2024 ‡ National team caps and goals as of 22 March 2024

Landú Mavanga (born 4 January 1990) is an Angolan footballer who plays as a goalkeeper for AS Vita Club.

In 2019–20, he signed in for FC Bravos do Maquis in the Angolan league, the Girabola.

In 2020–21, he signed in for AS Vita Club in the Angolan league, the Girabola.
