= List of G.D. Interclube players =

This article is a list of G.D. Interclube players. G.D. Interclube is an Angolan football (soccer) club based in Luanda, Angola and plays at Estádio 22 de Junho. The club was established in 1976.

== 2020–2021 ==
G.D. Interclube players 2020–2021

Nat	#	Nick	Name	A	P	I.C.	Total Apps & Gls		
Nat	#	Nick	Name	A	P	2021	Total Apps & Gls		
Nat	#	Nick	Name	A	P	^{C}	^{S}	^{A}	^{G}
(Angola)	5	Abdul	António Nzayinawo	27	DF	2021			
(Angola)	26	Balsa	Carlos Augusto Manuel Balsa	21	DF	2021			
(Angola)	–	Calebi	Calebi Mateta Yanda	22	MF	2021			
(Angola)	7	Dasfaa	Garcia Salvador Vieira	29	MF	2021			
(Angola)	29	Domingos Andrade	Domingos Paulo Andrade	18	MF	2021			
(Angola)	32	Enoque Guilherme	Enoque Paulo Guilherme	34	FW	2021			
(Angola)	17	Filipe Malanda	Filipe João Malanda	28	DF	2021			
(Angola)	18	Gazeta Maienga	Pedro Malunduma Maienga	29	MF	2021			
(Angola)	12	Gelson Mangala	Francisco Pedro Mangala	22	GK	2021			
(Angola)	33	Gui Cungulo	Eufrânio Carlos da Silva Cungulo	25	MF	2021			
(Angola)	10	Higino Julião	Ezequiel Paulo Julião	27	FW	2021			
(Angola)	19	Jamanta	Edivaldo Neves Cubo Quinanga	22	MF	2021			
(Angola)	27	Jaredi	Jaredi Lopes Teixeira	23	FW	2021			
(Republic of the Congo)	8	Kaya	Julsy Gitel Hermelin Boukama-Kaya	28	MF	2021			
(Angola)	27	Leonel Correia	Leonel Mesquita da C. Correia		FW	2021			
(Angola)	3	Lito				2021			
(Angola)	15	Mano Calesso	Luís Calesso Ginga	32	MF	2021			
(Angola)	31	Matú	Alfredo Pinto	20	DF	2021			
(Democratic Republic of the Congo)	20	Modeste	Modeste Osaka Ngelenda	23	FW	2021			
(Angola)	6	Nandinho Quissanga	Fernando Jacinto Quissanga	23	MF	2021			
(Angola)	22	Ndulo Simão	Cristóvão Segunda Palanga Simão	25	GK	2021			
(Angola)	16	Nelito Tavares	Nelione José Tavares	33	FW	2021			
(Angola)	21	Panilson	Feliciano Felisberto Javela	32	DF	2021			
(Angola)	14	Paty	António Sapalo Lohoca Justo	31	MF	2021			
(Angola)	25	Pirolito Panzo	Ilídio José Panzo	28	MF	2021			
(Angola)	24	Quinito Balanga	Joaquim Marcos Cunga Balanga	23	DF	2021			
(Angola)	13	Razão	Domingos José Razão Alexandre	23	DF	2021			
(Angola)	1	Rui Miguel	Jorge Honésimo Miguel	25	GK	2021			
(Ivory Coast)	9	Wilfried	N'Guessan Wilfried Kisito Yessoh	29	FW	2021			
(Angola)	–	Zé Panzo	José Panzo Afonso	23	DF	2021			
Years						2021			

== 2011–2020 ==
G.D. Interclube players 2011–2020

Nat	Nick	Name	A	P	A.C.	B.P.	B.P.	I.I.	V.V.	Z.L.	Paulo Torres						Bruno Ribeiro			Ivo Campos			Total Apps & Gls			
Nat	Nick	Name	A	P	2011	2012	2013	2014	2015	2016	2017 (6th)			2018 (3rd)			2018–19 (5th)			2019–20			Total Apps & Gls			
Nat	Nick	Name	A	P	4	5	7	9	5	7	^{#}	^{A}	^{G}	^{#}	^{A}	^{G}	^{#}	^{A}	^{G}	^{#}	^{A}	^{G}	^{S}	^{A}	^{G}	
(Angola)	Abdoul Barri	Abdoul Maliki da Conceição Barri	18	MF													→			26	^{1(1)}	^{0}				
(Angola)	Abdul Nzayinawo	António Nzayinawo	26	DF										→			5	^{26(1)}	^{0}	5	^{21}	^{0}				
(Cameroon)	Abianda	Yann Junior Abianda	22	FW						27																
(Angola)	Ady Paulo	Agostinho Domingos Paulo	27	MF						→	6	^{4(2)}	^{0}	→												
(Angola)	Aguinaldo Veiga	Aguinaldo Policarpo Mendes da Veiga	26	FW					29																	
(Cape Verde)	Alex Fernandes	Aires Sulivandro Marques Fernandes	28	MF	10	2012	10	10	→																	
(Angola)	António Sapalo	Tomás Chilombo Cambuque Sapalo	20	DF					22	13				→												
(Angola)	Avozinho	Domingos Ferraz		GK			–	–																		
(Angola)	Baby	Valdemar Denso António	26	MF						→	10	^{13(7)}	^{1}	10	^{2(5)}	^{0}										
(Angola)	Baca	Leonardo Muanza Baca		DF							5	^{19}	^{0}	5	^{11}	^{1}										
(Angola)	Balsa	Carlos Augusto Manuel Balsa	20	DF																31	^{2(1)}	^{0}				
(Senegal)	Baptiste Faye	Jen Baptiste Faye	26	FW		2012	–	→																		
(Angola)	Barese	Afonso Pedro				2012																				
(Angola)	Bartolo	Bartolomeu Baptista Teng	21	MF						3	→															
(Angola)	Bebé	Odimir Abreu Gabriel Breganha	30	MF	→	2012	6	6	6	6																
(Senegal)	Ben Traoré	Naman Traoré	32	FW													→			19	^{1(7)}	^{2}				
(Angola)	Benvindo Regresso	Benvindo Regresso Pontes Garcia	30	MF	25																					
(Angola)	Bryan Nunes	Bryan David Cruz Ferreira Nunes	24	MF		2012																				
(Angola)	Cabibi Abreu	Mário Rui de Abreu	23	MF			→	18	→																	
(Angola)	Cachi	Januário da Cruz Sesa		MF			–			7	→															
(Angola)	Calebi	Calebi Mateta Yanda	20	MF							8	^{3(3)}	^{1}	8	^{1(4)}	^{0}	8	^{DNP}		→						
(Angola)	Capuco	Emanuel José Paulo João	25	MF	29	→																				
(Angola)	Caranga	Jorge Mendes Corte-Real Carneiro	26	MF				→	18	18	11	^{9(9)}	^{1}	11	^{12(1)}	^{0}	→									
(Angola)	Carlinhos do Carmo	Carlos Stelvio F. Guimarães do Carmo	25	MF													→			10	^{14(7)}	^{4}				→
(Angola)	Carlitos Almeida	Carlos Miguel Gomes de Almeida	31	DF										28	^{13}	^{0}	28	^{28(1)}	^{1}							
(Guinea-Bissau)	Carvalho	Basile Salomon Pereira de Carvalho	34	FW				→	9																	
(Angola)	Castro Cuambi	Manuel de Castro Masiala Cuambi	27	MF	→	2012	26	26																		
(Republic of the Congo)	Chabo	Daile Odile Chabo Ombion	28	MF							27	^{1(2)}	^{0}													
(Angola)	Chico Bunga	Carlos Francisco Diassonama Panzo Bunga	26	MF					→	29	29	^{7(2)}	^{1}	→												
(Angola)	Chico Caputo	Francisco Eduardo Gomes Caputo	30	DF			→	13	13	→																
(Angola)	Chiló Orlando	Francisco Ananias Orlando	27	MF						→	9	^{1(5)}	^{0}													
(Angola)	Chonene	João Augusto Afonso	24	DF						→	13	^{8(1)}	^{1}	2	^{12}	^{0}	→									
(Angola)	Chora Ginga	Fernando Quitanda Ginga	29	DF						6																
(Republic of the Congo)	Christ	Christ Ngoma Mbo	26	DF						24																
(Angola)	Coxe	Adão Jaime Cassule	21	FW													→			23	^{11(4)}	^{2}				
(Angola)	Cristiano Quitembo	Cristiano Bernardo Quitembo	28	DF				23	23	23	→															
(Angola)	Daniel Lara	Daniel da Costa Lara	25	DF	→	2012																				
(Cameroon)	Daniel Nkotto	Jean Daniel Nkotto Mikande	18	MF	16																					
(Cape Verde)	Dany Ribeiro	Daniel Mendes Ribeiro	25	FW		2012	7																			
(Angola)	Dany Satonho	Silas Daniel Satonho	30	MF							→			9	^{22(5)}	^{1}	9	^{5(6)}	^{0}							
(Angola)	Dasfaa	Garcia Salvador Vieira	28	MF				–	15	15	7	^{14(4)}	^{3}	7	^{5(5)}	^{1}	7	^{30}	^{8}	7	^{10(8)}	^{2}				
(Democratic Republic of the Congo)	Dax Kiakanda	Dadi Kitondo Kiakanda	29	MF						10																
(Angola)	Day Day	Zaldivar Doval Augusto Cambinda	25	DF		→	–	7	7	→																
(Angola)	Debaile	José Felix Pacavira de Carvalho					–																			
(Angola)	Denny	Denny Filipe Palege Escorcio		FW										24	^{3(1)}	^{0}										
(Angola)	Diangi	Diangi Reagan Kisiavo Matusiwa	30	FW				→	26																	
(Angola)	Dias Caires	Yahenda Joaquim Caires Fernandes	33	DF	–																					
(Democratic Republic of the Congo)	Dicha	Dicha Bomanyae Liema	31	FW										→			23	^{6(5)}	^{1}							
(Angola)	Die	Bulay João Domingos Kiala	21	GK			→	23			→															
(Angola)	Dilman	Dilman Edvair Furtado Ribeiro	18	MF					16	→																
(Angola)	Djemba Bunga	Gildo Paulo Bunga		MF				21	21	→																
(Brazil)	Donato	João Vitor Souza Donato	24	DF													→			13	^{1}	^{0}				→
(Portugal)	Duarte	Duarte Jorge Gomes Duarte	30	MF						→	27	^{6(1)}	^{3}													
(Cape Verde)	Edson Cruz	Edson Jorge Lopes Cruz	23	MF	6	→																				
(Angola)	Edson Silva	Edson Jesus Silva	27	DF													16	^{6}	^{0}							
(Angola)	Élio	Élio Wilson Costa Martins	27	MF			25	25																		
(Angola)	Elton	Elton Ernesto Carvalho	25	FW										→			21	^{3(3)}	^{0}							
(Angola)	Enoque	Enoque Paulo Guilherme	–	FW													34	^{2(4)}	^{1}	30	^{DNP}					
(Angola)	Estória	Sérgio António Luís	26	DF						13																
(Angola)	Fabrício Mafuta	Fabrício Mafuta	30	DF	4	2012	–	4	4	4	4	^{23}	^{3}	4	^{25}	^{1}	→									
(Angola)	Filipe Malanda	Filipe João Malanda	27	DF			35	17	17	17	17	^{21}	^{0}	17	^{3(1)}	^{0}	17	^{20(3)}	^{1}	17	^{14(1)}	^{0}				
(Angola)	Fissy	Alberto Álvaro Paca	28	DF	5	2012	→																			
(Angola)	Gelson Mangala	Francisco Pedro Mangala	21	GK													12	^{(1)}	^{0}	12	^{14}	^{0}				
(Angola)	Gláucio Bicuila	Gláucio Victor Bicuila		FW										→			16	^{3(2)}	^{1}							
(Angola)	Hernâni	Hernâni das Neves Tomás	33	DF	2	2012																				
(Guinea-Bissau)	Ibraime	Ibraime Barreto Cassamá	29	MF				→	5	→																
(Angola)	Ito	Mário Manuel de Oliveira	25	MF							→			6	^{20(1)}	^{0}	6	^{19(2)}	^{1}	6	^{19(1)}	^{0}				→
(Democratic Republic of the Congo)	Itubu	Itubu Imbem	32	FW													19	^{1(3)}	^{0}							
(Angola)	Jaime Poulson	Jaime Filipe Machado Poulson	27	FW					→	28	→															
(Angola)	Jaredi	Jaredi Lopes Teixeira	22	FW													→			27	^{12(9)}	^{3}				
(Angola)	Jó Vidal	Mariano da Costa Vidal	23	DF										30	^{8}	^{0}	→									
(Angola)	João Ngongo	João Baptista Ngongo	27	GK													→			22	^{11}	^{0}				
(Angola)	Joãozinho Machado	João Artur Machado	30	DF	17	→																				
(Angola)	Joel Esteves	Joel Pedro Mpongo Esteves	36	DF	20	2012																				
(Angola)	Jojó Mendes	Humberto Jorge Graça Mendes	21	MF	28																					
(Angola)	Jorginho Correia	Jorge Bernardo Correia	21	MF										27	^{(1)}	^{0}	27	^{1(4)}	^{1}	→						
(Angola)	Jotabé Silva	João Baptista da Silva	30	GK				→	1	1	1	^{1}	^{0}	→												
(Angola)	Jussane	Jussane da Costa Marques Ribeiro	21	FW	19																					
(Angola)	Kadima	Efraim do Rosário Sabi Kadima	20	FW																9	^{2(4)}	^{2}				→
(Angola)	Kaporal	João Chingando Manha	25	FW							→			3	^{5(17)}	^{6}	3	^{6(6)}	^{0}	→						
(Republic of the Congo)	Kaya	Julsy Gitel Hermelin Boukama-Kaya	27	MF													→			8	^{20(1)}	^{3}				
(Angola)	Kembua	Nkembo Garcia	28	FW				28	28																	
(Angola)	Kialunda	João Vienga Kialenda	27	DF	→	2012	30	→																		
(Angola)	Kibeixa	Pedro Victor Mingas	23	MF						30	→															
(Angola)	Kiloy	Junqueira Jacinto Dala	23	MF						→	26	^{2(8)}	^{1}	→												
(Angola)	Kito Rocha	Francisco Domingos da Rocha	30	DF	3	2012	–	3	3																	
(Angola)	Landu	Landu Mavanga	29	GK							→			22	^{27}	^{0}	22	^{29}	^{0}	→						
(Angola)	Langanga	Landu Langanga	23	GK										→			1	^{DNP}								
(Angola)	Laúcha	Ivan Cláudio França Joanes		MF				–																		
(Angola)	Laurentino	Laurentino Gerónimo Fernandes da Cruz	34	GK	22	→																				
(Angola)	Lindala	Armando Domingos Maria	31	MF						→	18	^{14(6)}	^{1}	18	^{(3)}	^{0}										
(Angola)	Loló Cassule	Jorge Miguel Gonçalves Cassule	25	DF			→	30	–	→																
(Democratic Republic of the Congo)	Lomalisa	Joyce Lomalisa Mutambala	27	DF										→			2	^{19(2)}	^{1}	2	^{14(3)}	^{0}				→
(Angola)	Love Andrade	João Love Andrade		FW			–																			
(Democratic Republic of the Congo)	Lucas			FW													29	^{3(6)}	^{0}							
(Angola)	Lúcio																			32	^{DNP}					
(Angola)	Luís Cláudio	Luís Cláudio Sebastião de Melo	28	MF	→	2012																				
(Angola)	Mabululu	Agostinho Cristóvão Paciência	24	FW					→	9	→															
(Angola)	Malungo			FW				16																		
(Angola)	Mandinho	Oliveira Francisco Soares	21	DF										26	^{10(1)}	^{0}	26	^{4}	^{0}	→						
(Angola)	Mano Calesso	Luís Calesso Ginga	31	MF						→	15	^{22(2)}	^{6}	15	^{27}	^{10}	15	^{24}	^{2}	15	^{19(3)}	^{5}				
(Angola)	Manú	Manuel Júlio Famorosa Vunge	26														32	^{2}	^{0}	→						
(Angola)	Manucho Barros	João Hernani Rosa Barros	27	FW	24	2012	24	→																		
(Angola)	Marcos										–	^{(1)}	^{0}													
(Portugal)	Marinho	Mário Jorge Ferreira da Silva	31	DF			→	23	→																	
(Angola)	Mário Hipólito	Mário Damião Hipólito	28	GK	12	2012	–																			
(Angola)	Massinga	Moisés Armando Yango	25	FW	→	2012	→																			
(Angola)	Mateus Domingos	Mateus Gaspar Domingos	27	MF													→			18	^{6(3)}	^{1}				
(Angola)	Matú	Alfredo Pinto		DF													31	^{1(1)}	^{0}							
(Portugal)	Mauro	Mauro Alexandre da Silva Almeida	29	DF	–	→																				
(Angola)	Mayamba										21	^{1(1)}	^{0}													
(Angola)	Meda Nsiandamba	Vidal Miguel Nsiandamba	22	MF		→	11	11	→																	
(Angola)	Mendinho Tavares	Walter Moura Mendes Tavares	23	MF	→	2012	→																			
(Cameroon)	Messi, Georges	Georges Parfait Mbida Messi	32	MF	18	2012																				
(Angola)	Messi Zangui	Sebastião Malungo Zangui	23	MF	–	2012		33																		
(Cameroon)	Mfede	Anthony Kevin Mfede Junior	22	MF						21																
(Angola)	Miguel Quiame	Miguel Geraldo Quiame	26	DF						→	21	^{7}	^{0}	→												
(Angola)	Minguito Fernandes	Domingos dos Santos Fernandes	29	MF	15	2012	→																			
(Angola)	Mira Macuenho	Daniel João Zongo Macuenho	29	DF													→			28	^{20}	^{0}				→
(Angola)	Moco	Bruno Baptista Tolombua Fernando	27	FW	–	2012	19	19	19	19	19	^{8(5)}	^{1}	19	^{6(8)}	^{1}	→									
(Democratic Republic of the Congo)	Modeste	Modeste Osaka Ngelenda	22	FW													11	^{12(4)}	^{0}	11	^{10(2)}	^{1}				
(Cameroon)	Mvom	Ghislain Rodrigue Mvom-Mbeyo’o	24	DF						5																
(Cameroon)	Namatchoua	Frank Ivan Namatchoua à Bidias	26	FW				29	–																	
(Angola)	Nandinho Macamo	Wilson Fernandes Augusto Macamo	30	MF				→	–	24																
(Angola)	Nari	Bráulio Adélio de Olim Diniz	25	MF	11	2012	→																			
(Angola)	Neblú	Adilson Cipriano da Cruz	24	GK						22	22	^{20}	^{0}	→												
(Angola)	Nelson Antunes	Nelson Francisco Manuel Lobo Antunes	25	GK				–	12	12	12	^{3}	^{0}	→												
(Angola)	Nuno Cadete	Gerson Agostinho Sebastião Cadete	32	GK			→	1	27																	
(Portugal)	Nuno Fonseca	Nuno Miguel de Magalhães Fonseca	34	MF	7																					
(Angola)	Nuno Neto	Nuno Miguel de Menezes Neto	30	DF	→	2012	8	→																		
(Angola)	Nzau	Nzau Miguel Lutumba	28	DF										→			13	^{2(1)}	^{0}	→						
(Angola)	Panilson	Feliciano Felisberto Javela	31	DF													→			21	^{12}	^{0}				
(Democratic Republic of the Congo)	Patrick Anfumu	Patrick Lembo Anfumu	25	FW	27	→																				
(Angola)	Paty	António Sapalo Lohoca Justo	30	MF	14	2012	14	14	14	14	14	^{18(2)}	^{1}	14	^{24}	^{0}	14	^{24(2)}	^{4}	14	^{12(9)}	^{6}				
(Angola)	Paulo																			33	^{(1)}	^{0}				
(Angola)	Paz	Manuel Nhanga Zundo	29	MF				→	11	11	→															
(Angola)	Pedrito Marques	Pedro Alexandre Mendes Marques	27	MF				→	10	→																
(Angola)	Pedro	Pedro Simão Kiaku	22	DF																3	^{3}	^{0}				
(Angola)	Pedro Bengui	Pedro Bengui	26	FW							→			29	^{18(8)}	^{7}	11	^{1(1)}	^{0}							
(Angola)	Pedro Henriques	Pedro Manuel Henriques Dias	33	FW	9	→																				
(Angola)	Pedy	Benedito C. Dumbo		FW													→			16	^{4(1)}	^{1}				
(Angola)	Pingo	Mateus João Francisco Bravo	30	DF	13	2012	13	→																		
(Angola)	Pirolito	Ilídio José Panzo	26	MF	–	2012	–	34	25	25	25	^{15(1)}	^{0}	25	^{3(3)}	^{0}	25	^{11(5)}	^{2}	→						
(Angola)	Pitchou				–																					
(Angola)	Quinito Balanga	Joaquim Marcos Cunga Balanga	22	DF										→			24	^{9(4)}	^{0}	24	^{20(1)}	^{3}				
(Angola)	René	Kalemba René Baltazar	25	DF							→			13	^{15}	^{0}	→									
(Ghana)	Richard	Richard Arthur	24	FW							30	^{4(4)}	^{4}													
(Democratic Republic of the Congo)	Rico	Nsimba Sisusa Simao	23	DF				→	8	8																
(Angola)	Roland			FW							9	^{2(3)}	^{2}													
(Angola)	Rui Miguel	Jorge Honésimo Miguel	24	GK							→			1	^{1(1)}	^{0}	1	^{4}	^{0}	1	^{2}	^{0}				
(Ivory Coast)	Savané	Savane Aly Touré	29	MF													4	^{9(8)}	^{0}	→						
(Angola)	Silva Anato	António da Silva Anato	25	MF							→			21	^{9(7)}	^{3}	10	^{23(4)}	^{1}	→						
(Angola)	Sotto †	António Virgílio Sotto-Mayor	31	MF	→	2012																				
(Angola)	Stélvio	Sílvio da Silva	20	FW													33	^{(4)}	^{0}							
(Democratic Republic of the Congo)	Tsherry	Thierry Bolongo Ebengi	34	GK	1	2012	→																			
(Angola)	Tino Francisco	Augusto Francisco		DF			–	9	→																	
(Angola)	Tó Carneiro	Augusto de Jesus Corte-Real Carneiro	23	DF						16	16	^{12(1)}	^{0}	16	^{13}	^{0}	→									
(Angola)	Toy Kongo	André Augusto Miranda Kongo	26	GK	→	2012	–	22	→																	
(Angola)	Tucho Cardoso	Edson Orlando A. Stok Cardoso	24	FW		→	–	→																		
(Angola)	Vado Alves	Artur Carvalho Baptista Alves	25	MF			–	5	→																	
(Angola)	Vado Kitenga	Osvaldo Pedro de Jesus Kitenga	25	DF										→			30	^{3}	^{0}							
(Angola)	Valdez	Hugo Anderson de Almeida Valdez Lourenço	28	DF		2012	20	20	20	20	20	^{8(2)}	^{0}	20	^{8(2)}	^{0}	20	^{22}	^{1}	→						
(Cape Verde)	Vally	Valdevindes Chantres Monteiro	30	DF							→			30	^{2}	^{0}										
(São Tomé and Príncipe)	Vander	Vander Ramos Pinto	25	MF						→	24	^{0}	^{0}	→												
(Cameroon)	Vata			FW				–																		
(Angola)	Venâncio	Venâncio Landu Kukula		MF										18	^{3(4)}	^{1}	18	^{4(3)}	^{1}							
(Angola)	William	William Salomão Filipe	20	DF						–	3	^{0}	^{0}													
(Angola)	Wilson Alegre	Wilson Edgar Pereira Alegre	29	GK	→		1	→																		
(Angola)	Xixa	Domingos Paulo Andrade	17	MF													29	^{3(6)}	^{0}	29	^{12(1)}	^{0}				
(Angola)	Zé Augusto	José Augusto de Oliveira Gomes	30	MF	8	→																				
(Angola)	Zé Trindade	Josué dos Anjos Romeu Trindade		DF				2																		
Years					2011	2012	2013	2014	2015	2016	2017			2018			2018–19		27	2019–20		35				

== 2001–2010 ==
G.D. Interclube players 2001–2010

Nat	Nick	Name	A	P	O.G.	R.K.	Z.P.	R.K.	G.T.	R.K.	C.M.	A.I.	J.A.	A.M.	
Nat	Nick	Name	A	P	2001	2002	2003	2004	2005	2006	2007	2008	2009	2010	
Nat	Nick	Name	A	P	5	5	7	3	7	3	1	10	8	1	
(Republic of the Congo)	Abó	Arthur Ngoulou-Yakali	27		2001	2002									
(Angola)	André, Mateus	Mateus André	25	FW	2001		2003	–	11	–					
(Angola)	Aspirina	Manuel António Pinto Cambila	24	GK							→	–	→		
(Senegal)	Baptiste Faye	Jen Baptiste Faye	–	FW										2010	↑
(Angola)	Bebé Breganha	Odimir Abreu Gabriel Breganha	–	MF					2005	6	2007	6	2009	→	↑
(Angola)	Bebeto Vieira	Abel Miguel Vieira	22	FW			2003	→							
(Angola)	Benito						2003								
(Angola)	Beto		23	FW								–			
(Angola)	Bobó						2003								
(Angola)	Bumba	Pedro António da Costa	22	FW						–	2007	19	→		
(Angola)	Cadez	Gabriel José Cusso	21	DF								–	→		
(Angola)	Capuco	Emanuel José Paulo João	–	MF										2010	↑
(Angola)	Carlos Oliveira	Victor Emanuel de Oliveira	26	DF			2003	–	2	2	2007	2	→		
(Angola)	Chaile			MF			2003	→							
(Angola)	Cristian												2009		
(Angola)	Dadão						2003								
(Angola)	Dadá				2001										
(Angola)	Dady				2001		2003	–							
(Cameroon)	Daniel Nkotto	Jean Daniel Nkotto Mikande	–	MF									2009	2010	↑
(Angola)	Dedas	Benjamim Francisco Oliveira	26	DF							→	–			
(Angola)	Dias Caires	Yahenda Joaquim Caires Fernandes	–	DF									→	2010	↑
(Angola)	Dione	Diogo Serafim Pedro	25	MF					→	–		29	→		
(Senegal)	Diop	Mbaye Diop	26	FW										2010	
(Angola)	Eduardo Pedro	Eduardo Pereira Pedro	22	DF						13	2007	14	→		
(Angola)	Eliseu Cahombo	Eliseu José Campos Cahombo						→	2005	→					
(Angola)	Emílio †	Emílio Alberto Sebastião							2005	–					
(Angola)	Enoque Guilherme	Enoque Paulo Guilherme	–	DF			2003	5	5	–					
(Angola)	Fabrício Mafuta	Fabrício Mafuta	–	DF								4	2009	2010	↑
(Angola)	Feliciano Kilange	Feliciano Mbaki Kilange		DF									2009	→	
(Angola)	Fissy	Alberto Álvaro Paca	–	DF									→	2010	↑
(Gabon)	Georges	Georges Akieremy	22					9	2005						
(Angola)	Gildo João	Hermenegildo Pedro João	27	MF					2005	→	→	17	2009	2010	→
(Angola)	Gito			DF	2001	2002	2003	30							
(Angola)	Guedes					2002									
(Angola)	Hélder Mendes	Hélder Miguel Baptista Mendes		MF			→	27	27						
(Angola)	Hippi	Domingos Paulo João José		DF				–		–	2007				
(Angola)	Igor Nascimento	Mbanino Igor Samu Nascimento									2007				
(Angola)	Ito			MF			→	–			2007				
(Angola)	Joãozinho					2002									
(Angola)	Joel Esteves	Joel Pedro Mpongo Esteves	–	DF			2003	–	20	20	2007	20	2009	2010	↑
(Angola)	José		30						2005	–					
(Angola)	Josemar Tomás	Jorge de Carvalho Tomás		GK			→	–	→						
(Democratic Republic of the Congo)	Kanu	Patrick Kanu Mbiyavanga	20	MF							2007	–	2009	–	
(Angola)	Kikas Assis	Francisco Caetano Monteiro de Assis	29	DF	2001		2003	–	4		2007	→	→	2010	→
(Angola)	Kimena							–							
(Angola)	Kito Rocha	Francisco Domingos da Rocha	–	DF					3	3	2007	3	2009	2010	↑
(Democratic Republic of the Congo)	Kisombe	Bijou Kisombe Mundaba	34	DF	2001										
(Angola)	Lambito Carlos	Osvaldo Vasco Carlos	19	GK							2007	–	→		
(Angola)	Lami, Paulo	Paulo Monteiro Lami					2003	–	→						
(Angola)	Lucas Huango	Lucas Huango	24	MF				→	2005	–	2007	24	2009		
(Angola)	Malamba						2003	–							
(Angola)	Man Baia	Marcolino João Gonçalves Santana	28							→	2007	–			
(Angola)	Man Godó			MF									2009		
(Angola)	Maninho Van-Dúnem	Leandro Mendes Van-Dúnem		MF					2005	–		→	2009		
(Angola)	Manucho Barros	João Hernani Rosa Barros	–	FW									→	2010	↑
(Angola)	Mário Hipólito	Mário Damião Hipólito	–	GK					2005	12	2007	12	2009	2010	↑
(Angola)	Mendonça	António Manuel Viana Mendonça	27	MF									2009		
(Cameroon)	Messi, Georges	Georges Parfait Mbida Messi	–	MF										2010	↑
(Angola)	Micki Gama	Miguel Cipriano da Gama	22	DF				–							
(Angola)	Miloy	Hermenegildo Marcos Joaquim	25	MF	2001	2002	2003	–	8	–					
(Angola)	Mimoso				2001	2002									
(Angola)	Mingo Ngola	Osvaldo António Ngunza Ngola	31	MF						30	2007	21	2009	2010	
(Angola)	Minguito Fernandes	Domingos dos Santos Fernandes	–	MF			2003	–	15	15	2007	15	2009	2010	↑
(Angola)	Miranda Carlos	António Miranda Carlos	23	DF	2001	2002									
(Angola)	Miro Pereira	Belmiro da Conceição Pereira	20	DF			2003	→							
(Angola)	Moco	Bruno Baptista Tolombua Fernando	–	FW									2009		↑
(Nigeria)	Moses								26						
(Democratic Republic of the Congo)	Moke	Libandi Moke			2001										
(Democratic Republic of the Congo)	Musumari	Biske Musumari		FW	2001	2002									
(Angola)	Nari	Bráulio Adélio de Olim Diniz	–	MF									2009	2010	↑
(Angola)	Ndulo Cachindele	Francisco Ndulo Cachindele	29	GK			2003	–	2005	→					
(Angola)	Nelo Francisco	Manuel Martins Francisco								26	2007				
(Angola)	Nelsinho	Nelson Victorino João	27	MF	2001	2002	2003								
(Angola)	Nelson						→	–							
(Angola)	Ngolé				2001										
(Angola)	Nito											–			
(Democratic Republic of the Congo)	Ntumba	Ntumba Firmino Ngalamulume		GK								→	2009		
(Angola)	Nunas		24	MF						→	2007	–			
(Angola)	Nuno	Nuno Alfredo António Francisco Pereira	24	FW						→	2007	8			
(Angola)	Nuno Neto	Nuno Miguel de Menezes Neto		DF						→	2007	–	2009	→	
(Angola)	Nzinga	André Nzinga	25	FW			2003	10	10	10	2007				
(Brazil)	Oseías	Oseías Luiz Ferreira	37	MF									2009		
(Angola)	Palucho				2001										
(Democratic Republic of the Congo)	Papy Shumu	Papy Lukata Shumu	23	GK	2001	2002									
(Democratic Republic of the Congo)	Patrick Mabika	Patrick Mabika			2001	2002									
(Democratic Republic of the Congo)	Pathy †	Pathy-Nsele Esengo	29	FW	2001	2002	2003	–	2005						
(Angola)	Paty	António Sapalo Lohoca Justo	–	MF								→	2009	2010	↑
(Angola)	Paulito Fuxe	Paulo Quental Fuxe	31	DF								→	2009	2010	→
(Angola)	Pedro Henriques	Pedro Manuel Henriques Dias	–	FW						9	2007	9	2009	2010	↑
(Angola)	Pedulú	Paulo Gomes Gonçalves		MF			2003	2004	2005	–	2007				
(Angola)	Pingo	Mateus João Francisco Bravo	–	DF									→	2010	↑
(Cape Verde)	Pinha	Plínio Osvaldo Fonseca Brito	32					2004							
(Angola)	Potsché				2001	2002									
(Angola)	Roger Luta	Rogério Bataga Luta					→	–	23	23	2007				
(Republic of the Congo)	Romeo	Roméo Gautier Ayessa	24	FW								27	→		
(Cameroon)	Romi	Jean-Charles Ndjom Kouang	25	MF						–	2007	7	2009	→	
(Angola)	Sassoma	Martinho João Sassoma		DF			2003	–	2005						
(Mozambique)	Soares, Dilson	Dilson Basílio Sebastião Soares	28	DF									2009	→	
(Democratic Republic of the Congo)	Tokala	Paulin Tokala Kombe	24	GK	2001										
(Democratic Republic of the Congo)	Tsherry	Thierry Bolongo Ebengi	–	GK		→	2003	1	1	–	2007	→	→	2010	↑
(Togo)	Traoré, Abdel	Abdel Djalilou Traoré	26	FW								–	2009		
(Democratic Republic of the Congo)	Wetshi	Jean Nico Wetshi Iyeni	29	DF			2003	–	2005	18	2007	18			
(Angola)	Yano Abílio	Adriano Pedro António Abílio	29	FW			2003	–	2005	16	2007	16	→		
(Angola)	Yuri Dala	Yuri Mabi Dala	26	DF			2003	–	28	–	2007	28	2009		
(Angola)	Zé Augusto	José Augusto de Oliveira Gomes	–	MF									→	2010	↑
(Angola)	Zequinhas				2001	2002	2003								
Years					2001	2002	2003	2004	2005	2006	2007	2008	2009	2010	

== 1991–2000 ==
G.D. Interclube players 1991–2000

Nat	Nick	Name	A	P								A.C.		O.G.	
Nat	Nick	Name	A	P	1991	1992	1993	1994	1995	1996	1997	1998	1999	2000	
Nat	Nick	Name	A	P	–	–	–	–	–	–	–	–	–	–	
(Angola)	Abílio Amaral	Abílio Amaral Alves Bento												2000	
(Angola)	Adão					1992									
(Angola)	André	Mateus André	–	FW										2000	↑
(Angola)	Baptista			DF										2000	
(Angola)	Buta			MF										2000	
(Angola)	Dady		–	MF										2000	↑
(Angola)	David					1992									
(Angola)	Gerry					1992									
(Angola)	Igor													2000	
(Angola)	Januário					1992									
(Angola)	Joãozinho					1992									
(Angola)	Kikas	Francisco Caetano Monteiro de Assis	–	DF										2000	↑
(Angola)	Mariano					1992									
(Angola)	Miloy	Marcos Hermenegildo Joaquim Henriques	–	MF										2000	↑
(Angola)	Mimoso			FW										2000	
(Angola)	Mingo					1992									
(Angola)	Não Tiri			DF										2000	
(Angola)	Nelo					1992									
(Angola)	Nelson					1992									
(Angola)	Paciência	António Paciência Lopes	29			1992									
(Democratic Republic of the Congo)	Papy	Papy Lukata Shumu	–	GK										2000	↑
(Democratic Republic of the Congo)	Pathy	Pathy-Nsele Esengo	–	FW										2000	↑
(Angola)	Paulito			FW										2000	
(Angola)	Quim Faria					1992									
(Angola)	Tony					1992									
(Angola)	Zequinhas		–	DF										2000	↑

== 1980–1990 ==
Inter de Luanda players 1980–1990

Nat	Nick	Name	A	P	S.		S.C.		Joka Santinho					S.C.	S.C.
Nat	Nick	Name	A	P	1980	1981	1982	1983	1984	1985	1986	1987	1988	1989	1990
Nat	Nick	Name	A	P	–	–	–	–	–	–	–	–	–	–	–
(Angola)	Aguião	Aguião Dias dos Santos								1985	1986				
(Angola)	Almeida			DF	1980										
(Angola)	Américo									1985					
(Angola)	Armando	Miguel Martins	23	MF			1982	1983	1984						
(Angola)	Bambito									1985					
(Angola)	Batalha			MF	1980										
(Angola)	Bebé	Amílcar José Domingos									1986			1989	
(Angola)	Bebeto													1989	
(Angola)	Cadete			DF	1980										
(Angola)	Caló			DF	1980										
(Angola)	Careca			MF			1982		1984						
(Angola)	Carlitos	Carlos José Lourenço da Silva	26	DF			1982	1983	1984	1985	1986	1987			
(Angola)	Correia			DF			1982								
(Angola)	Cuca	João António andré		MF	1980										
(Angola)	Espanhol				1980										
(Angola)	Eurípedes			FW			1982	1983	1984						
(Angola)	Faria			DF	1980										
(Angola)	Feliciano	Francisco Feliciano Júnior		MF			1982	1983		1985	1986	1987			
(Angola)	Felito			FW							1986				
(Angola)	Gerry			DF										1989	
(Angola)	Gika						1982								
(Angola)	Gomes	Domingos Gomes		DF			1982	1983		1985	1986	1987			
(Angola)	Isabel			FW	1980										
(Angola)	Jesus										1986			1989	
(Angola)	Joãozinho										1986				
(Angola)	Jojó				1980										
(Angola)	Kansas †	Francisco Sebastião Gomes	21	MF			1982	1983	→						
(Angola)	Lello			GK			1982	1983			1986				
(Angola)	Little John			FW	1980										
(Angola)	Lopes						1982								
(Angola)	Lourenço			DF			1982	1983	1984	1985	1986	1987			
(Angola)	Luciano						1982		1984	1985					
(Angola)	Luís	Luís Floriano								1985	1986				
(Angola)	Mangana			DF	1980		1982	1983	1984						
(Angola)	Mendinho	António Mendes da Silva	28	MF		→	1982	1983	1984	1985	1986	1987		1989	
(Angola)	Messo	Augusto Messo		MF			1982	1983	1984						
(Angola)	Miguel			FW	1980										
(Angola)	Mingo	Domingos dos Santos Samuel		FW				1983	1984	1985	1986	1987		1989	
(Angola)	Nando									1985					
(Angola)	Nelito													1989	
(Angola)	Nelson de Carvalho	Nelson André de Carvalho								1985					
(Angola)	Pacavira									1985					
(Angola)	Paciência	Afonso Paciência Lopes		DF			1982	1983	1984	1985	1986	1987			
(Angola)	Pai Lopes			FW			1982								
(Angola)	Pedro	Pedro Afonso		DF			1982	1983		1985		1987		1989	
(Angola)	Pirocas †			FW			1982	1983	1984	1985	1986	1987			
(Angola)	Quim Faria	Joaquim Faria												1989	
(Angola)	Quim Manuel	Joaquim Manuel										1987			
(Angola)	Quinito	Joaquim da Glória Miranda Cardoso		FW			1982	1983	1984	1985					
(Angola)	Rábida						1982								
(Angola)	Raúl	Raimundo Kinanga Raúl	33	MF	1980	1981	1982	1983	1984	1985	1986	1987		1989	
(Angola)	Rui	Rui Alberto Machado David		GK						1985	1986				
(Angola)	Salvador			GK					1984	1985	1986	1987		1989	
(Angola)	Simão		20	GK				1983	1984						
(Angola)	Sungura									1985	1986				
(Angola)	Toninho											1987			
(Angola)	Toy			FW			1982	1983							
(Angola)	Túbia	João Paulo Arsénio Ribeiro	23	FW					1984	1985	1986	1987		1989	
(Angola)	Xano				1980										
(Angola)	Zé Domingos	José Domingos		GK			1982	1983		1985					
(Angola)	Zeferino			FW				1983	1984	1985	1986			1989	
(Angola)	Zino			GK	1980		1982								
