= 2011 Angola Cup =

Tournament details
- Country: Angola
- Dates: 6 Jul – 11 Nov 2011
- Teams: 26

Final positions
- Champions: Interclube
- Runners-up: 1º de Agosto
- Confederation Cup: Interclube (winner)

Tournament statistics
- Matches played: 25

The 2011 Taça de Angola was the 30th edition of the Taça de Angola, the second most important and the top knock-out football club competition in Angola, following the Girabola. G.D. Interclube beat C.D. Primeiro de Agosto 5–3 in a penalty shoot-out after a 1–1 draw in regular time, to secure its third title.

The winner qualified to the 2012 CAF Confederation Cup.

== Stadia and locations ==
Location of the 2011 Angola Cup teams

| P | Team | Home city | Stadium | Capacity | 2010 | Current | P |
|---|---|---|---|---|---|---|---|
| 5 | 17 de Maio | Benguela | Estádio Municipal | 6,000 | DNP | R16 | n/a |
| 6 | Académica do Lobito | Lobito | Estádio do Buraco | 3,000 | DNP | PR | n/a |
| 6 | ARA da Gabela | Sumbe | Estádio Municipal | 3,000 | DNP | PR | n/a |
| 1 | ASA | Luanda | Estádio da Cidadela | 60,000 | Champion | R16 | ▼4 |
| 6 | Atlético do Namibe | Namibe | Estádio Joaquim Morais | 5,000 | DNP | PR | n/a |
| 6 | Baixa de Cassanje | Malanje | Estádio 1º de Maio | 3,500 | PR | PR | Steady |
| 3 | Benfica de Luanda | Luanda | Estádio dos Coqueiros | 8,000 | PR | SF | ▲3 |
| 6 | Benfica do Huambo | Huambo | Estádio dos Kurikutelas | 10,000 | DNP | PR | n/a |
| 5 | Bravos do Maquis | Luena | Estádio Mundunduleno | 4,300 | R16 | R16 | Steady |
| 6 | Desportivo da Huíla | Lubango | Estádio do Ferrovia | 15,000 | R16 | PR | ▼1 |
| 4 | Domant FC | Caxito | Estádio Municipal | 5,000 | R16 | QF | ▲1 |
| 6 | FC de Cabinda | Cabinda | Estádio do Tafe | 25,000 | PR | PR | Steady |
| 1 | Interclube | Luanda | Estádio 22 de Junho | 7,000 | Runner-Up | Champion | ▲1 |
| 4 | Kabuscorp | Luanda | Estádio dos Coqueiros | 8,000 | R16 | QF | ▲1 |
| 5 | Norberto de Castro | Luanda | Estádio dos Coqueiros | 8,000 | DNP | R16 | n/a |
| 6 | Petro de Luanda | Luanda | Estádio da Cidadela | 50,000 | R16 | PR | ▼1 |
| 6 | Porcelana FC | N'dalatando | Municipal Santos Diniz | 5,000 | PR | PR | Steady |
| 2 | Primeiro de Agosto | Luanda | Estádio da Cidadela | 50,000 | QF | Runner-Up | ▲2 |
| 3 | Primeiro de Maio | Benguela | Estádio Edelfride Costa | 6,000 | DNP | SF | n/a |
| 5 | Progresso | Luanda | Estádio dos Coqueiros | 8,000 | R16 | R16 | Steady |
| 4 | Rec da Caála | Huambo | Estádio do Ferrovia | 10,000 | R16 | QF | ▲1 |
| 5 | Recreativo do Libolo | Calulo | Estádio Municipal de Calulo | 10,000 | SF | R16 | ▼2 |
| 5 | Sagrada Esperança | Dundo | Estádio Sagrada Esperança | 8,000 | SF | R16 | ▼2 |
| 4 | Santos FC | Luanda | Estádio dos Coqueiros | 8,000 | QF | QF | Steady |
| 5 | Sporting de Cabinda | Cabinda | Estádio do Tafe | 25,000 | R16 | R16 | Steady |
| 6 | Stad do Uíge | Uíge | Estádio 4 de Janeiro | 12,000 | DNP | PR | n/a |

== Championship bracket ==
Preliminary Rounds; 6, 7 Jul 2011
Interclube (bye)
Wed, 6 Jul 2011 (pen)
Bravos Maquis | 7
ARA da Gabela | 6
ASA (bye)
Wed, 6 Jul 2011
Santos FC | 7
Desportivo Huíla | 3
Wed, 6 Jul 2011 (pen)
Benfica Huambo | 2
Domant FC | 4
Wed, 6 Jul 2011
Baixa Cassanje | 0
Sporting Cabinda | 1
Wed, 6 Jul 2011 (pen)
Benfica Luanda | 3
Académica Lobito | 0
Rec do Libolo (bye)
Wed, 6 Jul 2011
17 de Maio | 3
FC Cabinda | 2
1º de Agosto (bye)
Thu, 7 Jul 2011
Kabuscorp | 1
Atlético Namibe | 0
Sagrada Esperança (bye)
Wed, 6 Jul 2011
Stad do Uíge | 0
1º de Maio | 1
Wed, 6 Jul 2011
Norberto Castro | 2
Porcelana FC | 0
Rec da Caála (bye)
Wed, 6 Jul 2011 (pen)
Petro Luanda | 2
Progresso | 4

1/16 Finals; 27 Jul – 3 Aug 2011
Wed, 27 Jul 2011
Bravos Maquis | 0
Interclube | 2
Wed, 3 Aug 2011
ASA | 1
Santos FC | 2
Wed, 3 Aug 2011
Domant FC | 2
Sporting Cabinda | 1
Wed, 27 Jul 2011 (pen)
Benfica Luanda | 6
Rec do Libolo | 5
Wed, 27 Jul 2011
17 de Maio | 0
1º de Agosto | 3
Wed, 3 Aug 2011
Kabuscorp | 2
Sagrada | 0
Wed, 3 Aug 2011
1º de Maio | 2
Norberto Castro | 0
Wed, 3 Aug 2011
Rec da Caála | 2
Progresso | 0

Quarterfinals; Wed, 31 Aug 2011
Wed, 31 Aug 2011
Interclube | 2
Santos FC | 0
Wed, 31 Aug 2011
Domant FC | 0
Benfica Luanda | 2
Wed, 17 Aug 2011 (pen)
1º de Agosto | 4
Kabuscorp | 3
Wed, 17 Aug 2011
1º de Maio | 2
Rec da Caála | 0

Semifinals; 9 Oct – 2 Nov 2011
Sun, 9 Oct 2011
Benfica Luanda | 0
Interclube | 1
Mon, 31 Oct 2011
1º de Agosto | 2
1º de Maio | 1

Final; Fri, 11 Nov 2011
Fri, 11 Nov 2011 (pen)
Interclube | 5
1º de Agosto | 3

== Round of 32 ==
| Wed, 6 Jul 2011 R32 | Santos FC | 7–3 | Desportivo Huíla | Luanda |
| 15:00 WAT (UTC+1) | | | | Stadium: Coqueiros |

| Wed, 6 Jul 2011 R32 | Benfica Huambo | 0–0 (a.e.t.) (2–4 p) | Domant FC | Huambo |
| 15:00 WAT (UTC+1) | Faustino (yellow card); Joãozinho (yellow card) | Report | (yellow card) Amoroso; (yellow card) Micha; (yellow card) Cabetula | Stadium: Kuricutelas; Attendance: 2.500; Referee: José Muhongo; Luís Mateus, Eurico Vicesse |

| Wed, 6 Jul 2011 R32 | Benfica Luanda | 0–0 (a.e.t.) (3–0 p) | Académica Lobito | Luanda |
| 19:00 WAT (UTC+1) | | | | Stadium: Coqueiros |

| Thu, 7 Jul 2011 R32 | Kabuscorp | 1–0 | Atlético Namibe | Luanda |
| 15:00 WAT (UTC+1) | Mpele Mpele (yellow card) 18'; Sawú 43' (yellow card) 55'; Oliveira (yellow card) 44' | Report | | Stadium: Coqueiros; Attendance: 5.000; Referee: João Daniel; Francisco Jamba, Luísa Luhaco |

| Wed, 6 Jul 2011 R32 | Stad do Uíge | 0–1 | 1º de Maio | Uíge |
| 15:00 WAT (UTC+1) | | | | Stadium: Estádio 4 de Janeiro |

| Wed, 6 Jul 2011 R32 | Baixa Cassanje | 0–1 | Sporting Cabinda | Malanje |
| 15:00 WAT (UTC+1) | | | 17' Romeo | Stadium: Estádio 1º de Maio; Attendance: 5.000; Referee: João Daniel; Francisco Jamba, Luísa Luhaco |

| Wed, 6 Jul 2011 R32 | Petro Luanda | 1–1 (a.e.t.) (2–4 p) | Progresso | Luanda |
| 15:00 WAT (UTC+1) |

| Wed, 6 Jul 2011 R32 | Norberto Castro | 2–0 | Porcelana FC | Luanda |
| 15:00 WAT (UTC+1) |

| Wed, 6 Jul 2011 R32 | Bravos Maquis | – (a.e.t.) (7–6 p) | ARA da Gabela | Luena |
| 15:00 WAT (UTC+1) | | | | Stadium: Mundunduleno |

| Wed, 6 Jul 2011 R32 | 17 de Maio | 3–2 | FC Cabinda | Benguela |
| 15:00 WAT (UTC+1) | | | | Stadium: Municipal de Benguela |

== Round of 16 ==
| Wed, 27 Jul 2011 R16 | Benfica Luanda | 2–2 (a.e.t.) (6–5 p) | Rec do Libolo | Luanda |
| 15:00 WAT (UTC+1) | | | | Stadium: Coqueiros |

| Wed, 27 Jul 2011 R16 | Bravos Maquis | 0–2 | Interclube | Luena |
| 15:00 WAT (UTC+1) | | | 14' 74' Moco | Stadium: Mundunduleno; Referee: Manuel Chegado |

| Wed, 27 Jul 2011 R16 | 17 de Maio | 0–3 | 1º de Agosto | Benguela |
| 15:00 WAT (UTC+1) | | | Bena; J.Martins; Chileshe | Stadium: Municipal de Benguela |

| Wed, 3 Aug 2011 R16 | Santos FC | 2–1 | ASA | Luanda |
| 19:00 WAT (UTC+1) | Jú 26'; Lucas 48' | | 45' Chora | Stadium: Coqueiros |

| Wed, 3 Aug 2011 R16 | Domant FC | 2–1 | Sporting Cabinda | Caxito |
| 15:00 WAT (UTC+1) | | | | Stadium: Municipal do Dande |

| Wed, 3 Aug 2011 R16 | Kabuscorp | 2–0 | Sagrada | Luanda |
| 15:00 WAT (UTC+1) | Rodrigo 26'; Dr Lami 28'; Zinho (yellow card) 80' | Report | (yellow card) 42' Gabriel; (yellow card) 64' Mingo Sanda | Stadium: Coqueiros; Attendance: 3.000; Referee: Venâncio Matos; Ricardo Daniel, Tito Capingala |

| Wed, 3 Aug 2011 R16 | 1º de Maio | 2–0 | Norberto Castro | Benguela |
| 16:00 WAT (UTC+1) | | | | Stadium: Municipal de Benguela |

| Wed, 3 Aug 2011 R16 | Rec da Caála | 2–0 | Progresso | Huambo |
| 15:00 WAT (UTC+1) | Paizinho 45'; Dário 89' (yellow card); Maurício (yellow card); Femi (yellow card); Boka (yellow card) (yellow-red card) | Report | (yellow card) Lopes; (yellow card) Micki; (yellow card) (yellow-red card) Stopirrá | Stadium: Kuricutelas; Attendance: 4.000; Referee: João Daniel; Gerson Emiliano, Luís Chahua |

== Quarter-finals ==
| Wed, 31 Aug 2011 QF | Santos FC | 0–2 | Interclube | Luanda |
| 15:00 WAT (UTC+1) | Lucas (yellow card) | Report | 89' Alex; 90+2' Zé Augusto; (yellow card) Nari | Stadium: Coqueiros; Attendance: 1.000; Referee: João Bastos; Abias Moisés, Alfredo Joaquim |

| Wed, 31 Aug 2011 QF | Domant FC | 0–2 | Benfica Luanda | Caxito |
| 15:00 WAT (UTC+1) | | | 36' Reginaldo; 45' Zé | Stadium: Municipal do Dande |

| Wed, 17 Aug 2011 QF | Kabuscorp | 1–1 (a.e.t.) (3–4 p) | 1º de Agosto | Luanda |
| 15:00 WAT (UTC+1) | Abel 46'; Dax (yellow card) | Report | 63' Manucho; (red card) Dani; (red card) Amaro | Stadium: Coqueiros; Attendance: 4.000; Referee: Hélder Martins |
| | Penalties |
| | Kalobo (penalty scored); Oliveira (penalty scored) | | (penalty scored) Kali; (penalty scored) Kumaca; (penalty scored) Chileshe; (penalty scored) Danny |

| Wed, 17 Aug 2011 QF | 1º de Maio | 2–0 | Rec da Caála | Benguela |
| 18:00 WAT (UTC+1) | William 9'; Fita (yellow card) 25'; Coimbra (yellow card) 37'; Kituxi (yellow card) 72'; Gerson 80' | Report | (yellow card) 57' Campos | Stadium: Edelfride Costa; Attendance: 5.000; Referee: Venâncio Daniel; Jerson Emiliano, Wilson Ntiamba |

== Semi-finals ==
| Sun, 9 Oct 2011 SF | Benfica Luanda | 0–1 | Interclube | Luanda |
| 15:00 WAT (UTC+1) | | | 34' (pen.) Joel; (yellow card) (yellow-red card) 63' Minguito | Stadium: Coqueiros |

| Mon, 31 Oct 2011 SF | 1º de Agosto | 2–1 | 1º de Maio | Luanda |
| 15:00 WAT (UTC+1) | Amaro 25'; Kali (yellow card) 65' (goal) 80'; Elísio (yellow card) 77' | Report | 27' (yellow card) 61' Camara; (yellow card) 70' Hélder; (red card) 83' Kituxi | Stadium: Coqueiros; Referee: António Caxala; Denilson Gourgel, Miguel Luvumbo |

== Final ==
Friday, 11 November 2011
16:00

| Interclube | 1–1 (a.e.t.) | 1º de Agosto |
|---|---|---|
| Alex 79' | Report | 39' Amaro |
Penalties
| | 5–3 |

Estádio 11 de Novembro, Luanda
Attendance: 10,000
Referee: Hélder Martins

| Interclube | 1º de Agosto |

| GK | 12 | (Angola) Mário |
| RB | 2 | (Angola) Hernâni |
| CB | 4 | (Angola) Fabrício | (yellow card) 62' |
| CB | 20 | (Angola) Joel |
| LB | 5 | (Angola) Fissy |
| RM | 16 | (Cameroon) Daniel |
| CM | 11 | (Angola) Nary |
| CM | 14 | (Angola) Paty |
| LM | 29 | (Angola) Capuco | | (substituted off) 58' |
| CF | 18 | (Angola) Messi | | (substituted off) 61' |
| CF | 24 | (Angola) Manucho | (yellow card) 19' | (substituted off) 52' |
Substitutions:
| MF | 10 | (Cape Verde) Alex | | (substituted on) 52' |
| FW | 19 | (Angola) Moco | | (substituted on) 58' |
| FW | 15 | (Angola) Minguito | | (substituted on) 61' |
Manager:
(Portugal) António Caldas

| GK | 1 | (Angola) Wilson |
| RB | 18 | (Angola) Elísio | | (substituted off) 87' |
| CB | 5 | (Angola) Dani |
| CB | 21 | (Angola) Kali (c) |
| LB | 4 | (Angola) Kumaca | (yellow card) 64' |
| RM | 25 | (Angola) Nandinho | | (substituted off) 71' |
| CM | 9 | (Angola) Buá | (yellow card) 62' | (substituted off) 84' |
| CM | 13 | (Angola) Manucho |
| LM | 24 | (Angola) Amaro | (yellow card) 38' |
| CF | 17 | (Angola) Bena |
| CF | 23 | (Cape Verde) Tom |
Substitutions:
| MF | 7 | (Angola) Mingo Bile | | (substituted on) 71' |
| FW | – | (Zambia) Danny | | (substituted on) 84' |
| MF | 20 | (Portugal) Marco Bicho | | (substituted on) 87' |
Manager:
(Portugal) Carlos Manuel

Assistant referees:
Inácio Cândido
Diakanua Miguel

2011 Angola Football Cup winner

3rd title

Squad:
Laurentino, Mário, Pitchú, Tsherry (GK)
Dias Caires, Fabrício, Fissy, Hernâni, Joãozinho, Joel, Kito, Mauro, Pingo (DF)
Alex, Benvindo, Capuco, Daniel, Edson, Jojó, Messi, Minguito, Nari, Nuno, Paty, Pirolito, Zé Augusto (MF)
Jussane, Manucho Barros, Messi, Moco, Patrick, Pedro Henriques, (FW)
António Caldas (Head Coach)

== See also ==
- 2011 Girabola
- 2012 Angola Super Cup
- 2012 CAF Confederation Cup
- Interclube players
- Primeiro de Agosto players
