= 2012 Angola Super Cup =

Recreativo do Libolo	Interclube
Girabola	Taça Angola
1	2
- on aggregate

First leg
Recreativo do Libolo	Interclube
0	1
- Date: 23 February 2012
- Venue: Estádio Municipal de Calulo, Calulo

Second leg
Interclube	Recreativo do Libolo
1	1
- Date: 26 February 2012
- Venue: Estádio 22 de Junho, Luanda
- Referee: Romualdo Baltazar

The 2012 Supertaça de Angola (25th edition) was contested by Recreativo do Libolo, the 2011 Girabola champion and Petro de Luanda, the 2011 Angola cup winner. It was the last such competition to be played in a two leg format. On home court, Petro beat Libolo 1–0 to secure their 1st title as the away match in Calulo ended in a draw.

== Match details ==
=== First leg ===
23 February 2012
16:00

Recreativo do Libolo	0–1	Interclube
		56' Fabrício

Estádio Municipal de Calulo, Calulo
Referee: Manuel Francisco

Libolo	Inter

GK	12	(Angola) Lando
RB	27	(Angola) Carlitos
CB	13	(Portugal) Fernando
CB	18	(Angola) Eddie
LB	5	(Angola) Gomito
RM	14	(Angola) Vado
CM	20	(Brazil) Viola	Substituted off
CM	16	(Angola) Adawa
LM	11	(Angola) Fredy
CF	15	(Angola) Quinzinho
CF	24	(Angola) Rasca
Substitutions:
MF	9	(Guinea) Henri Camara	Substituted in
–	–	–
–	–	–
Manager:
(Angola) Zeca Amaral

GK	–	(Angola) Mário
RB	–	(Angola) Hernâni
CB	–	(Angola) Fabrício
CB	–	(Angola) Joel
LB	–	(Angola) Fissy
RM	–	(Angola) Minguito	Booked	Substituted off
CM	–	(Angola) Nari
CM	–	(Angola) Paty
LM	–	(Cape Verde) Alex
CF	–	(Angola) Manucho		Substituted off
CF	–	(Angola) Sotto		Substituted off
Substitutions:
MF	–	(Angola) Mendinho		Substituted in
DF	–	(Angola) Daniel		Substituted in
MF	–	(Angola) Pirolito		Substituted in
Manager:
(Portugal) António Caldas

Assistant referees:
Inácio Cândido
Luís Mateus
Fourth official:

=== Second leg ===
26 February 2012
15:00

Interclube	1–1	Recreativo do Libolo
Daniel 78'	Report	82' C.Caputo

Estádio 22 de Junho, Luanda
Attendance: 4,000
Referee: Romualdo Baltazar

Inter	Libolo

GK	–	(Angola) Mário
RB	–	(Angola) Hernâni
CB	–	(Angola) Fabrício
CB	–	(Angola) Joel
LB	–	(Angola) Fissy
RM	–	(Angola) Minguito		(substituted off) 61'
CM	–	(Angola) Nari	(yellow card) 45'
CM	–	(Angola) Paty
LM	–	(Cape Verde) Alex
CF	–	(Angola) Manucho		(substituted off) 73'
CF	–	(Angola) Sotto	(yellow card) 16'	(substituted off) 25'
Substitutions:
MF	–	(Angola) Luís Cláudio		(substituted in) 25'
MF	–	(Angola) Pirolito		(substituted in) 61'
DF	–	(Angola) Daniel	(yellow card) 77'	(substituted in) 73'
Manager:
(Portugal) António Caldas

GK	12	(Angola) Lando
RB	2	(Angola) Mussumari
CB	5	(Angola) Gomito
CB	6	(Angola) Chico Caputo
LB	27	(Angola) Carlitos
RM	9	(Guinea) Camara
CM	8	(Cape Verde) Sidnei	(yellow card) 45'	(substituted off) 74'
CM	20	(Brazil) Viola		(substituted off) 46'
LM	16	(Angola) Adawa	(yellow card) 54'
CF	10	(Angola) Aguinaldo		(substituted off) 33'
CF	24	(Angola) Rasca
Substitutions:
MF	11	(Angola) Fredy		(substituted in) 33'
MF	13	(Portugal) Fernando		(substituted in) 46'
MF	18	(Angola) Totó		(substituted in) 74'
Manager:
(Angola) Zeca Amaral

Assistant referees:

Fourth official:

2012 Angola Football Super Cup winner

Grupo Desportivo Interclube
4th title

Squad: Alex, Baptiste Faye, Barese, Bebé, Bryan, Castro, Daniel, Dany, Fabrício, Fissy, Hernâni, Joel, Kialunda, Kito, L.Cláudio, Manucho, Mário, Massinga, Mendinho, Messi, Minguito, Moco, Nari, Nuno, Paty, Pingo, Pirolito, Sotto, Tsherry, Toy,
Head coach: António Caldas

== See also ==
- 2011 Angola Cup
- 2011 Girabola
- Interclube players
- Recreativo do Libolo players
