= 2011 Angola Super Cup =

ASA	Interclube
Taça Angola	Girabola
1	0
- on aggregate

First leg
ASA	Interclube
0	0
- Date: 2 March 2011
- Venue: Estádio da Cidadela, Calulo
- Referee: Manuel Francisco

Second leg
Interclube	ASA
0	1
- Date: 6 March 2011
- Venue: Estádio da Cidadela, Luanda
- Referee: Pedro dos Santos

The 2011 Supertaça de Angola (24th edition) was contested by Recreativo do Libolo, the 2010 Girabola champion and Petro de Luanda, the 2010 Angola cup winner. On home court, ASA beat Interclube 1–0 to secure their 1st title as the away match in ended in a scoreless draw.

== Match details ==
=== First leg ===
2 March 2011
16:00

Interclube	0–0	ASA
	Report

Estádio da Cidadela, Luanda
Attendance: 1,800
Referee: Manuel Francisco

Inter	ASA

GK	1	(Democratic Republic of the Congo) Tsherry
RB	11	(Angola) Nari
CB	17	(Angola) Joãozinho
CB	20	(Angola) Joel
LB	5	(Angola) Fissy
RM	16	(Cameroon) Daniel		Substituted off
CM	8	(Angola) Zé Augusto (c)
CM	6	(Cape Verde) Edson	Booked
LM	25	(Angola) Benvindo		Substituted off
CF	9	(Angola) Pedro Henriques
CF	29	(Angola) Capuco	Booked	Substituted off
Substitutions:
MF	10	(Cape Verde) Alex		Substituted in
FW	24	(Angola) Manucho		Substituted in
Manager:
(Portugal) Álvaro Magalhães

GK	1	(Angola) Nuno
RB	3	(Angola) Silva (c)	Booked
CB	2	(Angola) Ângelo		Substituted off
CB	4	(Angola) Debele
LB	27	(Angola) Anastácio
RM	6	(Angola) Manuel
CM	11	(Angola) Amarildo		Substituted off
CM	13	(Angola) Matias
LM	18	(Angola) Tony Osódio
CF	7	(Angola) Chiquinho
CF	9	(Angola) Quinzinho		Substituted off
Substitutions:
FW	15	(Democratic Republic of the Congo) Bokungu		Substituted in
DF	20	(Angola) Chora		Substituted in
MF	13	(Angola) Tucho		Substituted in
Manager:
(Portugal) José Dinis

Assistant referees:

Fourth official:

=== Second leg ===
6 March 2011
15:00

ASA	1–0	Interclube
Bokungu 68'	Report

Estádio da Cidadela, Luanda
Attendance: 2,200
Referee: Pedro dos Santos

ASA	Inter

GK	1	(Angola) Nuno
RB	3	(Angola) Silva
CB	2	(Angola) Ângelo
CB	4	(Angola) Debele	(yellow card) 13'
LB	27	(Angola) Anastácio
RM	6	(Angola) Manuel
CM	–	(Angola) Jajão		(substituted off) 64'
CM	13	(Angola) Matias	(yellow card) 42'
LM	18	(Angola) Tony Osódio
CF	7	(Angola) Chiquinho
CF	9	(Angola) Quinzinho		(substituted off) 65'
Substitutions:
FW	15	(Democratic Republic of the Congo) Bokungu		(substituted in) 64'
MF	11	(Angola) Amarildo		(substituted in) 65'
Manager:
(Portugal) José Dinis

GK	1	(Democratic Republic of the Congo) Tsherry
RB	11	(Angola) Nari
CB	4	(Angola) Fabrício	(yellow card) 26'
CB	20	(Angola) Joel	(yellow card) 90'
LB	5	(Angola) Fissy
RM	13	(Angola) Pingo		(substituted off) 70'
CM	6	(Cape Verde) Edson		(substituted off) 50'
CM	14	(Angola) Paty
LM	10	(Cape Verde) Alex
CF	9	(Angola) Pedro Henriques
CF	24	(Angola) Manucho		(substituted off) 79'
Substitutions:
MF	10	(Cape Verde) Zé Augusto		(substituted in) 50'
FW	19	(Angola) Moco		(substituted in) 70'
MF	15	(Angola) Minguito		(substituted in) 79'
Manager:
(Portugal) Álvaro Magalhães

Assistant referees:
Júlio Lemos
Jerson Emiliano
Fourth official:
António Caxala

2011 Angola Football Super Cup winner

Atlético Sport Aviação
6th title

Squad: Ady, Amarildo, Anastácio, Ângelo, Bokungu, Chiquinho, Chora, Debele, Ginaldo, Lami, Manuel, Matias, Mauro, Meda, Neblú, Netinho, Nuno, Papi, Quinzinho, Silva, Tony Osódio, Tuabi, Tucho, Zinho
Head coach: José Dinis

== See also ==
- 2010 Angola Cup
- 2010 Girabola
- ASA players
- Interclube players
