= List of C.D. Huíla players =

Clube Desportivo da Huíla is an Angolan football (soccer) club based in Lubango, Huíla, Angola and plays at Estádio do Ferroviário. The club was established in 1998.

== 2020–2021 ==
C.D. Huíla players 2020–2021

Nat	#	Nick	Name	A	P	A.M.	Total Apps & Gls		
Nat	#	Nick	Name	A	P	2021	Total Apps & Gls		
Nat	#	Nick	Name	A	P	^{C}	^{S}	^{A}	^{G}
(Zambia)	24	Banda	Ephraim Banda	35	FW	2021			
(Angola)	22	Benvindo Afonso	Nsianfumu Benvindo Afonso	25	GK	2021			
(Ghana)	10	Boateng	Frederick Boateng	28	FW	2021			
(Angola)	26	Bruno Jesus	Bruno Manuel de Jesus	26	MF	2021			
(Angola)	27	Bruno Raúl	Sobral Bongo Raúl	34	DF	2021			
(Angola)	29	Cagodó	Pequenino Capewa de Castro	28	MF	2021			
(Angola)	13	Chiwe	Alfredo Cassinda Calunganga	35	DF	2021			
(Angola)	23	Dino António	Florentino de Sousa António	28	DF	2021			
(Angola)	15	Elias Daniel	Elias Chembassuco Daniel	29	MF	2021			
(Angola)	18	Emilson	Aires Emilson Gonzaga Zeca	24	DF	2021			
(Cameroon)	9	Emmanuel Njang	Emmanuel Ndip Njang	26	FW	2021			
(Angola)	16	Gogoró	João Ngunza Muanha	26	MF	2021			
(Angola)	30	Julião Pucusso	Justo Mateus Pucusso	28	GK	2021			
(Angola)	3	Malamba Muehombo	Rodrigues Pedro Muehombo	25	MF	2021			
(Angola)	20	Manucho Diniz	Osvaldo Paulo João Diniz	35	MF	2021			
(Angola)	14	Meda Nsiandamba	Vidal Miguel Paulo Nsiandamba	29	DF	2021			
(Angola)	19	Mendes, José	José Nzombo Bastos Mendes	25	FW	2021			
(Angola)	6	Milton Suca	Milton Alberto de O. Suca	26	DF	2021			
(Angola)	7	Mingo Bile	Régio Francisco Congo Zalata	34	DF	2021			
(Angola)	11	Nandinho Mendes	Fernando Bumba Mendes	27	MF	2021			
(Angola)	28	Nuno Hamuyela	Severino Augusto Hamuyela	24	MF	2021			
(Angola)	25	Pedro Kassadi	Pedro Camunga Kassadi	22	FW	2021			
(Angola)	4	Sargento	Antunes Ekundi	32	DF	2021			
(Ghana)	5	Seth	Seth Owusu	31	DF	2021			
(Angola)	8	Sidney Candeias	Sidney Eduardo Martins Candeias	34	DF	2021			
(Angola)	21	Tchutchu	Ângelo Gouveia Tyiovo Cangu	23	MF	2021			
(Angola)	12	Varito	Evaristo Francisco	28	GK	2021			
(Angola)	2	Zé Ventura	Osvaldo Paulo Ventura	25	DF	2021			
Years						2021			

== 2011–2021 ==
C.D. Huíla players 2011–2021

Nat	Nick	Name	A	P	J.M.	M.S.	M.S.	L.C.	Ivo Traça		Mário Soares												Total Apps & Gls			
Nat	Nick	Name	A	P	2011	2012	2013	2014	2015	2016	2017 (9th)			2018 (6th)			2018–19 (3rd)			2019-20			Total Apps & Gls			
Nat	Nick	Name	A	P	4b	1b	6	11	7	10	^{#}	^{A}	^{G}	^{#}	^{A}	^{G}	^{#}	^{A}	^{G}	^{#}	^{A}	^{G}	^{S}	^{A}	^{G}	
(Angola)	Ady Manuel	Adilson Joaquim Manuel	28	DF	2011	2012	2	→																		
(Angola)	Agostinho Artur	Agostinho Gabriel Artur	35	MF	2011	2012																				
(Democratic Republic of the Congo)	Ali	Abengea Mambani Ali	32	DF		→	26	26	26	26	26	^{3}	^{0}	26	^{1(1)}	^{0}	26	^{7(6)}	^{1}							
(Angola)	Ângelo Manuel	Ângelo Sebastião Manuel	32	GK				30	–																	
(Angola)	Avex	Avelino Eduardo António Craque	33	FW						6	6	^{4(1)}	^{0}													
(Angola)	Azevedo						–																			
(Angola)	Baby	Valdemar Denso António	23	MF			→	6	6																	
(Zambia)	Banda	Ephraim Banda	27	FW		→	7	→																		
(Angola)	Bebucho Henriques	Márcio Sakuala Ramalho Henriques	25	FW						17																
(Angola)	Belito Socola	Abelardo Gomes Socola	21	MF					9	9	9	^{4(7)}	^{2}	→												
(Angola)	Bena	Diveluca Simão Nascimento	30	FW		→	17	17	→																	
(Angola)	Benvindo Afonso	Nsianfumu Benvindo Afonso	24	GK													→			22	^{9}	^{0}				
(Angola)	Beto Tchifaca	Mbembe Bartolomeu Tchifaca	26	FW				→	16	16	16	^{7(5)}	^{0}	16	^{6(2)}	^{1}	16	^{6(1)}	^{2}	→						
(Ghana)	Boateng	Frederick Boateng	27	FW													→			10	^{12(1)}	^{4}				
(Angola)	Boneco	Manuel Pilartes Sambambi	25	GK				–	→																	
(Angola)	Bonifácio Caetano	Bonifácio Francisco Caetano	23	DF				24	24	24	24	^{22}	^{2}	→												
(Angola)	Bruno Jesus	Bruno Manuel de Jesus	25	MF							7	^{7(1)}	^{0}	7	^{16(4)}	^{0}	7	^{2(2)}	^{1}	26	^{1(2)}	^{0}				
(Angola)	Bruno Raúl	Sobral Bongo Raúl	33	DF					27	27	27	^{19(2)}	^{3}	27	^{22(2)}	^{1}	27	^{26(1)}	^{3}	27	^{17(2)}	^{0}				
(Angola)	Cagodó	Pequenino Capewa de Castro	27	MF		2012	29	–	29	29	29	^{11(1)}	^{1}	29	^{14(4)}	^{0}	29	^{19(4)}	^{0}	29	^{8(5)}	^{0}				
(Angola)	Capuco	Emanuel José Paulo João	27	DF			12	→																		
(Angola)	Carol	Carolino Moura Manuel Adriano	28	MF	2011	2012																				
(Angola)	Cassinda Gresmão	Carlos Cassinda Gresmão	24	MF	2011	2012	28	28	28	28	→															
(Angola)	Catana	Miguel Mule Canhanga		DF	2011																					
(Angola)	Celson Barros	Celso João Barros Costa	27	MF		→	6	→																		
(Angola)	Chano						–																			
(Angola)	Chico Mayengue	Francisco Mayengue			2011																					
(Angola)	Chico Tchilica	João Siku Tchilica	25	DF		2012	3	3	3																	
(Angola)	Chiquinho Nambalo	Feliciano Chiweyengue Nambalo	31	FW			23	23	23	23	23	^{4(4)}	^{1}													
(Angola)	Chiwe	Alfredo Cassinda Calunganga	34	DF		2012	13	13	13	13	13	^{17(1)}	^{0}	13	^{25}	^{0}	13	^{30}	^{0}	13	^{22}	^{0}				
(Cameroon)	Christian	Christian Heumi Kabon	29	MF						→	4	^{15(3)}	^{0}	4	^{24}	^{0}										
(Angola)	Cirilo Silva	Cirilo Van-Dúnem da Silva	20	MF										–	^{(1)}	^{0}										
(Angola)	Coio	Sebastião António Coio	21	GK							→			30	^{4}	^{0}	30	^{(2)}	^{0}	→						
(Angola)	Cristiano Quitembo	Cristiano Bernardo Quitembo	30	DF										23	^{11}	^{0}	→									
(Angola)	Dadão			DF			–	2	2																	
(Angola)	Dadão Bile	Adão Francisco Congo Zalata	22	MF					→	7				→												
(Angola)	Dadão Pedro	Manuel Nzagi Pedro	21	GK		→	1	→																		
(Angola)	Dany Traça	Danilson do Carmo Josefino Traça	29	MF				20	20	20	→															
(Angola)	Dedé		20	FW			–																			
(Angola)	Dié Kiala	Bulay João Domingos Kiala	18	GK	2011	→																				
(Angola)	Dudú Jack	Domingos Monteiro Jack	27	DF		→	20	→																		
(Angola)	Edson			MF	2011	2012																				
(Angola)	Efemberg	José Manuel Catendi	26	MF	2011																					
(Angola)	Elias Daniel	Elias Chembassuco Daniel	28	MF		2012	15	15	15	15	15	^{10(2)}	^{0}	15	^{10(5)}	^{1}	15	^{25(1)}	^{2}	15	^{12(1)}	^{2}				
(Angola)	Elísio Muondo	Elísio Muondo	36	DF			→	18	18	18																
(Angola)	Emilson	Aires Emilson Gonzaga Zeca	23	DF										22	^{7}	^{0}	2	^{26(1)}	^{0}	6	^{12(2)}	^{0}				
(Cameroon)	Emmanuel	Emmanuel Mbongo Ewangue	27	FW					17	→	17	^{1(2)}	^{0}							9	^{16(3)}	^{6}				
(Angola)	Esquadra	Álvaro Manuel Ngunza Cambongo	24	DF	2011																					
(Angola)	Gância	Domingos Zaya Nunes	22	GK				→	1	→																
(Angola)	Garcia Pedro	Garcia Pedro		FW				16																		
(Angola)	Honoro	Honoro Jorge Cabanga	29	MF				10																		
(Democratic Republic of the Congo)	Jacques Bitumba	Jacques Bakulu Bitumba	26	FW													9	^{1}	^{0}	→						
(Angola)	Jesus Gouveia	Jesus João Capemba Gouveia		GK		2012																				
(Democratic Republic of the Congo)	Jiresse	Mawiya Tutona Jiresse	22	FW			11	11																		
(Angola)	Jó Paciência	Joaquim Cristóvão Paciência	20	FW					→	–																
(Angola)	Jó Vidal	Mariano da Costa Vidal	23	DF							22	^{9(3)}	^{1}	22	^{14}	^{0}										
(Angola)	Joãozinho Sequeira	Carlos Alemão Sequeira	23	MF					7	→	5	^{9(1)}	^{1}													
(Angola)	Jojó Hamuyela	José Cahombo Hamuyela	26	DF			5	5	5	5				5	^{2}	^{0}	5	^{DNP}		→						
(Cape Verde)	Josi	Josi Jorge Correia Duarte	27	MF					3																	
(Angola)	Julião Pucusso	Justo Mateus Pucusso	–	GK		2012	30	→																		
(Democratic Republic of the Congo)	Kabamba	Musasa Tshatsho Kabamba	30	FW	→	2012																				
(Angola)	Kembua	Nkembo Garcia	31	FW						8	8	^{16(3)}	^{5}	8	^{2(2)}	^{0}	→									
(Angola)	Kilú	Gilberto Cristóvão Francisco	27	GK	2011																					
(Ghana)	Kissi	Kingslei Kofi Kissi	23	GK							1	^{8}	^{0}	1	^{24}	^{0}				→						
(Angola)	Kumaca	Adriano da Costa Mateus Alberto	37	DF			4	4	4	4	→															
(Angola)	Lambito	Osvaldo Vasco Carlos	28	GK					30	30	30	^{6}	^{0}	→												
(Angola)	Lami, Paulo	Paulo Monteiro Lami				→	32																			
(Cameroon)	Lionel Yombi	Lionel Vera Yombi	25	FW							→			17	^{23(1)}	^{7}	17	^{30(2)}	^{14}	→						
(Angola)	Lito Panzo	Pedro José Panzo	28	MF			21	21	10	10	10	^{2}	^{0}													
(Angola)	Malamba Muehombo	Rodrigues Pedro Muehombo	24	MF						3	3	^{1(14)}	^{0}	3	^{1(6)}	^{1}	3	^{7(21)}	^{1}	3	^{8(10)}	^{0}				
(Angola)	Maludi	Maludi Francisco Caxala	27	DF						2				→			4	^{6(3)}	^{1}	→						
(Angola)	Manico Gonçalves	Luís Manico Gonçalves	25	MF													14	^{6(17)}	^{3}	14	^{17(8)}	^{4}	→			
(Angola)	Manucho Diniz	Osvaldo Paulo João Diniz	34	MF							→			20	^{23}	^{0}	20	^{11(1)}	^{1}	20	^{7}	^{0}				
(Angola)	Manusele			MF										6	^{2(3)}	^{0}										
(Angola)	Mavambu Baptista	Mavambu João Afonso Baptista	21	MF						→	20	^{2(4)}	^{0}													
(Angola)	Mavó				2011																					
(Angola)	Mendes, José	José Nzombo Bastos Mendes	24	FW						19	19	^{3(4)}	^{1}	19	^{4(7)}	^{0}	19	^{(5)}	^{0}	19	^{2(5)}	^{1}				
(Angola)	Milton Suca	Milton Alberto de O. Suca	25	MF						→	18	^{4(5)}	^{0}	18	^{16(2)}	^{3}	18	^{29(2)}	^{1}	18	^{17(4)}	^{2}				
(Angola)	Mingo Bile	Régio Francisco Congo Zalata	33	DF													→			7	^{18(1)}	^{1}				
(Angola)	Mola					2012																				
(Angola)	Mubarak	Afonso Nguluca Caliata	20														24	^{1}	^{0}							
(Angola)	Muenho	Gervásio Domingos Calela	23	DF						→	21	^{22(1)}	^{1}	→												
(Angola)	Mukissa	Carlos Quitanda Ginga		DF		2012	–																			
(Angola)	Nanayo	Nelson Candumbo Moma	26	DF					→	22																
(Angola)	Nandinho Mendes	Fernando Bumba Mendes	26	MF				→	21	21	→			→			11	^{13(4)}	^{2}	11	^{15(4)}	^{2}				
(Angola)	Nandinho Morais	Fernando Manuel Morais	23	MF							11	^{6}	^{2}	11	^{5(10)}	^{0}	→									
(Angola)	Ndulo Simão	Cristóvão Segunda Palanga Simão	24	GK										→			1	^{34}	^{0}	1	^{17}	^{0}				→
(Angola)	Nelito Tavares	Nelione José Tavares	26	FW	2011	2012		–	→																	
(Angola)	Nick	Manuel Tezoro	25		2011	→	24	→																		
(Angola)	Nuno Cadete	Gerson Agostinho Sebastião Cadete	34	GK						1	1	^{12}	^{0}													
(Angola)	Nuno Hamuyela	Severino Augusto Hamuyela	23	MF							28	^{13(2)}	^{0}	28	^{1(8)}	^{0}	28	^{13(1)}	^{0}	28	^{19(3)}	^{0}				
(Angola)	Orlando João	Valdemar Simão João	26	MF	2011	→	19	9																		
(Angola)	Pataca	Bernardo Fernando Pataca da Silva	24	MF			→	–																		
(Angola)	Paulito Lussuamo	Apocalipis Lussuamo	22	MF	2011	2012																				
(Angola)	Pedro, Manuel	Manuel Nzazi Pedro	22	MF				27																		
(Angola)	Pedro Kassadi	Pedro Camunga Kassadi	20	FW													25	^{1(8)}	^{3}	25	^{1(2)}	^{0}				
(Angola)	Pedy	Abel Gongo José Lemos	29	MF	2011	2012	9	–	19																	
(Angola)	Pepe Marinheiro	Veloso Marinheiro	22	FW	→		–																			
(Nigeria)	Razaq	Razaq Akanni Adegbite	27	FW										→			23	^{13(2)}	^{1}	→						
(Angola)	Ruffin Boyange	Ruffin Boyange		MF		2012	–																			
(Democratic Republic of the Congo)	Ruffin Ebongo	Ruffin Motshumba Ebongo	24	MF		2012	25	25																		
(Angola)	Salú	Salustino Mucuambe Camilo Cachicote	25		2011																					
(Angola)	Sargento	Antunes Ekundi	31	DF	2011	2012	14	14	→		→			10	^{14(1)}	^{0}	10	^{30}	^{2}	4	^{19}	^{0}				
(Ghana)	Seth	Seth Owusu	30	DF													→			5	^{8}	^{0}				
(Angola)	Severino	Severino Germano Sacramento Gabriel	34	MF				→	11	11	11	⋅	⋅													
(Democratic Republic of the Congo)	Shayi	Mukengeshayi Tumba	27	FW				→	17																	
(Angola)	Sidney Candeias	Sidney Eduardo Martins Candeias	33	DF		→	8	8	8	→	14	^{18(3)}	^{0}	14	^{21(1)}	^{2}	14	^{25(1)}	^{2}	8	^{9}	^{0}				
(Angola)	Silvio Assete	Silvino Valdemar da Silva Assete	24	DF						6	→															
(Angola)	Simão Veya	Rosalino Veya	24	DF				–	–																	
(Angola)	Tchangalala		20																	32	^{DNP}					
(Angola)	Tchitchi	Cláudio Segunda Adão	30	MF				→	14	14	→															
(Angola)	Tchiyo																			33	^{DNP}					
(Angola)	Tchutchu	Ângelo Gouveia T. Cangu		MF													21	^{1(4)}	^{0}	21	^{7(6)}	^{1}				
(Democratic Republic of the Congo)	Thierry	Thierry Bolongo Ebengi	36	GK				22																		
(Angola)	Tobias Domingos	Bartolomeu de Sousa Domingos	24	MF	2011	2012	22	→																		
(Angola)	Toizinho																			34	^{DNP}					
(Angola)	Tony Cabaça	Adão Joaquim Bango Cabaça	28	GK			16	1																		
(Angola)	Varito	Evaristo Francisco	26	GK					12	12	12	^{0}	^{0}	12	^{DNP}		12	^{DNP}								
(Angola)	Vata Silva	Adão Pereira da Silva	25	MF	2011	2012	10	→																		
(Zambia)	William Chilufya	William Chilufya	29	FW	→	2012																				
(Angola)	Yuri Dias	Yuri António Dias	30	FW					25	25	25	^{12(1)}	^{3}							16	^{4(6)}	^{0}				
(Angola)	Yuri Tavares	Yuri José Chissende Tavares	23	GK	2011																					
(Democratic Republic of the Congo)	Zamba	Zamba Victor Ngolu		GK			31																			
(Angola)	Zé Ventura	Osvaldo Paulo Ventura	24	DF							2	^{10}	^{0}	2	^{16(2)}	^{0}	6	^{12(1)}	^{0}	2	^{DNP}					
(Angola)	Zinho	Adilson Pedro Francisco		MF	→	2012																				
Years					2011	2012	2013	2014	2015	2016	2017			2018			2018–19		40	2019-20		25				

== 2001–2010 ==
C.D. Huíla players 2001–2010

Nat	Nick	Name	A	P	–	A.C.	J.M.	A.B.	JHC	A.T.	A. Tramagal		A.B.	F.M.	
Nat	Nick	Name	A	P	2001	2002	2003	2004	2005	2006	2007	2008	2009	2010	
Nat	Nick	Name	A	P	14	10	13	1b	11	7	8	9	11	14	
(Angola)	Abegá Pacavira	Manuel Pedro Pacavira	23	DF									2009	2010	
(Angola)	Ady Manuel	Adilson Joaquim Manuel	–	DF										2010	↑
(Angola)	Afonso						2003								
(Angola)	Agostinho Artur	Agostinho Gabriel Artur	–	MF			2003		21	2006	2007	2008	2009	2010	↑
(Angola)	Alex						2003								
(Angola)	Anastácio								–						
(Angola)	André													2010	
(Angola)	António Cardoso	António André Cardoso							32	2006	→				
(Angola)	Artur						2003								
(Angola)	Aspirina	Manuel António Pinto Cambila	24	GK								→	2009	→	
(Angola)	Avelino Lopes	Avelino Lopes	33	FW							2007				
(Angola)	Badrinha			MF			2003								
(Angola)	Baptista, Martins	Martins Baptista	30	DF							2007	2008			
(Angola)	Basílio Aleca	Basílio Mbando Aleca		GK					12	2006	2007	→			
(Angola)	Benguela	António Cajambala Manuel							26	2006	→				
(Angola)	Bena	Diveluca Simão Nascimento	21	FW					27	→					
(Angola)	Benício	Benicio Nery Anibal Efrem	24	MF							→	2008			
(Angola)	Betinho					8									
(Angola)	Boa			FW			2003								
(Angola)	Bolofa			FW	2001	–									
(Angola)	Brandão					20									
(Angola)	Bravo da Rosa, Paulo	Paulo Bravo da Rosa		FW		–									
(Angola)	Bumba	Pedro António da Costa	23	FW								→	2009	→	
(Angola)	Buta	Pedro Buta							→	2006					
(Angola)	Cadez	Gabriel José Cusso	22	DF								→	2009	2010	
(Angola)	Calei	Eugênio Totolene F. Sambambi											2009		
(Angola)	Capessa, Severino	Severino Ulombe Capessa		GK					→	2006	→				
(Angola)	Capoco	Luciano José Capoco	25	GK							2007	→			
(Angola)	Caricoco	Paulo José Rodrigues Campos		MF				→		2006	2007				
(Angola)	Carlos Costa	Carlos Vicente da Costa									2007				
(Angola)	Carol	Carolino Moura Manuel Adriano	–	DF					→	2006	2007	2008	2009	2010	↑
(Angola)	Chaile			MF				→	14	2006					
(Angola)	Chico Tchilica	João Siku Tchilica	–	DF										2010	↑
(Angola)	Chiwe	Alfredo Cassinda Calunganga	–	DF						2006	2007	2008	2009	2010	↑
(Angola)	Costa									2006					
(Angola)	Dany Traça	Danilson do Carmo Josefino Traça	–	MF					33	2006					
(Angola)	Délcio Vicente	Délcio Fernandes Vicente		MF						2006					
(Namibia)	Dockies	Riaan Cloete	25	MF										2010	
(Angola)	Dudú Jack	Domingos Monteiro Jack	24	DF								2008	2009	2010	→
(Democratic Republic of the Congo)	Ekobolo	Ramazani Ewuizi	35	GK							→	2008	→		
(Angola)	Eliseu António	Eliseu António	21	MF								2008			
(Angola)	Emanuel						2003								
(Angola)	Esquadra	Álvaro Manuel Ngunza Cambongo	–	DF										2010	↑
(Angola)	Filipe Silva	Israel Kipindi Pacote da Silva	23	FW								→	2009	→	
(Angola)	França Mayzer	Francisco Alexandre Mayzer	20											2010	
(Angola)	Frederico					23									
(Angola)	Gil Martins	Gil Martins dos Santos	23	MF					→	2006	→				
(Angola)	Gildo João	Hermenegildo Pedro João	26	MF					→	2006	2007	→			
(Angola)	Hélder Soares	Hélder Peliganga Domingos Soares							3	2006	2007				
(Angola)	Hippi	Domingos Paulo João José	24	DF							2007	2008	→		
(Angola)	Ito			MF		17	2003	→							
(Angola)	Jaburú Avelino	Teófilo Salvador Avelino	34	FW					→	2006	2007	2008	→		
(Angola)	Jado													2010	
(Angola)	Joãozinho								–	2006					
(Angola)	Joaquim Sousa	Joaquim Sebastião de Sousa							→	2006					
(Angola)	Jongolo			DF			2003								
(Angola)	Jordão	Jordão Evaristo	23	MF							→	2008			
(Angola)	Júnior									2006	2007				
(Angola)	Kikas Quitumba	Joelson José Domingos Quitumba	20	DF										2010	
(Angola)	Kilú	Gilberto Cristóvão Francisco	25	GK								2008	→		
(Angola)	Kissa			MF				→	–						
(Angola)	Lambito	Osvaldo Vasco Carlos	–	GK								→	2009	2010	↑
(Angola)	Laúcha Joanes	Ivan Cláudio França Joanes	23	MF						2006	2007	2008	→		
(Namibia)	Letu	Abraham Letu Shatimwene	24	MF							→	2008	2009	2010	→
(Angola)	Lorna	Miguel de Sousa	20	MF									2009	2010	
(Angola)	Luís			DF		5									
(Angola)	Madaque	Hélder Fernandes Manuel		DF					29	2006	2007	→	2009		
(Angola)	Maninho Van-Dúnem	Leandro Mendes Van-Dúnem	22	MF								2008	→		
(Angola)	Mano Pinto	Valdimiro de Almeida Cardoso Pinto	29	FW						→	2007	2008	→		
(Angola)	Manucho Diniz	Osvaldo Paulo João Diniz	–	MF					35	2006	2007	2008	→	2010	↑
(Angola)	Manuel Sala	Manuel Arlindo Sala	26	DF							→	2008			
(Angola)	Mayala	Alberto Mayala Kimedica	20	GK									2009	2010	→
(Angola)	Mbinda	Afonso Lando da Silva Zilungo		DF							2007	→			
(Angola)	Melco			DF		25	2003								
(Angola)	Mia			DF		–									
(Angola)	Mingo Bile	Régio Francisco Congo Zalata	20							2006	2007	→			
(Angola)	Miranda										2007				
(Angola)	Múcua			MF		13	2003	→							
(Angola)	Nando Caquinta	Fernando Lourenço da Silva Caquinta	29	DF			2003	→	–	2006	→				
(Angola)	Nato Faial	Pedro Renato Faial		FW							→	2008	→		
(Angola)	Nejó			DF		28	2003								
(Angola)	Nelo Bernardo	Manuel Augusto da Silva Bernardo	29	DF					–	→					
(Angola)	Nelo Quiacoloca	Manuel António Quiacoloca											2009	2010	
(Angola)	Nelson Francisco	Nelson Francisco	25	MF							→	2008	2009		
(Angola)	Nuna			MF			2003								
(Angola)	Nuno Pereira	Nuno Alfredo António Francisco Pereira	22	FW			2003	→	–	→					
(Angola)	Orlando João	Valdemar Simão João	–	MF									2009	2010	↑
(Angola)	Paulito Lussuamo	Apocalipis Lussuamo	–	MF										2010	↑
(Angola)	Paulo II					14									
(Angola)	Paulo Augusto	Paulo Augusto		DF		26									
(Angola)	Pedy	Abel Gongo José Lemos	–	MF					34	2006	2007				↑
(Angola)	Pepé			MF		24	2003								
(Zambia)	Phiri	Adubelo Phiri	26	DF							2007	→	2009		
(Angola)	Piquina			FW		7									
(Angola)	Pitchu			DF			2003								
(South Africa)	Ramaphoko	Philimon Ramaphoko Jr		MF									→	2010	
(Angola)	Ribeiro			DF			2003								
(Angola)	Riquinho Sebastião	Henrique Agostinho Morais Sebastião	24	DF					6	→					
(Angola)	Rodrigo Manuel	Rodrigo Kiala Manuel	22	FW								2008		2010	→
(Angola)	Rolf	Rolf Miller Pereira	23	FW							2007	→	2009	2010	→
(Angola)	Salú	Salustino Mucuambe Camilo Cachicote	22	FW							2007	2008	→		
(Angola)	Sanches						2003								
(Brazil)	Sidney Candeias	Sidney Eduardo Martins Candeias		MF								2008	2009	2010	→
(Angola)	Stephany						2003								
(Angola)	Tião	Sebastião Félix Pereira de Carvalho	29	MF			2003		10		2007	→	2009		
(Angola)	Tino Sambo			MF			2003								
(Angola)	Tony Akwá	António Agostinho Pedro		MF			2003								
(Democratic Republic of the Congo)	Tuabi	Richard Tuabi Kasende	26	FW								2008	→	2010	→
(Angola)	Tucho Cardoso	Edson Orlando A. Stok Cardoso	18	FW								2008	→		
(Angola)	Tunga	Luís Simão Mateus								2006	→				
(Angola)	Vadinho Campos	Hamlet Divalde Sousa Campos	24	DF								→	2009	→	
(Angola)	Virgílio			GK		12									
(Angola)	Yanick, Tazi	Tazi Yanick								2006					
(Angola)	Zaipa	João Canga de Gouveia Leite	21	MF										2010	
(Angola)	Zé Bula	Roberto Carlos Duarte Moçambique		FW				→	9	→					
(Angola)	Zé Domingos	José Domingos	23	GK										2010	
(Angola)	Zela	Zela Barroso Emanuel		GK			2003								
(Angola)	Zico Nolongolo	Fernando Zico Manuel Nolongolo		DF							→	2008	→		
Years					2001	2002	2003	2004	2005	2006	2007	2008	2009	2010	

== See also ==
- Category:C.D. Huíla players
