= Enoque =

Angolan footballer (born 1987)

Personal information
- Full name: Enoque Paulo Guilherme
- Date of birth: 16 August 1987 (age 39)
- Place of birth: Angola
- Height: 1.86 m (6 ft 1 in)
- Position: Defender

Team information
- Current team: Santos de Angola

Senior career*
Years	Team	Apps	(Gls)
2007	Interclube	20	(0)
2008	Santos de Angola	25	(2)
2010	→ Rec do Libolo (loan)	7	(0)
2013–2014	ASA		
2015	Bravos Maquis		

International career
2009–	Angola	7	(0)
- * Club domestic league appearances and goals

Enoque Paulo Guilherme (born 16 August 1987), better known as Enoque, is an Angolan football defender, in Angola's top league, the Girabola.
