= 2010 Girabola =

Girabola
- Season: 2010 (Feb 19–Oct 31)
- Champions: Interclube
- Relegated: Desportivo da Huíla; Sporting de Cabinda; Benfica do Lubango
- Champions League: Interclube (winner); Rec Caála (runner-up)
- Confederation Cup: 1º de Agosto (3rd place)
- Matches played: 240
- Goals scored: 539 (2.25 per match)
- Top goalscorer: Mpele Mpele (14 goals)
- Biggest home win: Ben Lua 5–0 ASA (17 April 2011); Int Lua 5-0 Des Hui
- Biggest away win: Ben Lub 1–4 Rec Lib (15 May 2011)
- Highest scoring: Ben Lua 5–0 ASA (17 April 2011); Int Lua 5-0 Desp Huíla

The 2010 Girabola was the 32nd season of top-tier football in Angola. The season ran from 19 February to 31 October 2010. Petro Atlético were the defending champions.

The league comprised 16 teams and the bottom three were relegated to the 2011 Gira Angola.

Interclube were crowned champions, while Desportivo da Huíla, Sporting de Cabinda and Benfica do Lubango were relegated. Daniel Mpele Mpele of Kabuscorp finished as top scorer with 14 goals.

== Changes from 2010 season ==
Relegated: Académica do Lobito, Primeiro de Maio
Promoted: Benfica do Lubango, FC de Cabinda, Sporting de Cabinda, Sagrada Esperança

Locations of the 2010 Girabola teams

== League table ==
Pos	Team	Pld	W	D	L	GF	GA	GD	Pts	Qualification or relegation
1	Interclube (C)	30	17	4	9	43	20	+23	55	Qualification for Champions League
2	Recreativo da Caála	30	16	7	7	40	25	+15	55	Qualification for Champions League
3	Primeiro de Agosto	30	14	9	7	43	26	+17	51	Qualification for Confederation Cup
4	Petro de Luanda	30	14	8	8	36	20	+16	50	
5	Bravos do Maquis	30	13	9	8	41	30	+11	48	
6	Recreativo do Libolo	30	13	9	8	37	28	+9	48	
7	ASA	30	13	7	10	29	28	+1	46	
8	Kabuscorp	30	11	10	9	39	33	+6	43	
9	Académica do Soyo	30	11	9	10	39	35	+4	42	
10	Benfica de Luanda	30	11	6	13	34	39	−5	39	
11	Sagrada Esperança	30	8	11	11	26	34	−8	35	
12	FC de Cabinda	30	8	9	13	27	42	−15	33	
13	Santos FC	30	8	9	13	27	42	−15	33	
14	Desportivo da Huíla (R)	30	8	8	14	31	42	−11	32	Relegation to Provincial stages
15	Sporting de Cabinda (R)	30	7	4	19	19	36	−17	25	Relegation to Provincial stages
16	Benfica do Lubango (R)	30	5	7	18	28	59	−31	22	Relegation to Provincial stages

Updated to match(es) played on 31 October 2010. Source: Girabola.com
Rules for classification: 1) Points; 2) Head-to-head points; 3) Head-to-head goal difference; 4) Goal difference; 5) Goals scored; 6) Fair-play points; 7) Play-off.
(C) Champions; (R) Relegated

== Results ==
Home \ Away	ACS	ASA	BEN	BLB	BRA	DES	FCC	INT	KAB	PET	PRI	CAA	LIB	SAG	SCC	SAN
Académica do Soyo	—	1–1	2–1	4–0	1–2	1–0	1–0	0–3	1–0	1–1	0–0	1–2	0–1	1–1	3–2	2–0
ASA	0–2	—	0–1	4–0	1–0	3–1	1–1	1–0	0–0	0–1	1–0	1–2	2–0	1–0	2–0	0–0
Benfica de Luanda	1–3	5–0	—	2–1	0–0	1–0	1–3	1–4	1–1	1–2	1–4	3–1	0–0	2–1	1–0	2–1
Benfica do Lubango	1–2	1–2	2–1	—	2–2	1–0	1–1	0–3	0–0	0–0	1–2	2–2	2–5	2–2	1–0	2–1
Bravos do Maquis	2–1	0–1	3–2	2–0	—	1–1	2–3	1–0	1–2	1–2	2–1	0–1	1–1	2–0	1–1	4–1
Desportivo da Huíla	1–1	1–0	1–2	2–1	0–1	—	3–0	1–2	2–1	0–2	3–1	0–0	0–0	2–0	1–0	5–4
FC de Cabinda	1–1	1–1	1–2	2–1	0–3	1–0	—	1–2	2–1	0–0	4–2	0–2	0–1	0–0	1–2	1–0
Interclube	1–0	3–1	2–1	6–2	0–1	5–0	2–0	—	2–1	0–1	0–1	1–0	1–1	2–0	1–0	0–1
Kabuscorp	1–2	0–0	0–0	3–3	3–4	2–2	2–0	1–0	—	1–2	1–1	2–1	2–1	1–2	3–1	4–0
Petro de Luanda	3–2	1–3	0–0	4–0	0–0	3–0	0–1	0–1	0–0	—	0–1	0–1	1–2	1–0	1–0	0–0
Primeiro de Agosto	2–0	4–1	0–0	0–1	1–1	3–2	3–0	2–0	0–1	1–1	—	2–1	2–0	3–0	1–0	0–1
Recreativo da Caála	2–2	1–0	1–0	2–0	1–2	2–2	4–0	1–0	0–1	2–0	0–0	—	1–0	2–1	1–0	2–0
Recreativo do Libolo	0–0	0–0	2–0	1–0	0–0	3–1	1–0	0–1	3–0	1–4	2–2	1–2	—	0–1	2–1	1–0
Sagrada Esperança	2–2	2–0	2–0	2–1	1–0	1–0	1–1	1–1	0–0	0–3	0–2	1–1	2–2	—	2–0	1–2
Sporting de Cabinda	2–1	0–1	0–1	1–0	1–0	1–0	1–1	0–1	2–3	0–3	1–1	2–1	0–1	0–0	—	1–0
Santos FC	2–1	0–1	2–1	1–0	2–2	1–1	1–1	1–1	0–2	1–0	1–1	1–1	2–5	0–0	1–0	—

Updated to match(es) played on 6 November 2010. Source: girabola.com
Legend: Blue = home team win; Yellow = draw; Red = away team win.

== Season statistics ==
=== Top scorers ===
Rank	Scorer	Club	Goals
1	(Angola) Daniel Mpele Mpele	Kabuscorp	19
2	(Angola) Rasca	Recreativo do Libolo	19*

- Less games played

=== Hat-tricks ===
Player	For	Against	Result	Date
Rasca	Recreativo do Libolo	Benfica do Lubango	5-2	5 August 2010
Pedro Henriques	Interclube	Benfica do Lubango	6-2	25 May 2010
Kembua	Académica do Soyo	Benfica de Luanda	3-1	16 April 2010

2010 Girabola winner
Grupo Desportivo Interclube
2nd title

Squad: Capuco, Dias Caires, Diop, Fabrício, Fissy, Gildo, Joel, Kito, Manucho, Messi, Mingo, Minguito, Nari, Nkotto, Paty, Paulito, P.Henriques, Pingo, Tsherry, Zé Augusto
Head coach: Álvaro Magalhães
