= Paulin Tokala Kombe =

Democratic Republic of the Congo footballer

Personal information
- Full name: Paulin Kombe Tokala
- Date of birth: 26 March 1977 (age 49)
- Place of birth: Kinshasa, Zaïre
- Height: 1.79 m (5 ft 10 in)
- Position: Goalkeeper

Senior career*
Years	Team	Apps	(Gls)
1997–2000	AS Vita Club	85	(0)
2001	St. Francois Nationals	1	(0)
2001–2003	InterClube Luanda	23	(0)
2004–2006	Primeiro de Agosto	89	(0)
2005	→ Benfica Luanda (loan)	12	(0)
2006–2008	AS Mangasport	27	(0)
2008–2014	FC 105 Libreville	20	(0)

International career
1996–2004	DR Congo	29	(0)
Medal record
Representing DR Congo
Men's football
Africa Cup of Nations
Third place	1998 Burkina Faso
- * Club domestic league appearances and goals

Paulin Nkombe Tokala (born 26 March 1977) is a Congolese retired footballer who played as a goalkeeper.

== International career ==
He was part of the Congolese team for the 1998, 2000, 2002 and 2004 African Nations Cup.

== Honours ==
DR Congo

- African Cup of Nations: 3rd place, 1998
