= Joaquim Balanga =

Angolan footballer

Quinito
Personal information
- Full name: Joaquim Marcos Cunga Balanga
- Date of birth: 13 March 1998 (age 28)
- Height: 1.87 m (6 ft 1 1/2 in)
- Position: Defender

Team information
- Current team: Petro de Luanda
- Number: 24

Youth career
- Interclube

Senior career*
Years	Team	Apps	(Gls)
2018-2021	Interclube	5	(0)
2018	→ Domant (loan)	13	(0)
2021-	Petro de Luanda	34	(2)

International career^{‡}
- Angola U20
2016–	Angola	2	(0)
- * Club domestic league appearances and goals as of 25/6/25 @ 09:57(AEST) ‡ National team caps and goals as of 11:44, 9 July 2019 (UTC)

Joaquim Marcos Cunga Balanga (born 13 March 1998), commonly known as Quinito, is an Angolan footballer who currently plays as a defender.

At the youth level he played in the 2016 COSAFA U-20 Cup.

== Career statistics ==
=== Club ===
As of 9 June 2019.

Club	Season	League			Cup		Continental		Other		Total	
Club	Season	Division	Apps	Goals	Apps	Goals	Apps	Goals	Apps	Goals	Apps	Goals
Interclube	2018	Girabola	0	0	0	0	0	0	0	0	0	0
Interclube	2018–19	Girabola	5	0	1 (Note: Appearances in the Taça de Angola)	0	0	0	0	0	6	0
Interclube	Total		5	0	1	0	0	0	0	0	6	0
Domant (loan)	2018	Girabola	13	0	0	0	–		0	0	13	0
Career total			18	0	1	0	0	0	0	0	19	0

=== International ===
As of matches played 9 July 2019.

National team	Year	Apps	Goals
Angola	2016	2	0
Total		2	0
