= Edson Silva (footballer, born 1992) =

Angolan footballer

Personal information
- Full name: Edson Jesus Silva
- Date of birth: 10 September 1992 (age 34)
- Place of birth: Luanda, Angola
- Height: 1.83 m (6 ft 0 in)
- Positions: Centre back; midfielder

Team information
- Current team: Interclube
- Number: 16

Youth career
- 2003–2006: Vale de Milhaços
- 2006–2007: Ginásio Corroios
- 2007–2011: Benfica
- 2011–2012: Siena

Senior career*
Years	Team	Apps	(Gls)
2012–2015	Recreativo Caála	39	(5)
2015–2016	Enosis NP	18	(0)
2016–2017	Pinhalnovense	2	(0)
2017–2019	Sagrada	27	(2)
2019	Interclube	4	(0)

International career
2012	Angola	1	(0)
- * Club domestic league appearances and goals as of 2 March 2019

Edson Jesus Silva (born 10 September 1992 in Luanda) is an Angola retired footballer who played as a centre back or midfielder. He made one appearance for the Angola national team.

In 2019, he transferred from Sagrada Esperança to Interclube in midseason.
