= Georg Tripp =

German footballer and coach (born 1941)

Personal information
- Date of birth: 18 March 1941 (age 85)
- Place of birth: Marburg, Germany
- Position: Forward

Senior career*
Years	Team	Apps	(Gls)
–1962	VfL Marburg		
1962–1963	1. FC Köln	3	(1)
1963–1966	Kickers Offenbach		
1966–1969	Mainz 05		
1969–1970	Metz	14	(3)
1970–1971	Sedan	17	(2)
1971–1972	Olympique Avignonnais	27	(15)
1972–1973	AS Angoulême	34	(9)
1973–1976	Laval	95	(54)
1976–	RC Paris		

Managerial career
- AS Douanes
- Interclube
- * Club domestic league appearances and goals

Georg Tripp (born 18 March 1941 in Marburg) is a German football player and coach and coach. He played as a forward for VfL Marburg, 1. FC Köln, Kickers Offenbach, Mainz 05, FC Metz, CS Sedan, Olympique Avignonnais, AS Angoulême, Stade Lavallois and RC Paris. After his playing career, he became a coach with AS Douanes and Inter Luanda.

== External links and references ==
- Barreaud, Marc (1998). Dictionnaire des footballeurs étrangers du championnat professionnel français (1932-1997). L'Harmattan, Paris. ISBN 2-7384-6608-7.
- Georg Tripp at fussballdaten.de (in German)
