= Paulo Torres =

Portuguese football manager and former player (born 1971)

Personal information
- Full name: Paulo Manuel Banha Torres
- Date of birth: 25 November 1971 (age 54)
- Place of birth: Évora, Portugal
- Height: 1.74 m (5 ft 9 in)
- Position: Left-back

Team information
- Current team: Huíla (manager)

Youth career
- 1983–1985: SL Évora
- 1985–1989: Sporting CP

Senior career*
Years	Team	Apps	(Gls)
1989–1995	Sporting CP	65	(7)
1991	→ Atlético (loan)	1	(1)
1995–1996	Campomaiorense	23	(0)
1996–1998	Salamanca	29	(1)
1998	Rayo Vallecano	8	(0)
1999	Chaves	10	(1)
1999–2000	Leganés	8	(0)
2000–2001	Torreense	26	(1)
2001–2002	Penafiel	16	(0)
2002–2003	Imortal	20	(3)
Total		206	(14)

International career
1988–1989	Portugal U18	21	(4)
1990–1991	Portugal U20	12	(6)
1992–1994	Portugal U21	23	(3)
1992	Portugal	2	(0)

Managerial career
- 2003–2004: Peniche
- 2004–2006: Fátima
- 2006: Barreirense
- 2007: Bombarralense
- 2007–2009: Rio Maior
- 2009–2011: Torreense
- 2011–2012: Atlético Reguengos
- 2012–2013: Torreense
- 2013: Sporting Bissau
- 2013–2016: Guinea-Bissau
- 2017–2018: Interclube
- 2018: Kabuscorp
- 2019–2020: Sagrada Esperança
- 2021–2022: Libolo
- 2022–: Huíla
Medal record
Men's football
Representing Portugal
FIFA U-20 World Cup
Winner	1991 Portugal
UEFA European Under-21 Championship
Runner-up	1994 France
UEFA European Under-17 Championship
Runner-up	1988 Spain
- * Club domestic league appearances and goals

Paulo Manuel Banha Torres (born 25 November 1971) is a Portuguese former professional footballer who played as a left-back. He is currently manager of Girabola club C.D. Huíla.

== Playing career ==
Torres was born in Évora, Alentejo Region. During his career, which was spent entirely in his country and Spain, the free kick specialist played for Sporting CP (this included a very brief loan at Lisbon neighbours Atlético Clube de Portugal), S.C. Campomaiorense, UD Salamanca – spending one season each in the country's two major divisions – Rayo Vallecano, G.D. Chaves, CD Leganés, S.C.U. Torreense, F.C. Penafiel and Imortal DC, retiring at 31.

Torres was part of the Portugal national under-20 team, dubbed The Golden Generation, that won the 1991 FIFA World Youth Championship on home soil, scoring two goals through long-distance free kicks and three in total during the tournament. He also won two full caps, both the following year.

== Coaching career ==
Torres took up coaching immediately after retiring as a player, managing exclusively in the lower leagues in Portugal. On 29 November 2013, he was appointed as head coach of the Guinea-Bissau national team.

In September 2015, Torres received a four-match ban from the Confederation of African Football for abusing a referee during the 2017 Africa Cup of Nations qualification game against Zambia three months earlier. He was sacked in March of the following year, after a 3–1 loss to Liberia.

Torres worked in the Angolan Girabola the following seasons, successively being in charge of G.D. Interclube, Kabuscorp SCP, G.D. Sagrada Esperança and C.R.D. Libolo.

== Career statistics ==
=== International ===
Appearances and goals by national team and year
National team	Year	Apps	Goals
Portugal	1992	2	0
Total		2	0

== Honours ==
Sporting CP

- Taça de Portugal: 1994–95

Portugal U20

- FIFA U-20 World Cup: 1991
