= Fernando Silva (footballer, born 1980) =

Portuguese footballer

Fernando
Personal information
- Full name: Fernando Dinarte Santos Silva
- Date of birth: 3 October 1980 (age 46)
- Place of birth: Funchal, Portugal
- Height: 1.81 m (5 ft 11 in)
- Position: Centre back

Youth career
- 1991–1999: Marítimo

Senior career*
Years	Team	Apps	(Gls)
1999–2010	Marítimo B	163	(9)
2001–2011	Marítimo	61	(2)
2011–2012	Libolo		
Total		224	(11)
- * Club domestic league appearances and goals

Fernando Dinarte Santos Silva (born 3 October 1980), known simply as Fernando, is a Portuguese retired footballer. Mainly a central defender, he could also play as a defensive midfielder.

== Football career ==
Fernando was born in Funchal, Madeira. After also playing youth football there he was promoted to local powerhouse C.S. Marítimo's first team for the 1999–2000 season, but served only as a backup for the vast majority of his 12-year spell.

On 30 September 2007, in a 1–1 away draw against C.F. Estrela da Amadora, Fernando scored the club's historical 1,000 goal in the Primeira Liga. However, he appeared in just five games during that campaign.

Fernando played a combined 23 league matches for Marítimo in the following three years – no appearances whatsoever in 2010–11 – continuing to feature for the reserves sporadically. At the age of 30 he moved abroad for the first time, signing with C.R.D. Libolo in Angola.
