= Dany Mendes Ribeiro =

Cape Verdean footballer (born 1988)

Dany
Personal information
- Full name: Dany Mendes Ribeiro
- Date of birth: 25 May 1988 (age 38)
- Place of birth: Sal, Cape Verde
- Height: 1.77 m (5 ft 10 in)
- Position: Forward

Youth career
- 2005–2006: Batuque
- 2006–2007: Leixões

Senior career*
Years	Team	Apps	(Gls)
2007–2008	Freamunde	7	(0)
2008–2009	Gloria Bistriţa	1	(0)
2009	Gloria Bistriţa II	5	(1)
2009	Gil Vicente	3	(0)
2010	Tondela	10	(0)
2010	Sertanense	7	(3)
2011	Libolo		
2012–2013	Interclube		
2014	Progresso do Sambizanga		
2015–2017	4 de Abril		
2017	Sertanense	0	(0)
2018	CD Operário	5	(0)
2018–	Vitória Sernache	13	(11)

International career
	Cape Verde U20	3	(0)
- * Club domestic league appearances and goals as of 22 June 2019

Daniel Mendes Ribeiro (born 25 May 1988 in Sal), known simply as Dany, is a Cape Verdean footballer who plays as a forward.
