= 2011 Girabola =

Girabola
- Season: 2011 (Mar 2–Nov 6)
- Champions: Recreativo do Libolo
- Relegated: FC Cabinda; Primeiro de Maio; Académica Lobito
- Champions League: Recreativo do Libolo (Girabola winner)
- Matches played: 240
- Goals scored: 532 (2.22 per match)
- Top goalscorer: Love Cabungula (20 goals)
- Biggest home win: Petro Atlético 7–0 Onze Bravos (17 April 2011)
- Biggest away win: Académica do Lobito 1–4 Benfica Luanda (15 May 2011)
- Highest scoring: Petro Atlético 7–0 Bravos Maquis

The 2011 Girabola was the 33rd season of top-tier football in Angola. The season ran from 12 March to 6 November 2011. Interclube were the defending champions, having won their 2nd Angolan championship in 2010.

16 teams were involved in the league and the bottom three teams were relegated to the 2012 Gira Angola.

Recreativo Libolo were crowned champions, while FC Cabinda, Primeiro de Maio and Académica Lobito were relegated. Love Cabungula of Petro Luanda finished as top scorer with 20 goals.

Angola was informed by CAF that it will have only 2 teams (one team in each competition) competing in the 2012 CAF club competitions, according to the latest CAF 5-year ranking. The Girabola champion will play in the 2012 CAF Champions League.

== Teams ==
C.D. Huíla, SC Petróleos de Cabinda, and Sport Lubango e Benfica were directly relegated to the Gira Angola after finishing 12th, 13th and 14th respectively in the previous year's standings. They were replaced by First Division Série A champions Progresso, Série B champions Primeiro de Maio, and Académica Lobito, winners of the promotion play-off between Série A and B runners-up.

== Changes from 2010 season ==
Relegated: Desportivo da Huíla, Sporting de Cabinda, Benfica do Lubango
Promoted: Académica do Lobito, Primeiro de Maio, Progresso do Sambizanga

Locations of the 2011 Girabola teams

== League table ==
Pos	Team	Pld	W	D	L	GF	GA	GD	Pts	Qualification or relegation
1	Recreativo do Libolo (C)	30	17	6	7	48	26	+22	57	Qualification for Champions League
2	Kabuscorp	30	17	5	8	47	30	+17	56	
3	Petro de Luanda	30	13	12	5	46	29	+17	51	
4	Recreativo da Caála	30	14	6	10	37	34	+3	48	
5	Interclube	30	11	15	4	31	17	+14	48	
6	Primeiro de Agosto	30	10	15	5	37	28	+9	45	
7	Sagrada Esperança	30	10	11	9	26	25	+1	41	
8	Bravos do Maquis	30	9	11	10	36	41	−5	38	
9	ASA	30	9	10	11	29	29	0	37	
10	Académica do Soyo	30	9	10	11	26	28	−2	37	
11	Santos FC	30	8	12	10	34	40	−6	36	
12	Progresso do Sambizanga	30	9	9	12	28	37	−9	36	
13	Benfica de Luanda	30	9	8	13	33	36	−3	35	
14	FC de Cabinda (R)	30	7	12	11	25	30	−5	33	Relegation to Provincial stages
15	Primeiro de Maio (R)	30	7	9	14	30	42	−12	30	Relegation to Provincial stages
16	Académica do Lobito (R)	30	2	7	21	20	61	−41	13	Relegation to Provincial stages

Updated to match(es) played on 6 November 2011. Source: Girabola.com
Rules for classification: 1) Points; 2) Head-to-head points; 3) Head-to-head goal difference; 4) Goal difference; 5) Goals scored; 6) Fair-play points; 7) Play-off.
(C) Champions; (R) Relegated

== Results ==
Home \ Away	ACL	ACS	ASA	BEN	BRA	FCC	INT	KAB	PET	PRI	MAI	PRO	CAA	LIB	SAG	SAN
Académica do Lobito	—	1–0	1–1	1–4	0–2	0–2	0–3	1–1	1–3	1–1	1–5	2–2	0–0	0–2	1–0	2–2
Académica do Soyo	2–1	—	1–1	0–0	1–0	1–0	1–1	1–0	0–1	0–1	0–0	0–0	2–1	1–1	0–1	1–0
ASA	1–0	1–1	—	0–2	1–1	2–1	0–0	1–2	0–0	0–0	2–1	1–0	5–0	2–3	2–2	1–0
Benfica de Luanda	5–1	1–1	1–0	—	2–2	1–1	2–1	0–1	2–2	1–1	0–1	1–3	0–2	0–1	2–0	0–1
Bravos do Maquis	1–0	1–2	1–0	2–1	—	3–1	0–0	0–1	1–1	1–1	3–0	1–0	2–2	1–2	0–0	2–1
FC de Cabinda	2–0	1–0	0–1	1–4	1–1	—	0–0	0–2	1–1	1–1	1–1	1–0	2–1	1–0	1–1	0–0
Interclube	1–0	0–0	2–0	0–1	1–1	1–0	—	1–0	0–0	1–1	2–1	2–1	1–1	0–0	1–0	3–1
Kabuscorp	2–1	2–1	1–0	3–0	2–0	1–1	1–1	—	2–2	2–1	2–0	0–1	3–2	2–1	1–1	1–2
Petro de Luanda	3–0	1–0	1–0	2–0	7–0	0–2	2–0	2–3	—	2–0	1–1	1–1	1–1	0–1	2–1	2–0
Primeiro de Agosto	1–1	1–0	1–0	1–1	2–2	1–1	0–0	1–3	2–1	—	0–0	2–1	3–0	1–1	2–0	2–2
Primeiro de Maio	3–0	2–0	1–2	1–0	1–3	0–0	1–1	1–5	3–0	1–2	—	1–2	1–0	0–2	0–0	1–2
Progresso do Sambizanga	2–3	2–1	0–0	2–0	1–1	1–0	0–5	0–1	0–0	1–3	1–1	—	1–0	2–1	0–1	1–1
Recreativo da Caála	1–0	1–1	1–2	2–1	3–1	1–0	1–0	2–1	1–2	2–1	3–0	2–1	—	1–0	0–0	1–0
Recreativo do Libolo	2–0	2–0	2–1	3–0	3–1	3–3	1–2	3–1	1–2	0–0	3–1	4–0	1–0	—	1–0	2–0
Sagrada Esperança	2–1	2–0	2–0	0–1	1–0	1–0	0–0	1–0	2–2	1–3	3–0	0–1	2–0	1–1	—	1–1
Santos FC	1–0	3–5	1–1	0–0	3–2	1–0	1–1	1–2	2–2	1–0	1–1	1–1	1–3	3–1	1–1	—

Updated to match(es) played on 6 November 2011. Source: girabola.com
Legend: Blue = home team win; Yellow = draw; Red = away team win.

== Season statistics ==
=== Top scorers ===
Rank	Scorer	Club	Goals
1	(Angola) Love	Petro de Luanda	20
2	(Angola) Sawu	Kabuscorp	15
3	(Angola) Aguinaldo	Recreativo do Libolo	13
4	(Angola) Abel Manfuila	Kabuscorp	11
5	(Angola) Amaro	Primeiro de Agosto	10

2011 Girabola winner
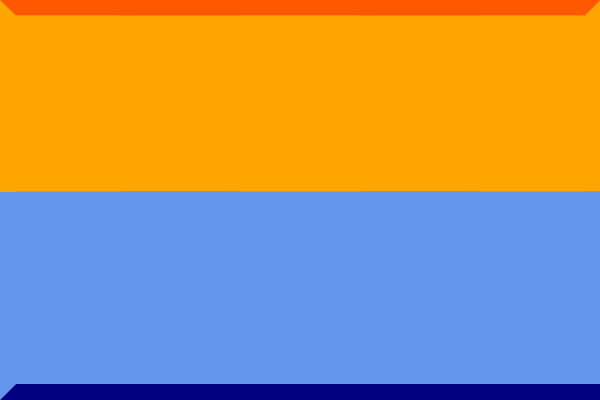
Clube Recreativo Desportivo do Libolo
1st title

Squad: Adawa, Aguinaldo, Alberto, Dany, Edinho, Edy Boyom, Enoque, Fernando, Génesis, Geovany, Gomito, Hugo, Jean-Claude, Lito, Lukose, Machado, Manú, Mendes, Miro, Pitchu, Quinzinho, Rasca, Sanches, Stélvio, Toy, Vado, Viola, Yuri, Zé Kalanga
Head coach: Zeca Amaral
