= Baptiste Faye =

Senegalese footballer

Personal information
- Full name: Baptiste Faye
- Date of birth: 18 August 1987 (age 39)
- Place of birth: Thiès, Senegal
- Height: 1.95 m (6 ft 5 in)
- Position: Centre forward

Team information
- Current team: KT Rovers

Senior career*
Years	Team	Apps	(Gls)
2007–2008	Oliveira do Hospital	14	(10)
2008–2009	Vila Meã	22	(19)
2008–2009	Vila Meã	23	(19)
2009	F.C. Vizela	25	(16)
2010–2013	Interclube	24	(14)
2010–2011	→ Ceahlăul (loan)	6	(9)
2011–2012	→ Penafiel (loan)	17	(9)
2012–2013	Interclube	13	(15)
2015	Sagrada Esperança	12	(8)
2015	Polokwane City	2	(7)
2016–2017	Luftëtari	13	(7)
2017–2019	Çetinkaya TSK	12	(10)
2020–	KT Rovers		
- * Club domestic league appearances and goals as of 8 March 2020

Baptiste Faye (born 18 August 1986) is a Senegalese footballer who is playing as a centre forward for KT Rovers in the Malaysia M3 League.
