= Thierry Bolongo =

Congolese footballer (born 1978)

Personal information
- Full name: Thierry Bolongo Ebengi
- Date of birth: 2 August 1978 (age 48)
- Place of birth: Kinshasa, Zaïre
- Height: 1.90 m (6 ft 3 in)
- Position: Goalkeeper

Senior career*
Years	Team	Apps	(Gls)
- AS Vita Club
2008–2009	Santos		
2010–2012	Interclube		
2013–2014	Onze Bravos		
2014	Huíla		
2015	Benfica		
2016	Porcelana		
2017	Estrela Clube 1∘ de Maio		

International career
2011–2012	DR Congo	4	(0)
- * Club domestic league appearances and goals

Thierry Bolongo Ebengi (born 2 August 1978) is a Congolese retired football goalkeeper.
