= Ndulo =

Angolan footballer

Personal information
- Full name: Cristóvão Simão
- Date of birth: 9 June 1996 (age 30)
- Place of birth: Lobito, Angola
- Position: Goalkeeper

Team information
- Current team: Desportivo da Huíla
- Number: 1

Youth career
- Académica do Lobito

Senior career*
| Years | Team | Apps | (Gls) |
| 2016–2018 | Académica do Lobito | 36 | |
| 2018-2020 | Desportivo da Huíla | 51 | |
| 2020-2022 | Interclube | 31 | |

International career
| 2019– | Angola | 1 | (0) |
- * Club domestic league appearances and goals as of 12:45, 29 May 2019 (UTC)

Cristóvão Segunda Palanga Simão best known as Ndulo (born June 9, 1996) is an Angolan footballer who plays as a goalkeeper currently in the Desportivo da Huíla in the Angolan league, the Girabola.
