= Nuno Fonseca =

Portuguese footballer

Personal information
- Full name: Nuno Miguel de Magalhães Fonseca
- Date of birth: 30 January 1982 (age 44)
- Place of birth: Guimarães, Portugal
- Height: 1.78 m (5 ft 10 in)
- Position: Attacking midfielder

Youth career
- 1991–1998: Vitória Guimarães
- 1998–1999: Vizela
- 1999–2000: Porto

Senior career*
Years	Team	Apps	(Gls)
2000–2002	Porto B	61	(13)
2003	União Lamas	7	(1)
2003–2005	Braga B	42	(7)
2005–2008	Moreirense	57	(9)
2006–2007	→ Famalicão (loan)	11	(2)
2008	Progresul	0	(0)
2009	Lokomotiv Mezdra	7	(0)
2009–2011	Gondomar	38	(4)
2011–2012	Interclube	?	(2)
2012–2013	Oliveirense	23	(0)
Total		246	(38)
Medal record
Men's football
Representing Portugal
FIFA U-17 World Cup
Third place	1989 Scotland
- * Club domestic league appearances and goals

Nuno Miguel de Magalhães Fonseca (born 30 January 1982 in Guimarães) is a Portuguese retired footballer who played as an attacking midfielder.

== Football career ==
Earlier in his senior career, Fonseca was under contract to both FC Porto and S.C. Braga, but only represented its reserve sides. In 2005, he signed for Moreirense F.C. in the second division, suffering relegation at the end of the season.

After splitting the following years with Moreirense and F.C. Famalicão, Fonseca moved to Romania in June 2008, signing with AFC Progresul București in the second level. However, after a couple of months, he terminated his contract.

On 22 January of the following year, Fonseca joined PFC Lokomotiv Mezdra of Bulgaria on a three-year deal. He made his debut with his new club two days later, in a 6–0 friendly routing of FC Botev Krivodol, but appeared rarely throughout the campaign as the team finished in mid-table.

Fonseca returned home in the 2009 summer, signing with division three side Gondomar SC. After two seasons the 29-year-old moved abroad again, with G.D. Interclube in Angola.
