= Veselin Jelušić =

Serbian football manager

Personal information
- Place of birth: SFR Yugoslavia

Managerial career
- Years: Team
- 1998: Angola
- 2002–2006: Botswana
- 2017–2018: Bloemfontein Celtic
- 2020–2021: City of Lusaka
- 2022–2023: Lesotho

Veselin Jelušić is a Serbian football coach.

== Career ==
He taught at the University of Belgrade in the 1990s.

He then managed two African national teams, Angola and Botswana. After leaving his role as Botswana manager he began working in youth development for the Botswana FA.

On 3 July 2017, Jelušić signed a two-year contract with South African club Bloemfontein Celtic. In October 2017 he was named Absa Premiership Coach of the Month.

He resigned in June 2018.

On 12 October 2020 he was unveiled as the head coach of Zambian club City of Lusaka.

In February 2022 he was appointed manager of the Lesotho national team. He left the position by mutual agreement in June 2023.
