= Georges Messi =

Cameroonian footballer (born 1980)

Personal information
- Full name: Georges Parfait Mbida Messi
- Date of birth: 8 December 1980 (age 45)
- Place of birth: Yaoundé, Cameroon
- Height: 1.67 m (5 ft 5 1/2 in)
- Position: Midfielder

Senior career*
Years	Team	Apps	(Gls)
1999–2000	Tonnerre Yaoundé		
2000–2001	Rizespor	9	(0)
2001–2002	Canon Yaoundé		
2003–2004	Lokeren	6	(0)
2006	Al Kharitiyat		
2006–2009	Olhanense	56	(4)
2010–2012	Interclube		
2012–2013	Persib Bandung	21	(3)
2014	Persiram	20	(9)
2015	Domant	7	(0)
2016	Porcelana		
- * Club domestic league appearances and goals

Georges Parfait Mbida Messi (born 8 December 1980) is a Cameroonian former professional footballer who played as a midfielder.

== Club career ==
Born in Yaoundé, Messi started playing with his hometown clubs Tonnerre Yaoundé and Canon Yaoundé, having a spell abroad in between with Çaykur Rizespor. He appeared scarcely during the 2000–01 season, as the Turkish Süper Lig team finished in ninth position.

Subsequently, Messi represented K.S.C. Lokeren Oost-Vlaanderen in Belgium, but featured very rarely for the Pro League side. After a few months in Qatar, he moved to Portugal and signed for S.C. Olhanense of the Segunda Liga, appearing in an average of 12 games in his first two seasons.

Messi had one of the best years as a professional in the 2008–09 campaign, scoring twice in 27 matches – mainly as a substitute – as the Algarve club returned to the Primeira Liga after 34 years. In January 2010, he left Olhanense and joined G.D. Interclube in Angola, with the Luanda-based team winning the Girabola championship shortly after.

== Honours ==
Olhanense

- Segunda Liga: 2008–09

Interclube

- Girabola: 2010
