= Edson Cruz =

Cape Verdean footballer (born 1988)

Personal information
- Full name: Edson Jorge Lopes Cruz
- Date of birth: 4 February 1988 (age 38)
- Place of birth: Mindelo, Cape Verde
- Height: 1.80 m (5 ft 11 in)
- Position: Midfielder

Youth career
- 2006–2007: Porto

Senior career*
Years	Team	Apps	(Gls)
2007–2009	Porto	0	(0)
2007–2008	→ Infesta (loan)	21	(0)
2008–2009	→ Olhanense (loan)	8	(0)
2009–2010	Gondomar	24	(1)
2010–2011	Fátima	9	(0)
2011–2012	Inter Luanda		
2012–2013	Trofense	13	(0)
2013–2014	Aris Limassol		

International career
2008	Cape Verde	4	(0)
- * Club domestic league appearances and goals

Edson "Karr" Cruz (born 4 February 1988) is a Cape Verdean former professional footballer who played as a midfielder.

== Club career ==
Cruz played in the youth teams of Porto until 2007, when initiated his senior career by being loaned to Infesta in the Portuguese Second Division during the 2007-08 season. Next year he was loaned to a more ambitious Olhanense that finished their campaign that season as champions of 2008–09 Liga de Honra and thus promoted to the Primeira Liga.

However, expired the loan deal, Cruz returned to Porto which sold him to Gondomar where he played the 2009–10 season in the Second Division, however in summer 2010 he was back to the Liga de Honra by signing with newly promoted Fátima.

In summer 2011 he moved to G.D. Interclube, commonly known as Inter Luanda, playing in the Girabola, Angolan top tier.

In December 2011 he came for a trial at Serbian SuperLiga side FK Radnički 1923.

== International career ==
Cruz played for the Cape Verde national team in 2008, when he became part of the team in the qualification matches for the 2010 African Nations Cup.
