= Mauro Almeida =

Portuguese footballer (born 1982)

Personal information
- Full name: Mauro Alexandre da Silva Almeida
- Date of birth: 29 January 1982 (age 44)
- Place of birth: Viseu, Portugal
- Height: 1.85 m (6 ft 1 in)
- Position: Defender

Senior career*
Years	Team	Apps	(Gls)
2001–2002	Porto	0	(0)
2002–2004	Estrela da Amadora	8	(0)
2004–2006	FC Zwolle	74	(8)
2006	SV Pasching	4	(1)
2006–2007	Vihren Sandanski	22	(0)
2007	Accrington Stanley	5	(0)
2007–2008	Swindon Town	0	(0)
2008–2009	Sligo Rovers	30	(5)
2010	Sligo Rovers	6	(1)
- * Club domestic league appearances and goals as of 17:41, 22 June 2008 (UTC)

Mauro Alexandre de Silva Almeida (born 29 January 1982) is a Portuguese footballer.

He started his career with top Portuguese side FC Porto, where he failed to make a first team appearance, before moving to Estrela Amadora where he stayed for two seasons. He then left to join Dutch side FC Zwolle in January 2004, where he played for a year before leaving to play for Bulgarian top division club Vihren Sandanski. He was released, but was spotted by Accrington Stanley shortly after, during a mid-season training trip to Spain. He left Stanley at the end of the season.

He signed for Swindon Town at the end of August 2007, and made his debut against Brentford in the JP Trophy on 4 September. On 27 February 2008, Sligo Rovers announced the signing of Almeida after a short trial with the club.

He left in June 2009 after a career-threatening injury. On 24 February 2010, Sligo Rovers announced the signing of Almeida after a short trial with the club.
