= Mário Hipólito =

Angolan footballer

Personal information
- Full name: Mário Damião Hipólito
- Date of birth: 1 June 1985 (age 41)
- Place of birth: Luanda, Angola
- Height: 1.84 m (6 ft 1/2 in)
- Position: Goalkeeper

Senior career*
Years	Team	Apps	(Gls)
2004–2013	Interclube	50	(0)
2014	Bravos do Maquis	6	(0)
2015–2016	Kabuscorp	4	(0)

International career^{‡}
2006–2013	Angola	5	(0)
- * Club domestic league appearances and goals as of 21 June 2006 ‡ National team caps and goals as of 18 July 2008

Mário Damião Hipólito (born 1 June 1985) is a former Angolan football goalkeeper.

== Career ==
Hipólito was born in Luanda. He was called up to the 2006 World Cup, despite never having previously appeared for the national team.
