= Aires Marques =

Cape Verdean footballer

Personal information
- Full name: Aires Sulivandro Marques Fernandes
- Date of birth: 4 December 1986 (age 39)
- Place of birth: Praia, Cape Verde
- Height: 1.74 m (5 ft 9 in)
- Position: Midfielder

Team information
- Current team: Travadores

Senior career*
Years	Team	Apps	(Gls)
2004–2005	AD Bairro		
2005–2009	Sporting Clube da Praia		
2009–2010	Mindelense		
2010–2011	Sertanense	8	(0)
2011–2014	Interclube		
2015	Benfica de Luanda	4	(0)
2016–2017	Académica Praia		
2017–2019	Celtic		
2019–	Travadores		

International career^{‡}
2013–2019	Cape Verde	3	(0)
- * Club domestic league appearances and goals as of 15 April 2024 ‡ National team caps and goals as of 15 April 2024

Aires Sulivandro Marques Fernandes (born 4 December 1986) is a Cape Verdean international footballer who plays for Travadores as a midfielder.

== Career ==
Marques has played club football for Sporting Clube da Praia, Mindelense, Sertanense and Interclube.

He made his international debut for Cape Verde in 2013.
