= Manucho Barros =

Angolan footballer

Personal information
- Full name: João Hernani Rosa Barros
- Date of birth: 19 April 1986 (age 40)
- Position: Striker

Senior career*
Years	Team	Apps	(Gls)
2009	Santos Luanda		
2010	GD Libolo		
2010–2012	G.D. Interclube		
2013–2015	Progresso		

International career
	Angola	5	(1)
- * Club domestic league appearances and goals

João Hernani Rosa Barros (born 19 April 1986) is an Angolan former footballer who last played for home country club Progresso do Sambizanga in the Girabola as a striker. He is a former member of the Angola national football team, having played at the 2012 Africa Cup of Nations.

He is a brother of Recreativo do Libolo basketball player Mílton Barros.
