= Paty (footballer) =

Angolan footballer

Personal information
- Full name: Antonio Sapalo Lohoca Justo
- Date of birth: 3 June 1990 (age 36)
- Place of birth: Angola
- Height: 1.68 m (5 ft 6 in)
- Position: Midfielder

Team information
- Current team: InterClube
- Number: 14

Senior career*
Years	Team	Apps	(Gls)
2012–	InterClube	139	(19)

International career^{‡}
2012–	Angola	26	(0)
- * Club domestic league appearances and goals as of 27 March 2019 ‡ National team caps and goals as of 30 October 2018

António Sapalo Lohoca Justo, best known as "Paty", is an Angolan footballer who plays as a midfielder for Interclube.
