= C.R.D. Libolo =

Angolan sports club

Recreativo do Libolo
- Full name: Clube Recreativo Desportivo do Libolo
- Nickname: Os Coelhos (The Rabbits)
- Founded: 14 August 1942; 84 years ago
- Ground: Estádio Municipal de Calulo; Calulo, Angola
- Capacity: 5,000
- President: Leonel Casimiro
- Manager: Paulo Torres
- League: Girabola
- 2025–26: 13th
Home colours	Away colours

Clube Recreativo Desportivo do Libolo, also referred to as Recreativo do Libolo, is an Angolan multi-sports club based Calulo, Angola. The club is most well-known for its association football department, which plays in the Girabola, the top flight of the Angolan football league system. Other than football, Libolo also has departments in basketball and motor racing. Its main colors are orange, white, and blue.

== History ==
History has it that C.R.D. Libolo resulted as a merger of three clubs in the village of Calulo: Palmeiras FC, Cambuco FC and Fortaleza FC.

At present, the club competes in two sports: football and basketball.

== Honours ==
- Girabola
  - Champions (4): 2011, 2012, 2014, 2015
- Taça de Angola
  - Champions (1): 2016
  - Runners-up (1): 2008
- Supertaça de Angola
  - Champions (1): 2015, 2016
  - Runners-up (3): 2012, 2013, 2017

== Recent seasons ==
C.R.D. Libolo's season-by-season performance since 2011:
As of 20 October 2017

Overall match statistics
Season	Pld	W	D	L	GF	GA	GD	%
2017	36	14	12	10	46	29	+17	0.514
2016	39	24	10	5	71	32	+39	0.679
2015	35	19	12	4	48	23	+25	0.600

Classifications
LG	AC	SC	CL	CC
5th	R16	RU	–	GS
3rd	1st	W	R16	–
1st	QF	W	PR	–

Top season scorers
Player	LG	AC	SC	CL	CC	T
Paizinho	9	2	0	–	0	11
Luiz Phellype	7	2	1	3		13
Fredy	10	1	0	1		12

- PR = Preliminary round, 1R = First round, GS = Group stage, R32 = Round of 32, R16 = Round of 16, QF = Quarter-finals, SF = Semi-finals, RU = Runner-Up, W = Winner

== Performance in CAF competitions ==
- CAF Champions League: 4 appearances

2016 – First Round
2013 – Group Stage
2012 – First Round
2010 – Preliminary Round

- CAF Confederation Cup: 2 appearances

2017 – Group Stage (Top 16)
2009 – Second Round

== Stadium ==
CRD Libolo play their home games at the multi-use Estádio Municipal de Calulo, which can hold approximately 10,000 spectators.

== Players and staff ==
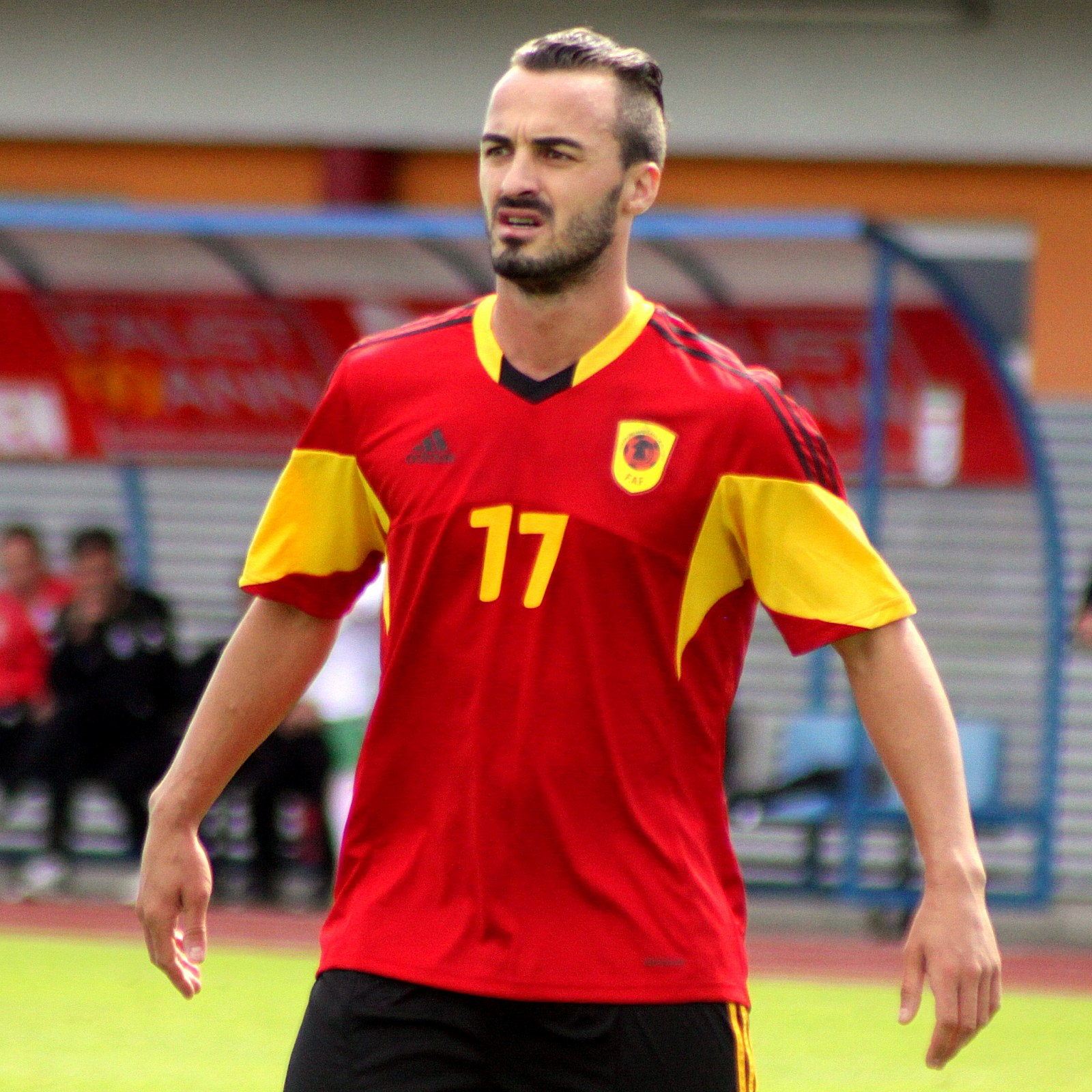
Rúben Gouveia, who represented Angola internationally, appeared 39 times for CRD Libolo

=== Staff ===
Name	Nationality	Position(s)
Technical staff
Paulo Torres	(Portugal)	Head coach
—	(Angola)	Assistant coach
Fernando Pereira	(Angola)	Goalkeeper coach
Medical
Frederico Branco	(Portugal)	Physio
Management
Leonel Casimiro	(Angola)	Chairman
Augusto Correia	(Angola)	Vice-chairman
Cacharamba Jr	(Angola)	Head of Foot Dept

== Managerial history ==
Season	Coach	S	L	C	Coach	S	L	C
2006	(Brazil) Rogério Pinto							
2007	(Brazil) Luís Mariano							
2008	(Brazil) Luís Mariano							
2009	(Brazil) Luís Mariano				(Portugal) Mariano Barreto			
2010	(Portugal) Mariano Barreto							
2011	(Angola) Zeca Amaral		2011 Girabola					
2012	(Angola) Zeca Amaral		2012 Girabola					
2013	(Portugal) Henrique Calisto				(Angola) Miller Gomes			
2014	(Angola) Miller Gomes		2012 Girabola					
2015	(France) Sébastien Desabre			2015 Angola Super Cup	(Portugal) João Paulo Costa		2015 Girabola	
2016	(Portugal) João Paulo Costa	2016 Angola Super Cup		2016 Angola Cup				
2017	(Portugal) Carlos Vaz Pinto				(Portugal) Pedro Caravela			
2018	(Angola) Kito Ribeiro				(Angola) André Macanga			
2018-19	(Portugal) Sérgio Boris				(Angola) André Macanga			
2019-20	(Angola) André Macanga							
2020-21	(Angola) Romeu Filemón				(Portugal) Paulo Torres			

== See also ==
- C.R.D. Libolo (basketball)
- Girabola
- Gira Angola
