= G.D. Interclube =

Association football club in Angola

GD Interclube
- Full name: Grupo Desportivo Interclube
- Nickname: Os Polícias
- Founded: February 28, 1976; 50 years ago
- Ground: Estádio 22 de Junho, Luanda, Angola
- Capacity: 7,800
- Chairman: Alexandre Canelas
- Manager: Ivo Campos
- League: Girabola
- 2024–25: 7th
- Website: http://interclube.co.ao/
Home colours	Away colours

Grupo Desportivo Interclube, usually known as Interclube or Inter de Luanda, is an Angolan football club based in Luanda. The club is attached to the Angolan police force. Interclube is one of the two clubs based in Luanda (the other one is 1º de Agosto) with a stadium of its own as all the remaining clubs in the capital play their home matches at the state-owned 11 de Novembro and Coqueiros. The stadium, built in 2004, has an 10,000-seat capacity.

== History ==
Founded on February 28, 1976, by the then Ministry of the Interior Santana André Pitra aka Petroff as Inter de Luanda, it won its first title, the Angolan Cup, in 1986.

In 2005, the club finished 9th in the Angolan first division. In that year, it also reached the domestic cup final, but was defeated 1–0 by ASA.

Two players from Inter represented the Angola national team in its first FIFA World Cup tournament, in 2006 in Germany: Miloy and Mário.

== Stadium ==
Interclube is one of two clubs in Angola to play their home games in their own stadium, the Estádio 22 de Junho.

== Honours ==
- Angolan League: 2
  - Winner: 2007, 2010
- Angolan Cup: 3
  - Winner: 1986, 2003, 2011
  - Runners-up: (6) 1985, 1989, 2000, 2005, 2010, 2021.
- Angolan SuperCup: 4
  - Winner: 1986, 2001, 2008, 2012
  - Runners-up: (1) 2011

== Recent seasons ==
Interclube's season-by-season performance:

Overall match statistics
Season	Pld	W	D	L	GF	GA	GD	%
2016	32	12	8	12	30	35	–5	0.563
2015	34	14	12	8	39	26	+13	0.563

Classifications
LG	AC	SC	CL	CC
7th	QF			
5th	SF			

Top season scorers
Player	LG	AC	SC	CL	CC	T
Moco	8	0				8
Moco	12	2				14

- PR = Preliminary round, 1R = First round, GS = Group stage, R32 = Round of 32, R16 = Round of 16, QF = Quarter-finals, SF = Semi-finals

== Performance in CAF competitions ==
- CAF Champions League: 2 appearances

2008 – Third Round
2011 – Second Round

- CAF Confederation Cup: 7 appearances

2004 – First Round
2005 – First Round
2006 – Group Stage
2008 – Group Stage
2011 – Semi-finals
2012 – Group Stage

- CAF Cup Winners' Cup: 2 appearances

1987 – First Round
2001 – Finalist

== Players and staff ==
=== Staff ===
Name	Nat	Pos
Technical staff
Ivo Campos	(Portugal)	Head coach
Filipe Mufinda	(Angola)	Assistant coach
Vítor Kanguimbo	(Angola)	Assistant coach
Sebastião Ndongala	(Angola)	Goalkeeper coach
Medical
Jorge Kamukanda	(Angola)	Physician
Valdomiro Nguvulu	(Angola)	Physical trainer
Nuno Nguimbo	(Angola)	Physio
Management
Alexandre Canelas	(Angola)	Chairman
Rui Kapyanga	(Angola)	Vice-chairman
Feliciano Kakulu	(Angola)	Head of Foot Dept

== Manager history ==
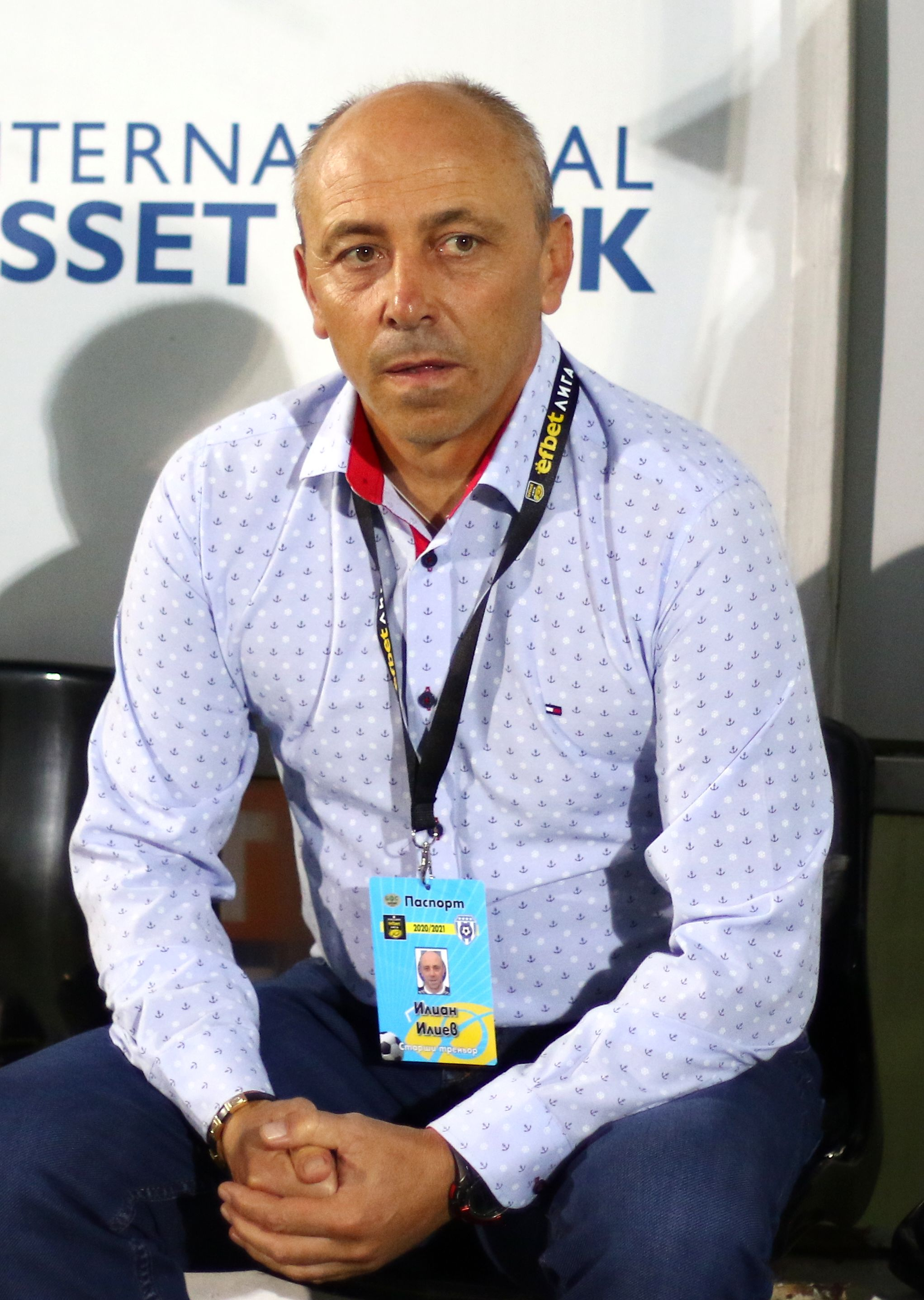
Ilian Iliev became the manager of Interclube in 2014

- (Angola) João Gonçalves da Silva (1981)
- (Angola) Severino Cardoso Smica † (1982–83)
- (Angola) Joka Santinho (1984–87)
- (Angola) Filipe Dikizeko † (1988)
- (Angola) Joka Santinho (1989)
- (Angola) Severino Cardoso Smica (1989–90)
- (Angola) Carlos Alves (1990–91)
- (Angola) João António André Cuca (1991–92)
- (Angola) João Machado (1992)
- (Angola) Raúl Kinanga (1995)
- (Angola) Napoleão Brandão (1996)
- (Angola) João António André Cuca (1997–99)
- (Angola) Arnaldo Chaves (1999)
- (Angola) Raúl Kinanga (2000)
- (Angola) Oliveira Gonçalves (2000)
- (Serbia) Veselin Jelušić (2001)
- (Angola) Oliveira Gonçalves (2001)
- (Brazil) Itamar Amorim (2002)
- (Angola) Raúl Kinanga (2002–03)
- (Serbia) Zoran Pešić (2003–04)
- (Angola) Raúl Kinanga (2004)
- (Germany) Georg Tripp (2005)
- (Portugal) Romeu Silva (2006)
- (Angola) Raúl Kinanga (2006)
- (Brazil) Carlos Mozer (2006–08)
- (Portugal) Augusto Inácio (2008–09)
- (Angola) João Arsénio Túbia (2009)
- (Portugal) Álvaro Magalhães (2009–11)
- (Portugal) António Caldas (2011–12)
- (Portugal) Bernardino Pedroto (2012–13)
- (Croatia) Mirsad Omerhodžić (2014)
- (Bulgaria) Ilian Iliev (2014–15)
- (Serbia) Veselin Jelušić (2015)
- (Portugal) Filipe Moreira (2015–16)
- (Portugal) Paulo Torres (2016–18)
- (Portugal) Rui Garcia (2018–19)
- (Portugal) Bruno Ribeiro (2018–19)
- (Portugal) Ivo Campos (2019–)

== Other sports ==
- Interclube Basketball
- Interclube Handball
