= 2007 Angola Cup =

Tournament details
- Country: Angola
- Dates: 18 Jun - 11 Nov 2016
- Teams: 22

Final positions
- Champions: Primeiro de Maio
- Runners-up: Benfica de Luanda
- 2008 CAF Confederation Cup: 1º de Maio (winner)

Tournament statistics
- Matches played: 15

The 2007 Taça de Angola was the 26th edition of the Taça de Angola, the second most important and the top knock-out football club competition following the Girabola.

The winner qualified to the 2008 CAF Confederation Cup.

== Stadiums and locations ==
Locations of the 2007 Angola Cup teams

P	Team	Home city	Stadium	Capacity	2006	Current	P
5	Académica do Soyo	Soyo	Estádio dos Imbondeiros	10,000	R16	R16	Steady
4	ASA	Luanda	Estádio da Cidadela	60,000	R16	QF	▲1
5	Atlético do Namibe	Namibe	Estádio Joaquim Morais	5,000	QF	R16	▼1
2	Benfica de Luanda	Luanda	Estádio dos Coqueiros	8,000	Runner-Up	Runner-Up	Steady
4	Benfica do Lubango	Lubango	Estádio da N.Sra do Monte	14,000	R16	QF	▲1
5	Bravos do Maquis	Luena	Estádio Mundunduleno	4,300	R16	R16	Steady
5	Desportivo da Huíla	Lubango	Estádio do Ferrovia	15,000	R16	R16	Steady
5	Interclube	Luanda	Estádio 22 de Junho	7,000	R16	R16	Steady
4	Juv do Moxico	Luena	Estádio Mundunduleno	4,300	DNP	QF	n/a
3	Petro de Luanda	Luanda	Estádio da Cidadela	50,000	SF	SF	Steady
5	Petro do Huambo	Huambo	Estádio dos Kurikutelas	17,000	DNP	R16	Steady
3	Primeiro de Agosto	Luanda	Estádio da Cidadela	50,000	Champion	SF	▼2
1	Primeiro de Maio	Benguela	Estádio Edelfride Costa	6,000	QF	Champion	▲3
5	Recreativo do Libolo	Calulo	Estádio Municipal de Calulo	10,000	DNP	R16	n/a
4	Sagrada Esperança	Dundo	Estádio Sagrada Esperança	8,000	SF	QF	▼1
5	Santos FC	Luanda	Estádio dos Coqueiros	8,000	QF	R16	▼1

== Championship bracket ==
Preliminary Rounds; 9/10 Jun 2007
Sun, 10 Jun 2007
Kabuscorp	0
Bravos Maquis	1
Sat, 9 Jun 2007
Rec do Libolo	5
Lândana FC	0

1/16 Finals; 25/26 Aug 2007
Sat, 25 Aug 2007 (pen) a.e.t.
Interclube	3
ASA	4
Sun, 26 Aug 2007 (pen) a.e.t.
Petro do Huambo	3
Primeiro de Agosto	4
Sun, 26 Aug 2007
Juv do Moxico	1
Académica Soyo	0
Sat, 25 Aug 2007 (pen) a.e.t.
Bravos Maquis	1
1º de Maio	4
Sun, 26 Aug 2007 (pen) a.e.t.
Desportivo da Huíla	4
Sagrada Esperança	6
Sun, 26 Aug 2007
Atlético Namibe	0
Benfica Luanda	1
Sun, 26 Aug 2007
Petro de Luanda	1
Santos FC	0
Sat, 25 Aug 2007
Benfica Lubango	3
Recreativo Libolo	0

Quarterfinals; 15/16 Sep 2007
Sat, 15 Sep 2007
ASA	0
1º de Agosto	1
Sun, 16 Sep 2007
Juv do Moxico	0
1º de Maio	1
Sun, 16 Sep 2007 (pen) a.e.t.
Sagrada Esperança	3
Benfica de Luanda	5
Sun, 16 Sep 2007 (pen) a.e.t.
Petro de Luanda	3
Benfica Lubango	1

Semifinals; 3/4 Nov 2007
Sun, 4 Nov 2007 (pen) a.e.t.
1º de Agosto	3
1º de Maio	4
Sat, 3 Nov 2007 (pen) a.e.t.
Benfica Luanda	9
Petro de Luanda	7

Final; 11 Nov 2007
Sun, 11 Nov 2007 a.e.t.
Primeiro de Maio	2
Benfica de Luanda	1

== Round of 16 ==
Sat, 25 Aug 2007 R16	Interclube	0–0 (a.e.t.) (3–4 p)	ASA	Luanda
15:00				Stadium: Estádio 22 de Junho; Referee: Manuel Francisco

Sat, 25 Aug 2007 R16	Bravos do Maquis	1–1 (a.e.t.) (0–3 p)	1º de Maio	Luanda
15:00	Mukota 46'	Report	43' Adolfo	Stadium: Estádio 22 de Junho; Referee: Jorge Magalhães; Luciano António, Eurico Vicesse

Sat, 25 Aug 2007 R16	Benfica Lubango	3–0	Rec do Libolo	Luena
15:00				Stadium: Estádio Mundunduleno; Referee: Venâncio Daniel

Sun, 26 Aug 2007 R16	Petro do Huambo	0–0 (a.e.t.) (3–4 p)	1º de Agosto	Huambo
15:00		Report		Stadium: Estádio dos Kurikutelas; Attendance: 200; Referee: Romualdo Baltazar, Jerson Emiliano, Cláudio Francisco
	Penalties
	Ngueno (penalty scored); Braulio (penalty scored); Faustino (penalty scored); Silva (penalty missed); Longuinha (penalty missed); Hélder (penalty missed)		(penalty scored) Joãozinho; (penalty scored) Moreno; (penalty scored) Vado; (penalty scored) Kumaka; (penalty missed) Levi; (penalty missed) Roger

Sun, 26 Aug 2007 R16	Atlético Namibe	0–1	Benfica Luanda	Namibe
15:00				Stadium: Joaquim Morais; Referee: Fernando Mação

Sun, 26 Aug 2007 R16	Desportivo Huíla	1–1 (a.e.t.) (3–5 p)	Sagrada Esperança	Lubango
15:00				Attendance: 2.000; Referee: Pedro dos Santos

Sun, 26 Aug 2007 R16	Juv do Moxico	1–0	Académica do Soyo	Mundunduleno, Luena
15:00	Henrique 78'	Report		Referee: Angelino Armando; Alberto Bumba, Sabino Francisco

Sun, 26 Aug 2007 R16	Petro Luanda	1–0	Santos FC	Luena
15:00

== Quarter-finals ==
Sat, 15 Sep 2007 QF	ASA	0–1	1º de Agosto	Luanda
15:00		Report	41' Milanzi	Stadium: Estádio dos Coqueiros; Attendance: 3,000; Referee: Pedro dos Santos; Sebastião da Silva, Faustino Cambiji

Sun, 16 Sep 2007 QF	Sagrada Esperança	0–0 (3–5 p)	Benfica Luanda	Malanje
15:00				Stadium: Estádio 1º de Maio; Referee: Paulo Talaya

Sun, 16 Sep 2007 QF	Juv do Moxico	0–1	1º de Maio	Luena
15:00		Report	87' Sting	Stadium: Estádio Mundunduleno; Referee: Leopoldo Mavunza

Sun, 16 Sep 2007 QF	Petro Luanda	1–1 (2–0 p)	Benfica Lubango	Luanda
15:00	P. Silva 85'	Report	13' Gugú	Stadium: Estádio da Cidadela; Attendance: 1,000; Referee: Hélder Martins
	Penalties
	Akwá (penalty scored); Mabiná (penalty scored); Santana (penalty missed); P.Silva (penalty missed)		(penalty missed) Diangani; (penalty missed) Nanana; (penalty missed) Kalusha; (penalty missed) Pick

== Semi-finals ==
Sat, 3 Nov 2007 SF	Benfica Luanda	2–2 (7–5 p)	Petro Luanda	Luanda
15:00	Serge 2' 77'	Report	51' Akwá; 83' Yamba Asha	Stadium: Estádio dos Coqueiros; Attendance: 3.000; Referee: Romualdo Baltazar; Jerson Emiliano, Luís Chaua

Sun, 4 Nov 2007 SF	1º de Agosto	1–1 (3–4 p)	1º de Maio	Luanda
15:00	Love 74'	Report	18' Adolfo	Stadium: Estádio dos Coqueiros; Attendance: 2.000; Referee: Jorge Magalhães
	Penalties
	Alberto (penalty missed); Gazeta (penalty missed); Love (penalty scored); Kumaca (penalty scored); Milanzi (penalty scored); Danny (penalty missed)		(penalty missed) Sassoma; (penalty missed) Fita; (penalty scored) Calala; (penalty scored) Coimbra; (penalty scored) Vunda; (penalty scored) Dinho

== Final ==
Sun, 11 November 2007
15:00

Primeiro de Maio	2–1 (a.e.t.)	Benfica de Luanda
Adolfo 76' (pen.); Fita 90+5'	Report	37' Bena

Estádio da Cidadela, Luanda
Attendance: 3.000
Referee: Pedro dos Santos

Maio	Benfica

GK	–	(Democratic Republic of the Congo) Lokwa	Booked
DF	–	(Angola) Calala
DF	–	(Angola) Dinho	(yellow card) (yellow-red card)
DF	–	(Angola) Gui	(red card) 15'
DF	–	(Angola) Lilí	Booked
MF	–	(Angola) Coimbra
MF	–	(Brazil) Jadson		(substituted off) 54'
MF	–	(Angola) Marcos
MF	–	(Angola) Sassoma
FW	–	(Angola) Adolfo		(substituted off) 90+28'
FW	–	(Angola) Sting		(substituted off) 66'
Substitutions:
DF	–	(Angola) Zezinho		(substituted on) 54'
MF	–	(Angola) Fita	Booked	(substituted on) 66'
DF	–	(Angola) Dany		(substituted on) 90+28'
Manager:
(Angola) Rui Teixeira

GK	22	(Democratic Republic of the Congo) Kizamba	Booked
DF	2	(Angola) Lito
DF	5	(Democratic Republic of the Congo) Mbala
DF	28	(Angola) Buco
DF	–	(Angola) Hero		(substituted off) 29'
MF	8	(Angola) Bota	Booked	(substituted off) 90+11'
MF	10	(Angola) Totó
MF	20	(Angola) Amaro
MF	-	(Angola) Hugo
FW	15	(Democratic Republic of the Congo) Serge	(red card) 15'
FW	14	(Angola) Avex
Substitutions:
FW	10	(Angola) Bena	Booked	(substituted on) 29'
FW	17	(Angola) Nato Faial		(substituted on) 90+11'
Manager:
(Angola) Zeca Amaral

Assistant referees:
Inácio Cândido
Denilson Gourgel
Fourth official:
Emília Dias

2007 Angola Football Cup winner

Estrela Clube Primeiro de Maio
3rd title

Squad: Adolfo, Calala, Coimbra, Dinho, Edmilson, Gerson, Gil Martins, Gui, Ito, Jadson, Kivota, Lily, Marco, Mendes, Sting, Tiganá, Vado, Vemba, Vunda, Willy, Zezinho
Head coach: Rui Teixeira

== See also ==
- 2007 Girabola
- 2008 Angola Super Cup
- 2008 CAF Confederation Cup
- Primeiro de Maio players
- Benfica de Luanda players
