= 2014 Angola Super Cup =

Supertaça de Angola 2014
Kabuscorp	Petro de Luanda
Girabola	Taça Angola
3	1
- Date: February 4, 2014
- Venue: Estádio 11 de Novembro, Luanda
- Referee: António Caxala
- Attendance: 50,000

The 2014 Supertaça de Angola (27th edition) was contested by Kabuscorp, the 2013 Girabola champion and Petro de Luanda, the 2013 Angola cup winner.

It was the first match to be played in a single leg format, since the competition began in 1985.

Before a 50,000 capacity crowd at Estádio 11 de Novembro, Kabuscorp beat Petro 3–1 to secure their 1st title.

== Match details ==
4 February 2014
16:00

Kabuscorp	3–1	Petro de Luanda
Meyong 44' 56'; Trésor 62'	Report	40' Gilberto

Estádio 11 de Novembro, Luanda
Attendance: 50,000
Referee: António Caxala

Kabuscorp	Petro

GK	22	(Angola) Rubian
RB	7	(Angola) Lunguinha
CB	28	(Angola) Zuela
CB	6	(Angola) Hernâni	(yellow card) 78'
LB	4	(Angola) Silva
RM	13	(Democratic Republic of the Congo) Dr.Lami
CM	19	(Angola) Kibeixa (c)	(yellow card) 30'
CM	16	(Angola) Fiston
LM	20	(Angola) Breco
CF	10	(Democratic Republic of the Congo) Dax		(substituted off) 29'
CF	30	(Cameroon) Meyong		(substituted off) 80'
Substitutions:
MF	8	(Democratic Republic of the Congo) Trésor		(substituted in) 29'
FW	9	(Angola) Love		(substituted in) 80'
MF	14	(Democratic Republic of the Congo) Mpele Mpele		(substituted in) 82'
Manager:
(Bulgaria) Eduard Antranik

GK	1	(Angola) Lamá
RB	21	(Angola) Mabiná	(yellow card) 74'
CB	7	(Cameroon) Etah
CB	15	(Angola) Borges
LB	3	(Angola) Ary	(yellow card) 82'
RM	28	(Angola) Manguxi
CM	5	(Angola) Osório	(yellow card) 6'	(substituted off) 60'
CM	10	(Angola) Gilberto
LM	8	(Angola) Chara (c)
CF	11	(Angola) Job	(yellow card) 78'
CF	20	(Senegal) Keita		(substituted off) 77'
Substitutions:
MF	2	(Angola) Mateus		(substituted in) 60'
MF	8	(Angola) Flávio		(substituted in) 77'
Manager:
(Brazil) Alexandre Grasseli

Assistant referees:
Jerson Emiliano
Wilson Ntyamba
Fourth official:

2014 Angola Football Super Cup winner

Kabuscorp Sport Clube do Palanca
1st title

Squad: Ab.Manfuila, Abulá, Adawa, Breco, Dax, Didí, Dr.Lami, Firmino, Fiston, Hernâni, Issama, Kialunda, Kibeixa, Kilamú, Libengué, Love, Lunguinha, Matampi, Meyong, Mpele Mpele, Nuno, Rúbia, Saki, Seleó, Silva, Trésor, Wilson, Zuela
Head coach: Eduard Antranik

== See also ==
- 2013 Angola Cup
- 2013 Girabola
- Kabuscorp players
- Petro de Luanda players
