= 2013 Angola Cup =

Tournament details
- Country: Angola
- Dates: 10 Jul – 11 Nov 2013
- Teams: 18

Final positions
- Champions: Petro de Luanda
- Runners-up: Desportivo da Huíla
- Confederation Cup: Petro Atlético (winner); Desp da Huíla (runner-up)

Tournament statistics
- Matches played: 17

The 2013 Taça de Angola was the 32nd edition of the Taça de Angola, the second most important and the top knock-out football club competition in Angola, following the Girabola. Petro de Luanda beat Desportivo da Huíla 1–0 in the final to secure its tenth title.

The winner and the runner-up qualified to the CAF Confederation Cup.

== Stadia and locations ==
Locations of the 2013 Angola Cup teams

P	Team	Home city	Stadium	Capacity	2012	Current	P
5	Académica do Soyo	Soyo	Estádio dos Imbondeiros	10,000	QF	R16	▼1
6	ASA	Luanda	Estádio da Cidadela	60,000	R16	PR	▼1
5	Atlético do Namibe	Namibe	Estádio Joaquim Morais	5,000	PR	R16	▲1
4	Benfica de Luanda	Luanda	Estádio dos Coqueiros	8,000	QF	QF	Steady
4	Bravos do Maquis	Luena	Estádio Mundunduleno	4,300	R16	QF	▲1
2	Desportivo da Huíla	Lubango	Estádio do Ferrovia	15,000	DNP	Runner-Up	n/a
3	Interclube	Luanda	Estádio 22 de Junho	7,000	QF	SF	▲1
5	Kabuscorp	Luanda	Estádio dos Coqueiros	8,000	R16	R16	Steady
4	Norberto de Castro	Luanda	Estádio dos Coqueiros	8,000	R16	QF	▲1
1	Petro de Luanda	Luanda	Estádio 11 de Novembro	50,000	Champion	Champion	Steady
5	Porcelana FC	N'dalatando	Municipal Santos Diniz	5,000	DNP	R16	n/a
5	Primeiro de Agosto	Luanda	Estádio 11 de Novembro	50,000	R16	R16	Steady
6	Primeiro de Maio	Benguela	Estádio Edelfride Costa	6,000	DNP	PR	n/a
5	Progresso do Sambizanga	Luanda	Estádio dos Coqueiros	8,000	SF	R16	▼2
3	Recreativo da Caála	Caála	Estádio Mártires da Canhala	12,000	Runner-Up	SF	▼1
4	Recreativo do Libolo	Calulo	Estádio Municipal de Calulo	10,000	QF	QF	Steady
5	Sagrada Esperança	Dundo	Estádio Sagrada Esperança	8,000	SF	R16	▼2
5	Santos FC	Luanda	Estádio dos Coqueiros	8,000	R16	R16	Steady

== Championship bracket ==
Preliminary Rounds; 10 Jul / 14 Aug 2013
Wed, 10 Jul 2013
ASA	0
Norberto Castro	1
Wed, 14 Aug 2013 (pen)
Académica Soyo	7
1º de Maio	6
0

1/16 Finals; Wed, 2 Oct 2013
Wed, 2 Oct 2013
1º de Agosto	2
Petro Luanda	3
Wed, 2 Oct 2013
Santos F.C.	0
Benfica Luanda	1
Wed, 2 Oct 2013 (pen)
Interclube	5
Progresso	4
Wed, 2 Oct 2013
Sagrada Esperança	0
Bravos Maquis	1
Wed, 2 Oct 2013 Walkover
Desportivo da Huíla	3
Atlético Namibe
Wed, 2 Oct 2013 Walkover
Norberto Castro	3
Académica Soyo	0
Wed, 28 Aug 2013
Porcelana FC	0
Rec do Libolo	1
Thu, 3 Oct 2013
Kabuscorp	0
Rec da Caála	1

Quarterfinals; Wed, 23 Oct 2013
Wed, 23 Oct 2013
Petro Luanda	1
Benfica Luanda	0
Wed, 23 Oct 2013
Interclube	1
Bravos Maquis	0
Wed, 23 Oct 2013
Desportivo Huíla	2
Norberto Castro	0
Wed, 23 Oct 2013
Rec do Libolo	0
Rec da Caála	1

Semifinals; Wed, 6 Nov 2013
Wed, 6 Nov 2013
Interclube	2
Petro Luanda	3
Wed, 6 Nov 2013
Desportivo Huíla	3
Rec da Caála	1

Final; Mon, 11 Nov 2013
Mon, 11 Nov 2013
Petro de Luanda	1
Desportivo Huíla	0

== Preliminary rounds ==
Wed, 10 Jul 2013 R32	ASA	0–1	Norberto Castro	Luanda
15:00 WAT (UTC+1)			Kandu 35'	Stadium: Estádio da Cidadela

Wed, 14 Aug 2013 R32	Académica Soyo	2–2 (a.e.t.) (4–3 p)	1º de Maio	Soyo
15:00 WAT (UTC+1)				Stadium: Estádio dos Imbondeiros

== Round of 16 ==
Wed, 2 Oct 2013 R16	1º de Agosto	2–3	Petro Luanda	Luanda
15:00 WAT (UTC+1)	Guilherme 44' (yellow card) 90+3'; Kalulika (yellow card) 66'; Freddy 80'	Report	37' Job; 62' 43' Keita; (yellow card) 90+4' Jotabé	Stadium: 11 de Novembro; Attendance: 8.000; Referee: Pedro dos Santos; Inácio Cândido, Júlio Lemos

Wed, 2 Oct 2013 R16	Santos FC	0–1	Benfica Luanda	Luanda
15:00 WAT (UTC+1)			(yellow card) 60' Danny; 75' Béu; (yellow card) 90' Guilherme	Stadium: Coqueiros; Referee: Venâncio de Matos; Judith Mestre, Bernabé Ngulo

Wed, 2 Oct 2013 R16	Interclube	1–1 (a.e.t.) (5–4 p)	Progresso	Luanda
15:00 WAT (UTC+1)	B. Faye 47'	Report	37' Ito	Stadium: 22 de Junho; Attendance: 1.000; Referee: Paulo Talaia; Ricardo Daniel, Joaquim Paulino
	Penalties
	Pirolito (penalty scored); Paty (penalty scored); Fabrício (penalty scored); B. Faye (penalty scored); Castro (penalty missed)		(penalty scored) Dione; (penalty scored) Calú; (penalty scored) Jaime; (penalty missed) Ito; (penalty missed) Vozinha

Wed, 2 Oct 2013 R16	Sagrada Esperança	0–1	Bravos Maquis	Dundo
15:00 WAT (UTC+1)		Report	(yellow card) 15' (goal) 12' Joca; (yellow card) 49' (yellow-red card) 56' Paizinho	Stadium: Sagrada Esperança; Attendance: 5.000; Referee: Manuel Francisco

Wed, 2 Oct 2013 R16	Desportivo Huíla	Walkover	Atlético Namibe	Lubango
15:00 WAT (UTC+1)				Stadium: Estádio do Ferrovia
Note: Walkover win

Wed, 2 Oct 2013 R16	Norberto Castro	Walkover	Académica Soyo	Luanda
15:00 WAT (UTC+1)				Stadium: Coqueiros
Note: Walkover win

Wed, 28 Aug 2013 R16	Porcelana FC	0–1	Rec do Libolo	N'dalatando
15:00 WAT (UTC+1)		Report	40' Vado	Stadium: Santos Diniz

Wed, 2 Oct 2013 R16	Kabuscorp	0–1	Rec da Caála	Luanda
16:00 WAT (UTC+1)		Report	41' Boka; (yellow card) 60' Projecto; (yellow card) 66' Vovó	Stadium: 11 de Novembro; Attendance: 5.000; Referee: João Goma; Sebastião da Silva, Luís Sá Miranda

== Quarter-finals ==
Wed, 23 Oct 2013 QF	Petro Luanda	1–0	Benfica Luanda	Luanda
15:00 WAT (UTC+1)	Gilberto 39'; Mano (yellow card) 44'	Report		Stadium: 11 de Novembro; Referee: João Goma; Inácio Cândido e Júlio Lemos

Wed, 23 Oct 2013 QF	Interclube	1–0	Bravos Maquis	Luanda
15:00 WAT (UTC+1)	Moco 66' (yellow card); Paty (yellow card); Nuno (yellow card); Manucho (yellow card); Castro (yellow card)	Report	(yellow card) Benvindo	Stadium: 22 de Junho; Referee: Pedro dos Santos; Sebastião da Silva, Miguel Luvumbo

Wed, 23 Oct 2013 QF	Desportivo Huíla	2–0	Norberto Castro	Lubango
15:00 WAT (UTC+1)	Sidney (yellow card) 43' (goal) 63'; Capuco 81'; Ady (yellow card) 67'	Report	(yellow card) 67' Beto; (yellow card) 43' Gui	Stadium: 11 de Novembro; Attendance: 1.000; Referee: Paulo Talaya, Ricardo Catchicume, Joaquim Chio

Wed, 23 Oct 2013 QF	Rec do Libolo	0–1	Rec da Caála	Calulo
15:00 WAT (UTC+1)		Report	(yellow card) 36' (goal) 89' Gueye; (yellow card) 81' Campos; (yellow card) 90' Estévão	Stadium: Municipal de Calulo; Referee: Romualdo Baltazar; Wilson Ntyamba, Rosário Cassinda

== Semi-finals ==
Wed, 6 Nov 2013 SF	Interclube	2–3	Petro Luanda	Luanda
15:00 WAT (UTC+1)	B. Faye 25'; Pirolito (yellow card) 35'; Moco 40'; Bebé (yellow card) 57'; Paty (yellow card) 72'; Nuno (red card) 90+1'	Report	15' 31' Keita; (yellow card) 40' (goal) 90+3' Gilberto; (yellow card) 60' Mabiná	Stadium: 22 de Junho; Referee: Pedro dos Santos; Júlio Lemos, Inácio Cândido

Wed, 6 Nov 2013 SF	Desportivo Huíla	3–1	Rec da Caála	Lubango
15:00 WAT (UTC+1)	Ruffin 38'; Capuco 46'; Chiquinho 63'	Report	3' Caranga; (yellow card) Vovó; (yellow card) Mangualde	Stadium: 11 de Novembro; Attendance: 4.000; Referee: Osvaldo Félix; José Félix, Rosário Pedro

== Final ==
Mon, 11 November 2013
16:00

Petro de Luanda	1–0	Desportivo da Huíla
Keita 50'	Report

Estádio 11 de Novembro, Luanda
Attendance: 10,000
Referee: Paulo Talaya

Petro	Desportivo

GK	12	(Angola) Jotabé
RB	2	(Angola) Loló	(substituted off) 90+2'
CB	7	(Cameroon) Etah
CB	15	(Portugal) Borges
LB	34	(Angola) Eddie
RM	21	(Angola) Mabiná
CM	8	(Angola) Chara (c)
CM	10	(Angola) Gilberto
LM	23	(Angola) Nari	(substituted off) 87'
CF	11	(Angola) Job
CF	20	(Senegal) Keita	(substituted off) 76'
Substitutions:
FW	19	(Senegal) Ben Traoré	(substituted on) 76'
MF	5	(Angola) Osório	(substituted on) 87'
FW	16	(Angola) Flávio	(substituted on) 90+2'
Manager:
(Portugal) José Dinis

GK	1	(Angola) Tony	(yellow card) 77'
RB	4	(Angola) Kumaca
CB	13	(Angola) Chiwe (c)
CB	26	(Democratic Republic of the Congo) Ali
LB	2	(Angola) Ady
RM	6	(Angola) Celson
CM	12	(Angola) Capuco
CM	21	(Angola) Lito
LM	25	(Democratic Republic of the Congo) Ruffin		(substituted off) 69'
CF	17	(Angola) Bena	(yellow card) 27'
CF	23	(Angola) Chiquinho		(substituted off) 75'
Substitutions:
MF	8	(Brazil) Sidney		(substituted on) 69'
MF	11	(Democratic Republic of the Congo) Jiresse		(substituted on) 75'
Manager:
(Angola) Mário Soares

Assistant referees:
Pedro Kanombo
Ricardo Daniel

2013 Angola Football Cup winner

10th title

Squad:
Jotabé, Lamá, Mig, Nelson (GK)
Abdul, Bastos, Borges, Cassoma, Eddie, Etah, Isaac, Loló, Lumeca, Mabiná, Mira (DF)
Buá, Chara, Dany, Diógenes, Gilberto, Job, Mano, Nari, Osório (MF)
Acheampong, Ben Traoré, Filhão, Flávio, Kembua, Ladji Keita, Lelo, (FW)
José Dinis (Head Coach)

== See also ==
- 2013 Girabola
- 2014 Angola Super Cup
- 2014 CAF Confederation Cup
- Petro de Luanda players
- Desportivo da Huíla players
