= Supertaça de Angola =

- Founded: 1982
- Region: Angola
- Current champions: Sagrada Esperança (2020–21)
- Most championships: Primeiro de Agosto (9 titles)
- 2025 Angola Super Cup

The Angolan football Super Cup is a single-match competition in Angolan football, played between the Angolan league champion and the Angola Cup winner. In case the same team happens to win both the league and the cup, the match will be played between the league winner and the cup runner-up.

The Super Cup match marks the beginning of the football season, followed by the league and the cup.

== Match details ==
1985 1º de Maio bt Ferroviário Huíla
1–0 4–1

Sun, 24 Nov 1985	1º de Maio	1–0	Ferroviário Huíla	Coqueiros, Luanda
15:00	Moisés 1'			Referee: Pereira Lopes

Sun, 1 Dec 1985	Ferroviário Huíla	1–4	1º de Maio	Coqueiros, Luanda
15:00	Barbosa 27'		12' Águas; 22' Vicy; 52', 88' Zandú	Referee: Sebastião Reis

1986 Inter de Luanda bt Petro de Luanda
1–0 1–0

Wed, 21 Oct 1987	Petro de Luanda	0–1	Inter de Luanda	Coqueiros, Luanda
15:00			85' Mingo

Wed, 28 Oct 1987	Inter de Luanda	1–0	Petro de Luanda	Coqueiros, Luanda
15:00	Mingo

1988 Petro de Luanda bt Ferroviário Huíla
1–0 1–2

Wed, 10 Feb 1988	Petro de Luanda	1–0	Ferroviário Huíla	Coqueiros, Luanda
15:00	Abel 21'			Referee: Silva Cardoso Macenas

Mon, 15 Feb 1988	Ferroviário Huíla	2–1	Petro de Luanda	Lubango
15:00	Ndisso; Barbosa		Saavedra	Referee: Joaquim Oliveira; João Gonçalves, João Mavunza

1992 1º de Agosto bt Petro de Luanda
1–0 2–1

Sun, 16 Feb 1992	1º de Agosto	1–0	Petro de Luanda	Cidadela Desportiva, Luanda
15:00	Loth 30'			Referee: Jorge Mário Fernandes; Jacinto Félix, Diogo Ferreira

Sun, 23 Feb 1992	Petro de Luanda	1–2	1º de Agosto	Cidadela Desportiva, Luanda
15:00	C.Dinis		Loth

1993 Petro de Luanda bt 1º de Agosto
1–1 2–2

Sun, 18 Apr 1993	Petro de Luanda	1–1	1º de Agosto	Cidadela Desportiva, Luanda
15:00	C.Dinis 62'		28' Ndisso	Referee: Augusto Silva; Roberto Talaia, Luciano António

Sun, 2 May 1993	1º de Agosto	2–2 (a.e.t.) (3–5 p)	Petro de Luanda	Cidadela Desportiva, Luanda
15:00	Ndisso 26'; Nelo 90+6'		41' Nelo Bumba; 90+3' Paulito	Referee: Jorge Mário Fernandes; Domingos Tomás, Silva
	Penalties
	Teófilo (penalty scored); Velho (penalty scored); Kiss (penalty scored); Mbila (penalty missed)		(penalty scored) Felito; (penalty scored) Amaral; (penalty scored) Valente; (penalty scored) Rosário; (penalty scored) Clarindo

1994 Petro Luanda bt ASA
0–0 1–0

Sun, 13 Mar 1994	ASA	0–0	Petro de Luanda	Cidadela Desportiva, Luanda
15:30

Sun, 20 Mar 1994	Petro de Luanda	1–0	ASA	Cidadela Desportiva, Luanda
15:30	Paulito 66'

1995 Independente bt Petro Luanda
3–3 0–0 1–0

Wed, 3 May 1995	Petro de Luanda	3–3	Independente SC	Cidadela Desportiva, Luanda
15:00	Amaral 27', 78'; Kabongó 42' (pen.)		5' Lopes; 80', 86' (pen.) Tostão

	Independente SC	0–0	Petro de Luanda	Joaquim Morais, Namibe
15:00

	Petro de Luanda	0–1	Independente SC	Cidadela Desportiva, Luanda
15:00

1996 ASA bt Petro Luanda
1–1 4–2

	Petro de Luanda	1–1	ASA	Cidadela Desportiva, Luanda
15:00	Nelo Bumba 65'		69' Ab. Amaral

	ASA	4–2	Petro de Luanda	Cidadela Desportiva, Luanda
15:00	B. Carmelino 25'; Yandá 51'; Didí 65'; Ab. Amaral 87' (pen.)		36' Zezinho (o.g.) Didí

1997 1º de Agosto bt Progresso
1–1 1–0

Tue, 4 Feb 1997	Progresso	1–1	1º de Agosto	Cidadela Desportiva, Luanda
15:00	Bendinha 40'		81' Neto

Wed, 9 Apr 1997	1º de Agosto	1–0	Progresso	Cidadela Desportiva, Luanda
15:00	Makita			Referee: Oliveira Pinto; Afonso Tomás, Elísio Francisco

1998 1º de Agosto bt Petro de Luanda
0–0 1–0

Wed, 18 Mar 1998	Petro de Luanda	0–0	1º de Agosto	Cidadela Desportiva, Luanda
15:00				Referee: Augusto Silva

Sat, 28 Mar 1998	1º de Agosto	1–0	Petro de Luanda	Cidadela Desportiva, Luanda
15:00	Assis 62' (pen.)			Referee: Eugénio Colembi; Vieira Cachupo, Paulo Saturnino

1999 1º de Agosto bt Petro de Luanda
2–2 4–0

Thu, 25 Nov 1999	1º de Agosto	2–2	Petro de Luanda	Cidadela Desportiva, Luanda
15:00	Dé 19'; Moisés 78'		67' Aurélio; 83' Zico	Referee: Leopoldo Mavunza; Adão Simão, Manuel Pinto

Sun, 28 Nov 1999	Petro de Luanda	0–4	1º de Agosto	Cidadela Desportiva, Luanda
15:00			7', 90' Isaac; 51' Dé; 80' Muanza	Referee: Augusto Silva; Inácio António, Adalberto Nascimento

2000 1º de Agosto bt Sagrada
0–0 3–0

Wed, 26 Jan 2000	Sagrada Esperança	0–0	1º de Agosto	Quintalão, Dundo
15:00

Sun, 30 Jan 2000	1º de Agosto	3–0	Sagrada Esperança	Cidadela Desportiva, Luanda
15:00	Moisés 36', 70'; Isaac 55'			Attendance: 10.000

2001 Interclube bt Petro de Luanda
1–1 1–0

Thu, 1 Mar 2001	Petro de Luanda	1–1	Interclube	Cidadela Desportiva, Luanda
15:30	Betinho 15'		Patrick 45'	Referee: Augusto Silva

Sun, 4 Mar 2001	Interclube	1–0	Petro de Luanda	Cidadela Desportiva, Luanda
15:30	Papi 41'			Referee: Oliveira Pinto

2002 Petro de Luanda bt Sonangol
5–1 1–1

Sun, 17 Feb 2002	Sonangol	1–5	Petro de Luanda	Joaquim Morais, Namibe
15:30	Bota (pen.)		Flávio 62'; Adolfo 82'; Zico	Referee: José de Sousa

Wed, 20 Feb 2002	Petro de Luanda	1–1	Sonangol	Cidadela Desportiva, Luanda
15:30	Betinho 46'		Olavo 35'	Referee: Frederico Cachiquengue

2003 ASA bt Petro de Luanda
1–1 5–4 (p)

Thu, 6 Feb 2003	Petro de Luanda	1–1	ASA	Cidadela Desportiva, Luanda
15:30	Flávio 70'	Report	Malamba 16'	Attendance: 25.000; Referee: Domingos Pedro; Vicente Garcia, Denilson Gourgel

Sat, 8 Feb 2003	ASA	0–0 (a.e.t.) (5–4 p)	Petro de Luanda	Cidadela Desportiva, Luanda
15:30		Report		Attendance: 30.000; Referee: Luís M. João, Zeverino Muandae, Pedro Mussungo

2004 ASA bt Interclube
4–1 2–0

Wed, 4 Feb 2004	Interclube	1–4	ASA	Cidadela Desportiva, Luanda
15:30	George 28'	Report	Jamba 35'; Kadima 75', 80'; Humberto 90'	Attendance: 5.000; Referee: Eugênio Colembi

Sun, 8 Feb 2004	ASA	2–0	Interclube	Cidadela Desportiva, Luanda
15:30	Kadima 6'; Humberto 46'			Attendance: 1.000; Referee: Domingos Pedro

2005 ASA bt Sonangol
3–1 2–0

Fri, 4 Feb 2005	ASA	3–1	Sonangol	Cidadela Desportiva, Luanda
16:00	Rats 45'; Kadima 73'; Love 88'	Report	Capick 13'	Attendance: 3.000

Sun, 6 Feb 2005	Sonangol	0–2	ASA	Joaquim Morais, Namibe
15:30			Rasca; Love

2006 ASA bt Sagrada Esperança
0–0 2–1

Tue, 14 Feb 2006	ASA	0–0	Sagrada Esperança	Cidadela Desportiva, Luanda
16:00		Report		Attendance: 3.000; Referee: Romualdo Baltazar

Wed, 22 Feb 2006	Sagrada Esperança	1–2	ASA	Estádio 1º de Maio, Malanje **
16:00	Yemeni 63'	Report	Love 46' (pen.); Alex 92' (o.g.)	Attendance: 3.500; Referee: Venâncio de Matos; Alberto Fio, Eurico Vicesse
Note: Sagrada played their home game in Malanje due to the ongoing rehabilitation of its own stadium

2007 Benfica de Luanda bt 1º de Agosto
1–3 1–2 * 1º de Agosto fielded an ineligible player

Wed, 31 Jan 2007	Benfica de Luanda	Annulled (originally 1–3)	1º de Agosto	Coqueiros, Luanda
18:00	Serge 14' (pen.)		Milanzi 4', 51'; Bena 86'	Referee: Venâncio Matos
Note: Benfica de Luanda was declared winner as 1º de Agosto fielded an ineligible player

Sun, 4 Feb 2007	1º de Agosto	Annulled (originally 2–1)	Benfica de Luanda	Coqueiros, Luanda
18:00	Danny 5'; Joãozinho 85' (pen.)	Report	Vado 69'
Note: Benfica de Luanda was declared winner as 1º de Agosto fielded an ineligible player

2008 Interclube bt 1º de Maio
1–0 2–1

Thu, 21 Feb 2008	1º de Maio	0–1	Interclube	Edelfride Costa, Benguela
16:00		Report	Bumba 66'	Referee: Venâncio Matos

Sun, 24 Feb 2008	Interclube	2–1	1º de Maio	22 de Junho, Luanda
15:30	Mingo 29'; Minguito 93'		Zezinho 11'

2009 Santos FC bt Petro de Luanda
2–0 1–2

Wed, 4 Feb 2009	Santos FC	2–0	Petro de Luanda	Coqueiros, Luanda
16:00	Zezão 2'; Manucho Barros 42'	Report		Referee: Pedro dos Santos; Júlio Lemos, Denilson Gourgel

Sat, 7 Feb 2009	Petro de Luanda	2–1	Santos FC	Cidadela Desportiva, Luanda
15:30	David 22'; Chara 87'	Report	Buá 57'	Referee: Romualdo Baltazar

2010 1º de Agosto bt Petro de Luanda
2–1 1–1

Thu, 4 Feb 2010	1º de Agosto	2–1	Petro de Luanda	Cidadela Desportiva, Luanda
16:00	Danny 18', 31'	Report	Nelo 61'	Attendance: 30.000; Referee: Romualdo Baltazar; Júlio Lemos, Wilson Ntyamba

Sun, 7 Feb 2010	Petro de Luanda	1–1	1º de Agosto	Cidadela Desportiva, Luanda
16:00	Job 9'	Report	Danny 91'	Attendance: 25.000; Referee: Pedro dos Santos; Pedro Canombo, Jerson Emiliano

2011 ASA bt Interclube
0–0 1–0

Wed, 2 Mar 2011	Interclube	0–0	ASA	Cidadela Desportiva, Luanda
16:00		Report		Attendance: 1.800; Referee: Manuel Francisco

Sun, 6 Mar 2011	ASA	1–0	Interclube	Cidadela Desportiva, Luanda
16:00	Bokungu´ 68'	Report		Attendance: 2.200; Referee: Pedro dos Santos; Júlio Lemos, Jerson Emiliano

2012 Interclube bt Rec do Libolo
1–0 1–1

Thu, 23 Feb 2012	Rec do Libolo	0–1	Interclube	Patrice Lumumba, Calulo
16:00			Fabrício 56'	Referee: Manuel Francisco; Inácio Cândido, Luís Mateus

Sun, 26 Feb 2012	Interclube	1–1	Rec do Libolo	22 de Junho, Luanda
16:00	Daniel´ 78'	Report	C.Caputo 82'	Attendance: 4.000; Referee: Romualdo Baltazar

2013 Petro de Luanda bt Rec do Libolo
1–0 1–1

Wed, 20 Feb 2013	Petro de Luanda	1–0	Rec do Libolo	11 de Novembro, Luanda
16:00	Job´ 88' (pen.)	Report		Attendance: 15.000; Referee: Paulo Talaya; Wilson Ntyamba, Inácio Cândido

Sun, 24 Feb 2013	Rec do Libolo	1–1	Petro de Luanda	Patrice Lumumba, Calulo
16:00	Dário 63'	Report	Job 87'

2014 Kabuscorp bt Petro de Luanda
3–1

Tue, 4 Feb 2014	Kabuscorp	3–1	Petro de Luanda	11 de Novembro, Luanda
16:00	Meyong´ 44', 56'; Trésor 62'	Report	Gilberto 40'	Attendance: 50.000; Referee: António Caxala; Jerson Emiliano, Wilson Ntyamba

2015 Rec do Libolo bt Benfica de Luanda
4–2 (p)

Wed, 18 Feb 2015	Rec do Libolo	0–0 (a.e.t.) (4–2 p)	Benfica de Luanda	Coqueiros, Luanda
16:00		Report		Attendance: 3.800; Referee: Rodrigues Aleixo; Jerson Emiliano, Wilson Ntyamba
	Penalties
	Mingo (penalty missed); Rudy (penalty scored); Chico (penalty scored); Fredy (penalty scored); Wíres (penalty scored)		(penalty scored) Adawa; (penalty scored) Miguel; (penalty missed) Amaro; (penalty missed) Gomito

2016 Rec do Libolo bt Bravos do Maquis
6–0

Sun, 7 Feb 2016	Rec do Libolo	6–0	Bravos do Maquis	Coqueiros, Luanda
16:00	Fredy 20'; Sidnei 28'; Kuagica 58'; Brito 63'; Phellype 82'; Erivaldo 89'	Report		Attendance: 2.700; Referee: Benjamin Andrade; Abel Ngulo, Judith Mestre

2017 1º de Agosto bt Rec do Libolo
1–0

Sat, 4 Feb 2017	1º de Agosto	1–0	Rec do Libolo	Coqueiros, Luanda
15:30	Geraldo 2'			Attendance: 6,000; Referee: João Ngoma; Júlio Lemos, Rosário Cassinda

2018 1º de Agosto vs Petro de Luanda
Cancelled

Sun, 4 Feb 2018	1º de Agosto	Cancelled	Petro de Luanda	11 de Novembro, Luanda
16:00

2019–20 1º de Agosto bt Desp da Huíla
0–1 2–0

Fri, 2 Aug 2019	Desp da Huíla	1–0	1º de Agosto	Estádio do Ferrovia, Lubango
15:30	Manico 45+1'	Report		Referee: João Goma; José Felix, Dário Gaspar

Mon, 5 Aug 2019	1º de Agosto	2–0	Desp da Huíla	11 de Novembro, Luanda
18:50	Ary Papel 40' (pen.); Lionel 85'			Referee: António Cachala; Ivanildo Lopes, António Sylia

2021–22 Sagrada bt Petro de Luanda
0–0 4–3 (p)

Sun, 26 Sep 2021	Sagrada Esperança	0–0 (4–3 p)	Petro de Luanda	Estádio Nacional de Ombaka, Benguela
15:30		Report		Referee: Bernardo Nangolo; António Pitra, Pedro Alberto
	Penalties
	Carlinhos (penalty scored); Lomalisa (penalty scored); Jó Paciência (penalty scored); Luís Tati (penalty missed); Gaspar (penalty missed); Cachi (penalty scored)		(penalty scored) Azulão; (penalty scored) Yano; (penalty missed) Tó Carneiro; (penalty missed) Megue; (penalty scored) Érico; (penalty missed) Jaredi

== Performance by club ==
Pos	Club	Winners	Runners-up	Winning years	Runner-up years
1	1º de Agosto	9	2	1991, 1992, 1997, 1998, 1999, 2000, 2010, 2017, 2019–20	1993, 2007
2	Petro de Luanda	6	11	1988, 1993, 1994, 2002, 2013	1991, 1992, 1995, 1996, 1998, 1999, 2001, 2003, 2009, 2010, 2014
3	ASA	6	1	1996, 2003, 2004, 2005, 2006, 2011	1994
4	Interclube	4	2	1986, 2001, 2008, 2012	2004, 2011
5	Recreativo do Libolo	2	2	2015, 2016	2012, 2013
6	Sagrada Esperança	1	2	2021–22	2000, 2006
7	Benfica de Luanda	1	1	2007	2015
7	1º de Maio	1	1	1986	2008
9	Kabuscorp	1	–	2014	–
9	Santos F.C.	1	–	2009	–
9	Independente (Tômbwa)	1	–	1995	–
12	Sonangol do Namibe	–	2	–	2002, 2005
13	Bravos do Maquis	–	1	–	2016
13	Progresso do Sambizanga	–	1	–	1997
13	Ferroviário da Huíla	–	1	–	1988

== Managers ==
Year	Date	Club	Coach
1985		Primeiro de Maio	(Angola) Rui Rodrigues
1986		Interclube	(Angola) Joca Santinho
1987		Petro de Luanda	(Brazil) Antônio Clemente
1988		Petro de Luanda	(Brazil) Antônio Clemente
1991		1º de Agosto	(Serbia) Dušan Condić
1992		1º de Agosto	(Serbia) Dušan Condić
1993		Petro de Luanda	(Serbia) Gojko Zec
1994		Petro de Luanda	(Serbia) Gojko Zec
1995		Independente (Tômbwa)	(Angola) António Lopes Chiby
1996		ASA	(Angola) João Machado
1997		1º de Agosto	(Serbia) Dušan Condić
1998		1º de Agosto	(Angola) Ndunguidi Daniel
1999		1º de Agosto	(Angola) Ndunguidi Daniel
2000		1º de Agosto	(Angola) Ndunguidi Daniel

Year	Date	Club	Coach
2001	Feb 5/Mar 4	Interclube	(Brazil) Itamar Amorim
2002	Feb 17/20	Petro de Luanda	(Brazil) José Roberto Ávila
2003	Feb 6/8	ASA	(Portugal) Bernardino Pedroto
2004	Feb 4/8	ASA	(Portugal) Bernardino Pedroto
2005	Feb 4/7	ASA	(Portugal) Bernardino Pedroto
2006	Feb 14/22	ASA	(Portugal) Bernardino Pedroto
2007	Jan 31/Feb 4	Benfica Luanda	(Angola) Zeca Amaral
2008	Feb 21/24	Interclube	(Brazil) Carlos Mozer
2009	Feb 4/7	Santos FC	(Angola) Mário Calado
2010	Feb 4/7	1º de Agosto	(Serbia) Ljubinko Drulović

Year	Date	Club	Coach
2011	Mar 2/6	ASA	(Portugal) José Dinis
2012	Feb 23/26	Interclube	(Portugal) António Caldas
2013	Feb 20/24	Petro de Luanda	(Angola) Miller Gomes
2014	Feb 4	Kabuscorp	(Bulgaria) Eduard Antranik
2015	Feb 18	Recreativo do Libolo	(France) Sébastien Desabre
2016	Feb 07	Recreativo do Libolo	(Portugal) João Paulo Costa
2017	Feb 04	1º de Agosto	(Angola) Ivo Traça
2018	cancelled		
2018–19	cancelled		
2019–20	Aug 2/5	1º de Agosto	(Bosnia and Herzegovina) Dragan Jović

Year	Date	Club	Coach
2021–22	Sep 26, 2021	Sagrada Esperança	(Angola) Roque Sapiri

== Supertaça de Angola (women's) ==
Season	Date	Winner	Score	Runner-up
1999	Mar 11 '00	Progresso do Sambizanga (Luanda)	2–1	Desportivo da SINA (Luanda)
2000	Mar 17 '01	Desportivo da Expresso (Luanda)	4–1	Progresso do Sambizanga (Luanda)
2002	Feb 8 '03	Progresso do Sambizanga (Luanda)	–	Masilva FC (Luanda)
2009	Mar 7 '10	Progresso do Sambizanga (Luanda)	4–1	Amigas do Mártires (Luanda)

== See also ==
- Taça de Angola
- Girabola
- Women's League
- Supertaça de Angola (basketball)
- Supertaça de Angola (handball)
- Supertaça de Angola (roller hockey)
