= 2010 Angola Super Cup =

1º de Agosto	Petro de Luanda
Taça Angola	Girabola
3	2
- on aggregate

First leg
1º de Agosto	Petro de Luanda
2	1
- Date: 4 February 2010
- Venue: Estádio da Cidadela, Luanda
- Referee: Romualdo Baltazar

Second leg
Petro de Luanda	1º de Agosto
1	1
- Date: 7 February 2010
- Venue: Estádio da Cidadela, Luanda
- Referee: Pedro dos Santos

The 2010 Supertaça de Angola (23rd edition) was contested by Petro de Luanda, the 2009 Girabola champion and Primeiro de Agosto, the 2009 Angola cup winner. On home court, D'Agosto beat Petro 2–1 to secure their 7th title as the away match ended in a draw.

== Match details ==
=== First leg ===
4 February 2010
15:30

1º de Agosto	2–1	Petro de Luanda
Danny 18' 31'	Report	61' Nelo

Estádio da Cidadela, Luanda
Attendance: 30,000
Referee: Romualdo Baltazar

D'Agosto	Petro

GK	1	(Angola) Wilson	(yellow card) 30'
RB	18	(Angola) Elísio	(yellow card) 65'
CB	21	(Angola) Kali	(yellow card) 80'
CB	26	(Angola) Joãozinho (c)	(yellow card) 90'
LB	24	(Angola) João Vala
RM	3	(Angola) Mingo Bile		(substituted off) 84'
CM	15	(Angola) Roger
CM	20	(Angola) Castigo	(yellow card) 10'
LM	29	(Angola) Fofaná		(substituted off) 90+5'
CF	14	(Zambia) Danny
CF	30	(Nigeria) Pascal		(substituted off) 70'
Substitutions:
MF	13	(Angola) Manucho		(substituted in) 70'
MF	28	(Angola) Mano		(substituted in) 84'
MF	25	(Angola) Mendonça		(substituted in) 90+5'
Manager:
(Serbia) Ljubinko Drulović

GK	12	(Democratic Republic of the Congo) Papy
RB	21	(Angola) Mabiná
CB	3	(Angola) Sérgio	(yellow card) 22'
CB	7	(Cameroon) Etah	(yellow card) 27'
LB	19	(Angola) Nuno
RM	6	(Angola) Maurito		(substituted off) 46'
CM	8	(Angola) Chara (c)
CM	14	(Angola) Avex		(substituted off) 46'
LM	23	(Democratic Republic of the Congo) Riddy
CF	20	(Angola) Santana
CF	27	(Angola) David		(substituted off) 55'
Substitutions:
DF	17	(Angola) Jamuana		(substituted in) 46'
DF	20	(Angola) Malamba		(substituted in) 46'
FW	18	(Angola) Nelo		(substituted in) 55'
Manager:
(Portugal) Bernardino Pedroto

Assistant referees:
Júlio Lemos
Wilson Ntyamba
Fourth official:

=== Second leg ===
7 February 2010
15:00

Petro de Luanda	1–1	1º de Agosto
Job 9'	Report	90+1' Danny

Estádio da Cidadela, Luanda
Attendance: 25,000
Referee: Pedro dos Santos

Petro	D'Agosto

GK	1	(Angola) Lamá
RB	21	(Angola) Mabiná
CB	7	(Cameroon) Etah
CB	27	(Angola) Cassoma
LB	30	(Angola) Carlão
RM	11	(Angola) Job	(yellow card) 10'	(substituted off) 75'
CM	6	(Angola) Nelo		(substituted off) 55'
CM	8	(Angola) Chara (c)
LM	19	(Angola) Nuno
CF	16	(Angola) Joka	(yellow card) 54'	(substituted off) 58'
CF	23	(Democratic Republic of the Congo) Riddy
Substitutions:
FW	20	(Angola) Santana		(substituted in) 58'
FW	27	(Angola) David		(substituted in) 61'
FW	18	(Angola) Malamba	(yellow card) 90'	(substituted in) 75'
Manager:
(Portugal) Bernardino Pedroto

GK	1	(Angola) Wilson
RB	18	(Angola) Elísio
CB	21	(Angola) Kali
CB	26	(Angola) Joãozinho (c)
LB	24	(Angola) João Vala
RM	3	(Angola) Mingo Bile		(substituted off) 83'
CM	15	(Angola) Roger
CM	20	(Angola) Castigo	(yellow card) 39'	(substituted off) 80'
LM	29	(Angola) Fofaná	(yellow card) 89'	(substituted off) 90+4'
CF	14	(Zambia) Danny
CF	30	(Nigeria) Pascal	(yellow card) 82'
Substitutions:
MF	13	(Angola) Manucho		(substituted in) 80'
MF	28	(Angola) Mano		(substituted in) 83'
DF	5	(Angola) Dani		(substituted in) 90+4'
Manager:
(Serbia) Ljubinko Drulović

Assistant referees:
Pedro Canombo
Jerson Emiliano
Fourth official:
Hélder Martins

2010 Angola Football Super Cup winner

Clube Desportivo Primeiro de Agosto
7th title

Squad: Bena, Bolingó, Castigo, Chileshe, Dani, Danny, Elísio, Fofaná, J.Martins, J.Vala, Joãozinho, Kali, Kumaca, Love, Mano, Manucho, Mendonça, M.Bile, M.Sanda, Pascal, Patrick, Roger, Rubian, Sangala, Stélvio, Tony, Wilson
Head coach: Ljubinko Drulović

== See also ==
- 2009 Girabola
- 2009 Angola Cup
- Primeiro de Agosto players
- Petro de Luanda players
