= 2021–22 Angola Super Cup =

Supertaça de Angola 2021–22
Sagrada Esperança	Petro de Luanda
Girabola	Taça Angola
0 (4)	0 (3)
- Date: September 26, 2021
- Venue: Estádio Nacional de Ombaka, Benguela
- Referee: Bernardo Nangolo
- Attendance: 5,000

The 2021–22 Supertaça de Angola (31st edition) was contested by Sagrada Esperança, the 2020–21 Girabola champion and Petro de Luanda, the 2020–21 Angola Cup winner. Sagrada Esperança won the match, making it its 1st super cup win.

== Match details ==
26 September 2021
15:30

Sagrada Esperança	0–0	Petro de Luanda
	Report
Penalties
Carlinhos (penalty scored); Lomalisa (penalty scored); Jó Paciência (penalty scored); Luís Tati (penalty missed); Gaspar (penalty missed); Cachi (penalty scored)	4–3	(penalty scored) Azulão; (penalty scored) Yano; (penalty missed) Tó Carneiro; (penalty missed) Megue; (penalty scored) Érico; (penalty missed) Jaredi

Estádio Nacional de Ombaka, Benguela
Attendance: 6,000
Referee: Bernardo Nangolo

Sagrada	Petro

GK	12	(Angola) Langanga
RB	23	(Angola) Victoriano	(yellow card) 26'	(substituted off) 75'
CB	6	(Angola) Gaspar (c)
CB	25	(Angola) Lulas
LB	22	(Democratic Republic of the Congo) Lomalisa
RW	26	(Angola) Água Doce		(substituted off) 80'
DM	20	(Angola) Luís Tati	(yellow card) 90+2'
CM	10	(Angola) Carlinhos
LW	30	(Angola) Adó Pena		(substituted off) 61'
CF	16	(Angola) Lépua		(substituted off) 61'
CF	29	(Angola) Depú
Substitutions:
MF	14	(Angola) Matengó		(substituted on) 61'
MF	21	(Angola) Cachi		(substituted on) 61'
MF	18	(Angola) Messias		(substituted on) 75'
MF	8	(Angola) Celso		(substituted on) 80'
Manager:
(Angola) Roque Sapiri

GK	22	(Angola) Mualucano	(yellow card) 18'
RB	2	(Angola) Diógenes
CB	4	(Portugal) Pedro Pinto
CB	18	(Angola) Vidinho		(substituted on) 55'
LB	13	(Angola) Tó Carneiro
RW	37	(Angola) Maya
DM	5	(Brazil) Soares		(substituted on) 68'
CM	8	(Angola) Dany	(yellow card) 44'	(substituted on) 55'
LW	11	(Angola) Job (c)		(substituted on) 85'
CF	26	(Brazil) Azulão
CF	29	(Angola) Jaredi
Substitutions:
CB	24	(Angola) Quinito		(substituted on) 55'
FW	9	(Angola) Yano		(substituted on) 55'
MF	14	(Angola) Megue		(substituted on) 68'
MF	27	(Portugal) Érico		(substituted on) 85'
Manager:
(Portugal) Alexandre Santos

Assistant referees:
António Pitra
Pedro Alberto
Fourth official:

2021–22 Angola Super Cup winner

1st title

Squad:
Gerson, Langanga, Leonardo (GK)
Caranga, Gaspar, Lomalisa, Lulas, Simão, Victoriano (DF)
Água Doce, Cachi, Carlinhos, Celson, Femi, Lépua, Luís Tati, Manguxi, Messias, Muenho, Reginó (MF)
Aníbal, Depú, Jó Paciência, Matengó (FW)
Roque Sapiri (Head Coach)

== See also ==
- 2020–21 Angola Cup
- 2020–21 Girabola
- 2021–22 Petro de Luanda season
