= 2008 Angola Super Cup =

2009 Angola Super Cup
Interclube	Primeiro de Maio
Girabola	Taça Angola
3	1
- on aggregate

First leg
Interclube	Primeiro de Maio
1	0
- Date: 21 February 2008
- Venue: Estádio Edelfride Costa, Benguela
- Referee: Venâncio de Matos

Second leg
Primeiro de Maio	Interclube
1	2
- Date: 24 February 2008
- Venue: Estádio 22 de Junho, Luanda
- Referee: Jorge Magalhães

The 2008 Supertaça de Angola (21st edition) was contested by Interclube, the 2007 Girabola champion and Primeiro de Maio, the 2007 Angola Cup winner. In the away match, Interclube beat Maio 1–0 to secure their 1st title as the 2nd leg home match ended in another win 2-1 win for Interclube.

== Match details ==
=== First leg ===
Thu, 21 February 2008
15:00

Primeiro de Maio	0–1	Interclube
	Report	66' Bumba

Estádio dos Coqueiros, Luanda
Referee: Venâncio de Matos

Maio	Inter

GK	26	(Democratic Republic of the Congo) Lokwa
RB	3	(Angola) Lilí	Substituted off
CB	17	(Angola) Madaque
CB	8	(Angola) Dani
LB	–	(Angola) Marcos
RM	24	(Angola) Tunga
CM	23	(Angola) Hélder
CM	4	(Angola) Sassoma	Substituted off
LM	19	(Angola) Zezinho
CF	15	(Angola) Sting
CF	10	(Angola) Adolfo	Substituted off
Substitutions:
FW	28	(Angola) Fita	Substituted in
MF	–	(Angola) Grau	Substituted in
FW	9	(Angola) Júnior	Substituted in
Manager:
(Angola) Rui Teixeira

GK	12	(Angola) Mário
RB	–	(Angola) Carlos
CB	–	(Angola) Joel
CB	–	(Democratic Republic of the Congo) Wetshi
LB	–	(Angola) Nuno
RM	–	(Angola) Dione
CM	–	(Angola) Gildo	Substituted off
CM	–	(Democratic Republic of the Congo) Kanu
LM	–	(Angola) Nito
CF	–	(Angola) Bumba
CF	–	(Cameroon) Romi	Substituted off
Substitutions:
MF	–	(Angola) Minguito	Substituted in
FW	–	(Angola) Pedro Henriques	Substituted in
Manager:
(Brazil) Carlos Mozer

Assistant referees:

Fourth official:

=== Second leg ===
Sun, 24 February 2008
15:00

Interclube	2–1	Primeiro de Maio
Mingo 29'; Minguito 90+3'		11' Zezinho

Estádio 22 de Junho, Luanda
Referee: Jorge Magalhães

Inter	Maio

GK	–	(Angola)
RB	–	(Angola)
CB	–	(Angola)
CB	–	(Angola)
LB	–	(Angola)
RM	–	(Angola)
CM	–	(Angola)	Substituted off
CM	–	(Angola)
LM	–	(Angola)
CF	–	(Angola)
CF	–	(Angola)	Substituted off
Substitutions:
MF	–	(Angola)	Substituted in
FW	–	(Angola)	Substituted in
Manager:
(Brazil) Carlos Mozer

GK	–	(Angola)
RB	–	(Angola)	Substituted off
CB	–	(Angola)
CB	–	(Angola)
LB	–	(Angola)
RM	–	(Angola)
CM	–	(Angola)
CM	–	(Angola)	Substituted off
LM	–	(Angola)
CF	–	(Angola)
CF	–	(Angola)	Substituted off
Substitutions:
FW	–	(Angola)	Substituted in
MF	–	(Angola)	Substituted in
FW	–	(Angola)	Substituted in
Manager:
(Angola) Rui Teixeira

Assistant referees:

Fourth official:

2008 Angola Football Super Cup winner

Grupo Desportivo Interclube
3rd title

Squad: Aspirina, Bebé, Bumba, Cadez Carlos, Dedas, Dione, Fabrício, Gildo, Joel, Kanu, Kito, Lucas, Mário, Mingo, Minguito, Nito, Nunas, Nuno, Pedro Henriques, Romeo, Romi, Traoré, Wetshi, Yano, Yuri
Head coach: Carlos Mozer

== See also ==
- 2007 Girabola
- 2007 Angola Cup
- Interclube players
- Primeiro de Maio players
