= List of Estrela Clube Primeiro de Maio players =

Estrela Clube Primeiro de Maio is an Angolan football (soccer) club based in Benguela, Angola and plays at Estádio Municipal Edelfride Palhares da Costa. The club was established in 1981.

== 2011–2020 ==
Estrela Clube Primeiro de Maio players 2011–2020

Nat	#	Nick	Name	A	P	F.N.	A.M.	A.T.	A.T.	F.M.	H.T.	H. Teixeira			A. Tramagal			A.S.	Yamba Asha			
Nat	#	Nick	Name	A	P	2011	2012	2013	2014	2015	2016	2017 (10th)			2018 (15th)			2019	2019–20			
Nat	#	Nick	Name	A	P	15	1	13	14	1	15	^{#}	^{A}	^{G}	^{#}	^{A}	^{G}	^{#}	^{#}	^{A}	^{G}	
(Angola)		Abegá	Manuel Pedro Pacavira	29	DF					→	27											
(Angola)		Ady Paulo	Agostinho Domingos Paulo	28	MF							→			6	^{22(1)}	^{0}	→				
(Angola)		Além	Alberto Adão Campos Miguel	20	MF							11	^{2(5)}	^{1}	→							
(Angola)	21	Alexandre Miguel	Alexandre G. Mário Miguel	26	FW				28		28	10	^{9(6)}	^{3}	10	^{5(3)}	^{0}	–	21	^{4(1)}	^{0}	
(Angola)		Andy			DF															^{5}	^{1}	
(Angola)		António Sapalo	Tomás Chiombo Cambuque Sapalo	22	DF							→			3	^{4}	^{0}					
(Democratic Republic of the Congo)		Apataki	Patrick Kifu Apataki	37	FW						–											
(Angola)		Ayala	Mário Álvaro Agostinho	31	MF				–									→	10	^{2}	^{0}	
(Angola)		Bartolo	Bartolomeu Baptista Teng	23	MF							23	^{7(2)}	^{1}	23	^{4(3)}	^{0}	18	→			
(Angola)		Bebé								–												
(Angola)	22	Bebo			MF													22	22	^{4}	^{0}	
(Angola)		Bebucho Domingos	João Domingos	22	MF										13	^{(1)}	^{0}					
(Cameroon)		Bernabé													13	^{2(1)}	^{0}					
(Angola)		Bernardo									24											
(Democratic Republic of the Congo)	27	Bokungu	Carlos Mafu Musseke	31	FW													–	27	^{9(1)}	^{1}	
(Angola)	1	Boneco	Manuel Pilartes Sambambi		GK	2011		30	→	–	1	→						→	1	^{6}	^{0}	
(Angola)		Boss	Joaquim José Candiza		DF													→	26	^{2(5)}	^{0}	→
(Angola)		Brazuca	Walter Inácio Furtado Vieira	30	MF						→	16	^{22}	^{0}	16	^{15}	^{1}	→				
(Angola)	6	Bruno			DF														6	^{9}	^{0}	
(Angola)	16	Bruno Manuel	Domingos Lunga M. Manuel	25	FW							→			17	^{1(2)}	^{0}	–	16	^{7(1)}	^{0}	→
(Angola)		Bug Jass	Simão da Costa Bartolomeu	26	MF			14	14	⋅	4	14	^{10}	^{3}	→							
(Angola)		Bugos	Roandro Ivan da Fonseca Semedo		MF	2011	→	25	→													
(Angola)		Bumba	Pedro António da Costa	32	DF							17	^{2(5)}	^{0}								
(Angola)		Cabetula	Sabalo José Kilulo Ingo		DF				–													
(Angola)		Calala	Wilson Quizanga Esteves		DF	2011																
(Angola)		Calú	José Sesoko da Silva Calei	21	MF							→			11	^{5(4)}	^{0}					
(Guinea)		Camará	Henri Camara	27	MF	2011																
(Angola)		Capessa																–				
(Angola)		Capita	Evanilson de Jesus Pedro		FW			2														
(Angola)	9	Cebola Domingos	Pedro Cambengue C. Domingos		FW										→			9	9	^{3(5)}	^{1}	
(Angola)		Chibiké						–														
(Angola)		Chiklay	Francisco Manuel Chimuenho		FW			20		20												
(Angola)		Coimbra	António Coimbra Agostinho		MF	2011	7	7														
(Angola)		Cristiano Quitembo	Cristiano Bernardo Quitembo	30	DF							15	^{11}	^{3}	15	^{13}	^{2}					
(Democratic Republic of the Congo)		Dady Nseye	Kongolo Lusala Makiese Nseye		MF			→	15													
(Cape Verde)		Dany Ribeiro	Dany Mendes Ribeiro	30	MF			–	→	–		13	^{3(1)}	^{0}								
(Angola)		Délcio	Yamba E.A. João	19	DF										5	^{1}	^{0}					
(Angola)		Dilman	Dilman Edvair Furtado Ribeiro	24	FW							→			19	^{4(8)}	^{1}	→				
(Angola)		Dinho Chiteculo	Marcolino Chilombo Chiteculo	32	DF						→	27	^{7}	^{0}								
(Angola)		Dino António	Florentino de Sousa António	26	DF					–	2	→						→	2	^{11}	^{1}	→
(Angola)		Djamini	Francisco Domingos João		MF				10	→												
(Angola)		Djemba Bunga	Gildo Paulo Bunga	31	MF						→	20	^{(5)}	^{1}								
(Cape Verde)		Dy D Mena	Adilson José dos Santos Lopes	30			6	6	→													
(Angola)		Edson Praia	Edson da Graça Calunga Praia	29	DF						5	5	^{9}	^{1}	→							
(Angola)		Edú Pessela	António Lucamba Pessela	22	MF			–	–	–		26	^{9(1)}	^{2}	26	^{7(2)}	^{0}	→				
(Angola)	8	Eduardo			MF				–									–	8	^{5(5)}	^{0}	
(Angola)		Efemberg	José Manuel Catendi		MF		–															
(Angola)		Elber	Jorge Mota Faial Delgado		GK		1	1	→													
(Angola)	14	Eliseu António	Eliseu Domingos M. António		MF					–	8							–	14	^{3(1)}	^{1}	
(Angola)		Elizur	Yamba Elizeu António João	25	DF		–			–	20	→			20	⋅	⋅					
(Angola)		Estória	Sérgio António Luís	24	DF				–													
(Angola)		Etoh									→	18	^{(2)}	^{0}								
(Democratic Republic of the Congo)		Etoh Lumu	Nzalambila Lumu		FW										17	^{5(3)}	^{3}					
(Angola)		Fani	José Afonso dos Santos Fernando	26	GK						→	1	^{10}	^{0}								
(Angola)		Fatite †	Paulo Alcides Raul Camufingo	33	MF						→	19	^{16(1)}	^{3}								
(Angola)		Feliciano Tchissapa	Feliciano Domingos Tchissapa	28	GK				30	30												
(Angola)		Fernandinho			MF						16											
(Angola)		Filhão	João Gomes de Oliveira	21	FW					→	–	→										
(Angola)		Filipe Silva	Israel Kipindi Pacote da Silva	30	FW				23	23	23	→										
(Angola)		Finidi	Luís Domingos Canganjo	27	DF						→	6	^{6}	^{0}								
(Angola)		Fita	Fernando Fita António Francisco		FW	2011																
(Angola)		Francisco							–													
(Angola)		Frank Jimbi	Francisco Barros Jimbi								26	→										
(Angola)	7	Gaúcho	Sadac Daniel Julião Baptista	22	MF						→	12	^{2}	^{0}				7	7	^{1(1)}	^{0}	
(Angola)		Geovane Vaz	Geovane Pedro Vaz	23	MF							→			29	^{1(5)}	^{0}		→			
(Angola)		Gerry	Nsingui Tino João		MF						→	13	^{2}	^{0}	27	^{9}	^{0}					
(Cape Verde)		Gerson Centeio	Adilson Centeio Araújo	28	MF	2011	18	18	19													
(Angola)		Greg																28				
(Angola)		Gui Muhango	Guilherme Alberto Muhango	22	GK							→			1	^{DNP}		1	30	^{7}	^{0}	→
(Angola)		Hélder Soares	Hélder Peliganga Domingos Soares	29	DF	2011	16	16	16	16												
(Angola)		Hélio										20	^{6}	^{0}	20	^{12}	^{0}					
(Cape Verde)		Herman	Herman Delgado Sousa	22	MF				–	→												
(Angola)		Hippi	Domingos Paulo João José		DF				5													
(Angola)		Isaías									9											
(Angola)		Itumba	Osvaldo Lupa				–	–														
(Angola)	11	Izgo	Isaac Paulo Nilinga		FW													→	11	^{4}	^{1}	
(Angola)		Jamanta	Edivaldo Neves Cubo Quinanga	19	MF							→			22	^{4(1)}	^{0}					
(Angola)		Jamba Lourenço	Guilherme C. Lourenço	21	FW						21	21	^{(2)}	^{0}								
(Angola)		Janota	Rui Paulo Caixinha Janota	27	MF						17											
(Angola)		Jepson	António Ngola Ngulo		MF														18	^{2(6)}	^{0}	→
(Angola)		Jó Júnior	Marcos Pedro Júnior	32	DF							27	^{11}	^{0}	27	^{12}	^{2}					
(Angola)		João Love	João Love		FW			–														
(Angola)		Joãozinho			MF			5														
(Angola)	3	Johnson	Joel Sebastião Adão Pascoal	26	DF													→	3	^{1(1)}	^{0}	
(Angola)	12	Jojó Hamuyela	José Cahombo Hamuyela	26	DF													→	12	^{7}	^{2}	
(Angola)		Josielson	Josielson Moraes Silva	24	FW				–													
(Angola)		Kabila	Timóteo Kayeye Sambisca	21	MF							→			18	^{(4)}	^{0}	→				
(Angola)		Kahossi	José Maria Sakutuala	21	DF														28	^{10}	^{0}	→
(Cape Verde)		Kaká Delgado	William Jorge M. Faial Delgado			2011		13														
(Democratic Republic of the Congo)		Kandú	Déo Kanda	28	MF						→	11	^{1(3)}	^{0}								
(Angola)		Kaporal	João Chingando Manha	23	FW						3	3	^{16(6)}	^{12}	→							
(Guinea)		Keita	Aboubacar Keita		DF		4	4														
(Angola)		Kikas Quitumba	Joelson José Domingos Quitumba	26	MF					→	10											
(Angola)		Kiko			GK	→	–	–														
(Angola)		Kilombo	Paulino Joaquim Clemente	27	MF				17	17												
(Angola)		Kito Canganjo	Quintino António Canganjo		DF													5	→			
(Angola)		Kituxi			GK	2011	→	–														
(Angola)		Kizombé	Alberto dos Santos Domingos	23	DF			→	2	→												
(Angola)		Kodak	António Frazão Garcia		MF													–				
(Angola)		Lara Domingos	Manuel Jacinto Domingos	26	DF						→	28	^{12(1)}	^{0}	→							
(Angola)		Laúcha	Ivan Cláudio França Joanes	31	MF						11											
(Angola)	29	Lelas	Adérito Yandelela Chissoca	27	FW	2011		10	→		10								29	^{6(2)}	^{1}	
(Angola)		Leo Zamba	Leonilde Gongo Zamba		GK				→	–	22	→										
(Angola)		Líbero	Quintino Feliciano Pereira		DF	2011																
(Angola)		Lily			DF	2011	17	17														
(Angola)		Lito Firmino	Domingos Lito Firmino	29	DF				–													
(Democratic Republic of the Congo)		Lokwa	Lokwa Mbo Blanchard	28	GK					→	30	→										
(Angola)		Lucas			MF			24														
(Angola)		Luisão			DF	2011	–	–	–													
(Angola)		Madaque	Hélder Fernandes Manuel		DF	2011	→															
(Angola)		Madeira																–				
(Angola)	–	Mahinga																	–	^{(1)}	^{0}	
(Angola)	32	Mailov																	32	^{2}	^{0}	
(Angola)		Mandinho	João Fernando Finda	29	MF					7												
(Angola)		Man Belé					17															
(Angola)		Mano									19											
(Angola)		Márcio Luvambo	Márcio Armando Gonçalves Luvambo	32	MF	2011	→			→	7	7	^{16(1)}	^{1}	7	^{27}	^{6}	→				
(Angola)		Maria Pia	Victor Guilherme Tchyonga	28	MF					→	29	29	^{9(7)}	^{2}	→							
(Angola)		Massinga	Moisés Armando Yango	29	FW					→	9											
(Angola)		Massudi	Antunes Francisco Soares			2011	→															
(Angola)		Mauro, Edson	Edson Mauro				–															
(Angola)		Mauro Almeida					–															
(Angola)	31	Mauro	Mauro Jacinto		GK													–	31	^{(2)}	^{0}	
(Cape Verde)		Mendes Soares	António Mendes Soares		DF													–				
(Angola)		Michel			MF		–	–	–													
(Angola)		Mig	Zacarias dos Milagres Sambambi		GK	2011																
(Angola)		Miguel Manuel	Miguel Alexandre Gomes Manuel	25	MF													–	23	^{7(3)}	^{1}	
(Angola)		Mona	Cipriano Cunha Rafael	25	MF							8	^{8(3)}	^{1}	8	^{25(3)}	^{1}	–				
(Angola)		Moreira	Louter Adérito Haypa	24	GK							→			12	^{7}	^{0}					
(Angola)		Mputo			GK			→	–													
(Angola)		Muenho	Gervásio Domingos Calela	22	DF					–	15	→										
(Angola)		Nanú			DF			→	–													
(Angola)		Ndieu	Ndieu Doune António Massadila	22	DF	2011	→															
(Angola)		Ndó	António Nenuele Nelo	28	FW				–													
(Angola)		Negra	Juremo Filipe Gonçalves	27	MF				8		→	8	^{6(2)}	^{0}								
(Angola)		Nelo			GK					–												
(Angola)		Nelson Antunes	Nelson Francisco Manuel Lobo Antunes		GK							→			30	^{18(1)}	^{0}	→				
(Angola)		Nelson Manuel	Nelson Francisco Manuel						27	27												
(Angola)		Ning	Rodino Dumbo José		MF													17	17	^{11}	^{1}	
(Cameroon)		N'Kendo	Guillaume N'Kendo Tchougang	28	FW				–													
(Angola)		Nuno					–															
(Angola)	5	Oliveira Gonga	Pedro José de Oliveira Gonga	31	DF		23	23	25	→	→	4	^{13}	^{0}				3	5	^{DNP}		
(Angola)		Pai da Bola	Albano Camuele Sumano		FW						25	→										
(Angola)		Paito	Manuel Gaspar Fernandes	30	MF				29													
(Angola)		Pakessa	Camuyela D. Canjunga		MF						→	24	^{8(5)}	^{1}								
(Guinea)		Pandjani	Ahmed Cherif Haidara		DF		11	11														
(Angola)		Panilson	Panilson Javela	25	FW	2011		21	21	→												
(Angola)		Pedy	Benedito C. Dumbo		FW							9	^{14(9)}	^{3}	9	^{10(3)}	^{0}	→				
(Angola)		Pepé			DF			–														
(Angola)		Pick Chivanga	Fernando Katito Chivanga	33	DF	2011	→		24	24	→							–				
(Angola)		Pirolito Mbumba	Henrique Mbumba	21	MF							→			28	^{7(4)}	^{0}					
(Angola)		Pitbull			GK				–													
(Angola)		Poco	Manuel Paulo Víctor	28	DF							→			2	^{18}	^{0}	→				
(Angola)	24	Projecto	Jaime Cotingo Martinho	29	DF													→	24	^{5}	^{0}	
(Angola)		Quinho	Samuel K. Francisco	19	FW							→			21	^{17(3)}	^{4}	→				
(Angola)		Rainho	Pedro António Rainho Gonçalves		FW				–													
(Angola)	13	Renato			DF													–	13	^{1}	^{0}	
(Angola)		Resistência			FW	2011	–	–														
(Ghana)		Richard	Richard Mantey	20	GK							→			14	^{3}	^{0}					
(Angola)	25	Rodrigo	Rodrigo Ndambo Masudi		MF														25	^{13}	^{0}	
(Cape Verde)		Rui Faial	Rui Jorge Rocha Faial Delgado		MF	2011	29	29														
(Angola)		Rui Miguel	Jorge Honésimo Miguel	21	GK						→	22	^{16}	^{0}	→							
(Angola)		Samuel, Zinga	Zinga Samuel		DF			3	→	–												
(Angola)		Sawú	Mazenga Dimanza Garcia	30	FW				20													
(Angola)		Song	Jorge Kahete Dungula	26	DF							→			4	^{20(1)}	^{1}					
(Angola)		Sozito	Mário Bernardo Keita	22	DF										3	^{7}	^{0}	→				
(Angola)		Sucami	João Sucami Nzongo		GK				1													
(Angola)		Sylla	Sylla Moise Pascal		FW	2011		9														
(Angola)		Tashungu	Carlos Tashungu Wungu		DF			→	–													
(Angola)		Telmo	Carlos Pedro Neto	18	FW							→			25	^{6(10)}	^{2}					
(Angola)		Tino Jonas	Faustino Sapalo A. Jonas	24	GK						→	30	^{0}	^{0}								
(Angola)		Tobias Domingos	Bartolomeu de Sousa Domingos		DF				→	–	6	→										
(Angola)		Tony			GK		–															
(Democratic Republic of the Congo)		Tsherry	Thierry Bolongo Ebengi	39	GK						→	30	^{1}	^{0}								
(Angola)		Tucho Cardoso	Edson Orlando Cardoso	24	MF			→	22	→												
(Angola)		Tukurus	Tumba Tukurus Lupa		MF			15														
(Cape Verde)		Vally	Valdevindes Chantres Monteiro	30	DF										15	^{6}	^{0}	→				
(Angola)		Vasco Inácio	Vasco Augusto Inácio	23	DF										24	^{11(1)}	^{0}	–	4	^{13}	^{0}	→
(Angola)		Vemba																–				
(Angola)	15	Vladimir	António Quintas	22	MF														15	^{3}	^{0}	→
(Zambia)		William Chilufya	William Chilufya	28	FW	2011	→															
(Angola)		Yeyé	João Sanda Pedro	27	DF						12	25	^{9(2)}	^{2}								
(Angola)		Zara				2011	–															
Years						2011	2012	2013	2014	2015	2016	2017			2018			2019	2019–20		6	

== 2001–2010 ==
Estrela Clube Primeiro de Maio players 2001–2010

Nat	Nick	Name	A	P	N.Brandão		JAT	F.N.	A.T.	F.N.	R.T.	L.B.	F.N.	–
Nat	Nick	Name	A	P	2001	2002	2003	2004	2005	2006	2007	2008	2009	2010
Nat	Nick	Name	A	P	12	1	8	11	10	13	–	3	3	1
(Democratic Republic of the Congo)	Adolph Mabana	Adolph Boto Mabana		FW						→	2007	10		
(Angola)	Adriano							2004						
(Angola)	Ângelo Lelo	Ângelo da Cruz Lelo Chimpanzo	27	DF					20	→				
(Angola)	Armando Cardoso	Armando Jorge Silva Cardoso	28	MF									2009	→
(Angola)	Avelino Lopes	Avelino Lopes		FW						18				
(Angola)	Baptista, Martins	Martins Baptista	27	DF					–	→				
(Angola)	Baton			MF			2003	2004						
(Angola)	Belinho			DF			2003							
(Angola)	Benício	Benicio Nery Anibal Efrem	22	MF					12	12				
(Angola)	Benjamim			MF				2004	27	27				
(Angola)	Boa							2004	18					
(Guinea-Bissau)	Braima	Braíma Injai	34	MF								→	2009	→
(Angola)	Brandão								11					
(Namibia)	Brian Gurirab	Brian Gurirab	25	MF								2008	2009	
(Angola)	Buta	Pedro Buta		MF				2004	→					
(Angola)	Calala	Wilson Quizanga Esteves		DF				→	2	2	2007	2008	2009	
(Angola)	Caricoco	Paulo José Rodrigues Campos		MF				→	–	→				
(Angola)	Carlão	Carlos Chibena Jamba		DF						–				
(Angola)	Carvalinho						2003	2004						
(Angola)	Celestino						2003							
(Angola)	Coimbra	António Coimbra Agostinho		MF			2003	2004	7	7	2007	2008	2009	
(Angola)	Conceição			DF		2002								
(Angola)	Costa Neto			GK			2003							
(Angola)	Dadá			MF		2002	2003							
(Angola)	Dani Massunguna	Massunguna Alex Afonso	23	MF							2007	24	2009	→
(Angola)	Dedé							2004						
(Brazil)	Derley	Vanderley Dias Marinho	19	FW						33				
(Angola)	Desiré						2003							
(Angola)	Dinho Ventura	Carlos Alberto Ventura		DF					→	35	2007	→		
(Angola)	Djibril	Miguel Ngoi		FW			2003	2004						
(Angola)	Dua							2004						
(Angola)	Edmilson Gomes	Edmilson Manuel Cristovão Gomes		MF							2007	2008		
(Angola)	Edy André	Edilson Roberto Gomes André		MF								2008	2009	
(Angola)	Eric			FW			2003							
(Brazil)	Fabio Vassallo	Fabio Luiz Monte Vassallo	29							–				
(Angola)	Faustino							2004						
(Angola)	Fita	Fernando Fita António Francisco		FW							2007	28	→	
(Angola)	Fity			MF				2004						
(Angola)	Gabriel			DF		2002								
(Angola)	Ganga	Manuel Ngola		MF								2008		
(Cape Verde)	Gerson Araújo	Adilson Centeio Araújo		MF							2007			
(Angola)	Gil Martins	Gil Martins dos Santos	24	MF						→	2007	→		
(Angola)	Girinho	Iracelmo Lopes		DF								2008	2009	
(Angola)	Gonçalves								25					
(Angola)	Grau	Diogo José Mateus Pascoal		DF							→	2008	→	
(Angola)	Gugú						2003							
(Angola)	Guy Luciano	Carlos Alberto da Silva Luciano	32	DF						→	2007	2008	→	
(Guinea-Bissau)	Hélder Có	Hélder Monteiro Có	26	FW								→	2009	→
(Angola)	Hélder Soares	Hélder Peliganga Domingos Soares		DF								23	→	
(Angola)	Hino			MF		2002	2003	2004						
(Angola)	Itewa							2004						
(Angola)	Ito										2007	2008		
(Angola)	Jaburú Avelino	Teófilo Salvador Avelino	31	FW				→	19	→				
(Angola)	Jacó	Hermenegildo Pimentel Bravo da Rosa	31	MF									2009	
(Brazil)	Jadson	Jadson Fernando Costa Carvalho	22	FW						–	2007			
(Angola)	Joaquim Costa	Joaquim Sebastião da Costa								17				
(Angola)	Joaquim Sousa	Joaquim Sebastião de Sousa							17	→				
(Angola)	Jonas	Carlos Romeu		FW				→	6	6				
(Angola)	Jony	Jonico Catumbela Silva						→	24	→				
(Angola)	Jordão Evaristo	Jordão Evaristo							→	28				
(Angola)	Júnior			MF								9	→	
(Angola)	Kivota	Rui Manuel Kivota Cata	30	GK					→	–	2007	→		
(Angola)	Laurentino	Laurentino Jerónimo Fernandes da Cruz	32	GK								→	2009	→
(Angola)	Lebú			DF			2003	2004						
(Angola)	Lilí Gasolina	Hélder Gasolina		DF				2004	3	3	2007	3	2009	
(Democratic Republic of the Congo)	Lokwa	Lokwa Mbo Blanchard	–	GK				2004	26	26	2007	26	2009	→
(Angola)	Lucas							2004						
(Angola)	Luisinho			DF		2002	2003		5					
(Angola)	Lunguinha	António Luís dos Santos Serrado	23	DF								→	2009	
(Angola)	Madaque	Hélder Fernandes Manuel		DF								17	→	
(Angola)	Malagi			GK		2002								
(Angola)	Maninho						2003							
(Angola)	Mano Pinto	Valdimiro de Almeida Cardoso Pinto	26	FW					28	→				
(Angola)	Márcio Luvambo	Márcio Armando Gonçalves Luvambo	–	DF					–			2008	2009	
(Angola)	Marco	Marco Paulo da Silva Filipe		DF					→	14	2007	2008	2009	
(Angola)	Mbinda	Afonso Lando da Silva Zilungo		DF						–				
(Angola)	Mendes										2007			
(Angola)	Mendonça							2004						
(Angola)	Mimí			GK				→	22					
(Angola)	Minguito						2003	2004						
(Angola)	Mota Veiga				2001									
(Angola)	Muandumba	Paulo Manuel Muandumba	27	MF									2009	
(Angola)	Nando Francisco	Fernando António Francisco							8	8		2008		
(Angola)	Nelinho						2003							
(Angola)	Nelson			DF			2003	→						
(Angola)	Nicho	Bento Gonçalves Chitunga							→	–	→			
(Angola)	Nicolau			MF		2002	2003	2004						
(Angola)	Palanca							2004						
(Angola)	Patrick							2004						
(Angola)	Paulinho Sousa	Paulo António Duarte Castro Sousa	35	DF									2009	
(Angola)	Paulo Jorge	Paulo Jorge		GK			2003	2004						
(Angola)	Quimema			FW			2003							
(Angola)	Roger Luta	Rogério Bataga Luta		MF		2002	2003	→						
(Angola)	Savento					2002	2003	2004						
(Angola)	Sassoma	Martinho João Sassoma		DF						4	2007	4	→	
(Angola)	Solito			DF		2002								
(Angola)	Sting	Diogo José Mateus Pascoal		MF					13	13	2007	15		
(Angola)	Tata						2003							
(Angola)	Tavares, Miguel	Miguel Tavares Ricardo											2009	
(Cape Verde)	Tiganá	João Tigana Baptista Robalo	24	MF						–	2007			
(Angola)	Tongua	Joaquim Tongua Sanzala		MF				2004	–	→				
(Democratic Republic of the Congo)	Tuabi	Richard Tuabi Kasende	22	FW				2004	10	10				
(Angola)	Tunga Mateus	Luís Simão Mateus		MF								8		
(Angola)	Vado										2007			
(Angola)	Vemba	Vemba Luzizila		MF					–		2007	2008		
(Angola)	Vunda								9	9	2007			
(Angola)	Wemba						2003							
(Zambia)	William Chilufya	William Chilufya		FW								2008	2009	
(Angola)	Willy	Willy Etina Bela		DF							2007			
(Angola)	Zamorano	Marcolino Silva		FW								2008	2009	
(Angola)	Zé Luís			GK				2004						
(Angola)	Zezinho Avelino	José Horácio Artur Avelino	23	FW					→	19	2007	19	→	
(Angola)	Zezito	Rafael Domingos		GK					–				2009	
(Democratic Republic of the Congo)	Zola Nseka	Zola Nseka		FW		2002								
Years					2001	2002	2003	2004	2005	2006	2007	2008	2009	2010

== 1991–2000 ==
Estrela Clube Primeiro de Maio players 1991–2000

Nat	Nick	Name	A	P				R.T.	J.R.	R.F.	
Nat	Nick	Name	A	P	1991	1992	1993	1994	1995	1996	
Nat	Nick	Name	A	P	–	–	–	–	–	–	
(Angola)	Avelino							1994	1995		
(Angola)	Betinho									1996	
(Angola)	Beto Carmelino							1994			
(Angola)	Brandão	António Brandão					1993	1994	1995	1996	↑
(Angola)	Buyo								1995		
(Angola)	Castella	Martinho Joaquim Castella Quessongo					1993	1994	1995		
(Angola)	David						1993				
(Angola)	Feliciano									1996	
(Angola)	Jacinto	Jacinto Pereira	22						1995	1996	
(Angola)	Jorge	Jorge Andrade							1995	1996	
(Angola)	Jorgito						1993	1994	1995		
(Angola)	Júnior			GK			1993	1994			
(Angola)	Malagi							1994			
(Angola)	Mandiangu									1996	
(Angola)	Miguel						1993	1994	1995		
(Angola)	Milocas								1995		
(Angola)	Minguito						1993	1994			
(Angola)	Minhonha									1996	
(Angola)	Moisés	Moisés Almeida		MF				1994			
(Angola)	Nana							1994			
(Angola)	Nando			GK				1994	1995	1996	
(Angola)	Nelito						1993	1994			
(Angola)	Nelson						1993	1994	1995	1996	
(Angola)	Nzongo									1996	
(Angola)	Paulão						1993				
(Angola)	Pelé								1995		
(Angola)	Rúben Bendrau	Rúben Bendrau	28						1995		
(Angola)	Salvador						1993				
(Angola)	Santana						1993	1994			
(Angola)	Seoul						1993	1994			
(Angola)	Tadeu							1994	1995		
(Angola)	Willy							1994			
(Angola)	Yamba Asha	Yamba Asha João	20	DF					1995	1996	
(Angola)	Zé Gomes								1995		
Years					1991	1992	1993	1994	1995	1996	

== 1981–1990 ==
Estrela Clube Primeiro de Maio players 1981–1990

Nat	Nick	Name	A	P	–	R. G.	P.K.	J.M.	R.R.	E.V.	–
Nat	Nick	Name	A	P	1981	1982	1983	1984	1985	1986	1987
Nat	Nick	Name	A	P	–	–	–	–	–	–	–
(Angola)	Abreu	Carlos Abreu		DF	1981	1982					
(Angola)	Agostinho	Agostinho Reis		DF		1982	1983	1984	1985	1986	
(Angola)	André	Nzuzi André	28	DF	1981	1982	1983	1984	1985	1986	
(Angola)	Barros	António Barros		MF	1981	1982	1983				
(Angola)	Borges			DF			1983	1984	1985	1986	
(Angola)	Cabinda			DF					1985	1986	
(Angola)	Camosso						1983	1984			
(Angola)	Carlos Alberto	Carlos Alberto		DF	1981						
(Angola)	Chahas			FW						1986	
(Angola)	Chico							1984	1985		
(Angola)	Chico II							1984			
(Angola)	Chiquinho								1985	1986	
(Angola)	Daniel	Daniel Mansukinini	31	FW	1981	1982	1983	1984	1985	1986	
(Angola)	Danila			GK				1984	1985	1986	
(Angola)	Décio				1981						
(Angola)	Elavoko	Artur Elavoko		DF	1981						
(Angola)	Fidèle	Lubanzadio Fidèle		MF		1982	1983	1984	1985	1986	
(Angola)	Firmino			MF		1982					
(Angola)	Francisco							1984			
(Angola)	Fusso	Fusso Kossi	31	MF		1982	1983	1984	1985	1986	1987
(Angola)	Gabriel					1982	1983				
(Angola)	Garcia	Pedro Garcia	32	DF			→	1984	1985		
(Angola)	Gita			GK	1981						
(Angola)	Jamba			MF						1986	
(Angola)	João de Deus	João de Deus Barros		GK	1981		1983				
(Angola)	João Gregório	João Rodrigues Gregório		MF	1981						
(Angola)	João Manuel			GK		1982					
(Angola)	Joaquim	Joaquim Felix Feliciano Machado		GK		1982	→				
(Angola)	Jorge			FW					1985	1986	
(Angola)	Juca	Abel Gregório		FW	1981	→					
(Angola)	Kelson	António Kelson		DF	1981	1982	1983				
(Angola)	Kiala	Kiala Samuel		GK			1983		1985	1986	
(Angola)	Laku				1981						
(Angola)	Lázaro			DF		1982	1983				
(Angola)	Lucombo				1981						
(Angola)	Lunguila	André Lunguila		DF	1981						
(Angola)	Maluka †	Joseph Maluka	26	FW	1981	1982	1983	1984			
(Angola)	Manuel					1982					
(Angola)	Melanchton	João Manuel de Jesus Melanchton	28	DF		→	1983	1984	1985	1986	
(Angola)	Minguito								1985		
(Angola)	Miúdo								1985	1986	
(Angola)	Moisés			FW					1985	1986	
(Angola)	Muzemba					1982					
(Angola)	Nando	Fernando Morais		GK				1984	1985	1986	
(Angola)	Neco			FW	1981						
(Angola)	Nelson			MF	1981		1983				
(Angola)	Ouah			DF						1986	
(Angola)	Pina							1984			
(Angola)	Poy							1984			
(Angola)	Quim	Joaquim Williams		FW	1981						
(Angola)	Raúl	Raúl Tadeu				1982					
(Angola)	Reigadinha	Armando Coelho Reigadinha		DF	1981						
(Angola)	Rui Teixeira	Rui Teixeira		MF	1981	1982					
(Angola)	Santana						1983				
(Angola)	Sarmento	Sarmento Seke	28	MF	1981	1982	1983	1984	1985	1986	
(Angola)	Sequeira			DF	1981	1982					
(Angola)	Simões	Luís Domingos Simões		DF		1982	1983	1984	1985	→	
(Angola)	Skoda							1984			
(Angola)	Sozinho			FW						1986	
(Angola)	Tadeu			FW	1981	1982					
(Angola)	Tarzan	Fernando Manuel Saturnino de Oliveira	31		1981						
(Angola)	Tomás							1984			
(Angola)	Tomás II			GK	1981	1982	1983	1984			
(Angola)	Tudila	Tudila Alberto		GK	1981						
(Angola)	Vicy	Vicy António	33					1984	1985	1986	
(Angola)	Zandú †	Zandu João	31	FW	→	1982	1983	1984	1985	1986	
(Angola)	Zé Águas	José Águas		FW	1981	1982	1983	1984	1985	1986	
(Angola)	Zito			MF	1981						
Years					1981	1982	1983	1984	1985	1986	1987

== See also ==
- Category:Estrela Clube Primeiro de Maio players
