= 2013 Girabola =

Girabola
- Season: 2013 (Feb 26–Nov 3)
- Champions: Kabuscorp S.C.P.
- Relegated: Atlético do Namibe; Porcelana FC; Santos FC
- Champions League: Kabuscorp (winner); 1º de Agosto (runner-up)
- Matches: 240
- Goals: 533 (2.22 per match)
- Top goalscorer: Albert Meyong (20 goals)
- Biggest home win: 1º de Agosto 5-0 Atlético Namibe; Progresso 5-0 Atlético Namibe
- Biggest away win: five teams 0-3
- Highest scoring: Santos FC 4-3 Rec da Caála

The 2013 Girabola was the 35th season of top-tier football in Angola. The season ran from 26 February to 3 November 2013. Recreativo do Libolo were the defending champions. Kabuscorp were crowned champions having won their first title.

The league comprised 16 teams and the bottom three were relegated to the 2014 Segundona.

The winner and the runner-up qualified to the CAF Champions League.

== Changes from 2012 season ==
Relegated: Académica do Soyo, Sporting de Cabinda, Nacional de Benguela
Promoted: Desportivo da Huíla, Porcelana FC, Primeiro de Maio

Locations of the 2013 Girabola teams

== League table ==
Pos	Team	Pld	W	D	L	GF	GA	GD	Pts	Qualification or relegation
1	Kabuscorp (C)	30	22	7	1	53	16	+37	73	Qualification for Champions League
2	Primeiro de Agosto	30	16	7	7	42	23	+19	55	Qualification for Champions League
3	Bravos do Maquis	30	14	10	6	39	22	+17	52	
4	Petro de Luanda	30	14	7	9	37	21	+16	49	
5	Sagrada Esperança	30	11	13	6	35	27	+8	46	
6	Desportivo da Huíla	30	10	12	8	37	32	+5	42	
7	Interclube	30	9	13	8	35	34	+1	40	
8	Recreativo do Libolo	30	10	9	11	33	32	+1	39	
9	Progresso do Sambizanga	30	10	8	12	33	33	0	38	
10	Benfica de Luanda	30	7	14	9	29	30	−1	35	
11	Recreativo da Caála	30	8	10	12	30	36	−6	34	
12	ASA	30	8	8	14	27	38	−11	32	
13	Primeiro de Maio	30	8	8	14	24	39	−15	32	
14	Porcelana FC (R)	30	8	7	15	26	41	−15	31	Relegation to Provincial stages
15	Atlético do Namibe (R)	30	6	8	16	27	60	−33	26	Relegation to Provincial stages
16	Santos FC (R)	30	6	5	19	26	49	−23	23	Relegation to Provincial stages

Updated to match(es) played on 3 November 2013. Source: Girabola.com
Rules for classification: 1) Points; 2) Head-to-head points; 3) Head-to-head goal difference; 4) Goal difference; 5) Goals scored; 6) Fair-play points; 7) Play-off.
(C) Champions; (R) Relegated

== Results ==
Home \ Away	ASA	ATN	BEN	BRA	DES	INT	KAB	PET	POR	PRI	MAI	PRO	CAA	LIB	SAG	SAN
ASA	—	0–1	0–0	1–0	0–3	1–2	0–1	0–2	2–3	3–1	0–2	1–1	1–2	0–1	1–1	3–1
Atlético do Namibe	2–2	—	0–2	0–0	1–3	2–1	0–2	1–1	1–1	1–1	4–1	0–0	2–1	3–2	1–0	0–1
Benfica de Luanda	2–1	2–2	—	0–0	1–1	1–1	0–2	2–0	1–0	0–1	0–0	1–1	3–1	2–4	1–2	1–1
Bravos do Maquis	1–0	3–0	1–3	—	2–2	2–0	0–1	4–2	4–0	0–0	2–0	2–0	1–0	2–0	0–0	0–0
Desportivo da Huíla	0–0	3–2	0–0	2–3	—	2–2	0–0	0–0	2–1	1–2	0–0	0–2	0–1	2–0	1–3	1–1
Interclube	0–1	3–2	0–0	1–1	1–1	—	1–2	1–1	3–0	1–1	3–0	2–1	1–1	1–1	2–2	1–0
Kabuscorp	2–0	4–0	2–1	4–1	3–1	1–0	—	2–1	2–0	1–1	1–1	2–3	4–1	1–0	2–1	3–2
Petro de Luanda	1–1	3–0	1–1	0–0	0–1	4–0	0–0	—	2–0	2–0	1–0	2–0	2–1	0–1	3–0	2–1
Porcelana FC	0–1	3–0	0–0	0–2	1–1	1–1	0–2	2–0	—	2–2	2–1	0–1	2–1	2–1	1–1	2–0
Primeiro de Agosto	2–0	5–0	1–0	1–0	2–0	1–0	0–1	1–0	2–0	—	5–1	0–0	3–0	1–0	1–0	2–1
Primeiro de Maio	3–0	1–1	1–0	0–3	2–1	1–1	1–1	1–0	0–1	2–1	—	1–3	1–1	2–4	0–0	1–0
Progresso do Sambizanga	0–0	5–0	1–1	1–2	1–2	1–2	0–2	0–2	2–0	2–1	1–0	—	1–1	0–1	1–1	2–0
Recreativo da Caála	1–2	3–0	1–1	0–0	1–2	1–1	0–0	1–0	2–0	0–1	0–0	1–0	—	1–1	1–1	1–0
Recreativo do Libolo	1–2	3–1	0–1	1–2	0–0	0–1	1–1	0–1	1–1	1–1	1–0	2–0	2–1	—	1–1	1–0
Sagrada Esperança	2–2	3–0	2–1	0–0	0–2	2–0	0–0	1–0	1–0	1–0	1–0	4–2	0–1	1–1	—	3–1
Santos FC	0–2	1–0	3–1	3–1	0–3	0–2	0–3	0–3	2–1	2–3	0–1	0–1	4–3	1–1	1–1	—

Updated to match(es) played on 3 November 2013. Source: girabola.com
Legend: Blue = home team win; Yellow = draw; Red = away team win.

== Season statistics ==
=== Top scorers ===
Rank	Scorer	Club	Goals
1	(Cameroon) Albert Meyong	Kabuscorp	20
2	(Angola) Guedes	Sagrada Esperança	12
2	(Angola) Massinga	Atlético Namibe	12
4	(Angola) Bena	Desportivo Huíla	11
4	(Angola) Paizinho	Bravos do Maquis	11
6	(Angola) Yano	Progresso Sambizanga	9
6	(Angola) Love	Kabuscorp	9
8	(Angola) Laúcha	Porcelana FC	8
8	(Senegal) Ladji Keita	Petro Luanda	8

2013 Girabola winner

1st title

Squad: Abel, Abulá, Adawa, Biscotte, Breco, Chora, Dax, Dr. Lami, Fiston, Hernâni, Kibeixa, Landu, Libengué, Love, Lunguinha, Meyong, Mpele Mpele, Nuno, Rubia, Saki, Seleó, Silva
Head coach: Eduard Antranik

== See also ==
- 2013 Angola Cup
- 2014 Angola Super Cup
