= Osório Carvalho =

Angolan footballer

Osório
Personal information
- Full name: Osório Smith de Freitas Carvalho
- Date of birth: 24 July 1981 (age 45)
- Place of birth: Carcavelos, Portugal
- Height: 1.77 m (5 ft 10 in)
- Position: Midfielder

Senior career*
Years	Team	Apps	(Gls)
2000–2002	Sporting B	34	(2)
2002	Marco	5	(0)
2002–2003	Estrela Portalegre	16	(3)
2003–2004	Paredes	25	(1)
2004–2005	Pampilhosa	34	(2)
2005–2006	Odivelas	19	(0)
2006–2008	Sintrense		
2008–2009	Juventude de Évora	14	(1)
2009–2010	AEK Kouklia		
2010–2011	Rec Caála		
2012–2015	Petro Luanda		
2015	Rec Caála		
2015	Benfica Luanda		
2016–2017	Académica Lobito		
2017–2018	1º de Dezembro	23	(2)
2018–2019	Sintrense	21	(0)

International career^{‡}
2010–	Angola	6	(0)
Medal record
Men's football
Representing Angola
African Nations Championship
Runner-up	2011 Sudan
- * Club domestic league appearances and goals as of 22:03, 17 November 2019 (UTC) ‡ National team caps and goals as of 16:44, 18 December 2018 (UTC)

Osório Smith de Freitas Carvalho (born 24 July 1981) is a former footballer who played as a midfielder. Born in Portugal, he represented Angola at international level.

== Career ==
Born in Carcavelos, Osório played in his native Portugal for Sporting B, Marco, Estrela Portalegre, Paredes, Pampilhosa, Odivelas, Sintrense and Juventude de Évora, before moving to Cyprus to spend a year-and-a-half with AEK Kouklia where he scored 7 goals.

He signed for Angolan side Caála in 2010, earning Angolan nationality and therefore becoming eligible for the Angolan national side; he made his international debut that same year.

== Honours ==
Angola

- African Nations Championship: runner-up 2011
