= Carlos de Sousa Queirós =

Angolan footballer and manager

Carlos Queirós
Personal information
- Full name: Carlos de Sousa Queirós
- Date of birth: 31 March 1946 (age 80)
- Place of birth: Quibala

Senior career*
| Years | Team | Apps | (Gls) |
- Petro Atlético

Managerial career
- 1988: Angola
- 1989–1991: Petro Atlético
- 1991: Angola Olympic team
- * Club domestic league appearances and goals

Carlos de Sousa Queirós is a former Angolan footballer and coach.

During 1988, he was in charge of the Angola.

He led the Angolan team in the 1990 FIFA World Cup qualification – CAF first round, an international friendly and the 1988 CECAFA Cup.
