= Érico Castro =

Angolan footballer (born 1992)

Personal information
- Full name: Érico Roberto Mendes Alves Castro
- Date of birth: 21 September 1992 (age 34)
- Place of birth: Oeiras, Portugal
- Height: 1.85 m (6 ft 1 in)
- Position: Forward

Team information
- Current team: Fafe
- Number: 88

Youth career
- 2006–2011: Tires

Senior career*
Years	Team	Apps	(Gls)
2011–2012	Tires	25	(8)
2012–2013	Oeiras	24	(3)
2013–2014	Tires	10	(2)
2014	Fátima	6	(1)
2014–2015	Aljustrelense	22	(15)
2015–2017	Real	59	(18)
2017–2018	Sintrense	14	(3)
2018	Casa Pia	13	(5)
2018–2019	Felgueiras	3	(0)
2019–2021	Louletano	40	(24)
2021–2022	Petro Luanda	19	(9)
2022–2023	Differdange 03	25	(13)
2023–2024	Maribor	12	(2)
2024	→ Rogaška (loan)	5	(0)
2024–	Fafe	11	(1)

International career
2021	Angola	2	(0)
- * Club domestic league appearances and goals as of 25 June 2025

Érico Roberto Mendes Alves Castro (born 21 September 1992) is a professional footballer who plays as a forward for Fafe. Born in Portugal, he represented the Angola national team internationally.

== Club career ==
Castro spent most of his playing career in Portugal in the Campeonato de Portugal. He began his senior career with Tires, and thereafter had stints with Oeiras, Fátima, Aljustrelense, Real, Sintrense, Casa Pia, Felgueiras, and Louletano. He moved to Angola with Petro Luanda on 23 August 2021.

== International career ==
Born in Portugal, Castro is of Angolan descent. He debuted for the Angola national team in a 3–1 2022 FIFA World Cup qualification win over Gabon on 8 October 2021.
