= Albert Meyong =

Cameroonian footballer (born 1980)

Personal information
- Full name: Albert Meyong Zé
- Date of birth: 19 October 1980 (age 46)
- Place of birth: Yaoundé, Cameroon
- Height: 1.84 m (6 ft 0 in)
- Position: Striker

Senior career*
Years	Team	Apps	(Gls)
1997–1998	Canon Yaoundé		
1998–1999	Ravenna	7	(2)
2000–2005	Vitória Setúbal	150	(56)
2005–2006	Belenenses	26	(17)
2006–2008	Levante	12	(1)
2007	→ Albacete (loan)	13	(0)
2008	→ Belenenses (loan)	1	(1)
2008–2011	Braga	65	(22)
2012–2013	Vitória Setúbal	25	(16)
2013–2015	Kabuscorp	80	(50)
2016–2017	Vitória Setúbal	19	(1)
2020–2021	Comércio Indústria	9	(5)
Total		407	(171)

International career
2004–2009	Cameroon	12	(3)

Managerial career
- 2017–2020: Vitória Setúbal (assistant)
- 2019: Vitória Setúbal (caretaker)
- 2020: Vitória Setúbal (caretaker)
- 2021–2022: Comércio Indústria
- 2022: Villa Athletic
Medal record
Men's Football
Representing Cameroon
Olympic Games
Gold medal – first place	2000 Sydney	Team competition
- * Club domestic league appearances and goals

Albert Meyong Zé (born 19 October 1980), known as Meyong, is a Cameroonian former professional footballer who played as a striker.

He spent most of his career in Portugal, amassing Primeira Liga totals of 231 matches and 79 goals over 13 seasons and representing mainly in the competition Vitória de Setúbal (seven years) and Braga (three and a half).

Meyong appeared with Cameroon at the 2006 Africa Cup of Nations.

== Club career ==
Born in Yaoundé, Meyong started playing in Europe still a youngster, for Italian club Ravenna Calcio. After one and a half seasons he moved to Portuguese Primeira Liga side Vitória Futebol Clube; he won the Taça de Portugal in 2005, having scored the winning goal in the final against S.L. Benfica.

In the summer of 2005, Meyong signed a two-year contract with C.F. Os Belenenses – where he was the league's top scorer despite the club's bottom-four finish– moving to Levante UD a year later. Due to late payment of salary he was loaned to Albacete Balompié, after one appearance for Levante in 2007–08.

Meyong returned to Portugal and Belenenses in January 2008, netting the penalty winner against Associação Naval 1º de Maio in a 2–1 home win but, being this the third team he represented in the season, which went against FIFA regulations, his registration was deemed illegal and Belenenses condemned to lose six points in the table (awarded 0–3 loss and three-point penalty in this match). This led to fans of the latter assaulting director of football Carlos Janela before the decision was taken, with him also being immediately sacked.

In August 2008, Meyong joined S.C. Braga of the same league. He scored his first goal for his new team on the 23rd, in a 2–0 defeat of F.C. Paços de Ferreira. He added a hat-trick on 18 September in a UEFA Cup first-round tie against Artmedia Bratislava, a 4–0 home victory. Midway through 2008–09 he agreed to a new one-year deal, running until June 2011.

In 2009–10, Meyong was an essential attacking unit for Braga, scoring 11 league goals as the Minho club finished in the second position, a best-ever. During the campaign, for example, he found the net against Sporting CP (2–1 away win), adding two late penalties against neighbours Vitória de Guimarães (3–2, at home).

In late December 2011, Meyong was released by Braga after very little playing time in his last two seasons, along with Rodrigo Galo, Marcos and Fran Mérida. After being linked to C.D. Nacional and C.D. Feirense he eventually returned to Setúbal and Vitória, after seven years.

Meyong led the national scoring charts midway through the 2012–13 season, alongside FC Porto's Jackson Martínez and Benfica's Óscar Cardozo; highlights included three goals against Rio Ave FC (but in a 3–5 home defeat) and Moreirense FC (5–0, home). In early January 2013, however, he moved to Luanda-based Kabuscorp S.C. in Angola.

After retiring at the age of 36, Meyong joined Vitória de Setúbal's coaching staff as an assistant. On 28 October 2019, after Sandro Mendes' dismissal, he was named caretaker, and held this post again next July between the resignation of Julio Velázquez and appointment of Lito Vidigal; his managerial debut was on 31 October, in a 1–1 draw at C.D. Santa Clara.

Meyong briefly came out of retirement aged 40, appearing for amateurs União Futebol Comércio e Indústria after an invitation from his friend João Tavira who was their vice-president.

== International career ==
Meyong played for the Cameroon national team over five years, his debut coming in 2004. He also represented his country at the 2000 Summer Olympics, where he won a gold medal.

Meyong was picked for the squad that appeared at the 2006 Africa Cup of Nations: manager Artur Jorge started him alongside FC Barcelona's Samuel Eto'o during the tournament and he scored two goals, one in the group stage against Togo and another in the quarter-finals against Ivory Coast as the Lions Indomptables exited after losing on penalties 12–11.

== Career statistics ==
=== Club ===
Appearances and goals by club, season and competition
Club	Season	League		National cup		League cup		Continental		Total	
Club	Season	Apps	Goals	Apps	Goals	Apps	Goals	Apps	Goals	Apps	Goals
Ravenna	1998–99	7	2	0	0	–		–		7	2
Vitória Setúbal	1999–2000	9	2	0	0	–		–		9	2
Vitória Setúbal	2000–01	22	13	0	0	–		–		22	13
Vitória Setúbal	2001–02	29	3	0	0	–		–		29	3
Vitória Setúbal	2002–03	24	7	0	0	–		–		24	7
Vitória Setúbal	2003–04	33	20	4	1	–		–		37	21
Vitória Setúbal	2004–05	33	11	4	4	–		–		37	15
Vitória Setúbal	Total	150	56	8	5	0	0	0	0	158	61
Belenenses	2005–06	26	17	1	0	–		–		27	17
Levante	2006–07	11	1	0	0	–		–		11	1
Levante	2007–08	1	0	0	0	–		–		1	0
Levante	Total	12	1	0	0	0	0	0	0	12	1
Albacete (loan)	2007–08	13	0	0	0	–		–		13	0
Belenenses (loan)	2007–08	1	1	0	0	–		–		1	1
Braga	2008–09	18	8	2	1	0	0	10	5	30	14
Braga	2009–10	29	11	4	0	1	0	2	1	36	12
Braga	2010–11	15	3	2	0	2	1	9	0	28	4
Braga	2011–12	3	0	0	0	0	0	1	0	4	0
Braga	Total	65	22	8	1	3	1	22	6	98	30
Vitória Setúbal	2011–12	9	3	0	0	2	0	–		11	3
Vitória Setúbal	2012–13	13	13	2	2	2	2	–		17	17
Vitória Setúbal	Total	22	16	2	2	4	2	0	0	28	20
Kabuscorp	2013	23	20	1	0	–		–		24	20
Kabuscorp	2014	29	17	3	1	–		2	0	34	18
Kabuscorp	2015	28	13	0	0	–		3	2	31	15
Kabuscorp	Total	80	50	4	1	0	0	5	2	89	53
Vitória Setúbal	2015–16	7	0	0	0	0	0	–		7	0
Vitória Setúbal	2016–17	12	1	1	0	0	0	–		20	0
Vitória Setúbal	Total	19	1	1	0	2	0	0	0	22	1
Comércio Indústria	2020–21	9	5	–		–		–		9	5
Career total		407	171	18	6	7	1	22	6	454	184

=== International ===
Scores and results list Cameroon's goal tally first, score column indicates score after each Meyong goal.

List of international goals scored by Albert Meyong
No.	Date	Venue	Opponent	Score	Result	Competition
1	25 January 2006	Military Academy Stadium, Cairo, Egypt	Togo		2–0	2006 Africa Cup of Nations
2	4 February 2006	Military Academy Stadium, Cairo, Egypt	Ivory Coast		1–1	2006 Africa Cup of Nations
3	11 October 2008	Omnisports Ahmadou Ahidjo, Yaoundé, Cameroon	Mauritius		5–0	2010 FIFA World Cup qualification
4	11 October 2008	Omnisports Ahmadou Ahidjo, Yaoundé, Cameroon	Mauritius		5–0	2010 FIFA World Cup qualification

== Honours ==
Vitória Setúbal

- Taça de Portugal: 2004–05

Braga

- UEFA Intertoto Cup: 2008
- UEFA Europa League runner-up: 2010–11

Kabuscorp

- Girabola: 2013
- Supertaça de Angola: 2014

Cameroon

- Summer Olympic Games: 2000

Individual

- Primeira Liga top scorer: 2005–06 (17 goals)
- Taça de Portugal top scorer: 2004–05 (4 goals)
- Girabola top scorer: 2013 (20 goals), 2014 (17 goals), 2015 (13 goals)
