= Fernando Pereira (Angolan footballer) =

Angolan footballer

Personal information
- Date of birth: December 16, 1973 (age 52)
- Place of birth: Angola
- Position: Goalkeeper

International career
Years	Team	Apps	(Gls)
2000–2002	Angola	4	(0)

Fernando Pereira (born December 16, 1973) is an Angolan football player. He has played for Angola national team.

== National team statistics ==
Angola national team
Year	Apps	Goals
2000	1	0
2001	1	0
2002	2	0
Total	4	0

== See also ==
- List of Angola international footballers
