= Pascal Kondaponi =

Nigerian footballer

Pascal
Personal information
- Full name: Pascal Kondaponi naftali
- Date of birth: 26 December 1980 (age 45)
- Place of birth: Lagos, Nigeria
- Height: 1.85 m (6 ft 1 in)
- Positions: Striker; winger

Youth career
- 2000: Nigerian Flying eagles

Senior career*
Years	Team	Apps	(Gls)
2000	Puebla	0	(0)
2001–2002	Freamunde	34	(10)
2002	Nacional	18	(4)
2003–2004	Vitória F.C.	34	(5)
2004–2005	F.C. Penafiel	7	(0)
2005–2006	Bnei Sakhnin F.C.	32	(5)
2006	Portimonense S.C.	10	(2)
2007	Ayia Napa F.C.	8	(1)
2007	C.D. Aves	17	(1)
2008	Ljungskile SK	18	(2)
2009	Qingdao	4	(1)
2010	U.D. Oliveirense	11	(1)
2010–	1º de Agosto		

International career
	Nigeria U-23	5	(2)
- * Club domestic league appearances and goals

Pascal Naftali Kondaponi (born 16 December 1980 in Lagos) is a Nigerian football striker.

== Clubs ==
- 2012 Sheikh russel Bangladesh premier league
- 2009 Qingdao
- 2008/09 Ljungskile SK

as of

- 2007/08 C.D. Aves
- 2006/07 Portimonense S.C.
- 2005/06 Bnei Sakhnin F.C. / Vitória F.C.
- 2004/05 F.C. Penafiel
- 2003/04 Vitória F.C.
- 2002/03 Vitória F.C. / Nacional
- 2001/02 Nacional
- 2000/01 S.C. Freamunde / Puebla F.C.
