= Ladji Keita =

Senegalese footballer (born 1983)

Personal information
- Date of birth: 29 April 1983 (age 43)
- Place of birth: Dakar, Senegal
- Height: 1.88 m (6 ft 2 in)
- Position: Striker

Senior career*
Years	Team	Apps	(Gls)
2002–2003	Jeanne d'Arc		
2003–2004	Valence	9	(0)
2005	Alverca	13	(7)
2005–2008	Rio Ave	76	(15)
2008	Atromitos	17	(1)
2009	AEP	11	(2)
2009–2010	Vitória Setúbal	25	(10)
2010–2012	Braga	4	(1)
2011	→ Beijing Guoan (loan)	10	(1)
2012	→ Nacional (loan)	12	(6)
2012–2013	Nacional	19	(3)
2013–2014	Petro Atlético		(21)
2014	Kabuscorp		
Total		196	(67)
- * Club domestic league appearances and goals

Ladji Keita (born 29 April 1983, in Dakar) is a Senegalese retired professional footballer who played as a striker.

== Career statistics ==
Appearances and goals by club, season and competition
Club	Season	League			National Cup		League Cup		Continental		Other		Total	
Club	Season	Division	Apps	Goals	Apps	Goals	Apps	Goals	Apps	Goals	Apps	Goals	Apps	Goals
Valence	2003–04	Ligue 2	3	0	—		—		—		—		3	0
Valence	2004–05	National	6	0	—		1	0	—		—		7	0
Valence	Total		9	0	—		1	0	—		—		10	0
Alverca	2004–05	Segunda Divisão	13	7	—		—		—		—		13	7
Rio Ave	2005–06	Primeira Liga	21	1	1	0	—		—		—		22	1
Rio Ave	2006–07	Segunda Divisão	29	9	1	0	—		—		—		30	9
Rio Ave	2007–08	Primeira Liga	26	5	4	6	1	0	—		—		31	11
Rio Ave	Total		76	15	6	6	1	0	—		—		83	21
Atromitos	2008–09	Cypriot First Division	17	1	0	0	—		—		—		17	1
AEP	2008–09	Cypriot First Division	11	2	—		—		—		—		11	2
Vitória Setúbal	2009–10	Primeira Liga	25	10	1	0	2	0	—		—		28	10
Braga	2010–11	Primeira Liga	4	1	1	0	2	1	0	0	—		7	2
Beijing Guoan (loan)	2011	Chinese Super League	10	1	2	1	—		—		—		12	2
Nacional (loan)	2011–12	Primeira Liga	12	6	1	0	1	1	—		—		14	7
Nacional	2012–13	Primeira Liga	19	3	2	1	2	0	—		—		23	4
Nacional	Total		31	9	3	1	3	1	—		—		37	11
Petro Atlético	2013	Girabola					—		—		—			
Petro Atlético	2013	Girabola					—				—			
Petro Atlético	Total			21			—				—			21
Kabuscorp	2014	Girabola					—		—		—			
Career total			196	67	13	8	7	2	0	0	0	0	216	77
