= Bernardino Pedroto =

Portuguese football manager and former player

Personal information
- Full name: António Carlos Bernardino Pedroto
- Date of birth: 19 October 1953 (age 73)
- Place of birth: Lisbon, Portugal
- Position: Midfielder

Youth career
- 1969–1973: Benfica

Senior career*
| Years | Team | Apps | (Gls) |
| 1973–1974 | Benfica | 1 | (0) |
| 1974–1979 | Vitória Guimarães | 94 | (11) |
| 1979–1981 | Marítimo | 53 | (6) |
| 1981–1983 | Vitória Guimarães | 38 | (3) |
| 1983–1986 | Portimonense | 40 | (8) |
| Total | | 226 | (28) |

International career
| 1971 | Portugal U18 | 2 | (0) |

Managerial career
- 1986–1988: Silves
- 1989–1990: Vitória Guimarães (assistant)
- 1990–1991: Benfica Castelo Branco
- 1991–1992: Varzim
- 1992: Benfica Castelo Branco
- 1992–1993: Vitória Guimarães (assistant)
- 1993–1994: Vitória Guimarães
- 1995–1996: Gil Vicente
- 1997: Campomaiorense
- 1998–1999: Portimonense
- 1999–2000: Moreirense
- 2001–2007: ASA
- 2007–2010: Petro Atlético
- 2012–2013: Interclube
- 2014–2015: Caála
- * Club domestic league appearances and goals

António Carlos Bernardino Pedroto (born 19 October 1953) is a Portuguese former footballer who played as an attacking midfielder, and is a manager.

== Playing career ==
Born in Lisbon, Pedroto started playing football with local S.L. Benfica. He began training with the first team in the 1972–73 season, which ended in Primeira Liga conquest, but his only league appearance for the club only came the following campaign.

After leaving Benfica, Pedroto represented always in the top division, where he amassed totals of 226 matches and 28 goals during 13 seasons, Vitória de Guimarães (two spells), C.S. Marítimo and Portimonense SC, retiring in June 1986 at nearly 33; with Vitória, he also appeared in three UEFA Cup editions.

== Coaching career ==
Pedroto's first job as a head coach in the professionals was in 1990–91, as he led Sport Benfica e Castelo Branco to the fifth position in the second level, just one point shy of promotion. After one year in the lower leagues with Varzim SC, he was appointed at former club Vitória de Guimarães, helping them finish seventh in the top flight in his only full season.

Pedroto never again finished one season during the rest of his Portugal coaching career at the professional level, with the exception being 1993–94 with Guimarães (seventh place, top division) and 1995–96 with Gil Vicente FC (11th position, same tier). Subsequently, he moved to Angola and signed for Atlético Sport Aviação, winning the Girabola tournament three consecutive seasons (2002–04) and finishing second in 2005.

Pedroto left Aviação in early January 2007, due to financial difficulties. The following day, he was appointed at fellow league side Atlético Petróleos Luanda.

In 2008, Pedroto made history in Angolan football as he won a record four national championships – eventually five – overtaking Mário Calado of Santos Futebol Clube de Angola. As ASA's manager he also conquered four Supercups, another best-ever.

Pedroto left Petro at the end of the 2010 season. He continued to work in the country in the following years, with G.D. Interclube and C.R. Caála.
