= C.R. Caála =

Angolan football club

Recreativo da Caála
- Full name: Clube Recreativo da Caála
- Founded: 24 June 1944; 81 years ago
- Ground: Estádio Mártires da Canhala; Caála, Huambo, Angola
- Capacity: 11,000
- Chairman: Horácio Mosquito
- Manager: David Dias
- League: Segundona
- 2025–26: 1th
Home colours	Away colours

Clube Recreativo da Caála, commonly known as just Recreativo da Caála, is an Angolan football club based in Caála, a municipality 23 km to the province's capital city of Huambo.

== History ==
CR Caála was founded on 24 June 1944 and competing in Angola's top-level league, the Girabola.

The management of Recreativo da Caála dismissed on Monday [3 May] the Portuguese Victor Manuel as the coach of the football club. Also according to the same source, the team also sacked the assistant coach Jorge Prisca and Fernando Pereira, goalkeepers coach.

== Stadium ==
Recreativo da Caála is one of the few clubs in Angola's top division to own a football stadium, the Estádio Mártires da Canhala. The former 3,000 capacity stadium has been rehabilitated and expanded to 10,000-seats. It's reinauguration took place on 6 October 2013.

== Achievements ==
- Angola Cup
  - Runners-up (1): 2012
- Segundona
- Champions (1): 2026

== Recent seasons ==
C.R. Caála's season-by-season performance since 2011:

Overall match statistics
Season	Pld	W	D	L	GF	GA	GD	%
2016	31	8	10	13	27	27	0	0.468
2015	32	8	15	9	30	26	+4	0.391

Classifications
LG	AC	SC	CL	CC
11th	PR			
11th	R16			

Top season scorers
Player	LG	AC	SC	CL	CC	T
Paizinho	9	0				9
Paizinho	10	?				10

- PR = Preliminary round, 1R = First round, GS = Group stage, R32 = Round of 32, R16 = Round of 16, QF = Quarter-finals, SF = Semi-finals

== Performance in CAF competitions ==
- CAF Champions League: 1 appearance

2011 – First Round

- CAF Confederation Cup: 1 appearance
  - 2013 – Second Round

== Players and staff ==
=== Staff ===
Name	Nat	Pos
Technical staff
David Dias	(Angola)	Head coach
Luís Aires	(Portugal)	Assistant coach
Yamba Asha	(Angola)	Assistant coach
Severino Capessa	(Angola)	Goalkeeper coach
Medical
	(Angola)	Physician
Rui Garcia	(Angola)	Physio
	(Angola)	Masseur
Management
Horácio Mosquito	(Angola)	Chairman
	(Angola)	Vice-chairman
	(Angola)	Head of Foot Dept

== Manager history and performance ==
Season	Coach	L2	L1	C	Coach	L2	L1	C	Coach	L2	L1	C
1985	(Angola) Arlindo Leitão											
1986	(Angola) Arlindo Leitão											
2005	(Angola) António Sayombo †	3rd										
2007	(Angola) Mbuisso António	3rd										
2008	(Angola) Hélder Teixeira				(Portugal) Jorge Paixão	1st		DNP				
2009	(Portugal) Jorge Paixão		9th	QF								
2010	(Portugal) Rui Gregório				(Angola) João Kódia				(Angola) David Dias		2nd	R16
2011	(Portugal) Vítor Manuel				(Portugal) Luís Aires		4th	QF				
2012	(Portugal) Luís Aires				(Angola) Fernando Pereira		10th	RU				
2013	(Portugal) Ricardo Formosinho				(Portugal) Vaz Pinto		11th	SF				
2014	(Portugal) Vaz Pinto				(Angola) Fernando Pereira		7th	R16				
2015	(Portugal) Bernardino Pedroto				(Angola) Hélder Teixeira				(Portugal) Luís Aires		11th	R16
2016	(Portugal) Luís Aires				(Angola) Alberto Cardeau		11th	R32				
2017	(Angola) Alberto Cardeau				(Angola) David Dias		8th	R16				
2018	(Angola) David Dias		12th									
2018-19	(Angola) David Dias		9th									
2019-20	(Angola) Hélder Teixeira				(Angola) David Dias							

== See also ==
- Girabola
- Gira Angola
