= Lépua =

Angolan professional footballer

Personal information
- Full name: Simone Eduardo Assa Miranda
- Date of birth: 23 December 1999 (age 26)
- Place of birth: Angola
- Height: 1.68 m (5 ft 6 in)
- Position: Attacking midfielder

Team information
- Current team: Sagrada Esperança

Senior career*
Years	Team	Apps	(Gls)
2018–	Sagrada Esperança	123	(14)

International career^{‡}
2021–	Angola	14	(1)
- * Club domestic league appearances and goals as of 5:44, 3 May 2026 (UTC) ‡ National team caps and goals as of 00:14, 17 November 2021 (UTC)

Simone Eduardo Assa Miranda (born 23 December 1999), better known as Lépua, is an Angolan professional footballer who plays as attacking midfielder for Girabola club Sagrada Esperança and the Angola national team.

== Professional career ==
Lépua is a youth product of Sagrada Esperança, and debuted with the senior team in 2018.

== International career ==
Lépuadebuted with the Angola national team in a 1–0 2022 FIFA World Cup qualification loss to Egypt on 1 September 2021.
