= Adawá Mokanga =

Angolan footballer

Adawá
Personal information
- Full name: Adawá Mokanga
- Date of birth: 3 January 1985 (age 41)
- Place of birth: Kinshasa, Zaïre
- Height: 1.87 m (6 ft 1 1/2 in)
- Position: Midfielder

Senior career*
| Years | Team | Apps | (Gls) |
| 2008 | Académica Soyo | | |
| 2009–2010 | Benfica de Luanda | | |
| 2011–2012 | CRD Libolo | | |
| 2013–2014 | Kabuscorp | 35 | (4) |
| 2015 | Benfica de Luanda | 13 | (1) |

International career
| 2010–2013 | Angola | 18 | (0) |
Medal record
Men's football
Representing Angola
African Nations Championship
| Runner-up | 2011 Sudan |
- * Club domestic league appearances and goals

Adawá Mokanga (born 3 January 1985) is an Angolan international footballer who plays as a midfielder.

== Career ==
Adawá has formerly played for Académica Soyo and Benfica de Luanda.

He made his international debut for Angola in 2010.

== Honours ==
CRD Libolo

- 2011, 2012

Kabuscorp

- 2013

Angola

- African Nations Championship: runner-up 2011
