= Serge Mputu =

Congolese footballer

Personal information
- Full name: Serge Mputu-Bandu Mbungu
- Date of birth: 21 May 1980 (age 46)
- Place of birth: Zaire
- Height: 1.78 m (5 ft 10 in)
- Position: Striker

Senior career*
Years	Team	Apps	(Gls)
1998–1999	AS Paulino		
1999–2000	Al-Hilal		
2000–2003	Lokeren	12	(0)
2001–2002	Harelbeke	29	(7)
2003–2006	Al-Hilal		
2006–2008	Benfica de Luanda		
2009	AS Vita Club		
2012	Benfica de Luanda	4	(1)

International career
1999–2007	DR Congo	4	(2)
- * Club domestic league appearances and goals

Serge Mputu-Bandu Mbungu (born 21 May 1980) is a Congolese footballer.

== International career ==
The midfielder was a member of the DR Congo a football team in Congo.
