= Love (footballer) =

Angolan footballer (born 1979)

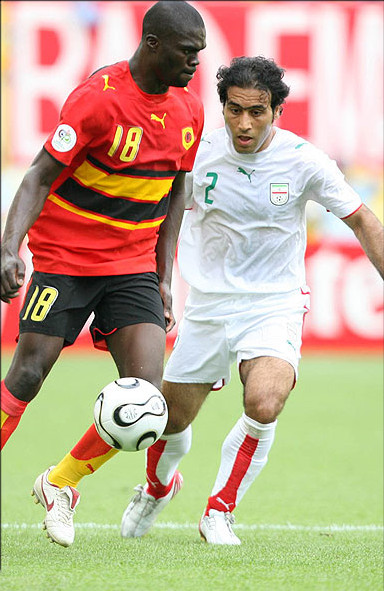
- Love at the 2006 FIFA World Cup

Personal information
- Full name: Arsénio Sebastião Cabungula
- Date of birth: 14 March 1979 (age 47)
- Place of birth: Luanda, Angola
- Height: 1.81 m (5 ft 11 in)
- Position: Forward

Senior career*
Years	Team	Apps	(Gls)
1999–2006	ASA		(61)
2007–2010	Primeiro de Agosto		(29)
2010–2012	Petro Luanda	35	(22)
2013–2014	Kabuscorp	28	(14)
2015	Recreativo da Caála	8	(1)
2015–2016	Sagrada Esperança	26	(5)
2017	ASA	15	(3)

International career
2001–2017	Angola	82	(13)
Medal record
Men's football
Representing Angola
African Nations Championship
Runner-up	2011 Sudan
- * Club domestic league appearances and goals

Arsénio Sebastião Cabungula or Love (born 14 March 1979) is an Angolan former professional footballer. As a forward, he was Angolan top scorer twice in 2004 and 2005. He won three Girabola titles with ASA.

He is a former member of the Angola national team and played regularly, usually as a substitute. He was in his country's squad for the 2006 FIFA World Cup in Germany.

1º de Agosto striker Arsénio Sebastião Cabungula "Love" was a new addition for Petro de Luanda football team, for the second half of national first division soccer league, also dubbed Girabola 2010. The athlete was loaned from 1º de Agosto to Petro de Luanda for a six-month period, with the contract ending in December 2010.

In 2017, he was appointed as the Angolan U17 national team head coach and concurrently, he is serving as an assistant manager with the Angola national football team.

== Career statistics ==
Appearances and goals by national team and year
National team	Year	Apps	Goals
Angola	2001	4	0
Angola	2002	1	0
Angola	2003	6	0
Angola	2004	11	2
Angola	2005	6	2
Angola	2006	11	3
Angola	2007	4	1
Angola	2008	9	0
Angola	2009	7	0
Angola	2010	2	0
Angola	2011	11	4
Angola	2012	3	0
Angola	2013	0	0
Angola	2014	3	1
Angola	2015	0	0
Angola	2016	2	0
Angola	2017	0	0
Total		82	13

Scores and results list Angola's goal tally first, score column indicates score after each Love goal.

List of international goals scored by Love
No.	Date	Venue	Opponent	Score	Result	Competition
1	9 May 2004	Estádio da Cidadela, Luanda, Angola	Namibia	1–0	2–1	2004 COSAFA Cup
2	9 May 2004	Estádio da Cidadela, Luanda, Angola	Namibia	2–0	2–1	2004 COSAFA Cup
3	13 August 2005	Mmabatho Stadium, Mafikeng, South Africa	Zimbabwe	1–0	1–2	2005 COSAFA Cup
4	17 August 2005	Estádio José Gomes, Lisbon, Portugal	Cape Verde	2–1	2–1	Friendly
5	29 April 2006	Setsoto Stadium, Maseru, Lesotho	Mauritius	5–1	5–1	2006 COSAFA Cup
6	2 June 2006	Offermans Joosten Stadion, Sittard, Netherlands	Turkey	2–2	2–3	Friendly
7	17 September 2006	National Sports Stadium, Harare, Zimbabwe	Zimbabwe	2–1	2–1	2006 COSAFA Cup
8	17 June 2007	Estádio da Cidadela, Luanda, Angola	Swaziland	2–0	3–0	2008 Africa Cup of Nations qualification
9	15 February 2011	AlHilal Stadium, Omdurman , Sudan	Rwanda	1-1	2-1	2011 African Nations Championship
10	19 February 2011	Al Merreikh Stadium, Omdurman , Sudan	Sudan	1-1	1-1 (4-2 PEN)	2011 African Nations Championship
11	14 December 2011	Estádio Nacional do Chiazi , Cabinda, Angola	Cameroon	1-0	1-1	Friendly
12	18 December 2011	Estádio Sagrada Esperança, Dundo, Angola	Zambia	1–0	1–0	Friendly
13	15 October 2014	Estádio 11 de Novembro, Luanda, Angola	Lesotho	4–0	4–0	2015 Africa Cup of Nations qualification

== Honours ==
Angola

- African Nations Championship: runner-up 2011
