= Estádio 22 de Junho =

Football stadium in Luanda, Angola

Coordinates: 08°52′8.7636″S 13°12′32.2308″E

- Interactive map of Estádio 22 de Junho
- Location: Rocha Pinto, Luanda, Angola
- Owner: Interclube
- Capacity: 7,800

Construction
- Opened: February 2, 2005; 21 years ago

Tenant
- Interclube

The Estádio 22 de Junho (22 June stadium) is an Angolan stadium built and owned by G.D. Interclube and is the venue for the club's home games in all events that it takes part of. The 7,800-seat stadium was inaugurated on February 2, 2005 and is located in the Rocha Pinto neighborhood, Maianga district, Luanda, Angola. The stadium is one of the few private-owned stadiums in Luanda as the remaining teams based in the capital play in state-owned 11 de Novembro, Cidadela and Coqueiros.

Inauguration match lineup
against 1º de Agosto
27/02/2005
