= Kabuscorp S.C.P. =

Association football club

- Full name: Kabuscorp Sport Clube do Palanca
- Nickname: Os Palanquinos
- Founded: 5 December 1994; 31 years ago
- Ground: Estádio dos Coqueiros; Luanda, Angola
- Capacity: 12,000
- Owner: Bento Kangamba
- Chairman: Vítor Nguvulu
- Manager: Francisco Kamwanga
- League: First Division
- 2025–26: 5th, Girabola
Home colours	Away colours	Third colours

Kabuscorp Sport Clube do Palanca, known simply as Kabuscorp, is an Angolan multi-sports club based in Luanda. The club's football section contests at the Angolan major league Girabola.

Kabuscorp is an acronym for Kangamba Business Corporation, a business ranging from transports to diamond exploration run by club owner Bento Kangamba. Kabuscorp S.C. was founded in 1994 by president and club owner Bento Kangamba. The club plays their home matches at the state-owned Estádio dos Coqueiros and is renowned for their cheerful supporters, mostly of bakongo origin.

== History ==
In 2008, in their first appearance in Girabola they finished in 10th position.

The club's greatest achievement came 6 years later, when they won the 2013 Girabola with a record 73 points, thus qualifying to the 2014 CAF Champions League. In 2014, Kabuscorp won the Angolan Supercup beating Petro de Luanda by 3–1.

=== 2012 road accident ===
On August 4, 2012, twenty three fans of Kabuscorp do Palanca club died and 29 others injured, following a road accident on the road connecting the provinces of Kwanza Norte and Luanda. The accident occurred when a bus carrying the supporters of Palanca club was returning from the town of Calulo, coastal Kwanza sul province, after a football match opposing home side Recreativo do Libolo and Kabuscorp. The match was part of the 20th round of national league's first division, Girabola 2012, which ended with a 2–0 victory for the host team.

=== 2018 penalties ===
In May, FIFA has instructed the Angolan Football Federation that Kabuscorp should forfeit 6 points in the 2018 league as a result of being in default to their former star player Rivaldo. In a weekly report issued by the Angolan federation, it is further stated that the club may be banned from official competition in case the claimant files a new complaint.

In June, FIFA again ruled that Kabuscorp forfeits an additional 6 points in the league for being in default with DRC's TP Mazembe in the 2014 deal with Trésor Mputu.

=== 2018–19 penalties ===
Old logo

Kabuscorp forfeited 9 points, for failing to address payment claims by a total 6 individuals, following a 15-day deadline stipulated by the Angolan Football Federation (FAF). The first case includes former player Adawá Mokanga, the second case includes former staff members Afonso Paxe Filho, Dombasi João, Kutama Shabani and former head-coach Romeu Filemón whereas the third case refers to former club physician Dr. Caetano Maria.

In May, the Angolan Football Federation received a letter from FIFA ordering Kabuscorp to be relegated for failing to meet payment claims by former player Rivaldo. Even though the debt has reportedly been paid in full, Kabuscorp failed to pay within the established deadline. The club faced a second relegation penalty regarding their dispute with TP Mazembe.

=== Dissolution ===
On 12 March 2022, the club's president Bento Kangamba announced the club would forfeit from Girabola and would be dissolved, due to the constant penalties applied by the Angolan Football Federation.

== Notable players ==
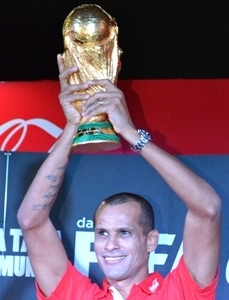
Rivaldo, who joined Kabuscorp in 2012, with the prestigious FIFA World Cup trophy

On January 15, 2012, the 1999 FIFA World Player of the Year and 1999 Ballon d'Or Rivaldo, signed a one-year contract with the club.

Albert Meyong, was a decisive player in Kabuscorp's first titles being the club's top scorer.

== Achievements ==
- Angolan League: 1
  - 2013
- Angolan SuperCup: 1
  - 2014
  - Angola CUP 2024-25:1

== Recent seasons ==
Kasburcop's season-by-season performance since 2015:
As of 5 November 2017

Overall match statistics
Season	Pld	W	D	L	GF	GA	GD	%
2017	35	15	12	8	49	39	+10	0.543
2016	31	13	7	11	30	24	+6	0.597
2015	36	14	16	6	39	28	+11	0.472

Classifications
LG	AC	SC	CL	CC
4th	QF	–	–	–
5th	R16	–	–	–
4th	QF	–	R16	–

Top season scorers
Player	LG	AC	SC	CL	CC	T
Jacques, Lami	9	1	–	–	–	10
Mano	7	0	–	–	–	7
Meyong	13	1	–	2	–	16

- PR = Preliminary round, 1R = First round, GS = Group stage, R32 = Round of 32, R16 = Round of 16, QF = Quarter-finals, SF = Semi-finals

== Performance in CAF competitions ==
- CAF Champions League: 1 appearance
  - 2014 – First Round

== Staff ==
Name	Nat	Pos
Technical staff
Francisco Kamwanga	(Angola)	Head coach
Nuno Tchikunda	(Angola)	Assistant coach
Altino Ndulu	(Angola)	Goalkeeper coach
Medical
Evaristo Ngalula	(Angola)	Physician
Rúben Ngunza	(Angola)	Physio
Management
Bento Kangamba	(Angola)	Owner

== Manager history ==
Season	Coach	S	L	C	Coach	S	L	C	Coach	S	L	C
1996	(Democratic Republic of the Congo) Kidumo Pedro											
1997	(Democratic Republic of the Congo) Kidumo Pedro											
1998	(Democratic Republic of the Congo) Kidumo Pedro											
1999
2000
2001
2002
2003
2004
2005
2006
2007
2008	(Democratic Republic of the Congo) Afonso Kondi				(Democratic Republic of the Congo) Kiadivila Nkolay Zico				(Democratic Republic of the Congo) Kidumu Pedro			
2009	(Democratic Republic of the Congo) Afonso Kondi				(Democratic Republic of the Congo) Kidumu Pedro				(Serbia) Draško Stojiljković			
2010	(Serbia) Draško Stojiljković											
2011	(Russia) Viktor Bondarenko											
2012	(Russia) Viktor Bondarenko				(Bulgaria) Eduard Eranosyan							
2013	(Bulgaria) Eduard Eranosyan		2013 Girabola									
2014	(Bulgaria) Eduard Eranosyan	2014 Angola Super Cup			(Serbia) Zoran Manojlović							
2015	(Serbia) Ljubomir Ristovski				(Angola) Miller Gomes							
2016	(Angola) Miller Gomes				(Angola) Mateus Bodunha				(Angola) Romeu Filemón			
2017	(Angola) Romeu Filemón											
2018	(Portugal) Sérgio Traguil				(Serbia) Kosta Papić							
2019	(Portugal) Paulo Torres											

== See also ==
- Kabuscorp Handball
- Girabola
- Gira Angola
- List of Kabuscorp S.C.P. players
