= Atlético Petróleos de Luanda =

Association football club in Angola

Petro de Luanda
- Full name: Atlético Petróleos de Luanda
- Nicknames: Os Tricolores; Os Petrolíferos
- Founded: 14 January 1980; 46 years ago
- Ground: Estádio 11 de Novembro, Luanda, Angola
- Capacity: 48,500
- President: Tomás Faria
- Manager: João Pedro Sousa
- League: Girabola
- 2025–26: 1st
- Website: www.petroatletico.co.ao
Home colours	Away colours	Third colours

Atlético Petróleos de Luanda, also known as Petro Atlético de Luanda, or simply Petro Atlético or Petro de Luanda, is a football club from Luanda, Angola, founded in 1980. The club won its first title, the Angolan League, in 1982 and is the most successful team in the country.

In its initial days, the club was known as Petroclube.

Four players from Petro Atlético represented Angola at their first World Cup in 2006: Lebo Lebo, Lamá, Zé Kalanga and Delgado.

The club has also a basketball team. Many basketball players of the team, participated with Angola national basketball team in the Olympics 2008.

== Honours ==
- Girabola: 20
  - 1982, 1984, 1986, 1987, 1988, 1989, 1990, 1993, 1994, 1995, 1997, 2000, 2001, 2008, 2009, 2021–22, 2022–23, 2023–24, 2024–25, 2025–26
- Angola Cup: 15
  - 1987, 1992, 1993, 1994, 1997, 1998, 2000, 2002, 2012, 2013, 2017, 2020–21, 2021–22, 2022–23, 2023–24
- Angola Super Cup: 6
  - 1987, 1988, 1993, 1994, 2002, 2013

First lineup in official competition

First lineup in Girabola – 9/5/1981

== Recent seasons ==
Petro de Luanda's season-by-season performance since 2001:
As of 2 October 2023

Overall match statistics
Season	Pld	W	D	L	GF	GA	GD	%
2022–23	43	32	5	6	90	22	+68	0.814
2021–22	48	31	14	3	101	37	+64	0.677
2020–21	45	28	7	10	61	29	+32	0.733
2019–20	36	18	14	4	57	28	+29	0.556
2018–19	45	28	9	8	60	24	+36	0.711
2018	32	15	14	3	44	17	+27	0.516
2017	33	22	3	8	49	21	+28	0.788
2016	33	21	7	5	42	17	+25	0.712
2015	33	12	8	13	29	31	–2	0.561
2014	43	19	11	13	63	41	+22	0.593
2013	38	18	9	11	46	29	+17	0.618
2012	–	–	–	–	–	–	+	–
2011	–	–	–	–	–	–	+	–

Classifications
GB	AC	SC	CL	CC
1st	1st	–	GS	-
1st	1st	–	SF	-
2nd	1st	–	GS	-
-	-	–	GS	-
2nd	SF	–	–	GS
2nd	–	–	–	R1
2nd	1st	–	–	–
2nd	SF			
8th	SF			
5th	2nd	RU		
4th	1st	W		
3rd	1st			
3rd	R32			R16

Top season scorers
Player	LG	AC	SC	CL	CC	T
Azulão	20	2	–	5	-	27
Azulão	21	4	–	7	-	32
Azulão	16	1	–	2	-	19
António Rosa Ribeiro	14	1	–	3	-	18
Azulão	13	2	–	–	5	20
Azulão	20	–	–	–	1	21
Azulão	15	3	–	–	–	18
Azulão	9	1	–	–	–	10
Job	6	1	–	–	1	7
Ladji Keita	13	2	0	–	4	19
Ladji Keita	8	5	0	–	0	13
Kembua	10		–	–	–	
Love	20		–	–	–	

- PR = Preliminary round, R1 = First round, GS = Group stage, R32 = Round of 32, R16 = Round of 16, QF = Quarter-finals, SF = Semi-finals, RU = Runner-Up, W = Winner

== Performance in CAF competitions ==
- CAF Champions League: 7 appearances

1998 – Second Round
2001 – Semi-Finals
2002 – First Round
2004 – Third Round
2007 – First Round
2009 – First Round
2010 – Second Round
2019−20 – Group Stage
2020−21 – Group Stage
2021−22 – Semi-Finals

- African Cup of Champions Clubs: 9 appearances

1983: Second Round
1985: First Round
1987: First Round
1988: Second Round
1989: First Round
1990: First Round
1991: Second Round
1994: First Round
1995: First Round

- CAF Confederation Cup: 7 appearances

2004 – Group Stage
2006 – Group Stage
2008 – First Round
2010 – Second Round of 16
2013 – First Round
2014 – Second Round of 16
2015 –

- CAF Cup: 1 appearance

1997 – Finalist

- CAF Cup Winners' Cup: 4 appearances

1992 – First Round
1993 – Second Round
1999 – First Round
2003 – First Round

== Logo ==
At a General Assembly meeting held on June 27, 2020, it was decided that the former logo should be reinstated with a few minor adjustments.

== Players and staff ==
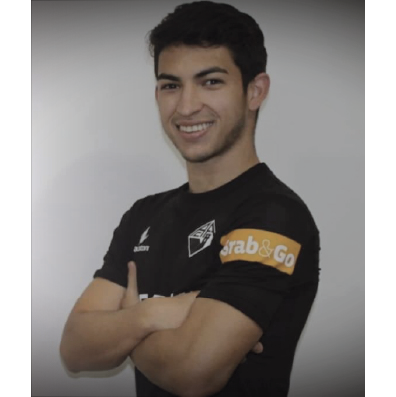
Jonathan Toro, who played numerous games for Honduras, joined Atlético Petróleos de Luanda in 2023

=== Squad ===
As of 24 September 2026

Note: Flags indicate national team as defined under FIFA eligibility rules; some limited exceptions apply. Players may hold more than one non-FIFA nationality.

No.	Pos.	Nation	Player
1	GK	ANG	Hugo Marques
2	DF	ANG	Núrio Fortuna
4	DF	ANG	Rúben Adérito
5	DF	BRA	Léo Bolgado
7	FW	ANG	Ivan Cavaleiro
8	MF	HON	Jonathan Toro
9	FW	ANG	Lucas João
10	MF	POR	Pedro Aparício
11	FW	ANG	Hélder Costa
12	MF	HON	Deiby Flores
13	FW	ANG	Berna
17	FW	ANG	Vanilson
18	DF	ANG	Vidinho
19	FW	ANG	Jó Paciência
20	MF	POR	Jorge Pereira

No.	Pos.	Nation	Player
22	GK	ANG	Augusto Mualucano
23	FW	BRA	Tiago Reis
24	DF	ANG	Kinito
25	DF	ANG	Eddie Afonso
26	FW	BRA	Tiago Azulão (captain)
27	DF	ANG	António Hossi
29	FW	ANG	Depú
33	FW	ANG	Ilídio
34	MF	ANG	Jairo Muanha
35	FW	ANG	Valter Monteiro
36	FW	ANG	Gigal
37	MF	ANG	Maya
—	GK	ANG	Neblú
—	MF	ANG	Mário Balbúrdia

=== Staff ===
Name	Nationality	Position(s)
Technical staff
Flávio Amado	(Angola)	Head coach
José Nhwengo	(Angola)	Assistant coach
Cristóvão M'Bala	(Angola)	Assistant coach
Medical
Rodolfo Muleka	(Angola)	Physician
Francisco Chipenga	(Angola)	Physio
António Mbuyamba	(Angola)	Masseur
Management
Tomás Faria	(Angola)	Chairman
Filipe Nkosi	(Angola)	Vice-chairman
Daniel Lungu	(Angola)	Head of Foot Dept

== Manager history ==
Season	Coach	S	L	C	Coach	S	L	C	Coach	S	L	C
1980	(Bulgaria) Vassili Moratev Vesco											
1981	(Brazil) Antônio Clemente											
1982	(Brazil) Antônio Clemente			1982 Girabola								
1983	(Brazil) Antônio Clemente											
1984	(Angola) Carlos Queirós				(Angola) Severino Miranda Smica †		1984 Girabola					
1985	(Brazil) Alfredo Abraão											
1986	(Brazil) Alfredo Abraão				(Angola) Carlos Silva		1986 Girabola					
1987	(Angola) Carlos Silva				(Angola) Carlos Queirós				(Brazil) Antônio Clemente	1987 Angola SuperCup	1987 Girabola	1987 Angola Cup
1988	(Brazil) Antônio Clemente	1988 Angola SuperCup	1988 Girabola									
1989	(Angola) Carlos Queirós		1989 Girabola									
1990	(Angola) Carlos Queirós				(Brazil) Antônio Clemente				(Angola) Carlos Queirós	1990 Girabola		
1991	(Angola) Carlos Queirós											
1992	(Serbia) Gojko Zec			1992 Angola Cup								
1993	(Serbia) Gojko Zec	1993 Angola SuperCup	1993 Girabola	1993 Angola Cup								
1994	(Serbia) Gojko Zec	1994 Angola SuperCup	1994 Girabola	1994 Angola Cup								
1995	(Serbia) Gojko Zec				(Angola) Jesus Saturnino		1995 Girabola					
1996	(Angola) António Lopes Chiby											
1997	(Angola) António Lopes Chiby				(Brazil) Jorge Ferreira		1997 Girabola	1997 Angola Cup				
1998	(Brazil) Jorge Ferreira			1998 Angola Cup								
1999	(Serbia) Dragan Popadić				(Brazil) Djalma Cavalcante							
2000	(Brazil) Djalma Cavalcante		2000 Girabola	2000 Angola Cup								
2001	(Brazil) Djalma Cavalcante		2001 Girabola									

Season	Coach	S	L	C	Coach	S	L	C
2002	(Brazil) José Roberto Ávilas	2002 Angola SuperCup		2002 Angola Cup				
2003	(Netherlands) Jan Brouwer							
2004	(Netherlands) Jan Brouwer				(Brazil) Antônio Clemente			
2005	(Brazil) Arthur Bernardes				(Cape Verde) Carlos Alhinho			
2006	(Cape Verde) Carlos Alhinho				(Brazil) Djalma Cavalcante			
2007	(Portugal) Bernardino Pedroto							
2008	(Portugal) Bernardino Pedroto		2008 Girabola					
2009	(Portugal) Bernardino Pedroto		2009 Girabola					
2010	(Portugal) Bernardino Pedroto				(Serbia) Miroslav Maksimović			
2011	(Serbia) Miroslav Maksimović							
2012	(Serbia) Miroslav Maksimović				(Angola) Miller Gomes			2012 Angola Cup
2013	(Angola) Miller Gomes	2013 Angola SuperCup			(Portugal) José Dinis			2013 Angola Cup
2014	(Brazil) Alexandre Grasseli							
2015	(Brazil) Alexandre Grasseli							
2016	(Brazil) Beto Bianchi							
2017	(Brazil) Beto Bianchi			2017 Angola Cup				
2018	(Brazil) Beto Bianchi							
2018-19	(Brazil) Beto Bianchi				(Spain) Toni Cosano			
2019-20	(Spain) Toni Cosano							
2020-21	(Spain) Toni Cosano				(Angola) Mateus Agostinho Bodunha			2020-21 Angola Cup
2021-22	(Portugal) Alexandre Santos	2021-22 Girabola						
2022–23	(Portugal) Alexandre Santos							

== Chairman history ==
- Tomás Faria – 2014–present
- Mateus de Brito † – 2012–2014
- Cardoso Pereira – 2008–2011
- Paulo Gouveia Júnior – 2004–2007
- Silva Neto – 1999–2003
- Botelho de Vasconcelos – 1990–1999

== Other sports ==
- Petro Atlético Basketball
- Petro Atlético Handball
- Petro Atlético Hockey

== See also ==
- Girabola
- Gira Angola
