= C.D. Primeiro de Agosto in international football =

This article aims at providing details on the participation and performance of Clube Desportivo Primeiro de Agosto at the various competitions organized by the Confederation of African Football, namely the CAF Champions League, the CAF Confederation Cup and the former CAF Cup and CAF Winner's Cup as well as international tournaments and friendlies.

Primeiro de Agosto has a total 24 participations in CAF-sponsored competitions, including 12 in the CAF Champions League, five in the African Cup of Champions Clubs, three in the CAF Cup Winners' Cup and two in both the CAF Confederation Cup and the CAF Cup.

In 1998, the club reached the final of the CAF Cup Winners' Cup, having finished as the runner-up. In 1997 and 2009, they reached the group stage of the CAF Champions League and of the CAF Confederation Cup, respectively.

In 2018, they reached the semi-finals of the champions league, where they were eliminated in a second-leg 4-2 defeat to Espérance Tunis, a match that included an alleged biased officiating performance by referee Janny Sikazwe.

Total participations
Champions League: 13 (1997, 1999, 2000, 2007, 2008, 2009, 2013, 2014, 2017, 2018, 2018–19, 2019–20, 2020–21
African Cup of Champions Clubs: 5 (1980, 1981, 1982, 1992, 1993)
Confederation Cup: 4 (2009, 2010, 2011, 2021–22)
Cup Winners' Cup: 3 (1985, 1991, 1998)
CAF Cup: 2 (1996, 2003)
Results summary

| Overall | | | | | | | | Home | | | | | | Away | | | | | |
| Pld | W | D | L | GF | GA | GD | Pts | W | D | L | GF | GA | GD | W | D | L | GF | GA | GD |
|---|---|---|---|---|---|---|---|---|---|---|---|---|---|---|---|---|---|---|---|
| 127 | 54 | 29 | 44 | 173 | 152 | +21 | 191 | 38 | 18 | 7 | 116 | 40 | +76 | 16 | 11 | 37 | 57 | 112 | −55 |

Last updated: 24 October 2021.

Stats
largest win – D'Agosto (Angola) 7–0 (Namibia) Black Africa (03 Feb 1991)
largest loss – H. El Hodoud (Egypt) 5–1 (Angola) D'Agosto (20 Feb 2009)

Goal scorers

As of 24 October 2021

- (9 goals) Bena, Moisés I, Muanza
- (8 goals) Isaac Lokuli
- (7 goals) Geraldo
- (6 goals) Assis, Mabululu, Mateus Fuidimau
- (5 goals) Jacques, Mongo, Opponents
- (4 goals) Amaro, Fofaná, Love, Ndisso, Nsilulu
- (3 goals) Ary Papel, Dé, Harry Milanzi, Julião Kutonda, Mendonça, Moisés II, Moya
- (2 goals) Agó, Barbosa, Bolefo, Buá, Castella, Filipe Nzanza, Guilherme Afonso, Loth, Lourenço, Mano Calesso, Roger Brito, Russo, Vieira Dias
- (1 goal) Alberto, Alfred, Alves, Bobo, Dani Massunguna, David, James Sangala, Jó Vidal, Kabamba, Kila, Kiss, Lionel, Lucas Simão, Lucau, Luís Carlos, Makita, Mateus Galiano, Mbila, Mingo Bile, Ndunguidi, Nsuka, Pena, Pilolas, Ramaphoko, Roberto, Stopirrá, Tandu, Tuabi, Zacarias, Zé Augusto, Zini

AS Otoho 2-0 D'Agosto

== 2020–21 Champions League ==
| Tue, 05 Jan 2021 R1 2L | 1º de Agosto (Angola) | 0–1 | (South Africa) Kaizer Chiefs | Luanda |
| 16:00 WAT (UTC+1) | | | 41' Castro | Stadium: 11 de Novembro |
Note: Tony Cabaça (c) / Bobo, Isaac (substituted off) 85', Natael, Bonifácio (substituted off) 71' / Buá (substituted off) 45', Macaia, Mário, Manico (substituted off) 58' / Mabululu (substituted off) 85', Moya — Atouba (substituted on) 45', Giovani (substituted on) 58', Zini (substituted on) 71', Mongo (substituted on) 85', Mira (substituted on) 85'

| Wed, 23 Dec 2020 R1 1L | Kaizer Chiefs (South Africa) | 0–0 | (Angola) 1º de Agosto | Johannesburg |
| 18:00 SAST (UTC+2) | | | | Stadium: FNB Stadium; Referee: Ibrahim Tsimanohitsy, Andriatianarivelo, Harizo (Madagascar) |
Note: Neblú / Bobo, Isaac, Jó, Natael / Atouba (substituted off) 87', Boni, Herenilson, Mongo (c) (substituted off) 74' / Mabululu (substituted off) 74', Moya (substituted off) 90+5' — Mário (substituted on) 74', Zini (substituted on) 74', Macaia (substituted on) 87', Manico (substituted on) 90+5'

== 2019–20 Champions League ==
| Sat, 01 Feb 2020 GA R1 1L | 1º de Agosto (Angola) | 0–0 | (Egypt) Zamalek | Luanda |
| 14:00 WAT (UTC+1) | | Report | | Stadium: 11 de Novembro; Referee: Tsegay Teklu (Eritrea); Eyobel Ghebru, Yohannes Tewelde |
Note: Neblú / Bobo, Dani (c), Natael, Paizo / Ary Papel, Ibukun, Kila (substituted off) 69', Mário (substituted off) 83' / Lionel (substituted off) 45', Mabululu — Buá (substituted on) 45', Mongo (substituted on) 69', Macaia (substituted on) 83'

| Sat, 25 Jan 2020 FR 1L | ZESCO United (Zambia) | 1–1 | (Angola) 1º de Agosto | Ndola |
| 18:00 CAT (UTC+2) | Kalengo 49' | | 66' Ary Papel | Stadium: Levy Mwanawasa; Referee: Mehdi Charef (Algeria); Bouabdalah Omari, Abbes Zerhouni |
Note: Neblú / Bobo, Dani (c), Isaac, Natael / Ary Papel, Ibukun (substituted off) 78', Macaia, Mário (substituted off) 45', Nelson (substituted off) 54' / Mabululu — Kila (substituted on) 45', Buá (substituted on) 54', Lionel (substituted on) 78'

| Sat, 11 Jan 2020 FR 1L | TP Mazembe (Democratic Republic of the Congo) | 2–1 | (Angola) 1º de Agosto | Lubumbashi |
| 15:00 CAT (UTC+2) | Muleka 58', 67' | | 8' Mabululu | Stadium: TP Mazembe; Referee: Souleiman Djama (Guinea); Assts: Salah Mohamed, Mohamed Guedi (Djibouti) |
Note: Neblú / Bobo, Dani (c) (substituted off) 79', Isaac (substituted off) 66', Natael / Ary Papel, Macaia, Mário, Nelson / Kila (substituted off) 57', Mabululu — Paizo (substituted on) 57', Buá (substituted on) 66', Mongo (substituted on) 79'

| Fri, 27 Dec 2019 GA R1 1L | 1º de Agosto (Angola) | 1–1 | (Democratic Republic of the Congo) TP Mazembe | Luanda |
| 17:00 WAT (UTC+1) | Mabululu 11' | Report | 7' Kalaba | Stadium: 11 de Novembro; Referee: Andofetra Rakotojaona (Madagascar); Assts: Lionel Andrianantenaina, Randrianarivelo Harizo |
Note: Tony / Bobo, Dani (c), Isaac, Paizo / Atouba (substituted off) 75', Kila (substituted off) 69', Ibukun, Macaia (substituted off) 85' / Ary Papel, Mabululu — Buá (substituted on) 69', Zito (substituted on) 75', Mongo (substituted on) 85'

| Sat, 07 Dec 2019 FR 1L | Zamalek (Egypt) | 2–0 | (Angola) 1º de Agosto | Cairo |
| 18:00 EST (UTC+2) | Bencharki 16', 67' | | (yellow card) 39' (yellow-red card) 70' Ibukun | Stadium: Cairo International; Referee: Louis Hakizimana (Rwanda) |
Note: Tony / Bobo, Dani (c), Isaac, Natael / Atouba, Buá (substituted off) 73', Kila (substituted off) 45', Ibukun / Ary Papel, Mabululu (substituted off) 75' — Zito (substituted on) 45', Bonifácio (substituted on) 73', Mongo (substituted on) 75'

| Fri, 29 Nov 2019 GA R1 1L | 1º de Agosto (Angola) | 1–1 | (Zambia) ZESCO United | Luanda |
| 17:00 WAT (UTC+1) | Mabululu 9' | Report | 16' Mwape | Stadium: 11 de Novembro; Referee: Andofetra Rakotojaona (Madagascar); Assts: Lionel Andrianantenaina, Randrianarivelo Harizo |
Note: Tony / Bobo, Dani (c), Isaac, Paizo / Atouba (substituted off) 75', Kila (substituted off) 69', Ibukun, Macaia (substituted off) 85' / Ary Papel, Mabululu — Buá (substituted on) 69', Zito (substituted on) 75', Mongo (substituted on) 85'

| Sat, 28 Sep 2019 FR 2L | 1º de Agosto (Angola) | 0–1 | (Zambia) Green Eagles | Luanda |
| 00:00 WAT (UTC+1) | | | 43' Kaseba | Stadium: 11 de Novembro; Referee: Bamlak Weyesa (Ethiopia); Temesgin Atango, |
Note: Tony / Bobo, Dani (c), Isaac, Paizo / Ary Papel, Ibukun, Kila (substituted off) 86', Macaia / Mabululu (substituted off) 83', Zito (substituted off) 74' — Buá (substituted on) 74', Lionel (substituted on) 83', Nelson (substituted on) 86'

| Sat, 14 Sep 2019 FR 1L | Green Eagles (Zambia) | 1–2 | (Angola) 1º de Agosto | Lusaka |
| 00:00 CAT (UTC+2) | Shamende 76' | | 28' Mabululu; 85' Kila | Stadium: Nkoloma Stadium; Referee: Victor Gomes (South Africa); Assts: Zakhele Siwela, Kgara Mokoena |
Note: Tony / Bobo, Dani (c), Isaac, Paizo / Ary Papel, Ibukun, Kila, Macaia / Mabululu (substituted off) 78', Zito (substituted off) 72' — Lionel (substituted on) 78', Nelson (substituted on)

| Sat, 24 Aug 2019 PR 2L | 1º de Agosto (Angola) | 2–0 | (Zanzibar) KMKM | Luanda |
| 17:00 WAT (UTC+1) | Mabululu 34', 68' (pen.) | Report | | Stadium: 11 de Novembro; Referee: Victor Gomes (South Africa); Assts: Zakhele Siwela, Kgara Mokoena |
Note: Tony / Bobo, Dani (c), Isaac (substituted off) 83', Paizo / Catraio, Kila (substituted off) 78', Macaia, Nelson / Mabululu, Zito (substituted off) 72' — Mário (substituted on) 72', Melono (substituted on) 78', Cirilo (substituted on) 83'

| Sat, 10 Aug 2019 PR 1L | KMKM (Zanzibar) | 0–2 | (Angola) 1º de Agosto | Zanzibar |
| 16:15 EAT (UTC+3) | | Report | 71' Ary Papel; 90+1' Lionel | Stadium: Amaan Stadium; Referee: Ali Chelanget (Uganda); Assts: Mark Ssonko, Isa Masembe |
Note: Tony / Bobo, Dani (c), Isaac, Paizo / Ary, Ibukun, Macaia, Nelson / Mabululu, Zito — Lionel (substituted on)

== 2018–19 Champions League ==
| Wed, 05 Dec 2018 PR 2L | AS Otôho (Republic of the Congo) | 2–0 | (Angola) 1º de Agosto | Owando |
| 15:30 WAT (UTC+1) | Bagayoko 45+2' (pen.); Mbenza 90+2' | Report | | Stadium: Marien Ngouabi; Referee: Pierre Atcho (Gabon); Angelo Mambana, Felix Eyaga |
Note: Tony / Bobo, Dani (c), Isaac (substituted off) 75', Paizo / Geraldo (substituted off) 60', Macaia, Mongo, Show / Jacques, Mabululu (substituted off) 87' — Mingo Bile (substituted on) 60', Yisa (substituted on) 75', Mário (substituted on) 87'

| Wed, 28 Nov 2018 PR 1L | 1º de Agosto (Angola) | 4–2 | (Republic of the Congo) AS Otôho | Luanda |
| 16:00 WAT (UTC+1) | Mongo 29'; Geraldo 37' (pen.), 60'; Jacques 88' | Report | 22' Kivutuka; 25' Konte | Stadium: 11 de Novembro; Referee: Ganesh Chutooree (Mauritius); Sailesh Gobin, Akhtar Rossaye |
Note: Tony / Bobo, Dani (c), Guelor (substituted off) 46', Isaac / Ary, Buá, Geraldo (substituted off) 65', Show / Mabululu (substituted off) 74', Mongo — Mingo Bile (substituted on) 46', Aquino (substituted on) 65', Jacques (substituted on) 74'

== 2018 Champions League ==
=== Espérance vs D'Agosto ===
The heavily biased performance of Zambian referee Janny Sikazwe positively prevented D'Agosto from reaching the finals. The renowned referee had a disgraceful performance during the entire match, completely ignoring the rules of the game and clearly siding with the home team. The ice on the cake of his performance occurred shortly before Espérance's final goal, when D'Agosto scored but he inexplicably disallowed the goal on a would-be push to the Tunisian goal-keeper. In the aftermath, Sikazwe was suspended by CAF on suspicion of corruption.

| Tue, 23 Oct 2018 SF 2L | Espérance (Tunisia) | 4–2 | (Angola) 1º de Agosto | Radès |
| 17:00 CET (UTC+1) | Belaïli 15' (pen.); Yacoubi 26'; Jouini 67'; Badri 83' | | 7' Geraldo; 57' Mongo | Stadium: Stade Olympique; Referee: Janny Sikazwe (Zambia); Romeo Kasengele, Kab Chansa |
Note: Tony / Bobo, Dani (c), Mingo Bile, Paizo / Geraldo, Ibukun (substituted off) 46', Macaia, Show / Mongo (substituted off) 69', Razaq (substituted off) 83' — Mário (substituted on) 46', Guelor (substituted on) 69', Jacques (substituted on) 83'

| Tue, 02 Oct 2018 SF 1L | 1º de Agosto (Angola) | 1–0 | (Tunisia) Espérance | Luanda |
| 17:00 WAT (UTC+1) | Buá 79' | | | Stadium: 11 de Novembro; Referee: Maguette Ndiaye (Senegal); Djibril Camara, Hadji Samba |
Note: Tony / Bobo, Dani (c), Isaac, Paizo / Geraldo, Ibukun (substituted off) 88', Macaia, Show / Jacques (substituted off) 76', Mongo (substituted off) 69' — Buá (substituted on) 69', Razaq (substituted on) 76', Yisa (substituted on) 88'

| Fri, 21 Sep 2018 QF 2L | TP Mazembe (Democratic Republic of the Congo) | 1–1 | (Angola) 1º de Agosto | Lubumbashi |
| 15:00 CAT (UTC+2) | Muleka 12' | | 32' Mongo | Stadium: TP Mazembe; Referee: Mehdi Charef (Algeria); Abdelhak Etchiali, Mokrane Gourari |
Note: Tony / Bobo, Dani (c), Isaac, Paizo / Geraldo, Ibukun (substituted off) 90+2', Macaia, Show (substituted off) 75' / Jacques, Mongo (substituted off) 83' — Yisa (substituted on) 75', Mário (substituted on) 83', Buá (substituted on) 90+2'

| Sat, 15 Sep 2018 QF 1L | 1º de Agosto (Angola) | 0–0 | (Democratic Republic of the Congo) TP Mazembe | Luanda |
| 17:00 WAT (UTC+1) | | | | Stadium: 11 de Novembro; Referee: Rédouane Jiyed (Morocco); Yahya Nouali, Essam Benpapa |
Note: Tony / Bobo, Dani (c), Guelor, Isaac (substituted off) 59' / Ibukun, Mário, Mingo Bile, Show (substituted off) 61' / Jacques (substituted off) 77', Mongo — Buá (substituted on) 59', Macaia (substituted on) 61', Razaq (substituted on) 77'

| Tue, 28 Aug 2018 GD R3 2L | 1º de Agosto (Angola) | 2–1 | (Eswatini) Mbabane Swallows | Luanda |
| 14:00 WAT (UTC+1) | Jacques 33'; Geraldo 37' | Report | 57' Aladeokun | Stadium: 11 de Novembro; Referee: Ahmad Heeralall (Mauritius); Cauvelet Fabien, Ram Babajee |
Note: Tony / Bobo, Dani (c), Mingo Bile (substituted off) 77', Paizo / Geraldo, Ibukun, Mário (substituted off) 60', Show / Jacques, Mongo (substituted off) 80' — Macaia (substituted on) 60', Isaac (substituted on) 77', Buá (substituted on) 80'

| Sat, 18 Aug 2018 GD R2 2L | Étoile du Sahel (Tunisia) | 1–1 | (Angola) 1º de Agosto | Sousse |
| 00:00 CET (UTC+1) | Chermiti 87' | Report | 12' Dani | Stadium: Stade Olympique; Referee: Jean-Jacques Ngambo (DR Congo); Olivier Kabene, Soulaimane Amaldine |
Note: Tony / Bobo, Dani (c), Guelor, Yisa / Ibukun, Mário (substituted off) 72', Mingo Bile (substituted off) 83', Show / Jacques, Mongo (substituted off) 62' — Fofó (substituted on) 62', Isaac (substituted on) 72', Macaia (substituted on) 83'

| Fri, 27 Jul 2018 GD R1 2L | 1º de Agosto (Angola) | 2–1 | (Zambia) ZESCO United | Luanda |
| 17:00 WAT (UTC+1) | Geraldo 90'; Bobo 90+7' | Report | 66' Ching'andu | Stadium: 11 de Novembro; Referee: Bernard Camille (Seychelles); Hensley Petrousse, James Emile |
Note: Tony / Bobo, Dani (c), Isaac, Paizo (substituted off) 72' / Ibukun, Mário (substituted off) 54', Mongo, Show / Jacques (substituted off) 55', Razaq — Buá (substituted on) 54', Geraldo (substituted on) 55', Guelor (substituted on) 72'

| Tue, 17 Jul 2018 GD R3 1L | ZESCO United (Zambia) | 0–0 | (Angola) 1º de Agosto | Ndola |
| 15:00 CAT (UTC+2) | | Report | | Stadium: Levy Mwanawasa; Referee: Bamlak Weyesa (Ethiopia); Temesgin Atango, Kindie Mussie |
Note: Tony / Bobo, Dani (c), Guelor, Yisa / Geraldo (substituted off) 42', Ibukun, Mingo Bile (substituted off) 70', Mongo (substituted off) 83', Show / Razaq — Isaac (substituted on) 42', Paizo (substituted on) 70', Buá (substituted on) 83'

| Tue, 15 May 2018 GD R2 1L | Mbabane Swallows (Eswatini) | 1–0 | (Angola) 1º de Agosto | Manzini |
| 15:00 SAST (UTC+2) | Badenhorst 59' | Report | | Stadium: Mavuso; Referee: Souleiman Djamal (Djibouti); Farhan Salime, Salah Mohamed |
Note: Neblú / Bobo, Dani (c), Isaac, Paizo / Bonifácio (substituted off) 64', Geraldo, Ibukun, Macaia (substituted off) 79' / Jacques, Mongo (substituted off) 78' — Fofó (substituted on) 64', Guelor (substituted on) 78', Buá (substituted on) 79'

| Sat, 05 May 2018 GD R1 1L | 1º de Agosto (Angola) | 1–1 | (Tunisia) Étoile du Sahel | Luanda |
| 17:00 WAT (UTC+1) | Mongo 41' | Report | 65' Jemal | Stadium: 11 de Novembro; Referee: Rédouane Jiyed (Morocco); Hicham Abbou, Yahya Nouali |
Note: Neblú / Bobo, Dani (c), Isaac, Paizo / Geraldo, Ibukun (substituted off) 83', Macaia, Fofó (substituted off) 71' / Jacques, Mongo (substituted off) 78' — Buá (substituted on) 71', Show (substituted on) 78', Nelson (substituted on) 83'

| Fri, 16 Mar 2018 FR 2L | Bidvest Wits (South Africa) | 1–0 (2–3 p) | (Angola) 1º de Agosto | Johannesburg |
| 15:00 SAST (UTC+2) | Dominguês 80' | Report | | Stadium: Bidvest; Referee: Hassan Hagi (Somalia); Hamza Abdi, Bashir Suleiman |
| | Penalties |
| | Majoro (penalty missed); Dominguês (penalty missed); Klate (penalty missed); Frosler (penalty scored); Claasen (penalty scored) | | (penalty scored) Isaac; (penalty missed) Ibukun; (penalty missed) Natael; (penalty scored) Paizo; (penalty scored) Geraldo |
Note: Neblú (substituted off) 90+2' / Bobo, Dani (c) (substituted off) 25', Isaac, Natael / Geraldo, Ibukun, Macaia, Show / Jacques, Mongo (substituted off) 70' — Yisa (substituted on) 25', Paizo (substituted on) 70', Tony (substituted on) 90+2'

| Wed, 07 Mar 2018 FR 1L | 1º de Agosto (Angola) | 1–0 | (South Africa) Bidvest Wits | Luanda |
| 16:00 WAT (UTC+1) | Geraldo 86' | Report | | Stadium: 11 de Novembro; Referee: Antoine Essouma (Cameroon); Elvis Nguegoue, Ernest Ekokobe |
Note: Neblú / Bobo, Dani (c), Isaac, Natael / Geraldo, Ibukun (substituted off) 90', Nelson (substituted off) 65', Show / Jacques, Mongo (substituted off) 81' — Buá (substituted on) 65', Fofó (substituted on) 81', Macaia (substituted on) 90'

| Wed, 21 Feb 2018 PR 2L | FC Platinum (Zimbabwe) | 1–2 | (Angola) 1º de Agosto | Zvishavane |
| 15:00 CAT (UTC+2) | Chinyengetere 65' | Report | 54' (o.g.) Mhango; 90+3' Jacques | Stadium: Mandava; Referee: Christofer Harrison (South Africa); Athenkosi Ndongeni, John Mervyn |
Note: Neblú / Bobo, Dani (c), Isaac, Natael / Geraldo (substituted off) 90+1', Ibukun, Macaia (substituted off) 80', Show / Jacques, Mongo (substituted off) 71' — Guelor (substituted on) 71', Yisa (substituted on) 80', Mingo Bile (substituted on) 90+1'

| Sun, 11 Feb 2018 PR 1L | 1º de Agosto (Angola) | 3–0 | (Zimbabwe) FC Platinum | Luanda |
| 16:00 WAT (UTC+1) | Mongo 7'; Jacques 54', 61' | Report | | Stadium: 11 de Novembro; Referee: Audrick Nkole (Zambia); Oliver Mweene, Romeo Kasengele |
Note: Neblú / Bobo, Dani (c), Isaac, Natael / Geraldo (substituted off) 85', Gogoró (substituted off) 50', Ibukun, Show / Mongo (substituted off) 75', Jacques — Nelson (substituted on) 50', Buá (substituted on) 75', Fofó (substituted on) 85'

== 2017 Champions League ==
| Sun, 19 Feb 2017 PR 2L | 1º de Agosto (Angola) | 2–1 | (Uganda) Kampala City | Luanda |
| 17:00 WAT (UTC+1) | Buá 31'; Geraldo 38' | Report | 21' Sserunkuma | Stadium: 11 de Novembro; Referee: Lazard Kamba (Congo); Styven Moyo, Blaise Boutamba |
Note: Tony / Bobo, Dani (c), Isaac, Natael / Buá, Ibukun, Meda, Paizo (substituted off) 77' / Geraldo (substituted off) 67', Vado (substituted off) 81' — Gogoró (substituted on) 67', Mingo Bile (substituted on) 77', Nelson (substituted on) 78'

| Fri, 10 Feb 2017 PR 1L | Kampala City (Uganda) | 1–0 | (Angola) 1º de Agosto | Kampala |
| 16:00 EAT (UTC+3) | Sserunkuma 48' | Report | | Stadium: Phillip Omondi; Referee: Israel Mpaima (Kenya); Peter Sabatia, Joshua Achila |
Note: Tony / Bobo, Dani (c), Isaac, Natael / Buá (substituted off) 85', Ibukun, Meda, Nelson (substituted off) 69' / Diogo (substituted off) 58', Geraldo — Vado (substituted on) 58', Gogoró (substituted on) 69', Mingo Bile (substituted on) 85'

== 2014 Champions League ==
| Sat, 08 Mar 2014 R32–2 | 1º de Agosto (Angola) | 2–0 | (Republic of the Congo) AC Léopards | Luanda |
| 16:00 WAT (UTC+1) | Guilherme 3'; Amaro 48' (pen.) | Report | (yellow card) 13' Tseke; (yellow card) 69' Romaric | Stadium: 11 de Novembro; Attendance: 15.000; Referee: Ganesh Chutooree (Mauritius); Balkrishna Bootun, Akhtar Rossaye |
Note: Hugo / Dani, Kuagica (substituted off) 90', Mingo Bile, Paizo / Amaro (substituted off) 75', Chileshe, Manucho (substituted off) 71', Papel / G.Afonso, M.Galiano — Tchitchi (substituted on) 71', Figo (substituted on) 75', Ibukun (substituted on) 90'

| Sun, 02 Mar 2014 R32–1 | AC Léopards (Republic of the Congo) | 4–1 | (Angola) 1º de Agosto | Dolisie |
| 15:30 WAT (UTC+1) | Miangounina 3'; Gandzé 18' 65'; Kalema 54' | | 35' Ary Papel | Stadium: D.S. Nguesso; Referee: Ali Adelaid (Comoros); Hamadi Ibrahim, Soulaimane Amaldine |
Note: Hugo / Dani, Fissy (substituted off) 46', Kuagica, Ndieu / Ary Papel, Chileshe, Manucho, Tchitchi / Figo (substituted off) 57', M.Galiano (substituted off) 46' — Paizo (substituted on) 46', G.Afonso (substituted on) 46', Mingo Bile (substituted on) 57'

| Sun, 16 Feb 2014 PL–2 | Lioli FC (Lesotho) | 2–1 | (Angola) 1º de Agosto | Maseru |
| 15:00 SAST (UTC+2) | Koetle 38' (pen.); Sello 82' | Report | 5' G.Afonso | Stadium: Setsoto Stadium; Referee: Norman Matemera (Zimbabwe); Tapfumanei Mutengwa, Edgar Rumeck |

| Sat, 08 Feb 2014 PL–1 | 1º de Agosto (Angola) | 2–0 | (Lesotho) Lioli FC | Luanda |
| 17:00 WAT (UTC+1) | Amaro 1'; Paizo (yellow card) 29'; Mateus 73' | Report | (yellow card) 89' Lekhanya | Stadium: 11 de Novembro; Referee: Ganesh Chutooree (Seychelles); Balkrishna Bootun, Akhtar Nawaz Rossaye |
Note: Hugo / Dani, Kuagica, Mingo Bile, Paizo / Amaro (substituted off) 86', Chileshe, M.Soares, Tchitchi (substituted off) 70' / G.Afonso, M.Galiano (substituted off) 76' — Buá (substituted on) 70', Papel (substituted on) 76', Figo (substituted on) 86'

== 2013 Champions League ==
| Sat, 06 Apr 2013 R32–2 | Espérance (Tunisia) | 1–0 | (Angola) 1º de Agosto | Tunis |
| 15:00 CET (UTC+1) | Chemmam (yellow card) 75' (goal) 87' (pen.) | | (yellow card) Mingo Bile; (yellow card) Leyzller; (yellow card) 38' Chileshe; (yellow card) 64' Amaro; (yellow card) 65' Kali; (red card) 66' Alfred | Stadium: El Menzah; Attendance: 5.000; Referee: Wahid Tamuni (Libya); Foaad El Maghrabi, Ibrahim Farkash |
Note: Hugo / Kali, Leyzller, Pataca, Simão / Amaro, Chileshe (c), Mingo Bile, Tchitchi (substituted off) 69' / Alfred, Matumona — Kabamba (substituted on) 69'

| Sun, 17 Mar 2013 R32–1 | 1º de Agosto (Angola) | 0–1 | (Tunisia) Espérance | Luanda |
| 15:00 WAT (UTC+1) | Simão (yellow card) | Report | 44' Msakni; (yellow card) Chemmam; (yellow card) Mouelhi | Stadium: Coqueiros; Attendance: 9.000; Referee: Rajindraparsad Seechurn (Mauritius); Vivian Vally, Jean Telvar |
Note: Hugo / Fissy (substituted off) 45', Mingo Bile, Ndieu, Simão (substituted off) 46' / Amaro, Chileshe, Fuky, Manucho / Alfred (substituted off) 52', Matumona — David (substituted on) 45', Kabamba (substituted on) 46', Papel (substituted on) 52'

| Sun, 03 Mar 2013 PL–2 | AS Adema (Madagascar) | 1–0 | (Angola) 1º de Agosto | Antananarivo |
| 16:00 EAT (UTC+3) | Randriamanjaka 87' | Report | (red card) Dani | Stadium: Mahamasina; Referee: Samuel Chirinda (Mozambique); Arsénio Marengula, Olívio Saimone |

| Sat, 16 Feb 2013 PL–1 | 1º de Agosto (Angola) | 4–2 | (Madagascar) AS Adema | Luanda |
| 17:00 WAT (UTC+1) | Alfred 7'; David 32'; Mingo Bile 35'; Kabamba 80' | | 65' (pen.) Bob; 79' Niasexe | Stadium: 11 de Novembro; Referee: Norman Matemera (Zimbabwe); Salani Ncube, Edgar Rumeck |
Note: Neblú / Dani, Fissy, Leyzller, Simão / Amaro (substituted off) 70', Chileshe (substituted off) 79', Manucho, Mingo Bile / Alfred, David (substituted off) 58' — Matumona (substituted on) 58', Ary Papel (substituted on) 70', Kabamba (substituted on) 79'

== 2011 Confederation Cup ==
| Sat, 11 Jun 2011 R16–2 | 1º de Agosto (Angola) | 1–1 | (Ivory Coast) ASEC Mimosas | Luanda |
| 15:30 WAT (UTC+1) | Amaro 80'; Fofaná (yellow card); Manucho (yellow card) | Report | 14' Bakayoko; (yellow card) Yeboah | Stadium: Estádio dos Coqueiros; Attendance: 5.000; Referee: Rajindraparsad Seechurn (Mauritius); Vivian Vally, Vinaye Chutooree |
Note: Wilson / Dani, Elisio, Manucho, Sangala / Amaro, Fofaná (substituted off) J.Vala (substituted on) , J.Martins, Roger (substituted off) Chileshe (substituted on) / Danny, Bena (substituted off) Buá (substituted on)

| Sun, 29 May 2011 R16–1 | ASEC Mimosas (Ivory Coast) | 4–0 | (Angola) 1º de Agosto | Abidjan |
| 17:00 GMT (UTC+0) | Mangoua 27'; Irene 46' (pen.); Bakayoko 60'; Kayode 69'; Dogba (yellow card) 75' | Report | (yellow card) 41' Dani; (yellow card) 46' Elisio; (red card) 48' Kali | Stadium: Robert Champroux; Referee: Djamel Haimoudi (Algeria); Bechirene Choukri, Mounir Bitam |
Note: Wilson (substituted off) 12' / Dani, Elisio, Kali, Mingo Bile / Amaro, Chileshe, Manucho, Roger, Sangala / Fofaná — Bena (substituted on) 12'; D'Agosto flew to Abidjan with only 12 players. At 12 minutes of play, a field player, (the only substitute available) had to replace the goalkeeper who was injured. Furthermore, central back Kali was sent off at nearly half time of playtime.

| Sat, 07 May 2011 pR16–2 | 1º de Agosto (Angola) | 1–0 | (Morocco) FUS de Rabat | Luanda |
| 15:30 WAT (UTC+1) | Amaro 34' (pen.); Mingo Bile (yellow card); Kumaca (yellow card); João Vala (yellow card) | Report | (yellow card) Chafik; (yellow card) Rokki | Stadium: Estádio dos Coqueiros; Attendance: 5.000; Referee: José Rachide (Mozambique); João Paulo, Samuel Chirinda |
Note: Wilson / Dani, Elisio, Kali, Kumaca / Amaro (substituted off) 81', Chileshe, Mingo Bile (substituted off) 65', Sangala / Bena, J. Martins — Fofaná (substituted on) 65', Roger (substituted on) 74', J.Vala (substituted on) 81'

| Sun, 24 Apr 2011 pR16–1 | FUS de Rabat (Morocco) | 1–1 | (Angola) 1º de Agosto | Rabat |
| 15:30 WEST (UTC+1) | Rokki 82' | | 88' Fofaná | Stadium: Prince Moulay Abdellah; Referee: () |

| Sun, 03 Apr 2011 R32–2 | AC Léopards (Republic of the Congo) | 1–0 | (Angola) 1º de Agosto | Dolisie |
| 15:30 WAT (UTC+1) | Lutumu 68' | Report | | Stadium: D.S. Nguesso; Referee: Mohamadou Souley (Cameroon); Pierre Enyegue, Tocke Thierry |
Note: Wilson / Dani, Elisio, Kali, Kumaca / Amaro (substituted off) , Chileshe (substituted off) , Mingo Bile (substituted off) , Roger, Sangala / João Martins — Fofaná (substituted on) , Buá (substituted on) , Danny (substituted on)

| Sat, 19 Mar 2011 R32–1 | 1º de Agosto (Angola) | 2–0 | (Republic of the Congo) AC Léopards | Luanda |
| 20:00 WAT (UTC+1) | Chileshe (yellow card) 25'; Roger 37'; João Vala (yellow card) 67'; Bena 74' | Report | (yellow card) 42' Soukou; (yellow card) (yellow-red card) Nkodia | Stadium: Estádio dos Coqueiros; Attendance: 7.000; Referee: Mbongseni Fakudze (Swaziland); Sibiya Sikelela, Bhekisizwe Mkhabela |
Note: Wilson / Dani, Elisio, J.Vala (substituted off) 80', Kali / Chileshe, Manucho (substituted off) 57', Mingo Bile (substituted off) 72', Roger / Amaro, Bena — J.Martins (substituted on) 57', Buá (substituted on) 72', Nandinho (substituted on) 80'

== 2010 Confederation Cup ==
| Sat, 31 Jul 2010 R16(2)–2 | 1º de Agosto (Angola) | 2–1 | (Libya) Al-Ittihad | Luanda |
| 15:00 WAT (UTC+1) | Younes 48' (o.g.); Sangala 60' | Report | 8' Kamile | Stadium: Estádio da Cidadela; Attendance: 3,000; Referee: Mohamed Benouza (Algeria) |
Note: Tony / Dani, Elisio, J.Vala (substituted off) 85', M.Sanda / Chileshe, Manucho, Mingo Bile (substituted off) 83', Sangala / Danny (c), Bena — Bolingó (substituted on) 83', Mano (substituted on) 85'

| Fri, 16 Jul 2010 R16(2)–1 | Al Ittihad (Libya) | 2–0 | (Angola) 1º de Agosto | Tripoli |
| 17:00 EET (UTC+2) | | | | Stadium: June 11 Stadium |

| Sat, 08 May 2010 R16(1)–2 | 1º de Agosto (Angola) | 0–0 | (Mali) Coton Sport | Luanda |
| 15:30 WAT (UTC+1) | Manucho (yellow card) | Report | (yellow card) Balokog; (yellow card) Aboubakar; (yellow card) Keita | Stadium: Estádio da Cidadela; Attendance: 3,000; Referee: Tabani Mnkantjo (Zimbabwe) |
Note: Tony / Dani, Kumaca, Mingo Bile, M.Sanda / Chileshe, Manucho (substituted off) 65', Roger, Sangala / Bena (substituted off) 86', Danny (c) (substituted off) 81' — J.Vala (substituted on) 65', Fofaná (substituted on) 81', Love (substituted on) 86'

| Sat, 24 Apr 2010 R16(1)–1 | Coton Sport (Cameroon) | 1–2 | (Angola) 1º de Agosto | Garoua |
| 16:00 WAT (UTC+1) | Gomi | | 43' 62' Bena | Stadium: Stade Omnisport |

| Sat, 03 Apr 2010 1R–2 | 1º de Agosto (Angola) | 3–0 | (Mali) Olympique Bamako | Luanda |
| 15:30 WAT (UTC+1) | Mendonça 15'; Love 57'; Bena 60' | Report | | Stadium: Estádio da Cidadela; Referee: Simanga Nhleko (Swaziland) |
Note: Tony / Dani, João Vala, Mingo Bile, Mingo Sanda / Chileshe, Danny, Sangala, Mendonça (substituted off) / Bena (substituted off) , Love (substituted off) — Castigo (substituted on) , Mano (substituted on) , Fofaná (substituted on)

| Sat, 20 Mar 2010 1R–1 | Olympique Bamako (Mali) | 0–0 | (Angola) 1º de Agosto | Bamako |
| 15:30 GMT (UTC+0) | | | | Stadium: Prince Moulay Abdellah; Referee: Bakary Gassama (Gambia) |

== 2009 Confederation Cup ==
| Sun, 20 Sep 2009 GS R3 2L | H. El Hodoud (Egypt) | 5–1 | (Angola) 1º de Agosto | Alexandria |
| 18:00 EET (UTC+2) | Abdel-Ghani 9'; Halim 18'; Salama 23', 59'; Safi 86' | | 29' Pilola | Stadium: H.El Hodoud Stadium |

| Sat, 12 Sep 2009 GS R2 2L | 1º de Agosto (Angola) | 0–0 | (Mali) Stade Malien | Luanda |
| 15:00 WAT (UTC+1) | | Report | | Stadium: Estádio da Cidadela; Attendance: 3,000; Referee: Gil Sébastien Ndume (Gabon) |
Note: Tony / Elisio, Joãozinho, Mingo Bile (substituted off) 69', M.Sanda / Bena, Fofaná, Roger, Zé Augusto (substituted off) 76' / Danny, Love (substituted off) 46' — Mano (substituted on) 46', Tuabi (substituted on) 69', Dockies (substituted on) 76'

| Sat, 29 Aug 2009 GS R1 2L | 1º de Agosto (Angola) | 3–1 | (Nigeria) Bayelsa Untd | Luanda |
| 15:00 WAT (UTC+1) | Fofaná 4'; Roger; Mano | Report | 8' Otimoti | Stadium: Estádio da Cidadela; Referee: Khalid Abdel Rahman (Sudan) |
Note: Tony / Elisio, Joãozinho (substituted off) 86', Kumaca, Mingo Sanda (substituted off) 59' / Danny, Fofaná, Manucho (substituted off) 54', Roger / Love (c), Bena — Zé Augusto (substituted on) 54', Mano (substituted on) 59', Sangala (substituted on) 86'

| Sat, 15 Aug 2009 GS R3 1L | Bayelsa Untd (Nigeria) | 4–0 | (Angola) 1º de Agosto | Oghara |
| 15:00 WAT (UTC+1) | Ubale 7'; Okoro 28'; Okonkwo 62'; Kadiri 71' | | | Stadium: Oghara Stadium |

| Sat, 01 Aug 2009 GS R2 1L | 1º de Agosto (Angola) | 1–0 | (Egypt) H. El Hodoud | Luanda |
| 15:00 WAT (UTC+1) | Love 45' (pen.) | Report | | Stadium: Estádio da Cidadela; Attendance: 15,000; Referee: Joseph Lamptey (Ghana) |
Note: Pitchu / Elisio, Joãozinho, Kumaca, M.Sanda / Danny (substituted off) 86', Fofaná, Manucho, Zé Augusto (c) / Love, Tuabi (substituted off) 53' — Mano (substituted on) 53', Sangala (substituted on) 86'

| Sat, 18 Jul 2009 GS R1 1L | Stade Malien (Mali) | 0–0 | (Angola) 1º de Agosto | Bamako |
| 17:30 GMT (UTC+0) | | | | Stadium: Stade du 26 Mars |

| Sat, 30 May 2009 PO–2 | CS Sfaxien (Tunisia) | 2–0 (4–5 p) | (Angola) 1º de Agosto | Sfax |
| 17:30 CET (UTC+1) | Merdassi 43'; Abbès 82' | | | Stadium: Taïeb Mhiri; Referee: Noumandiez Doué (Ivory Coast) |
| | Penalties |
| | Chedi (penalty scored); Hemini (penalty scored); Benoni (penalty scored); Merdassi (penalty missed) | | (penalty scored) Kumaca; (penalty scored) Love; (penalty scored) Zé Augusto; (penalty scored) Danny; (penalty scored) Bena |

| Sat, 16 May 2009 PO–1 | 1º de Agosto (Angola) | 2–0 | (Tunisia) CS Sfaxien | Luanda |
| 15:00 WAT (UTC+1) | Love 14'; Bena 48' | Report | | Stadium: Estádio da Cidadela; Attendance: 7,000; Referee: Muhmed Ssegonga (Uganda) |
Note: Pitchu / Elisio, Kumaca, M.Sanda, Sangala (substituted off) 46' / Danny (substituted off) 82', Fofaná, Manucho, Roger / Bena (substituted off) 88', Love – Zé Augusto (substituted on) 46', Mano (substituted on) 82', Tuabi (substituted on) 88'

== 2009 Champions League ==
| Sun, 03 May 2009 R16–2 | Al-Hilal (Sudan) | 2–0 | (Angola) 1º de Agosto | Omdurman |
| 15:30 EAT (UTC+3) | El Tahir 45' (pen.); Lelo 74' | | | Stadium: Al-Hilal Stadium; Referee: Kenias Marange (Zimbabwe) |

| Sun, 19 Apr 2009 R16–1 | 1º de Agosto (Angola) | 3–1 | (Sudan) Al-Hilal | Luanda |
| 15:30 WAT (UTC+1) | Bena 7' 10'; Mano | Report | 5' Lelo | Stadium: Cidadela; Attendance: 4.000; Referee: Kacem Bennaceur (Tunisia) |
Note: Pitchu / Elisio, Joãozinho, Kumaca, M.Sanda / Fofaná, Manucho (substituted off) 77', Ramaphoko, Roger / Bena (substituted off) 54', Love — Danny (substituted on) 54', Alberto (substituted on) 77'

| Mon, 06 Apr 2009 R32–2 | Canon Yaoundé (Cameroon) | 0–1 (4–5 p) | (Angola) 1º de Agosto | Douala |
| 15:30 WAT (UTC+1) | Touko (yellow card) 83' | Report | 77' Tuabi | Stadium: La Réunification; Referee: Noumandiez Doué (Ivory Coast); Yao Songuifolo, Tehe Guei |
| | Penalties |
| | Touko (penalty missed); Libong (penalty missed) | | (penalty missed) Joãozinho |
Note: Pitchu / Elisio, Joãozinho, Kumaca, Mingo Sanda / Fofaná (substituted off) 58', Manucho, Ramaphoko (substituted off) 46', Roger / Bena (substituted off) 64', Love — Mano (substituted on) 46', Danny (substituted on) 58', Tuabi (substituted on) 64'

| Sat, 14 Mar 2009 R32–1 | 1º de Agosto (Angola) | 0–1 | (Cameroon) Canon Yaoundé | Luanda |
| 15:30 WAT (UTC+1) | | Report | (yellow card) 9' Mboma; (yellow card) 33' (goal) 62' Aboueme; (yellow card) 70' Libong | Stadium: Cidadela; Attendance: 20.000; Referee: Leya Mbila (DR Congo); Moise Miboti, Ntunku Mukangala |
Note: Pitchu / Elisio, Mingo Bile, Joãozinho, Kumaca / Alberto (substituted off) 55', Mano (substituted off) 46', Roger (substituted off) 25', Zé Augusto / Bena, Love — Tuabi (substituted on) 25', Ramaphoko (substituted on) 46', Manucho (substituted on) 55'

| Sat, 15 Feb 2009 PL–2 | CARA (Republic of the Congo) | 1–2 | (Angola) 1º de Agosto | Brazzaville |
| 15:30 WAT (UTC+1) | Osséré 62' | | 86' Alberto; 90' (o.g.) Miangounina | Stadium: Massemba-Débat; Referee: Jean-Marie Kakonde (DR Congo) |

| Sat, 31 Jan 2009 PL–1 | 1º de Agosto (Angola) | 5–2 | (Republic of the Congo) CARA | Luanda |
| 15:30 WAT (UTC+1) | Ramaphoko 8'; Fofaná 31', 66'; Bena 36'; Love 61' | Report | (yellow card) 6' Lema; 12' Elinga; 79' (o.g.) Kumaca | Stadium: Cidadela; Referee: Wellington Kaoma (Zambia) |
Note: Pitchu / Elisio, Mingo Bile, Joãozinho, Kumaca / Danny (substituted off) Roger (substituted on) , Ramaphoko (substituted off) Mano (substituted on) , Fofaná, Zé Augusto / Bena (substituted off) Tuabi (substituted on) 68', Love

== 2008 Champions League ==
| Fri, 04 Apr 2008 R32–2 | 1º de Agosto (Angola) | 2–1 | (Libya) Al Ittihad | Luanda |
| 15:00 WAT (UTC+1) | H.Milanzi 26', 55' | | 78' Zubya | Stadium: Cidadela; Referee: Devine Evehe (Cameroon) |
Note: Tony / Elisio (substituted off) 82', Joãozinho, Locó, Kumaca / Fofaná, Miro (substituted off) 46', Roger, Zé Augusto (substituted off) 64' / Bena, Harry Milanzi — Levis (substituted on) 46', Mbiyavanga (substituted on) 64', Phiri (substituted on) 82'

| Sun, 23 Mar 2008 R32–1 | Al Ittihad (Libya) | 1–0 | (Angola) 1º de Agosto | Tripoli |
| 17:00 EET (UTC+2) | Alsanane 72' | | | Stadium: June 11 Stadium; Referee: Ali Kalyango (Uganda) |

| Fri, 29 Feb 2008 PL–2 | 1º de Agosto (Angola) | 0–0 | (Mali) Stade Malien | Luanda |
| 15:00 WAT (UTC+1) | | Report | | Stadium: Coqueiros; Attendance: 5.000; Referee: Mbongseni Fakudze (Swaziland) |
Note: Pitchu / Elisio, Joãozinho, Locó, Kumaca / Mbiyavanga (substituted off) , Mendes, Tião (substituted off) , Zé Augusto / Bena, Fofaná (substituted off) — Roger (substituted on) , Danny (substituted on) , Milanzi (substituted on)

| Sun, 17 Feb 2008 PL–1 | Stade Malien (Mali) | 1–2 | (Angola) 1º de Agosto | Bamako |
| 15:00 GMT (UTC+0) | Iliassou 36' (pen.) | | 49' Zé Augusto; 75' Bena | Stadium: Modibo Kéïta; Referee: Adigun Ojo-Oba (Nigeria) |

== 2007 Champions League ==
| Sun, 11 Feb 2007 PR–2L | Mangasport (Gabon) | 1–1 | (Angola) 1º de Agosto | Moanda |
| 15:00 WAT (UTC+1) | Goal | | Milanzi | Stadium: Stade Henri Sylvoz |
Note: Pitchu / Elisio, Joãozinho, Locó, Miro / Gazeta (substituted off) , Ian Bakala, Roger (substituted off) , Zé Augusto / André, Tião (substituted off) — Kumaca (substituted on) , Danny (substituted on) , Milanzi (substituted on)

| Sun, 28 Jan 2007 PR–1L | 1º de Agosto (Angola) | 0–1 | (Gabon) Mangasport | Luanda |
| 15:00 WAT (UTC+1) | | Report | 18' Loló | Stadium: Estádio dos Coqueiros; Attendance: 10,000; Referee: Ndey Tembua (Congo) |
Note: Pitchu / Elisio, Joãozinho, Locó, Miro / Gazeta (substituted off) , Ian Bakala, Roger (substituted off) , Zé Augusto / André, Tião (substituted off) — Kumaca (substituted on) , Milanzi (substituted on) , Danny (substituted on)

== 2003 CAF Cup ==
| Sat, 26 Apr 2003 R1–2 | Sundowns (South Africa) | 2–0 (9–8 p) | (Angola) 1º de Agosto | Pretoria |
| 15:00 SAST (UTC+2) | Dos Santos 5'; Marumo 70' | | | Stadium: Loftus Versfeld |

| Sat, 12 Apr 2003 R1–1 | 1º de Agosto (Angola) | 2–0 | (South Africa) Sundowns | Luanda |
| 15:00 WAT (UTC+1) | Filipe 81' (pen.); Lucas 90' | Report | | Stadium: Estádio da Cidadela; Attendance: 3,000; Referee: Tshiamala Kalala (DR Congo) |
Note: Goliath / Dedas, Delgado, Calala, Joãozinho / Filipe, Jonas (substituted off) 46', Maninho Loide (substituted off) 33', Stopirrá / Sting, Yano (substituted off) 61' — Elisio (substituted on) 33', Dé (substituted on) 46', Lucas (substituted on) 61'

== 2000 Champions League ==
| Sun, 28 May 2000 R2–2L | 1º de Agosto (Angola) | 0–1 | (Nigeria) Lobi Stars | Luanda |
| 15:00 WAT (UTC+1) | | | 45' (pen.) Dooyum | Stadium: Estádio da Cidadela |
Note: Goliath / Dedas, Julião, Neto (substituted off) , Pedro / Filipe (substituted off) , Nelo (substituted off) , Stopirrá / Dé, Mara, Isaac — Ndola (substituted on) , Jorginho (substituted on) , Zalambila (substituted on)

| Sun, 07 May 2000 R2–1L | Lobi Stars (Nigeria) | 1–1 | (Angola) 1º de Agosto | Makurdi |
| 15:00 WAT (UTC+1) | Apuruga 58' | | Isaac | Stadium: Aper Aku |
Note: Goliath / H.Vicente, Julião, Neto, Pedro / Filipe, Langa, Nelo, Stopirrá / Mara, Muembe (substituted off) — Alfa (substituted on)

| Sun, 02 Apr 2000 R1–2L | 1º de Agosto (Angola) | 4–0 | (Republic of the Congo) Vita Club | Luanda |
| 15:00 WAT (UTC+1) | Moisés 38', 90+2'; Isaac 45' (pen.), 83' | | | Stadium: Estádio da Cidadela |
Note: Ekobolo / H.Vicente, Julião, Ndola, Neto (substituted off) / Filipe, Mara, Nelo (substituted off) Stopirrá / Isaac, Moisés — Muembe (substituted on) , Abel (substituted on)

| Mon, 20 Mar 2000 R1–1L | Vita Club (Republic of the Congo) | 2–1 | (Angola) 1º de Agosto | Pointe Noire |
| 15:00 WAT (UTC+1) | Muzi 43'; Kwa 84' | | 89' Filipe | Stadium: Stade Municipal |
Note: Ekobolo / H.Vicente, Julião, Ndola, Neto (substituted off) / Dé, Filipe, Nelo (substituted off) , Stopirrá / Isaac, Mara (substituted off) — Muembe (substituted on) , Langa (substituted on) , Moisés (substituted on)

| Sun, 13 Feb 2000 PR 2L | Akonangui (Equatorial Guinea) | 0–1 | (Angola) 1º de Agosto | Bata |
| 15:00 WAT (UTC+1) | | | Isaac | Stadium: Estadio La Libertad |
Note: Ekobolo / Abel, Dedas, Julião, Pedro / Dé, Filipe, Mara, Muembe / Isaac, Zalambila

| Sun, 30 Jan 2000 PR 1L | 1º de Agosto (Angola) | 4–0 | (Equatorial Guinea) Akonangui | Luanda |
| 15:00 WAT (UTC+1) | Isaac 8', 50', 90+3'; Dé 47' | | | Stadium: Estádio da Cidadela |
Note: Ekobolo / Abel, Dedas, Julião, Pedro / Dé, Filipe, Mara (substituted off) , Muembe / Isaac, Zalambila (substituted off) — Langa (substituted on) , Moisés I (substituted on)

== 1999 Champions League ==
| Sun, 28 Mar 1999 R1–2L | 1º de Agosto (Angola) | 1–1 | (Burundi) Vital'O | Luanda |
| 15:00 WAT (UTC+1) | Dé 76' | | 59' Omar | Stadium: Estádio da Cidadela |
Note: Goliath / Gonçalves, Julião, Moisés, Pedro / Assis (substituted off) 58', Dé (substituted on) 58', Filipe, Mendonça, Stopirrá / Isaac, Muanza (substituted off) Nelo (substituted on)

| Sun, 14 Mar 1999 R1–1L | Vital'O (Burundi) | 2–1 | (Angola) 1º de Agosto | Bujumbura |
| 15:00 CAT (UTC+2) | Omar 55'; Haruna 60' | | Isaac | Stadium: Prince Louis Rwagasore |
Note: Goliath / Gonçalves, Julião, Moisés, Pedro / Assis, Filipe, Mendonça, Muanza (substituted off) Nelo (substituted on) / Dé (substituted off) Stopirrá (substituted on) , Zalambila (substituted off) Isaac (substituted on)

== 1998 Cup Winners' Cup ==
D'Agosto's coach Ndunguidi deployed three quarter-backs and that strategy paid off when Nsilulu made a superior play for Muanza to score 1-0. Espérance needed to play on the offense and three quarter-backs made D'Agosto's defense look like an insurmountable wall. Stopirrá, Pedro and Nsilulu were at the top of their game to the despair of their opponents. However, the home team managed to score at only 4 minutes of play. Espérance was putting a lot of pressure and close to half time, the referee wrongly awarded a penalty on Julião. Hamrouni took the penalty and scored 2-1. In the second half, D'Agosto was defending too close to the penalty box, Espérance took advantage and Laroussi scored 3-1 after a poor save by D'Agosto's goal-keeper Goliath.

During the second half of the match played in Tunis, with D'Agosto leading 1–0, Assis missed a penalty kick. D'Agosto ultimately lost the match 3–1. Assis served as the team's designated penalty kicker under coach Ndunguidi Daniel, having previously scored two penalties in a match against USM Alger. At Cidadela, following their previous tactical display against Africa Sport, D'Agosto's gameplay shifted toward long passes into the penalty box rather than utilizing the flanks through the speed of Mendonça or Nsilulu.

=== Final ===
==== First leg ====
Sat, 21 November 1998
15:00

| Espérance de Tunis (Tunisia) | 3–1 | (Angola) Primeiro de Agosto |
|---|---|---|
| Jaïdi 6'; Hamrouni 45' (pen.); Lâaroussi 55' | Report | 2' Muanza |

El Menzah, Tunis
Referee: Coffi Codjia (Benin)

| Espérance | D'Agosto |

| GK | 1 | (Tunisia) El Ouaer |
| RB | 6 | (Tunisia) Sahbani |
| CB | 15 | (Tunisia) Jaïdi |
| CB | 26 | (Tunisia) Badra |
| LB | | (Tunisia) Nouira |
| RM | | (Tunisia) Gabsi | (substituted off) 80' |
| DM | | (Tunisia) Chihi |
| CM | | (Tunisia) Kanzari | (substituted off) 80' |
| LM | | (Tunisia) Hamrouni |
| FW | | (Tunisia) Tlemçani |
| FW | | (Tunisia) Lâaroussi |
Substitutions:
| MF | | (Tunisia) Melliti | (substituted on) 80' |
| DF | 5 | (Tunisia) Ben Ahmed |
| – |
Manager:
(Tunisia) Youssef Zouaoui

| GK | 1 | (Angola) | Goliath |
| RB | 4 | (Angola) | Hélder Vicente |
| CB | 5 | (Angola) | Neto (c) |
| CB | 13 | (Angola) | Julião |
| LB | 21 | (Angola) | Pedro |
| RM | 14 | (Angola) | Mendonça | (substituted off) 61' |
| DM | 22 | (Angola) | Filipe |
| CM | 3 | (Angola) | Stopirrá |
| LM | | (Angola) | Moisés II |
| FW | 11 | (Angola) | Muanza |
| FW | 18 | (Democratic Republic of the Congo) | Nsilulu | (substituted off) 78' |
Substitutions:
| FW | | (Democratic Republic of the Congo) | Nzalambila | (substituted on) 61' |
| DF | | (Angola) | Castela | (substituted on) 78' |
| – |
Manager:
(Angola) Daniel Ndunguidi

Assistant referees:
Anedee Honndenton
Alain Adjozi

Fourth official:

Commissioner:

==== Second leg ====
Sun, 6 December 1998
15:00

| Primeiro de Agosto (Angola) | 1–1 | (Tunisia) Espérance de Tunis |
|---|---|---|
| Nsilulu 41' | Report | 90' Melliti |

Estádio da Cidadela, Luanda
Referee: Yigzaw Bezuayehu (Ethiopia)

| D'Agosto | Espérance |

| GK | 1 | (Angola) | Goliath |
| RB | 4 | (Angola) | Hélder Vicente |
| CB | 5 | (Angola) | Neto (c) |
| CB | | (Angola) | Gonçalves | (substituted off) 83' |
| LB | 21 | (Angola) | Pedro |
| RM | 14 | (Angola) | Mendonça | (substituted off) 68' |
| DM | 22 | (Angola) | Filipe |
| CM | 3 | (Angola) | Stopirrá |
| LM | 8 | (Angola) | Assis |
| FW | 17 | (Angola) | Agó |
| FW | 18 | (Democratic Republic of the Congo) | Nsilulu |
Substitutions:
| FW | 29 | (Angola) | Pena | (substituted on) 68' |
| DF | | (Angola) | Castela | (substituted on) 83' |
| – |
Manager:
(Angola) Daniel Ndunguidi

GK | 1 | (Tunisia) El Ouaer
RB | 6 | (Tunisia) Sahbani
CB | 15 | (Tunisia) Jaïdi
CB | 26 | (Tunisia) Badra
LB | 17 | (Tunisia) Azaiez
RM | (Tunisia) Gabsi | (red card) 48'
DM | (Tunisia) Chihi
CM | (Tunisia) Melliti | (substituted off) 90'
LM | (Tunisia) Chebbi
FW | (Tunisia) Hamrouni | (substituted off) 85'
FW | (Tunisia) Tlemçani
Substitutions:
MF | (Tunisia) Kanzari | (substituted on) 85'
DF | (Tunisia) Nouira | (substituted on) 90'
–
Manager:
(Tunisia) Youssef Zouaoui

Assistant referees:
Getachew Gebremarian
Kine Tibetu

Fourth official:

Commissioner:

| Sat, 24 Oct 1998 SF 2L | 1º de Agosto (Angola) | 4–0 | (Ivory Coast) Africa Sports | Luanda |
| 15:00 WAT (UTC+1) | Mendonça 25', 50'; Muanza 36' (pen.); Nsilulu 77' | | | Stadium: Estádio da Cidadela |
Note: Goliath / H.Vicente, Moisés II (substituted off) 61', Neto, Pedro / Filipe, Muanza (c), Nsilulu (substituted off) 79', Stopirrá / Mendonça, Moisés I (substituted off) 70' — Kiss (substituted on) 61', Agó (substituted on) 70', L.Carlos (substituted on) 79'

| Sun, 11 Oct 1998 SF 1L | Africa Sports (Ivory Coast) | 3–1 | (Angola) 1º de Agosto | Abidjan |
| 15:00 GMT (UTC+0) | Gneto 35'; Komara 48'; Babou 50' | | 75' Nsilulu | Stadium: Houphouët-Boigny; Referee: Souleymanou Konate (Cameroon) |
Note: Goliath / H.Vicente, Julião, Neto (c), Pedro / Filipe, Mendonça (substituted off) , Muanza (substituted off) , Nsilulu / Pena, Isaac (substituted off) — Assis (substituted on) , Stopirrá (substituted on) , Zalambila (substituted on)

| Fri, 18 Sep 1998 QF 2L | USM Alger (Algeria) | 1–2 | (Angola) 1º de Agosto | Blida |
| 15:00 CET (UTC+1) | Khomi 84' | | 63', 76' Agó | Stadium: Mustapha-Tchaker |
Note: Goliath / Julião, Moisés II, Neto (c), Pedro / Assis (substituted off) , Filipe, Muanza, Nsilulu / Agó, Pena — Castela (substituted on) , Moisés I (substituted on) , Mendonça (substituted on)

| Sun, 6 Sep 1998 QF 1L | 1º de Agosto (Angola) | 3–0 | (Algeria) USM Alger | Luanda |
| 15:00 WAT (UTC+1) | Assis 35' (pen.), 72' (pen.); Moisés 88' | | | Stadium: Estádio da Cidadela; Referee: Cinji Badibake (DR Congo); Engo Yondu, Célestin Longalonga |
Note: Goliath / H.Vicente (substituted off) , Julião, Moisés II, Pedro / Assis, Filipe, Muanza (substituted off) , Stopirrá / Agó, Pena (substituted off) — Neto (substituted on) , Moisés I (substituted on) , Nsilulu (substituted on)

| Sat, 9 May 1998 R2 2L | 1º de Agosto (Angola) | 6–0 | (Mauritius) Fire Brigade | Luanda |
| 15:00 WAT (UTC+1) | Julião 47'; Moisés I 52', 67', 90+2' (pen.); L.Carlos 76'; Assis 89' | | | Stadium: Estádio da Cidadela; Referee: Joseph Mandzioukouta (Congo); Alexandre Bouity, Albert Makoumbou |
Note: Goliath / H.Vicente, Julião, Kiss, Neto (substituted off) / Assis, Moisés II, Nsilulu, Stopirrá (substituted off) / Moisés I, Muanza — L.Carlos (substituted on) , Mfede (substituted on)

| Sun, 26 Apr 1998 R2 2L | Fire Brigade (Mauritius) | 2–3 | (Angola) 1º de Agosto | Port Louis |
| 15:00 MUT (UTC+4) | Bayrame 30'; Apadou | | 40' Assis; 55' Moisés I Stopirrá | Referee: Wetweys Matchubella (South Africa) |

| Sun, 05 Apr 1998 R1 2L | Notwane (Botswana) | 3–1 | (Angola) 1º de Agosto | Gaborone |
| 15:00 CAT (UTC+2) | Tiklaya 28' (pen.); Rankai 46', 80' | | Assis | Stadium: National Stadium |
Note: Goliath / Julião, Moisés II, Mfede, Neto / Assis (substituted off) L.Carlos (substituted on) , Nsilulu, Stopirrá, Xavier / Moisés I (substituted off) Pena (substituted on) , Muanza

| Sun, 22 Mar 1998 R1 1L | 1º de Agosto (Angola) | 4–0 | (Botswana) Notwane | Luanda |
| 15:00 WAT (UTC+1) | Moisés II 17'; Moisés I 38', 40', 87' | | | Stadium: Estádio da Cidadela; Referee: Simon Areseb (Namibia); Isboseth Kandjii, Silva Maria |
Note: Goliath / Julião, Kialunguila, Moisés II, Neto / Muanza (c) (substituted off) L.Carlos (substituted on) , Nsilulu, Stopirrá, Xavier / Moisés I, Pena (substituted off) Assis (substituted on)

== 1997 Champions League ==
| Sat, 08 Nov 1997 GA R3 2L | USM Alger (Algeria) | 1–0 | (Angola) 1º de Agosto | Algiers |
| 15:00 CET (UTC+1) | Dziri 28' | | | Stadium: Omar Hamadi |
Note: Ntomas / Gonçalves (substituted off) Dé (substituted on) , H.Vicente, Julião, Neto / Assis, Makita (substituted off) Moisés I (substituted on) , Nsilulu, Stopirrá / Muanza (substituted off) Moisés II (substituted on)

| Fri, 24 Oct 1997 GA R2 2L | Raja Casablanca (Morocco) | 4–0 | (Angola) 1º de Agosto | Casablanca |
| 15:00 WET (UTC+0) | Ereyahi 20'; Nazir 28'; Jrindou 45'; Ogandaga | | | Stadium: Mohamed V |
Note: Ntomas / H.Vicente, Moisés II, Julião, Neto / Assis, Fuidimau, Kiss, Stopirrá / Muanza, Nsilulu — Dé (substituted on) , Makita (substituted on) , Moisés I (substituted on)

| Fri, 10 Oct 1997 GA R1 2L | 1º de Agosto (Angola) | 2–1 | (South Africa) Orlando Pirates | Luanda |
| 15:00 WAT (UTC+1) | Bernard 22' (o.g.); Makita | | 30' (pen.) | Stadium: Cidadela |
Note: Ntomas / H.Vicente, Gonçalves, Julião, Neto / Assis (substituted off) Makita (substituted on) , Kiss, Nsilulu (substituted off) Moisés II (substituted on) , Stopirrá / Dé (substituted off) Castela (substituted on) , Muanza

| Sat, 20 Sep 1997 GA R3 1L | 1º de Agosto (Angola) | 2–1 | (Algeria) USM Alger | Luanda |
| 15:00 WAT (UTC+1) | Julião; Kiss (pen.) | | Zekri | Stadium: Cidadela |
Note: Ntomas / H.Vicente, Julião, Moisés II, Neto / Assis, Fuidimau (substituted off) Nsilulu (substituted on) , Kiss, Moisés I (substituted off) Castela (substituted on) / Isaac, Muanza

| Sun, 07 Sep 1997 GA R2 1L | 1º de Agosto (Angola) | 1–1 | (Morocco) Raja Casablanca | Luanda |
| 15:00 WAT (UTC+1) | Julião 90' | | 55' Moustaoudia | Stadium: Cidadela |
Note: Ntomas / Julião, Mfede (substituted off) Serginho (substituted on) , Moisés II, Neto / Assis, Fuidimau, Kiss, Nsilulu / Isaac (substituted off) Makita (substituted on) , Muanza (substituted off) Dé (substituted on)

| Fri, 22 Aug 1997 GA R1 1L | Orlando Pirates (South Africa) | 1–2 | (Angola) 1º de Agosto | Johannesburg |
| 15:00 SAST (UTC+2) | | | Nsilulu; Muanza | Stadium: Ellis Park |
Note: Ntomas / Julião, Mfede, Moisés II, Neto / Assis, Fuidimau, Kiss, Nsilulu / Isaac, Muanza

| Sun, 18 May 1997 R2 2L | 1º de Agosto (Angola) | 5–0 | (Ivory Coast) Africa Sports | Luanda |
| 15:00 WAT (UTC+1) | Castela 20'; Sako (o.g.); Muanza 42', 45', 65' | | | Stadium: Cidadela |
Note: Ntomas / Gonçalves, H.Vicente, Julião, Neto / Assis, Castela (substituted off) Fuidimau (substituted on) , Pedro (substituted off) Roque (substituted on) , Serginho / Muanza (substituted off) Dé (substituted on) , Stopirrá

| Sun, 04 May 1997 R2 1L | Africa Sports (Ivory Coast) | 1–1 | (Angola) 1º de Agosto | Bouaké |
| 15:00 GMT (UTC+0) | Patrick 12' | | 44' Assis | Stadium: Stade Bouaké |
Note: Ntomas / Gonçalves, H.Vicente, Julião, Neto / Assis, Castela, Fuidimau, Pedro / Muanza, Stopirrá

| Sat, 22 Mar 1997 R1 2L | Notwane (Botswana) | 1–2 | (Angola) 1º de Agosto | Gaborone |
| 15:00 CAT (UTC+2) | Bennet 63' | | 13' Castela; 90' Dé | Stadium: National Stadium |
Note: Ntomas / Gonçalves, Julião, Pedro, Roque / Assis, Castela, Fuidimau, Stopirrá / Moisés, Muanza — Dé (substituted on) , J.Andrade (substituted on) , Neto (substituted on)

| Sun, 09 Mar 1997 R1 1L | 1º de Agosto (Angola) | 1–1 | (Botswana) Notwane | Luanda |
| 15:00 WAT (UTC+1) | Muanza 64' (pen.) | | 16' Masego | Stadium: Cidadela |
Note: Ntomas / Gonçalves, H.Vicente, Julião, Roque (substituted off) Pedro (substituted on) / Castela, Fuidimau, Stopirrá / Dé (substituted off) Moisés II (substituted on) , J.Andrade (substituted off) Bolefo (substituted on) , Muanza

== 1996 CAF Cup ==
| Sun, 19 May 1996 R2 2L | 1º de Agosto (Angola) | 1–0 | (Zaire) AS Vita Club | Luanda |
| 15:00 WAT (UTC+1) | Pena 66' | | | Stadium: Estádio da Cidadela |
Note: Ntomas / Gonçalves, H.Vicente, Quim Faria, Pedro (substituted off) Moisés (substituted on) / Fuidimau, Milonga (substituted off) Pena, (substituted on) Nhanga (substituted off) Bifex (substituted on) , Roque / Muanza, Ndisso

| Wed, 08 May 1996 R2 1L | AS Vita Club (Zaire) | 3–0 | (Angola) 1º de Agosto | Kinshasa |
| 15:00 WAT (UTC+1) | Lisasi 7'; Luende 68' (pen.); 80' | | (red card) 9' Assis; (red card) 69' Nelo | Referee: António Suez (Equatorial Guinea) |
Note: Ntomas / Gonçalves, H.Vicente, Nelo, Pedro / Assis, Fuidimau, Milonga, Roque / Muanza, Ndisso

| Sun, 24 Mar 1996 R1 2L | 1º de Agosto (Angola) | 4–1 | (Namibia) Blue Waters | Luanda |
| 15:00 WAT (UTC+1) | Ndisso 24', 45'; Fuidimau 55'; Moisés I 65' | | 27' Koss | Stadium: Estádio dos Coqueiros |
Note: Ntomas / Gonçalves, Nelo, Neto, Roque / Assis, Fuidimau, Muanza, Xavier / Moisés I, Ndisso (substituted off) Nhanga (substituted on)

| Sat, 09 Mar 1996 R1 1L | Blue Waters (Namibia) | 1–2 | (Angola) 1º de Agosto | Walvis Bay |
| 15:00 WAST (UTC+2) | | | Fuidimau 7', 85' | Stadium: Kuisebmund Stadium |
Note: Ntomas / Gonçalves, Nelo, Neto, Roque / Assis, Fuidimau, Muanza, Xavier / Moisés I, Ndisso

== 1993 Cup of Champions Clubs ==
| Sun, 04 Apr 1993 R1 2L | RC Bafoussam (Cameroon) | 2–0 | (Angola) 1º de Agosto | Yaoundé |
| 15:00 WAT (UTC+1) | Kombou 3', 47' | | | Stadium: Ahmadou Ahidjo |
Note: Ntomas / Kiss, Neto, Roberto, Russo / Corola, Fuidimau, Muanza / Mbila, Ndisso (substituted off) Moisés (substituted on) , Zacarias

| Sun, 21 Mar 1993 R1 1L | 1º de Agosto (Angola) | 2–2 | (Cameroon) RC Bafoussam | Luanda |
| 16:00 WAT (UTC+1) | Muanza 28'; Roberto 90+3' | | 6' Kallon; 47' Ndi | Stadium: Cidadela |
Note: Zé Gordo / Kiss, Neto, Roberto, Russo (substituted off) Nelo (substituted on) / Corola, Fuidimau, Muanza / Mbila (substituted off) Moisés (substituted on) Ndisso, Zacarias

| PR 2L | Buff. du Borgou (Benin) | Walkover | (Angola) 1º de Agosto | Parakou |
| 15:00 WAT (UTC+1) | | | | Stadium: Municipal de Parakou |

| PR 1L | 1º de Agosto (Angola) | Walkover | (Benin) Buff. du Borgou | Luanda |
| 15:00 WAT (UTC+1) | | | | Stadium: Cidadela |

== 1992 Cup of Champions Clubs ==
| Sat, 30 May 1992 R2 2L | Club Africain (Tunisia) | 3–0 | (Angola) 1º de Agosto | Tunis |
| 15:00 CET (UTC+1) | (pen.); 5' (pen.) | | | Stadium: El Menzah |
Note: Zé Gordo / Ivo, Neto, Rabolé, Russo / Bolefo, Fuidimau, Loth / Mbila, Muanza, Zacarias

| Sun, 17 May 1992 R2 1L | 1º de Agosto (Angola) | 2–0 | (Tunisia) Club Africain | Luanda |
| 15:00 WAT (UTC+1) | Loth 12' (pen.); Zacarias 78' | | | Stadium: Cidadela; Referee: Wa Ntambidila (Zaire) |
Note: Zé Gordo / Ivo, Neto, Rabolé, Russo / Bolefo (substituted off) Zacarias (substituted on) Fuidimau, Loth / Mbila (substituted off) V.Dias (substituted on) Muanza, Ndisso

| Sun, 05 Apr 1992 R1 2L | AS Sogara (Gabon) | 0–2 | (Angola) 1º de Agosto | Port-Gentil |
| 16:00 WAT (UTC+1) | | | 75', 83' Ndisso | Stadium: Stade de la Mosquée |
Note: Zé Gordo / Ivo, Kiss, Neto, Velho / Fuidimau, Rabolé, Valentim / Mbila (substituted off) 70', Muanza (substituted off) 90+2' Ndisso (c) — Bolefo (substituted on) 70', Nelo (substituted on) 90+2'

| Sun, 22 Mar 1992 R1 1L | 1º de Agosto (Angola) | 1–0 | (Gabon) AS Sogara | Luanda |
| 15:00 WAT (UTC+1) | Muanza 15' (pen.) | | | Stadium: Cidadela |
Note: Zé Gordo / Ivo, Kiss, Neto, Russo / Fuidimau, Rabolé, Valentim (substituted off) Barbosa (substituted on) / Mbila (substituted off) Bolefo (substituted on) , Muanza, Ndisso

| PR 2L | 1º de Agosto (Angola) | Walkover | (Equatorial Guinea) Elá Nguema | Luanda |
| 15:00 WAT (UTC+1) | | | | Stadium: Cidadela |

| Sun, 9 Feb 1992 PR 1L | Elá Nguema (Equatorial Guinea) | 2–3 | (Angola) 1º de Agosto | Malabo |
| 15:00 WAT (UTC+1) | 6'; Lourenço | | Russo; Bolefo; 82' Mbila | Stadium: Estadio de Malabo |
Note: Zé Gordo / Ivo, Kiss, Neto, Russo / Bolefo, Fuidimau, Rabolé / Loth, Mbila, Ndisso

== 1991 Cup Winners' Cup ==
| Sun, 24 Mar 1991 R1 2L | Diables Noirs (Republic of the Congo) | 2–1 | (Angola) 1º de Agosto | Brazzaville |
| 15:00 WAT (UTC+1) | | | Fuidimau | Stadium: Stade A. Massemba-Débat |
Note: Ntomas / Bolefo, Nelo, Neto, Russo / Barbosa, Fuidimau, Loth, Lucau / Ndisso, Vieira Dias

| Sun, 10 Mar 1991 R1 1L | 1º de Agosto (Angola) | 0–0 | (Republic of the Congo) Diables Noirs | Luanda |
| 15:00 WAT (UTC+1) | | | | Stadium: Estádio da Cidadela |
Note: Ntomas / Bolefo, Nelo, Neto, Russo / Barbosa, Fuidimau, Loth, Lucau / Ndisso, Vieira Dias

| Sun, 17 Feb 1991 PR 2L | Black Africa (Namibia) | 1–2 | (Angola) 1º de Agosto | Windhoek |
| 15:00 CAT (UTC+2) | Hentzen 57' | | Loth; Barbosa | Stadium: Sam Nujoma |
Note: Ntomas / Bolefo, Nelo, Neto, Russo / Barbosa, Fuidimau, Ivo, Lucau / Loth, Vieira Dias

| Sun, 03 Feb 1991 PR 1L | 1º de Agosto (Angola) | 7–0 | (Namibia) Black Africa | Luanda |
| 15:00 WAT (UTC+1) | V.Dias 13'; Russo 22'; Fuidimau 30', 77'; Lucau 42'; Barbosa; Bolefo 90+1' | | | Stadium: Estádio da Cidadela |
Note: Ntomas / Bolefo, Nelo, Neto, Russo / Fuidimau, Ivo, Loth (substituted off) Rabolé (substituted on) Lucau / Barbosa, Vieira Dias (substituted off) Ndisso (substituted on)

== 1985 Cup Winners' Cup ==
| Sun, 16 Mar 1985 R1 2L | Dihep di Nkam (Cameroon) | 3–0 | (Angola) 1º de Agosto | Douala |
| 15:00 WAT (UTC+1) | Bep Solo 8', 28'; Ekoulé 60' | | | Stadium: Stade de la Réunification; Referee: Amengar, Agbou, Amoako (Ghana) |
Note: Napoleão / Lourenço, Nelo, Ngusso, Tandu / Barbosa, Eduardo Machado (substituted off) *', Ndunguidi, Novato / Alves (substituted off) **', Nsuka — Manuel (substituted on) *', Nelito Kwanza (substituted on) **'

| Sun, 03 Mar 1985 R1 1L | 1º de Agosto (Angola) | 1–0 | (Cameroon) Dihep di Nkam | Luanda |
| 15:00 WAT (UTC+1) | Tandu 1' | | | Stadium: Estádio dos Coqueiros; Referee: Josepf Makosso; Simon Bantsimba, Denis Obambet (Congo) |
Note: Napoleão / Lourenço (c), Ngusso, Novato, Tandu / Amândio, Belchior (substituted off) 46', Nelo / Alves (substituted off) 45', Ndunguidi, Nelito Kwanza — Ed.Machado (substituted on) 45', Nsuka (substituted on) 46'

== 1982 Cup of Champions Clubs ==
| Sat, 24 Apr 1982 R1 2L | Enugu Rangers (Nigeria) | 3–0 | (Angola) 1º de Agosto | Enugu |
| 17:30 WAT (UTC+1) | 5'; 12'; 17' | | | Stadium: Nnamdi Azikiwe |
Note: Napoleão / Lourenço, Mesquita, Ndongala, Zomy / Amândio, Ivo, Tandu / Alves, Ndunguidi, Zeca

| Sun, 11 Apr 1982 R1 1L | 1º de Agosto (Angola) | 1–1 | (Nigeria) Enugu Rangers | Luanda |
| 15:00 WAT (UTC+1) | Lourenço 71' (pen.) | | 6' Onyedika | Stadium: Cidadela; Referee: Jean-Louis Kokolo (Congo); Engona Gaston, Obambet |
Note: Napoleão / Mesquita, Lourenço, Tandu, Zomy / Amândio, Nelo, Zeca / Alves (c), Ndunguidi, Zeca (substituted off) 45' — Nsuka (substituted on) 45'

== 1981 Cup of Champions Clubs ==
| Sun, 29 Mar 1981 R1 2L | Vita Club (Zaire) | 2–1 | (Angola) 1º de Agosto | Kinshasa |
| 15:00 WAT (UTC+1) | Baku 51' (pen.); Nkama 72' | | 69' Nsuka | Stadium: Stade du 20 Mai; Referee: Ayele Tessema (Ethiopia) |
Note: Napoleão / Agostinho, Lourenço, Manico, Ndongala / Amândio, Barros, Mesquita, Tandu / Alves, Ndunguidi (substituted off) Nsuka (substituted on)

| Sun, 15 Mar 1981 R1 1L | 1º de Agosto (Angola) | 1–1 | (Zaire) Vita Club | Luanda |
| 15:00 WAT (UTC+1) | Lourenço 90' (pen.) | | 20' Botukata | Stadium: Coqueiros; Referee: Kogalama Barthelemy (Central African Republic); Owakwo Faustin, Mokuwo Leon |
Note: Napoleão / Agostinho, Lourenço, Manico, Ndongala / Amândio, Barros, Mendinho (substituted off) 35' / Alves, Ndunguidi, Nsuka – Tandu (substituted on) 35'

== 1980 Cup of Champions Clubs ==
| Sun, 27 Apr 1980 R1 2L | 1º de Agosto (Angola) | 3–4 | (Cameroon) Canon Yaoundé | Luanda |
| 15:00 WAT (UTC+1) | Ndunguidi 11'; V.Dias 20'; Alves 45' | | 14', 18' M-Onguéné; 35' Emaná; 80' Abega | Stadium: Cidadela |
Note: Ângelo / Lourenço (c), Mascarenhas, Mateus, Ndongala / Amândio, Mendinho, Ndunguidi, Zeca / Alves (substituted off) , Viera Dias (substituted off) — Julião (substituted on) , Túbia (substituted on)

| Sun, 13 Apr 1980 R1 1L | Canon Yaoundé (Cameroon) | 3–0 | (Angola) 1º de Agosto | Yaoundé |
| 15:00 WAT (UTC+1) | Arantes 21'; M-Onguéné 36' | | | Stadium: Ahmadou Ahidjo; Attendance: 40,000; Referee: Banga Jorge (Central African Republic) |
Note: Ângelo / Agostinho, Garcia (substituted off) , Lourenço, Ndongala / Amândio, Barros, Mascarenhas, Zeca / Alves (substituted off) , Ndunguidi – Mendinho (substituted on) , Mateus (substituted on)

== Friendlies ==
D'Agosto played a series of matches in preparation for that season's CAF club competitions whereas São Tomé was preparing for the qualification matches for the 2002 FIFA world cup. The matches were also played as a fund raiser for victims of floods in Mozambique.

| Tue, 4 Apr 2000 | 1º de Agosto (Angola) | 2–1 | (São Tomé and Príncipe) São Tomé | Luanda |
| 15:00 WAT (UTC+1) | | | | Stadium: Cidadela |

| Sun, 12 Mar 2000 | São Tomé (São Tomé and Príncipe) | 2–2 | (Angola) 1º de Agosto | São Tomé |
| 15:00 WAT (UTC+1) | | | | Stadium: 12 de Julho |

On the occasion of the anniversary of Sporting de Benguela, Sporting de Portugal was invited to play a series of matches in Angola.

| Tue, 29 May 1990 | 1º de Agosto (Angola) | 0–1 | Sporting de Portugal | Benguela |
| 15:00 WAT (UTC+1) | | | (pen.) Litos | Stadium: Arregaça |
Note: Ntomas / Arsénio (c), Joaquim, Neto, Russo / Ndisso, Nelito, Valentim / Manuel, Mateus, Vieira Dias – Bila (substituted on) , Bolefo (substituted on) , Kiss (substituted on) , Moisés (substituted on)

On the occasion of the 2nd Congress of the ruling party, the MPLA, Sporting da Praia from Cape Verde was invited to play a series of matches in Angola.

| Wed, 27 Nov 1985 | 1º de Agosto (Angola) | 1–1 | (Cape Verde) Sporting da Praia | Luanda |
| 15:00 WAT (UTC+1) | | | | Stadium: Coqueiros |

On the occasion of the 8th anniversary of the foundation of the Angolan Armed Forces, AS Bilima played a friendly match against D'Agosto in Cabinda

| Thu, 1 Aug 1985 1 | 1º de Agosto (Angola) | 0–1 | (Zaire) AS Bilima | Cabinda |
| 15:00 WAT (UTC+1) | | | 77' Tambwe | Stadium: Tafe |

Primeiro De Agosto was invited to play two friendly matches in Mozambique on the occasion of the 6th anniversary of the Mozambican Armed Forces.

| Sun, 25 Sep 1983 1 | Estrela Vermelha (Mozambique) | 1–1 | (Angola) 1º de Agosto | Matola |
| 15:00 WAT (UTC+1) | Manuel 35' | | 20' Ndunguidi | Stadium: Machava; Referee: Victor Alves |
Note: Ângelo (substituted off) I' / Lenguela (substituted off) II', Lourenço, Novato (substituted off) III', Tandu (substituted off) IV' / Mané, Vieira Dias II (substituted off) V', Zeca / Ndunguidi (substituted off) VI', Nelito, Vieira Dias – Capeló (substituted on) I', Mesquita (substituted on) II', Nelo (substituted on) III', Mário Brás (substituted on) IV', Amândio (substituted on) V', Alves (substituted on) VI'

| Thu, 5 Dec 1981 1 | Desp. de Maputo (Mozambique) | 1–1 | (Angola) 1º de Agosto | Matola |
| 18:00 WAT (UTC+1) | Maluze 55' | | 2' Ivo | Stadium: Machava; Referee: António Alves, Victor Alves, Manuel Pimentel |
Note: Napoleão / Agostinho, Ndongala, Tandu, Zomi / Ivo, Ndunguidi, Nelo / Alves, Mendinho, Zeca

On April 4, 1981, before a 70.000 capacity crowd in Kaduna, Primeiro de Agosto played against then CAN title holders The Green Eagles. In that match that ended in a scoreless draw, D'Agosto put up such a superb performance that the Nigerian supporters and media mistook the club for the Angolan national team.

| Sat, 4 Apr 1981 | Nigeria | 0–0 | (Angola) 1º de Agosto | Kaduna |
| 15:00 WAT (UTC+1) |

A four team tournament was organized to mark the 4th anniversary of the club's foundation. In the first match, D'Agosto was kindly awarded victory as the match ended in a draw and a power outage prevented the match to be decided on penalty shootouts.

| Fri, 1 Aug 1980 1 | 1º de Agosto (Angola) | 2–2 | (Mozambique) Matchedje | Luanda |
| 18:00 WAT (UTC+1) | Nsuka 29'; Ndunguidi 55' | | Pinduca; Geraldo | Stadium: Cidadela |
Note: Rosinha / Kuba, Mesquita, Ndongala, Zomi / Amândio, Mendinho, Nsuka / Alves, Julião, Ndunguidi

| Sun, 3 Aug 1980 2 | 1º de Agosto (Angola) | 1–2 | (Soviet Union) SKA Odessa | Luanda |
| 18:00 WAT (UTC+1) | Alves 1' | | 40', 67' Kristah | Stadium: Cidadela |
Note: Rosinha / Kuba, Mesquita, Ndongala, Zomi / Amândio, Mendinho, Nsuka / Alves, Julião, Ndunguidi

In June 1980, Primeiro de Agosto's reserve team competed in a four-team tournament in Mozambique with the participation of Desportivo de Maputo and D'Agosto's counterparts (military-sponsored teams) from the home country and Zambia, respectively Matchedje and the Green Buffaloes.

| Thu, 19 Jun 1980 1 | Desp. de Maputo (Mozambique) | 0–1 | (Angola) 1º de Agosto | Matola |
| 18:00 WAT (UTC+1) | | | (pen.) Januário | Stadium: Machava |

| Sun, 22 Jun 1980 2 | Matchedje (Mozambique) | 3–4 | (Angola) 1º de Agosto | Matola |
| 18:00 WAT (UTC+1) | | | | Stadium: Machava |

| Sun, 25 Jun 1980 3 | 1º de Agosto (Angola) | 1–2 | (Zambia) Green Buffaloes | Matola |
| 18:00 WAT (UTC+1) | | | | Stadium: Machava |

In December 1979, Sparta Prague - a friendly army club - was invited to play a football match in Luanda.

| Wed, 19 Dec 1979 1 | 1º de Agosto (Angola) | 1–3 | (Czech Republic) Sparta Prague | Luanda |
| 20:30 WAT (UTC+1) | Sabino 74' (pen.) | | 5' Vdovjak; 12' Briza; 82' Stranski | Stadium: Coqueiros; Referee: Manuel Pimentel; Berlas dos Santos, Cardoso Júnior |
Note: Napoleão / Agostinho, Lourenço, Mascarenhas, Ndongala / Amândio, Túbia, Zeca / Barros (substituted off) , Julião, Sabino — Sansão (substituted on)
