= 1998 Girabola =

Angolan Premier League season

Girabola 1998
- Season: 1998 (Apr 18–Nov 22)
- Champions: Primeiro de Agosto
- Relegated: Independente do Tômbwa; Progresso do Sambizanga
- 1998 CAF Champions League: Primeiro de Agosto (Girabola winner)
- 1998 African Cup Winners' Cup: Sagrada Esperança (1998 cup winner)
- 1998 CAF Cup: Académica do Lobito (Girabola runner-up)
- Matches: 210
- Goals: 434 (2.07 per match)
- Top goalscorer: Betinho (14 goals)
- Biggest home win: Petro 5–0 Pro Sam (30 May 1999); Pet Hua 5–0 FC Cab (05 Aug 1999)
- Biggest away win: Kabusc 1–5 1º Agosto (3 May 1998)
- Highest scoring: Kabusc 6–4 Ind. Tomb (28 Jun 1998)

The 1998 Girabola was the 20th season of top-tier football competition in Angola. The season began on April 1, 1998. Primeiro de Agosto were the defending champions.

The league comprised 16 teams, the bottom three of which were relegated to the 1999 Gira Angola.

Primeiro de Agosto were crowned champions, winning their 7th title, while Chicoil, Kabuscorp and SECIL Marítima were relegated.

Alberto Ferreira a.k.a. Betinho of Petro de Luanda finished as the top scorer with 14 goals.

== Changes from the 1997 season ==
Relegated: Benfica do Huambo, Primeiro de Maio
Promoted: Chicoil, SECIL

Locations of the 1998 Girabola teams

== League table ==
Pos	Team	Pld	W	D	L	GF	GA	GD	Pts	Qualification or relegation
1	Primeiro de Agosto (C)	28	18	6	4	37	14	+23	60	Qualification for Champions League
2	Petro de Luanda	28	15	8	5	51	18	+33	53	
3	Rangol (Note: Name later changed to Benfica de Luanda)	28	11	10	7	45	27	+18	43	Qualification for CAF Cup
4	ASA (Note: Kabuscorp were disqualified after forfeiting their matches in rounds 28, 29 and 30. Forfeiting three matches resulted in all their games being annulled and the team subsequently disqualified, in spite of appeals. Also on account of that, ASA finished 3rd and Saneamento Rangol, 4th.)	28	11	7	10	34	22	+12	40	
5	Sagrada Esperança	28	11	7	10	33	33	0	40	
6	Progresso do Sambizanga	28	11	7	10	26	30	−4	40	
7	Sonangol do Namibe (Note: Name later changed to Atlético do Namibe)	28	11	6	11	27	32	−5	39	
8	Onze Bravos (Note: Name later changed to Bravos do Maquis)	28	10	7	11	36	43	−7	37	
9	Independente do Tômbwa	28	10	6	12	36	51	−15	36	
10	Académica do Lobito	28	9	9	10	31	29	+2	36	
11	Petro do Huambo	28	8	11	9	35	35	0	35	
12	FC de Cabinda	28	8	11	9	28	35	−7	35	
13	Sporting de Cabinda	28	9	7	12	37	38	−1	34	
14	Secil Marítima (R)	28	5	9	14	26	41	−15	24	Relegation to Provincial stages
15	Chicoil (R)	28	6	5	17	28	53	−25	23	Relegation to Provincial stages
16	Kabuscorp (D)	0	0	0	0	0	0	0	0	Disqualified

Updated to match(es) played on 22 November 1999. Source: Girabola.com
Rules for classification: 1) Points; 2) Head-to-head points; 3) Head-to-head goal difference; 4) Goal difference; 5) Goals scored; 6) Fair-play points; 7) Play-off.
(C) Champions; (D) Disqualified; (R) Relegated

== Results ==
Home \ Away	11B	ACL	ASA	CHI	FCC	IND	KAB	PET	PHU	PRI	PRO	RAN	SAG	SEC	SON	SCC
11 Bravos	—	–	–	–	1–0	1–1	–	–	–	–	1–0	1–2	1–0	2–2	–	–
Académica do Lobito	3–0	—	1–0	–	3–1	–	0–1	–	–	–	0–0	1–1	1–2	1–0	–	2–0
ASA	–	–	—	2–1	–	1–0	2–0	1–2	3–0	1–0	–	–	–	1–1	2–0	–
Chicoil	2–1	1–1	–	—	–	–	–	–	2–1	–	2–0	–	–	–	–	–
FC de Cabinda	–	–	0–1	3–2	—	1–0	3–2	–	–	0–1	–	–	2–1	0–0	–	–
Independente do Tômbwa	–	–	–	2–0	–	—	–	0–1	2–1	2–1	–	–	–	–	0–0	–
Kabuscorp	3–1	–	–	3–2	–	6–4	—	–	–	1–5	2–1	–	–	1–0	–	3–1
Petro de Luanda	2–1	3–0	–	–	4–0	–	2–0	—	–	–	0–0	2–0	2–2	–	–	3–1
Petro do Huambo	4–2	2–0	–	–	0–0	–	2–1	1–0	—	–	1–0	2–3	–	–	–	1–1
Primeiro de Agosto	2–1	1–0	–	3–0	–	–	–	2–1	3–1	—	–	–	–	–	2–1	2–1
Progresso do Sambizanga	–	–	0–1	–	2–0	2–1	–	–	–	0–0	—	1–1	0–0	1–1	–	–
Rangol	–	–	0–1	1–1	1–2	2–2	1–0	–	–	0–0	–	—	2–1	3–2	–	–
Sagrada Esperança	–	–	2–1	1–0	–	4–1	5–0	–	0–0	0–2	–	–	—	2–1	2–0	–
Sécil Marítima	2–3	–	–	3–2	–	–	–	0–3	1–2	0–1	–	–	–	—	1–0	0–0
Sonangol do Namibe	2–1	1–0	–	–	–	–	2–1	1–0	2–1	–	0–3	1–1	–	–	—	1–2
Sporting de Cabinda	–	–	1–3	–	3–2	–	–	–	–	–	0–0	2–1	1–2	–	–	—

Updated to match(es) played on 31 December 1998. Source: girabola.com
Legend: Blue = home team win; Yellow = draw; Red = away team win.

== Season statistics ==
=== Top scorer ===
- (Angola) Alberto Ferreira Betinho

== Champions ==
1998 Girabola winner

7th title

Squad: Agó, Assis, Castella, Dé, Filipe, Goliath, Gonçalves, H. Cruz, H. Vicente, Isaac, Ismael, Julião, Kiss, L. Carlos, Mendonça, Mfede, Moisés I, Moisés II, Muanza, Ndola, Neto, Nsilulu, Nzalambila, Pedro, Pena, Stopirrá, Xavier
Head coach: Daniel Ndunguidi
