= 1999 Girabola =

Girabola 1999
- Season: 1999 (Apr 18–Nov 22)
- Champions: Primeiro de Agosto
- Relegated: Independente do Tômbwa; Progresso do Sambizanga
- 2000 CAF Champions League: Primeiro de Agosto (Girabola winner)
- 2000 African Cup Winners' Cup: Sagrada Esperança (1999 cup winner)
- 2000 CAF Cup: Académica do Lobito (Girabola runner-up)
- Matches played: 210
- Goals scored: 434 (2.07 per match)
- Top goalscorer: Boelua Lokuli Isaac (16 goals)
- Biggest home win: Petro 5–0 Pro Sam (30 May 1999); Pet Hua 5–0 FC Cab (05 Aug 1999)
- Biggest away win: Pro Sam 1–5 Petro (16 Sep 1999)
- Highest scoring: Pet Hua 7–4 Pro Sam (13 Jun 1999)

The 1999 Girabola was the 21st season of top-tier football competition in Angola. The season ran from 18 April to 22 November 1999. Primeiro de Agosto were the defending champions.

The league comprised 14 teams, the bottom three of which were relegated to the 2000 Gira Angola.

Primeiro de Agosto were crowned champions, winning their 8th title, while Independente do Tômbwa and Progresso do Sambizanga, were relegated.

Boelua Lokuli aka Isaac of Primeiro de Agosto finished as the top scorer with 19 goals.

== Changes from the 1998 season ==
Relegated: Chicoil, Kabuscorp, SECIL
Promoted: Cambondo, Inter de Luanda, Ferroviário da Huíla *

- Note: Ferroviário da Huíla withdrew after being promoted, hence the tournament was contested by 15 teams, instead of 16.
Locations of the 1999 Girabola teams

== League table ==
Pos	Team	Pld	W	D	L	GF	GA	GD	Pts	Qualification or relegation
1	Primeiro de Agosto (C)	28	16	11	1	33	13	+20	59	Qualification for Champions League
2	Académica do Lobito	28	14	9	5	30	17	+13	51	Qualification for CAF Cup
3	Interclube	28	13	10	5	35	23	+12	49	
4	Petro de Luanda	28	15	3	10	49	23	+26	48	
5	Petro do Huambo	28	12	8	8	40	31	+9	44	
6	ASA	26	13	5	8	47	29	+18	44	
7	Sagrada Esperança	28	11	7	10	32	31	+1	40	
8	Rangol (Note: Name later changed to Benfica de Luanda)	28	8	10	10	26	30	−4	34	
9	FC de Cabinda	28	8	9	11	24	34	−10	33	
10	Sonangol do Namibe (Note: Name later changed to Atlético do Namibe)	28	7	11	10	25	25	0	32	
11	Cambondo	28	7	10	11	20	26	−6	31	
12	Sporting de Cabinda	28	8	7	13	27	41	−14	31	
13	Onze Bravos (Note: Name later changed to Bravos do Maquis)	28	7	9	12	19	29	−10	30	
14	Independente do Tômbwa (R)	28	5	10	13	17	34	−17	25	Relegation to Provincial stages
15	Progresso do Sambizanga (R)	28	3	8	17	22	53	−31	17	Relegation to Provincial stages

Updated to match(es) played on 22 November 1999. Source: Girabola.com
Rules for classification: 1) Points; 2) Head-to-head points; 3) Head-to-head goal difference; 4) Goal difference; 5) Goals scored; 6) Fair-play points; 7) Play-off.
(C) Champions; (R) Relegated

== Results ==
Home \ Away	11B	ACL	ASA	CAM	FCC	IND	INT	PET	PHU	PRI	PRO	RAN	SAG	SON	SCC
11 Bravos	—	0–0	2–1	0–0	0–1	2–0	1–1	1–0	0–1	1–3	1–0	0–0	1–0	1–0	3–1
Académica do Lobito	0–0	—	1–2	1–0	2–0	2–1	0–2	1–0	1–1	0–0	3–0	2–1	1–0	2–1	2–1
ASA	1–0	1–2	—	1–1	3–0	2–2	0–1	0–0	4–1	0–1	1–0	0–2	2–0	1–0	4–0
Cambondo	2–1	0–2	0–2	—	0–1	1–0	0–0	1–0	1–0	0–0	1–2	0–0	0–0	0–0	0–0
FC de Cabinda	1–1	0–1	0–1	0–1	—	2–1	1–0	1–0	2–0	0–1	2–2	2–0	0–0	1–1	1–1
Independente do Tômbwa	2–0	1–1	1–0	0–0	1–0	—	1–1	0–1	0–1	0–0	0–0	0–0	1–3	0–0	2–0
Interclube	1–1	0–0	0–3	3–2	0–0	3–0	—	0–1	4–2	1–1	2–1	1–0	2–1	2–1	1–1
Petro de Luanda	3–0	0–0	3–5	2–1	4–0	4–0	3–1	—	3–2	0–1	5–0	3–0	4–1	1–1	3–0
Petro do Huambo	2–2	0–0	3–0	1–1	5–0	3–0	1–1	0–1	—	1–0	7–4	1–0	1–0	1–0	3–2
Primeiro de Agosto	0–0	1–0	1–0	2–1	2–2	3–0	0–0	1–0	1–0	—	2–0	2–2	0–0	2–1	2–0
Progresso do Sambizanga	1–1	1–1	0–0	1–3	1–3	1–1	0–2	1–5	0–1	0–1	—	0–3	0–1	1–1	1–0
Rangol	1–0	2–1	2–0	1–2	1–0	1–3	1–2	1–0	0–0	2–2	0–0	—	1–1	2–1	0–0
Sagrada Esperança	3–1	1–0	2–2	2–1	3–2	1–0	2–0	1–2	2–0	1–1	0–1	2–1	—	2–1	2–4
Sonangol do Namibe	1–0	1–3	1–1	2–0	1–1	0–0	0–0	1–0	1–1	0–1	3–2	2–0	0–0	—	2–0
Sporting de Cabinda	1–0	0–1	1–0	2–1	1–1	2–0	0–2	2–1	1–1	1–2	3–2	1–1	2–1	0–2	—

Updated to match(es) played on 21 November 1999. Source: girabola.com
Legend: Blue = home team win; Yellow = draw; Red = away team win.

== Season statistics ==
=== Top scorer ===
- (Angola) Boelua Lokuli Isaac

== Champions ==
1999 Girabola winner
Clube Desportivo Primeiro de Agosto
8th title

Squad: Almeida, Assis, Dé, Ekobolo, Filipe, Goliath, Gonçalves, Isaac, Julião, Mara, Maninho Loide, Mendonça, Moisés II, Muanza, Neto, Nzalambila, Pedro, Stopirrá
Head coach: Daniel Ndunguidi
