= 1996 Girabola =

Girabola 1996
- Season: 1996 (–)
- Champions: 1º de Agosto
- Relegated: Nacional
- 1997 CAF Champions League: 1º de Agosto (Girabola winner)
- 1997 CAF Cup: Petro Luanda (Girabola 2nd place)
- Matches played: 195
- Top goalscorer: César Caná (15 goals)

The 1996 Girabola was the 18th season of top-tier football competition in Angola. Atlético Petróleos de Luanda were the defending champions.

The league comprised 13 teams, the bottom one of which were relegated.

Primeiro de Agosto were crowned champions, winning their 6th title, while Nacional de Benguela were relegated.

César Caná of Académica do Lobito finished as the top scorer with 15 goals.

== Changes from the 1995 season ==
Relegated: FC de Cabinda, Sonangol do Namibe, Sporting de Luanda, Sporting do Lubango
Promoted: Benfica do Huambo, Sagrada Esperança, Saneamento Rangol

Locations of the 1996 Girabola teams

== League table ==
Pos	Team	Pld	W	D	L	GF	GA	GD	Pts	Qualification or relegation
1	Primeiro de Agosto (C)	24	15	7	2	36	16	+20	52	Qualification for Champions League
2	Petro de Luanda	23	15	4	4	38	19	+19	49	Qualification for CAF Cup
3	Sagrada Esperança	24	14	6	4	40	17	+23	48	
4	Académica do Lobito	24	10	4	10	24	28	−4	34	
5	Rangol (Note: Name later changed to Benfica de Luanda)	24	9	6	9	28	30	−2	33	
6	Petro do Huambo	24	9	4	11	27	31	−4	31	
7	Progresso do Sambizanga	24	8	6	10	24	27	−3	30	
8	Desportivo da EKA	24	7	9	8	29	34	−5	30	
9	ASA	24	7	8	9	26	31	−5	29	
10	Independente do Tômbwa	24	6	7	11	19	27	−8	25	
11	Primeiro de Maio	24	6	5	13	24	26	−2	23	
12	Benfica do Huambo	24	5	7	12	24	39	−15	22	
13	Nacional de Benguela (R)	24	4	8	12	17	33	−16	20	Relegation to Provincial stages

Updated to match(es) played on 22 November 1996. Source: Girabola.com
Rules for classification: 1) Points; 2) Head-to-head points; 3) Head-to-head goal difference; 4) Goal difference; 5) Goals scored; 6) Fair-play points; 7) Play-off.
(C) Champions; (R) Relegated

== Results ==
Home \ Away	ACL	ASA	BHU	EKA	IND	NAC	PET	PHU	PRI	MAI	PRO	RAN	SAG
Académica do Lobito	—												
ASA		—											
Benfica do Huambo			—										
Desportivo da EKA				—									
Independente do Tômbwa					—								
Nacional de Benguela						—							
Petro de Luanda							—						
Petro do Huambo								—					
Primeiro de Agosto									—				
Primeiro de Maio										—			
Progresso do Sambizanga											—		
Rangol												—	
Sagrada Esperança													—

Updated to match(es) played on 22 November 1996. Source: girabola.com
Legend: Blue = home team win; Yellow = draw; Red = away team win.

== Season statistics ==
=== Top scorer ===
- (Angola) César Caná

== Champions ==
1996 Girabola winner
Clube Desportivo Primeiro de Agosto
6th title

Squad: Assis, Bifex, Castella, Fuidimau, Gonçalves, Hélder Cruz, Hélder Vicente, Kiss, Milonga, Moisés, Muanza, Ndisso, Nelo Jorge, Neto, Nhanga, Ntomas, Pedro, Pena, Quim Faria, Roque, Serginho, Stopirrá
Head coach: Mário Calado
