= Sufian (disambiguation) =

Sufian is a city which is the capital of Sufian District, Iran.

Sufian may also refer to:

== Places ==
- Sufian, Afghanistan
- Sufian, India village in Ajnala tehsil, Amritsar district, Punjab, India
- Sufian, Fars, Iran
- Sufian, Golestan, a village in Iran
- Sufian, Kurdistan, Iran
- Sufian, Oshnavieh, West Azerbaijan Province, Iran
- Sufian, Urmia, West Azerbaijan Province, Iran
- Sufian District, Iran

== People ==
- Sufian or Sufyan, Muslim name for males
- Sufian Allaw (born 1944), current Minister of Petroleum and Mineral Resources of Syria
- Sufian Abdullah, Jordanian professional association football player of Palestinian origin
- Sufjan Stevens (born 1975), American singer-songwriter and multi-instrumentalist
- Abu Sufyan ibn Harb (560-653), leader of the Quraish tribe of Mecca
- Sufyan ibn `Uyaynah (725-814), eighth century Islamic religious scholar from Mecca
- Sufyan al-Thawri (716-778), eighth century tabi'i Islamic scholar, Hafiz and jurist, founder of the Thawri madhhab

== See also ==
- Sofiane (disambiguation)
- Sufi (disambiguation)
- Sufism (disambiguation)
- Sufyani an evil, apocryphal character of Islamic eschatology
