= Sofiane =

Sofiane, alternatives Soufian, Soufiane, Sofian, Sefiane, Sofyane, Sufian, Sofyan, or Soufyane (Arabic: سفيان, romanized: Sufyān) is a given Arabic name. It may refer to:

== Mononym ==
- Sofiane (rapper), French rapper Sofiane Zermani
- Sofiane (singer), French singer and Star Academy and Les Anges de la télé-réalité contestant Sofiane Tadjine-Lambert

== First name ==
=== Soufian ===
- Soufian Benyamina (born 1990), German footballer
- Soufian Echcharaf (born 1994), Dutch footballer
- Soufian El Hassnaoui (born 1989), Dutch-Moroccan footballer
- Soufian Moro (born 1993), Dutch footballer

=== Soufiane ===
- Soufiane Alloudi (born 1983), Moroccan footballer
- Soufiane Dadda (born 1990), Dutch-Moroccan footballer
- Soufiane Eddyani, Belgian rapper of Moroccan descent
- Soufiane Koné (born 1980), French footballer
- Soufiane Kourdou (born 1985), Moroccan basketball player
- Soufiane Laghmouchi (born 1990), Moroccan footballer
- Soufiane Sankhon, French karateka

=== Sofian ===
- Sofian Benzaim (born 1980), better known as Sofian, Norwegian soul artist of Algerian origin
- Sofian Boghiu (1912-2002), Romanian Orthodox hieromonk, church painter, confessor and spiritual father

=== Sofiane ===
- Sofiane Attaf (born 1983), Algerian footballer
- Sofiane el Azizi (born 1979), Algerian fencer and Olympian
- Sofiane Azzedine (born 1980), Algerian footballer
- Sofiane Bencharif (born 1986), French-Algerian footballer
- Sofiane Bengoureïne (born 1984), Algerian footballer
- Sofiane Bezzou (born 1981), French-born Algerian footballer
- Sofiane Boufal (born 1993), French-born Moroccan footballer
- Sofiane Cherfa (born 1984), Algerian footballer
- Sofiane Daid (born 1982), Algerian swimmer and Olympian
- Sofiane Daoud (born 1975), Algerian footballer
- Sofiane Djebarat (born 1983), Algerian footballer
- Sofiane el-Fassila (1975–2007), Algerian terrorist, second-in-command of Al Qaeda in North Africa
- Sofiane Feghouli (born 1989), Algerian footballer
- Sofiane Hamdi, Algerian Paralympic athlete
- Sofiane Hanitser (born 1984), Algerian footballer
- Sofiane Hanni (born 1990), Algerian footballer
- Sofiane Harkat (born 1984), Algerian footballer
- Sofiane Khedairia (born 1989), Algerian footballer
- Sofiane Khelili (born 1989), Algerian footballer
- Sofiane Labidi (born 1977), Tunisian sprinter
- Sofiane Melliti (born 1978), Tunisian footballer
- Sofiane Pamart (born 1990), French pianist
- Sofiane Sebihi (born 1979), Algerian boxer
- Sofiane Sylve (born 1976), French ballet dancer
- Sofiane Taïbi (born 1987), Algerian footballer
- Sofiane Younès (born 1982), Algerian footballer

=== Sofiene ===
- Sofiene Chaari (1962–2011), Tunisian actor
- Sofiene Zaaboub (born 1983), French-Algerian footbaler

== Family name ==
- Ahmed Soufiane, Qatari footballer
- Youssef Sofiane (born 1984), French-Algerian footballer

== See also ==
- Sufian (disambiguation)
- Sufi (disambiguation)
- Sufism (disambiguation)
- Sufyan
