= Bashanabad =

Bashanabad Bāshanābād
- Location in Afghanistan
- Coordinates: 36°47′06″N 71°05′30″E
- Country: Afghanistan
- Province: Badakhshan Province
- District: Wurduj
- Time zone: + 4.30

Bashanabad is a village in Wurduj District, Badakhshan Province in north-eastern Afghanistan.

== Geography ==
Located not far from the border with Tajikistan, it lies west of the Ishkashim Nature Refuge and down the Kokcha River from Baharak. Bashanabad lies near the confluence of the Kokcha River on its eastern bank and another river flowing through the village from the east. It lies in a narrow valley, framed on the northern, western (across the Kokcha River) and southern sides by steep cliffs, a characteristic of the Baharak basin. A small lake lies to the east of the village.

Nearby villages include Qashkana Miana, Chesma Abak and across and beyond the Kokcha, Payzh and Sufian and Umowl.

== History ==
On October 6, 2004, an earthquake struck about 36 kilometres south of Bashanabad, near the village of Sar Ab; the village lies within the area which would have been affected by the earthquake. On June 26, 2008, an improvised explosive device reportedly exploded on a German patrol near Bashanabad, but only resulted in damage.
