= Suffian =

Suffian is a given name. Notable people with the given name include:

- Suffian Awang (born 1971), Malaysian political advisor
- Suffian Hakim (born 1986), Singaporean media professional and author
- Suffian Rahman (1978–2019), Malaysian footballer

== See also ==
- Sufian (disambiguation)
