= Sofian =

Sofian may refer to:

- Alternative of given name Sofiane
- Sofian Benzaim (born 1980), better known as Sofian, Norwegian soul artist of Algerian origin
- Səfiyan, (also Saf’yan and Sofian), a village in the Lachin Rayon of Azerbaijan
- Sufian, a town in the East Azerbaijan Province of Iran
- Sibarani Sofian, an Indonesian architect and urban planner
