= Sufyan =

Sufyan (Arabic: سُفْيَان, romanized: Sufyān) is an Arabic name.

- Nader Sufyan Abbas (born 1975), Qatari weightlifter
- Abu Sufyan Al-Azdi (1973–2013), Saudi Arabian deputy leader of the terrorist group Al-Qaeda in the Arabian Peninsula
- Khaled bin Sufyan Al-Hathali (died 625), belonged to the Banu Lahyan tribe at the time of the Islamic Prophet Muhammad
- Abu Sufyan ibn Harb (560–652), leader of the Quraish tribe of Mecca
- Muawiyah ibn-abi-Sufyan or Muawiyah I (602–680) established the Umayyad Dynasty of the caliphate
- Sufyan Ben Qumu or Abu Sufian bin Qumu (born 1959), citizen of Libya held in Guantanamo Bay detention camps, in Cuba
- Abu Sufyan ibn al-Harith, son of Ḥārith ibn Abd al-Muttalib and a sahaba (companion) and a cousin of Muhammad
- Ramla bint Abi Sufyan (c. 594–666), a wife of Muhammad and therefore a Mother of the Believers
- Sufjan Stevens (born 1975), American singer
- Sufyan al-Thawri (716–778), tabi'i Islamic scholar, Hafiz and jurist, founder of the Thawri madhhab
- Sufyan ibn `Uyaynah (725–814), prominent eighth-century Islamic religious scholar from Mecca
- Yazid ibn Abi Sufyan (died 639), one of the companions of Muhammad
- Yazid Ibn Muawiyah Ibn Abu Sufyan or Yazid I, (647–683), the second Caliph of the Umayyad Caliphate
- Ziyad ibn Abi Sufyan (622-673), Muslim general and administrator and a member of the clan of the Umayyads

== See also ==
- Harf Sufyan District, district of the 'Amran Governorate, Yemen
- Sufan (disambiguation)
- Sufyani
- Sofiane (disambiguation)
