= Sufi (disambiguation) =

Sufi refers to practitioners of Sufism or to topics related to Sufism.

Sufi may also refer to:

- "Sufi" (song), the Turkish entry in the Eurovision Song Contest 1988, performed by MFÖ
- Naren Ray, a Bengali cartoonist commonly known as "Sufi"
- The Sufis, one of the best known books on Sufism by the writer Idries Shah
- Sufi, Iran (disambiguation), places in Iran

== People with Sufi honorific ==
- Sufi Abdul Hamid African-American religious and labor leader
- Sufi Abu Taleb Egyptian politician
- Sufi Amba Prasad Indian nationalist
- Sufi Iqbal Pakistani religious leader
- Sufia Kamal Bangladeshi writer and activist
- Sufi Muhammad founder of Tehreek-e-Nafaz-e-Shariat-e-Mohammadi (TNSM), a Pakistani militant organisation
- Sufi Shah Inayat Shaheed 17th-century revolutionary from Sindh

== See also ==
- Sufian (disambiguation)
- Sufism (disambiguation)
