= Sufan =

Sufan may refer to:

== China ==
- Sufan movement (1955)

== Iran ==
Sufan (Persian: سوفان) may also be rendered as Soofan, Sofan or Soffan.

- Sufan, alternate name of Ghanem, Iran
- Sufan-e Olya
- Sufan-e Sofla
