= 1998 African Cup Winners' Cup =

Tournament details
- Dates: 30 January - 6 December 1998
- Teams: 39 (from 1 confederation)

Final positions
- Champions: (Tunisia) Espérance (1st title)
- Runners-up: (Angola) Primeiro de Agosto

Tournament statistics
- Matches played: 67
- Goals scored: 195 (2.91 per match)

The 1998 African Cup Winners' Cup was the twenty-fourth season of Africa's second oldest club football tournament organised by CAF. As before, the tournament was open to clubs that won their nation's premier domestic cup.

Espérance of Tunisia won the cup after defeating Angola's Primeiro de Agosto 4-2 in a two-legged final. It was Espérance's first Cup Winners' Cup triumph and their fourth African club title while Primeiro de Agosto made their first appearance in a continental final.

== Association team allocation ==
A total of 39 teams from 39 CAF associations qualified for the tournament after winning their respective premier domestic cups. Of the 39 teams that qualified for the tournament 4 would not participate in it while 1 withdrew and was replaced by another club from its association;

- Teams from the Central African Republic were all disqualified from CAF's competitions because their federation was in debt to CAF. This meant TP USCA Bangui, who were slated to participate in the preliminary round, were not allowed to fulfill their fixtures.
- Congolese club AS Vita Club, who were also due to appear in the preliminary round, withdrew before the tournament started.
- The Senegalese Football Federation withdrew its representative before the tournament began. The name of the club that was to represent Senegal was never given
- Gambian club Hawks, who were set to appear in the First round, withdrew before their first leg tie with U.S.M. Alger.
- Kaizer Chiefs were originally set to represent South Africa but they withdrew before the tournament started. Their place was taken by the team they defeated in the cup final that qualified them for the tournament, Mamelodi Sundowns.

== Format ==
The tournament consisted of five rounds preceding a two-legged final.

- Preliminary round - The 14 lowest ranked teams - whose rankings were determined by their association's performances at previous CAF club tournaments - were drawn against each other in 7 matches consisting of two-legs each.
- First round - The 7 winners from the preliminary round were then drawn against the remaining 25 clubs, resulting in 16 matches consisting of two-legs each.
- Second round - The 16 winners from the first round were then drawn against each other, resulting in 8 matches consisting of two-legs each.
- Quarterfinals - The 8 winners from the second round were then drawn against each other, resulting in 4 matches consisting of two-legs each.
- Semifinals - The 4 victorious quarterfinalists were then drawn against each other in 2 semifinals consisting of two-legs each.
- Final - The victorious semifinalists contested a two-legged final to determine the champion.

The away goals rule was used to determine the victors in the event of a match being tied over the two-legs. If it was not possible to determine a winner using the away goals rule, the tie went to a penalty shootout to determine the winner.

== Preliminary round ==
The first legs were played from 30 January-2 February, and the second legs were played from 13–15 February 1998.

=== Matches ===
Team 1	Agg.	Team 2	1st leg	2nd leg
Tanzania Stars	5-3	(Malawi) Bata Bullets	3-1	2-2
Rwanda FC	7-1	(Seychelles) Saint-Louis FC	6-1	1-0
TP USCA Bangui (Central African Republic)	no result^{[1]}	(Republic of the Congo) Vita Club Mokanda	-	-
Wolaita Tussa (Ethiopia)	3-5	(Eritrea) Red Sea	0-2	3-3
Dragons de l'Ouémé' (Benin)	6-3	(Chad) Gazelle	4-1	2-2
Notwane (Botswana)	8-1	(Lesotho) Bantu FC	4-1	4-0
Vital'O FC (Burundi)	4-4(a)	(Equatorial Guinea) Elá Nguema	2-1	2-3

Notes:

^{^[1]} Due to the Central African Republic's football federation's debt with CAF, all of their clubs were disqualified from CAF's competitions resulting in TP USCA Bangui being removed from the preliminary round of fixtures. This would have resulted in Vita Club Mokanda receiving a bye into the First round but they themselves withdrew from the competition.

== First round ==
The first legs were played from 20–22 March, and the second legs were played from 3–5 April 1998.

=== Matches ===
Team 1	Agg.	Team 2	1st leg	2nd leg
Costa do Sol (Mozambique)	1-1 (4-2 pen)	(Kenya) Eldoret	1-0	0-1
Ismaily (Egypt)	2-2(a)	(Eritrea) Red Sea	2-2	0-0
BCC Lions (Nigeria)	3-3(3-4 pen)	(Benin) Dragons de l'Ouémé	3-0	0-3
Africa Sports (Ivory Coast)	5-0	(Togo) Agaza Lomé	1-0	4-0
Primeiro de Agosto (Angola)	5-3	(Botswana) Notwane	4-0	1-3
AS Marsouins (Réunion)	0-4	(Mauritius) Fire Brigade SC	0-3	0-1
Mamelodi Sundowns (South Africa)	6-1^{[1]}	Tanzania Stars	4-1	2-0
Nkana Red Devils (Zambia)	5-1	Rwanda FC	1-0	4-1
Espérance (Tunisia)	3-1	(Mali) Stade Malien	1-0	2-1
Al-Mourada (Sudan)	0-1	(Uganda) Express Red Eagles	0-0	0-1
U.S.M. Alger (Algeria)	w/o^{[2]}	(The Gambia) Hawks	-	-
Ghapoha Readers (Ghana)	4-1	(Burkina Faso) ASFB	3-0	1-1
Wydad AC (Morocco)	w/o^{[3]}	(Senegal) Unnamed Senegalese representative	-	-
Union Douala (Cameroon)	Bye^{[4]}			
AS Dragons (Democratic Republic of the Congo)	3-0^{[5]}	(Burundi) Vital'O FC	3-0	w/o
AS Kaloum Star (Guinea)	2-2(a)	(Gabon) Mbilinga FC	2-1	0-1

Notes:

^{^[1]} Kaizer Chiefs had originally qualified to represent South Africa in the competition but they withdrew before the start. Mamelodi Sundowns, whom Kaizer Chiefs had beaten in a domestic cup final to qualify for the competition, were allowed to replace Kaizer Chiefs.
^{^[2]} Hawks withdrew from their tie with U.S.M. Alger before the first leg, handing U.S.M. Algers a walkover into the Second Round.
^{^[3]} Following the withdrawal of the Senegalese representative - who had not been named by the Senegalese Football Federation - Wydad Casablanca - who had been set to play the Senegalese representative - received a walkover into the Second Round.
^{^[4]} Union Douala were due to play the winner of the preliminary round tie between TP USCA Bangui and Vita Club Mokanda, but following the disqualification of TP USCA Bangui due to their federation's debt with CAF and Vita Club Mokanda's withdrawal, they received a bye into the Second Round.
^{^[5]} Following AS Dragons' 3-0 home victory over Vital'O FC in the first leg, Vital'O FC withdrew before the second leg, handing AS Dragons a walkover into the Second Round.

== Second round ==
The first legs were played from 24–26 April, and the second legs were played from 8–10 May 1998 with the exception of the second leg between Mbilinga FC and AS Dragons, which was played on May 12.

=== Matches ===
Team 1	Agg.	Team 2	1st leg	2nd leg
Costa do Sol (Mozambique)	7-2	(Eritrea) Red Sea	5-1	2-1
Africa Sports (Ivory Coast)	6-1	(Benin) Dragons de l'Ouémé	3-0	3-1
Fire Brigade SC (Mauritius)	2-9	(Angola) Primeiro de Agosto	2-3	0-6
Nkana Red Devils (Zambia)	2-1	(South Africa) Mamelodi Sundowns	2-1	0-0
Express Red Eagles (Uganda)	1-2	(Tunisia) Espérance	1-0	0-2
Ghapoha Readers (Ghana)	0-2	(Algeria) U.S.M. Alger	0-1	0-1
Union Douala (Cameroon)	1-4	(Morocco) Wydad AC	1-0	0-4
Mbilinga FC (Gabon)	1-0	(Democratic Republic of the Congo) AS Dragons	0-0	1-0

== Quarterfinals ==
The first legs were played from 4–6 September, and the second legs were played from 18–20 September 1998.

=== Matches ===
Team 1	Agg.	Team 2	1st leg	2nd leg
Wydad AC (Morocco)	7-4	(Mozambique) Costa do Sol	6-3	1-1
Mbilinga FC (Gabon)	0-4	(Tunisia) Espérance	0-2	0-2
Nkana Red Devils (Zambia)	1-2	(Ivory Coast) Africa Sports	1-1	0-1
Primeiro de Agosto (Angola)	5-1	(Algeria) U.S.M. Alger	3-0	2-1

== Semifinals ==
The first legs were played on 10 & 11 October, and the second legs were played between 23 & 25 October 1998.

=== Matches ===
Team 1	Agg.	Team 2	1st leg	2nd leg
Espérance (Tunisia)	4-3	(Morocco) Wydad AC	4-1	0-2
Africa Sports (Ivory Coast)	3-5	(Angola) Primeiro de Agosto	3-1	0-4

== Final ==
Team 1	Agg.	Team 2	1st leg	2nd leg
Espérance (Tunisia)	4–2	(Angola) Primeiro de Agosto	3–1	1–1

=== First leg ===
21 November 1998

Espérance (Tunisia)	3 – 1	(Angola) Primeiro de Agosto
Jaïdi 6'; Hamrouni 45' (pen.); Lâaroussi 56'		Teka 1'

Stade El Menzah, Tunis
Attendance: 35,000
Referee: Coffi Codjia (Benin)

=== Second leg ===
6 December 1998

Primeiro de Agosto (Angola)	1 – 1	(Tunisia) Espérance
Nsilulu 42'		Melliti 87'

Estádio da Cidadela, Luanda
Attendance: 38,000

Esperance won the two-legged final 4-2 on aggregate.
