= Sufism (disambiguation) =

Sufism is the Islamic mysticism.

Sufism may also refer to:

== Sufism topics ==
- History of Sufism, a history of Islamic mysticism.
- International Association of Sufism, a nonprofit organization established to open a line of communication among Sufis all around the world
- Philosophical sufism, the schools of thought in Sufism
- Sufism poetry, a mystic poetry in Sufism
- Western Sufism, a new religious movement in the world

== Sufism by country ==
- Sufism in Afghanistan
- Sufism in Algeria
- Sufism in Bangladesh
- Sufism in India
- Sufism in Jordan
- Sufism in Pakistan
- Sufism in Punjab
- Sufism in Sindh
- Sufism in South Asia (disambiguation)
- Sufism in the United States
- Sufism in the Philippines

== See also ==
- Sufi (disambiguation)
- Sufian (disambiguation)
