= Figo (footballer) =

Cape Verdean footballer (born 1986)

Personal information
- Full name: Osvaldo Tavares Oliveira
- Date of birth: 14 July 1986 (age 40)
- Height: 1.81 m (5 ft 11 1/2 in)
- Position: Forward

Team information
- Current team: Vilafranquense
- Number: 11

Senior career*
Years	Team	Apps	(Gls)
2008	Académica da Praia		
2009	Barcelona Tarrafal		
2010	Sporting Praia		
2011	Estrela dos Amadores		
2011–2012	Tourizense	5	(1)
2012–2013	Oriental	27	(12)
2013–2014	1º de Agosto	29	(5)
2015	Recreativo da Caála		
2015	Oriental	11	(0)
2016	Moura	14	(1)
2016–	Vilafranquense	27	(4)
- * Club domestic league appearances and goals as of 9 April 2017

Osvaldo Tavares Oliveira, known as Figo (born 14 July 1986), is a Cape Verdean football player who plays as a forward for Vilafranquense.

== Club career ==
He made his professional debut in the Segunda Liga for Oriental on 22 August 2015 in a game against Porto B.
