= Childran Djodjo Miangounina =

Congolese professional footballer (born 1989)

Childran Miangounina
Personal information
- Full name: Childran Djodjo Miangounina
- Date of birth: 17 February 1989 (age 37)
- Place of birth: Congo
- Position: Defender

Team information
- Current team: AC Léopards

Childran Djodjo Miangounina is a Congolese professional footballer who plays as a defender for AC Léopards.

== International career ==
In January 2014, coach Claude Leroy, invited him to be a part of the Congo squad for the 2014 African Nations Championship. The team was eliminated in the group stages after losing to Ghana, drawing with Libya and defeating Ethiopia.
