= Sufi Iqbal =

Mufti Sufi Iqbal is a Muslim religious leader and member of the Tableeghi Jamaat in Pakistan. Many of his followers were involved in the Pakistan coup attempt of 1995.
