= Sufian, Kurdistan =

Sufian صوفيان
- Village
- Location within Iran
- Coordinates: 35°23′45″N 46°56′05″E
- Country: Iran
- Province: Kurdistan
- County: Sanandaj
- Bakhsh: Central
- Rural District: Arandan

Population (2006)
  - Total: 271
- Time zone: UTC+3:30 (IRST)
  - Summer (DST): UTC+4:30 (IRDT)

Sufian (Persian: صوفيان, also Romanized as Şūfīān, Şūfeyān, and Sūfiyān) is a village in Arandan Rural District, in the Central District of Sanandaj County, Kurdistan Province, Iran. At the 2006 census, its population was 271, in 62 families. The village is populated by Kurds.
