= Sufan-e Sofla =

Village in Khuzestan, Iran

Sufan-e Sofla سوفان سفلي
- Village
- Location within Iran
- Coordinates: 31°51′01″N 48°59′19″E
- Country: Iran
- Province: Khuzestan
- County: Shushtar
- Bakhsh: Central
- Rural District: Miyan Ab-e Shomali

Population (2006)
  - Total: 251
- Time zone: UTC+3:30 (IRST)
  - Summer (DST): UTC+4:30 (IRDT)

Sufan-e Sofla (Persian: سوفان سفلي, also Romanized as Sūfān-e Soflá; also known as Soffān-e Pā’īn) is a village in Miyan Ab-e Shomali Rural District, in the Central District of Shushtar County, Khuzestan Province, Iran. At the 2006 census, its population was 251, in 51 families.
