= James Sangala =

Malawian footballer

Personal information
- Date of birth: 20 August 1986 (age 40)
- Place of birth: Malawi
- Height: 1.76 m (5 ft 9 1/2 in)
- Position: Defender

Team information
- Current team: Đắk Lắk

Senior career*
| Years | Team | Apps | (Gls) |
| 2005–2007 | Mighty Wanderers | ? | (?) |
| 2007–2008 | Thanda Royal Zulu | 34 | (0) |
| 2008–2010 | Primeiro de Agosto | ? | (?) |
| 2012–2013 | Benfica Luanda | ? | (?) |
| 2014– | Đắk Lắk | 0 | (0) |

International career^{‡}
| 2006– | Malawi | 30 | (0) |
- * Club domestic league appearances and goals as of 12:38, 18 March 2011 (UTC) ‡ National team caps and goals as of 12:38, 18 March 2011 (UTC)

James Sangala (born 20 August 1986) is a Malawian international footballer who plays as a defender.

== Career ==
Sangala began his career in Malawi with MTL Wanderers, before playing in South Africa for Thanda Royal Zulu.

== International career ==
He made his international debut in 2006.
