= Imadu Dooyum =

Nigerian footballer

Personal information
- Full name: Japhet Dooyum Imadu
- Date of birth: 24 November 1980 (age 45)
- Place of birth: Nigeria
- Height: 1.78 m (5 ft 10 in)
- Position: Midfielder

Team information
- Current team: AkwaUnited F.C.

Senior career*
Years	Team	Apps	(Gls)
1999	BCC Lions		
2000–2003	Lobi Stars F.C.		
2004	Enugu Rangers		
2004–2008	Bendel Insurance F.C.		
2008–	Akwa United F.C.		

International career^{‡}
1999–2004	Nigeria	9	(0)
- * Club domestic league appearances and goals as of 21 April 2008 ‡ National team caps and goals as of 20 May 2002

Imadu Dooyum (born 24 November 1980) is a Nigerian football player currently playing for Akwa United F.C. In August 2004 he was on trial with KV Mechelen.
