= António Neto (footballer, born 1971) =

Angolan footballer

Personal information
- Full name: António João Neto
- Date of birth: October 10, 1971 (age 55)
- Place of birth: Angola
- Position: Defender

International career
Years	Team	Apps	(Gls)
1992–2001	Angola	59	(1)

António João Neto, nicknamed Miúdo Neto (born October 10, 1971) is an Angolan retired football player. He has played for Angolan side Primeiro de Agosto as well as for the Angolan national team.

== National team career ==
Antonio Neto made his debut in the 1994 World Cup qualifiers in a defeat against Egypt. His first goal came in the same qualifiers, this time against Zimbabwe national football team in a 2-1 defeat (this match determined Angola's non-participation in the World Cup). He also participated in the first time the Palancas Negras went to the Africa Cup in 1996 and in the 1998 AFCON. His last game was in a friendly against Portugal where he was sent off (Angola lost 5-1 and had 4 players sent off).

Angola national team
Year	Apps	Goals
1992	1	0
1993	3	1
1994	2	0
1995	7	0
1996	3	0
1997	7	0
1998	8	0
1999	4	0
2000	9	0
2001	11	0
Total	59	1

== Titles ==
Primeiro de Agosto

- Girabola (5): 1991, 1992, 1996, 1998 and 1999
- Angola Cup (2):1990 and 1991
- SuperTaça de Angola (6): 1991, 1992, 1997, 1998, 1999, 2000

Angola

- 2001 COSAFA Cup
