= Francisco Assis (footballer) =

Angolan footballer

Personal information
- Full name: Francisco Vicente Assis
- Date of birth: 25 December 1974 (age 51)
- Position: Midfielder

International career
Years	Team	Apps	(Gls)
1997–1999	Angola	13	(0)

Francisco Vicente Assis (born 25 December 1974) is an Angolan footballer. He played in 13 matches for the Angola national football team from 1997 to 1999. He was also named in Angola's squad for the 1998 African Cup of Nations tournament.
