= Hugo Marques =

Angolan footballer (born 1986)

Personal information
- Full name: Hugo Miguel Barreto Henriques Marques
- Date of birth: 15 January 1986 (age 40)
- Place of birth: Fão, Portugal
- Height: 1.91 m (6 ft 3 in)
- Position: Goalkeeper

Team information
- Current team: Petro Atlético
- Number: 1

Youth career
- 1997–2002: Varzim
- 2002–2005: Porto

Senior career*
Years	Team	Apps	(Gls)
2005–2006	Porto B	19	(0)
2006	União Lamas	2	(0)
2007	Vila Meã	7	(0)
2007–2010	Gil Vicente	6	(0)
2008–2009	→ Tirsense (loan)	13	(0)
2011–2012	Kabuscorp		
2013–2014	1º Agosto	7	(0)
2015	Kabuscorp	5	(0)
2016–2017	Covilhã	9	(0)
2017–2021	Farense	78	(0)
2021–2022	Cape Town City	32	(0)
2022–	Petro Atlético	88	(0)

International career^{‡}
2004	Portugal U18	2	(0)
2005	Portugal U20	2	(0)
2011–	Angola	24	(0)
- * Club domestic league appearances and goals as of 22:21, 22 December 2025 (UTC) ‡ National team caps and goals as of 18:11, 29 December 2025 (UTC)

Hugo Miguel Barreto Henriques Marques (born 15 January 1986) is an Angolan professional footballer who plays as a goalkeeper for Girabola club Atlético Petróleos de Luanda and the Angola national team.

== Club career ==
Born in Fão, Esposende, Portugal to an Angolan mother and a Mozambican father, Marques played mainly lower league football in the country, joining FC Porto's youth system at the age of 16 and representing its reserves as a senior for three years. He appeared in six Segunda Liga matches for Gil Vicente F.C. in the 2007–08 season, conceding 12 goals.

In 2011, Marques moved to Angola where he appeared for Kabuscorp S.C.P. and C.D. Primeiro de Agosto. He was awarded Angolan nationality shortly after.

Marques returned to Portugal on 25 July 2016, signing a two-year contract with second-division club S.C. Covilhã following a period of trial. He left after only one year, however, joining S.C. Farense of the third tier.

Marques played all 24 games in the 2019–20 campaign (cut short due to the COVID-19 pandemic), as the side from Algarve returned to the Primeira Liga after an 18-year absence. He made his debut in the competition on 20 September 2020 when he came on as a second-half substitute for Rafael Defendi who had been sent off, in an eventual 2–0 away loss against Moreirense FC.

In August 2021, the 35-year-old Marques joined South African Premiership club Cape Town City FC. Subsequently, he returned to the Girabola with Atlético Petróleos de Luanda.

== International career ==
Marques was selected to the Angola squad that was due to appear in the 2012 Africa Cup of Nations. He made no appearances in the tournament, in a group-stage elimination.

On 3 December 2025, Marques was called up to the 2025 Africa Cup of Nations.
