= Sufi, Iran =

Sufi or Soofi or Sowfi (Persian: صوفي) in Iran may refer to:

- Sufi, Kurdistan, a village in Kurdistan Province, Iran
- Sufi, West Azerbaijan, a village in West Azerbaijan Province, Iran
