= Suffian Hakim =

Singaporean writer

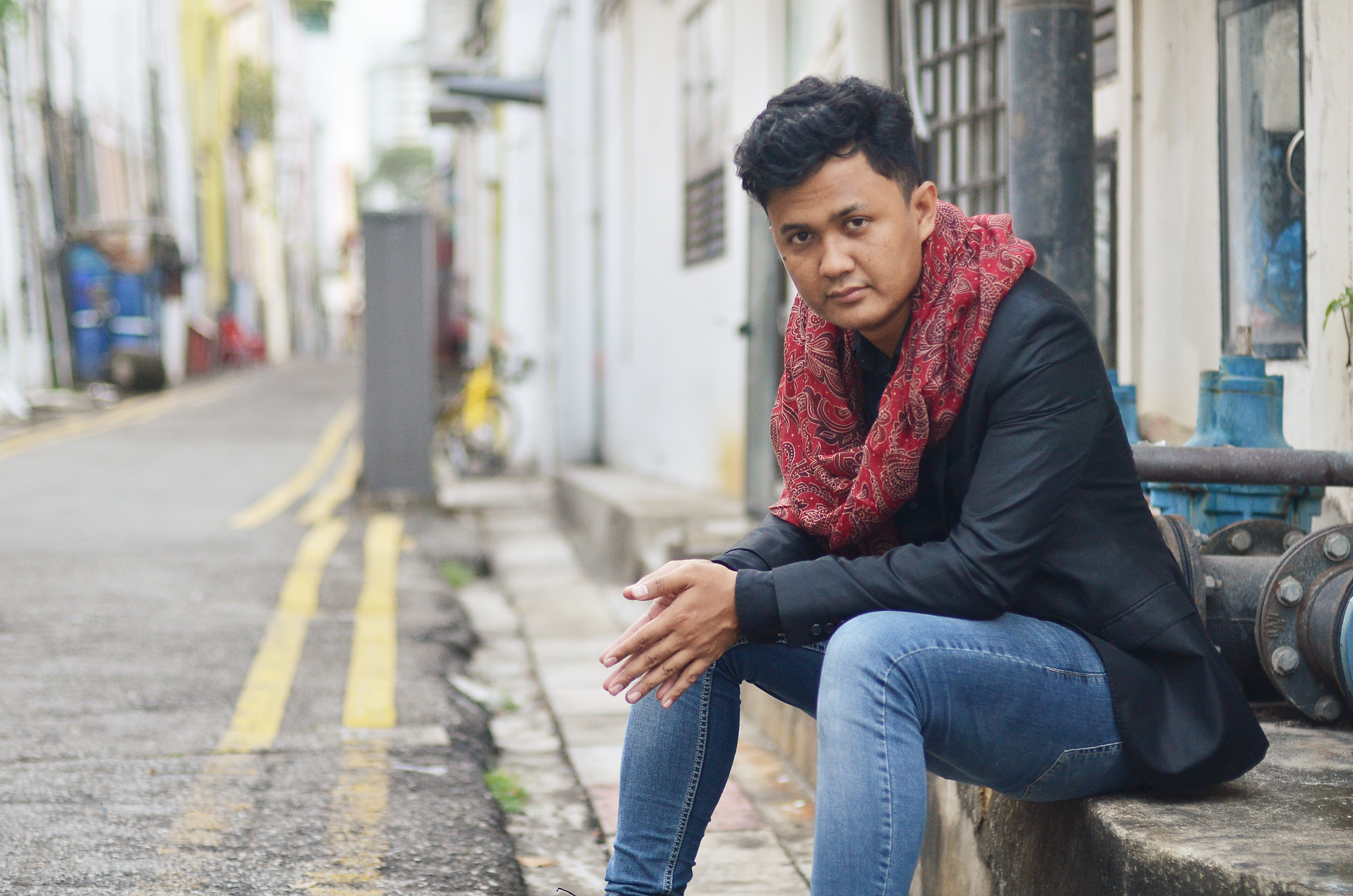
- Suffian Hakim circa 2018
- Born: Suffian Hakim; 24 July 1986 (age 40); Singapore
- Education: Saint Joseph's Institution, Singapore
- Occupations: Writer, media professional
- Spouse: Shelby Sofya Segar
- Writing career
- Language: English
- Genres: satire; parody; comedy
- Notable works: Harris bin Potter and The Stoned Philosopher; The Minorities

Suffian Hakim bin Supoano (born 24 July 1986) is a Singaporean media professional and author known for his novels, Harris bin Potter and The Stoned Philosopher and The Minorities.

He is an alumnus of Saint Joseph's Institution.

== Biography ==
Suffian started writing at a young age. He cites early validation as a writer when he was ten years old, when his school submitted his creative composition for a national essay competition. While studying at St Joseph's Institution, he wrote a dramatic sketch that won first place in a school competition. This gave him early inspiration to pursue writing as a career.

He then attended St Andrew's Junior College, where he studied mathematics, chemistry, and economics instead of literature. Upon failing his GCE 'A' levels, Suffian attended Ngee Ann Polytechnic, graduating in 2009 with a Diploma in Mass Communication.

During his polytechnic studies, he attended an acting module taught by Singaporean actor and director Alaric Tay.

Suffian works as a media professional. He has worked as a screenwriter for Mediacorp productions The Noose and Random Island, and also written for August Man magazine.

== Literary career ==
Described as "one of the most whimsical, creative and unpretentious young voices in Singapore literature", Suffian began dabbling in writing satire while in Ngee Ann Polytechnic, uploading Little Red Riding Tudung and Three Shades of Brown (a parody of Fifty Shades of Grey) to his blog.

=== Harris bin Potter and the Stoned Philosopher ===
He also started writing a parody of Harry Potter where the main character is re-cast as Singaporean Malay during this time, also uploading it to his blog. The stories were then shared widely on social media in Singapore when they were re-launched online in 2013. Following an extensive crowdfunding effort, Suffian self-published 300 copies of Harris bin Potter and the Stoned Philosopher (2015) as one of Publishizer's first book project efforts.

Harris bin Potter was then re-printed with 500 copies, and has since also enjoyed a third print run. It was re-published by Epigram Books in 2019 and released in 2021.

=== The Minorities ===
In 2017, Suffian self-published his second novel, The Minorities, before it was picked up by Epigram Books in October 2018. While maintaining his trademark levity, the novel takes on issues such as ethnicity, immigration, and assimilation in its underlying social commentary.

=== Style and influences ===
Suffian is known for his humorous, satirical writing style, usually employing popular culture references, word play, offbeat characters, and sometimes absurdist situations in his works. While they tend to be humorous, his books also explore issues of ethnicity, identity and assimilation. Literary academic Gwee Li Sui said of the author, "Suffian has the grand talent of writing silly for hours."

In multiple interviews, Suffian has cited Terry Pratchett, Douglas Adams and Neil Gaiman as his influences.

=== Awards ===
In 2017, he was also second runner-up for the Esquire x Montblanc Fiction Writer Prize for his short story, Sang.

In recognition of his work, Apple Singapore named Suffian one of their Red Dot Heroes in 2018.

== Works ==
=== Novels ===
| Year | Title | Publisher | Notes | ISBN |
|---|---|---|---|---|
| 2015 | Harris bin Potter and the Stoned Philosopher | Self-published | | ISBN 9789810792671 |
| 2017 | The Minorities | Epigram Books | Suffian self-published this initially in 2017. | ISBN 9789811140242 |
