= Sufism in South Asia =

Sufism in South Asia includes:

- Sufism in India
- Sufism in Pakistan
  - Sufism in Sindh
- Sufism in Bangladesh
