= Richard Touko =

Cameroonian footballer

Personal information
- Full name: Richard Simplice Touko
- Date of birth: June 22, 1983 (age 43)
- Place of birth: Ngaoundéré, Cameroon
- Height: 1.73 m (5 ft 8 in)
- Position: Defender

Team information
- Current team: Canon Yaounde

Senior career*
Years	Team	Apps	(Gls)
2003–2005	Canon Yaounde	?	(?)
2005–2006	Racing FC Bafoussam		
2006–2007	Cotonsport Garoua	32	(4)
2007–2008	Caïman de Douala		
2008–	Canon Yaounde		

International career
2003–	Cameroon	2	(0)
- * Club domestic league appearances and goals as of February 7, 2007

Richard Touko (born 22 June 1983 in Ngaoundéré) is a Cameroonian footballer who is a defender for Canon Yaounde.

== Club career ==
Touko began his career with Canon Yaounde, and transferred to Racing FC Bafoussam, where he participated in the CAF Champions League 2005. He played for Cotonsport Garoua during the 2006 season.
