= Harry Milanzi =

Zambian footballer (born 1978)

Personal information
- Date of birth: 13 March 1978 (age 48)
- Place of birth: Zambia
- Height: 1.81 m (5 ft 11 in)
- Position: Centre forward

Youth career
- City of Lusaka

Senior career*
Years	Team	Apps	(Gls)
1996–2000	Nchanga Rangers		
2000–2001	Correcaminos UAT	25	(9)
2001–2002	Club Deportivo Zamora	6	(0)
2002–2003	Nchanga Rangers		
2003–2006	Lamontville Golden Arrows	32	(8)
2006–2008	Primeiro de Agosto		
2009	Kabuscorp		
2009	Rec da Caála		
2010–2011	Progresso		
2012–2013	NAPSA Stars		

International career
1998–2005	Zambia	47	(14)
- * Club domestic league appearances and goals

Harry Milanzi (born 13 March 1978) is a former Zambian footballer who played as a striker.

== Early life ==
Milanzi, did his primary education at Regiment Primary School and then proceeded to Kabulonga Boys Secondary School.

== Career ==
He was part of the Zambian 2006 African Nations Cup team, who finished third in group C in the first round of competition, thus failing to secure qualification for the quarter-finals.

In 2015, Milanzi was appointed interim assistant manager of NAPSA Stars alongside Geoffrey Hamakwenda.

=== Doping ban ===
In 2005, Milanzi was banned for 6 six months after he tested positive for cannabis in a doping control.
