= Sufian, Afghanistan =

Sufian
- Location in Afghanistan
- Coordinates: 36°45′48″N 71°4′38″E
- Country: Afghanistan
- Province: Badakhshan Province
- Time zone: + 4.30

Sufian is a village in Badakhshan Province in north-eastern Afghanistan.

== See also ==
- Badakhshan Province
