= Hélder Vicente =

Angolan footballer (born 1975)

Personal information
- Full name: Hélder de Jesus Serafim Vicente
- Date of birth: September 30, 1975 (age 51)
- Place of birth: Angola
- Position: Defender

Senior career*
Years	Team	Apps	(Gls)
1995–2001	1º de Agosto		
2001	Rio Ave	8	(0)
2002–2004	ASA		
2005	Sagrada Esperança		
2005–2010	Petro de Luanda		

International career
1994–2002	Angola	40	(0)
- * Club domestic league appearances and goals

Hélder de Jesus Serafim Vicente, also known as Hélder Vicente (born September 30, 1975) is an Angolan football player. He has played for the Angolan national team.

Vicente is the only Angolan player to have been a champion in all four Angolan clubs where he played in the Girabola.

== National team statistics ==
Angola national team
Year	Apps	Goals
1994	-	0
1995		0
1996	-	0
1997		0
1998		0
1999		0
2000		0
2001		0
2002		0
Total	40	0
