= Filipe Nzanza =

Angolan footballer

Personal information
- Date of birth: April 21, 1970 (age 56)
- Place of birth: Angola
- Position: Midfielder

International career
Years	Team	Apps	(Gls)
1999–2003	Angola	31	(0)

Filipe Nzanza (born April 21, 1970) is a retired Angolan football player. He has played for Angola national team and for Clube Desportivo Primeiro de Agosto.

== National team statistics ==
Angola national team
Year	Apps	Goals
1999	2	0
2000	0	0
2001	12	0
2002	2	0
2003	3	0
Total	19	0
