= Independente Sport Clube =

Angolan football club

Independente (Tômbwa)
- Full name: Independente Sport Clube
- Founded: 1928
- Ground: Campo do Independente, Angola
- Capacity: 3000

Independente Sport Clube, formerly Independente de Porto Alexandre, is an Angolan football club based in the town of Tômbwa in Angola's southern province of Namibe.

In 1969, 70 and 71 the team has won the Angolan Provincial Championship.

== Honours ==
- Angolan Provincial Championship: 3

1969, 1970, 1971

- Angolan Super Cup: 1

1995

== Manager history ==
(Angola) António Lopes Chiby	(1994)	-	1995
(Angola) Luzolo Gomes	(1997)	-

== See also ==
- Girabola
- Gira Angola
