= Makaya Nsilulu =

Democratic Republic of the Congo footballer

Personal information
- Date of birth: 5 May 1977 (age 49)
- Place of birth: Zaire
- Height: 1.75 m (5 ft 9 in)
- Position: Midfielder

Senior career*
Years	Team	Apps	(Gls)
1995–1996	US Kintambo		
1997–1998	1º de Agosto		
1999–2002	Espérance Sportive de Tunis		
2002	ES Zarzis		
2002–2004	AS Djerba		
2004	Neuchâtel Xamax	15	(0)
2004–2005	Al-Ahli SC		
2005–2006	ES Zarzis		

International career^{‡}
1999–2000	DR Congo	9	(0)
- * Club domestic league appearances and goals as of 17 May 2016 ‡ National team caps and goals as of 17 May 2016

Makaya Nsilulu (born 5 May 1977) is a retired footballer from DR Congo.

Nsilulu was a member of the DR Congo squad for the 2000 Africa Cup of Nations.
