= Sofiane Melliti =

Tunisian footballer

Personal information
- Full name: Sofiane Melliti
- Date of birth: 18 August 1978 (age 48)
- Place of birth: Siliana, Tunisia
- Height: 1.78 m (5 ft 10 in)
- Position: Midfielder

Senior career*
Years	Team	Apps	(Gls)
1998–2001	Espérance		
2001–2002	Olympique Beja		
2002–2003	CA Bizertin		
2003–2004	Hammam-Lif		
2004–2006	Vorskla Poltava	30	(1)
2006-2007	Gaziantepspor	14	(0)
2007–2008	Hammam-Lif		

International career
1998–2006	Tunisia	17	(1)
- * Club domestic league appearances and goals

Sofiane Melliti (Arabic: سفيان مليتي; born 18 August 1978) is a Tunisian former footballer who played as a midfielder.

Melliti scored his first goal for the Tunisian national team in January 2006, and played one match at the upcoming 2006 African Cup of Nations. In May he was called up to the 2006 World Cup. In January 2009, Al Hilal of Libya, having made several negotiations to sign him previously, are still deliberating a deal for him

== Career statistics ==
=== International ===
Appearances and goals by national team and year
National team	Year	Apps	Goals
Tunisia	1998	2	0
Tunisia	1999	3	0
Tunisia	2000	3	0
Tunisia	2001	–	
Tunisia	2002	–	
Tunisia	2003	–	
Tunisia	2004	–	
Tunisia	2005	2	0
Tunisia	2006	7	1
Total		17	1

Scores and results list Tunisia's goal tally first, score column indicates score after each Melliti goal.

List of international goals scored by Soufiane Melliti
No.	Date	Venue	Opponent	Score	Result	Competition
1	15 January 2006	7 November Stadium, Radès, Tunisia	Ghana	1–0	2–0	Friendly
