= Matumona Lundala =

Angolan footballer

Goliath
Personal information
- Date of birth: August 1, 1972 (age 54)
- Place of birth: Kinshasa, Congo DR
- Height: 1.81 m (5 ft 11 1/2 in)
- Position: Goalkeeper

International career
Years	Team	Apps	(Gls)
2001–2006	Angola	20	(0)

Matumona Lundala known most simply as Goliath (born August 1, 1972, in Esperança) is an Angolan goalkeeper who won the 2005 Angolan Cup with Sagrada Esperança. He is measured at 1.81 m (5 ft 11 in) and 92 kg (202 lb or 14 st 4 lb). He was also a member of the Angolan squad at the African Cup of Nations in 2006 acting as experienced back-up for first-choice shotstopper João Ricardo.

== National team statistics ==
Angola national team
Year	Apps	Goals
2001	9	0
2002	2	0
Total	11	0
