= Edgar Jerónimo =

Angolan footballer

Stopirra
Personal information
- Date of birth: December 25, 1978 (age 47)
- Place of birth: Angola
- Position: Midfielder

International career
Years	Team	Apps	(Gls)
1999–2005	Angola	31	(1)

Edgar Jerónimo, best known as Stopirra (born December 25, 1978) is a retired Angolan football player. He has played for Angolan side Primeiro de Agosto as well as for the Angolan national team.

== National team statistics ==
Angola national team
Year	Apps	Goals
2001	8	0
2002	2	0
2003	2	0
2004	3	0
2005	1	0
Total	16	0
