= 2013 Africa Cup of Nations knockout stage =

2013 African cup match

The knockout stage of the 2013 Africa Cup of Nations was the second and final stage of the competition, following the group stage. It began on 2 February with the round of 16 and ended on 10 February 2013 with the final held at the FNB Stadium in Johannesburg. A total of 8 teams (the top two teams from each group) advanced to the knockout stage to compete in a single-elimination style tournament.

All match times are local, SAST (UTC+2).

== Format ==
In the knockout stage, except for the third place play-off, if a match was level at the end of 90 minutes of normal playing time, extra time was played (two periods of 15 minutes each). If still tied after extra time, the match was decided by a penalty shoot-out to determine the winner. In the third place play-off, if the scores remained level after 90 minutes the match would go directly to a penalty shoot-out, without any extra time being played.

== Qualified teams ==
The top two placed teams from each of the four groups advanced to the knockout stage.

Group	Winners	Runners-up
A	South Africa	Cape Verde
B	Ghana	Mali
C	Burkina Faso	Nigeria
D	Ivory Coast	Togo

== Bracket ==
Quarter-finals
2 February – Durban
South Africa	1 (1)
Mali (p)	1 (3)
3 February – Rustenburg
Ivory Coast	1
Nigeria	2
3 February – Nelspruit
Burkina Faso (a.e.t.)	1
Togo	0
2 February – Port Elizabeth
Ghana	2
Cape Verde	0

Semi-finals
6 February – Durban
Mali	1
Nigeria	4
6 February – Nelspruit
Burkina Faso (p)	1 (3)
Ghana	1 (2)

Final
10 February – Johannesburg
Nigeria	1
Burkina Faso	0
Third place play-off
9 February – Port Elizabeth
Mali	3
Ghana	1

All times are South African Standard Time (UTC+2)

== Quarter-finals ==
=== Ghana vs. Cape Verde ===
2 February 2013
17:00

Ghana	2–0	Cape Verde
Wakaso 54' (pen.), 90+5'	Report

Nelson Mandela Bay Stadium, Port Elizabeth
Attendance: 8,000
Referee: Rajindraparsad Seechurn (Mauritius)

Ghana	Cape Verde

GK	16	Fatau Dauda
RB	4	John Paintsil	(yellow card) 63'
CB	21	John Boye
CB	15	Isaac Vorsah
LB	23	Harrison Afful	(yellow card) 68'
DM	11	Mohammed Rabiu	(yellow card) 27'	(substituted off) 84'
RM	10	Albert Adomah		(substituted off) 47'
CM	8	Emmanuel Agyemang-Badu
LM	7	Christian Atsu		(substituted off) 78'
SS	20	Kwadwo Asamoah
CF	3	Asamoah Gyan (c)
Substitutions:
FW	22	Mubarak Wakaso		(substituted on) 47'
MF	14	Solomon Asante		(substituted on) 78'
MF	9	Derek Boateng		(substituted on) 84'
Manager:
James Kwesi Appiah

GK	1	Vozinha
RB	23	Carlitos	(yellow card) 53'
CB	3	Fernando Varela
CB	6	Nando (c)
LB	18	Nivaldo
DM	8	Toni Varela		(substituted off) 67'
CM	15	Marco Soares
CM	5	Babanco	(yellow card) 16'
RW	10	Héldon Ramos
LW	20	Ryan Mendes		(substituted off) 51'
CF	11	Julio Tavares		(substituted off) 80'
Substitutions:
FW	7	Platini		(substituted on) 51'
FW	21	Djaniny		(substituted on) 67'
FW	9	Rambé	(yellow card) 87'	(substituted on) 80'
Manager:
Lúcio Antunes

Man of the Match:
Fatau Dauda (Ghana)

Assistant referees:
Yéo Songuifolo (Ivory Coast)
Jean-Claude Birumushahu (Burundi)
Fourth official:
Gehad Grisha (Egypt)

=== South Africa vs. Mali ===
2 February 2013
20:30

South Africa	1–1 (a.e.t.)	Mali
Rantie 31'	Report	Keita 58'
Penalties
Tshabalala (penalty scored); Furman (penalty missed); Mahlangu (penalty missed); Majoro (penalty missed)	1–3	(penalty scored) Diabaté; (penalty scored) Tamboura; (penalty scored) Ma. Traoré

Moses Mabhida Stadium, Durban
Attendance: 45,000
Referee: Néant Alioum (Cameroon)

South Africa	Mali

GK	16	Itumeleng Khune
RB	2	Siboniso Gaxa
CB	21	Siyabonga Sangweni
CB	14	Bongani Khumalo (c)	(yellow card) 24'
LB	3	Tsepo Masilela	(yellow card) 109'
CM	15	Dean Furman
CM	12	Reneilwe Letsholonyane
RW	18	Thuso Phala	(yellow card) 45+3'	(substituted off) 89'
AM	19	May Mahlangu
LW	17	Bernard Parker		(substituted off) 105+2'
CF	23	Tokelo Rantie	(yellow card) 39'	(substituted off) 41'
Substitutions:
FW	7	Lehlohonolo Majoro	(yellow card) 91'	(substituted on) 41'
MF	10	Thulani Serero		(substituted on) 89'
MF	8	Siphiwe Tshabalala		(substituted on) 105+2'
Manager:
Gordon Igesund

GK	16	Soumbeïla Diakité
RB	2	Fousseni Diawara
CB	13	Molla Wague
CB	4	Adama Coulibaly
LB	3	Adama Tamboura
DM	6	Mohamed Sissoko		(substituted off) 55'
CM	12	Seydou Keita (c)
CM	18	Samba Sow	(yellow card) 69'
RW	20	Samba Diakité		(substituted off) 24'
LW	10	Modibo Maïga
CF	15	Mahamadou Samassa		(substituted off) 88'
Substitutions:
MF	11	Sigamary Diarra		(substituted on) 24'
MF	17	Mahamane Traoré	(yellow card) 111'	(substituted on) 55'
FW	9	Cheick Diabaté		(substituted on) 88'
Manager:
(France) Patrice Carteron

Man of the Match:
Seydou Keita (Mali)

Assistant referees:
Evarist Menkouande (Cameroon)
Peter Edibe (Nigeria)
Fourth official:
Janny Sikazwe (Zambia)

=== Ivory Coast vs. Nigeria ===
3 February 2013
17:00

Ivory Coast	1–2	Nigeria
Tioté 50'	Report	Emenike 43'; Mba 78'

Royal Bafokeng Stadium, Rustenburg
Attendance: 25,000
Referee: Djamel Haimoudi (Algeria)

Ivory Coast	Nigeria

GK	1	Boubacar Barry
RB	21	Emmanuel Eboué
CB	5	Didier Zokora
CB	22	Sol Bamba	(yellow card) 81'
LB	17	Siaka Tiéné
CM	9	Cheick Tioté
CM	6	Romaric		(substituted off) 83'
RW	8	Salomon Kalou	(yellow card) 47'	(substituted off) 69'
AM	19	Yaya Touré	(yellow card) 39'
LW	10	Gervinho
CF	11	Didier Drogba (c)
Substitutions:
FW	15	Max Gradel		(substituted on) 69'
FW	18	Lacina Traoré		(substituted on) 83'
Manager:
(France) Sabri Lamouchi

GK	1	Vincent Enyeama (c)	(yellow card) 90'
RB	5	Efe Ambrose
CB	22	Kenneth Omeruo
CB	14	Godfrey Oboabona
LB	3	Uwa Elderson Echiéjilé
DM	17	Ogenyi Onazi	(yellow card) 28'
CM	19	Sunday Mba
CM	10	Mikel John Obi
RW	9	Emmanuel Emenike
LW	11	Victor Moses		(substituted off) 90'
CF	8	Brown Ideye
Substitutions:
DF	2	Joseph Yobo		(substituted on) 90'
Manager:
Stephen Keshi

Man of the Match:
Sunday Mba (Nigeria)

Assistant referees:
Redouane Achik (Morocco)
Jerson Emiliano Dos Santos (Angola)
Fourth official:
Bouchaïb El Ahrach (Morocco)

=== Burkina Faso vs. Togo ===
3 February 2013
20:30

Burkina Faso	1–0 (a.e.t.)	Togo
Pitroipa 105'	Report

Mbombela Stadium, Nelspruit
Attendance: 27,000
Referee: Badara Diatta (Senegal)

Burkina Faso	Togo

GK	1	Daouda Diakité
RB	5	Mohamed Koffi
CB	4	Bakary Koné
CB	8	Paul Koulibaly
LB	12	Saïdou Panandétiguiri
CM	6	Djakaridja Koné
CM	18	Charles Kaboré	(yellow card) 43'
RW	20	Wilfried Sanou		(substituted off) 96'
AM	11	Jonathan Pitroipa		(substituted off) 108'
LW	13	Issouf Ouattara	(yellow card) 40'	(substituted off) 66'
CF	9	Moumouni Dagano (c)
Substitutions:
FW	22	Prejuce Nakoulma		(substituted on) 66'
MF	21	Abdou Razack Traoré		(substituted on) 96'
MF	7	Florent Rouamba		(substituted on) 108'
Manager:
(Belgium) Paul Put

GK	16	Kossi Agassa
RB	21	Djené
CB	5	Serge Akakpo		(substituted off) 106'
CB	9	Vincent Bossou	(yellow card) 120+3'
LB	2	Daré Nibombé
RM	6	Abdoul-Gafar Mamah	(yellow card) 40'
CM	15	Alaixys Romao	(yellow card) 92'
CM	8	Komlan Amewou		(substituted off) 116'
LM	10	Floyd Ayité	(yellow card) 20'	(substituted off) 67'
SS	17	Serge Gakpé	(yellow card) 34'
CF	4	Emmanuel Adebayor (c)	(yellow card) 112'
Substitutions:
MF	14	Prince Segbefia		(substituted on) 67'
MF	3	Dové Womé		(substituted on) 106'
MF	7	Moustapha Salifou		(substituted on) 116'
Manager:
(France) Didier Six

Man of the Match:
Jonathan Pitroipa (Burkina Faso)

Assistant referees:
Djibril Camara (Senegal)
El Hadji Malick Samba (Senegal)
Fourth official:
Bernard Camille (Seychelles)

== Semi-finals ==
=== Mali vs. Nigeria ===
6 February 2013
17:00

Mali	1–4	Nigeria
C. Diarra 75'	Report	Echiéjilé 25'; Ideye 30'; Emenike 44'; Musa 60'

Moses Mabhida Stadium, Durban
Attendance: 54,000
Referee: Bakary Gassama (Gambia)

Mali	Nigeria

GK	1	Mamadou Samassa
RB	2	Fousseni Diawara	(yellow card) 84'
CB	13	Molla Wague
CB	21	Mahamadou N'Diaye
LB	3	Adama Tamboura
DM	8	Mohamed Kalilou Traoré
CM	12	Seydou Keita (c)
CM	6	Mohamed Sissoko		(substituted off) 56'
RW	10	Modibo Maïga	(yellow card) 38'	(substituted off) 46'
LW	17	Mahamane Traoré		(substituted off) 67'
CF	15	Mahamadou Samassa
Substitutions:
FW	7	Cheick Fantamady Diarra		(substituted on) 46'
FW	9	Cheick Diabaté		(substituted on) 56'
MF	18	Samba Sow	(yellow card) 69'	(substituted on) 67'
Manager:
(France) Patrice Carteron

GK	1	Vincent Enyeama (c)
RB	5	Efe Ambrose	(yellow card) 26'	(substituted off) 81'
CB	22	Kenneth Omeruo
CB	14	Godfrey Oboabona
LB	3	Uwa Elderson Echiéjilé
DM	10	Mikel John Obi
CM	19	Sunday Mba
CM	17	Ogenyi Onazi
RW	9	Emmanuel Emenike
LW	11	Victor Moses		(substituted off) 53'
CF	8	Brown Ideye		(substituted off) 72'
Substitutions:
FW	7	Ahmed Musa		(substituted on) 53'
MF	18	Ejike Uzoenyi		(substituted on) 72'
DF	2	Joseph Yobo		(substituted on) 81'
Manager:
Stephen Keshi

Man of the Match:
Emmanuel Emenike (Nigeria)

Assistant referees:
Angesom Ogbamariam (Eritrea)
Félicien Kabanda (Rwanda)
Fourth official:
Gehad Grisha (Egypt)

=== Burkina Faso vs. Ghana ===
6 February 2013
20:30

Burkina Faso	1–1 (a.e.t.)	Ghana
Bancé 60'	Report	Wakaso 13' (pen.)
Penalties
B. Koné (penalty scored); H. Traoré (penalty scored); Paul Koulibaly (penalty missed); Bancé (penalty scored)	3–2	(penalty missed) Vorsah; (penalty scored) Atsu; (penalty scored) Afful; (penalty missed) Clottey; (penalty missed) Agyemang-Badu

Mbombela Stadium, Nelspruit
Attendance: 35,000
Referee: Slim Jedidi (Tunisia)

Burkina Faso	Ghana

GK	1	Daouda Diakité
RB	5	Mohamed Koffi		(substituted off) 90+2'
CB	4	Bakary Koné
CB	8	Paul Koulibaly	(yellow card) 77'
LB	12	Saïdou Panandétiguiri
CM	6	Djakaridja Koné
CM	7	Florent Rouamba
RW	22	Prejuce Nakoulma
AM	18	Charles Kaboré (c)
LW	11	Jonathan Pitroipa	(yellow card) 67' (yellow-red card) 117'
CF	15	Aristide Bancé
Substitutions:
DF	3	Henri Traoré		(substituted on) 90+2'
Manager:
(Belgium) Paul Put

GK	16	Fatau Dauda
RB	4	John Paintsil		(substituted off) 10'
CB	21	John Boye
CB	15	Isaac Vorsah
LB	23	Harrison Afful
DM	11	Mohammed Rabiu	(yellow card) 21'	(substituted off) 47'
CM	8	Emmanuel Agyemang-Badu
RW	7	Christian Atsu
AM	22	Mubarak Wakaso		(substituted off) 104'
LW	20	Kwadwo Asamoah
CF	3	Asamoah Gyan (c)
Substitutions:
MF	14	Solomon Asante		(substituted on) 10'
MF	9	Derek Boateng	(yellow card) 71'	(substituted on) 47'
FW	17	Emmanuel Clottey		(substituted on) 104'
Manager:
James Kwesi Appiah

Man of the Match:
Aristide Bancé (Burkina Faso)

Assistant referees:
Béchir Hassani (Tunisia)
Anouar Hmila (Tunisia)
Fourth official:
Bouchaib El Ahrach (Morocco)

== Third place play-off ==
9 February 2013
20:00

Mali	3–1	Ghana
Mah. Samassa 21'; Keita 48'; S. Diarra 90+4'	Report	Asamoah 82'

Nelson Mandela Bay Stadium, Port Elizabeth
Attendance: 6,000
Referee: Eric Otogo-Castane (Gabon)

Mali	Ghana

GK	16	Soumbeïla Diakité
RB	2	Fousseni Diawara
CB	4	Adama Coulibaly
CB	19	Salif Coulibaly
LB	3	Adama Tamboura	(yellow card) 46'
DM	8	Mohamed Kalilou Traoré
CM	17	Mahamane Traoré
RW	23	Ousmane Coulibaly
AM	12	Seydou Keita (c)
LW	15	Mahamadou Samassa		(substituted off) 78'
CF	9	Cheick Diabaté
Substitutions:
MF	11	Sigamary Diarra		(substituted on) 78'
Manager:
(France) Patrice Carteron

GK	16	Fatau Dauda
RB	23	Harrison Afful
CB	21	John Boye		(substituted off) 46'
CB	15	Isaac Vorsah	(yellow card) 33'
LB	2	Richard Boateng
DM	5	Mohamed Awal
CM	20	Kwadwo Asamoah
AM	7	Christian Atsu		(substituted off) 70'
RW	14	Solomon Asante	(yellow card) 90+1'
LW	22	Mubarak Wakaso	(yellow card) 25'
CF	3	Asamoah Gyan (c)		(substituted off) 75'
Substitutions:
DF	19	Jonathan Mensah		(substituted on) 46'
MF	10	Albert Adomah		(substituted on) 70'
FW	17	Emmanuel Clottey		(substituted on) 75'
Manager:
James Kwesi Appiah

Man of the Match:
Seydou Keita (Mali)

Assistant referees:
Evarist Menkouande (Cameroon)
Marwa Range (Kenya)
Fourth official:
Janny Sikazwe (Zambia)

== Final ==
10 February 2013
20:30

Nigeria	1–0	Burkina Faso
Mba 40'	Report

FNB Stadium, Johannesburg
Attendance: 85,000
Referee: Djamel Haimoudi (Algeria)

Nigeria	Burkina Faso

GK	1	Vincent Enyeama (c)
RB	5	Efe Ambrose
CB	22	Kenneth Omeruo	(yellow card) 57'
CB	14	Godfrey Oboabona
LB	3	Uwa Elderson Echiéjilé		(substituted off) 67'
CM	17	Ogenyi Onazi	(yellow card) 38'
CM	10	Mikel John Obi	(yellow card) 57'
RW	11	Victor Moses
AM	19	Sunday Mba		(substituted off) 89'
LW	8	Brown Ideye	(yellow card) 90+2'
CF	15	Ikechukwu Uche		(substituted off) 54'
Substitutions:
FW	7	Ahmed Musa		(substituted on) 54'
DF	21	Juwon Oshaniwa	(yellow card) 71'	(substituted on) 67'
DF	2	Joseph Yobo		(substituted on) 89'
Manager:
Stephen Keshi

GK	1	Daouda Diakité
RB	5	Mohamed Koffi
CB	4	Bakary Koné
CB	8	Paul Koulibaly		(substituted off) 84'
LB	12	Saïdou Panandétiguiri
CM	6	Djakaridja Koné		(substituted off) 90'
CM	7	Florent Rouamba	(yellow card) 33'	(substituted off) 65'
RW	22	Prejuce Nakoulma
AM	18	Charles Kaboré (c)
LW	11	Jonathan Pitroipa
CF	15	Aristide Bancé
Substitutions:
MF	20	Wilfried Sanou		(substituted on) 65'
FW	9	Moumouni Dagano		(substituted on) 84'
MF	21	Abdou Razack Traoré		(substituted on) 90'
Manager:
(Belgium) Paul Put

Man of the Match:
Mikel John Obi (Nigeria)

Assistant referees:
Redouane Achik (Morocco)
Jean-Claude Birumushahu (Burundi)
Fourth official:
Rajindraparsad Seechurn (Mauritius)
