= 2009–10 FC Dinamo București season =

FC Dinamo București
2009–10 season
- Chairman: Nicolae Badea
- Manager: Dario Bonetti (rounds 1–8), Marin Ion (rounds 9–10), Cornel Ţălnar
- Liga I: 6th
- Romanian Cup: Semifinals
- UEFA Europa League: Group stage
- Top goalscorer: League: Andrei Cristea (16); All: Andrei Cristea (20)
- Highest home attendance: 15,000 (vs Steaua, 17 March 2010)
- Lowest home attendance: 800 (vs Pandurii, 4 October 2009)
- Average home league attendance: 3,324

The 2009–10 season of Dinamo București's 61st consecutive season in Liga I. In this season, Dinamo competed in Liga I, Cupa României and UEFA Europa League.

Dinamo played in the playoff for Europa League against Czech football club FC Slovan Liberec. In the first leg the supporters invaded the pitch causing the match to be abandoned in the 88th minute when the score was 2–0 for Slovan. The UEFA Control and Disciplinary Body awarded a default 0–3 defeat against Dinamo. One week later in Liberec Dinamo managed a memorable comeback and qualified in the Europa League 2009-10 Group Stage after winning 3–0 in Liberec after 90 and 120 minutes and winning 9–8 at penalties after 10 series. Andrei Cristea scored once and Marius Niculae twice. Dinamo was drawn in group F along Panathinaikos Athens, Galatasaray Istanbul and Sturm Graz. The first game was played against the Austrian team in Graz on 17 September and won 1–0 by the Red Dogs, but they eventually only won another game in the group, finishing 3rd in the group with two wins and four defeats. Dinamo finished the season 6th in Romania and qualified for the Europa League and were eliminated in the Cup semifinals. The season was another unsuccessful one despite defeating again rivals Steaua Bucharest twice and being most of the championship close to the leading position of the table.

== Staff ==
Position	Staff
Manager	(Romania) Cornel Ţălnar
Assistant manager	(Romania) Ionel Ganea
Fitness Coach	(Romania) Constantin Niculae
Goalkeeping Coach	(Italy) Claudio Bozzini

Last updated: 7 January 2010

== Transfers ==
=== In ===
No.	Pos.	Nat.	Name	Age	EU	Moving from	Type	Transfer window	Ends	Transfer fee	Source
17	FW	(Romania)	An.Cristea	25	EU	Politehnica Iași (Romania)	Loan return	Summer	?	—	
	CB	(North Macedonia)	Todorovski	24	Non-EU	Renova (North Macedonia)	Loan return	Summer	?	—	
	CB	(Serbia)	Pekarić	26	Non-EU	Red Star Belgrade (Serbia)	Loan return	Summer	?	—	
6	DM	(Romania)	Rus	24	EU	Liberty Salonta (Romania)	Transfer	Summer	?	?	
5	DM	(Ivory Coast)	Koné	22	Non-EU	Hapoel Petah Tikva (Israel)	Transfer	Summer	?	Free	
34	GK	(Romania)	Curcă	28	EU	Farul Constanța (Romania)	Loan	Summer	?	—	
14	RB	(Spain)	Molinero	23	EU	Levante	Transfer	Summer	?	Free	
	DM	(Romania)	Mărgăritescu	30	EU		Transfer	Winter	?	Free	
	CB	(Romania)	Daminuţă	19	EU	Internazionale (Italy)	Loan	Winter	?	Free	
	CB	(Czech Republic)	Živný	28	EU		Transfer	Winter	?	Free	

=== Out ===
No.	Pos.	Nat.	Name	Age	EU	Moving to	Type	Transfer window	Transfer fee	Source
	CM	(Senegal)	Malick		Non-EU		End of contract	Summer	—	
	RB	(Ghana)	Blay		Non-EU		End of contract	Summer	—	
	GK	(Latvia)	Kolinko		Non-EU		End of contract	Summer	—	
	LB	(Portugal)	Bruno Simao		EU		End of contract	Summer	—	
	CB	(Romania)	Izvoranu	26	EU	Astra Ploiești	Transfer	Summer	€0.4M	
	LM	(Romania)	Mitea	24	EU		Released	Summer	—	
	LM	(North Macedonia)	Todorovski	24	Non-EU	Renova (North Macedonia)	Loaned	Summer	—	
	FW	(Romania)	Ganea	21	EU	Astra Ploiești	Loaned	Summer	—	
	FW	(Romania)	Dănciulescu	32	EU	Hércules (Spain)	Transfer	Summer	€0.3M	
	GK	(Romania)	Lobonţ	31	EU	Roma (Italy)	Loaned	Summer	—	
	RB	(Romania)	Homei	22	EU	Gloria Bistrița	Loaned	Summer	—	
	FW	(Argentina)	Miranda	25	Non-EU	Astra Ploiești	Loaned	Summer	—	
	CB	(Romania)	Tamaş	26	EU	West Brom (England)	Transfer	Winter	€0.4M	
	FW	(Argentina)	Miranda	25	Non-EU	Belgrano (Argentina)	Loaned	Winter	—	
	RW	(Angola)	Zé Kalanga	26	Non-EU	Libolo (Angola)	Transfer	Winter	€0.5M	
	GK	(Romania)	Matache	27	EU	Universitatea Cluj	Transfer	Winter	?	
	RB	(Romania)	Păun	24	EU	Politehnica Iași	Loaned	Winter	—	

Last updated: 1 February 2010

== Squad stats ==
Goalkeepers	Liga 1 Ap	Liga 1 Min	Europa League Ap	Europa League Min	Romanian Cup Ap	Romanian Cup Min
1. Munteanu	5	450	0	0	1	90
12. Dolha	22	1960	7	628	1	90
Matache	0	0	1	120	1	90
36. Curcă	8	650	0	0	2	180

Outfield players

Player	Pos	Liga 1 Ap	Liga 1 Min	Liga 1 G	Europa League Ap	Europa League Min	Europa League G	Romanian Cup Ap	Romanian Cup Min	Romanian Cup G
2. Diabate	DF	8	432	0	6	570	0	3	192	0
3. Pulhac	DF	29	2512	0	2	178	0	4	258	0
4. Moţi	DF	24	2013	1	4	390	0	4	290	0
5. Koné	MF	21	1403	0	6	481	0	2	134	0
6. Rus	MF	20	1187	0	5	184	0	3	270	0
7. Zicu	MF	18	612	0	5	251	0	3	152	1
8. Boştină	MF	27	1819	2	6	360	0	5	360	0
9. Niculae	FW	20	1539	3	4	336	4	1	77	0
10. Alexe	FW	25	1539	5	5	374	0	2	111	0
10. Dănciulescu	FW	4	221	2	2	90	0	0	0	0
14. Molinero	DF	16	1386	0	3	300	0	5	398	0
15. Bratu	FW	6	156	1	0	0	0	1	70	0
16. Ştefan	MF	1	3	0	0	0	0	0	0	0
17. An.Cristea	FW	29	2409	16	7	540	1	2	180	3
18. Goian	DF	13	1125	0	4	276	0	3	212	0
19. Daminuta	DF	2	41	0	0	0	0	0	0	0
20. Ad.Cristea	MF	28	1618	3	8	605	0	4	213	0
21. Grigore	DF	12	814	0	2	208	0	1	90	0
22. Torje	MF	29	2408	3	8	597	0	3	225	0
24. Vranjković	MF	1	17	0	0	0	0	0	0	0
25. Scarlatache	DF	27	2357	1	5	448	0	2	180	0
26. Mărgăritescu	MF	6	385	0	0	0	0	0	0	0
27. Zé Kalanga	MF	2	26	0	1	10	0	2	135	1
28. Stănescu	MF	1	15	0	0	0	0	0	0	0
29. N'Doye	MF	27	2206	2	5	426	1	4	272	0
30. Živný	DF	1	90	0	0	0	0	0	0	0
33. Tamaş	DF	12	989	2	7	628	1	2	114	0
99. Niculescu	FW	24	1115	3	8	197	0	5	349	2
Predescu	MF	0	0	0	0	0	0	1	90	1
Acsinte	DF	0	0	0	0	0	0	1	45	0
Dragalina	MF	0	0	0	0	0	0	1	45	0
Bădăuţă	MF	0	0	0	0	0	0	1	26	0

=== Disciplinary record ===
Player	Pos	L1 (yellow card) YC	L1 (red card) RC	LE (yellow card) YC	LE (red card) RC	CR (yellow card) YC	CR (red card) RC
Munteanu	GK	1	0	0	0	0	0
Diabate	DF	1	0	2	0	0	0
Pulhac	DF	8	1	1	0	0	0
Moţi	DF	10	1	2	0	0	1
Koné	MF	3	0	0	0	0	1
Rus	MF	3	0	2	1	0	0
Zicu	MF	1	0	2	0	0	0
Boştină	MF	3	0	0	0	0	0
Niculae	FW	4	0	1	0	0	0
Alexe	FW	3	0	0	0	0	0
Dănciulescu	FW	0	0	0	0	0	0
Dolha	GK	1	0	0	0	0	0
Molinero	DF	5	0	1	0	2	0
Bratu	FW	0	0	0	0	0	0
An.Cristea	FW	7	1	1	0	1	0
Goian	DF	4	0	2	0	0	0
Daminuta	DF	0	0	0	0	0	0
Ad.Cristea	MF	1	0	1	0	0	0
Torje	MF	10	0	0	0	0	0
Vranjković	MF	0	0	0	0	0	0
Matache	GK	0	0	0	0	0	0
Scarlatache	DF	5	1	0	0	0	0
Mărgăritescu	MF	1	0	0	0	0	0
Grigore	DF	2	1	0	0	0	0
Zé Kalanga	MF	0	0	0	0	0	0
N'Doye	MF	4	0	5	1	1	0
Živný	DF	1	0	0	0	0	0
Tamaş	DF	5	1	1	0	1	0
Curcă	GK	1	0	0	0	0	0
Niculescu	FW	3	0	0	0	1	0

== Results ==
Liga 1
Round	Date/Hour	Opponent	Stadium	Score	Scorers (minute)	Referee	Attendance	Report
I	01.08/21:30	U Craiova	A	0–0		Tudor	18,000	
II	07.08/20:00	Inter Argeș	H	0–1		Crăciunescu	0	
III	15.08/21:00	Ceahlăul	A	4–0	Dănciulescu (5, 77), Ad.Cristea (23), Torje (49)	Deaconu	12,000	
IV	23.08/20:30	CFR Cluj	H	1–0	Niculae (80)	Haţegan	2,000	
V	30.08/21:00	Steaua	A	1–0	Tamaş (23)	Bergonzi	18,600	
VI	12.09/19:00	Oţelul	H	0–1		Drăgănescu	3,000	
VII	20.09/20:00	Urziceni	H	2–1	An.Cristea (49), Torje (90)	Lutz	6,000	
VIII	26.09/16:00	Gaz Metan	A	0–1		Kovacs	1,500	
IX	04.10/20:00	Pandurii	H	1–1	Tamaş (8-pen.)	Ionescu	800	
X	18.10/18:00	FC Brașov	A	1–0	An.Cristea (26)	Balaj	8,000	
XI	25.10/18:00	Bistriţa	H	1–1	An.Cristea (36)	Danşa	1,300	
XII	01.11/20:00	Poli Iaşi	A	3–1	An.Cristea (20, 63), Ad.Cristea (58)	Deaconu	6,000	
XIII	08.11/20:00	Rapid	H	1–1	Niculescu (88)	Haţegan	8,000	
XIV	23.11/20:45	Timișoara	A	0–2		Mazic	20,000	
XV	28.11/18:00	Alba Iulia	H	2–0	Niculescu (3), Niculae (82)	Drăgănescu	1,000	
XVI	08.12/20:00	Astra	A	1–1	Niculescu (55)	Colţescu	4,000	
XVII	13.12/20:00	Vaslui	H	1–1	N'Doye (55)	Gomes	1,500	
XVIII	21.02/19:30	U Craiova	H	2–1	Boştină (8), Niculae (16)	Constantin	7,300	
XIX	27.02/19:00	Inter Argeș	A	3–1	An.Cristea (57, 74), Alexe (67)	Balaj	9,000	
XX	06.03/18:30	Ceahlăul	H	1–1	Viţelaru (15/owngoal)	Ionescu	2,000	
XXI	13.03/20:00	CFR Cluj	A	2–2	Cristea (33), Boştină (54)	Haţegan	20,000	
XXII	17.03/20:30	Steaua	H	2–0	Alexe (39), Cristea (82)	Tudor	15,000	
XXIII	21.03/15:30	Oţelul	A	3–2	Moţi (5), Alexe (20), An.Cristea (55)	Balaj	11,000	
XXIV	28.03/20:00	Urziceni	A	4–4	Fernandes (6-o.g.) An.Cristea (8, 64), Torje (48)	Avram	2,000	
XXV	02.04/20:30	Gaz Metan	H	1–0	Alexe (58)	Berbecaru	3,000	
XXVI	08.04/20:30	Pandurii	A	0–0		Kovacs	7,000	
XXVII	11.04/19:30	FC Brașov	H	0–0		Ionescu	3,000	
XXVIII	17.04/19:30	Bistriţa	A	2–3	Niculescu (12), An.Cristea (32)	Colţescu	5,000	
XXIX	23.04/20:30	Poli Iaşi	H	1–1	N'Doye (21)	Dumitru	2.000	
XXX	02.05/20:30	Rapid	A	2–2	An. Cristea (11), Alexe (24)	Haţegan	9,000	
XXXI	06.05/21:15	FC Timișoara	H	1–2	Niculae (64)	Deaconu	4,000	
XXXII	10.05/14:00	Alba Iulia	A	2–1	An.Cristea (45, 69)	Drăgănescu	5,000	
XXXIII	16.05/18:00	Astra	H	3–3	Scarlatache (9), Bratu (12), Ad.Cristea (80)	Comănescu	1,000	
XXXIV	22.05/17:00	FC Vaslui	A	0–2		Ivan	5,000	

Cupa României
Round	Hour	Opponent	Stadium	Score	Scorers	Referee	Attendance	Report
Round of 32	24.09/20:00	FC Zlatna	H	5–0	Predescu (5), Niculescu (28), Zé Kalanga (30), Zicu (39), Kiraly (62 o.g.)	Unimătan	1,000	
Round of 16	29.10/20:15	Oţelul	H	1–0	Niculescu (75)	Drăgănescu	1,000	
Quarterfinales	19.11/20:15	Astra	A	2–1	An.Cristea (9, 54)	Balaj	4,500	
Semifinals 1st leg	23.03/20:15	CFR Cluj	H	1–1	Goian (10)	Haţegan	8,000	
Semifinals 2nd leg	14.04/20:15	CFR Cluj	A	1–2	An.Cristea (73)	Tudor	12,880	

=== Europe ===
Play-off Europa League

20 August 2009
19:30

Dinamo București (Romania)	0–3 Awarded	(Czech Republic) Slovan Liberec
	Report	Liška 6'; Blažek 84'

Stadionul Dinamo, Bucharest
Attendance: 11,000
Referee: Thomas Einwaller (Austria)

27 August 2009
19:30

Slovan Liberec (Czech Republic)	0–3 (a.e.t.)	(Romania) Dinamo București
	Report	Andrei Cristea 2'; Niculae 57', 81'
Penalties
Papoušek (penalty scored); Blažek (penalty scored); Vácha (penalty scored); Gecov (penalty missed); Holeňák (penalty scored); Vulin (penalty scored); Dejmek (penalty scored); Dočkal (penalty scored); Gebre Selassie (penalty scored); Liška (penalty missed)	8–9	(penalty scored) Niculae; (penalty missed) Zicu; (penalty scored) Boştină; (penalty scored) Torje; (penalty scored) Niculescu; (penalty scored) Moţi; (penalty scored) Grigore; (penalty scored) Kone; (penalty scored) Diabate; (penalty scored) Molinero

U Nisy Stadium, Liberec
Attendance: 5,490
Referee: Alon Yefet (Israel)

Dinamo București 3–3 Slovan Liberec on aggregate. Dinamo București won 9–8 on penalties.

Group F

17 September 2009
19:00

Sturm Graz (Austria)	0–1	(Romania) Dinamo București
	Report	Tamaş 80'

UPC-Arena, Graz
Attendance: 12,500
Referee: Tony Asumaa (Finland)

1 October 2009
21:05

Dinamo București (Romania)	0–1	(Greece) Panathinaikos
	Report	Karagounis 79'

Stadionul Dinamo, Bucharest
Attendance: 0
Referee: César Muñiz Fernández (Spain)

22 October 2009
21:05

Galatasaray (Turkey)	4–1	(Romania) Dinamo București
Kewell 32'; Nonda 42', 46'; Elano 58' (pen.)	Report	Boştină 61'

Ali Sami Yen Stadium, Istanbul
Attendance: 22,000
Referee: Martin Ingvarsson (Sweden)

5 November 2009
19:00

Dinamo București (Romania)	0–3	(Turkey) Galatasaray
	Report	Kewell 22'; Nonda 24'; Mehmet 56'

Stadionul Dinamo, Bucharest
Attendance: 0
Referee: Michael Weiner (Germany)

3 December 2009
21:05

Dinamo București (Romania)	2–1	(Austria) Sturm Graz
Niculae 41', 57'	Report	Sonnleitner 5'

Stadionul Dinamo, Bucharest
Attendance: 3,000
Referee: Bruno Miguel Duarte Paixão (Portugal)

16 December 2009
19:00

Panathinaikos (Greece)	3–0	(Romania) Dinamo București
Rukavina 54'; Cissé 80', 85'	Report

Olympic Stadium, Athens
Attendance: 19,617
Referee: Kevin Blom (Netherlands)

Team	Pld	W	D	L	GF	GA	GD	Pts
(Turkey) Galatasaray	6	4	1	1	12	4	+8	13
(Greece) Panathinaikos	6	4	0	2	7	4	+3	12
(Romania) Dinamo București	6	2	0	4	4	12	−8	6
(Austria) Sturm Graz	6	1	1	4	3	6	−3	4

	DB	GAL	PAN	STM
Dinamo București	–	0–3	0–1	2–1
Galatasaray	4–1	–	1–0	1–1
Panathinaikos	3–0	1–3	–	1–0
Sturm Graz	0–1	1–0	0–1	–

=== Non competitive matches ===
Game	Date	Tournament	Round	Ground	Opponent	Score^{1}	Report
1	4 July	Friendly	—	N	Astra Ploiești (Romania)	2–4	Kick off / 10:00 EET; Dinamo București / Astra Ploiești; 25' Zicu; 65' (pen.) Dănciulescu / 31', 56', 70' Ciobanu; 35' Al. Stan
2	8 July	Friendly	—	N	Nantes (France)	2–0	Kick off / 20:00 EET; Dinamo București / Nantes; 8' Niculae; 60' Dănciulescu
3	10 July	Friendly	—	N	Marseille (France)	1–2	Kick off / 21:00 EET; Dinamo București / Marseille; 45' Dănciulescu / Ben Arfa; Niang
4	12 July	Friendly	—	N	Aix-Les-Bains Savoie (France)	1–2	Kick off / 20:30 EET; Dinamo București / Aix-Les-Bains Savoie; 10' An.Cristea
5	14 July	Friendly	—	N	Croix de Savoie (France)	1–1	Kick off / 19:30 EET; Dinamo București / Croix de Savoie; 37' Torje
6	18 July	Friendly	—	N	Saint-Étienne (France)	0–2	Kick off / 20:00 EET
7	23 July	Friendly	—	N	Porto (Portugal)	0–1	Kick off / 23:00 EET
8	30 January	Friendly	—	N	LASK Linz (Austria)	2–0	Kick off / 15:00 EET; Dinamo București / LASK Linz; 66' L.Ganea; 76' Păun
9	31 January	Friendly	—	N	Gençlerbirliği (Turkey)	1–1	Kick off / 15:00 EET; Dinamo București / Gençlerbirliği; 87' (pen.) An.Cristea / 73' (pen.) Kahê
10	2 February	Friendly	—	N	Slaven Belupo (Croatia)	0–1	Kick off / 15:00 EET; Dinamo București / Slaven Belupo; / 48' Posavec
11	4 February	Friendly	—	N	Chernomorets Burgas (Bulgaria)	2–0	Kick off / 15:00 EET; Dinamo București / Chernomorets Burgas; 60' An.Cristea; 71' Koné
12	6 February	Friendly	—	N	Hoverla Uzhhorod (Ukraine)	2–0	Kick off / 15:00 EET; Dinamo București / Hoverla Uzhhorod; 42' Niculae; 52' Ganea
13	7 February	Friendly	—	N	North Korea	2–1	Kick off / 15:00 EET; Dinamo București / North Korea; 13' (pen.) Niculescu; 90' Molinero
14	9 February	Friendly	—	N	Universitatea Cluj (Romania)	2–1	Kick off / 15:00 EET; Dinamo București / Universitatea Cluj; 70', 80' Zicu / 30' (pen.) Huvos
15	10 February	Friendly	—	N	Arka Gdynia (Poland)	0–2	Kick off / 15:00 EET; Dinamo București / Arka Gdynia; / 6' Budziński; 59' (o.g.) Koné

Last updated: 10 February 2010
Source: www.fcdinamo.ro
^{1}Dinamo goals come first.
National flags for Ground and Opponent columns are only shown when different from that of Dinamo.
M = Match; Ground: H = Home, A = Away, N = Neutral, HR = Home replacement, AR = Away replacement.
