= 2007 Toulon Tournament squads =

The following is a list of the squads which competed in the 2007 Toulon Tournament

Players in boldface have been capped at full international level at some point in their career.

== Group A ==
=== Côte d'Ivoire (Ivory Coast) ===
Coach: (France) Michel Troin

No.	Pos.	Player	Date of birth (age)	Caps	Club
1	GK	Jean-Yves André Andy	8 December 1988 (aged 18)		(Ivory Coast) Stade d'Abidjan
2	MF	Hamed Abdoulaye Konaté	7 June 1990 (aged 16)		(Ivory Coast) Athlétic Adjamé
3	MF	Gustave Gnago	15 April 1988 (aged 19)		(Ivory Coast) Stella Club
4	DF	Lassine Karamoko	14 July 1988 (aged 18)		(Ivory Coast) Lakota FC
5	DF	Yann Valentin Tchiakpe	24 August 1988 (aged 18)		(Ivory Coast) EF Yéo Martial
6	MF	Siaka Dagno	1 November 1987 (aged 19)		(Ivory Coast) Séwé Sport
7	MF	Yao Roméo Kouassi	9 March 1987 (aged 20)		(Ivory Coast) USC Bassam
8	MF	Pacôme Kouadio Kouassi	25 December 1988 (aged 18)		(Ivory Coast) ASEC Mimosas
9	FW	Hamed Sekou Bamba	1 January 1986 (aged 21)		(Ivory Coast) Athlétic Adjamé
10	FW	Alain Jacques Tanoh	16 September 1987 (aged 19)		(Ivory Coast) Stella Club
11	FW	Josué Alex Aguié	14 June 1987 (aged 19)		(Ivory Coast) Athlétic Adjamé
12	FW	Ousmane Touré	26 May 1987 (aged 20)		(Ivory Coast) EF Yéo Martial
13	DF	Zié Diabaté	2 March 1989 (aged 18)		(Ivory Coast) IF Ehouman Richard
14	MF	Anoh Attoukora	20 June 1989 (aged 17)		(Ivory Coast) Stella Club
15	MF	**Thierry Doubai**	1 July 1987 (aged 19)		(Ivory Coast) Athlétic Adjamé
16	GK	**Ibrahim Koné**	5 December 1989 (aged 17)		(Ivory Coast) CF Excellence
17	MF	**Xavier Kouassi**	28 December 1989 (aged 17)		(Ivory Coast) CO Domoraud
18	DF	**Adama Traoré**	3 February 1990 (aged 17)		(Ivory Coast) EF Yéo Martial
19	DF	Ali Diakité	22 December 1987 (aged 19)		(Ivory Coast) USC Bassam
20	DF	**Mamadou Bagayoko**	31 December 1989 (aged 17)		(Ivory Coast) Africa Sports

=== France ===
Coach: (France) Philippe Bergeroo

No.	Pos.	Player	Date of birth (age)	Caps	Club
1	GK	**Benoît Costil**	2 July 1987 (aged 19)		(France) Caen
2	DF	Yassin Moutaouakil	18 July 1986 (aged 20)		(France) Châteauroux
3	DF	Thomas Mangani	29 April 1987 (aged 20)		(France) Brest
4	MF	**Ricardo Faty**	4 August 1986 (aged 20)		(Italy) Roma
5	DF	Mohamed Chakouri	21 May 1986 (aged 21)		(France) Montpellier
6	MF	**Youssouf Mulumbu**	25 January 1987 (aged 20)		(France) Paris Saint-Germain
7	DF	Romain Danzé	3 July 1986 (aged 20)		(France) Rennes
8	MF	Jonathan Lacourt	17 August 1986 (aged 20)		(France) Troyes
9	MF	**Razak Boukari**	25 April 1987 (aged 20)		(France) Lens
10	FW	**Loïc Rémy**	2 February 1987 (aged 20)		(France) Lyon
11	MF	Alexandre Bonnet	17 October 1986 (aged 20)		(France) Sedan
12	MF	Alexandre Raineau	21 June 1986 (aged 20)		(France) Caen
13	DF	Cyriaque Louvion	24 July 1987 (aged 19)		(France) Le Mans
14	DF	Sandy Paillot	27 February 1987 (aged 20)		(France) Lyon
15	FW	Xavier Pentecôte	13 August 1986 (aged 20)		(France) Toulouse
16	GK	Geoffrey Jourdren	4 February 1986 (aged 21)		(France) Montpellier
17	DF	Maxime Josse	21 March 1987 (aged 20)		(France) Brest
18	MF	**Alharbi El Jadeyaoui**	8 August 1986 (aged 20)		(France) Châteauroux
19	FW	**Kevin Gameiro**	8 May 1987 (aged 20)		(France) Strasbourg
20	FW	**Djamel Abdoun**	14 February 1986 (aged 21)		(England) Manchester City

=== Germany ===
Coach: (Germany) Dieter Eilts

No.	Pos.	Player	Date of birth (age)	Caps	Club
1	GK	Florian Fromlowitz	2 July 1986 (aged 20)		(Germany) 1. FC Kaiserslautern
2	DF	Sören Halfar	2 January 1987 (aged 20)		(Germany) Hannover 96
3	DF	Robert Fleßers	11 February 1987 (aged 20)		(Germany) Borussia Mönchengladbach
4	DF	**Andreas Beck**	13 March 1987 (aged 20)		(Germany) VfB Stuttgart
5	DF	Tom Bertram	30 March 1987 (aged 20)		(Germany) FC Rot-Weiß Erfurt
6	MF	Serkan Çalik	15 March 1986 (aged 21)		(Germany) Rot-Weiss Essen
7	MF	**Ashkan Dejagah**	5 July 1986 (aged 20)		(Germany) Hertha BSC
8	MF	**Eugen Polanski**	17 March 1986 (aged 21)		(Germany) Borussia Mönchengladbach
9	FW	Rouwen Hennings	28 August 1987 (aged 19)		(Germany) Hamburger SV
10	MF	**Kevin-Prince Boateng**	6 March 1987 (aged 20)		(Germany) Hertha BSC
11	MF	Patrick Ebert	17 March 1987 (aged 20)		(Germany) Hertha BSC
12	GK	Thorsten Kirschbaum	20 April 1987 (aged 20)		(Germany) 1899 Hoffenheim
13	DF	Pascal Bieler	26 February 1986 (aged 21)		(Germany) Hertha BSC
14	MF	Barış Özbek	14 September 1986 (aged 20)		(Germany) Rot-Weiss Essen
15	DF	**Dennis Aogo**	14 January 1987 (aged 20)		(Germany) SC Freiburg
16	DF	Daniel Schulz	21 February 1986 (aged 21)		(Germany) 1. FC Union Berlin
17	MF	Markus Steinhöfer	7 March 1986 (aged 21)		(Germany) Bayern Munich
18	MF	Dennis Grote	9 August 1986 (aged 20)		(Germany) VfL Bochum
19	DF	Kai Bülow	31 May 1986 (aged 21)		(Germany) Hansa Rostock
20	MF	Marcel Heller	12 February 1986 (aged 21)		(Germany) Eintracht Frankfurt

=== Japan ===
Coach: (Japan) Yasushi Yoshida

No.	Pos.	Player	Date of birth (age)	Caps	Club
1	GK	Yohei Takeda	30 June 1987 (aged 19)		(Japan) Shimizu S-Pulse
2	DF	**Atsuto Uchida**	27 March 1988 (aged 19)		(Japan) Kashima Antlers
3	MF	Seiya Fujita	2 June 1987 (aged 19)		(Japan) Consadole Sapporo
4	MF	Jun Aoyama	3 January 1988 (aged 19)		(Japan) Nagoya Grampus
5	FW	Kota Aoki	27 April 1987 (aged 20)		(Japan) JEF United Chiba
6	DF	**Kosuke Ota**	23 July 1987 (aged 19)		(Japan) Yokohama FC
7	FW	Yasuhito Morishima	18 September 1987 (aged 19)		(Japan) Cerezo Osaka
8	DF	**Masato Morishige**	21 May 1987 (aged 20)		(Japan) Oita Trinita
9	DF	**Michihiro Yasuda**	20 December 1987 (aged 19)		(Japan) Gamba Osaka
10	FW	**Shinji Kagawa**	17 March 1989 (aged 18)		(Japan) Cerezo Osaka
11	DF	Yohei Fukumoto	12 April 1987 (aged 20)		(Japan) Oita Trinita
12	FW	**Mike Havenaar**	20 May 1987 (aged 20)		(Japan) Yokohama F. Marinos
13	DF	Masaki Yanagawa	1 May 1987 (aged 20)		(Japan) Vissel Kobe
14	MF	**Tsukasa Umesaki**	23 February 1987 (aged 20)		(Japan) Oita Trinita
15	DF	**Tomoaki Makino**	11 May 1987 (aged 20)		(Japan) Sanfrecce Hiroshima
16	MF	**Yōsuke Kashiwagi**	15 December 1987 (aged 19)		(Japan) Sanfrecce Hiroshima
17	MF	Atomu Tanaka	4 October 1987 (aged 19)		(Japan) Albirex Niigata
18	GK	Akihiro Hayashi	7 May 1987 (aged 20)		(Japan) Ryutsu Keizai University
19	FW	Ryuichi Hirashige	15 June 1988 (aged 18)		(Japan) Sanfrecce Hiroshima
20	FW	Kazuhisa Kawahara	29 January 1987 (aged 20)		(Japan) Albirex Niigata

== Group B ==
=== China PR ===
Number	Name	Position	Club
(Serbia)	Ratomir Dujković	Coach	
1	**Zeng Cheng**	Goalkeeper	(China) Wuhan Guanggu
2	Zhao Ming	Defender	(China) Changsha Ginde
3	**Liu Yu**	Defender	(China) Dalian Shide
4	Lü Jianjun	Defender	(China) Harbin Yiteng
5	**Wan Houliang**	Defender	(China) Shaanxi Baorong
6	Wang Hongliang	Midfielder	(China) Shanghai Shenhua
7	Wang Shouting	Midfielder	(China) Henan Jianye
8	Huang Xiyang	Midfielder	(China) Chongqing Lifan
9	**Jiang Ning**	Striker	(China) Qingdao Zhongneng
10	**Chen Tao**	Midfielder	(China) Changsha Ginde
11	**Zhu Ting**	Striker	(China) Dalian Shide
12	**Yang Xu**	Striker	(China) Liaoning FC
13	Cai Xi	Defender	(China) Wuhan Guanggu
14	**Bai Yuefeng**	Defender	(China) Xiamen Lanshi
15	**Dai Lin**	Defender	(China) Liaoning FC
16	Zhang Sipeng	Goalkeeper	(China) Beijing Guoan
17	Zheng Tao	Defender	(China) Shaanxi Baorong
18	Dai Qinhua	Midfielder	(China) Changsha Ginde
19	Jiang Chen	Striker	(China) Tianjin Teda FC
20	**Yu Hai**	Midfielder	(Netherlands) Vitesse

=== Ghana ===
Number	Name	Position	Club
(Ghana)	Francis Oti Akenteng	Coach	
1	**Patrick Antwi**	Goalkeeper	(Ghana) Liberty Professionals
2	**John Boye**	Defender	(Ghana) Heart of Lions
3	**Felix Baffoe**	Striker	(Ghana) Liberty Professionals
4	Louis Quainoo	Defender	(Ghana) Tema Youth
5	Hannan Giwah	Defender	(Ghana) Real Tamale United
6	Samuel Enzemoba	Defender	(Ghana) Real Sportive
7	Solomon Addy	Defender	(Ghana) Ashanti Gold
8	**Mubarak Wakaso**	Midfielder	(Ghana) Ashanti Gold
9	**Emmanuel Clottey**	Striker	(Ghana) Great Olympics
10	**Eric Bekoe**	Striker	(Ghana) Heart of Lions
11	Alhaji Sani	Midfielder	(Ghana) Ashanti Gold
12	Douglas Nkrumah	Striker	(Ghana) Asante Kotoko
13	**Ekow Benson**	Striker	(Ghana) Tema Youth
14	Mohammed-Awal Issah	Midfielder	(Ghana) Real Sportive
15	**Yahaya Mohamed**	Midfielder	(Ghana) Tema Youth
16	Isaac Ackon	Goalkeeper	(Ghana) Gamba All Blacks
17	**Samad Oppong**	Midfielder	(Ghana) King Faisal Babes
18	Seidu Yahaya	Midfielder	(Ghana) Real Sportive
19	Yaw Frimpong	Midfielder	Feyenoord Ghana
20	Bradley Hudson-Odoi	Striker	(England) Fulham

=== Netherlands ===
Coach: (Netherlands) Hans Schrijver

No.	Pos.	Player	Date of birth (age)	Caps	Club
1	GK	Agil Etemadi	23 April 1987 (aged 20)		(Netherlands) Heerenveen
2	DF	**Gregory van der Wiel**	3 February 1988 (aged 19)		(Netherlands) Ajax
3	DF	Jeffrey Altheer	9 March 1987 (aged 20)		(Netherlands) Excelsior
4	DF	Jens Janse	1 July 1986 (aged 20)		(Netherlands) Willem II
5	DF	Lorenzo Davids	4 September 1986 (aged 20)		(Netherlands) NEC
6	MF	Kees Luyckx	11 February 1986 (aged 21)		(Netherlands) Excelsior
7	MF	**Wout Brama**	21 August 1986 (aged 20)		(Netherlands) Twente
8	MF	**Kemy Agustien**	20 August 1986 (aged 20)		(Netherlands) Roda JC
9	FW	Tim Vincken	12 September 1986 (aged 20)		(Netherlands) Feyenoord
10	MF	Jeffrey Sarpong	3 August 1988 (aged 18)		(Netherlands) Ajax
11	FW	**Jeremain Lens**	24 November 1987 (aged 19)		(Netherlands) AZ Alkmaar
12	GK	Job Bulters	22 March 1986 (aged 21)		(Netherlands) AZ Alkmaar
13	DF	Michael Timisela	5 May 1986 (aged 21)		(Netherlands) Ajax
14	DF	Milano Koenders	31 July 1986 (aged 20)		(Netherlands) RKC Waalwijk
15	DF	Robbert Maruanaya	27 January 1986 (aged 21)		(Netherlands) Heerenveen
16	MF	**Dominique Kivuvu**	16 September 1987 (aged 19)		(Netherlands) NEC
17	FW	**Eljero Elia**	13 February 1987 (aged 20)		(Netherlands) ADO Den Haag
18	FW	Marcel Kleizen	15 April 1986 (aged 21)		(Netherlands) Twente
19	FW	**Javier Martina**	1 February 1987 (aged 20)		(Netherlands) Ajax
20	MF	Niek Loohuis	25 April 1986 (aged 21)		(Netherlands) Veendam

=== Portugal ===
Coach: (Portugal) Carlos Dinis

No.	Pos.	Player	Date of birth (age)	Caps	Club
1	GK	Mário Felgueiras	12 December 1986 (aged 20)		(Portugal) Espinho
2	DF	João Pedro Silva	29 December 1987 (aged 19)		(Portugal) Portimonense
3	DF	Vasco Fernandes	12 November 1986 (aged 20)		(Portugal) Olhanense
4	DF	Mano	9 April 1987 (aged 20)		(Portugal) Belenenses
5	DF	**Gonçalo Brandão**	9 October 1986 (aged 20)		(Portugal) Belenenses
6	MF	João Coimbra	24 May 1986 (aged 21)		(Portugal) Benfica
7	FW	Bruno Gama	15 November 1987 (aged 19)		(Portugal) Braga
8	MF	Pelé	14 September 1987 (aged 19)		(Portugal) Vitória de Guimarães
9	FW	Tiago Targino	6 June 1986 (aged 20)		(Portugal) Vitória de Guimarães
10	FW	Hélder Guedes	7 May 1987 (aged 20)		(Portugal) Penafiel
11	FW	**Vieirinha**	24 January 1986 (aged 21)		(Portugal) Porto
12	GK	Bruno Costa	28 August 1987 (aged 19)		(Portugal) Odivelas
13	MF	Vítor Gomes	25 December 1987 (aged 19)		(Portugal) Rio Ave
14	DF	Pedro Correia	27 March 1987 (aged 20)		(Portugal) Benfica
15	MF	Zezinando	1 January 1987 (aged 20)		(Portugal) Estoril
16	MF	Nuno Coelho	23 November 1987 (aged 19)		(Portugal) Porto
17	FW	Carlos Saleiro	25 February 1986 (aged 21)		(Portugal) Olivais e Moscavide
18	MF	**Ivanildo Cassamá**	9 January 1986 (aged 21)		(Portugal) União de Leiria
20	MF	Celestino	2 January 1987 (aged 20)		(Portugal) Olivais e Moscavide
21	MF	Steven Pinto-Borges	26 March 1986 (aged 21)		(France) Guingamp
