= List of Ghana national football team managers =

The Ghana national football team manager was officially established in 1958 by Ohene Djan, whom the Ohene Djan Sports stadium was named after. This happened after he was elected General Secretary of the Football Association by the clubs and the Ghana Amateur Football Association was officially founded.

Ohene Djan succeeded in securing the services of English Coach, George Ainsley who officially became Ghana's first national team coach. Since 1957 until date Ghana has had 33 different head coaches and three caretakers. C. K. Gyamfi is the most successful of these, leading the Black Stars to three Africa Cup of Nations titles – in 1963, 1965 and 1982 – making Gyamfi the joint most successful coach in the competition's history.

Fred Osam Duodu led the Black Stars to their 1978 Africa Cup of Nations title; Ratomir Dujković, Milovan Rajevac, and James Kwesi Appiah, have all led the Black Stars to World Cup qualification.

== List of managers ==
This is a complete list of Ghana national football team managers, who have coached the Ghana national football team. They are listed in chronological order, along with their nationality and tenure.

As of 12 November 2026

Name	Nationality	Ghana career	Notes
George Ainsley	England	1958–1959	
Andreas Sjöberg	Sweden	1959–1962	
Josef Ember	Hungary	1963	
Charles Kumi (C.K.) Gyamfi	Ghana	1963–1965	
Carlos Alberto Parreira	Brazil	1967	
Karl Heinz Marotzke	West Germany	1968–1970	
Karl-Heinz Weigang	West Germany	1974–1975	
Oswaldo Carlos Sampaio	Brazil	1977–1978	
Fred Osam-Duodu	Ghana	1978–1981	
C.K. Gyamfi	Ghana	1982–83	
Emmanuel Kwasi Afranie	Ghana	1984	
Herbert Addo	Ghana	1984	
Rudi Gutendorf	West Germany	1986–1987	
Fred Osam-Duodu	Ghana	1988–1989	
Bukhard Ziese	Germany	1990–1992	
Otto Pfister	Germany	1993	
Fred Osam-Duodu	Ghana	1993	
Jørgen E. Larsen	Denmark	1993–1994	
Edward Aggrey-Fynn	Ghana	1994	
Petre Gavrilă	Romania	1995	
Ishmael Kurtz	Brazil	1996	
Sam Arday	Ghana	1996–1997	
Rinus Israel	Netherlands	1997–1998	
Giuseppe Dossena	Italy	1999–2000	
Fred Osam-Duodu	Ghana	2000	
Jones Attuquayefio	Ghana	2001	
Fred Osam-Duodu	Ghana	2001	
Milan Zivodinovic	FR Yugoslavia	2002	
Emmanuel Kwasi Afranie	Ghana	2002	
Bukhard Ziese	Germany	2003	
Ralf Zumdick (caretaker)	Germany	2003–2004	
Mariano Barreto	Portugal	2004	
Ratomir Dujkovic	Serbia and Montenegro	2004–2006	
Claude Le Roy	France	2006–2008	
Sellas Tetteh (caretaker)	Ghana	2008	
Milovan Rajevac	Serbia	2008–2010	
Goran Stevanovic	Serbia	2011–2012	
James Kwesi Appiah	Ghana	2012–2014	
Maxwell Konadu (caretaker)	Ghana	2014	
Avram Grant	Israel	2014–2017	
Maxwell Konadu (caretaker)	Ghana	2017	
James Kwesi Appiah	Ghana	2017–2020	
Charles K. Akonnor	Ghana	2020–2021	
Milovan Rajevac	Serbia	2021–2022	
Otto Addo (Note: Addo served as caretaker manager from February 2022 until, he was hired on a permanent short term basis until December 2022.)	Ghana	2022	
Chris Hughton	Republic of Ireland	2023–2024	
Otto Addo	Ghana	2024–2026	
Carlos Queiroz	Mozambique; Portugal	2026	
Kim Björkegren (caretaker)	Sweden	2026	

== See also ==
- Ghana national football team
- Ghana Football Association
- Charles Kumi Gyamfi
