= 2008–09 FC Dinamo București season =

FC Dinamo București
2008–09 season
- Chairman: Nicolae Badea
- Head coach: Mircea Rednic
- Liga I: 3rd
- Cupa României: Semifinals
- UEFA Cup: First round
- Top goalscorer: Ionel Dănciulescu, Marius Niculae (12)

The 2008–09 season was Dinamo București's 60th consecutive season in Liga I. In this season, Dinamo competed in Liga I, Cupa României and UEFA Cup.

In the summer of 2008, Mircea Rednic returned as coach having the mission to win the title and qualify Dinamo to the UEFA Champions League group stage. The first half of the season found Dinamo playing some modest games against the other title contenders like Rapid Bucharest, CFR Cluj or Unirea Urziceni but in the same time they managed to beat direct rivals for the title, FC Timişoara 3–0 away. Dinamo ended the first half of the season in first place after Unirea Urziceni lost the last game against Steaua Bucharest.

The second half of the season started in a promising way for the Red Dogs. Dinamo managed to beat Rapid with 3–0 at home even though Rapid was considered to be in top form and later eliminated them from the Cup with a similar 4–2 victory in Piteşti. The last three games of the season were against Unirea Urziceni away, FC Brașov home and FC Argeş away and were 3 defeats in a row, sending the club in third position.

== Transfers ==
=== In ===
No.	Pos.	Nat.	Name	Age	EU	Moving from	Type	Transfer window	Ends	Transfer fee	Source
	GK	(Romania)	Dolha	28	EU	Lech Poznań (Poland)	Transfer	Summer	?	?	
	GK	(Romania)	Matache	25	EU	Otopeni	Loan return	Summer	?	—	
	CB	(Brazil)	Júlio César	29	Non-EU	Olympiacos (Greece)	Transfer	Summer	?	?	
	CB	(Romania)	Tamaş	24	EU	Auxerre (France)	Transfer	Summer	?	?	
	RB	(Romania)	Homei	20	EU	Politehnica Iași	Loan return	Summer	?	Free	
	LM	(Venezuela)	Campos	27	Non-EU	Caracas (Venezuela)	Transfer	Summer	?	—	
	DM	(Mali)	Diakité	27	Non-EU	Boavista (Portugal)	Transfer	Summer	?	—	
	RM	(Angola)	Zé Kalanga	24	Non-EU	Boavista (Portugal)	Loan return	Summer	?	—	
	FW	(Romania)	Cristea	24	EU	Politehnica Timișoara	Transfer	Summer	?	?	
	LM	(Brazil)	Thiago	23	Non-EU	Sheriff Tiraspol (Moldova)	Transfer	Summer	?	?	
	FW	(Romania)	Niculae	27	EU	Inverness Caledonian Thistle (Scotland)	Transfer	Summer	?	?	
	LM	(Romania)	Mitea	23	EU	Ajax (Netherlands)	Transfer	Summer	?	?	
	LB	(Brazil)	Bruno Simão	23	Non-EU	UTA Arad	Transfer	Winter	?	?	
	CB	(Romania)	Moţi	24	EU	Siena (Italy)	Loan return	Winter	?	?	
	DM	(Senegal)	Papa Malick Ba	28	Non-EU	Basel (Switzerland)	Transfer	Winter	?	?	
	FW	(Romania)	Niculescu	32	EU	Omonia Nicosia (Cyprus)	Transfer	Winter	?	?	
	DM	(Senegal)	N'Doye	30	Non-EU	Vaslui	Transfer	Winter	?	?	

=== Out ===
No.	Pos.	Nat.	Name	Age	EU	Moving to	Type	Transfer window	Transfer fee	Source
	CB	(Romania)	Moţi		EU	Siena (Italy)	Loan	Summer	—	
	CB	(Serbia)	Pekarić		Non-EU	Red Star (Serbia)	Loan	Summer	—	
	RB	(Romania)	Stoican		EU		End of contract	Summer	—	
	RB	(Romania)	Scarlatache		EU	Otopeni	Loan	Summer	—	
	CB	(Romania)	Todorovski		EU	Gloria Bistriţa	Loan	Summer	?	
	LM	(Romania)	Munteanu		EU	Braşov	Transfer	Summer	—	
	FW	(Romania)	Ganea		EU	Otopeni	Loan	Summer	—	
	GK	(Latvia)	Romanovs		EU	Slavia Prague (Czech Republic)	Transfer	Winter	?	
	CB	(Brazil)	Júlio César		Non-EU	Gaziantepspor (Turkey)	Transfer	Winter	?	
	LB	(Peru)	Galliquio		Non-EU	Universitario (Peru)	Transfer	Winter	?	
	DM	(Romania)	Ropotan		EU	Dynamo Moscow (Russia)	Transfer	Winter	?	
	CM	(Mali)	Diakité		Non-EU	Belenenses (Portugal)	Transfer	Winter	?	
	FW	(Romania)	Cristea		EU	Politehnica Iași	Loaned	Winter	?	

Last updated: October 2011

== Results ==
Liga 1
Round	Date/Time	Opponent	Stadium	Score	Scorers (minute)
I	27.07/21:15	Pandurii Târgu Jiu	A	1–1	Torje (55)
II	03.08/20:30	Gaz Metan Mediaş	H	1–0	Bratu (27)
III	10.08/20:00	CS Otopeni	A	3–2	Nyema (o.g. 9), Bratu (45), Niculae (85)
IV	16.08/21:45	Gloria Buzău	H	4–1	Dănciulescu (8, 44), Diogo da Silva (o.g. 48), Bratu (74)
V	24.08/20:45	Rapid București	A	1–2	Bratu (70)
VI	30.08/20:45	Univ. Craiova	H	1–0	Niculae (52)
VII	13.09/19:00	FC Vaslui	A	2–1	Dănciulescu (61), Bratu (90)
VIII	22.09/21:00	Poli Iaşi	H	2–0	Bratu (46, 61)
IX	26.09/16:30	Gloria Bistriţa	A	2–1	Dănciulescu (12, 33)
X	05.10/19:00	FC Farul Constanţa	H	1–0	An.Cristea (48)
XI	17.10/20:45	CFR Cluj	A	0–1	
XII	25.10/20:45	Oţelul Galaţi	H	1–0	Torje (60)
XIII	01.11/21:00	Steaua București	H	1–1	Ad. Cristea (84)
XIV	08.11/20:30	FC Timişoara	A	3–0	Brezinsky (o.g. 12), Dănciulescu (52), An. Cristea (67)
XV	16.11/21:00	Unirea Urziceni	H	0–1	
XVI	22.11/14:00	FC Brașov	A	0–2	
XVII	29.11/20:00	FC Argeş	H	2–0	Ad. Cristea (65), Miranda (90)
XVIII	01.03/20:30	Pandurii Târgu Jiu	H	3–0	Niculae (2), Niculescu (29), Zicu (90)
XIX	07.03/15:00	Gaz Metan Mediaş	A	1–1	N'Doye (18)
XX	15.03/18:00	CS Otopeni	H	0–0	
XXI	22.03/17:00	Gloria Buzău	A	3–1	Niculescu (12), Niculae (30), Dănciulescu (57)
XXII	04.04/21:00	Rapid București	H	3–0	Dănciulescu (29), Niculae (56), Ad.Cristea (89)
XXIII	08.04/21:00	Univ. Craiova	A	0–2	
XXIV	11.04/20:30	FC Vaslui	H	4–1	Niculae (24, 78, 90) Zicu (87)
XXV	18.04/16:00	Poli Iaşi	A	0–1	
XXVI	21.04/17:00	Gloria Bistriţa	H	5–0	Niculae (20, 56, 73), Miranda (84), Dănciulescu (90)
XXVII	24.04/18:00	Farul Constanţa	A	4–1	Ad.Cristea (38), Dănciulescu (40), Torje (53), Niculescu (80)
XXVIII	02.05/21:00	CFR Cluj	H	1–0	Dănciulescu (44)
XXIX	05.05/16:00	Oţelul Galaţi	A	1–0	Dănciulescu (34)
XXX	08.05/21:00	Steaua București	A	1–1	Niculescu (88)
XXXI	17.05/20:30	FC Timişoara	H	3–1	N'Doye (39, 49), Niculae (45)
XXXII	24.05/20:30	Unirea Urziceni	A	0–1	
XXXIII	31.05/20:30	FC Brașov	H	0–2	
XXXIV	10.06/20:00	FC Argeş	A	2–5	Zicu (31), Niculescu (90)

Cupa României
Round	Hour	Opponent	Stadium	Score	Scorers
Round of 32	14.10/14:45	FCM Târgu Mureş	A	2–1	Dănciulescu (69), Boştină (90)
Round of 16	12.11/14:00	FC Botoşani	N	3–1	An.Cristea (51, 83), Dănciulescu (66)
Quarterfinals	15.04/20:45	Rapid București	H	4–2	Perjă (o.g.19), Boştină (37), Niculae (67, 80)
Semifinals	28.04/20:45	FC Timişoara	N	1–4	Ad.Cristea (72)

=== Europe ===
UEFA Cup first round

18 September 2008
19:45

Nijmegen (Netherlands)	1–0	Dinamo București
Jhon van Beukering 58'	Report

McDOS Goffertstadion, Nijmegen
Attendance: 11,500
Referee: Jouni Hyytiä (Finland)

2 October 2008
19:30

Dinamo București	0–0	(Netherlands) Nijmegen
	Report

Stadionul Dinamo, București
Attendance: 13,000
Referee: Stefan Johannesson (Sweden)

Nijmegen won 1–0 on aggregate.

== Squad ==
Goalkeepers: Emilian Dolha (5/0), Bogdan Lobonţ (25/0), Florin Matache (4/0)

Defenders: George Blay (17/0), Zie Diabaté (8/0), Lucian Goian (20/0), Dragoş Grigore (2/0), Sergiu Homei (10/0), Silviu Izvoranu (17/0), Júlio César (10/0), Cosmin Moţi (21/0), Nicolae Muşat (1/0), Cristian Pulhac (10/0), Adrian Scarlatache (12/0), Bruno Simão (10/0), Gabriel Tamaş (22/0)

Midfielders: Anoh Attoukora (1/0), Papa Malick Ba (9/0), Gabriel Boştină (26/0), Gualberto Campos (2/0), Adrian Cristea (32/4), Mourtala Diakité (6/0), Nicolae Mitea (12/0), Ousmane N'Doye (12/3), Adrian Ropotan (15/0), Thiago (6/0), Gabriel Torje (30/3), Vojislav Vranjković (4/0), Zé Kalanga (10/0)

Forwards: Florin Bratu (10/7), Andrei Cristea (8/2), Ionel Dănciulescu (34/12), Jean-Philippe Mendy (1/0), Osvaldo Miranda (16/2), Marius Niculae (24/12), Claudiu Niculescu (14/5), Ianis Zicu (9/3)
