= Antwi =

Antwi is a surname. Notable people with the surname include:

- Akwasi Antwi (born 1985), Canadian football player
- Christopher Antwi-Adjei (born 1994), Ghanaian footballer
- Clinton Antwi (born 1999), Ghanaian footballer
- Denny Antwi (born 1993), Ghanaian footballer
- Emmanuel Antwi (born 1996), Ghanaian footballer
- Ernest Antwi (born 1995), Ghanaian footballer
- Eugene Boakye Antwi (born 1970), Ghanaian politician
- Godwin Antwi (born 1988), Ghanaian-Spanish footballer
- Jayden Antwi-Nyame (born 1998), English footballer
- John Antwi (born 1992), Ghanaian footballer
- John Asare-Antwi (born 1935), Ghanaian sprinter
- Kojo Antwi, Ghanaian musician
- Kwame Anyimadu-Antwi (born 1962), Ghanaian politician
- Matthew Kwaku Antwi (born 1941), Ghanaian politician
- Nana Antwi Manu (born 1994), Ghanaian footballer
- Patrick Antwi (born 1987), Ghanaian footballer
- Rodney Antwi (born 1995), Dutch footballer
- Samuel Antwi (born 1991), English professional boxer
- Solomon Kojo Antwi (born 2000), Ghanaian footballer
- Will Antwi (born 1982), Anglo-Ghanaian footballer
- Yaw Antwi (born 1985), Ghanaian footballer
