= Portugal national under-20 football team =

National association football team

Portugal Under-20
- Association: Federação Portuguesa de Futebol
- Confederation: UEFA (Europe)
- Head coach: Oceano Cruz
- Captain: Diogo Prioste
- Most caps: Tiago Ferreira (28)
- Top scorer: Nuno Gomes; Lourenço; Nélson Oliveira (9 goals each)
- FIFA code: POR
First colours	Second colours

First international
- Spain 1–0 Portugal (Cáceres, Spain; 7 May 1979)

Biggest win
- Macau 0–6 Portugal (São Tomé, São Tomé and Príncipe; 5 October 2006); São Tomé and Príncipe 0–6 Portugal (Macau; 5 October 2006)

Biggest defeat
- Japan 4–1 Portugal (Tokyo, Japan; 26 August 1994)

FIFA U-20 World Cup
- Appearances: 12 (first in 1979)
- Best result: Champions (1989, 1991)

The Portugal national under-20 football team is the national under-20 football team of Portugal and is controlled by the Portuguese Football Federation, the governing body for football in Portugal.

The U20 team acts mainly as a feeder team for the under-21s and provides further international development for youth players. The team qualified for its only official match, FIFA U-20 World Cup, depends on U19 results.

The Portuguese team has 12 participations in the FIFA U-20 World Cup and 12 in the Toulon Tournament.

== History ==
=== The Golden Generation (1989–1991) ===
The Golden Generation was the Generation of the players that won consecutive FIFA Youth Championships in 1989 and 1991.

=== The Silver Generation (2011) ===
The Courage Generation was the Generation of players that was runner up in the 2011 FIFA U-20 World Cup.

== Competitive record ==
=== FIFA U-20 World Cup ===
Year	Round	GP	W	D	L	GS	GA
(Tunisia) 1977	Did not enter						
(Japan) 1979	Quarter-finals	4	1	1	2	2	4
(Australia) 1981	Did not qualify						
(Mexico) 1983	Did not qualify						
(Soviet Union) 1985	Did not qualify						
(Chile) 1987	Did not qualify						
(Saudi Arabia) 1989	Champions	6	5	0	1	6	3
(Portugal) 1991	Champions	6	5	1	0	9	1
(Australia) 1993	Group stage	3	0	0	3	1	5
(Qatar) 1995	Third place	6	5	0	1	12	6
(Malaysia) 1997	Did not qualify						
(Nigeria) 1999	Round of 16	4	1	2	1	5	4
(Argentina) 2001	Did not qualify						
(United Arab Emirates) 2003	Did not qualify						
(Netherlands) 2005	Did not qualify						
(Canada) 2007	Round of 16	4	1	0	3	4	5
(Egypt) 2009	Did not qualify						
(Colombia) 2011	Runners-up	7	4	2	1	7	3
(Turkey) 2013	Round of 16	4	2	1	1	12	7
(New Zealand) 2015	Quarter-finals	5	4	1	0	12	2
(South Korea) 2017	Quarter-finals	5	2	2	1	9	7
(Poland) 2019	Group stage	3	1	1	1	2	3
(Argentina) 2023	Did not qualify						
(Chile) 2025	Did not qualify						
(Azerbaijan) (Uzbekistan) 2027	Did not qualify						
(Armenia) (Georgia (country)) 2029	To be determined						
Total	12/26	57	31	11	15	81	50

== Honours ==
=== Team ===
- FIFA U-20 World Cup
  - Winner (2): 1989, 1991
  - Runner-up (1): 2011
  - Third place (1): 1995
- Toulon/Maurice Revello Tournament
  - Winner (4): 1992, 2001, 2003, 2026
  - Runner-up (4): 1994, 1997, 2000, 2005
  - Third place (4): 1998, 2006, 2014, 2016
- U20 Elite League
  - Winner (1): 2025-26
  - Runner-up (1): 2018-19
- Torneio Internacional da Madeira
  - Winner (7): 1997, 2000, 2002, 2003, 2005, 2007, 2008
  - Runner-up (4): 1998, 2001, 2004, 2006
- Torneio Campos Verdes
  - Winner (2): 2007, 2008
- Copa El Presidente de La Republica - Ricardo Martinelli
  - Third place (1): 2011
- SBS Cup International Youth Soccer
  - Runner-up (1): 2012

=== Individual awards ===
- FIFA U-20 World Cup

Year	Golden Ball	Silver Ball	Bronze Ball
(Portugal) 1991	Emílio Peixe		Paulo Torres
(Portugal) 1995		Dani	
(Portugal) 2011		Nélson Oliveira	

Year	Golden Shoe	Silver Shoe	Bronze Show
(Portugal) 1995		Dani	
(Portugal) 2013		Bruma	

Year	Golden glove
(Portugal) 2011	Mika

- Toulon Tournament

Year	Top scorer
1996	Nuno Gomes
1997	Carlitos
2001	Lourenço
2003	Lourenço
2005	Ricardo Vaz Tê

Year	Most Elegant Player
1997	Edgar Pacheco
2000	Ednilson
2001	Ricardo Costa
2004	Raul Meireles
2005	Organista
2007	Bruno Gama

Year	Best Goalkeeper
1997	Nuno Santos
1998	Nuno Santos
2000	Sérgio Leite
2003	Bruno Vale
2016	Joel Pereira

Year	Revelation
2014	Ricardo Horta

== Players ==
=== Current squad ===
The following players were called up for the Under 20 Elite League matches against Switzerland and Czech Republic on 27 and 30 March 2026; respectively.

Caps and goals correct as of 30 March 2026, after the match against the Czech Republic.

No.	Pos.	Player	Date of birth (age)	Caps	Goals	Club
1	GK	Francisco Silva	20 November 2005 (age 21)	1	0	(Portuguese Football Federation) Sporting CP
12	FW	Diogo Fernandes	17 February 2005 (age 21)	6	0	(Portuguese Football Federation) Porto
	GK	João Afonso	30 April 2007 (age 19)	0	0	(Portuguese Football Federation) Santa Clara
2	DF	José Silva	20 August 2005 (age 21)	5	0	(Portuguese Football Federation) Arouca
3	DF	Miguel Alves	30 December 2005 (age 20)	2	0	(Portuguese Football Federation) Sporting CP
4	DF	José Sampaio	4 January 2005 (age 21)	6	0	(Portuguese Football Federation) Vizela
5	DF	Tiago Parente	12 June 2006 (age 20)	2	0	(Portuguese Football Federation) Benfica
13	DF	Gu Costa	15 September 2005 (age 21)	2	0	(Portuguese Football Federation) Académico de Viseu
14	DF	André Oliveira	15 February 2006 (age 20)	3	0	(Portuguese Football Federation) Vitória de Guimarães
15	DF	Jónatas Noro	9 July 2005 (age 21)	10	0	(Portuguese Football Federation) Braga
23	DF	Dinis	12 January 2005 (age 21)	3	0	(Portuguese Football Federation) Porto
6	MF	Mathys De Carvalho	1 May 2005 (age 21)	2	0	(French Football Federation) Lyon
8	MF	Afonso Assis	15 July 2006 (age 20)	2	0	(Portuguese Football Federation) Moreirense
10	MF	Manuel Mendonça	24 March 2005 (age 21)	2	0	(Portuguese Football Federation) Sporting CP
19	MF	Tiago Freitas	17 August 2006 (age 20)	2	2	(Portuguese Football Federation) Benfica
21	MF	Martim Ferreira	26 January 2006 (age 20)	2	0	(Portuguese Football Federation) Benfica
	MF	Rafael Luís	18 February 2005 (age 21)	0	0	(French Football Federation) Strasbourg
	MF	Miguel Nogueira	27 February 2005 (age 21)	0	0	(Portuguese Football Federation) Vitória Guimarães
7	FW	Gonçalo Sousa	30 June 2006 (age 20)	6	0	(Portuguese Football Federation) Porto
9	FW	Gustavo Varela	30 January 2005 (age 21)	1	1	(Portuguese Football Federation) Gil Vicente
11	FW	Fabio Baldé	20 July 2005 (age 21)	2	1	(German Football Association) Hamburger SV
16	FW	Tiago Andrade	21 October 2005 (age 21)	9	3	(Portuguese Football Federation) Porto
17	FW	Rafael Nel	3 April 2005 (age 21)	3	0	(Portuguese Football Federation) Sporting CP
18	FW	Vivaldo Semedo	28 January 2005 (age 21)	2	1	(The Football Association) Watford
20	FW	Mauro Couto	15 November 2005 (age 21)	2	0	(Portuguese Football Federation) Sporting CP

=== Recent call-ups ===
The following players have previously been called up to the Portugal under-20 squad in the last twelve months and remain eligible for selection.

Pos.	Player	Date of birth (age)	Caps	Goals	Club	Latest call-up
GK	Gonçalo Ribeiro	15 January 2006 (age 20)	2	0	(Portugal) Porto	v. Poland, 9 September 2025
GK	José Ribeiro	13 May 2006 (age 20)	0	0	(Portugal) Vitória de Guimarães	v. Poland, 9 September 2025
DF	Leandro Santos	28 September 2005 (age 21)	6	0	(Portugal) Benfica	v. Poland, 9 September 2025
DF	Luís Gomes	13 April 2005 (age 21)	4	0	(Portugal) Porto	v. Poland, 9 September 2025
DF	Rayhan Momade	5 January 2006 (age 20)	0	0	(Portugal) Sporting CP	v. Poland, 9 September 2025
DF	Guilherme Peixoto	25 May 2006 (age 20)	0	0	(Netherlands) Twente	v. Poland, 9 September 2025
DF	Ricardo Ribeiro	26 April 2006 (age 20)	0	0	(Portugal) Vitória de Guimarães	v. Poland, 9 September 2025
MF	João Rego	20 June 2005 (age 21)	6	0	(Portugal) Benfica	v. Poland, 9 September 2025
MF	Leonardo Cardoso	18 October 2006 (age 20)	0	0	(England) Chelsea	v. Poland, 9 September 2025
MF	Gabriel Costa	14 November 2006 (age 20)	0	0	(Portugal) Feirense	v. Poland, 9 September 2025
MF	Lucas Ferreira	25 November 2006 (age 19)	0	0	(Switzerland) Luzern	v. Poland, 9 September 2025
MF	Gonçalo Moreira	3 January 2006 (age 20)	0	0	(Portugal) Benfica	v. Poland, 9 September 2025
MF	João Veloso	26 June 2005 (age 21)	5	0	(Portugal) Benfica	September 2025 Camp^{SEN}
FW	Rodrigo Ribeiro	28 April 2005 (age 21)	9	1	(Portugal) Sporting CP	v. Poland, 9 September 2025
FW	Gustavo Ferreira	29 May 2007 (age 19)	0	0	(Portugal) Benfica	v. Poland, 9 September 2025
FW	Olívio Tomé	27 January 2006 (age 20)	0	0	(Portugal) Benfica	v. Poland, 9 September 2025
FW	Keyan Varela	26 April 2006 (age 20)	0	0	(Switzerland) Servette	September 2025 Camp^{INJ}
^{INJ} Withdrew due to injury.^{SEN} Called up to Under-21s squad.

== Head-to-head record ==
The following table shows Portugal's head-to-head record in the FIFA U-20 World Cup.

Opponent	Pld	W	D	L	GF	GA	GD	Win %
Argentina	4	2	1	1	4	2	+2	50.00
Australia	2	2	0	0	3	1	+2	100.00
Brazil	5	1	2	2	3	4	−1	20.00
Cameroon	1	1	0	0	1	0	+1	100.00
Canada	1	0	0	1	1	3	−2	0.00
Chile	1	0	0	1	0	1	−1	0.00
Colombia	2	2	0	0	4	1	+3	100.00
Costa Rica	1	0	1	0	1	1	+0	0.00
Cuba	1	1	0	0	5	0	+5	100.00
Czech Republic	1	1	0	0	1	0	+1	100.00
France	1	1	0	0	2	0	+2	100.00
Gambia	1	0	0	1	1	2	−1	0.00
Germany	1	0	0	1	0	1	−1	0.00
Ghana	2	0	0	2	2	5	−3	0.00
Guatemala	1	1	0	0	1	0	+1	100.00
Honduras	1	1	0	0	3	2	+1	100.00
Iran	1	1	0	0	2	1	+1	100.00
Japan	1	0	1	0	1	1	+0	0.00
Korea	1	1	0	0	1	0	+1	100.00
Mali	1	0	0	1	1	2	−1	0.00
Mexico	2	1	0	1	3	3	+0	50.00
Netherlands	1	1	0	0	3	0	+3	100.00
New Zealand	3	3	0	0	5	1	+4	100.00
Nigeria	3	3	0	0	6	2	+4	100.00
Paraguay	1	1	0	0	1	0	+1	100.00
Qatar	1	1	0	0	4	0	+4	100.00
Republic of Ireland	1	1	0	0	2	0	+2	100.00
Saudi Arabia	1	0	0	1	0	3	−3	0.00
Senegal	1	1	0	0	3	0	+3	100.00
South Africa	1	0	1	0	1	1	+0	0.00
South Korea	5	3	2	0	9	4	+5	60.00
Spain	1	1	0	0	3	2	+1	100.00
Uruguay	5	0	3	2	3	5	−2	0.00
Zambia	1	0	0	1	1	2	−1	0.00
Total	57	31	11	15	81	50	+31	54.39

=== Previous squads ===
FIFA U-20 World Cup

- 1979 FIFA U-20 World Cup squads - Portugal
- 1989 FIFA U-20 World Cup squads - Portugal
- 1991 FIFA U-20 World Cup squads - Portugal
- 1993 FIFA U-20 World Cup squads - Portugal
- 1995 FIFA U-20 World Cup squads - Portugal
- 1999 FIFA U-20 World Cup squads - Portugal
- 2007 FIFA U-20 World Cup squads - Portugal
- 2011 FIFA U-20 World Cup squads - Portugal
- 2013 FIFA U-20 World Cup squads - Portugal
- 2015 FIFA U-20 World Cup squads - Portugal
- 2017 FIFA U-20 World Cup squads - Portugal

Toulon Tournament

- 2007 Toulon Tournament squads - Portugal
- 2011 Toulon Tournament squads - Portugal

=== Most appearances ===
#	Name	Caps	Goals	First cap	Latest cap
1	Tiago Ferreira	28	2	July 13, 2011	July 3, 2013
2	Paulo Costa	20	5	September 10, 1998	June 3, 2000
2	Sérgio Oliveira	20	3	October 7, 2010	April 18, 2012
4	Ricardo Esteves	19	0	September 10, 1998	June 3, 2000
4	Danilo Pereira	19	3	October 7, 2010	August 21, 2011
4	Pelé	19	3	October 7, 2010	August 21, 2011
4	Nuno Reis	19	0	October 7, 2010	August 21, 2011
4	Nélson Oliveira	19	9	October 7, 2010	August 21, 2011

=== Most goals ===
#	Name	Goals	Caps	First cap	Latest cap
1	Nuno Gomes	9	13	June 2, 1995	January 21, 1997
1	Lourenço	9	17	22 February 2001	June 21, 2003
1	Nélson Oliveira	9	19	October 7, 2010	August 21, 2011
4	André Silva	8	10	November 17, 2014	June 14, 2015
5	Bruma	6	6	March 24, 2013	July 3, 2013
5	Carlitos	6	11	May 27, 1997	May 19, 1998
5	Paulo Torres	6	12	December 18, 1990	June 30, 1991
5	Bruno Gama	6	14	November 21, 2006	July 8, 2007
5	Dani	6	15	August 26, 1994	June 1, 1996
6	Ricardo Vaz Tê	5	8	February 16, 2005	September 22, 2005

== Head coaches ==
As of 2022

Manager	Period	Record						
Manager	Period	Matches	Won	Draw	Lost	GF	GA	GD
(Portugal) Peres Bandeira	1979							
(Portugal) Carlos Queiroz	1989–1991							
(Portugal) Agostinho Oliveira	1993							
(Portugal) Nelo Vingada	1994–1995							
(Portugal) Jesualdo Ferreira	1996–2000							
(Portugal) António Violante	2001–2002; 2008–2009							
(Portugal) Rui Caçador	2003–2004; 2007–2008							
(Portugal) José Couceiro	2006–2007	21	13	4	4	37	8	+29
(Portugal) Paulo Alves	2009–2010	5	3	1	1	9	3	+6
(Portugal) Oceano Cruz	2010							
(Portugal) Ilídio Vale	2010–2012	24	9	12	3	27	20	+7
(Portugal) Edgar Borges	2012–2014; 2015–2016	29	5	3	3	17	12	+5
(Portugal) Hélio Sousa	2014–2015; 2018–2019	24	16	3	5	46	22	+24
(Portugal) Emílio Peixe	2016–2017; 2021–2022	19	6	8	5	33	29	+4
(Portugal) José Guilherme	2017–2018	7	2	1	4	7	12	-5
(Portugal) Filipe Ramos	2019–2020	6	1	2	3	7	13	-6
(Portugal) Rui Bento	2020–2021							

Awards
Preceded by Portugal national under-23 canoe sprint team	Portuguese Team of the Year; 2011	Succeeded by 1000 meter K2 team (Emanuel Silva and Fernando Pimenta)
