= Tom Bertram =

Tom Bertram may refer to:

- Tom Bertram (field hockey) (born 1977), English field hockey player
- Tom Bertram (footballer) (born 1987), German footballer
- Thomas Bertram, a supporting character in Jane Austen's 1814 novel Mansfield Park
