= John Paintsil =

Ghanaian former professional footballer (born 1981)

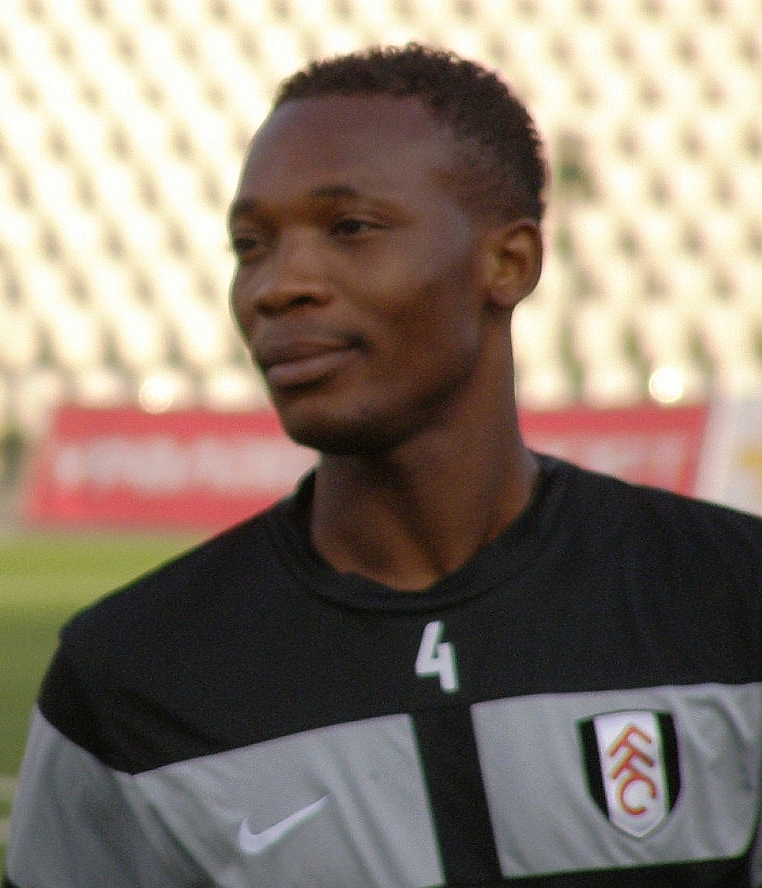
- Paintsil with Fulham in 2009

Personal information
- Full name: John Paintsil
- Date of birth: 15 June 1981 (age 45)
- Place of birth: Berekum, Brong-Ahafo, Ghana
- Height: 1.78 m (5 ft 10 in)
- Positions: Full back; defensive midfielder

Team information
- Current team: Kaizer Chiefs (assistant manager)

Youth career
- 1997–1999: Berekum Arsenal

Senior career*
Years	Team	Apps	(Gls)
1999–2000	Berekum Arsenal	0	(0)
2000–2001	Liberty Professionals	10	(0)
2001–2002	Berekum Arsenal	12	(1)
2002–2004	Maccabi Tel Aviv	46	(0)
2004–2006	Hapoel Tel Aviv	46	(4)
2006–2008	West Ham United	19	(0)
2008–2011	Fulham	75	(0)
2011–2012	Leicester City	6	(0)
2012–2013	Hapoel Tel Aviv	9	(0)
2013–2014	Santos	17	(0)
2014–2016	Maritzburg United	34	(0)
Total		274	(5)

International career
2001–2013	Ghana	91	(0)

Managerial career
- 2016–: Kaizer Chiefs (assistant manager)
- * Club domestic league appearances and goals

John Paintsil (born 15 June 1981) is a Ghanaian former professional footballer who was an assistant coach at Kaizer Chiefs in the South African Premiership. He played club football for Berekum Arsenal, Liberty Professionals, Maccabi Tel Aviv, Hapoel Tel Aviv, West Ham United, Fulham, Leicester City, Santos and Maritzburg United as well as internationally for Ghana.

His family name is Paintsil but at birth it was registered as Pantsil in error. This then subsequently appeared on his passport and his registration with the Premier League.

== Club career ==
=== Early career ===
A player comfortable at right back or in midfield, Paintsil had stints in his native Ghana with Berekum Arsenal and Liberty Professionals and a brief spell with Polish side Widzew Łódź before moving to Israeli club Maccabi Tel Aviv in 2002.

=== Maccabi Tel Aviv ===
Pantsil joined Israeli club Maccabi Tel Aviv in 2002, where he was a member of the team that won both the Israeli title and reached the Cup semi-final. He made 46 league appearances and five appearances in the Champions League.

=== Hapoel Tel Aviv ===
In December 2004, he transferred to rivals Hapoel Tel Aviv helping them to second place in the league in 2006 and to win the Israeli State Cup in May 2006. He made 42 appearances for Hapoel, scoring three goals.

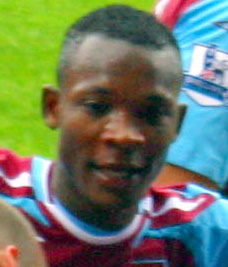
Paintsil playing for West Ham United in 2008

=== West Ham United ===
After the 2006 World Cup, Israeli international Yossi Benayoun recommended Paintsil to West Ham United manager Alan Pardew as the Premier League club was in need of a right-back. Pardew took Pantsil with the rest of the squad on their pre-season tour of Sweden. Impressive performances by Paintsil during West Ham's Swedish tour allowed him to gain favour with Pardew. In August 2006, West Ham completed the signing of Paintsil after a work permit was granted. Paintsil was given the number 14 shirt at West Ham and competed for a place in the side with Tyrone Mears and Jonathan Spector. He made only five appearances for West Ham during the 2006–07 season and in the summer of 2007 was weighing up his options in order to ensure his place in the Ghana national team for the 2008 Africa Cup of Nations. However, the defender remained at West Ham and in July 2008, with the majority of his 24 games for West Ham being substitute appearances, Paintsil was given permission to speak to Fulham with a view to a move.

=== Fulham ===
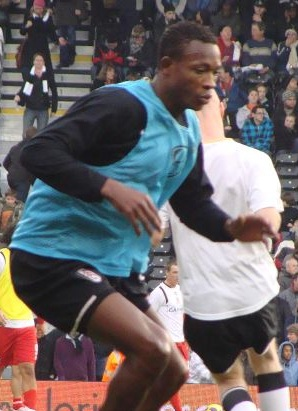
Paintsil with Fulham in 2008

On 15 July 2008, Paintsil and teammate Bobby Zamora completed their moves to Fulham for a combined transfer fee of £6.3 million. He became a first team regular during the 2008–09 season, helping the Cottagers to a record seventh-place finish. His performances improved as the season progressed and he retained a regular starting place in the 2009–10 season. In June 2011 new Fulham manager Martin Jol announced that Pantsil had played his last game for Fulham and that he would not be returning for the 2011–12 season. He was released by Fulham in June 2011.

=== Leicester City ===
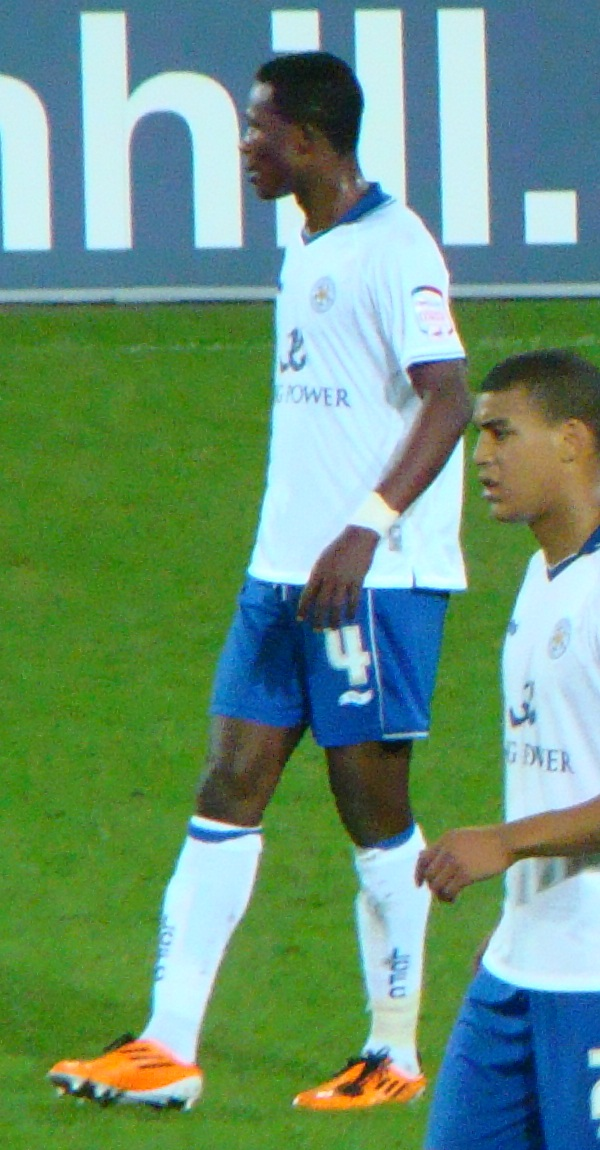
Paintsil playing for Leicester City

On 21 July 2011, Paintsil joined Leicester City on a free transfer. He became manager Sven-Göran Eriksson's eighth signing of the summer. Paintsil was released by Leicester in May 2012 having made seven appearances in all competitions. He had made no appearances since the appointment of new Leicester manager, Nigel Pearson in November 2011 and had not played for Leicester since October 2011.

=== Hapoel Tel Aviv ===
On 12 August 2012, Paintsil returned to Israel by signing at Hapoel Tel Aviv for one season.

=== Santos ===
Paintsil joined Santos in the National First Division on 10 October 2013 after failing to agree terms with Premiership team Polokwane City.

=== Maritzburg United ===
On 8 July 2014, Paintsil joined Maritzburg United. On 29 January 2016 he was released by Maritzburg United, following a falling out with manager Ernst Middendorp on disciplinary grounds together with teammate Ashley Hartog.

On 24 June 2016, Paintsil retired from football.

== International career ==
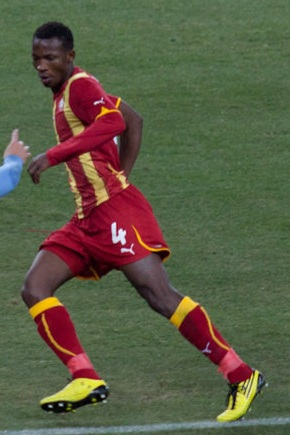
Paintsil playing for Ghana's national team during the FIFA World Cup 2010

Paintsil was a member of the Ghana Under 21 team who were runner-up in the FIFA World Youth Championship in Argentina in 2001 and played for the senior team in the African Cup of Nations in Mali in 2002 and Egypt in 2006. He was also a member of the Ghana 2004 Olympics football team who exited in the first round in Greece, having finished in third place in Group B. Paintsil played in all the matches of Ghana's national team in the 2006 World Cup finals, where Ghana were beaten by Brazil in the second round.

Following the first and second goals in Ghana's 2–0 victory over the Czech Republic on 17 June 2006, he celebrated by waving an Israeli flag, he also waved as the final whistle blew. This action provoked some protests in his native country Ghana and the Arab world. Afterwards the Ghanaian Football Association issued an apology, and said of Pantsil "He was naive". He was a member of the Ghanaian 2010 World Cup team that reached the quarter-finals in South Africa before losing to Uruguay. He played in all five games. On 13 June 2010, in a World Cup group-stage match against Serbia, another variation of his name appeared on his jersey, Panstil.

== Managerial career ==
=== Kaizer Chiefs ===
On 27 June 2016, Paintsil became the new assistant manager at Kaizer Chiefs.

He currently serves as an assistant coach of the Ghana national football team, the Black Stars, a role he held during Ghana's build-up to the 2026 FIFA World Cup alongside Fatau Dauda and Joseph Laumann.

== Personal life ==
Paintsil's family reportedly received repeated death threats in Ghana. His younger brother Mark fled to Israel on a tourist visa. His visa expired and he was jailed whilst applying for political asylum pending immigration status decisions. According to Mark, the rest of the family is in Britain and cannot go back to Ghana. He was quoted as saying "I cannot return to Ghana because I truly fear for my life. My sister, after returning to Ghana, joined my brother and parents in London immediately, and now I am in prison and there is nothing I can do." John is also famous for his lap of honor at home matches, he sometimes only wears one sleeve on his left arm in the winter, leaving his right arm bare by simply cutting off the other sleeve. During an interview with The West Ham Way, Paintsil revealed that a dream where he played particularly well with one long and one short sleeve led to him adopting this unusual habit.

In September 2024, Paintsil was involved in a car crash along with Otto Addo and Fatau Dauda after their vehicle was damaged as it avoided a head-on collision with a pick-up truck that veered into their lane. The Ghana Football Association issued a statement shortly after the incident confirming that all three individuals were in stable condition.

== Career statistics ==
=== International appearances ===
Paintsil – appearances for Ghana
National team	Year	Apps	Goals
Ghana	2001	1	0
Ghana	2002	7	0
Ghana	2003	1	0
Ghana	2004	0	0
Ghana	2005	5	0
Ghana	2006	12	0
Ghana	2007	7	0
Ghana	2008	15	0
Ghana	2009	10	0
Ghana	2010	9	0
Ghana	2011	9	0
Ghana	2012	7	0
Ghana	2013	6	0
Total		89	0
Correct as of 6 February 2013

== Honours ==
=== Player ===
Maccabi Tel Aviv

- Israeli Premier League: 2002–03

Hapoel Tel Aviv

- Israel State Cup: 2006

Fulham

- UEFA Europa League runner up: 2009–10

Ghana

- Africa Cup of Nations Bronze Medal: 2008

Individual

- CAF Team of the Year: 2009
