= Patrick Antwi =

Ghanaian football player

Personal information
- Date of birth: 4 November 1987 (age 38)
- Place of birth: Prestea, Ghana
- Height: 1.86 m (6 ft 1 in)
- Position: Goalkeeper

Team information
- Current team: Ebusua Dwarfs
- Number: 20

Youth career
- Mine Stars FC

Senior career*
| Years | Team | Apps | (Gls) |
| 2005–2007 | Mine Stars FC | | |
| 2007–2009 | Liberty Professionals FC | | |
| 2009–2010 | Tema Youth | | |
| 2010–2012 | Liberty Professionals FC | | |
| 2012– | Ebusua Dwarfs | | |

International career
| 2008 | Ghana | 1 | (0) |
- * Club domestic league appearances and goals

Patrick Antwi (born 4 November 1987, in Prestea) is a Ghanaian football player who currently plays for Ebusua Dwarfs.

== Career ==
Antwi began his career by second division club Prestea Mine Stars F.C. and was later transferred to Liberty Professionals FC, in May 2009 signed with Tema Youth. He joined in summer 2010 back to Liberty Professionals F.C. After three years signed in September 2012 for Essienimpong Cape-Coast Mysterious Dwarfs Ebusua Dwarfs.

=== International ===
He made his debut for the Ghana national team in a friendly against Mexico in London during March 2008. Antwi played the second half of the match because Ghana's usual deputy goalkeeper, Abdul Fatawu Dauda, was unable to travel to the United Kingdom in time for the match.
