= Oti Akenteng =

Ghanaian athlete and coach

Personal details
- Born: 1955 (age 70–71) Ghana

Francis Oti Akenteng is a former Ghanaian olympic athlete and coach. He is currently the Technical Director of the Ghana Football Association.
