= Fatau Dauda =

Ghanaian footballer (born 1985)

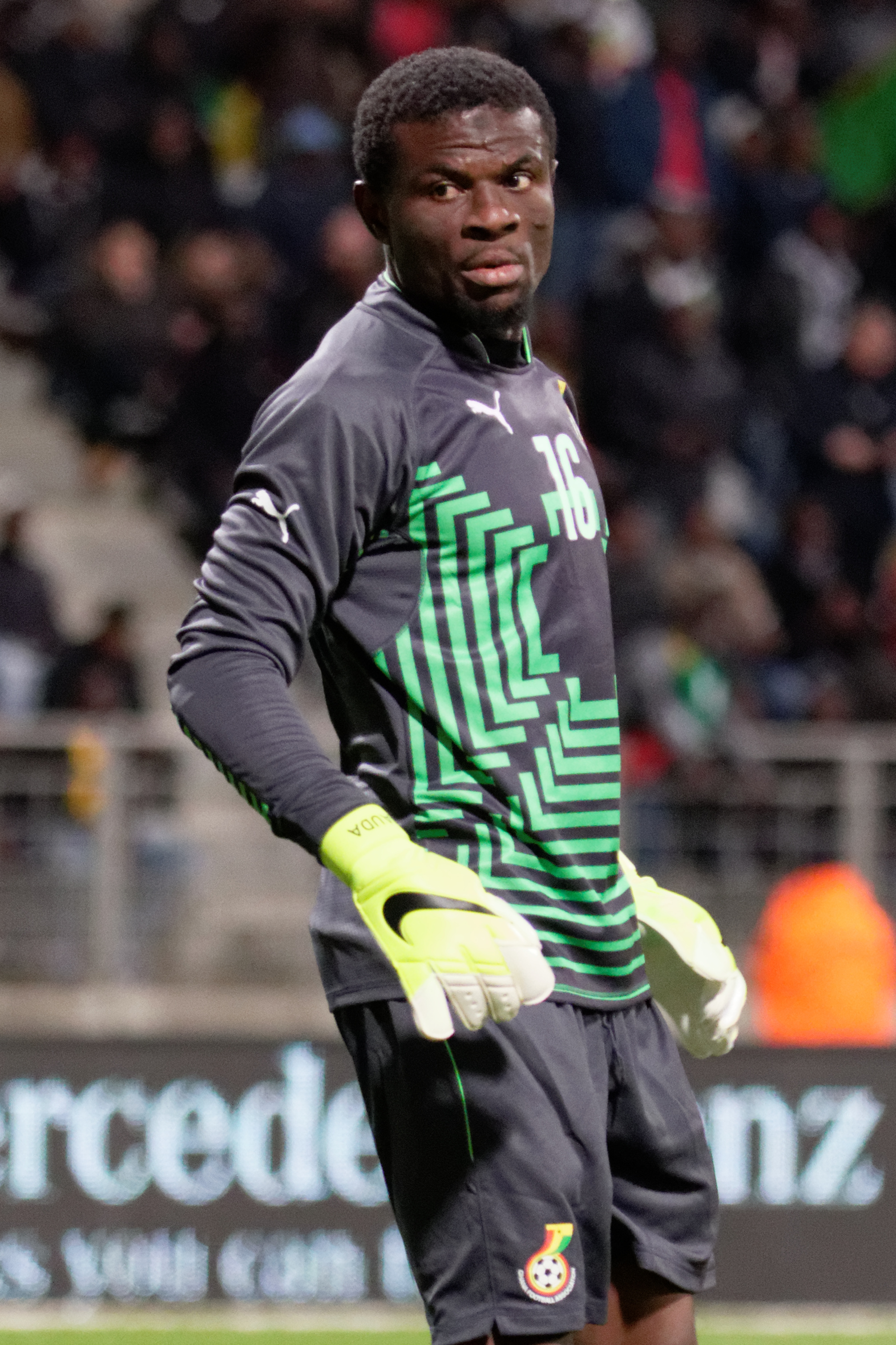
- Dauda with Ghana in 2015

Personal information
- Full name: Abdul Fatawu Dauda
- Date of birth: 6 April 1985 (age 41)
- Place of birth: Obuasi, Ashanti, Ghana
- Height: 1.80 m (5 ft 11 in)
- Position: Goalkeeper

Youth career
- 2004–2006: Okwawu United

Senior career*
Years	Team	Apps	(Gls)
2006–2013	Ashanti Gold	156	(0)
2013–2014	Orlando Pirates	3	(0)
2014	Chippa United	2	(0)
2014–2016	Ashanti Gold	30	(0)
2016–2019	Enyimba	23	(0)
2019–2020	Legon Cities	9	(0)
2022	Asante Kotoko	0	(0)

International career
2008–2015	Ghana	26	(0)
Medal record
Representing Ghana
Men's football
Africa Cup of Nations
Third place	2008 Ghana
Runner-up	2015 Equatorial Guinea
- * Club domestic league appearances and goals

Abdul Fatawu Dauda (Arabic: عبد ال فاتو داودا; born 6 April 1985), known as Fatau Dauda, is a Ghanaian former professional footballer who played as a goalkeeper.

== Club career ==
Dauda began his football career in 2004 with Ghana Division 1 League club Okwawu United, and in 2006 Dauda signed for Ghana Premier League club Ashanti Gold S.C. in his hometown Obuasi. Dauda was a member of the Ghana Premier League All Star Team 2007. On 5 July 2008, Dauda was nominated as Goalkeeper of the Year 2008 in Ghana.

Dauda moved to South Africa to play for Orlando Pirates in 2013. A backup for Senzo Meyiwa, he played only three matches at the Premier Soccer League and left the club for Chippa United the following season. After only two matches, Dauda left the club after not being paid.

On 1 October 2014, Dauda returned to Ashanti Gold.

In December 2016, Dauda joined two-time African Champions Enyimba International F.C.

== International career ==
Dauda was in the Ghana national team for the 2008 Africa Cup of Nations, and was the first choice keeper for the 2013 Africa Cup of Nations edition of the tournament.

On 12 May 2014, Ghana's coach, Akwasi Appiah, included Dauda in the preliminary list of 26 players pre-selected for the 2014 FIFA World Cup. Weeks later, on June 1, he was ratified on the final list of 23 players who travelled to Brazil.

== Personal life ==
In September 2024, Dauda was involved in a car crash along with Otto Addo and John Paintsil after their vehicle was damaged as it avoided a head-on collision with a pick-up truck that veered into their lane. The Ghana Football Association issued a statement shortly after the incident confirming that all three individuals were in stable condition.

== Career statistics ==
=== International ===
As of matches played on 15 July 2019

Ghana national team
Year	Apps	Goals
2008	2	0
2009	0	0
2010	0	0
2011	0	0
2012	2	0
2013	13	0
2014	4	0
2015	3	0
Total	24	0
