= Cristian Daminuță =

Romanian footballer

Personal information
- Full name: Cristian Alexandru Daminuță
- Date of birth: 15 February 1990 (age 36)
- Place of birth: Timișoara, Romania
- Height: 1.88 m (6 ft 2 in)
- Positions: Centre-back; defensive midfielder

Youth career
- CFR Timișoara
- Politehnica Timișoara
- 2008–2009: Inter Milan
- 2009: → Modena (loan)

Senior career*
Years	Team	Apps	(Gls)
2006–2008	Politehnica II Timișoara	34	(1)
2006–2008	Politehnica Timișoara	2	(0)
2008–2010	Inter Milan	1	(0)
2009	→ Modena (loan)	3	(0)
2010	→ Dinamo București (loan)	2	(0)
2010–2015	AC Milan	0	(0)
2010–2011	→ L'Aquila (loan)	1	(0)
2011	→ FC Tiraspol (loan)	8	(2)
2012	→ ACS Poli Timișoara (loan)	1	(0)
2013	→ Flacăra Făget (loan)	?	(?)
2013–2015	→ Viitorul Constanța (loan)	47	(1)
2015	Zakho	0	(0)
2016	FCM Baia Mare	16	(0)
2016	Ramat HaSharon	6	(1)
2017	Olimpia Satu Mare	3	(0)
2017–2018	Abano	3	(0)
2019	Millenium Giarmata	14	(4)
2019	Virtus Cupello	1	(0)
2020–2021	ACS Poli Timișoara	11	(1)
2021–2023	CSO Deta		
Total		153	(10)

International career
2006	Romania U17	3	(1)
2008–2009	Romania U19	4	(0)
- * Club domestic league appearances and goals

Cristian Alexandru Daminuță (born 15 February 1990) is a Romanian former professional footballer who played as a centre back or defensive midfielder.

== Club career ==
=== Politehnica Timișoara ===
Daminuță made his debut for Politehnica Timișoara in the 2005–06 Divizia A season, against Dinamo București.

=== Inter Milan ===
In 2008, he was signed by Inter Milan, spending the 2008–09 season with the Inter Milan youth team.

=== Modena loan ===
On 15 July 2009, both Modena and Inter Milan confirmed that Daminuță would spend the 2009–10 season on loan at Modena. He made his Serie B debut on 11 September 2009 against Lecce, when he came on the pitch at the 89th minute.

=== Dinamo București loan ===
At the start of 2010, he was loaned to Dinamo București.

=== AC Milan & L'Aquila loan ===
On 16 July 2010, Daminuță signed with AC Milan. only to be sent on loan to L'Aquila a month later.

=== Virtus Cupello ===
Daminuță joined Italian club ASD Virtus Cupello on 21 August 2019. He only appeared in one match, getting also on the scoresheet, before returning to Romania.

=== ACS Poli Timișoara ===
One month later, ACS Poli Timișoara announced that he had signed with the club.
