= Otto Addo =

Ghanaian football manager, scout and former player (born 1975)

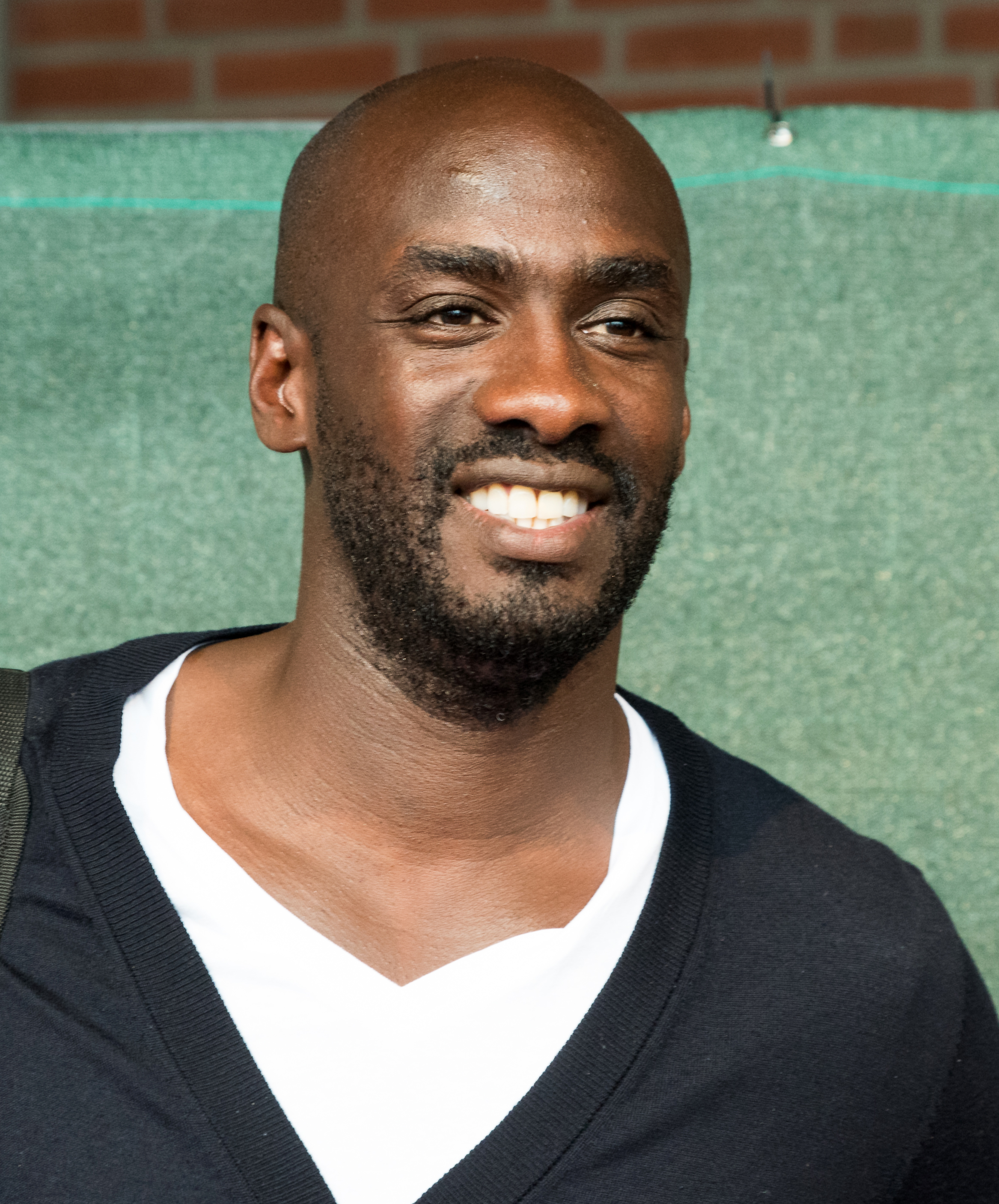
- Otto Addo at Tag der Legenden 2016

Personal information
- Full name: Nana Otto Addo
- Date of birth: 9 June 1975 (age 51)
- Place of birth: Hamburg, West Germany
- Height: 1.89 m (6 ft 2 in)
- Positions: Attacking midfielder; winger

Senior career*
| Years | Team | Apps | (Gls) |
| 1992–1993 | Bramfelder SV | | |
| 1993–1996 | VfL 93 Hamburg | 80 | (4) |
| 1996–1999 | Hannover 96 | 97 | (20) |
| 1999–2005 | Borussia Dortmund II | 5 | (0) |
| 1999–2005 | Borussia Dortmund | 75 | (11) |
| 2005–2007 | Mainz 05 | 19 | (0) |
| 2007 | Hamburger SV II | 10 | (0) |
| 2007–2008 | Hamburger SV | 4 | (0) |
| Total | | 290 | (35) |

International career
| 1999–2006 | Ghana | 15 | (2) |

Managerial career
- 2022: Ghana
- 2024–2026: Ghana
- * Club domestic league appearances and goals

Nana Otto Addo (born 9 June 1975) is a professional football manager and former professional football player. Born in Germany, he played for the Ghana national football team. He was most recently the manager for the Ghana national team and was previously a talent coach and interim first-team assistant coach for Borussia Dortmund.

== Early life ==
Addo was born on 9 June 1975 in Hamburg, West Germany, to Ghanaian parents. He has a dual nationality. As he played internationally for the Ghanaian football team, he also holds German citizenship.

== Club career ==
=== VfL 93 Hamburg ===
Addo started his career in 1991 in Hamburg, playing for Hamburger SV. In 1993, he left Bramfelder SV after playing there for a year to join fellow Hamburg side VfL 93 Hamburg in 1993, where he played 80 league matches and scored 4 goals from 1993 to 1996.

=== Hannover 96 ===
Addo moved to Hannover 96 in the Regionalliga Nord (third German league) in 1996. He made a big impression in a squad that featured stars-to-be Gerald Asamoah and Fabian Ernst. That team ripped through the season scoring more than 100 goals but succumbed to Energie Cottbus in the 1997 promotion playoffs.

In 1998, Hannover finally was promoted to the 2. Bundesliga. In his first season, he scored seven goals in 30 games and was acknowledged as one of the elite players of the league.

=== Borussia Dortmund ===
Addo was transferred to Borussia Dortmund in 1999 and played more than 75 times for the team, becoming Bundesliga champion in 2002. However, he was also hampered by great injury troubles, as he tore his cruciate ligaments three times in this time, the first coming after a German Cup match against SC Freiburg on 15 July 2001. The player had an MRI scan, which showed he had torn knee ligaments, and underwent surgery on his right knee on 22 July at the Vail, Colorado, clinic of world-renowned knee specialist surgeon Dr. Richard Steadman. He healed completely and came back to play the 2002 UEFA Cup Final for Dortmund against Feyenoord Rotterdam on 8 May 2002, which Dortmund lost 3–2 at the Feijenoord Stadion in Rotterdam. On 7 September 2002, Addo tore right knee ligaments for the second time, in a 2004 African Cup of Nations qualifier versus Uganda in Kampala.

On 24 September 2003, Addo's career was under threat after he re-injured his troublesome right knee for the third time in Dortmund's 2–1 UEFA Cup victory over Austria Wien. He started the match, but was replaced after just 38 minutes.

After sitting out the whole of 2004, Addo returned to action as a substitute in Dortmund's 1–1 league home draw with Borussia Mönchengladbach in the last weekend of January 2005.

=== Mainz 05 ===
At the beginning of the 2005–06 season, he transferred to 1. FSV Mainz 05, for whom he did not make an initial impact. However, he played well enough to earn a nomination for the Ghanaian squad who appeared at the 2006 World Cup.

=== Hamburger SV ===
On 9 August 2007, Addo signed a three-year contract with hometown Hamburger SV, initially alternating with the reserves and the first team. While at Hamburg, Addo revealed his Hamburger SV goals in an interview with HSVLIVE, also addressing other topics. In 2008, he announced his retirement from playing football at the age of 33.

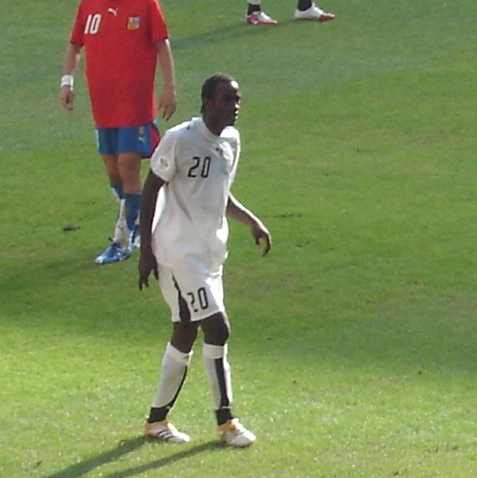
Otto Addo - Czech Republic vs Ghana at 2006 World Cup

== International career ==
Although born in Germany, Addo played for the Ghana national team for seven years commencing 1999, his debut being a 5–0 rout of Eritrea on 28 February 1999, and he achieved international prominence when he led the nation in the 2000 African Cup of Nations. He started for Ghana as right midfielder in the 2006 FIFA World Cup game against the Czech Republic on 17 June 2006 at the RheinEnergieStadion in Cologne, which Ghana won 2–0. In 2006 he played in Ghana's 2–1 win over the United States at the Frankenstadion in Nuremberg.

== Style of play ==
Addo was strong in one-on-one situations, physical, creative, and versatile enough to play on both wings, on the inside, and also in the central position, although his main skill was his ability to dribble the ball.

== Coaching career ==
Addo started his coaching career with his former club Hamburger SV in 2009, in the process serving as a youth team coach and an assistant manager till 2015. In December 2013, Addo was appointed as the head scout of the Ghana national football team prior to the 2014 FIFA World Cup and 2015 Africa Cup of Nations, succeeding Ibrahim Tanko following the 2012 Africa Cup of Nations and 2013 Africa Cup of Nations. He later served as an assistant coach at Danish Superliga club FC Nordsjælland during the 2016–17 season.

=== Borussia Dortmund ===
In April 2019, it was announced that Addo would work for former club Borussia Dortmund as a 'talent coach', having previously held a similar role at Borussia Mönchengladbach since 2017. In December 2020, he was promoted to serve as first team assistant coach to Edin Terzić who had been promoted to interim head coach, following the sacking of head coach Lucien Favre.

He won his first trophy as a coach after Dortmund defeated RB Leipzig in the finals of the 2020–21 DFB-Pokal. Following the assignment of Terzić as technical director and the appointment of Marco Rose as the new head coach, Addo resumed his work as a talent coach.

=== Ghana ===
On 25 September 2021, the Ghana Football Association announced that they had appointed Addo as one of two deputies for the new Ghana coach, Milovan Rajevac. On 9 February 2022, the Ghana Football Association announced that they had appointed Addo as the interim coach for the Ghana national football team ahead of the team's 2022 FIFA World Cup final play-off matches against Nigeria. On 29 March 2022, he qualified Ghana (on away goals) to the 2022 World Cup in Qatar, after drawing 1–1 against the Super Eagles of Nigeria. The Black Stars of Ghana had earlier drawn 0–0 against the Super Eagles on 25 March.

In May 2022, Addo was appointed as the head coach until the end of December 2022 alongside maintaining Chris Hughton as technical advisor and George Boateng and Mas-Ud Didi Dramani as assistant coaches, the same set-up for the 2022 FIFA World Cup final play-off matches against Nigeria. Addo won his first match as manager on 1 June after leading Ghana to a 3–0 victory over Madagascar in a 2023 AFCON qualifiers.

At the 2022 FIFA World Cup tournament, Ghana went on to lose their first match against Portugal by 3–2, however they won their second group game against South Korea by 3–2. Addo became the first Ghanaian to play for and coach the Ghana national team at the FIFA World Cup. That victory also made Addo the first Ghanaian coach to win a match at the FIFA World Cup. Five days later, Ghana lost to Uruguay and were eliminated from the tournament at the group stages. Prior to the start of the World Cup, Addo had hinted that he would be leaving after the world cup regardless of the outcome. Following their last group match, Addo resigned as the head coach of Ghana and would focus on his other role as a talent coach at Borussia Dortmund. Addo revealed the decision to leave the post as the head coach of Ghana Black star indicating the decision was not only in his hand.

==== Second Spell ====
On 15 March 2024, he was reappointed as head coach of the Ghana national football team and Joseph Laumann, John Painstil, and Fatawu Dauda as assistant coaches to support the team's technical setup. He temporarily took charge of the March international window for the games against Nigeria and Uganda on 22 and 26 March 2024, respectively at the Stade de Marrakech in Morocco before taking over permanently in May 2024. Addo led the Black Stars to victory against Mali by 2–1 on 6 June 2024, making the victory the first away win since 2022. He again led the Black Stars to victory against Central African Republic by 4–3 on 10 June 2024.

===== 2026 World Cup qualification =====
In October 2025, under Otto Addo's management, Ghana secured qualification for the 2026 FIFA World Cup after a 1–0 victory over Comoros in Accra. This made Addo the first coach in Ghanaian history to guide the Black Stars to two separate World Cups. However, some individuals including Felix Kwakye Ofosu, the Minister in Charge of Government Communications has referred to such calls as misplaced and unfortunate.

Ghana finished the qualifiers unbeaten atop Group I with 25 points. After qualification, Addo urged Ghanaian fans to keep expectations realistic heading into the World Cup. The Sports Minister, Kofi Adams, praised Addo's role in the turnaround and credited him for navigating the team through pressure periods.

On 31 March 2026, Ghana announced that they had parted ways with Addo effective immediately, following a 2–1 defeat to Germany in a friendly match.

===== Technical study group =====
Otto Addo, having been parted ways with Ghana, has been appointed by FIFA to the technical study group of FIFA 2026 World Cup taking place in USA, Canada. The role will require him to undertake rigorous analysis of matches, focusing on tactical trends, playing structures, transitions, and set pieces.

== Personal life ==
In September 2024, Addo was involved in a car crash along with John Paintsil and Fatau Dauda after their vehicle was damaged as it avoided a head-on collision with a pick-up truck that veered into their lane. The Ghana Football Association issued a statement shortly after the incident confirming that all three individuals were in stable condition.

He currently lives in Meerbusch.

== Managerial statistics ==
As of match played 30 March 2026

| Team | From | To | Record | | | | |
| Team | From | To | G | W | D | L | Win % |
|---|---|---|---|---|---|---|---|
| Ghana | 9 February 2022 | 3 December 2022 | 12 | 4 | 3 | 5 | 33.33 |
| Ghana | 15 March 2024 | 31 March 2026 | 22 | 8 | 5 | 9 | 36.36 |
| Total | | | 34 | 12 | 8 | 14 | 35.29 |

== Honours ==
Borussia Dortmund

- Bundesliga: 2001–02
- UEFA Cup runner-up: 2001–02
- DFB-Ligapokal runner-up: 2003
