= Mugurel Drăgănescu =

Romanian football referee

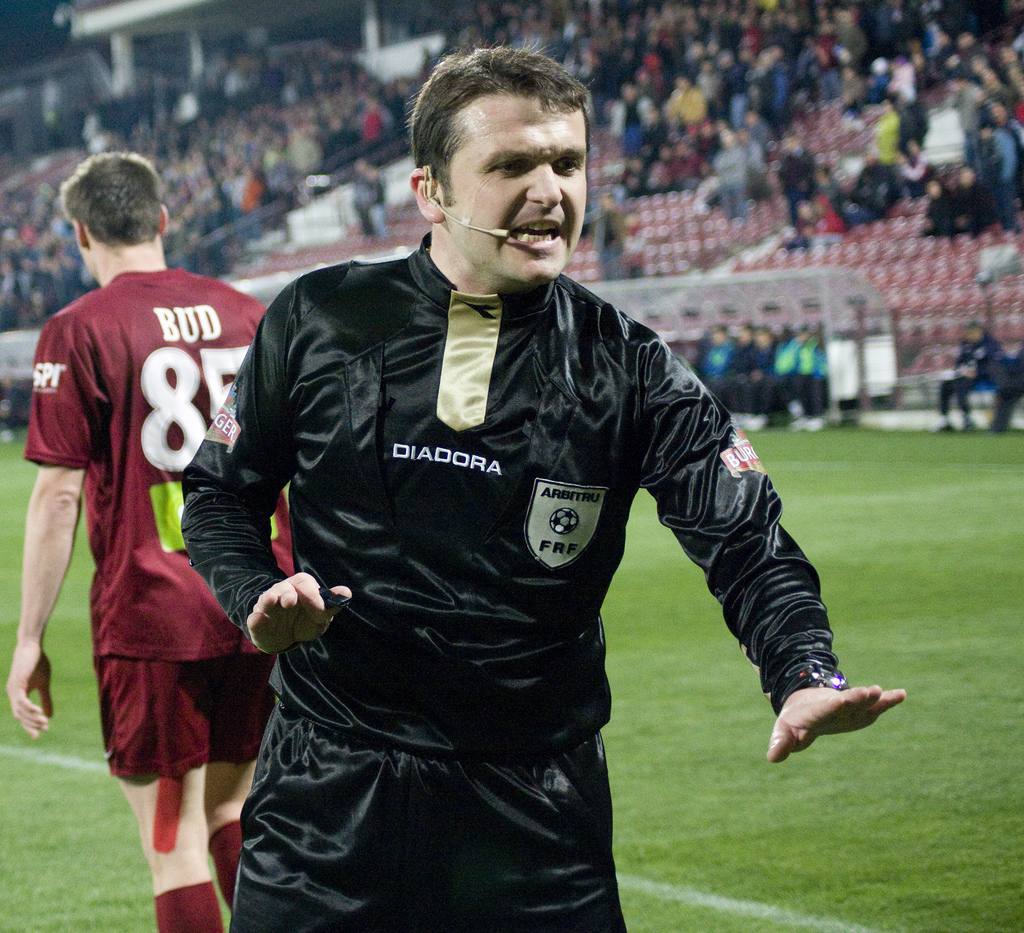
- Born: 10 May 1976 (age 50); Sinaia, Romania
- Other occupation: Forestry engineer

Domestic
Years	League	Role
2001–2013	Liga III	Referee
2002–2013	Liga II	Referee
2006–2013	Liga I	Referee

International
Years	League	Role
2009–2013	FIFA listed	Referee

Mugurel Drăgănescu (born 10 May 1976, in Sinaia) is a Romanian former football referee. Drăgănescu was born in Sinaia, but lives in Breaza. His first Liga III match was on 28 April 2001, Metalurgistul Cugir - Minerul Moldova Nouă 1-0, his first Liga II match was 17 months later, a match between Bucovina Suceava and Rulmentul Alexandria, which ended 3-1. On 12 April 2006 Drăgănescu made his Liga I debut in a match between FC Vaslui and Argeș Pitești, ended with the score of 3-0. Drăgănescu was also a FIFA listed referee from 2009 until his retirement in 2013. His basic profession is as a forestry engineer, being the director of the Câmpina Association of Hunting and Fishing Athletes. From 2014 he is also a football matches observer.
