= Henri Traoré =

Burkinabé footballer

Personal information
- Full name: Henri Traoré
- Date of birth: 13 April 1983 (age 43)
- Place of birth: Bobo-Dioulasso, Republic of Upper Volta
- Height: 1.81 m (5 ft 11 in)
- Position: Defender

Team information
- Current team: Ashanti Gold

Senior career*
| Years | Team | Apps | (Gls) |
| 2005–2009 | Étoile Filante de Ouagadougou | | |
| 2009–2010 | AS SONABEL | | |
| 2010–2015 | Ashanti Gold | | |

International career^{‡}
| 2005–2013 | Burkina Faso | 3 | (0) |
Medal record
Representing Burkina Faso
Africa Cup of Nations
| Runner-up | 2013 South Africa |
- * Club domestic league appearances and goals as of 19 January 2013 ‡ National team caps and goals as of 19 January 2013

Henri Traoré (born 13 April 1983) is a Burkinabé international footballer, who last played for Ghanaian team Ashanti Gold, as a defender.

== Club career ==
Traoré has played in Burkina Faso and Ghana for Étoile Filante de Ouagadougou, AS SONABEL and Ashanti Gold, respectively.

== International career ==
He made his international debut for Burkina Faso in 2005.
