= Martin Živný =

Czech footballer

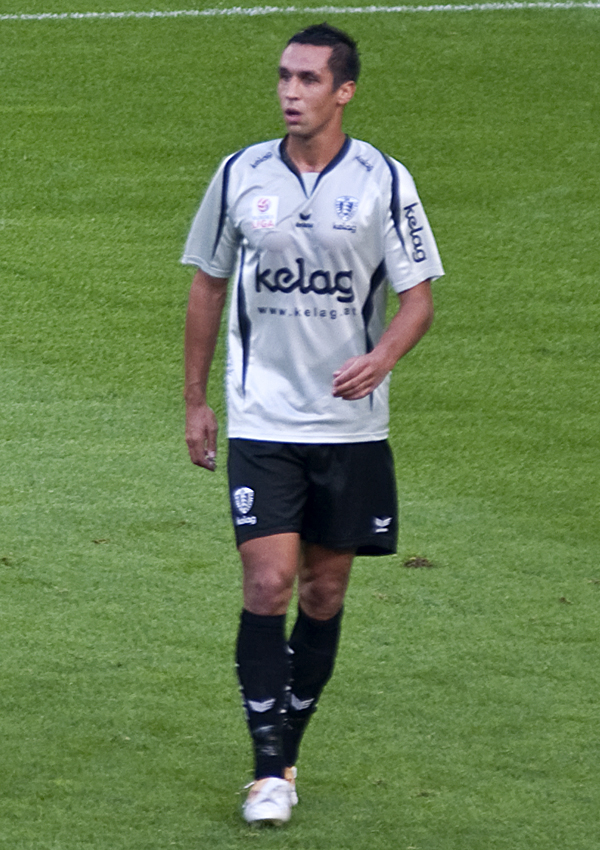

Personal information
- Full name: Martin Živný
- Date of birth: 20 March 1981 (age 45)
- Place of birth: Brno, Czechoslovakia
- Height: 1.91 m (6 ft 3 in)
- Position: Defender

Youth career
- 1987–2000: Zbrojovka Brno

Senior career*
Years	Team	Apps	(Gls)
2000–2009	Zbrojovka Brno	117	(5)
2006	→ Kunovice (loan)	12	(1)
2007	→ Vítkovice (loan)	5	(0)
2009–2010	Austria Kärnten	17	(0)
2010	Dinamo București	1	(0)
2010–2011	Hartberg	37	(4)
2012–2015	Slovan Rosice (Note: The statistics for the 2013–14 and 2015–15 seasons are available.)	22	(3)
Total		211	(13)

International career
2002–2003	Czech Republic U-21	9	(0)
- * Club domestic league appearances and goals as of 5 September 2023

Martin Živný (born 20 March 1981) is a Czech former professional footballer who played as a defender. His biggest achievement is winning the 2002 UEFA European Under-21 Championship with the Czech Republic U-21 side alongside co-national Milan Baroš.

== Honours ==
Czech Republic U21

- UEFA European Under-21 Football Championship: 2002
