= Gualberto Campos =

Venezuelan footballer (born 1981)

Personal information
- Full name: Gualberto José Campos Reyes
- Date of birth: April 24, 1981 (age 45)
- Place of birth: Ciudad Guayana, Venezuela
- Height: 1.80 m (5 ft 11 in)
- Position: Midfielder

Senior career*
Years	Team	Apps	(Gls)
2004–2005	Mineros de Guayana	5	(0)
2005–2006	UCLA	40	(8)
2006–2007	Iberoamericano	9	(1)
2007	Portuguesa	16	(6)
2007–2008	Caracas	5	(1)
2008	Dinamo București	2	(0)
2009	Deportivo Lara	12	(2)
2010	Aragua	14	(2)
2011	Carabobo	13	(2)
2011–2012	Tucanes de Amazonas	31	(4)
- * Club domestic league appearances and goals as of March 26, 2010

Gualberto José Campos Reyes (born April 24, 1981) is a retired Venezuelan footballer.
