= Tom Bertram (footballer) =

German footballer (born 1987)

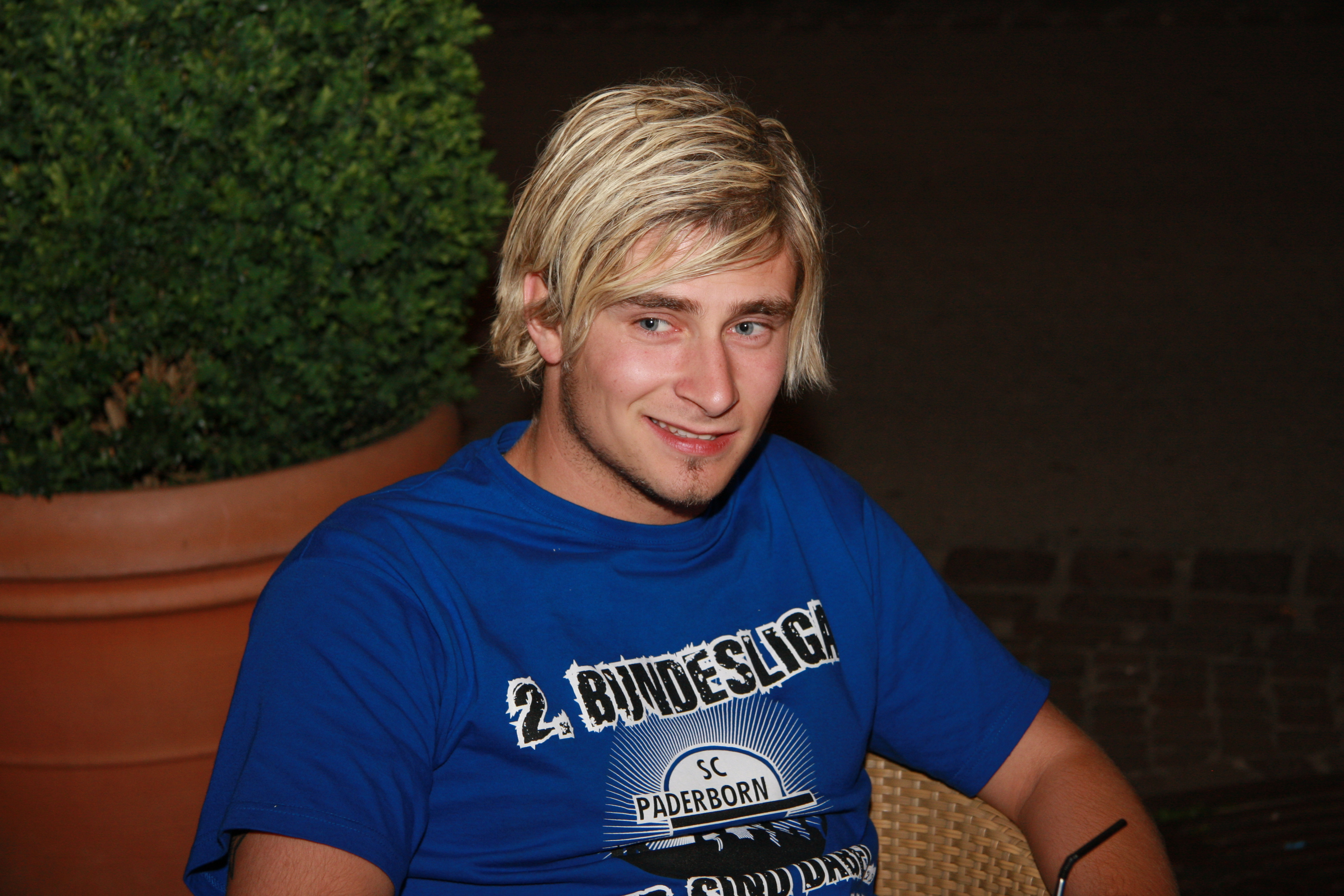
- Bertram on 2 June 2009

Personal information
- Full name: Tom Bertram
- Date of birth: 30 March 1987 (age 39)
- Place of birth: Halle (Saale), East Germany
- Height: 1.85 m (6 ft 1 in)
- Position: Defender

Youth career
- –2005: Rot-Weiß Erfurt

Senior career*
Years	Team	Apps	(Gls)
2005–2007	Rot-Weiß Erfurt	64	(3)
2007–2009	Greuther Fürth	7	(0)
2009	Greuther Fürth II	15	(1)
2009–2010	SC Paderborn	1	(0)
2010–2013	Rot-Weiß Erfurt	60	(1)
Total		147	(5)

International career
2007	Germany U-21	3	(0)

Managerial career
- 2013–2015: FC Rot-Weiß Erfurt U-19 (assistant)
- * Club domestic league appearances and goals

Tom Bertram (born 30 March 1987 in Halle (Saale)) is a German former professional footballer who played as a defender. He has worked as announcer since 2014 for FC Rot-Weiß Erfurt.
