= Osvaldo Miranda (footballer) =

Argentine footballer (born 1984)

Personal information
- Full name: Osvaldo Noé Miranda
- Date of birth: 24 June 1984 (age 42)
- Place of birth: Luján de Cuyo, Argentina
- Height: 1.90 m (6 ft 3 in)
- Position: Forward

Senior career*
Years	Team	Apps	(Gls)
2002–2003	Luján de Cuyo	18	(2)
2003–2004	Godoy Cruz	29	(7)
2004–2005	Almagro	32	(9)
2005	Racing Club	5	(0)
2005–2006	Independiente	13	(1)
2006–2007	Godoy Cruz	24	(2)
2007	Gimnasia de Jujuy	19	(4)
2008–2010	Dinamo Bucureşti	28	(4)
2009–2010	→ Astra Ploieşti (loan)	9	(2)
2010	→ Belgrano (loan)	18	(1)
2010–2011	Astra Ploieşti	39	(1)
2012–2013	Ferro Carril Oeste	53	(13)
2013–2014	Argentinos Juniors	8	(1)
2014	Sportivo Belgrano	13	(1)
2014–2015	Gimnasia de Jujuy	38	(6)
2016–2017	Central Córdoba	56	(8)
2017–2018	Los Andes	9	(0)
2018	Crucero del Norte	21	(5)
2018–2019	AA Estudiantes	5	(1)
2019	Deportivo Maipú	9	(0)
- * Club domestic league appearances and goals as of 01:11, 20 July 2019 (UTC)

Osvaldo Noé Miranda (born 24 June 1984 in Luján de Cuyo, Mendoza) is an Argentine football striker.

== Career ==
Miranda started his career in 2002 at Luján de Cuyo in the 3rd division interior. In 2003, he joined Godoy Cruz in the 2nd division.

In 2004, he got his chance to play in the Primera, with Almagro he excelled in his first season, finishing as the 2nd top scorer in the Apertura 2004 tournaments. One of the highlights of his time at Almagro was scoring in a 2–0 win over Club Atlético River Plate at the Monumental. Despite his goals Almagro were relegated at the end of the 2004–2005 season.

Miranda had short spells with Racing Club and Independiente before returning to Mendoza Province to rejoin Godoy Cruz in 2006. After Godoy Cruz were relegated from the Primera at the end of the 2006-2007 season Miranda moved to Gimnasia y Esgrima de Jujuy.

On February 7, 2008, Miranda signed a three-year contract with Romanian football team FC Dinamo Bucureşti. The reported transfer fee is $1.5 million. On 26 August 2010 Miranda signed with Astra Ploieşti.

In June 2019, Miranda joined Deportivo Maipú. He left the club at the end of the year.
