= James Kwesi Appiah =

Ghanaian football player and coach (born 1960)

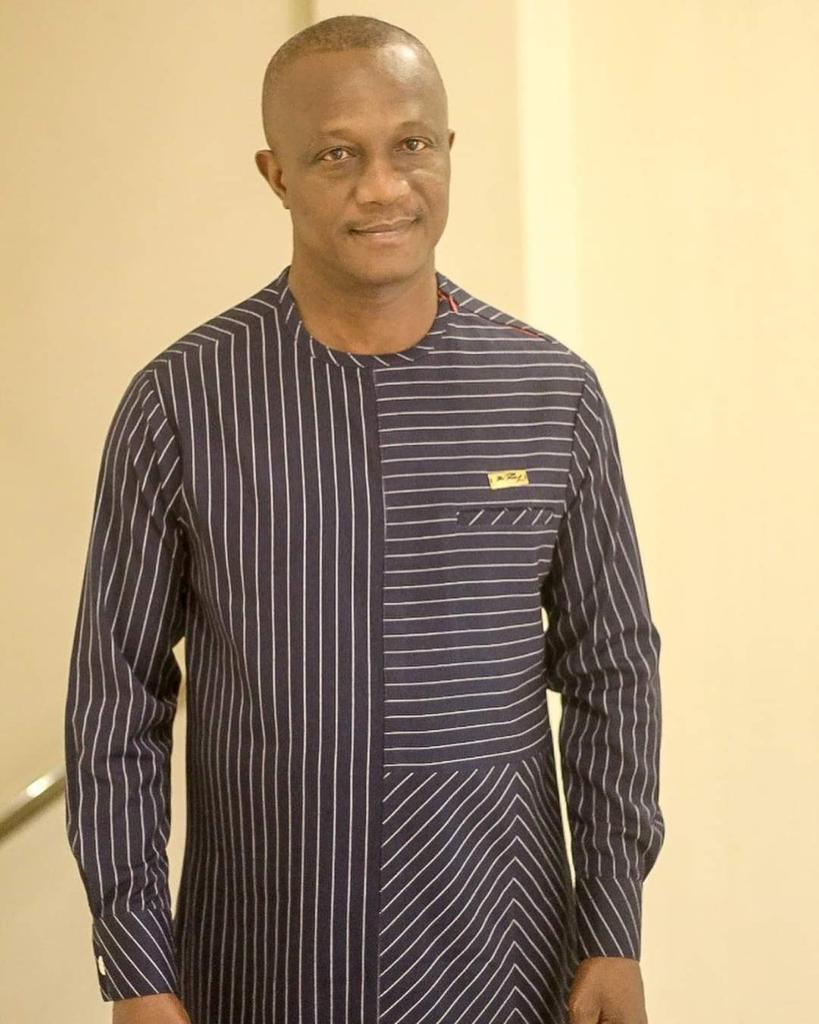

Personal information
- Full name: James Kwesi Appiah
- Date of birth: 30 June 1960 (age 66)
- Place of birth: Kumasi, Ashanti, Ghana
- Position: Left back

Team information
- Current team: Sudan (head coach)

Senior career*
Years	Team	Apps	(Gls)
1982–1983	Prestea Mine Stars		
1983–1993	Asante Kotoko		

International career
1982–1992	Ghana		

Managerial career
- 1992–1995: Asante Kotoko (assistant)
- 1995–1996: Asante Kotoko
- 2007–2012: Ghana (assistant)
- 2011: Ghana U23
- 2012–2014: Ghana
- 2014–2017: Khartoum
- 2017–2020: Ghana
- 2021–2023: Kenpong Football Academy
- 2023–: Sudan
- * Club domestic league appearances and goals

James Kwesi Appiah (born 30 June 1960), also known as Akwasi Appiah, is a Ghanaian football coach and former player who played as a left back who is the head coach of Sudan national football team.

== Early life and education ==
Appiah was born on 30 June 1960 in Kumasi. He attended Opoku Ware School (OWASS) for his secondary school education.

== Club career ==
Appiah, a left back, played club football for Prestea Mine Stars between 1982 and 1983, before joining Asante Kotoko, playing for them between 1983 and 1993.

== International career ==
Appiah played for the Ghana national team between 1982 and 1992, appearing in two FIFA World Cup qualifying matches; he also captained the team. Appiah was part of the 1982 squad that won the 1982 African Cup of Nations.

== Coaching career ==
Between 1992 and 1995 Appiah served as the assistant coach for his former club Asante Kotoko including deputizing under Malik Jabir. He was subsequently promoted to serve in the role of head coach from 1995 to 1996. He served as a coach as part of the technical team of Fred Osam-Duodu when he served as Head coach of the Ghana national team from 2000 to 2001.

He has received technical training from English clubs Manchester City, and Liverpool.

James Kwesi Appiah was Ghana's assistant coach between 2007 and 2012 serving under Claude Le Roy and Milovan Rajevac.

Appiah was coach of Ghana U23 as they won the 2011 All-Africa Games.

He was appointed as the Head coach of the Ghana national team in April 2012, describing himself as "the underdog" in the process. His Ghana team qualified for the 2014 World Cup in Brazil, making him the first black African coach to take the country to the World Cup. He was given a new two-year contract in May 2014. After the country exited the World Cup in the group stages, Appiah defended his team. He left his position as Ghana manager by mutual consent in September 2014.

He became manager of Sudanese club Al Khartoum in December 2014. During his first season, he led the team to a fourth place finish and qualification to the Confederation Cup. The following season, he led the club in attaining the highest points tally per season in the club's history, 65 points, however they did not qualify for the CAF Confederation Cup.

In April 2017 he was re-appointed as the coach of the Ghana national team, replacing former Chelsea manager Avram Grant. He was sacked in January 2020.

In July 2021, he was appointed as the head coach of Kenpong Football Academy.

In January 2023 he was linked with the manager's job at Tanzanian club Simba SC. He also applied to become Ghana national team manager.

In September 2023, Appiah became the head coach of the Sudan national football team, whilst still working as Technical Director of Asante Kotoko in a joint role. He led the team to qualification to the 2025 Africa Cup of Nations.

== Honours ==
=== Player ===
Asante Kotoko

- Ghana Premier League: 1983, 1986, 1987, 1988–89, 1990–91, 1991–92, 1992–93
- Ghanaian FA Cup: 1984, 1989–90
- African Cup of Champions Clubs: 1983

Ghana

- African Cup of Nations: 1982

=== Manager ===
Ghana U23

- All-Africa Games: 2011

Individual

- Millennium Excellence Awards – Sports Category: 2021
- SWAG Sports Personality of the Year: 2014
- SWAG Coach of the Year: 2012, 2025
