= Fred Osam-Duodu =

Ghanaian football manager and coach

Personal information
- Date of birth: 4 June 1938
- Date of death: 4 October 2016 (aged 78)
- Place of death: Accra, Ghana

Managerial career
- Years: Team
- 1978–81: Ghana
- 1988–89: Ghana
- 1993: Ghana U20
- 1993: Ghana
- 2000: Ghana
- 2001–02: Ghana
- 2005: The Gambia U17
- 2007: Ghana U17

Frederick Osam-Duodu (4 June 1938 – 4 October 2016) was a Ghanaian coach and a FIFA Instructor. Osam Duodu served as Ghana national football team.

== Career ==
A former Ghana national football team coach, he won the 1978 Africa Cup of Nations, the 1993 African U-20 Cup of Nations and a silver medal at the 1993 FIFA World Youth Championship. He was also Ghana's coach during the 2002 African Cup of Nations, held in Mali.

In 2005, he led Gambia's Under 17 to win the African Youth Cup, qualifying them for a FIFA Youth Tournament for the first time. He was later the coach of Ghana's Under-17 team, known as the "Black Starlets" that qualified for the African Championship in Togo held in March 2007.

On 15 January 2007, the Ghana coach was handed the job of leading Africa's All-Star U-17 team to play a European U-17 All-Star select side in February 2007 in a UEFA–CAF Meridian Cup. Osam-Duodu was assisted by Egypt's coach Shakwi Gharib Bayoumi.

During his latter years, he served as technical director and General Secretary of the Ghana Football Association as well as being an instructor for the CAF and FIFA.

== Personal life ==
He died at a hospital in Accra on 4 October 2016.

== Honours ==
=== As manager ===
Ghana

- Africa Cup of Nations: 1978

Ghana U20

- African U-20 Championship: 1993
- FIFA World Youth Championship runner up: 1993

Gambia U17

- African U-17 Championship: 2005
