= Anoh Attoukora =

Ivorian footballer

Personal information
- Full name: Anoh Apollinaire Attoukora Sfondo
- Date of birth: 20 June 1989 (age 37)
- Place of birth: Adjamé, Ivory Coast
- Height: 1.70 m (5 ft 7 in)
- Position: Midfielder

Team information
- Current team: Aviron Bayonnais

Youth career
- Stella Club d'Adjamé

Senior career*
Years	Team	Apps	(Gls)
2007	Stella Club d'Adjamé	20	(9)
2007–2010	Dinamo II București	32	(4)
2007–2010	Dinamo București	1	(0)
2010–2015	Pau	84	(4)
2015–2017	Trélissac	38	(1)
2017–	Aviron Bayonnais	123	(2)

International career
	Ivory Coast U17	5	(0)
	Ivory Coast U21	6	(1)
- * Club domestic league appearances and goals as of 5 June 2024

Anoh Apollinaire Attoukora Sfondo (born 20 June 1989) is an Ivorian professional footballer who plays as a midfielder for Aviron Bayonnais.

== Career ==
Attoukora was born in Adjamé and he was brought in Romania at Dinamo București in 2007 by coach Mircea Rednic where he played one Liga I game for the first team.
