= Angola at the FIFA World Cup =

International football delegation

Angola have appeared in the finals of the FIFA World Cup on one occasion in 2006, since becoming a member of FIFA in 1980. They were eliminated in the Group Stage after a defeat by Portugal and two draws with Mexico and Iran. In their last match, Flávio scored Angola's first and only goal of the tournament.

== Records ==
FIFA World Cup record										FIFA World Cup qualification record					
Year	Round	Position	Pld	W	D*	L	GF	GA	Squad	Pld	W	D	L	GF	GA
(Uruguay) 1930	Part of Portugal									Part of Portugal					
(Italy) 1934	Part of Portugal									Part of Portugal					
(France) 1938	Part of Portugal									Part of Portugal					
(Brazil) 1950	Part of Portugal									Part of Portugal					
(Switzerland) 1954	Part of Portugal									Part of Portugal					
(Sweden) 1958	Part of Portugal									Part of Portugal					
(Chile) 1962	Part of Portugal									Part of Portugal					
(England) 1966	Part of Portugal									Part of Portugal					
(Mexico) 1970	Part of Portugal									Part of Portugal					
(West Germany) 1974	Part of Portugal									Part of Portugal					
(Argentina) 1978	Not a FIFA member									Not a FIFA member					
(Spain) 1982	Did not enter									Declined participation					
(Mexico) 1986	Did not qualify									4	1	1	2	3	4
(Italy) 1990	Did not qualify									8	2	3	3	8	8
(United States) 1994	Did not qualify									5	1	2	2	3	4
(France) 1998	Did not qualify									8	4	4	0	12	5
(South Korea) (Japan) 2002	Did not qualify									10	5	4	1	19	10
(Germany) 2006	Group stage	23rd	3	0	2	1	1	2	Squad	12	7	3	2	15	9
(South Africa) 2010	Did not qualify									6	3	1	2	11	8
(Brazil) 2014	Did not qualify									6	1	4	1	7	5
(Russia) 2018	Did not qualify									2	0	0	2	1	4
(Qatar) 2022	Did not qualify									8	3	2	3	9	9
(Canada) (Mexico) (United States) 2026	Did not qualify									10	2	6	2	9	8
(Morocco) (Portugal) (Spain) 2030	To be determined									To be determined					
(Saudi Arabia) 2034	To be determined									To be determined					
Total	Group stage	1/12	3	0	2	1	1	2	—	79	29	30	20	97	74

== By Match ==
Year	Round	Opponents	Score	Scorers
(Germany) 2006	Group D	Portugal	0–1	
(Germany) 2006	Group D	Mexico	0–0	
(Germany) 2006	Group D	Iran	1–1	Flávio Amado

== Angola at Germany 2006 ==
Group D of the 2006 FIFA World Cup

Team	Pld	W	D	L	GF	GA	GD	Pts
Portugal	3	3	0	0	5	1	+4	9
Mexico	3	1	1	1	4	3	+1	4
Angola	3	0	2	1	1	2	−1	2
Iran	3	0	1	2	2	6	−4	1

=== Angola vs Portugal ===
11 June 2006
21:00

Angola	0–1	Portugal
	(Report)	Pauleta 4'

FIFA WM Stadion Köln, Cologne
Attendance: 45,000
Referee: Jorge Larrionda (Uruguay)

GK	1	João Ricardo
RB	20	Locó	(yellow card) 45+3'
CB	3	Jamba	(yellow card) 28'
CB	5	Kali
LB	21	Delgado
RM	17	Zé Kalanga		(substituted off) 70'
CM	8	André Macanga	(yellow card) 52'
CM	7	Figueiredo		(substituted off) 80'
CM	11	Mateus
LM	14	Mendonça
CF	10	Akwá (c)		(substituted off) 60'
Substitutions:
FW	9	Pedro Mantorras		(substituted on) 60'
MF	13	Édson		(substituted on) 70'
MF	6	Miloy		(substituted on) 80'
Manager:
(Angola) Luís Oliveira Gonçalves

GK	1	Ricardo
RB	13	Miguel
CB	5	Fernando Meira
CB	16	Ricardo Carvalho
LB	14	Nuno Valente	(yellow card) 79'
CM	8	Petit		(substituted off) 72'
CM	19	Tiago		(substituted off) 83'
AM	7	Luís Figo (c)
RF	17	Cristiano Ronaldo	(yellow card) 26'	(substituted off) 60'
CF	9	Pauleta
LF	11	Simão
Substitutions:
MF	6	Costinha		(substituted on) 60'
MF	18	Maniche		(substituted on) 72'
MF	10	Hugo Viana		(substituted on) 83'
Manager:
(Brazil) Luiz Felipe Scolari

Man of the Match:
(Portugal) Luís Figo

Assistant referees:
Wálter Rial (Uruguay)
Pablo Fandino (Uruguay)
Fourth official:
Kevin Stott (United States)
Fifth official:
Chris Strickland (United States)

=== Mexico vs Angola ===
16 June 2006
21:00

Mexico	0–0	Angola
	(Report)

FIFA WM Stadion Hannover, Hanover
Attendance: 43,000
Referee: Shamsul Maidin (Singapore)

GK	1	Oswaldo Sánchez
CB	4	Rafael Márquez (c)
CB	5	Ricardo Osorio
CB	3	Carlos Salcido
RM	16	Mario Méndez
CM	8	Pável Pardo
CM	6	Gerardo Torrado
LM	14	Gonzalo Pineda	(yellow card) 59'	(substituted off) 78'
AM	7	Sinha		(substituted off) 52'
CF	19	Omar Bravo
CF	10	Guillermo Franco		(substituted off) 74'
Substitutions:
MF	21	Jesus Arellano		(substituted on) 52'
FW	17	Francisco Fonseca		(substituted on) 74'
MF	11	Ramón Morales		(substituted on) 78'
Manager:
(Argentina) Ricardo Lavolpe

GK	1	João Ricardo	(yellow card) 86'
RB	20	Locó
CB	3	Jamba
CB	5	Kali
LB	21	Luís Delgado	(yellow card) 13'
DM	8	André Macanga	(yellow card) 44' (yellow-red card) 79'
RM	17	Zé Kalanga	(yellow card) 50'	(substituted off) 83'
CM	11	Mateus		(substituted off) 68'
CM	7	Figueiredo		(substituted off) 73'
LM	14	Mendonça
CF	10	Akwá (c)
Substitutions:
MF	9	Pedro Mantorras		(substituted on) 68'
DF	15	Rui Marques		(substituted on) 73'
FW	6	Miloy		(substituted on) 83'
Manager:
(Angola) Luís Oliveira Gonçalves

Man of the Match:
(Angola) João Ricardo

Assistant referees:
Carlos Chandía (Chile)
Rodrigo González (Chile)
Fourth official:
Prachya Permpanich (Thailand)
Fifth official:
Eisa Ghoulum (United Arab Emirates)

=== Iran vs Angola ===
Flávio got the opening goal of the game and Angola's only goal of the tournament when he headed home after a cross from the right in the 60th minute.

21 June 2006
16:00

Iran	1–1	Angola
Bakhtiarizadeh 75'	(Report)	Flávio 60'

Zentralstadion, Leipzig
Attendance: 38,000
Referee: Mark Shield (Australia)

GK	1	Ebrahim Mirzapour
RB	13	Hossein Kaebi		(substituted off) 67'
CB	3	Sohrab Bakhtiarizadeh
CB	5	Rahman Rezaei
LB	20	Mohammad Nosrati		(substituted off) 13'
CM	14	Andranik Teymourian	(yellow card) 55'
CM	7	Ferydoon Zandi	(yellow card) 90+1'
RW	2	Mehdi Mahdavikia
AM	9	Vahid Hashemian		(substituted off) 39'
LW	21	Mehrzad Madanchi	(yellow card) 37'
CF	10	Ali Daei (c)
Substitutions:
MF	23	Masoud Shojaei		(substituted on) 13'
FW	11	Rasoul Khatibi		(substituted on) 39'
FW	15	Arash Borhani		(substituted on) 67'
Manager:
(Croatia) Branko Ivanković

GK	1	João Ricardo
RB	20	Loco	(yellow card) 22'
CB	3	Jamba
CB	5	Kali
LB	21	Delgado
CM	7	Figueiredo		(substituted off) 73'
CM	6	Miloy
RW	17	Zé Kalanga	(yellow card) 67'
AM	11	Mateus		(substituted off) 23'
LW	14	Mendonça	(yellow card) 46'
CF	10	Akwá (c)		(substituted off) 51'
Substitutions:
FW	18	Love		(substituted on) 23'
FW	16	Flávio		(substituted on) 51'
DF	15	Rui Marques		(substituted on) 73'
Manager:
(Angola) Luís Oliveira Gonçalves

Man of the Match:
(Angola) Zé Kalanga

Assistant referees:
Nathan Gibson (Australia)
Ben Wilson (Australia)
Fourth official:
Carlos Eugênio Simon (Brazil)
Fifth official:
Aristeu Tavares (Brazil)

== Record players ==
No less than eleven players have been fielded on all three occasions, making them record World Cup players for their country:

Rank	Player	Matches
1	Akwá	3
1	Luís Delgado	3
1	Paulo Figueiredo	3
1	Jamba	3
1	João Ricardo	3
1	Kali	3
1	Locó	3
1	Mateus	3
1	António Mendonça	3
1	Miloy	3
1	Zé Kalanga	3

== Top Goalscorers ==
The only goal for Angola at a FIFA World Cup, so far, was scored by Flávio Amado in their 1–1 draw against Iran in Leipzig on June 21st 2006.

Player	Goals	2006
Flávio Amado	1	1
Total	1	1

== See also ==
- African nations at the FIFA World Cup
