= 2006 FIFA World Cup Group D =

Football tournament

Group D of the 2006 FIFA World Cup began on 11 June and completed on 21 June 2006. Portugal won the group, and advanced to the round of 16 (for the first time since 1966), along with Mexico. Angola and Iran failed to advance.

== Standings ==
Pos	Team	Pld	W	D	L	GF	GA	GD	Pts	Qualification
1	Portugal	3	3	0	0	5	1	+4	9	Advance to knockout stage
2	Mexico	3	1	1	1	4	3	+1	4	Advance to knockout stage
3	Angola	3	0	2	1	1	2	−1	2	
4	Iran	3	0	1	2	2	6	−4	1	

Source: FIFA
Rules for classification: Tie-breaking criteria
- Portugal advanced to play the Netherlands (runners-up of Group C) in the round of 16.
- Mexico advanced to play Argentina (winners of Group C) in the round of 16.

== Matches ==
All times local (CEST/UTC+2)

=== Mexico vs Iran ===
11 June 2006
18:00

Mexico	3–1	Iran
Bravo 28', 76'; Sinha 79'		Golmohammadi 36'

Frankenstadion, Nuremberg
Attendance: 41,000
Referee: Roberto Rosetti (Italy)

Mexico	Iran

GK	1	Oswaldo Sánchez
RB	16	Mario Méndez
CB	4	Rafael Márquez (c)
CB	5	Ricardo Osorio
LB	3	Carlos Salcido	(yellow card) 90+1'
RM	8	Pável Pardo
CM	6	Gerardo Torrado	(yellow card) 18'	(substituted off) 46'
LM	14	Gonzalo Pineda
RF	19	Omar Bravo
CF	9	Jared Borgetti		(substituted off) 52'
LF	10	Guillermo Franco		(substituted off) 46'
Substitutions:
MF	7	Sinha		(substituted on) 46'
MF	23	Luis Ernesto Pérez		(substituted on) 46'
FW	17	Francisco Fonseca		(substituted on) 52'
Manager:
(Argentina) Ricardo La Volpe

GK	1	Ebrahim Mirzapour
RB	13	Hossein Kaebi
CB	4	Yahya Golmohammadi
CB	5	Rahman Rezaei
LB	20	Mohammad Nosrati		(substituted off) 81'
RM	2	Mehdi Mahdavikia
CM	6	Javad Nekounam	(yellow card) 55'
CM	14	Andranik Teymourian
LM	8	Ali Karimi		(substituted off) 62'
CF	10	Ali Daei (c)
CF	9	Vahid Hashemian
Substitutions:
MF	21	Mehrzad Madanchi		(substituted on) 62'
FW	15	Arash Borhani		(substituted on) 81'
Manager:
(Croatia) Branko Ivanković

Man of the Match:
Omar Bravo (Mexico)

Assistant referees:
Cristiano Copelli (Italy)
Alessandro Stagnoli (Italy)
Fourth official:
Jerome Damon (South Africa)
Fifth official:
Enock Molefe (South Africa)

=== Angola vs Portugal ===
11 June 2006
21:00

Angola	0–1	Portugal
		Pauleta 4'

RheinEnergieStadion, Cologne
Attendance: 45,000
Referee: Jorge Larrionda (Uruguay)

Angola	Portugal

GK	1	João Ricardo
RB	20	Locó	(yellow card) 45+3'
CB	3	Jamba	(yellow card) 28'
CB	5	Kali
LB	21	Luís Delgado
RM	17	Zé Kalanga		(substituted off) 70'
CM	8	André Macanga	(yellow card) 52'
CM	11	Mateus
CM	7	Paulo Figueiredo		(substituted off) 80'
LM	14	António Mendonça
CF	10	Akwá (c)		(substituted off) 60'
Substitutions:
FW	9	Mantorras		(substituted on) 60'
MF	13	Édson		(substituted on) 70'
MF	6	Miloy		(substituted on) 80'
Manager:
Luís Oliveira Gonçalves

GK	1	Ricardo
RB	13	Miguel
CB	5	Fernando Meira
CB	16	Ricardo Carvalho
LB	14	Nuno Valente	(yellow card) 79'
CM	19	Tiago		(substituted off) 83'
CM	8	Petit		(substituted off) 72'
RW	17	Cristiano Ronaldo	(yellow card) 26'	(substituted off) 60'
AM	7	Luís Figo (c)
LW	11	Simão
CF	9	Pauleta
Substitutions:
MF	6	Costinha		(substituted on) 60'
MF	18	Maniche		(substituted on) 72'
MF	10	Hugo Viana		(substituted on) 83'
Manager:
(Brazil) Luiz Felipe Scolari

Man of the Match:
Luís Figo (Portugal)

Assistant referees:
Wálter Rial (Uruguay)
Pablo Fandino (Uruguay)
Fourth official:
Kevin Stott (United States)
Fifth official:
Chris Strickland (United States)

=== Mexico vs Angola ===
16 June 2006
21:00

Mexico	0–0	Angola

Niedersachsenstadion, Hanover
Attendance: 43,000
Referee: Shamsul Maidin (Singapore)

Mexico	Angola

GK	1	Oswaldo Sánchez
CB	4	Rafael Márquez (c)
CB	5	Ricardo Osorio
CB	3	Carlos Salcido
RM	16	Mario Méndez
CM	6	Gerardo Torrado
CM	7	Sinha		(substituted off) 52'
CM	8	Pável Pardo
LM	14	Gonzalo Pineda	(yellow card) 59'	(substituted off) 78'
CF	19	Omar Bravo
CF	10	Guillermo Franco		(substituted off) 74'
Substitutions:
FW	21	Jesús Arellano		(substituted on) 52'
FW	17	Francisco Fonseca		(substituted on) 74'
FW	11	Ramón Morales		(substituted on) 78'
Manager:
(Argentina) Ricardo La Volpe

GK	1	João Ricardo	(yellow card) 86'
RB	20	Locó
CB	3	Jamba
CB	5	Kali
LB	21	Luís Delgado	(yellow card) 13'
RM	8	André Macanga	(yellow card) 44' (yellow-red card) 79'
CM	17	Zé Kalanga	(yellow card) 50'	(substituted off) 83'
CM	7	Paulo Figueiredo		(substituted off) 73'
CM	11	Mateus		(substituted off) 68'
LM	14	António Mendonça
CF	10	Akwá (c)
Substitutions:
FW	9	Mantorras		(substituted on) 68'
DF	15	Rui Marques		(substituted on) 73'
MF	6	Miloy		(substituted on) 83'
Manager:
Luís Oliveira Gonçalves

Man of the Match:
João Ricardo (Angola)

Assistant referees:
Prachya Permpanich (Thailand)
Eisa Gholoum (United Arab Emirates)
Fourth official:
Carlos Chandía (Chile)
Fifth official:
Rodrigo González (Chile)

=== Portugal vs Iran ===
17 June 2006
15:00

Portugal	2–0	Iran
Deco 63'; Ronaldo 80' (pen.)

Waldstadion, Frankfurt
Attendance: 48,000
Referee: Éric Poulat (France)

Portugal	Iran

GK	1	Ricardo
RB	13	Miguel
CB	5	Fernando Meira
CB	16	Ricardo Carvalho
LB	14	Nuno Valente
CM	6	Costinha	(yellow card) 61'
CM	18	Maniche		(substituted off) 66'
RW	7	Luís Figo (c)		(substituted off) 88'
AM	20	Deco	(yellow card) 48'	(substituted off) 80'
LW	17	Cristiano Ronaldo
CF	9	Pauleta	(yellow card) 45+1'
Substitutions:
MF	8	Petit		(substituted on) 66'
MF	19	Tiago		(substituted on) 80'
FW	11	Simão		(substituted on) 88'
Manager:
(Brazil) Luiz Felipe Scolari

GK	1	Ebrahim Mirzapour
RB	13	Hossein Kaebi	(yellow card) 73'
CB	4	Yahya Golmohammadi (c)	(yellow card) 88'	(substituted off) 88'
CB	5	Rahman Rezaei
LB	20	Mohammad Nosrati
RM	2	Mehdi Mahdavikia
CM	14	Andranik Teymourian
CM	6	Javad Nekounam	(yellow card) 20'
LM	21	Mehrzad Madanchi	(yellow card) 32'	(substituted off) 66'
AM	8	Ali Karimi		(substituted off) 65'
CF	9	Vahid Hashemian
Substitutions:
MF	7	Ferydoon Zandi		(substituted on) 65'
FW	11	Rasoul Khatibi		(substituted on) 66'
DF	3	Sohrab Bakhtiarizadeh		(substituted on) 88'
Manager:
(Croatia) Branko Ivanković

Man of the Match:
Deco (Portugal)

Assistant referees:
Lionel Dagorne (France)
Vincent Texier (France)
Fourth official:
Mohamed Guezzaz (Morocco)
Fifth official:
Brahim Djezzar (Algeria)

=== Portugal vs Mexico ===
21 June 2006
16:00

Portugal	2–1	Mexico
Maniche 6'; Simão 24' (pen.)		Fonseca 29'

Arena AufSchalke, Gelsenkirchen
Attendance: 52,000
Referee: Ľuboš Micheľ (Slovakia)

Portugal	Mexico

GK	1	Ricardo
RB	13	Miguel	(yellow card) 26'	(substituted off) 61'
CB	5	Fernando Meira
CB	16	Ricardo Carvalho
LB	3	Marco Caneira
CM	19	Tiago
CM	8	Petit
CM	18	Maniche	(yellow card) 69'
RW	7	Luís Figo (c)		(substituted off) 80'
LW	11	Simão
CF	23	Hélder Postiga		(substituted off) 69'
Substitutions:
DF	2	Paulo Ferreira		(substituted on) 61'
FW	21	Nuno Gomes	(yellow card) 90+1'	(substituted on) 69'
FW	15	Luís Boa Morte	(yellow card) 88'	(substituted on) 80'
Manager:
(Brazil) Luiz Felipe Scolari

GK	1	Oswaldo Sánchez
CB	22	Francisco Javier Rodríguez	(yellow card) 22'	(substituted off) 46'
CB	5	Ricardo Osorio
CB	3	Carlos Salcido
RM	16	Mario Méndez		(substituted off) 80'
CM	8	Pável Pardo
CM	4	Rafael Márquez (c)	(yellow card) 65'
CM	23	Luis Ernesto Pérez	(yellow card) 27' (yellow-red card) 61'
LM	14	Gonzalo Pineda		(substituted off) 69'
CF	17	Francisco Fonseca
CF	19	Omar Bravo
Substitutions:
MF	7	Sinha	(yellow card) 87'	(substituted on) 46'
MF	15	José Antonio Castro		(substituted on) 69'
FW	10	Guillermo Franco		(substituted on) 80'
Manager:
(Argentina) Ricardo La Volpe

Man of the Match:
Francisco Fonseca (Mexico)

Assistant referees:
Roman Slyško (Slovakia)
Martin Balko (Slovakia)
Fourth official:
Essam Abd El Fatah (Egypt)
Fifth official:
Mamadou N'Doye (Senegal)

=== Iran vs Angola ===
21 June 2006
16:00

Iran	1–1	Angola
Bakhtiarizadeh 75'		Flávio 60'

Zentralstadion, Leipzig
Attendance: 38,000
Referee: Mark Shield (Australia)

Iran	Angola

GK	1	Ebrahim Mirzapour
RB	13	Hossein Kaebi		(substituted off) 67'
CB	5	Rahman Rezaei
CB	3	Sohrab Bakhtiarizadeh
LB	20	Mohammad Nosrati		(substituted off) 13'
RM	2	Mehdi Mahdavikia
CM	14	Andranik Teymourian	(yellow card) 55'
CM	7	Ferydoon Zandi	(yellow card) 90+1'
LM	21	Mehrzad Madanchi	(yellow card) 37'
CF	9	Vahid Hashemian		(substituted off) 39'
CF	10	Ali Daei (c)
Substitutions:
MF	23	Masoud Shojaei		(substituted on) 13'
FW	11	Rasoul Khatibi		(substituted on) 39'
FW	15	Arash Borhani		(substituted on) 67'
Manager:
(Croatia) Branko Ivanković

GK	1	João Ricardo
RB	20	Locó	(yellow card) 22'
CB	3	Jamba
CB	5	Kali
LB	21	Luís Delgado
RM	17	Zé Kalanga	(yellow card) 67'
CM	6	Miloy
CM	7	Paulo Figueiredo		(substituted off) 73'
CM	11	Mateus		(substituted off) 23'
LM	14	António Mendonça	(yellow card) 45+1'
CF	10	Akwá (c)		(substituted off) 51'
Substitutions:
FW	18	Love		(substituted on) 23'
FW	16	Flávio		(substituted on) 51'
DF	15	Rui Marques		(substituted on) 73'
Manager:
Luís Oliveira Gonçalves

Man of the Match:
Zé Kalanga (Angola)

Assistant referees:
Nathan Gibson (Australia)
Ben Wilson (Australia)
Fourth official:
Carlos Simon (Brazil)
Fifth official:
Aristeu Tavares (Brazil)

== See also ==
- Angola at the FIFA World Cup
- Iran at the FIFA World Cup
- Mexico at the FIFA World Cup
- Portugal at the FIFA World Cup
