= List of Angola international footballers =

The Angola national football team has represented Angola in international association football since 1976. The Angolan Football Federation (FAF) was founded in 1979 and became a member of the Fédération Internationale de Football Association (FIFA) one year later. However, the team had already played its first international match on 8 February 1976, suffering a 3–2 defeat to Congo in a friendly game.

== Players ==
Key
**Bold**	Played for the national team

As of 9 June 2026

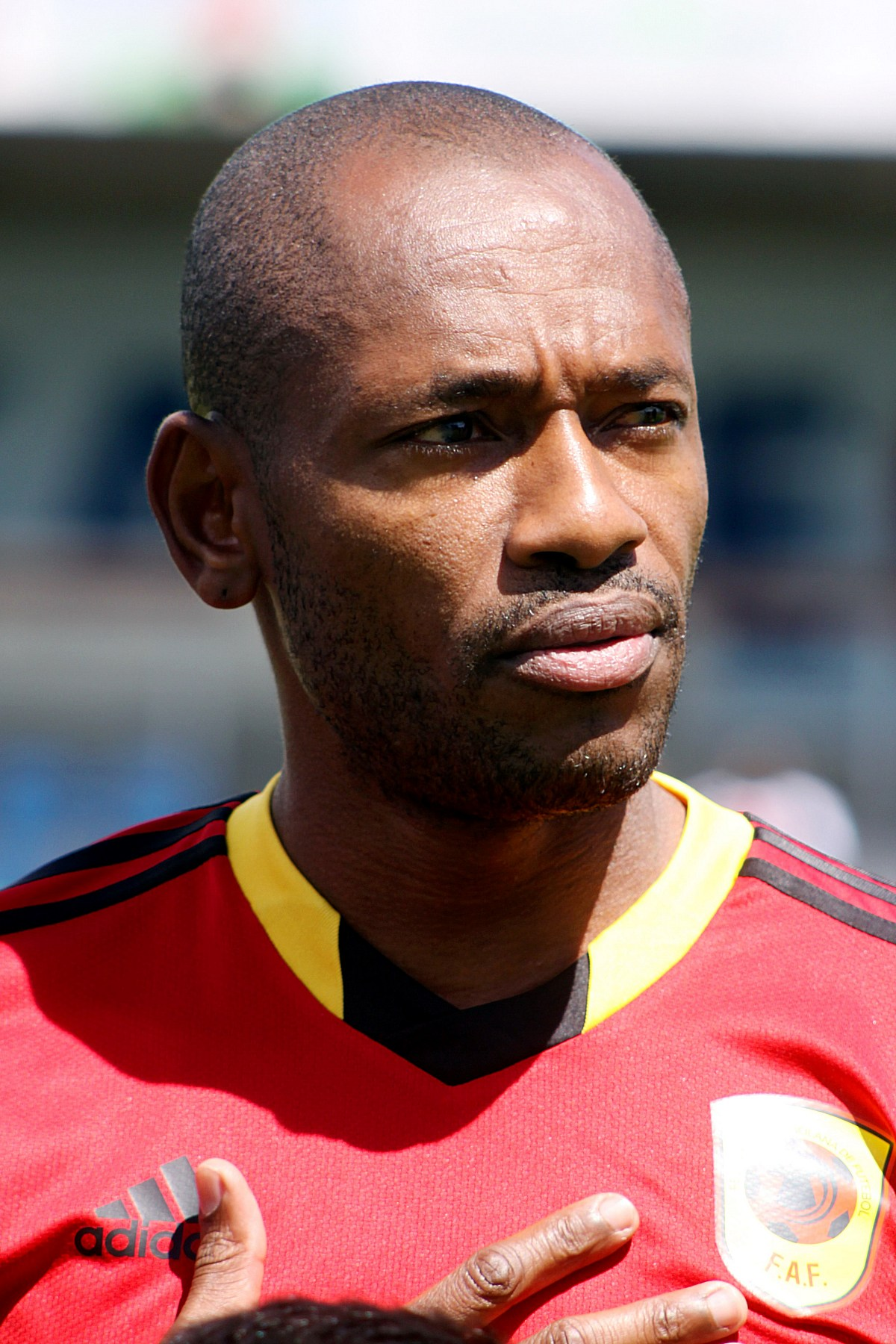
Gilberto gained 88 caps between 1999 and 2015.

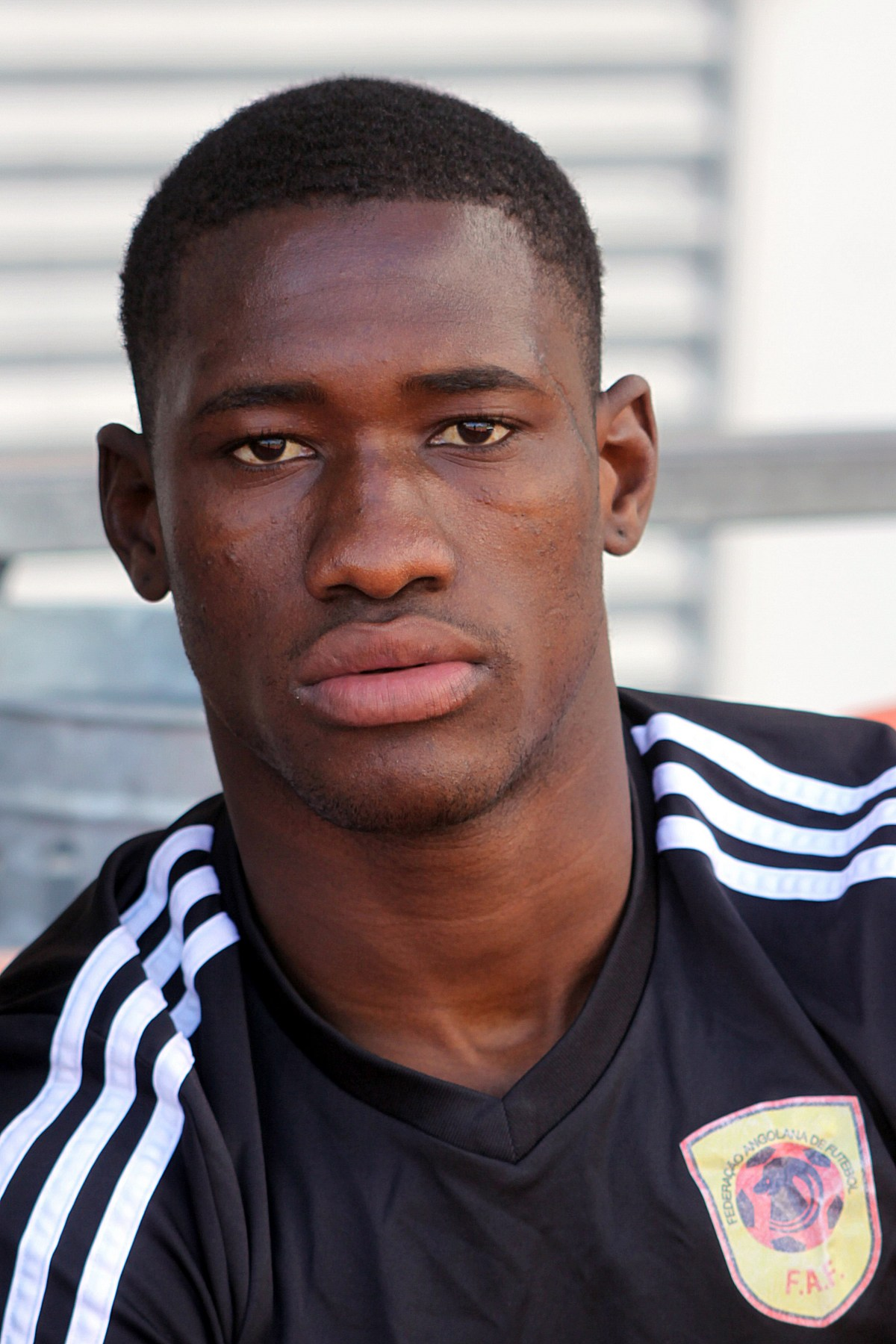
Bastos has represented his country 59 times.

Angola national team footballers with at least 40 appearances
No.	Name	Caps	Goals	Year of debut	Year of last match	Ref.
1	Flávio Amado	91	34	2000	2012	
2	Gilberto	88	10	1999	2015	
3	Love Cabungula	85	16	2001	2017	
4	Kali	81	1	2001	2012	
5	Akwá	78	39	1995	2006	
6	Yamba Asha	77	1	2000	2009	
7	André Macanga	72	2	1999	2012	
7	**Mateus Galiano da Costa**	72	14	2006	2021	
9	Fredy	69	4	2014	2025	
10	Vata	65	20	1987	1993	
10	Show	65	2	2017	present	
12	Job	64	7	2007	2018	
13	Jonathan Buatu	62	2	2014	present	
14	António Neto	59	1	1992	2001	
14	**Bastos Quissanga**	59	2	2011	present	
14	Ary Papel	59	10	2012	present	
17	Jamba	58	1	1998	2009	
18	Gelson Dala	57	23	2015	present	
19	Lamá	56	0	2003	2013	
19	Zé Kalanga	56	6	2004	2010	
21	António Mendonça	54	6	1999	2009	
21	Manucho	54	23	2006	2017	
23	Neblú	53	0	2013	present	
24	Paulão	52	19	1993	2001	
25	Dani Massunguna	51	1	2010	2019	
26	Djalma Campos	50	8	2008	2019	
27	Kialonda Gaspar	49	1	2021	present	
28	Jesus	48	18	1978	1992	
29	Joni	45	5	1994	2001	
30	Chara	44	0	2006	2014	
30	Ndunguidi	44	9	1978	1991	
32	Amaro	42	2	2008	2017	
33	Bodunha	40	3	1992	2004	
33	Hélder Vicente	40	1	1994	2002	
33	Locó	40	2	2003	2009	
33	Quinzinho	40	9	1994	2001	

== Top scorers ==
Rank	Player	Goals	Caps	Ratio	Career
1	Akwá	38	78	0.49	1995–2006
2	Flávio	34	91	0.37	2000–2012
3	Gelson Dala	23	57	0.4	2015–present
3	Manucho	23	54	0.43	2006-2017
5	Vata	20	65	0.32	1985–1993
6	Paulão	19	52	0.37	1993–2001
7	Jesus	18	48	0.38	1978–1992
8	Depú	16	21	0.76	2021–present
9	Love Cabungula	16	85	0.19	2001-2017
10	Mabululu	15	49	0.31	2013–present
11	Mateus Galiano	14	70	0.2	2006–2021
12	Gilberto	10	89	0.11	1999-2015
12	Ary Papel	10	59	0.17	2012–present
14	Zini Salvador	9	34	0.26	2021–present
14	Quinzinho	9	40	0.23	1994–2001
14	Daniel Ndunguidi	9	44	0.2	1978-1990

== Statistics of AFCON ==
In total, Angola has competed in 10 African Cup of Nations in 1996, 1998, 2006, 2008, 2010, 2012, 2013, 2019, 2023 and 2025. Their first game was against Egypt, and the first player to score was Quinzinho in a 2-1 defeat, where Angola scored 4 goals in that edition. The first victory was against Togo, in 2006, where Flávio Amado scored 2 goals in that game (Angola won 3-2). The biggest victory came in 2023 against Namibia (3-0) this victory was Angola's first in a knockout stage of a AFCON (this game was in the round of 16), and the biggest defeat was against Côte d'Ivoire in 1998 (5-2). Angola played 34 games, winning 7, drawing 15 and losing 12, scoring 41 goals and conceding 46. Their highest scoring AFCON was in 2023 with 9 goals in 5 matches.The best participation it was in 2008, 2010 and 2023 (that was played at the beginning of 2024) where it reached quarter-finals of the rest of group stage and the best scored is Manucho Gonçalves with 9 goals in 14 matches.

Top scorers Angola AFCON

Rank	Player	Goals scored	Matches played	Goals per match	Tournament(s)
1	Manucho Gonçalves	9	14	0.64	4 (2008, 2010, 2012, 2013)
2	Flávio Amado	7	12	0.5833	4 (2006, 2008, 2010, 2012)
3	Gelson Dala	5	11	0.454	3 (2019, 2023, 2025)
3	Quinzinho	3	6	0.5	2 (1996, 1998)

More games at AFCON

A total of 122 players took the field for Angola in AFCON, and those with the most appearance were Manucho Gonçalves and Gilberto with 14 caps. The players who was more the AFCON was Manucho (in 2008, 2010, 2012 and 2013), Gilbeto (in 2008, 2010, 2012 and 2013), Flávio Amado (in 2006, 2008, 2010 and 2013), Lamá (in 2008, 2010, 2012 and 2013), Love Cabungula (in 2006, 2008, 2010 and 2012), Kali (in 2006, 2008, 2010 and 2012) and Mateus Galiano (in 2008, 2012, 2013 and 2019) with 4 participations. The ones who could tie this record if Angola qualifiers for next AFCON ( in 2027) are Neblú (2013, 2023 and 2025), Mabululu (2019, 2023 and 2025), Gelson Dala (2019, 2023 and 2025) and Show (2019, 2023 and 2025).
