= African nations at the FIFA World Cup =

International football delegations

Association football is the most popular sport in nearly every African country, and fourteen members of the Confederation of African Football (CAF) have competed at the sport's biggest event – the FIFA World Cup. The highest ranked result in the World Cup for an African team is fourth place in the 2022 tournament by Morocco. CAF countries have hosted the finals once.

== Overview ==
	1930 (Uruguay) (13)	1934 (Italy) (16)	1938 (France) (15)	1950 (Brazil) (13)	1954 (Switzerland) (16)	1958 (Sweden) (16)	1962 (Chile) (16)	1966 (England) (16)	1970 (Mexico) (16)	1974 (West Germany) (16)	1978 (Argentina) (16)	1982 (Spain) (24)	1986 (Mexico) (24)	1990 (Italy) (24)	1994 (United States) (24)	1998 (France) (32)	2002 (South Korea) (Japan) (32)	2006 (Germany) (32)	2010 (South Africa) (32)	2014 (Brazil) (32)	2018 (Russia) (32)	2022 (Qatar) (32)	2026 (Canada) (Mexico) (United States) (48)	2030 (Morocco) (Portugal) (Spain) (48)	2034 (Saudi Arabia) (48)	Total
Teams	0	(Egypt)	0	0	0	0	0	0	(Morocco)	(Zaire)	(Tunisia)	(Cameroon) (Algeria)	(Morocco) (Algeria)	(Cameroon) (Egypt)	(Cameroon) (Morocco) (Nigeria)	(Cameroon) (Morocco) (Tunisia) (Nigeria) (South Africa)	(Cameroon) (Tunisia) (Nigeria) (South Africa) (Senegal)	(Tunisia) (Ghana) (Ivory Coast) (Angola) (Togo)	(Cameroon) (Nigeria) (Algeria) (Ghana) (South Africa) (Ivory Coast)	(Cameroon) (Nigeria) (Algeria) (Ghana) (Ivory Coast)	(Morocco) (Tunisia) (Nigeria) (Egypt) (Senegal)	(Cameroon) (Morocco) (Tunisia) (Ghana) (Senegal)	(Morocco) (Tunisia) (Algeria) (Ghana) (Egypt) (South Africa) (Senegal) (Ivory Coast) (Democratic Republic of the Congo) (Cape Verde)	(Morocco)		59
Top 32	—	—	—	—	—	—	—	—	—	—	—	—	—	—	—	—	—	—	—	—	—	—	9			9
Top 16	—	—	—	—	—	—	—	—	—	—	—	0 (Note: In 1982, the second round featured 12 teams of which 4 advanced to the semi-finals.)	1	1	1	1	1	1	1	2	0	2	2			13
Top 8	—	0	0	—	0	0	0	0	0	0	0	0	0	1	0	0	1	0	1	0	0	1	1			5
Top 4	0	0	0	0	0	0	0	0	0	0	0	0	0	0	0	0	0	0	0	0	0	1	0			1
Top 2	0	0	0	0	0	0	0	0	0	0	0	0	0	0	0	0	0	0	0	0	0	0	0			0
1st																										0
2nd																										0
3rd																										0
4th																						(Morocco)				1

Country	No.	Years	Best result
**Cameroon**	8	1982, **1990**, 1994, 1998, 2002, 2010, 2014, 2022	QF
**Morocco**	7	1970, 1986, 1994, 1998, 2018, **2022**, 2026	4th
**Tunisia**	7	1978, 1998, 2002, 2006, 2018, 2022, 2026	GS
**Nigeria**	6	**1994**, **1998**, 2002, 2010, **2014**, 2018	R16
**Algeria**	5	1982, 1986, 2010, **2014**, 2026	R16
**Ghana**	5	2006, **2010**, 2014, 2022, 2026	QF
**Egypt**	4	1934, 1990, 2018, **2026**	R16
**South Africa**	4	1998, 2002, 2010, **2026**	R32
**Senegal**	4	**2002**, 2018, 2022, 2026	QF
**Ivory Coast**	4	2006, 2010, 2014, **2026**	R32
**DR Congo** (Note: The Democratic Republic of the Congo competed as Zaire in 1974.)	2	1974, **2026**	R32
**Angola**	1	2006	GS
**Togo**	1	2006	GS
**Cape Verde**	1	**2026**	R32

- **Bold** indicates year(s) of best finish

== Results ==
=== Tournament standings ===
Team	Champions	Final	Semi-finals	Quarter-finals (Note: Knockout round of 8: 1934–1938, 1954–1970, and 1986–present; second group stage, top 8: 1974–1978)	Round of 16 (Note: Second group stage, top 12: 1982; knockout round of 16: 1986–present)	Round of 32 (Note: Knockout round of 32: 2026–present)
Morocco	0	0	1	2	3	1
Ghana	0	0	0	1	2	1
Senegal	0	0	0	1	2	1
Cameroon	0	0	0	1	1	0
Nigeria	0	0	0	0	3	0
Algeria	0	0	0	0	1	1
Egypt	0	0	0	0	1	1
Cape Verde	0	0	0	0	0	1
DR Congo	0	0	0	0	0	1
Ivory Coast	0	0	0	0	0	1
South Africa	0	0	0	0	0	1

=== Team results by tournament ===
The team ranking in each tournament is according to FIFA. The rankings, apart from the top four positions (top two in 1930), are not a result of direct competition between the teams; instead, teams eliminated in the same round are ranked by their full results in the tournament.

For each tournament, the number of teams in each finals tournament (in brackets) are shown.

FIFA World Cup results of CAF members
Team	1930 (Uruguay) (13)	1934 (Italy) (16)	1938 (France) (15)	1950 (Brazil) (13)	1954 (Switzerland) (16)	1958 (Sweden) (16)	1962 (Chile) (16)	1966 (England) (16)	1970 (Mexico) (16)	1974 (West Germany) (16)	1978 (Argentina) (16)	1982 (Spain) (24)	1986 (Mexico) (24)	1990 (Italy) (24)	1994 (United States) (24)	1998 (France) (32)	2002 (South Korea) (Japan) (32)	2006 (Germany) (32)	2010 (South Africa) (32)	2014 (Brazil) (32)	2018 (Russia) (32)	2022 (Qatar) (32)	2026 (Canada) (Mexico) (United States) (48)	2030 (Morocco) (Portugal) (Spain) (48)	2034 (Saudi Arabia) (48)	Total	Qual. Comp.
Algeria	—N/a							×	•	•	•	GS1; 13th	GS; 22nd	•	•	•	•	•	GS; 28th	R16; 14th	•	•	R32; 30th	TBD	TBD	5	15
Angola	—N/a												•	•	•	•	•	GS; 23rd	•	•	•	•	•	TBD	TBD	1	11
Cameroon	—N/a							×	•	•	•	GS1; 17th	•	QF; 7th	GS; 22nd	GS; 25th	GS; 20th	•	GS; 31st	GS; 32nd	•	GS; 19th	•	TBD	TBD	8	15
Cape Verde	—N/a																•	•	•	•	•	•	R32; 32nd	TBD	TBD	1	7
DR Congo	—N/a								×	GS1; 16th	×	•	•	•	•	•	•	•	•	•	•	•	R32; 23rd	TBD	TBD	2	13
Egypt (Note: Egypt entered qualifying in 1962 and 1966 as the United Arab Republic, but withdrew before playing matches.)	••	R16; 13th	×		•	×	×	×		•	•	•	•	GS; 20th	•	•	•	•	•	•	GS; 31st	•	R16; 15th	TBD	TBD	4	16
Ghana	—N/a						•	×	•	•	•	×	•	•	•	•	•	R16; 13th	QF; 7th	GS; 25th	•	GS; 24th	R32; 24th	TBD	TBD	5	15
Ivory Coast	—N/a									•	•		•	•	•	•	•	GS; 19th	GS; 17th	GS; 21st	•	•	R32; 19th	TBD	TBD	4	13
Morocco	—N/a						•	×	GS; 14th	•	•	•	R16; 11th	•	GS; 23rd	GS; 18th	•	•	•	•	GS; 27th	4th	QF; T-7th	Q	TBD	8	16
Nigeria	—N/a						•	×	•	•	•	•	•	•	R16; 9th	R16; 12th	GS; 27th	•	GS; 27th	R16; 16th	GS; 21st	•	•	TBD	TBD	6	16
Senegal	—N/a							×	•	•	•	•	•		•	•	QF; 7th	•	•	•	GS; 17th	R16; 10th	R32; 31st	TBD	TBD	4	14
South Africa	—N/a							×	—N/a						•	GS; 24th	GS; 17th	•	GS; 20th	•	•	•	R32; T-25th	TBD	TBD	4	9
Togo	—N/a									•	•	•	×	×	•	•	•	GS; 30th	•	•	•	•	•	TBD	TBD	1	12
Tunisia	—N/a						•	×	•	•	GS1; 9th	•	•	•	•	GS; 26th	GS; 29th	GS; 24th	•	•	GS; 24th	GS; 21st	GS; 47th	TBD	TBD	7	16

Legend

1st	Champions
2nd	Runners-up
3rd	Third place
4th	Fourth place
QF	Quarter-finals (1934–1938, 1954–1970, 1986–present)
R16	Knockout round of 16 (1934–1938, 1986–present)
R32	Knockout round of 32 (2026–present)
GS	Group stage (1930, 1950–1970, 1986–present)
GS1	First group stage (1974–1982)
GS2	Second group stage (1974–1982)

Q	Qualified for upcoming tournament
TBD	To be determined (may still qualify for upcoming tournament)
••	Qualified but withdrew
•	Did not qualify
•×	Withdrew or disqualified during qualification (after playing matches)
×	Withdrew before qualification / Banned / Entry not accepted by FIFA
	Hosts
	Did not enter
—N/a	Not a FIFA member

=== Overall team records ===
As per statistical convention in football, matches decided in extra time are counted as wins and losses, while matches decided by penalty shoot-outs are counted as draws. 3 points per win, 1 point per draw and 0 points per loss.

As of 2026 FIFA World Cup

Team	Part	Pld	W	D	L	GF	GA	GD	Pts
Morocco	7	29	8	9	12	30	33	−3	33
Cameroon	8	26	5	8	13	22	47	−27	23
Ghana	5	19	6	4	9	20	26	−6	22
Senegal	4	16	6	3	7	26	26	0	21
Nigeria	6	21	6	3	12	23	30	−7	21
Ivory Coast	4	13	5	1	7	18	18	0	16
Algeria	5	17	4	4	9	18	28	−10	16
South Africa	4	13	3	5	5	13	20	−7	14
Tunisia	7	21	3	5	13	16	38	−22	14
Egypt	4	12	1	5	6	13	19	−6	8
DR Congo	2	7	1	1	5	5	19	−14	4
Cape Verde	1	4	0	3	1	4	5	−1	3
Angola	1	3	0	2	1	1	2	−1	2
Togo	1	3	0	0	3	1	6	−5	0

Breakdown of successor team records

DR Congo Breakdown
Team	Part	Pld	W	D	L	GF	GA	GD	Pts
Zaire (1974)	1	3	0	0	3	0	14	−14	0
DR Congo (2026–present)	1	4	1	1	2	5	5	0	4

== Appearances ==
=== Ranking of teams by number of appearances ===
Team	Appearances	Record streak	Active streak	Debut	Most recent	Best result
Cameroon	8	4	0	1982	2022	Quarter-finals (1990)
Morocco	7	4	4	1970	2026	Fourth place (2022)
Tunisia	7	3	3	1978	2026	Group stage
Nigeria	6	3	0	1994	2018	Round of 16 (1994, 1998, 2014)
Algeria	5	2	1	1982	2026	Round of 16 (2014)
Ghana	5	3	2	2006	2026	Quarter-finals (2010)
Egypt	4	1	1	1934	2026	Round of 16 (2026)
South Africa	4	2	1	1998	2026	Round of 32 (2026)
Ivory Coast	4	3	1	2006	2026	Round of 32 (2026)
Senegal	4	3	3	2002	2026	Quarter-finals (2002)
DR Congo	2	1	1	1974	2026	Round of 32 (2026)
Angola	1	1	0	2006	2006	Group stage
Togo	1	1	0	2006	2006	Group stage
Cape Verde	1	1	1	2026	2026	Round of 32 (2026)

=== Team debuts ===
Year	Debutants	Total
1934	Egypt	1
1970	Morocco	1
1974	Zaire	1
1978	Tunisia	1
1982	Algeria; Cameroon	2
1994	Nigeria	1
1998	South Africa	1
2002	Senegal	1
2006	Angola; Ghana; Ivory Coast; Togo	4
2026	Cape Verde	1
Total		14

=== Not qualified ===
40 of the 54 active FIFA and CAF members have never qualified for the final tournament.

Country	Number of qualifying attempts	1930 (Uruguay)	1934 (Italy)	1938 (France)	1950 (Brazil)	1954 (Switzerland)	1958 (Sweden)	1962 (Chile)	1966 (England)	1970 (Mexico)	1974 (West Germany)	1978 (Argentina)	1982 (Spain)	1986 (Mexico)	1990 (Italy)	1994 (United States)	1998 (France)	2002 (South Korea) (Japan)	2006 (Germany)	2010 (South Africa)	2014 (Brazil)	2018 (Russia)	2022 (Qatar)	2026 (Canada) (Mexico) (United States)	2030 (Morocco) (Portugal) (Spain)	2034 (Saudi Arabia)
Zambia	15	—N/a								•	•	•	•	•	•	•	•	•	•	•	•	•	•	•	TBD	TBD
Ethiopia	14	—N/a					×	•	×	•	•	•	•	•		•		•	•	•×	•	•	•	•	TBD	TBD
Guinea	14	—N/a							×	×	•	•	•	•	•	•	•	•×	•	•	•	•	•	•	TBD	TBD
Kenya	14	—N/a									•	•	•	•	•	•	•	•	•	•	•	•	•	•	TBD	TBD
Sudan	14	—N/a					•×	×	×	•	•	×	•	•	•	×	•	•	•	•	•	•	•	•	TBD	TBD
Liberia	12	—N/a							×				•	•	•	•×	•	•	•	•	•	•	•	•	TBD	TBD
Libya	12	—N/a							×	•		•	•×	•	•×	×		•	•	•	•	•	•	•	TBD	TBD
Malawi	12	—N/a										•	•	•	•	×	•	•	•	•	•	•	•	•	TBD	TBD
Sierra Leone	12	—N/a									•	•	•	•		×	•	•	•	•	•	•	•	•	TBD	TBD
Tanzania	12	—N/a									•	×	•	•		•×	•	•	•	•	•	•	•	•	TBD	TBD
Zimbabwe (Note: Entered World Cup qualifying as Rhodesia in 1970)	12	—N/a								•			•	•	•	•	•	•	•	•	•	×	•	•	TBD	TBD
Zimbabwe	12	—N/a							member of AFC				•	•	•	•	•	•	•	•	•	×	•	•	TBD	TBD
Congo (Note: Entered World Cup qualifying as French Congo in 1966)	11	—N/a							×		•	•				•	•	•	•	•	•	•	•	•	TBD	TBD
Madagascar	11	—N/a									×		•	•		•	•	•	•	•	•	•	•	•	TBD	TBD
Uganda	11	—N/a										•	×	•	•	×	•	•	•	•	•	•	•	•	TBD	TBD
Benin (Note: Entered World Cup qualifying as Dahomey in 1974)	10	—N/a									•			•		•		•	•	•	•	•	•	•	TBD	TBD
Burkina Faso (Note: Entered World Cup qualifying as Upper Volta in 1978)	10	—N/a										•			•	×	•	•	•	•	•	•	•	•	TBD	TBD
Gabon	10	—N/a							×		×				•	•	•	•	•	•	•	•	•	•	TBD	TBD
Gambia	10	—N/a											•	•		×	•	•	•	•	•	•	•	•	TBD	TBD
Mozambique	10	—N/a											•		×	•	•	•	•	•	•	•	•	•	TBD	TBD
Lesotho	9	—N/a									•		•	×	×			•	•	•	•	•	•	•	TBD	TBD
Mauritius	9	—N/a									•			•	×		•	•	•	•	×	•	•	•	TBD	TBD
Namibia	9	—N/a														•	•	•	•	•	•	•	•	•	TBD	TBD
Niger	9	—N/a										•	•	×		•	×		•	•	•	•	•	•	TBD	TBD
Eswatini (Note: Entered World Cup qualifying as Swaziland from 1994–2018)	9	—N/a														•	•	•	•	•	•	•	•	•	TBD	TBD
Botswana	8	—N/a														•		•	•	•	•	•	•	•	TBD	TBD
Burundi	8	—N/a														•	•×	×	•	•	•	•	•	•	TBD	TBD
Guinea-Bissau	8	—N/a															•	•	•	•	•	•	•	•	TBD	TBD
Mauritania	8	—N/a								×	×	•	×	×	×	×	•	•	•	•	×	•	•	•	TBD	TBD
Rwanda	8	—N/a													×		•	•	•	•	•	•	•	•	TBD	TBD
Somalia	8	—N/a											•					•	•	•	•	•	•	•	TBD	TBD
Chad	7	—N/a																•	•	•	•	•	•	•	TBD	TBD
Seychelles	7	—N/a																•	•	•	•	•	•	•	TBD	TBD
Equatorial Guinea	7	—N/a																•	•	•	•	•	•	•	TBD	TBD
Mali	7	—N/a							×							×	×	•	•	•	•	•	•	•	TBD	TBD
São Tomé and Príncipe	6	—N/a														×		•	•	×	•	•	•	•	TBD	TBD
Djibouti	6	—N/a																•		•	•	•	•	•	TBD	TBD
Eritrea	5	—N/a				Part of Ethiopia										—N/a		•	•	×	•	•	•	×	TBD	TBD
Central African Republic	5	—N/a										×	×					•	×	×	•	•	•	•	TBD	TBD
Comoros	5	—N/a																		•	•	•	•	•	TBD	TBD
South Sudan	3	Part of Sudan																			—N/a	•	•	•	TBD	TBD

Legend

TBD	To be determined (may still qualify for upcoming tournament)
•	Did not qualify
•×	Withdrew or disqualified during qualification (after playing matches)
×	Withdrew before qualification / Banned / Entry not accepted by FIFA
	Did not enter
—N/a	Not a FIFA member

== Summary of performance ==
This table shows for each world cup the number of countries at the World Cup, the number of entries (#E) from around the world (including any rejections and withdrawals), the number of African entries (#A), how many of those African entries withdrew (#A-) before/during qualification or were rejected by FIFA, the African representatives at the World Cup finals, the number of World Cup Qualifiers each African representative had to play to get to the World Cup (#WCQ), the furthest stage they reached, their results, and their coaches.

Year	Hosts	Size	#E	#A	#A-	African finalists	#WCQ	Stage	Results	Coach
1930	Uruguay	13	13	0	0	-				
1934	Italy	16	32	1	0	Egypt	2	Round of 16	lost 2–4 Hungary	(Scotland) James McRea
1938	France	15	37	1	1	-				
1950	Brazil	13	34	0	0	-				
1954	Switzerland	16	45	1	0	-				
1958	Sweden	16	56	3	3	-				
1962	Chile	16	56	7	2	-				
1966	England	16	74	17	17	Boycott				
1970	Mexico	16	75	14	2	Morocco	10	Group stage	lost 1–2 West Germany, lost 0–3 Peru, drew 1–1 Bulgaria	(Socialist Federal Republic of Yugoslavia) Blagoje Vidinić
1974	West Germany	16	99	24	2	Zaire	10	First round	lost 0–2 Scotland, lost 0–9 Yugoslavia, lost 0–3 Brazil	(Socialist Federal Republic of Yugoslavia) Blagoje Vidinić
1978	Argentina	16	107	26	4	Tunisia	10	First round	won 3–1 Mexico, lost 0–1 Poland, drew 0–0 West Germany	(Tunisia) Abdelmajid Chetali
1982	Spain	24	109	29	4	Algeria	8	First round	won 2–1 West Germany, lost 0–2 Austria, won 3–2 Chile	(Algeria) Mahieddine Khalef (Algeria) Rachid Mekhloufi
1982	Spain	24	109	29	4	Cameroon	8	First round	drew 0–0 Peru, drew 0–0 Poland, drew 1–1 Italy	(France) Jean Vincent
1986	Mexico	24	121	29	3	Algeria	6	Group stage	drew 1–1 Northern Ireland, lost 0–1 Brazil, lost 0–3 Spain	(Algeria) Rabah Saâdane
1986	Mexico	24	121	29	3	Morocco	8	Round of 16	drew 0–0 Poland, drew 0–0 England, won 3–1 Portugal; R16: lost 0–1 West Germany	(Brazil) José Faria
1990	Italy	24	116	26	5	Cameroon	8	Quarter-finals	won 1–0 Argentina, won 2–1 Romania, lost 0–4 Soviet Union; R16: won 2–1 (a.e.t.) Colombia; QF: lost 2–3 (a.e.t.) England	(Soviet Union) Valeri Nepomniachi
1990	Italy	24	116	26	5	Egypt	8	Group stage	drew 1–1 Netherlands, drew 0–0 Republic of Ireland, lost 0–1 England	(Egypt) Mahmoud El-Gohary
1994	United States	24	147	40	12	Cameroon	8	Group stage	drew 2–2 Sweden, lost 0–3 Brazil, lost 1–6 Russia	(France) Henri Michel
1994	United States	24	147	40	12	Morocco	10	Group stage	lost 0–1 Belgium, lost 1–2 Saudi Arabia, lost 1–2 Netherlands	(Morocco) Abdellah Blinda
1994	United States	24	147	40	12	Nigeria	8	Round of 16	won 3–0 Bulgaria, lost 1–2 Argentina, won 2–0 Greece; R16: lost 1–2 (a.e.t.) Italy	(Netherlands) Clemens Westerhof
1998	France	32	174	38	3	Cameroon	6	Group stage	drew 1–1 Austria, lost 0–3 Italy, drew 1–1 Chile	(France) Claude Le Roy
1998	France	32	174	38	3	Morocco	6	Group stage	drew 2–2 Norway, lost 0–3 Brazil, won 3–0 Scotland	(France) Henri Michel
1998	France	32	174	38	3	Nigeria	6	Round of 16	won 3–2 Spain, won 1–0 Bulgaria, lost 1–3 Paraguay; R16: lost 1–4 Denmark	(Federal Republic of Yugoslavia) Bora Milutinovic
1998	France	32	174	38	3	South Africa	8	Group stage	lost 0–3 France, drew 1–1 Denmark, drew 2–2 Saudi Arabia	(France) Philippe Troussier
1998	France	32	174	38	3	Tunisia	8	Group stage	lost 0–2 England, lost 0–1 Colombia, drew 1–1 Romania	(Poland) Henryk Kasperczak
2002	South Korea; Japan	32	199	51	2	Cameroon	10	Group stage	drew 1–1 Republic of Ireland, won 1–0 Saudi Arabia, lost 0–2 Germany	(Germany) Winfried Schäfer
2002	South Korea; Japan	32	199	51	2	Nigeria	10	Group stage	lost 0–1 Argentina, lost 1–2 Sweden, drew 0–0 England	(Nigeria) Festus Onigbinde
2002	South Korea; Japan	32	199	51	2	Senegal	10	Quarter-finals	won 1–0 France, drew 1–1 Denmark, drew 3–3 Uruguay; R16: won 2–1 (a.s.d.e.t.) Sweden; QF: lost 0–1 (a.s.d.e.t.) Turkey	(France) Bruno Metsu
2002	South Korea; Japan	32	199	51	2	South Africa	8	Group stage	drew 2–2 Paraguay, won 1–0 Slovenia, lost 2–3 Spain	(South Africa) Jomo Sono
2002	South Korea; Japan	32	199	51	2	Tunisia	10	Group stage	lost 0–2 Russia, drew 1–1 Belgium, lost 0–2 Japan	(Tunisia) Ammar Souayah
2006	Germany	32	197	51	1	Angola	12	Group stage	lost 0–1 Portugal, drew 0–0 Mexico, drew 1–1 Iran	(Angola) Luís Oliveira Gonçalves
2006	Germany	32	197	51	1	Ivory Coast	10	Group stage	lost 1–2 Argentina, lost 1–2 Netherlands, won 3–2 Serbia and Montenegro	(France) Henri Michel
2006	Germany	32	197	51	1	Ghana	12	Round of 16	lost 0–2 Italy, won 2–0 Czech Republic, won 2–1 United States; R16: lost 0–3 Brazil	(Serbia) Ratomir Dujković
2006	Germany	32	197	51	1	Togo	12	Group stage	lost 1–2 South Korea, lost 0–2 Switzerland, lost 0–2 France	(Germany) Otto Pfister
2006	Germany	32	197	51	1	Tunisia	10	Group stage	drew 2–2 Saudi Arabia, lost 1–3 Spain, lost 0–1 Ukraine	(France) Roger Lemerre
2010	South Africa	32	204	53	4	Algeria	13	Group stage	lost 0–1 Slovenia, drew 0–0 England, lost 0–1 United States	(Algeria) Rabah Saâdane
2010	South Africa	32	204	53	4	Cameroon	12	Group stage	lost 0–1 Japan, lost 1–2 Denmark, lost 1–2 Netherlands	(France) Paul Le Guen
2010	South Africa	32	204	53	4	Ivory Coast	12	Group stage	drew 0–0 Portugal, lost 1–3 Brazil, won 3–0 North Korea	(Sweden) Sven-Göran Eriksson
2010	South Africa	32	204	53	4	Ghana	12	Quarter-finals	won 1–0 Serbia, drew 1–1 Australia, lost 0–1 Germany; R16: won 2–1 (a.e.t.) United States; QF: lost 1–1 (2–4 p) Uruguay	(Serbia) Milovan Rajevac
2010	South Africa	32	204	53	4	Nigeria	12	Group stage	lost 0–1 Argentina, lost 1–2 Greece, drew 2–2 South Korea	(Sweden) Lars Lagerbäck
2010	South Africa	32	204	53	4	South Africa	host	Group stage	drew 1–1 Mexico, lost 0–3 Uruguay, won 2–1 France	(Brazil) Carlos Alberto Parreira
2014	Brazil	32	203	53	1					
2014	Brazil	32	203	53	1	Algeria	8	Round of 16	lost 1–2 Belgium, won 4–2 South Korea, drew 1–1 Russia; R16: lost 1–2 (a.e.t.) Germany	(Bosnia and Herzegovina) Vahid Halilhodžić
2014	Brazil	32	203	53	1	Cameroon	8	Group stage	lost 0–1 Mexico, lost 0–4 Croatia, lost 1–4 Brazil	(Germany) Volker Finke
2014	Brazil	32	203	53	1	Ivory Coast	8	Group stage	won 2–1 Japan, lost 1–2 Colombia, lost 1–2 Greece	(France) Sabri Lamouchi
2014	Brazil	32	203	53	1	Ghana	8	Group stage	lost 1–2 United States, drew 2–2 Germany, lost 1–2 Portugal	(Ghana) James Kwesi Appiah
2014	Brazil	32	203	53	1	Nigeria	8	Round of 16	drew 0–0 Iran, won 1–0 Bosnia and Herzegovina, lost 2–3 Argentina; R16: lost 0–2 France	(Nigeria) Stephen Keshi
2018	Russia	32	210	54	1					
2018	Russia	32	210	54	1	Egypt	8	Group stage	lost 0–1 Uruguay, lost 1–3 Russia, lost 1–2 Saudi Arabia	(Argentina) Héctor Cúper
2018	Russia	32	210	54	1	Morocco	8	Group stage	lost 0–1 Iran, lost 0–1 Portugal, drew 2–2 Spain	(France) Hervé Renard
2018	Russia	32	210	54	1	Nigeria	8	Group stage	lost 0–2 Croatia, won 2–0 Iceland, lost 1–2 Argentina	(Germany) Gernot Rohr
2018	Russia	32	210	54	1	Senegal	8	Group stage	won 2–1 Poland, drew 2–2 Japan, lost 0–1 Colombia	(Senegal) Aliou Cissé
2018	Russia	32	210	54	1	Tunisia	8	Group stage	lost 1–2 England, lost 2–5 Belgium, won 2–1 Panama	(Tunisia) Nabil Maâloul
2022	Qatar	32	206	54	0					
2022	Qatar	32	206	54	0	Cameroon	8	Group stage	lost 0–1 Switzerland, drew 3–3 Serbia, won 1–0 Brazil	(Cameroon) Rigobert Song
2022	Qatar	32	206	54	0	Ghana	8	Group stage	lost 2–3 Portugal, won 3–2 South Korea, lost 0–2 Uruguay	(Ghana) Otto Addo
2022	Qatar	32	206	54	0	Morocco	8	Fourth place	drew 0–0 Croatia, won 2–0 Belgium, won 2–1 Canada; R16: won 0–0 (3–0 p) Spain; QF: won 1–0 Portugal; SF: lost 0–2 France; 3rd: lost 1–2 Croatia	(Morocco) Walid Regragui
2022	Qatar	32	206	54	0	Senegal	8	Round of 16	lost 0–2 Netherlands, won 3–1 Qatar, won 2–1 Ecuador; R16: lost 0–3 England	(Senegal) Aliou Cissé
2022	Qatar	32	206	54	0	Tunisia	8	Group stage	drew 0–0 Denmark, lost 0–1 Australia, won 1–0 France	(Tunisia) Jalel Kadri
2026	Canada; Mexico; United States	48	208	54	1					
2026	Canada; Mexico; United States	48	208	54	1	Algeria	10	Round of 32	lost 0–3 Argentina, won 2–1 Jordan, drew 3–3 Austria; R32: lost 0–2 Switzerland	(Bosnia and Herzegovina) Vladimir Petković
2026	Canada; Mexico; United States	48	208	54	1	Cape Verde	10	Round of 32	drew 0–0 Spain, drew 2–2 Uruguay, drew 0–0 Saudi Arabia; R32: lost 2–3 (a.e.t.) Argentina	(Cape Verde) Bubista
2026	Canada; Mexico; United States	48	208	54	1	DR Congo	13	Round of 32	drew 1–1 Portugal, lost 0–1 Colombia, won 3–1 Uzbekistan; R32: lost 1–2 England	(France) Sébastien Desabre
2026	Canada; Mexico; United States	48	208	54	1	Egypt	10	Round of 16	drew 1–1 Belgium, won 3–1 New Zealand, drew 1–1 Iran; R32: won 1–1 (4–2 p) Australia; R16: lost 2–3 Argentina	(Egypt) Hossam Hassan
2026	Canada; Mexico; United States	48	208	54	1	Ghana	10	Round of 32	won 1–0 Panama, drew 0–0 England, lost 1–2 Croatia; R32: lost 0–1 Colombia	(Portugal) Carlos Queiroz
2026	Canada; Mexico; United States	48	208	54	1	Ivory Coast	10	Round of 32	won 1–0 Ecuador, lost 1–2 Germany, won 2–0 Curaçao; R32: lost 1–2 Norway	(Ivory Coast) Emerse Faé
2026	Canada; Mexico; United States	48	208	54	1	Morocco	8	Quarter-finals	drew 1–1 Brazil, won 1–0 Scotland, won 4–2 Haiti; R32: won 1–1 (3–2 p) Netherlands; R16: won 3–0 Canada; QF: lost 0–2 France	(Morocco) Mohamed Ouahbi
2026	Canada; Mexico; United States	48	208	54	1	Senegal	10	Round of 32	lost 1–3 France, lost 2–3 Norway, won 5–0 Iraq; R32: lost 2–3 (a.e.t.) Belgium	(Senegal) Pape Thiaw
2026	Canada; Mexico; United States	48	208	54	1	South Africa	10	Round of 32	lost 0–2 Mexico, drew 1–1 Czech Republic, won 1–0 South Korea; R32: lost 0–1 Canada	(Belgium) Hugo Broos
2026	Canada; Mexico; United States	48	208	54	1	Tunisia	10	Group stage	lost 1–5 Sweden, lost 0–4 Japan, lost 1–3 Netherlands	(France) Sabri Lamouchi (fired after one match, replaced by (France) Hervé Renard for the final two matches)

== Performance at individual World Cups ==
=== 1930s: Egypt's early appearance ===
The inaugural 1930 FIFA World Cup was the only one without any qualification process. No African teams entered.

The Pharaohs of Egypt were the only African team to apply to feature at the 1934 FIFA World Cup. As there were 32 countries competing for 16 places, FIFA organized the first qualification round. Egypt was placed in a group with Turkey and Palestine, then a British mandate. Turkey withdrew, and Egypt beat Palestine 7–1 in Cairo and 4–1 in Jerusalem to qualify for the World Cup finals. The 1934 FIFA World Cup finals was organized as a straight knock-out. Egypt lost 4–2 to Hungary in Naples with Abdulrahman Fawzi scoring twice to become the first African to score at the World Cup finals. However, a third goal by Fawzi was ruled offside by the Italian referee despite the player having dribbled from the middle of the pitch, and the fourth Hungarian goal involved a scuffle where the Hungarian striker broke the Egyptian goalkeeper's nose with his elbow. The Italian newspapers heavily criticized their referee, but Egypt sailed home and only returned to the World Cup finals 56 years later.

=== 1938–1966: World Cup without Africa ===
Egypt was the only African country to apply to compete at the 1938 FIFA World Cup, but withdrew before playing any matches.

No African countries applied to compete at the 1950 FIFA World Cup.

Egypt was the only African country to apply to compete at the 1954 World Cup. They were placed in a two-team group with Italy, but lost 1–2 in Cairo and 1–5 in Milan, and thus did not qualify for the World Cup.

Egypt, Ethiopia, and Sudan all applied to enter the qualification process for the 1958 FIFA World Cup, but Ethiopia's entry was rejected by FIFA.

Egypt and Sudan competed in an Africa/Asia zone with ten Asian countries for one spot at the World Cup. Egypt progressed to the next round after Cyprus withdrew, but then itself withdrew. Sudan defeated Syria 2–1 on aggregate but eventually withdrew in protest at having to play Israel. (Eventually, the spot originally reserved for Africa and Asia was taken by Wales.)

Seven African countries entered the qualification process for the 1962 FIFA World Cup: Ghana, United Arab Republic (a joint football association by Egypt and Syria, who were politically united between 1958 and 1961), Ethiopia, Morocco, Nigeria, Sudan and Tunisia. Ethiopia entered through the UEFA qualification process, where it was eliminated by Israel, while the rest entered through the CAF qualification process. Both Sudan and U.A.R. withdrew as FIFA would not allow them to rearrange matches to avoid the monsoon season, so the four teams formed two two-team groups. In the first group, Morocco and Tunisia both beat each other 2–1 at home, and then played a third match at a neutral location (Palermo, Italy) which ended in a 1–1 draw after extra time. Since penalty shoot-outs were not used by FIFA till the 1970s, Morocco advanced by drawing lots to eliminate Tunisia. Morocco then eliminated Ghana with a draw and a win to proceed to a UEFA/CAF playoff with Spain. They lost both legs of this playoff, meaning that no African nation made it to the World Cup finals for the fifth time in a row.

Seventeen African countries entered the qualification process for the 1966 FIFA World Cup: Algeria, Cameroon, French Congo, Ethiopia, Gabon, Ghana, Guinea, Liberia, Libya, Mali, Morocco, Nigeria, Senegal, South Africa, Sudan, and Tunisia. FIFA rejected the application of French Congo, and had already suspended South Africa for apartheid, resulting in their disqualification.

FIFA's allocation of only one place to three continents (Africa, Asia, Oceania) was subject to significant criticism, especially given the large increase in applications from newly independent African countries. After FIFA confirmed the allocation, the remaining fifteen African nations withdrew in protest.

=== 1970: Morocco returns Africa to the World Cup ===
Fourteen African countries entered the qualification process for the 1970 World Cup: Algeria, Cameroon, Ethiopia, Ghana, Guinea, Libya, Morocco, Nigeria, Rhodesia, Senegal, Sudan, Tunisia, Zaire, and Zambia. FIFA rejected the applications of Guinea and Zaire. The Atlas Lions of Morocco played ten matches to qualify for the single CAF spot at the World Cup, advancing along the way past Tunisia by virtue of a coin toss.

Rhodesia, having been expelled from CAF for having a white minority government, entered through the Asia/Oceania qualifying group, where they had to play against Australia in Portuguese-held Mozambique (there was a boycott against playing matches in Rhodesia). The first two matches were drawn, thanks in large part to the excellent Rhodesian goalkeeper Robin Jordan, and the desperate Australians hired a Mozambican sangoma to 'curse' him. In the third match, Jordan was taken off injured after a collision with another player, Australia won 3–1, then refused to pay the sangoma, got 'cursed' by the irate man, and were eliminated two weeks later by Israel. Meanwhile, Rhodesia's CAF expulsion was soon followed by a FIFA expulsion, with Zimbabwe readmitted in 1980.

At the 1970 World Cup, Morocco was placed in Group 4 along with West Germany, Peru, and Bulgaria. They lost 1–2 to eventual semi-finalists West Germany, lost 0–3 to Peru, and drew 1–1 with Bulgaria. The two goalscorers were Houmane Jarir (against West Germany) and Maouhoub Ghazouani (against Bulgaria), who were thus the second and third ever African goalscorers at the World Cup. Morocco finished bottom of the group, on goal difference, with one point – the first African point in the World Cup.

=== 1974: Zaire makes an impression ===
24 African countries entered the qualification process for the 1974 FIFA World Cup, with the Leopards of Zaire eventually qualifying quite comfortably, scoring 18 goals and conceding 5 in the ten matches they played to qualify.

At the 1974 FIFA World Cup, Zaire were placed in Group 2 along with Scotland, Yugoslavia (home of Zaire coach and 1970 Morocco coach Blagoje Vidinić), and Brazil. In their first match against Scotland, they impressed with their fast attacking style, and lost just 0–2. Scottish centre-half Jim Holton said after the match "Let's face it, we underestimated them. For fifteen minutes I wondered what the hell was going on, where the devil had this lot come from, playing stuff like that!"

The next opponents Yugoslavia had noted holes in the Zairean defence, and fully exploited them to hammer Zaire 9–0 in a then record win for World Cup finals, with all but three of their outfield players getting on the scoresheet. Zaire striker Mulamba Ndaye, who was sent off for protesting that a goal by the Yugoslavians was offside, said after the match, "The management had made off with our match bonuses, and we'd threatened not to play the game. Frankly we'd lost our morale. We could easily have let in 20 goals."

After the defeat, the Zairean team were told by the country's dictator Mobutu Sese Seko – who had rewarded the players for qualifying with a house and a car each – not to come home if defending champions Brazil beat them 4–0 or worse. Zaire managed to keep Brazil to merely a 0–3 defeat with Zairean defender Mwepu Ilunga receiving a yellow card for interfering with a free kick. Zaire left the tournament without scoring a goal.

=== 1978: Tunisia becomes the first African team to win at the World Cup ===
26 African countries entered the qualification process for 1 spot at the 1978 FIFA World Cup. In comparison, 22 Asia/Oceania countries also competed for 1 spot, while 31 European countries competed for 8.5 spots. Les Aigles de Carthage (The Carthage Eagles) of Tunisia eventually qualified, along the way eliminating Morocco in the first ever penalty shoot-out in World Cup qualification history. This was a major change for Tunisia, who had been eliminated by Morocco quite literally by chance on three previous occasions in the 1960s.

Tunisia were placed in Group 2 with West Germany, Poland, and Mexico. After Zaire's fate in 1974, they were not expected to do well. They were 1–0 down to Mexico at half-time when their Tunisian coach Abdelmajid Chetali told them that they treated their opponents with too much respect and that they could still win the game if they tackled hard and imposed their belief and self-confidence. Buoyed by the pep talk, the North Africans scored three times in the second half to win 3–1 and become the first African team to win a match at the World Cup. They lost their next match to Poland 1–0, missing several chances, and held West Germany to a goalless draw. While this was not enough to progress to the next round, African football pride had been restored.

=== 1982: Algeria wins twice but eliminated ===
This was the first World Cup with 24 teams, and Africa's representation was doubled. So 29 African countries competed for 2 spots in World Cup qualification. In comparison, 21 Asian nations also competed for 2 spots, but 33 European nations competed for 13 spots. 1978 finalists Tunisia were eliminated in the first round by Nigeria on penalties. Four series of knockout rounds were played, with the final two spots going down to Nigeria vs Algeria, and Morocco vs Cameroon. Both Les Fennecs (the Desert Foxes) of Algeria and Les Lions Indomptables (The Indomitable Lions) of Cameroon won 2–0 away and 2–1 at home and qualified for the World Cup for the first time.

Cameroon were placed in Group 1, where they surprised everyone by remaining undefeated. They drew 0–0 with Peru, 0–0 with Poland, and 1–1 with Italy. Grégoire Mbida scored Cameroon's first World Cup finals goal. Italy had also drawn its three matches, so also had a goal difference of 0, but had scored two goals to Cameroon's one, so Cameroon were eliminated. This was especially painful because in their opening match against Peru, Cameroon striker Roger Milla had a goal wrongly disallowed for offside.

Algeria were placed in Group 2 with West Germany, Austria, and Chile. The Africans produced a major upset in the first match, beating West Germany 2–1 with goals by Rabah Madjer and Lakhdar Belloumi. They lost their second match 0–2 to Austria, then produced another surprise by beating Chile 3–2. The day after the Algeria vs Chile match, West Germany and Austria played the final group match in Gijón knowing that a 1–0 or 2–0 win for West Germany would result in both European teams qualifying at the expense of Algeria on goal difference. West Germany scored after ten minutes, and then both teams appeared to pass the ball aimlessly around for the remaining 80 minutes.

This performance was widely deplored by all observers. The Spanish crowd shouted, "Fuera, fuera!" ("Out, out!") while angry Algerian supporters waved banknotes at the players to suggest that the game was fixed. Even the two sides' fans were disgusted, with an Austrian television commentator advising viewers to turn off their TV sets, a German television commentator refusing to commentate further, and a German fan burning his national flag in protest. Furious Algerian football officials lodged an official protest, but the two teams denied any collusion. As nothing could be proved and the two teams had technically broken no rules, FIFA allowed the result to stand. FIFA did change the rules – in future World Cups, the final two games in each group are played simultaneously. Thus Algeria were eliminated from the 1982 FIFA World Cup at the first hurdle despite two wins.

=== 1986: Morocco becomes first African team into the Round of 16 ===
As with 1982, 29 African countries entered the qualification process for two spots at the World Cup. There were four series of knockout rounds, with four Mediterranean countries making the final round. Algeria beat neighbours Tunisia 7–1 on aggregate and becomes the first African team to qualify consecutively for the second time to World Cup. Morocco beat Libya 3–1 on aggregate and also qualified for their second World Cup.

Algeria were placed in Group D with Brazil, Spain, and Northern Ireland. They did not reach the heights of its previous finals appearance, drawing 1–1 with Northern Ireland, losing 0–1 to Brazil, and losing 0–3 to Spain.

Morocco shocked both Poland and England with goalless draws, and then defeated Portugal 3–1 to become the first African team to progress beyond the first round. In the second round, they faced a West German side that had seven survivors from the Disgrace of Gijón match. Goalkeeper Badou Zaki kept Morocco in the game with a series of excellent saves, but was finally beaten in the 87th minute by Gijón substitute Lothar Matthäus. West Germany won 1–0 and went on to reach their second successive final.

=== 1990: Cameroon's Indomitable Lions reach the Quarter Finals ===
26 African countries entered the qualification process for 2 spots at the 1990 FIFA World Cup. This was the first time African qualification moved from a mostly straight home-away knockout format to include group stages early on. Finally it came down to four teams playing in two playoffs for the final: Algeria vs Egypt and Tunisia vs Cameroon. Cameroon beat Tunisia 2–0 at home and 1–0 away, and qualified for their second World Cup. However, the playoff between the two North African sides was significantly more ill-tempered.

After a goalless draw in Constantine, Egypt beat Algeria 1–0 in Cairo to qualify for the World Cup. After the Cairo match, an Algerian player gouged out an Egyptian team doctor's eye with a broken bottle. The player blamed, Lakhdar Belloumi (who scored the winning goal in Algeria's 2–1 defeat of West Germany in 1982), was not allowed to travel outside Algeria owing to an Interpol international arrest warrant for twenty years until the (financially compensated) Egyptian doctor dropped the charges in 2009. Belloumi always claimed innocence in the incident, with him and other players pointing the finger at Algerian goalkeeper Kamel Kadri instead.

There was tragedy during the second round Group C match between Nigeria and Angola on 12 August 1989 at the Lagos National Stadium when 24-year-old Nigerian midfielder (and qualified lawyer) Samuel Okwaraji collapsed and died of congestive heart failure in the 77th minute.

Egypt were placed in Group F with England, Netherlands, and Ireland. It turned out to be one of the tightest groups in World Cup history, with five draws in six games. Egypt drew 1–1 with the Netherlands, drew 0–0 with Ireland, but lost their final match 0–1 to England. Egypt's only goal of the tournament was a penalty by Magdi Abdelghani against the Netherlands. Egypt were thus eliminated from World Cup, still without a win after losing their only match in 1934.

Cameroon were undoubtedly the surprise package of the tournament. Led by Russian tactician, manager Valery Nepomnyashchy, in their first match, they shocked Diego Maradona's defending champions Argentina 1–0 through a goal by François Omam-Biyik, despite finishing their match with nine men. In their next match, they defeated Romania 2–1 thanks to two goals from 38-year-old substitute Roger Milla. These were Milla's first official goals in the World Cup; he had had a goal against Peru wrongly disallowed for offside during the 1982 FIFA World Cup. Having already qualified for the next round, Cameroon then suffered their first loss (after three draws and two wins) in World Cup history, losing 4–0 to the already eliminated Soviet Union. In the second round, Cameroon defeated Colombia 2–1, with Milla again coming on as a second-half substitute to score twice, famously dispossessing Colombian goalkeeper René Higuita for one of them. By this time, Roger Milla, his post-goal celebrations, and Cameroon had firmly implanted themselves in the global footballing consciousness. In the quarter finals, they were seven minutes from qualifying for the semi-finals when England were awarded a penalty. England won the match 3–2 after extra time, with three of the five goals coming from penalties (1 for Cameroon, 2 for England).

=== 1994: Zambian air tragedy, Nigeria reaches Round of 16 ===
40 African countries entered the qualification process for 3 spots at the 1994 FIFA World Cup. The extra spot was awarded after the strong performances of Cameroon and Egypt at Italia 90. However, only 28 played all their matches after FIFA rejected Libya (due to UN sanctions) and 11 other nations withdrew at various stages. There was a new qualification format, with two group stages. The big casualty of the first stage was 1990 finalists Egypt, as crowd trouble in Cairo turned a 2–1 home victory over Zimbabwe into a crucial 0–0 draw when FIFA ordered the match replayed at a neutral location.

In the new second stage of qualification were three groups of three, with winners qualifying for the World Cup. The Super Eagles of Nigeria won Group A on goal difference, beating both Ivory Coast and Algeria 4–1 in Lagos. In Group C, Cameroon won the group with 3 wins and a loss away to second placed Zimbabwe, with Guinea coming third.

In Group B were Morocco, Senegal, and Zambia. In the first match, Morocco beat Senegal 1–0. In the second match, Zambia were to face Senegal in Dakar. However, the plane carrying the Zambian team crashed en route on 28 April 1993. The crash, attributed to mechanical problems and pilot error, killed all thirty people on board, including nearly the entire football team – 18 players – and coaches, support staff, and plane crew. (The Zambian government had yet to release a report on the investigation of the crash of the military plane even ten years later.) Only two European-based players from the original squad missed the flight – Charles Musonda of Anderlecht, who was injured, and captain Kalusha Bwalya, who was flying in from Europe where he played with PSV Eindhoven. All matches in the group were postponed for a month. Zambia hastily put together a new team, captained by Bwalya, and defeated Morocco 2–1 in Lusaka in the first match with the new team with goals from Kalusha Bwalya and Johnson Bwalya (not related). However, they lost their final group match 0–1 to Morocco in Casablanca and Morocco won Group B by one point. Amazingly, the rebuilt Chipolopolo (Copper Bullets) also went on to reach the finals of the 1994 African Cup of Nations.

At the 1994 FIFA World Cup finals in the U.S., Cameroon drew their first game in Group B with eventual semi-finalists Sweden 2–2 and lost their second to eventual winners Brazil 0–3. They were 0–3 down to Russia in their third match when half-time substitute Roger Milla scored in the 46th minute (becoming at 42 the oldest man ever to score at the World Cup finals) and sparked brief hopes of a miracle comeback. However, the final score was a 1–6 loss to Russia, with Oleg Salenko netting a record-breaking five goals in vain. In Group F, Morocco lost its three matches by a goal each, 0–1 to Belgium, 1–2 to Saudi Arabia, and 1–2 to the Netherlands.

In Group D, Nigeria thumped eventual semi-finalists Bulgaria 3–0, then fell to a 1–2 loss to Argentina before beating Greece 2–0. Nigeria, Bulgaria, and Argentina all finished on six points and qualified for the second round. In the second round, Nigeria faced Italy. Emmanuel Amuneke scored in the 25th minute, leaving Nigeria with a 1–0 lead two minutes from the next round when Roberto Baggio scored in the 88th minute. Baggio scored again in extra time to send Nigeria home.

This was the third successive World Cup where an African team progressed beyond the first stage, after Morocco in 1986 and Cameroon in 1990. This was a major factor in FIFA increasing Africa's allocation from 3 to 5 spots as the World Cup expanded from 24 to 32 four years later.

=== 1998: Nigeria reaches the Round of 16 again ===
38 African countries entered the qualification process for 5 spots at the 1998 FIFA World Cup, the two new spots resulting from the tournament's expansion from 24 to 32 teams. This was the first time that three points, instead of two, were awarded for a win. Burundi won both their first round qualification matches but then had to withdraw due to civil war. Sierra Leone, who they had just eliminated, took their place in the second round, and then became the first nation in World Cup qualifying history to be eliminated twice in the same qualifying campaign. Eventually, Cameroon, Morocco, Nigeria, and Tunisia qualified for the World Cup finals along with newcomers Bafana Bafana of South Africa, who had only been readmitted to FIFA in 1992.

The five African teams all took European coaches (three Frenchmen, one Serb, one Pole) to the finals, making it the first time since 1974 that there was no African coach at the World Cup.

In Group A, Morocco drew their first match 2–2 with Norway and then lost 0–3 to Brazil. The last two matches in the group were played simultaneously (as they had after the Disgrace of Gijón in 1982) – with ten minutes left, Morocco were leading Scotland 2–0 while Brazil led Norway 1–0. But Norway scored twice in the 83rd and 88th minutes to beat Brazil 2–1. Morocco also scored once more to beat Scotland 3–0, but went home.

In Group B, Cameroon drew their first match 1–1 with Austria (the Austrians equalizing in the 90th minute) but then lost 0–3 to Italy. Cameroon could have progressed if they won their final group match against Chile, but they drew 1–1 and went home. During the final match, Cameroon's Rigobert Song became the first man to pick up red cards at two World Cups – he was sent off as a 17-year-old against Brazil in 1994. (The second man to be red carded at two World Cups would be Zinedine Zidane eight years later.)

In Group C, South Africa began their debut World Cup finals campaign with a 0–3 loss to hosts and eventual champions France. They then drew 1–1 with Denmark, Benni McCarthy scoring their first World Cup finals goal. They needed to win big in their final match against Saudi Arabia but could only manage a 2–2 draw, giving away two penalties and only managing to equalize late into injury time with their own penalty, taken by brace-scorer Shaun Bartlett.

In Group D, Nigeria opened with a 3–2 win over fancied Spain and another 1–0 win over Bulgaria. Having qualified for the next stage, they then lost 1–3 to Paraguay. Both Nigeria and Paraguay qualified for the next stage, with Spain losing out despite thumping Bulgaria 6–1. However, in the Round of 16, Nigeria were beaten 1–4 by Denmark. All Nigeria's six goals in the tournament came from six different players.

In Group G, Tunisia lost their first two matches 0–2 to England and 0–1 to Colombia. They then managed to draw 1–1 with Romania, who had won their first two matches and topped the group. Thus Tunisia's second appearance at the World Cup (after 1978) ended in them scoring only one goal, a penalty.

Thus only 2 of Africa's 5 representatives came away with at least one win. However, there was an African representative in the second round for the fourth time in succession.

=== 2002: Senegal reaches the quarter-finals ===
51 African countries entered the qualification process for five spots at the 2002 FIFA World Cup. Four of the five 1998 finalists again made it through, with Les Lions de la Teranga (Teranga Lions) of Senegal replacing Morocco. Senegal and Morocco topped the same qualification group each with four wins, three draws, and a loss, but Senegal had a seven-goal superior goal difference thanks to their 9–0 aggregate thrashings of group minnows Namibia. In contrast, the Namibians had managed to hold Morocco to a goalless draw in Windhoek.

Like Cameroon 12 years earlier, Senegal started with a shock 1–0 win over the defending champions and went on to reach the quarter finals. In Group A, after beating France 1–0 with a goal from Papa Bouba Diop, they drew 1–1 with eventual group winners Denmark. In their final match against Uruguay, they were leading 3–0 at half-time. In the second half, the South Americans – for whom a win would have them progress at Senegal's expense – scored twice, and then a third time with an 88th-minute penalty kick. Senegal survived the frenetic final minutes of the game to hang on to a 3–3 result. Thus Denmark and Senegal progressed to the next round while former champions Uruguay and France went home. In the Round of 16, a golden goal in extra time (to add to his 37th-minute strike) from Henri Camara took Senegal 2–1 past Sweden after extra time. But in the quarter-finals against Turkey, they were eliminated by a golden goal four minutes into extra time.

In Group B, South Africa drew 2–2 with Paraguay with an injury time penalty, then scored their first ever World Cup win by beating Slovenia 1–0. However a 2–3 loss to Spain then sent South Africa home. In Group E, Cameroon drew 1–1 with Republic of Ireland, beat Saudi Arabia 1–0, and then lost 0–2 to Germany. In Group F, Nigeria lost 0–1 to Argentina, lost 1–2 to Sweden, and having been eliminated, held England to a 0–0 draw. In Group H, Tunisia lost 0–2 to Russia, drew 1–1 with Belgium, and lost 0–2 to co-hosts Japan.

Of Africa's five representatives, three won at least once, but only one progressed beyond the first round. Still, Senegal's surprise run made it the fifth successive time an African nation had made it to the Round of 16, and the second time an African country had reached the quarter finals. Three of the five African nations (South Africa, Nigeria, Tunisia) took a local coach to the World Cup; only one of those three scored a win.

=== 2006: Ghana reaches the Round of 16 ===
51 African countries entered the race for 5 spots at the 2006 FIFA World Cup in a qualification process that doubled as one for the 2006 Africa Cup of Nations. In the final qualification round, teams were organized into five groups of six teams, with winners qualifying for the World Cup and the top three for the continental tournament. More matches were needed to qualify – while at both the 1998 and 2002 32-team World Cups, 3 of the 5 African teams played only 6 matches to get to the finals, here 3 of the 5 teams that qualified played 12 matches. Four of Africa's five representatives to the 2006 FIFA World Cup finals were debutants, in contrast to 2002 when four of five had appeared at the previous World Cup.

In Group 1, Togo beat 2002 World Cup quarter-finalists Senegal by two points. The Black Stars of Ghana won Group 2 by five points while in Group 3, Les Éléphants of Ivory Coast lost both its matches to Cameroon but won the group since Cameroon drew too often. In Group 5, Tunisia won the group one point ahead of 1998 finalists and perennial rivals Morocco. Although Morocco was the only African team (of those who played a match) to remain undefeated, it drew half its matches. In Group 4, Angola and Nigeria both finished with 21 points after 10 matches, with Nigeria having a far superior goal difference thanks largely to scoring five goals against both Algeria and 3rd placed Zimbabwe in their last two matches. However, it had already been decided that head-to-head results were to be used to break such ties in 2006 World Cup Qualification before goal difference. The Palancas Negras (Black Antelopes) of Angola, having beaten Nigeria 2–1 on aggregate, qualified for the World Cup.

At the World Cup Finals, Ivory Coast lost its first two Group C matches 1–2 to Argentina and 1–2 to the Netherlands before coming back from 0–2 down to beat Serbia and Montenegro 3–2. In Group D, Angola – the only African team at the finals with a local coach (Luís Oliveira Gonçalves) – lost their first match 0–1 to Portugal, then drew 0–0 with Mexico and 1–1 with Iran. In Group G, Togo made more news off the pitch with disputes over team bonuses causing coach Otto Pfister to walk out on the team until just before the first match and FIFA officials having to step in to stop players threatening to boycott the second match. Togo lost 1–2 to South Korea, lost 0–2 to Switzerland, and 0–2 to eventual finalists France. In Group H, Tunisia drew 2–2 with Saudi Arabia, lost 1–3 to Spain (including an injury time penalty from Fernando Torres), and 0–1 to Ukraine.

In Group E, Ghana began with up a 0–2 loss to eventual winners Italy with a 2–0 win over the Czech Republic and a 2–1 win over the U.S. Thus the debutants ensured an African representative in the Round of 16 for the sixth successive World Cup. They lost 3–0 to Brazil in the Round of 16. The match was later alleged to have been fixed, charges immediately denied by the Ghana Football Association.

While for the sixth successive time there was an African team in the Round of 16, Africa remained the only continent (other than Oceania) to never have two teams reach the Round of 16 at the same World Cup.

=== 2010: Ghana gets to Quarter Final ===
The 2010 FIFA World Cup was the first time that the FIFA World Cup was staged in Africa, with South Africa being the hosts and thus qualifying automatically, to be a sixth African team in the draw alongside the now-regular five who made it through the qualifying process. Their national team became the first World Cup hosts to get knocked out in the first round, though only on goal difference after a draw with Mexico in their opening match (in which South Africa's Katlego Mphela hit the post in the last minute), then a 3–0 loss to Uruguay followed by a 2–1 win over France (in which Mphela was again unlucky, scoring one of the goals but being denied three more by two fine saves and the woodwork again): Mexico finished second ahead of them by virtue of a smaller loss to Uruguay and a larger win over France. Nigeria, Algeria, Ivory Coast and Cameroon also exited the tournament after the Group stages.

However, Ghana progressed beyond the group stages of the FIFA World Cup for the second time in a row, and defeated the U.S. 2–1 after extra time in the Round of 16, which saw them reach the quarter-finals, becoming the third African nation to do so. In the quarter-finals, they were eliminated by Uruguay. Ghana were defeated by Uruguay on penalties after Luis Suárez controversially handballed on the goal line deep into extra time, denying Ghana an almost certain winning goal. The penalty that followed was missed by Asamoah Gyan. Had Ghana won their quarter final they would have become the very first African nation to progress to the semi-finals of the world cup. Of the 32 countries that participated in the 2010 FIFA World Cup, FIFA ranked Ghana 7th.

=== 2014: Algeria and Nigeria: 2 African teams to the Round of 16 ===
The 2014 FIFA World Cup in Brazil marked the first time more than one African team went beyond the group stages. While Ghana and Cameroon both collected disappointing results (apart from Ghana's 2–2 draw with later champions Germany, which saw them becoming the only team not to lose against the Germans in the entire tournament) and eventually ended fourth in their group, Ivory Coast were also knocked out in the first round after a last-minute penalty kick against Greece and ended third in Group C, above Japan, whom they had defeated 2–1 in their first match.

Africa's pride, however, was saved by both Nigeria and Algeria. The Nigerians kicked off their Group F campaign with a disappointing 0–0 draw against Iran, before eventually defeating debutants Bosnia and Herzegovina 1–0. Stephen Keshi's team went down 3–2 to later finalists Argentina in their final match, leaving them on the brink of elimination, but Iran lost to the Bosnians 3–1 and Nigeria went through to the Round of 16 for the third time in history, after 1998 and 1994.

Algeria lost 2–1 to a strong Belgium in their opening match in Group H, a loss which was followed by an unexpected 4–2 victory over the South Korea in Porto Alegre in their second match. In their final Group H encounter, a hard-won 1–1 draw with Russia was enough to send the North Africans through to the next round.

In the Round of 16, both African teams fell just short to beat the likes of France (Nigeria) and Germany (Algeria), but the fact that two African nations had reached that far, was a reason to be optimistic about the future of African football.

During the 2014 edition, Ghana striker Asamoah Gyan became Africa's all-time leading topscorer at the FIFA World Cup, having scored 6 goals in 3 World Cups, thus exceeding Cameroon veteran Roger Milla's 5 goals.

=== 2018: No African teams in the Round of 16 for the first time since 1982 ===
The 2018 FIFA World Cup in Russia saw early elimination for Egypt, Morocco and Tunisia who all lost their first two group games. Nigeria also lost their first group game against Croatia 2–0, but the team got a win in their second game, over Iceland 2–0, leaving them with a chance if they could get a result against 2014 finalists Argentina. However, they lost the decisive game, Argentina scoring the winner with just four minutes left to win 2–1, and were eliminated after finishing third in Group D.

Senegal won their opening game against Poland 2–1, and drew their second game against Japan 2-2, leaving them needing a draw in their final game against Colombia to be sure of progressing. However, they went down 0–1, and because Japan lost 0–1 as well, Senegal and Japan were level on points (4), goal difference (+0), goals scored (4) and on the head-to-head result between the teams (2-2). However, they bowed out due to the fair play tiebreaker - the first team ever to be eliminated by this particular tiebreaker method, implemented for the first time that year - having received six yellow cards to Japan's four over the course of the three games, finishing third in Group H, resulting in all African teams being eliminated in the group stage for the first time since 1982.

=== 2022: Morocco's semi-finalists lead African charge in Qatar ===
Out of 54 teams that entered the qualifying competition, Africa's five qualifiers for the World Cup were Senegal, Tunisia, Morocco, Cameroon and Ghana. Ghana's qualification was particularly close: needing to win their last match against South Africa in the second-round group stage, their 1–0 win saw them just pip South Africa on goals scored, the teams being level on goal difference and points. The other nine group winners all won their groups outright on points, to put ten teams into the third round consisting of five two-legged playoffs. And then in Ghana's play-off against Nigeria, both matches were drawn 0–0 and 1–1, but Ghana qualified on away goals. Cameroon also required the away-goals rule against Algeria, and Senegal went through only on a penalty shoot-out against Egypt. Morocco defeated DR Congo, and Tunisia defeated Mali, to complete the third qualification round. All five African teams won at least one match, four of them defeating the group's official top-seed favourites (although this includes hosts Qatar, who were only a "top seed" by virtue of being the hosts). Senegal and Morocco in fact were each to score two victories in the group stages (the first time two African teams had achieved this in the same World Cup), en route to qualifying for the second round.

Senegal, in Group A, had to play Holland in their opening match, giving a good account of themselves but conceding two late goals to lose 2–0. They performed better against the host team Qatar, beating them 3–1, and found themselves in the position of needing to beat Ecuador in their final match to qualify. They duly won 2–1 to finish second in their group behind the Dutch, and set up a second-round tie against England - becoming in the process the first African team to win two matches in the group stage since Nigeria in 1998. Senegal had a couple of good chances early on - Ismaïla Sarr had one shot saved, and spooned another over the bar - but England's Jordan Henderson and Harry Kane both scored before half-time, and another was added afterwards by Bukayo Saka, to preserve their unbeaten record against African nations with a 3–0 win and end Senegal's run.

Tunisia, in Group D, drew their opening match with Denmark 0–0, but then lost 1–0 to Australia and went into their final match needing to beat the current world champions, France and hoping for a draw in the other match. Tunisia scored the upset win that they needed - a late French equalizer being denied for offside - but Australia and Denmark failed to oblige, Australia's victory keeping them in second place ahead of the African team, who finished third in the group.

Morocco fared better in Group F. Although drawn in a group with Croatia and Belgium, who had come second and third in the previous 2018 FIFA World Cup, they managed a 0–0 draw against Croatia and followed up with a 2–0 victory over Belgium. A draw against group minnows Canada, the latter already mathematically eliminated, would have been enough to qualify for the second stage, and in fact Morocco took a 2–0 lead with half an hour gone. They conceded an own-goal just before half-time, but that was the final goal of the game: Morocco's 2–1 victory was enough not just to qualify but to win the group, thanks to a draw between Belgium and Croatia. Morocco thus became the first African side to go through the group stage unbeaten since Senegal in 2002 (Morocco themselves having also achieved the feat in 1986): and the second African team to take first place in their group twice, following on from Nigeria in 1994 and 1998 and Morocco's own exploits of 1986. Morocco's 7 points (2 wins, 1 draw) was a new African record as well (ahead of Nigeria's achievements in 1994 and 1998)

The second-round match against Spain was a dour, defensive affair in which Spain had nearly all the possession but few clear chances at goal, Morocco too had only two shots on target and both were saved. In the last minute of extra time, Sarabia hit the post for Spain: the game went to penalties, and after the first three for each side, Morocco were 2–0 up, all three Spaniards having missed. Morocco's fourth penalty was scored by Hakimi, the player born in Madrid knocking Spain out of the World Cup and sending Morocco to the quarter-finals for the first time. And in the quarter-final, Morocco were to play Portugal - who, like Spain, had the majority of the possession but not many chances, Morocco prepared to sit back and try to counter-attack. A couple of chances thus fell to Youssef En-Nesyri, who missed the first two, but scored just before half-time to give Morocco the lead. Portugal were unable to force an equalizer. Bruno Fernandes hit the post, and both Cristiano Ronaldo's shot and Pepe's late header in injury-time flew wide of the post. Even though the injury-time dismissal of Cheddira for a second bookable offence saw them reduced to ten men, Morocco held on to their 1–0 lead and became the first African nation to reach the semi-finals. Unfortunately, Morocco's fairy tale journey ended as they faltered 2–0 to France in the semi-finals, despite dominating possession and a nearly equal amount of shots to the world champions, and thus Morocco failed to make history as the first African team in the final of a FIFA World Cup. In the match for third place against Croatia, Morocco lost 2–1 to the European opponents and thus, matched the result of South Korea in 2002 as Morocco took a fourth-place finish.

Cameroon fared less well in Group G. A 1–0 defeat against Switzerland was followed by a ding-dong 3–3 draw against Serbia in which Cameroon took the lead but conceded two goals in first-half injury time, to go in trailing at the break: Serbia scored a third before Cameroon rallied and levelled the score, but neither team was able to force a winner. This unfortunately left Cameroon with the tall order of needing a victory against Brazil, who were already qualified as top of the group and made nine changes to give their second-string players a game, and still needing to hope that Switzerland failed to beat Serbia. Surprisingly, Cameroon did in fact beat Brazil with an injury-time winner from Vincent Aboubakar - who received his second yellow card of the game for his over-enthusiastic celebration and was thus red-carded: Cameroon became the first team to beat Brazil in a group-stage match since Norway in 1998, the first African team to beat Brazil in the FIFA World Cup, and also Cameroon's first-ever win since 2002, but it was to no avail since Switzerland beat Serbia 3–2 to hold on to second place and leave Cameroon in third.

Ghana's first two matches, in Group H, saw a lot of goals. Against Portugal, the match was goalless till halfway through the second half, when an incident in the penalty area saw video evidence used to award Portugal a penalty, from which they scored. Ghana equalized shortly afterwards, but then conceded two more quick goals to trail 3–1, pulling back a late goal in the last minute but failing to force an equalizer in injury time, Ghana eventually lost 3–2. In the second match against South Korea, Ghana surged into a 2–0 lead at half-time: South Korea pulled both goals back early in the second half, only for Ghana to score a third shortly afterwards and then withstand Korean pressure to hold on for a 3–2 win. This left them in second place in the group before their final match against Uruguay: a win or a draw would have put them through, and things looked promising when Ghana were awarded an early penalty, which was taken by André Ayew - the only remaining Ghanaian player from the 2010 quarter-final against Uruguay. However, it was saved: then Uruguay scored two goals before half-time. South Korea's injury-time victory over Portugal in the other match, putting them ahead of Uruguay on goals scored, forced both sides to go for broke in the final stages - Uruguay in search of a third to improve their goal difference, Ghana in search of getting some goals back - but neither side was able to put the ball in the net, Uruguay's victory serving only to overtake Ghana for third place and condemn the Africans to last place in the group.

=== 2026: Most Africans in the knockout rounds ===
The expansion to 48 teams in the 2026 FIFA World Cup led to Africa having 9 guaranteed spots. Only Cameroon did not return from 2022, surpassed by Cape Verde qualifying for their first tournament. Senegal, Tunisia, Morocco, and Ghana were joined by squads last seen in 2010 (South Africa), 2014 (Algeria and Ivory Coast) and 2018 (Egypt). Out of the four best second placed teams from the qualifiers, DR Congo beat both Cameroon and Nigeria to enter the inter-confederation play-offs, and after defeating Jamaica managed to make its first World Cup ever since its appearance as Zaire in 1974.

Tunisia was the only African eliminated in the group stage, losing all their three games. Four teams earned knockout spots among the best ranked third-place teams: Algeria lost to Argentina, but beat Jordan, and qualified in a high-scoring 3–3 draw with Austria; DR Congo held onto a draw with Portugal and in spite of losing to Colombia, managed a comeback win against Uzbekistan; Ghana ended its group losing to Croatia but had enough points after defeating Panama and keeping England out in a scoreless draw; and Senegal, after losing two games, finished with a blowout 5–0 win over Iraq. The others were runner-ups in their groups: South Africa lost the tournament's opening game with Mexico, but then tied the Czech Republic in the final minutes and upset South Korea with a Thapelo Maseko goal; Ivory Coast only lost to Germany while beating both Ecuador and Curaçao; along with ties against Belgium and Iran, after not managing to win a match in three tournaments across 92 years, Egypt scored its first victory with a 3–1 comeback win against New Zealand; Morocco opened with a draw against Brazil, and after beating Scotland and Haiti only finished second to Brazil on goal difference; and Cape Verde had strong performances by goalkeeper Vozinha to draw all their matches, against Spain, Uruguay, and Saudi Arabia.

The round of 32 had two Africans going through after a win in the penalty shoot-outs, Morocco against the Netherlands and Egypt vs. Australia. Otherwise, South Africa lost 1–0 to Canada after conceding in the closing minutes of stoppage time, DR Congo and Senegal both fell to comeback wins by England and Belgium respectively, Ivory Coast equalized against Norway but ultimately lost 2–1, Algeria and Ghana lacked scoring chances losing to Switzerland (2–0) and Colombia (1–0) and Cape Verde tied twice against Argentina in an overtime 3–2 loss.

In the round of 16, Morocco returned to the quarter-finals after beating co-hosts Canada by 3–0, while Egypt, after having a 2–0 lead in their match against Argentina, lost 3–2. The quarter-finals had Morocco again facing France, and in spite of ending the first half scoreless, the second repeated the 2–0 defeat of the 2022 semi-final.

== African firsts at the World Cup ==
=== World Cup finals ===
- 1934: Egypt, first African country at the World Cup.
- 1934: Abdulrahman Fawzi of Egypt, first African to score at the World Cup, who scored both Egypt's goals in 2–4 loss against Hungary. He netted a third, but was ruled offside.
- 1970: Morocco, first African country to draw a match at the World Cup finals, with 1–1 draw with Bulgaria.
- 1974: Zaire, first African team to finish without scoring in the World Cup finals.
- 1974: Kidumu Mantantu of Zaire, first African player to receive a yellow card at the World Cup (against Scotland on 14 June 1974).
- 1974: Mulamba Ndaye of Zaire, first African player to receive a red card at the World Cup (against Yugoslavia on 18 June 1974).
- 1978: Tunisia, first African country to win a match at the World Cup finals, 3–1 over Mexico.
- 1978: Abdelmajid Chetali of Tunisia, first African coach at the World Cup finals.
- 1982: Algeria, first African team to win twice at the group stage (The first team eliminated after winning twice in the group stages of the FIFA World Cup).
- 1982: FIFA introduced a revised qualification system at subsequent World Cups in which the final two games in each group were played simultaneously after Algeria protesting against its controversial elimination from the group stage caused by the match named Disgrace of Gijón.
- 1986: Algeria, first African team to qualify twice in a row (1982 and 1986).
- 1986: Morocco, first African team to reach round of 16, also first African team to win their group in the group stages.
- 1990: Cameroon, first African team to win over the reigning champions Argentina 1–0.
- 1990: Cameroon, first team in the history of the World Cup to win a match with nine players only, beating Argentina 1–0.
- 1990: Cameroon, first African team to reach quarter-finals.
- 1990: Magdi Abdelghani of Egypt, first African to score a penalty at the World Cup in the 1–1 draw against the Netherlands.
- 1994: Nigeria's 3–0 win over Bulgaria was the first three-goal victory by an African team at the World Cup.
- 1994: Roger Milla of Cameroon, the oldest player to score at World Cup Finals, aged 42, against Russia. (Russia won the match 6–1)
- 1998: Youssef Chippo of Morocco. first African to score an own goal at the World Cup, in the 2–2 draw against Norway on 10 June 1998. Two days later, Pierre Issa of South Africa scored an own goal in the 0–3 loss to France.
- 1998: Nigeria, first African team to qualify from consecutive World Cup group stages.
- 2010: South Africa, first African country to host the World Cup.
- 2010: Itumeleng Khune of South Africa, first African goalkeeper to receive a red card at the World Cup (against Uruguay. He was the second goalkeeper ever sent off at the World Cup finals, after Italy's Gianluca Pagliuca at the 1994 FIFA World Cup).
- 2010: Rabah Saâdane of Algeria, first African coach to coach twice at the World Cup Finals.
- 2014: Algeria and Nigeria, first occasion in which two African teams qualified for round of 16.
- 2014: Nigeria, first African team to qualify to the round of 16 three times in its history of participation.
- 2014: Algeria, first African team to score four goals in one match, in the 4–2 win against South Korea.
- 2014: Stephen Keshi of Nigeria, first African coach to reach round of 16.
- 2018: Essam El-Hadary of Egypt, the oldest player and captain in the history of the World Cup finals, aged 45 years and 161 days, against Saudi Arabia.
- 2018: Essam El-Hadary of Egypt, first African goalkeeper to save a penalty at the World Cup finals.
- 2018: Senegal, first team to be eliminated due to the fair play points tiebreaker.
- 2018: Sofyan Amrabat of Morocco, who came on as a substitute for his brother Nordin Amrabat in the 76th minute in the group match against Iran, is the first player in World Cup history to replace a relative as a substitute.
- 2022: Walid Regragui of Morocco, first African coach to reach the quarter-finals and semi-finals.
- 2022: Morocco, first African team to reach the semi-finals.
- 2022: First World Cup where every African team won at least one match (excluding World Cups with only one African team).
- 2026: Senegal became the first African team to score five goals in one match, in a 5–0 win against Iraq.
- 2026: Morocco, first African team with consecutive World Cup quarter-final appearances.
- 2030: Morocco, first North African country and second African country to host the World Cup.

=== World Cup qualifiers ===
- 1978 WCQ: Tunisia, first African team to use penalties in World Cup qualification, beating Morocco 4–2 on penalties after a 1–1 draw.
- 2002 WCQ: Abdul Hamid Bassiouny of Egypt, the fastest-ever hat-trick in an "A" international, scored a hat-trick in 177 seconds against Namibia in Alexandria on 13 July 2001 during an 8–2 win by Egypt.
- 2010 WCQ: Algeria, most matches played by an African team to qualify for the World Cup finals, 13 matches.

== See also ==
- Football in Africa
- FIFA World Cup records and statistics
