= Paulo Figueiredo =

Angolan footballer

Personal information
- Full name: Paulo José Lopes de Figueiredo
- Date of birth: 28 November 1972 (age 53)
- Place of birth: Malanje, Angola
- Height: 1.70 m (5 ft 7 in)
- Position: Midfielder

Youth career
- 1982–1984: Domingos Sávio
- 1985–1986: Benfica
- 1986–1989: Domingos Sávio
- 1989–1991: Belenenses

Senior career*
Years	Team	Apps	(Gls)
1991–1992	Belenenses	1	(0)
1992–1993	União Tomar	29	(1)
1993–1994	Aves	0	(0)
1994–1995	O Elvas	31	(2)
1995–1996	Camacha	32	(1)
1996–2004	Santa Clara	256	(27)
2004	Dragões Sandinenses	17	(4)
2005	Lusitânia	9	(0)
2005–2006	Varzim	26	(3)
2006–2007	Öster	31	(1)
2007	Ceahlăul	0	(0)
2008	Olivais Moscavide	8	(0)
2009	Libolo	10	(0)
Total		450	(39)

International career
2003–2008	Angola	38	(5)
- * Club domestic league appearances and goals

Paulo José Lopes de Figueiredo (Portuguese pronunciation: [fiɣɐjˈɾeðu]; born 28 November 1972) is an Angolan former professional footballer who played as a central midfielder.

He spent the bulk of his 18-year career with Santa Clara, amassing Primeira Liga totals of 97 matches and eight goals over three seasons (eight in total with the club).

An Angola international for five years, Figueiredo earned 38 caps and represented the nation at the 2006 World Cup and two Africa Cup of Nations tournaments.

== Club career ==
Figueiredo was born in Malanje, Portuguese Angola to Portuguese settlers, moving to the land of his parents at the age of three. From 1991 to 1996 he played for five clubs, including one spell at C.F. Os Belenenses for which he featured only once in the Segunda Liga in the 1991–92 season.

In summer 1996, Figueiredo signed for second-division C.D. Santa Clara, scoring five goals in 33 matches in his third year as they promoted to the Primeira Liga for the first time ever. He made his debut in the competition on 22 August 1999 in a 2–2 home draw against Sporting CP, and made 31 league appearances during the 1999–2000 campaign, but the Azores side were immediately relegated.

After four more seasons with Santa Clara (two in the top flight) and nearly 300 official games, Figueiredo moved to the Portuguese lower leagues, splitting 2004–05 with S.C. Dragões Sandinenses and S.C. Lusitânia. He then joined Sweden's Östers IF, being relegated in his only season in the Allsvenskan.

Figueiredo spent 2007–08 with FC Ceahlăul Piatra Neamț in Romania and C.D. Olivais e Moscavide in Portugal, without any competitive appearances for the former team. Subsequently, he closed out his career in his homeland after one year with C.R.D. Libolo.

== International career ==
In 2003, aged almost 31, Figueiredo was invited to play for Angola, and returned for the first time in almost 30 years to the country of his birth. After featuring heavily during the 2006 FIFA World Cup qualifying campaign – ten games, scoring against Nigeria in a 1–1 away draw on 18 June 2005– he was selected to the finals in Germany, playing all three group-stage matches as the Palancas Negras managed two draws in their first participation ever.

Figueiredo also took part in two Africa Cup of Nations tournaments, exiting at the group phase in 2006 and reaching the quarter-finals two years later.

== Personal life ==
Figueiredo's son, Bruno, was also a footballer.

== Career statistics ==
=== International goals ===
Scores and results list Angola's goal tally first, score column indicates score after each Figueiredo goal.

No	Date	Venue	Opponent	Score	Result	Competition
1.	21 June 2003	Samuel Ogbemudia Stadium, Benin City, Nigeria	Nigeria	1–0	2–2	2004 Africa Cup of Nations qualification
2.	18 June 2005	Sani Abacha Stadium, Kano, Nigeria	Nigeria	1–1	1–1	2006 FIFA World Cup qualification
3.	25 March 2007	Estádio da Cidadela, Luanda, Angola	Eritrea	6–1	6–1	2008 Africa Cup of Nations qualification
4.	17 June 2007	Estádio da Cidadela, Luanda, Angola	Swaziland	1–0	3–0	2008 Africa Cup of Nations qualification
5.	13 January 2008	Complexo Desportivo, Alverca do Ribatejo, Portugal	Egypt	1–1	3–3	Friendly
