= Edson Nobre =

Angolan footballer

Edson
Personal information
- Full name: Edson de Jesus Nobre
- Date of birth: 2 March 1980 (age 46)
- Place of birth: Benguela, Angola
- Height: 1.73 m (5 ft 8 in)
- Positions: Winger; forward

Youth career
- Anadia

Senior career*
Years	Team	Apps	(Gls)
1999–2001	Mealhada		
2001–2003	Anadia		
2003–2005	Oliveira Bairro	64	(17)
2005–2009	Paços Ferreira	102	(12)
2009	Ethnikos Achna	2	(0)
2010	Libolo	11	(0)
2011	Arouca	0	(0)
2011–2012	Aliados Lordelo	0	(0)

International career
2005–2009	Angola	16	(0)
- * Club domestic league appearances and goals

Edson de Jesus Nobre (born 2 March 1980), known simply as Edson, is an Angolan retired footballer who played mainly as a winger.

He spent most of his professional career in Portugal, mainly with Paços de Ferreira with which he appeared in the 2008–09 UEFA Cup.

Edson represented Angola at the 2006 World Cup.

== Club career ==
Born in Benguela, Edson started his professional career in Portugal at the age of 19, going on to play lower league football with G.D. Mealhada and Anadia FC. In 2005, his third division performances with Oliveira do Bairro S.C. caught the attention of Primeira Liga club F.C. Paços de Ferreira.

Edson made his league debut against C.D. Nacional on 21 August 2005, playing the full 90 minutes in a 0–1 home loss. In his second season, as Paços reached the UEFA Cup for the first time ever, he scored four goals in 25 matches, but was never an undisputed starter in his four-year stay.

In the summer of 2009, Edson signed with Cyprus' Ethnikos Achna FC. However, this spell would be quite unsuccessful, and he returned to his country in the following transfer window, joining C.R.D. Libolo.

== International career ==
An Angolan international since 2005, Edson was called up to the following year's Africa Cup of Nations and the FIFA World Cup. In the latter tournament, he played 20 minutes in the 1–0 defeat to Portugal in the group stage.

Edson also participated in the 2008 Africa Cup of Nations, coming on as a late substitute in the quarter-final match against Egypt, a 2–1 loss.
