= Luís Delgado =

Angolan footballer (born 1979)

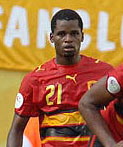

Personal information
- Full name: Luís Manuel Ferreira Delgado
- Date of birth: November 1, 1979 (age 46)
- Place of birth: Luanda, Angola
- Height: 1.78 m (5 ft 10 in)
- Position: Full back

Senior career*
Years	Team	Apps	(Gls)
2001–2003	Petro Atletico		
2003–2005	Primeiro Agosto		
2005–2006	Petro Atletico		
2006–2009	FC Metz	35	(0)
2009–2010	Guingamp	7	(0)

International career^{‡}
1998–2008	Angola	26	(1)
- * Club domestic league appearances and goals as of 21 April 2009 ‡ National team caps and goals as of 21 June 2006

Luís Manuel Ferreira Delgado (born 1 November 1979 in Luanda), is an Angolan retired professional footballer who played mainly as a left defender.

== Club career ==
Delgado began his career with Petro Atletico and joined later to rivals Primeiro de Agosto the best two major football teams in Angolan Championship Girabola. After good performances in the 2006 FIFA World Cup, Delgado transferred to French club FC Metz. As result of the promotion of FC Metz to the French Ligue 1, Delgado became the first Angolan football player to play for a team in the top tier of the French football.

On June 5, 2009, the Angola international left-back signed a two-year contract with En Avant de Guingamp on a free transfer.

== International career ==
Delgado has represented Angola in 2 FIFA World Cup qualification matches and was called up to the 2006 World Cup.

== National team statistics ==
Angola national team
Year	Apps	Goals
1998		
1999	3	0
2000	0	0
2001	0	0
2002	0	0
2003	1	0
2004	0	0
2005	1	0
2006	11	0
2007	1	0
2008	1	0
Total		
