= João Ricardo (footballer, born 1970) =

Angolan footballer (born 1970)

Personal information
- Full name: João Ricardo Pereira Batalha dos Santos Ferreira
- Date of birth: 7 January 1970 (age 56)
- Place of birth: Luanda, Portuguese Angola
- Height: 1.81 m (5 ft 11 1/2 in)
- Position: Goalkeeper

Youth career
- 1985–1993: Leiria Marrazes

Senior career*
Years	Team	Apps	(Gls)
1988–1993	Leiria Marrazes		
1993–1998	Académico Viseu	107	(0)
1998–2001	Salgueiros	1	(0)
2001–2005	Moreirense	97	(0)
2007–2008	Petro Atlético	21	(0)
2011	Semarang United	15	(0)
Total		241	(0)

International career
1996–2006	Angola	29	(0)
- * Club domestic league appearances and goals

João Ricardo Pereira Batalha Santos Ferreira (born 7 January 1970), known as João Ricardo (Portuguese pronunciation: [ʒuˈɐ̃w ʁiˈkaɾðu]), is an Angolan retired footballer who played as a goalkeeper.

== Club career ==
The son of Portuguese settlers, João Ricardo was born in Luanda, Portuguese Angola. He returned to his parents' homeland in 1974, aged four, with the family moving to Leiria where he started playing youth football, making his senior debuts with the same team, amateurs Sport Clube Leiria e Marrazes.

João Ricardo joined Académico de Viseu FC in the 1993 summer, playing four seasons in the second division and one in the third with the club. His first Primeira Liga experience arrived with S.C. Salgueiros, but he could only appear once in the league in his three seasons combined.

João Ricardo returned to the second level in 2001 with Moreirense FC, playing in all the matches in his first year as the Moreira de Cónegos side, led by Manuel Machado, promoted to the top flight for the first time ever. He maintained his first-choice status in two of the following three years, suffering relegation in 2005.

After more than one year without a club, 37-year-old João Ricardo returned to his nation of birth and signed for Atlético Petróleos de Luanda, being included in the squad that competed in the 2007 edition of the CAF Champions League. He retired from the game in the following year, but returned three years later for a brief spell in Indonesia with Semarang United FC.

== International career ==
João Ricardo opted to represent Angola internationally, his first cap coming in 1996 at the age of 26. Ten years later, he appeared with the national team in the Africa Cup of Nations in Egypt, in an eventual group stage exit.

João Ricardo was also selected for the 2006 FIFA World Cup in Germany, being a free agent with no competitive football played in one year at the time. He started in all three group stage matches for Angola in their first FIFA World Cup presence, conceding only twice and performing most notably in the 0–0 draw against Mexico.

After the tournament, João Ricardo was offered a contract by Iran's Zob Ahan Isfahan FC (the Iranian national team also faced Angola in the World Cup), but the deal eventually fell through due to undisclosed circumstances.
