= Zé Kalanga =

Angolan footballer (born 1983)

Personal information
- Full name: Paulo Baptista Nsimba
- Date of birth: 12 October 1983 (age 43)
- Place of birth: Luanda, Angola
- Height: 1.75 m (5 ft 9 in)
- Position: Right winger

Youth career
- 2000–2004: Bristol City

Senior career*
Years	Team	Apps	(Gls)
2003	Benfica de Luanda		
2004–2006	Petro Atletico	45	(17)
2006–2010	Dinamo București	33	(2)
2007–2008	→ Boavista (loan)	22	(0)
2010–2011	Libolo	9	(0)
2011–2012	Santos de Angola	5	(4)
2013–2016	Bravos do Maquis	18	(1)
2017	Santa Rita	8	(0)
Total		140	(24)

International career
2000	Angola U-20		
2003–2010	Angola	55	(6)
Medal record
Men's football
Representing Angola
African Nations Championship
Runner-up	2011 Sudan
- * Club domestic league appearances and goals

Paulo Baptista Nsimba (born 12 October 1983), nicknamed Zé Kalanga, is an Angolan former professional footballer who played as a right winger.

== Club career ==
=== Early career ===
Zé Kalanga was born on 12 October 1983 in Luanda, Angola and played junior-level football in England at Bristol City. He began his senior career in 2004 at Angolan club Petro Atletico in his hometown of Luanda, showing an appetite for goals in his three-season spell.

=== Dinamo București and Boavista ===
His bright and promising performances for Angola on the right wing in the 2006 World Cup earned the 23-year-old a move to Romanian club Dinamo București which needed a replacement for Florentin Petre. Dinamo paid Petro Atletico a fee estimated by the Romanian press between $200,000–500,000 for his transfer. Upon arriving at the Bucharest Henri Coandă airport, his first words in front of the reporters at the advice of the club's officials were:"Batem Steaua!" (We will defeat Steaua!). He made his Liga I debut on 13 August 2006 in a 1–0 away win over Jiul Petroșani and kept his promise as in his first derby, Dinamo won 1–0 against Steaua. Zé Kalanga scored his first goal in the league on 1 October in a 3–1 win over rivals Rapid București, followed by another one in April 2007 in a 2–0 victory against Gloria Bistrița, and those were his only two goals scored in the 21 league games coach Mircea Rednic used him, as the team won the title. He also appeared in five matches as The Red Dogs reached the round of 32 in the 2006–07 UEFA Cup where they were eliminated with 3–1 on aggregate by Benfica.

In June 2007, Zé Kalanga did not attend Dinamo's pre-season reunion after the summer break. Following this, he was loaned out to Portuguese side Boavista for the duration of the 2007–08 season, making his debut on 15 September 2007 under coach Jaime Pacheco in a 0–0 draw against Leixões, and his performance was highly regarded. He played constantly for them, a highlight being an assist to Jorge Ribeiro's goal in the 2–0 win over Sporting Lisbon. Zé Kalanga played 22 league games, helping The Panthers finish in 9th place, but the club ended up being relegated because of referee corruption in the 2003–04 season.

Zé Kalanga returned to Dinamo in September 2008, but he played rarely during one and a half seasons spent at the club. With The Red Dogs, he has a total of 33 Liga I games with two goals scored and seven appearances without scoring in European competitions.

=== Late career ===
Zé Kalanga was sold by Dinamo in January 2010 back to Angola at Libolo for $500,000. He spent the rest of his career in Angola, also playing for Santos de Angola, Bravos do Maquis and Santa Rita until his retirement in 2017.

== International career ==
Zé Kalanga made his debut for Angola under coach Ismael Kurtz on 31 May 2003 in a 1–1 friendly draw against Gabon. Coach Oliveira Gonçalves took him in the squad for the 2006 Africa Cup of Nations, using him in a loss to Cameroon and a win over Togo as the team failed to progress from their group.

He played eight games and scored one goal in a 3–0 success against Gabon during the 2006 FIFA World Cup qualifiers, the team earning the qualification to the final tournament after a 1–0 win over Rwanda with Zé Kalanga providing the assist to Akwá's goal. In the final tournament, Angola did not get past the group stage, but coach Gonçalves used Zé Kalanga in all three matches, a 1–0 loss to Portugal, a 0–0 draw against Mexico and a 1–1 draw against Iran, at the latter he was voted Man of the Match as he provided the assist to Flávio's goal. For his performances in 2006, Zé Kalanga was awarded by an Angolan radio with the "Newcomer of the year" title.

He made four appearances and scored one goal in a 6–1 win over Eritrea during the successful 2008 Africa Cup of Nations qualifiers. Gonçalves used him in all four games in the final tournament, as the team got past the group stage, being defeated by Egypt in the quarter-finals. Zé Kalanga's impressive performance, especially in the 3–1 win over Senegal when he provided an assist to Manucho's headed goal, made Eurosport place him in the team of the tournament. In the following years he played five games during the 2010 FIFA World Cup qualifiers, scoring in a 3–1 victory over Niger and was used by coach Manuel José in two games in the 2010 Africa Cup of Nations, organized by his nation, including playing in the 1–0 quarter-final loss to Ghana. Zé Kalanga's last appearance for the national team took place on 3 March 2010 in a 1–1 friendly draw against Latvia, having a total of 55 matches with six goals scored for the Black Sable antelopes.

== Career statistics ==
Scores and results list Angola's goal tally first, score column indicates score after each Zé Kalanga goal.

List of international goals scored by Zé Kalanga
No.	Date	Venue	Opponent	Score	Result	Competition
1	22 February 2005	Stade Alphonse Massemba-Débat, Brazzaville, Congo	Congo	2–0	2–0	Friendly
2	4 September 2005	Estádio da Cidadela, Luanda, Angola	Gabon	3–0	3–0	2006 FIFA World Cup qualification
3	30 April 2006	Setsoto Stadium, Maseru, Lesotho	Lesotho	2–0	3–0	2006 COSAFA Cup
4	30 April 2006	Setsoto Stadium, Maseru, Lesotho	Lesotho	3–0	3–0	2006 COSAFA Cup
5	25 March 2007	Complexo Desportivo da Cidadela, Luanda, Angola	Eritrea	3–0	6–0	2008 African Cup of Nations qualification
6	12 October 2008	Estádio dos Coqueiros, Luanda, Angola	Niger	3–1	3–1	2010 FIFA World Cup qualification

== Honours ==
Recreativo do Libolo

- Girabola:(1) 2011

Bravos do Maquis

- Angola Cup:(1) 2015

Dinamo București

- Liga I: 2006–07

Angola

- COSAFA Cup: 2004
- African Nations Championship: runner-up 2011
