= Kali (footballer) =

Angolan footballer

Personal information
- Full name: Carlos Manuel Gonçalves Alonso
- Date of birth: 11 October 1978 (age 48)
- Place of birth: Luanda, Angola
- Height: 1.87 m (6 ft 2 in)
- Position: Defender

Senior career*
Years	Team	Apps	(Gls)
1998–2001	Barreirense	100	(4)
2001–2005	Santa Clara	100	(0)
2005–2006	Barreirense	13	(0)
2006–2009	Sion	76	(0)
2009	Arles-Avignon	7	(1)
2010–2014	Primeiro de Agosto		

International career
2003–2011	Angola	81	(1)
Medal record
Men's football
Representing Angola
African Nations Championship
Runner-up	2011 Sudan
- * Club domestic league appearances and goals

Carlos Manuel Gonçalves Alonso, better known as Kali (born 11 October 1978) is an Angolan former professional footballer who played as a defender.

== International career ==
Kali is a former member of the Angola national team, and was called up to the 2006 FIFA World Cup. He was named in the Angolan squad for the 2008 African Cup of Nations in Ghana as a player on the starting 11.

== Career statistics ==
Appearances and goals by national team and year
National team	Year	Apps	Goals
Angola	2003	5	0
Angola	2004	8	0
Angola	2005	4	0
Angola	2006	10	0
Angola	2007	7	0
Angola	2008	13	0
Angola	2009	12	0
Angola	2010	11	0
Angola	2011	11	1
Total		81	1

"Scores and results list Angola's goal tally first score column indicates score after each Kali goal."

List of international goals scored by Kali
No.	Date	Venue	Oponente	score	Result	Competition
1	7 Fevereiro 2011	Port Sudan Stadium, Port Sudan, Sudan	Tunisia	1-1	1-1	2011 African Nations Championship

== Honours ==
Angola

- African Nations Championship: runner-up 2011
