= Mateus (footballer, born June 1984) =

Angolan footballer

Personal information
- Full name: Mateus Galiano da Costa
- Date of birth: 19 June 1984 (age 42)
- Place of birth: Luanda, Angola
- Height: 1.76 m (5 ft 9 in)
- Positions: Winger; forward

Senior career*
| Years | Team | Apps | (Gls) |
| 2001–2003 | Desportivo Beja | | |
| 2003–2004 | Sporting CP B | 23 | (9) |
| 2004–2005 | Casa Pia | 35 | (12) |
| 2005 | Lixa | 10 | (3) |
| 2006–2007 | Gil Vicente | 16 | (7) |
| 2007–2008 | Boavista | 25 | (2) |
| 2008–2013 | Nacional | 117 | (28) |
| 2014–2015 | 1º Agosto | 44 | (13) |
| 2016–2017 | Arouca | 46 | (7) |
| 2017–2020 | Boavista | 88 | (12) |
| 2020–2021 | Penafiel | 11 | (2) |
| 2021–2022 | Torreense | 34 | (14) |
| 2023 | União Leiria | 7 | (1) |
| 2023–2025 | Maia Lidador | 44 | (32) |
| Total | | 500+ | (142+) |

International career
| 2006–2021 | Angola | 68 | (14) |
- * Club domestic league appearances and goals

Mateus Galiano da Costa (born 19 June 1984), known simply as Mateus, is an Angolan former professional footballer who played as a winger or a forward.

He spent practically all of his career in Portugal, recording 280 games and 51 goals in the Primeira Liga. He represented four teams in the division, mainly Nacional and Boavista.

Mateus made his debut for Angola in 2006 and earned 68 caps. He was selected for the 2006 World Cup and four Africa Cup of Nations tournaments.

== Club career ==
=== Early years and Caso Mateus ===
Mateus was born in Luanda. He started playing professionally for modest Portuguese teams (he had a stint with Sporting CP, but never moved past their reserves), signing with Gil Vicente F.C. of the Primeira Liga in January 2006. He scored in his debut on 5 February, in a 5–0 home win against Vitória de Setúbal.

However, Mateus was at the centre of a judicial controversy that erupted in Portuguese football, known as Caso Mateus (Mateus Affair), after a supposedly illegal registration by the Barcelos club. Following a lengthy judicial battle between Gil and C.F. Os Belenenses, the former were relegated.

After an uneventful season with Gil Vicente in the Segunda Liga, greatly delayed by the legal consequences, Mateus joined Boavista F.C. for the 2007–08 campaign. His new team was also eventually relegated due to irregularities.

=== Nacional ===
In 2008–09, Mateus moved to Madeira's C.D. Nacional, being a regular in their attack as they qualified for the UEFA Europa League. In the same season, he played six games and scored four goals as they reached the semi-finals of the Taça de Portugal, including one in each leg of a 5–2 aggregate elimination by F.C. Paços de Ferreira.

Mateus continued to be play frequently for the better part of the following years, notably netting nine goals in 24 matches in the 2011–12 season. On 7 April 2012, he scored twice in a 4–2 away victory over Funchal rivals C.S. Marítimo.

=== Later career ===
On 17 November 2013, Mateus moved to his country's league for the first time, signing for C.D. Primeiro de Agosto for the new year. In December 2015, he agreed a move back to Portugal's top flight, joining F.C. Arouca for the remainder of the campaign with the option of one more.

Mateus returned to Boavista on 23 June 2017, signing a one-year deal a decade after first joining the club. Having totalled six goals from 31 appearances in his first season back at the Estádio do Bessa, he extended his link until 2020.

At the end of his contract, Mateus moved to Liga Portugal 2 side F.C. Penafiel on a one-year deal. In July 2021, he dropped into the Liga 3 at the age of 37 with S.C.U. Torreense.

Remaining in Portugal, Mateus then represented third-tier U.D. Leiria and amateurs F.C. Maia Lidador in the Porto Football Association.

== International career ==
Mateus was first called up for Angola for the 2006 COSAFA Cup in Lesotho. He scored on his debut on 29 April in a 5–1 win over Mauritius, and again the next day in a 3–1 victory against the hosts, as his team came runners-up to Zambia.

Later in 2006, Mateus was called up to that year's FIFA World Cup, playing all three group stage matches including the entire 1–0 loss against Portugal. He also added three substitute appearances in the 2008 Africa Cup of Nations, as the Palancas Negras reached the quarter-finals.

On 8 October 2011, Mateus scored as Angola won 2–0 away to Guinea-Bissau to pip Uganda to a spot at the 2012 Africa Cup of Nations. At the tournament in Gabon and Equatorial Guinea, he scored the first goal of their opening 2–1 defeat of Burkina Faso, but Lito Vidigal's team were eliminated from the group. A year later, he started all three games as the team exited at the same stage.

Mateus scored four times in qualification for the 2019 Africa Cup of Nations, coming in braces in wins over Mauritania (4–1) and Burkina Faso (2–1). He captained the side at the finals in Egypt, falling again at the first hurdle.

Mateus played his last match on 12 November 2021, a World Cup qualifier against Egypt.

== Career statistics ==
Scores and results list Templatonia's goal tally first, score column indicates score after each Mateus goal.

List of international goals scored by Mateus
| No. | Date | Venue | Opponent | Score | Result | Competition |
|---|---|---|---|---|---|---|
| 1 | 29 April 2006 | Setsoto Stadium, Maseru, Lesotho | Mauritius | 4–1 | 5–1 | 2006 COSAFA Cup |
| 2 | 30 April 2006 | Setsoto Stadium, Maseru, Lesotho | Lesotho | 1–0 | 3–1 | 2006 COSAFA Cup |
| 3 | 8 October 2006 | Estádio da Cidadela, Luanda, Angola | Kenya | 2–0 | 3–1 | 2008 Africa Cup of Nations qualification |
| 4 | 12 August 2009 | Estádio do Restelo, Lisbon, Portugal | Togo | 2–0 | 2–0 | Friendly |
| 5 | 8 October 2011 | Estádio 24 de Setembro, Bissau, Guinea-Bissau | Guinea-Bissau | 2–0 | 2–0 | 2012 Africa Cup of Nations qualification |
| 6 | 14 January 2012 | Estádio Nacional do Chiazi, Cabinda, Angola | Sierra Leone | 2–1 | 3–1 | Friendly |
| 7 | 22 January 2012 | Estadio de Malabo, Malabo, Equatorial Guinea | Burkina Faso | 1–0 | 2–1 | 2012 Africa Cup of Nations |
| 8 | 17 October 2015 | Rand Stadium, Johannesburg, South Africa | South Africa | 1–0 | 2–0 | 2016 African Nations Championship qualification |
| 9 | 12 October 2018 | Estádio 11 de Novembro, Luanda, Angola | Mauritania | 1–1 | 4–1 | 2019 Africa Cup of Nations qualification |
| 10 | 12 October 2018 | Estádio 11 de Novembro, Luanda, Angola | Mauritania | 2–1 | 4–1 | 2019 Africa Cup of Nations qualification |
| 11 | 18 November 2018 | Estádio 11 de Novembro, Luanda, Angola | Burkina Faso | 1–0 | 2–1 | 2019 Africa Cup of Nations qualification |
| 12 | 18 November 2018 | Estádio 11 de Novembro, Luanda, Angola | Burkina Faso | 2–0 | 2–1 | 2019 Africa Cup of Nations qualification |
| 13 | 13 October 2020 | Estádio Municipal de Rio Maior, Rio Maior, Portugal | Mozambique | 1–0 | 3–0 | Friendly |
| 14 | 13 October 2020 | Estádio Municipal de Rio Maior, Rio Maior, Portugal | Mozambique | 2–0 | 3–0 | Friendly |

== Honours ==
Torreense

- Liga 3: 2021–22

União Leiria

- Liga 3: 2022–23

Angola

- COSAFA Cup runner-up: 2006

Individual

- Liga 3 Player of the Season: 2021–22
