= Locó (footballer) =

Angolan footballer (born 1984)

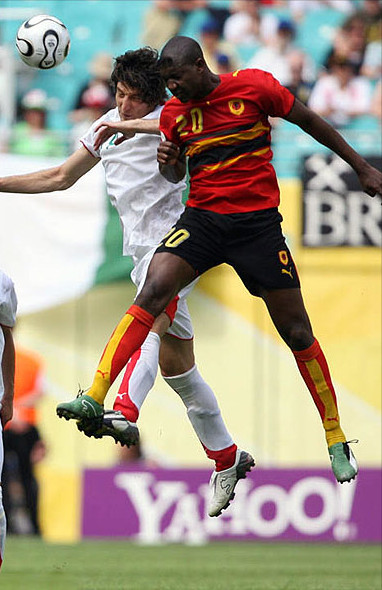
- Locó (2006)

Personal information
- Full name: Manuel Armindo Morais Cange
- Date of birth: 25 December 1984 (age 41)
- Place of birth: Luanda, Angola
- Height: 1.80 m (5 ft 11 in)
- Position: Right back

Senior career*
Years	Team	Apps	(Gls)
2003	Benfica Luanda		
2004	Petro Atlético		
2005	Benfica Luanda		
2006–2008	Primeiro de Agosto		
2009–2011	Petro Atlético		
2012–2014	Santos		

International career^{‡}
2005–2009	Angola	40	(2)
- * Club domestic league appearances and goals as of 2 July 2009 (UTC) ‡ National team caps and goals as of 18 September 2011 (UTC)

Manuel Armindo Morais Cange (born 25 December 1984), commonly known as Locó, is a retired Angolan footballer who last played as a right back for Santos Futebol Clube de Angola.

== International career ==
Locó was a member of his national team, and was called up to the 2006 World Cup.

== National team statistics ==
Angola national team
Year	Apps	Goals
2003	1	0
2005	5	0
2006	14	1
2007	9	0
2008	8	1
2009	3	0
Total	40	2

=== International goals ===
Scores and results list Angola's goal tally first.

No	Date	Venue	Opponent	Score	Result	Competition
1.	3 September 2006	Somhlolo National Stadium, Lobamba, Swaziland	Swaziland	2–0	2–0	2008 Africa Cup of Nations qualification
2.	7 September 2008	Stade de l'Amitié, Cotonou, Benin	Benin	3–2	3–2	2010 FIFA World Cup qualification
