= André Macanga =

Angolan footballer and coach (born 1978)

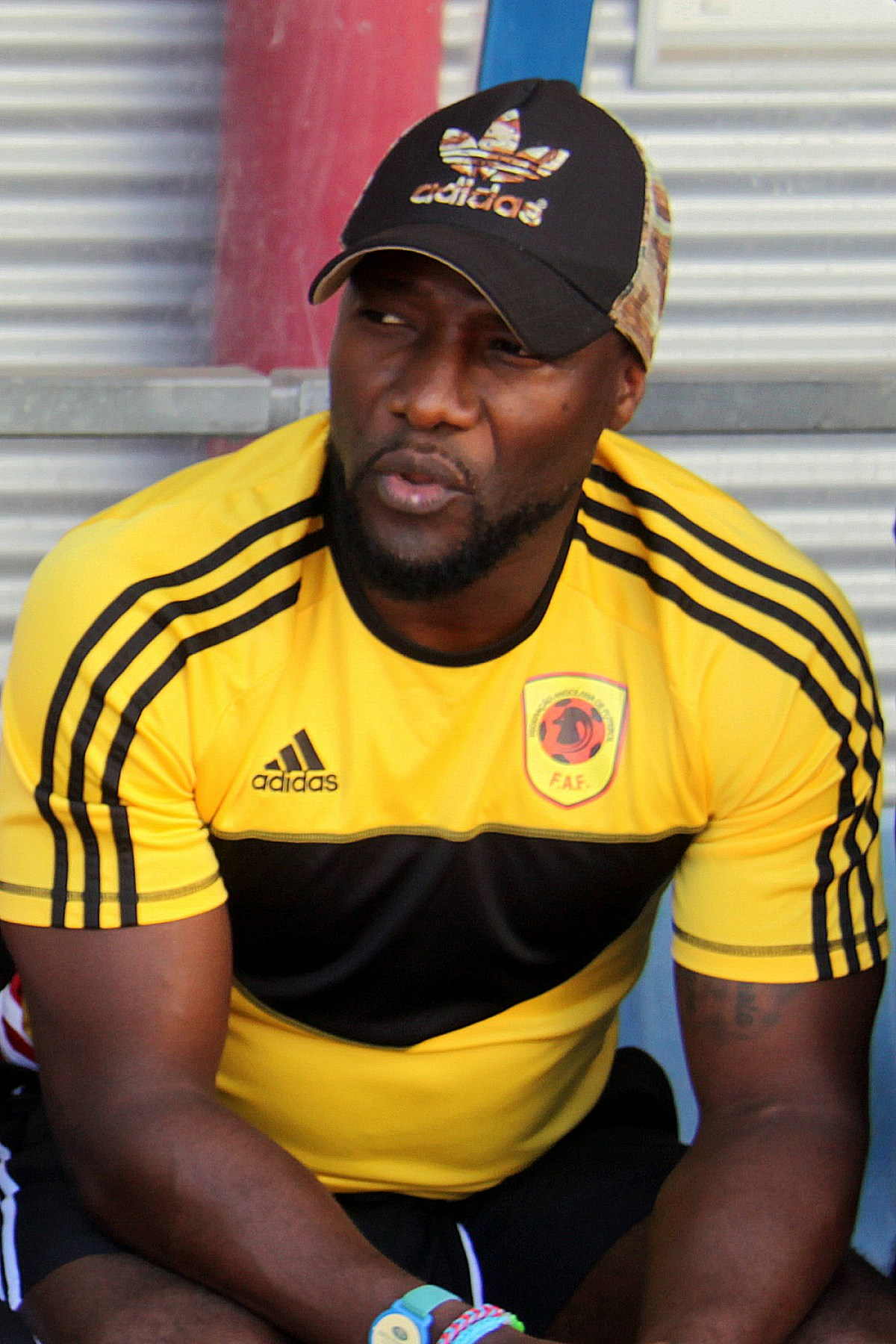
- Macanga with Angola in 2014

Personal information
- Full name: André Venceslau Valentim Macanga
- Date of birth: 14 May 1978 (age 48)
- Place of birth: Luanda, Angola
- Height: 5 ft 9 in (1.75 m)
- Positions: Defensive midfielder; centre-back

Senior career*
Years	Team	Apps	(Gls)
1997–1998	Arrifanense	0	(0)
1998–1999	Vilanovense	0	(0)
1999–2000	Salgueiros	27	(0)
2000–2002	Porto	0	(0)
2000–2001	→ Alverca (loan)	20	(1)
2001–2002	→ Vitória Guimarães (loan)	17	(1)
2002–2003	Académica de Coimbra	32	(4)
2003–2004	Boavista	21	(0)
2004–2005	Gaziantepspor	24	(1)
2006	Al-Salmiya	11	(2)
2006–2010	Al Kuwait	92	(10)
2010–2012	Al Jahra	29	(2)
Total		241	(21)

International career
1999–2012	Angola	70	(2)

Managerial career
- 2013–2016: Angola (assistant)
- 2016–2017: Angola
- 2017–2019: C.R.D. Libolo (assistant)
- 2017–2018: Angola (assistant)
- 2019–2020: C.R.D. Libolo
- 2020–2021: C.D. Huíla
- * Club domestic league appearances and goals

André Venceslau Valentim Macanga (born 14 May 1978) is an Angolan football manager and former football player. During his playing career, he played as a defensive midfielder and represented several clubs in Portugal, Turkey, and Kuwait.

He played for the Angola national team from 1999 to 2012 and participated in several major international tournaments, including the 2006 FIFA World Cup. After retiring, he continued his career in management, serving as an assistant coach and manager of the Angola national team.

== Club career ==
Macanga was born in Luanda, Angola, and moved to Portugal at a young age. After developing through the youth systems of Arrifanense and Vilanovense, he made his professional debut with Salgueiros and attracted attention while playing in the Portuguese top division. In 2000, he signed with Porto, but was unable to establish himself in the first team due to foreign-player registration issues at the time. At his own request, he was loaned to other clubs to gain playing experience.

Remaining under contract with Porto, he played on loan for Alverca, Vitória de Guimarães, and Académica Coimbra in succession, and later also played for Boavista. During this period, Macanga regularly featured as a starter in the Portuguese top division, establishing himself and spending approximately seven seasons in Portugal, where he laid the foundations for his professional career.

In 2004, he left Portugal and moved to Turkey, joining Gaziantepspor and spending one season in the Süper Lig. He subsequently moved to Kuwait, where he joined Al-Salmiya. At the time, Al-Salmiya had gone a long period without winning the league title, but Macanga became a key player for the team and quickly adapted to his new surroundings.

He later moved to Al-Kuwait, where he remained for an extended period and participated in several domestic competitions and Asian club tournaments. Macanga spent approximately six years in Kuwait, the longest period he spent in a single country during his overseas career, and retired from professional football in 2012.

== International career ==
Macanga represented the Angola national team and participated in the 2006 Africa Cup of Nations. At the tournament held in Egypt, Angola were drawn in a group with Cameroon, DR Congo, and Togo. Angola lost to Cameroon, drew with the DR Congo, and then defeated Togo 3–2, finishing third in the group.

In the same year, he also participated in Angola's historic appearance at the 2006 FIFA World Cup. Angola were drawn in Group D with Portugal, Mexico, and Iran, and Macanga played in the matches against Portugal and Mexico. Against Portugal, he started and played the full 90 minutes, but Angola lost 0–1. He also started the second match against Mexico, which ended in a 0–0 draw for Angola.

He continued to be an important member of the national team and also participated in the 2008 Africa Cup of Nations. Angola faced South Africa, Senegal, and Tunisia in the group stage, recording one win and two draws to advance to the quarter-finals. However, they were eliminated after losing 1–2 to Egypt. Macanga played a defensive role for the national team, contributing to maintaining the balance in midfield.

Macanga also participated in the 2012 Africa Cup of Nations, co-hosted by Equatorial Guinea and Gabon. Angola were drawn in Group B with Burkina Faso, Sudan, and Ivory Coast. Macanga started all three matches and wore the captain's armband against Ivory Coast. Angola drew 2–2 with Burkina Faso, defeated Sudan 2–2, and lost 0–2 to Ivory Coast, finishing third in the group with one win, one draw, and one loss and failing to advance to the quarter-finals.

== Career statistics ==
Appearances and goals by national team and year
National team	Year	Apps	Goals
Angola	1999	2	0
Angola	2000	0	0
Angola	2001	1	0
Angola	2002	5	0
Angola	2003	5	0
Angola	2004	7	0
Angola	2005	8	0
Angola	2006	10	0
Angola	2007	4	1
Angola	2008	14	0
Angola	2009	7	1
Angola	2010	1	0
Angola	2011	4	0
Angola	2012	4	0
Total		72	2

Scores and results list Angola's goal tally first, score column indicates score after each Macanga goal.

List of international goals scored by André Macanga
No.	Date	Venue	Opponent	Score	Result	Competition
1	17 November 2007	Stade Paul Fischer, Melun, France	Ivory Coast		2–1	Friendly
2	10 October 2009	Estádio Municipal, Vila Real de Santo António, Portugal	Malta		2–1	Friendly
