= António Mendonça =

Angolan footballer

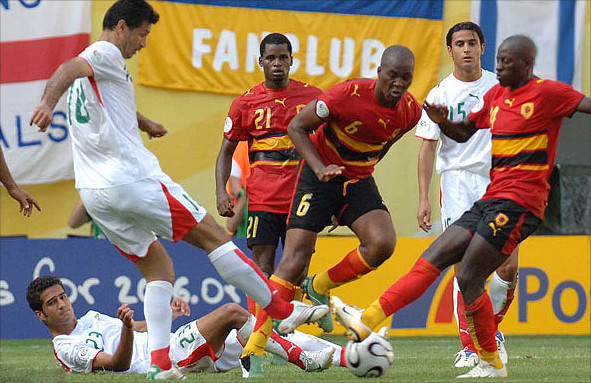

Personal information
- Full name: António Manuel Viana Mendonça
- Date of birth: 9 October 1982 (age 44)
- Place of birth: Luanda, Angola
- Height: 1.72 m (5 ft 7 1/2 in)
- Position: Winger

Senior career*
Years	Team	Apps	(Gls)
1999	1º Agosto		
2000–2007	Varzim	189	(25)
2003	→ Chaves (loan)	15	(0)
2007–2008	Belenenses	5	(0)
2008	→ Estrela Amadora (loan)	9	(1)
2008–2009	Varzim	17	(6)
2009	Interclube		
2010–2012	1º Agosto		
2011	→ Santos Angola (loan)		
2012	→ Bravos do Maquis (loan)		
2013–2014	Santos Angola	27	(5)

International career
1999–2009	Angola	54	(6)
- * Club domestic league appearances and goals

António Manuel Viana Mendonça (born 9 October 1982) is an Angolan retired footballer who played as a right winger.

== Club career ==
Born in Luanda, Mendonça moved to Portugal in January 2000 at only 17, signing with Varzim in the second division, and scored ten goals in 30 games in his first full season to help to Primeira Liga promotion. He appeared in 28 matches in the following campaign (18 starts, two goals), with the Póvoa do Varzim side retaining their league status.

From 2003 to 2007, after a brief loan, Mendonça appeared regularly for Varzim, with the club again in the second level. He returned to the top flight in 2007–08, but played in only 14 games for Belenenses and Estrela Amadora combined, which prompted a return to his previous team, still in division two; whilst with Varzim, on 10 February 2007, he scored the 2–1 home winner that ousted giants Benfica from the Taça de Portugal.

In the 2009 offseason, Mendonça returned to his country and signed with Interclube. The following year he joined 1º Agosto, his first club as a senior.

== International career ==
Mendonça made his debut for Angola in April 1999, before his 17th birthday. He was chosen the best player at the 2001 African Youth Championship.

Mendonça was picked for the squad that appeared at the 2006 FIFA World Cup, a first-ever for the country. He played in all three group stage games – 270 minutes – as the Palancas Negras managed two points; additionally, he participated in two Africa Cup of Nations tournaments.

=== International goals ===
Scores and results list Angola's goal tally first.

No	Date	Venue	Opponent	Score	Result	Competition
1.	24 April 1999	Kamuzu Stadium, Blantyre, Malawi	Malawi	1–1	2–1	1999 COSAFA Cup
2.	16 July 2000	Estádio da Cidadela, Luanda, Luanda	Equatorial Guinea	3–1	4–1	2002 Africa Cup of Nations qualification
3.	10 October 2000	Estádio da Cidadela, Luanda, Angola	Algeria	2–2	2–2	2002 Africa Cup of Nations qualification
4.	14 November 2001	Estádio José Alvalade, Lisbon, Portugal	Portugal	1–0	1–5	Friendly
5.	25 March 2007	Estádio da Cidadela, Luanda, Angola	Eritrea	4–0	6–1	2008 Africa Cup of Nations qualification
6.	1 June 2008	Estádio dos Coqueiros, Luanda, Angola	Benin	3–0	3–0	2010 World Cup qualification
