= Oliveira Gonçalves =

Angolan football coach

Luís de Oliveira Gonçalves
Personal information
- Full name: Luís de Oliveira Gonçalves
- Date of birth: 22 June 1960 (age 66)
- Place of birth: Luanda, Angola

Managerial career
- Years: Team
- 2003–2008: Angola

Luís de Oliveira Gonçalves (born 22 June 1960) is an Angolan football coach who coached the Angola national football team.
