= Ghana at the FIFA World Cup =

International football delegation

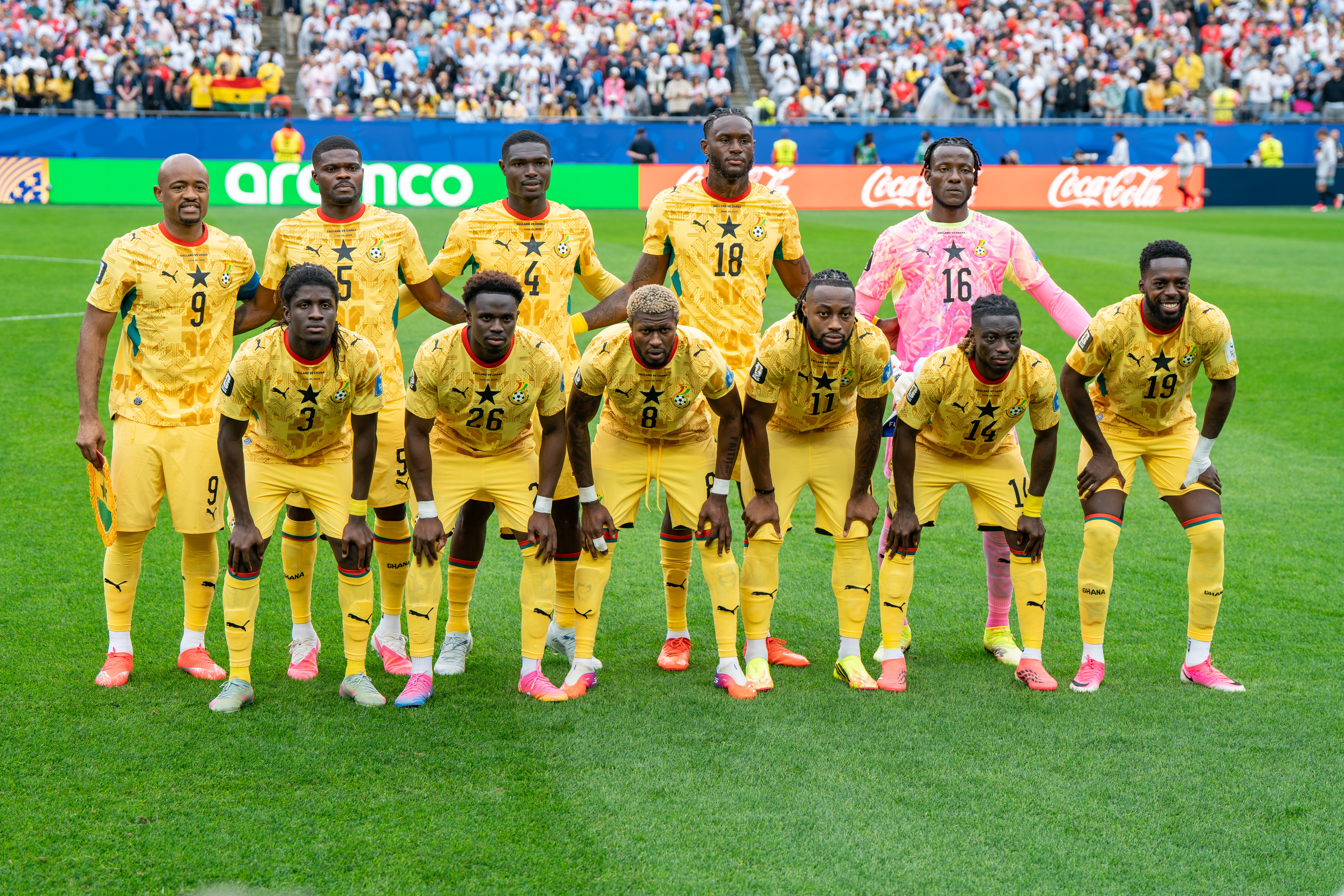
Ghana at the 2026 FIFA World Cup.

Ghana have appeared in the finals of the FIFA World Cup on five occasions, in 2006, 2010 (where they reached the quarter-finals), 2014, 2022 and 2026.

== Record at the FIFA World Cup ==
=== Overall record ===
Ghana have qualified for five FIFA World Cup tournaments; 2006, 2010, 2014, 2022 and 2026.

In 2006, Ghana were the only African side to advance to the second round of the tournament, and were the sixth nation in a row from Africa to progress beyond the group stages of the World Cup. Ghana had the youngest team in the competition with an average age of 23 years and 352 days, and were praised for their improving performance. FIFA ranked Ghana 13th out of the 32 countries who competed in the tournament.

In the 2010 World Cup, Ghana progressed beyond the group stage and reached the quarter-finals, where they were eliminated by Uruguay. Ghana was defeated by Uruguay on penalties after Luis Suárez controversially handballed on the goal line deep into extra time, denying Ghana an almost certain winning goal. Had Ghana won their quarter-final, they would have become the first African nation to progress to the semi-finals of the world cup. Of the 32 countries that participated in the 2010 FIFA World Cup, FIFA ranked Ghana 7th.

In the 2014 and 2022 World Cup, Ghana was eliminated in the group stage. In 2026, they were eliminated in the round of 32.

FIFA World Cup record
Year	Round	Position	Pld	W	D	L	GF	GA
(Uruguay) 1930	Did not enter							
(Italy) 1934	Did not enter							
(France) 1938	Did not enter							
(Brazil) 1950	Did not enter							
(Switzerland) 1954	Did not enter							
(Sweden) 1958	Did not enter							
(Chile) 1962	Did not qualify							
(England) 1966	Withdrew							
(Mexico) 1970	Did not qualify							
(West Germany) 1974	Did not qualify							
(Argentina) 1978	Did not qualify							
(Spain) 1982	Withdrew							
(Mexico) 1986	Did not qualify							
(Italy) 1990	Did not qualify							
(United States) 1994	Did not qualify							
(France) 1998	Did not qualify							
(South Korea) (Japan) 2002	Did not qualify							
(Germany) 2006	Round of 16	13th	4	2	0	2	4	6
(South Africa) 2010	Quarter-finals	7th	5	2	2	1	5	4
(Brazil) 2014	Group stage	25th	3	0	1	2	4	6
(Russia) 2018	Did not qualify							
(Qatar) 2022	Group stage	24th	3	1	0	2	5	7
(Canada) (Mexico) (United States) 2026	Round of 32	24th	4	1	1	2	2	3
(Morocco) (Portugal) (Spain) 2030	To be determined							
(Saudi Arabia) 2034	To be determined							
Total	Quarter-finals	5/23	19	6	4	9	20	26

=== By match ===
World Cup	Round	Opponent	Score	Result	Venue	Ghana scorers
2006	Group E	Italy	0–2	L	Hanover	—
2006	Group E	Czech Republic	2–0	W	Cologne	A. Gyan, S. Muntari
2006	Group E	United States	2–1	W	Nuremberg	H. Draman, S. Appiah
2006	Round of 16	Brazil	0–3	L	Dortmund	—
2010	Group D	Serbia	1–0	W	Pretoria	A. Gyan
2010	Group D	Australia	1–1	D	Rustenburg	A. Gyan
2010	Group D	Germany	0–1	L	Johannesburg	—
2010	Round of 16	United States	2–1 (a.e.t.)	W	Rustenburg	K. P. Boateng, A. Gyan
2010	Quarter-finals	Uruguay	1–1 (a.e.t.) 2–4 p	D	Johannesburg	S. Muntari
2014	Group G	United States	1–2	L	Natal	A. Ayew
2014	Group G	Germany	2–2	D	Fortaleza	A. Ayew, A. Gyan
2014	Group G	Portugal	1–2	L	Brasília	A. Gyan
2022	Group H	Portugal	2–3	L	Doha	A. Ayew, O. Bukari
2022	Group H	South Korea	3–2	W	Al Rayyan	M. Salisu, M. Kudus (2)
2022	Group H	Uruguay	0–2	L	Al Wakrah	—
2026	Group L	Panama	1–0	W	Toronto	C. Yirenkyi
2026	Group L	England	0–0	D	Foxborough	—
2026	Group L	Croatia	1–2	L	Philadelphia	D. Luckassen
2026	Round of 32	Colombia	0–1	L	Kansas City	—

== Head-to-head record ==
Opponent	Pld	W	D	L	GF	GA	GD	Win %
Australia	1	0	1	0	1	1	+0	0.00
Brazil	1	0	0	1	0	3	−3	0.00
Colombia	1	0	0	1	0	1	−1	0.00
Croatia	1	0	0	1	1	2	−1	0.00
Czech Republic	1	1	0	0	2	0	+2	100.00
England	1	0	1	0	0	0	+0	0.00
Germany	2	0	1	1	2	3	−1	0.00
Italy	1	0	0	1	0	2	−2	0.00
Panama	1	1	0	0	1	0	+1	100.00
Portugal	2	0	0	2	3	5	−2	0.00
Serbia	1	1	0	0	1	0	+1	100.00
South Korea	1	1	0	0	3	2	+1	100.00
United States	3	2	0	1	5	4	+1	66.67
Uruguay	2	0	1	1	1	3	−2	0.00
Total	19	6	4	9	20	26	−6	31.58

== Participations ==
=== Germany 2006 ===
Head coach: (Serbia) Ratomir Dujković

No.	Pos.	Player	Date of birth (age)	Caps	Club
1	GK	Sammy Adjei	1 September 1980 (aged 25)	31	(Israel) F.C. Ashdod
2	MF	Hans Sarpei	28 June 1976 (aged 29)	7	(Germany) VfL Wolfsburg
3	FW	Asamoah Gyan	22 November 1985 (aged 20)	13	(Italy) Udinese
4	DF	Samuel Kuffour	3 September 1976 (aged 29)	58	(Italy) Roma
5	DF	John Mensah	29 November 1982 (aged 23)	33	(France) Rennes
6	DF	Emmanuel Pappoe	3 March 1981 (aged 25)	27	(Israel) Hapoel Kfar Saba
7	DF	Illiasu Shilla	26 October 1982 (aged 23)	2	(Ghana) Asante Kotoko
8	MF	Michael Essien	3 December 1982 (aged 23)	17	(England) Chelsea
9	MF	Derek Boateng	2 May 1983 (aged 23)	11	(Sweden) AIK
10	MF	Stephen Appiah (c)	24 December 1980 (aged 25)	42	(Turkey) Fenerbahçe
11	MF	Sulley Muntari	27 August 1984 (aged 21)	16	(Italy) Udinese
12	FW	Alex Tachie-Mensah	15 February 1977 (aged 29)	5	(Switzerland) St. Gallen
13	DF	Habib Mohamed	10 December 1983 (aged 22)	1	(Ghana) King Faisal Babes
14	FW	Matthew Amoah	24 October 1980 (aged 25)	16	(Germany) Borussia Dortmund
15	MF	John Paintsil	15 June 1981 (aged 24)	21	(Israel) Hapoel Tel Aviv
16	GK	George Owu	17 June 1982 (aged 23)	6	(Ghana) Ashanti Gold
17	DF	Daniel Quaye	25 December 1980 (aged 25)	7	(Ghana) Hearts of Oak
18	DF	Eric Addo	12 November 1978 (aged 27)	6	(Netherlands) PSV Eindhoven
19	FW	Razak Pimpong	30 December 1982 (aged 23)	4	(Denmark) Copenhagen
20	FW	Otto Addo	9 June 1975 (aged 31)	13	(Germany) Mainz 05
21	DF	Issah Ahmed	24 May 1982 (aged 24)	10	(Denmark) Randers
22	GK	Richard Kingson	13 June 1978 (aged 27)	33	(Turkey) Ankaraspor
23	MF	Haminu Dramani	1 April 1986 (aged 20)	7	(Serbia) Red Star Belgrade

==== Italy vs Ghana ====
12 June 2006
21:00

Italy	2–0	Ghana
Pirlo 40'; Iaquinta 83'	Report

FIFA WM Stadion Hannover, Hanover
Attendance: 43,000
Referee: Carlos Simon (Brazil)

Italy	Ghana

GK	1	Gianluigi Buffon
RB	2	Cristian Zaccardo
CB	13	Alessandro Nesta
CB	5	Fabio Cannavaro (c)
LB	3	Fabio Grosso
DM	21	Andrea Pirlo
RM	20	Simone Perrotta
LM	4	Daniele De Rossi	(yellow card) 10'
AM	10	Francesco Totti		(substituted off) 56'
CF	11	Alberto Gilardino		(substituted off) 64'
CF	9	Luca Toni		(substituted off) 82'
Substitutions:
MF	16	Mauro Camoranesi	(yellow card) 62'	(substituted on) 56'
FW	15	Vincenzo Iaquinta	(yellow card) 88'	(substituted on) 64'
FW	7	Alessandro Del Piero		(substituted on) 82'
Manager:
Marcello Lippi

GK	22	Richard Kingson
RB	15	John Paintsil
CB	4	Samuel Kuffour
CB	5	John Mensah
LB	6	Emmanuel Pappoe		(substituted off) 46'
RM	18	Eric Addo
CM	8	Michael Essien
CM	10	Stephen Appiah (c)
LM	11	Sulley Muntari	(yellow card) 41'
CF	14	Matthew Amoah		(substituted off) 68'
CF	3	Asamoah Gyan	(yellow card) 65'	(substituted off) 89'
Substitutions:
DF	7	Illiasu Shilla		(substituted on) 46'
FW	19	Razak Pimpong		(substituted on) 68'
FW	12	Alex Tachie-Mensah		(substituted on) 89'
Manager:
(Serbia) Ratomir Dujković

Man of the Match:
Andrea Pirlo (Italy)

Assistant referees:
Aristeu Tavares (Brazil)
Ednílson Corona (Brazil)
Fourth official:
Khalil Al Ghamdi (Saudi Arabia)
Fifth official:
Hamdi Al Kadri (Syria)

==== Czech Republic vs Ghana ====
Asamoah Gyan opened the scoring with a low left footed shot to the net from the edge of the penalty area. Gyan then missed a penalty in the second half when he hit his shot against the post in the 66th minute. Sulley Muntari got the second goal for Ghana in the 82nd minute, finishing a move with a left footed shot to the roof of the net from inside the penalty area.

17 June 2006
18:00

Czech Republic	0–2	Ghana
	Report	Gyan 2'; Muntari 82'

FIFA WM Stadion Köln, Cologne
Attendance: 45,000
Referee: Horacio Elizondo (Argentina)

Czech Republic	Ghana

GK	1	Petr Čech
RB	2	Zdeněk Grygera
CB	21	Tomáš Ujfaluši	(red card) 65'
CB	22	David Rozehnal
LB	6	Marek Jankulovski
DM	4	Tomáš Galásek (c)		(substituted off) 46'
RM	8	Karel Poborský		(substituted off) 56'
CM	10	Tomáš Rosický
CM	11	Pavel Nedvěd
LM	20	Jaroslav Plašil		(substituted off) 68'
CF	12	Vratislav Lokvenc	(yellow card) 49'
Substitutions:
MF	19	Jan Polák		(substituted on) 46'
MF	17	Jiří Štajner		(substituted on) 56'
FW	7	Libor Sionko		(substituted on) 68'
Manager:
Karel Brückner

GK	22	Richard Kingson
RB	15	John Paintsil
CB	5	John Mensah
CB	7	Illiasu Shilla
LB	13	Habib Mohamed	(yellow card) 90+3'
RM	20	Otto Addo	(yellow card) 18'	(substituted off) 46'
CM	8	Michael Essien	(yellow card) 37'
CM	10	Stephen Appiah (c)
LM	11	Sulley Muntari	(yellow card) 84'
CF	14	Matthew Amoah		(substituted off) 80'
CF	3	Asamoah Gyan	(yellow card) 66'	(substituted off) 85'
Substitutions:
MF	9	Derek Boateng	(yellow card) 75'	(substituted on) 46'
MF	18	Eric Addo		(substituted on) 80'
FW	19	Razak Pimpong		(substituted on) 85'
Manager:
(Serbia) Ratomir Dujković

Man of the Match:
Michael Essien (Ghana)

Assistant referees:
Darío García (Argentina)
Rodolfo Otero (Argentina)
Fourth official:
Jerome Damon (South Africa)
Fifth official:
Enock Molefe (South Africa)

==== Ghana vs United States ====
Ghana opened the scoring in the 22nd minute when Haminu Draman curled a low right footed shot past the goalkeeper from the left of the penalty area. The winning goal for Ghana was a penalty at the end of the first half which Stephen Appiah shot high right footed to the goalkeepers right.

22 June 2006
16:00

Ghana	2–1	United States
Draman 22'; Appiah 45+2' (pen.)	Report	Dempsey 43'

FIFA WM Stadion Nürnberg, Nuremberg
Attendance: 41,000
Referee: Markus Merk (Germany)

Ghana	United States

GK	22	Richard Kingson
RB	15	John Paintsil
CB	5	John Mensah	(yellow card) 81'
CB	7	Illiasu Shilla	(yellow card) 32'
LB	13	Habib Mohamed
DM	8	Michael Essien	(yellow card) 5'
RM	9	Derek Boateng		(substituted off) 46'
LM	23	Haminu Draman		(substituted off) 80'
AM	10	Stephen Appiah (c)	(yellow card) 90+1'
CF	14	Matthew Amoah		(substituted off) 59'
CF	19	Razak Pimpong
Substitutions:
MF	20	Otto Addo		(substituted on) 46'
MF	18	Eric Addo		(substituted on) 59'
FW	12	Alex Tachie-Mensah		(substituted on) 80'
Manager:
(Serbia) Ratomir Dujković

GK	18	Kasey Keller
RB	6	Steve Cherundolo		(substituted off) 61'
CB	13	Jimmy Conrad
CB	22	Oguchi Onyewu
LB	3	Carlos Bocanegra
DM	10	Claudio Reyna (c)		(substituted off) 40'
RM	8	Clint Dempsey
LM	7	Eddie Lewis	(yellow card) 7'	(substituted off) 74'
AM	21	Landon Donovan
CF	17	DaMarcus Beasley
CF	20	Brian McBride
Substitutions:
MF	14	Ben Olsen		(substituted on) 40'
FW	9	Eddie Johnson		(substituted on) 61'
MF	15	Bobby Convey		(substituted on) 74'
Manager:
Bruce Arena

Man of the Match:
Stephen Appiah (Ghana)

Assistant referees:
Christian Schräer (Germany)
Jan-Hendrik Salver (Germany)
Fourth official:
Toru Kamikawa (Japan)
Fifth official:
Yoshikazu Hiroshima (Japan)

==== Brazil vs Ghana Second Round Match ====
27 June 2006
17:00

Brazil	3–0	Ghana
Ronaldo 5'; Adriano 45+1'; Zé Roberto 84'	Report

FIFA WM-Stadion Dortmund, Dortmund
Attendance: 65,000
Referee: Ľuboš Micheľ (Slovakia)

Brazil	Ghana

GK	1	Dida
RB	2	Cafu (c)
CB	3	Lúcio
CB	4	Juan	(yellow card) 44'
LB	6	Roberto Carlos
CM	5	Emerson		(substituted off) 46'
CM	11	Zé Roberto
AM	8	Kaká		(substituted off) 83'
AM	10	Ronaldinho
CF	7	Adriano	(yellow card) 13'	(substituted off) 61'
CF	9	Ronaldo
Substitutions:
MF	17	Gilberto Silva		(substituted on) 46'
MF	19	Juninho		(substituted on) 61'
MF	20	Ricardinho		(substituted on) 83'
Manager:
Carlos Alberto Parreira

GK	22	Richard Kingson
RB	15	John Paintsil	(yellow card) 29'
CB	5	John Mensah
CB	7	Illiasu Shilla
LB	6	Emmanuel Pappoe
RM	11	Sulley Muntari	(yellow card) 11'
CM	10	Stephen Appiah (c)	(yellow card) 7'
CM	18	Eric Addo	(yellow card) 38'	(substituted off) 60'
LM	23	Haminu Dramani
CF	14	Matthew Amoah		(substituted off) 70'
CF	3	Asamoah Gyan	(yellow card) 48' (yellow-red card) 81'
Substitutions:
MF	9	Derek Boateng		(substituted on) 60'
FW	12	Alex Tachie-Mensah		(substituted on) 70'
Manager:
(Serbia and Montenegro) Ratomir Dujković

Man of the Match:
Zé Roberto (Brazil)

Assistant referees:
Roman Slysko (Slovakia)
Martin Balko (Slovakia)
Fourth official:
Mark Shield (Australia)
Fifth official:
Nathan Gibson (Australia)

=== South Africa 2010 ===
Coach: (Serbia) Milovan Rajevac

No.	Pos.	Player	Date of birth (age)	Caps	Club
1	GK	Daniel Adjei	10 November 1989 (aged 20)	2	(Ghana) Liberty Professionals
2	DF	Hans Sarpei	28 June 1976 (aged 33)	23	(Germany) Bayer Leverkusen
3	FW	Asamoah Gyan	22 November 1985 (aged 24)	32	(France) Rennes
4	DF	John Paintsil	15 June 1981 (aged 28)	65	(England) Fulham
5	DF	John Mensah (c)	29 November 1982 (aged 27)	58	(England) Sunderland
6	MF	Anthony Annan	21 July 1986 (aged 23)	38	(Norway) Rosenborg
7	DF	Samuel Inkoom	22 August 1989 (aged 20)	15	(Switzerland) Basel
8	DF	Jonathan Mensah	13 July 1990 (aged 19)	3	(Spain) Granada
9	MF	Derek Boateng	2 April 1983 (aged 27)	19	(Spain) Getafe
10	MF	Stephen Appiah	24 December 1980 (aged 29)	56	(Italy) Bologna
11	MF	Sulley Muntari	27 August 1984 (aged 25)	52	(Italy) Internazionale
12	FW	Prince Tagoe	9 November 1986 (aged 23)	17	(Germany) 1899 Hoffenheim
13	MF	André Ayew	17 December 1989 (aged 20)	15	(France) Arles-Avignon
14	FW	Matthew Amoah	24 October 1980 (aged 29)	31	(Netherlands) NAC
15	DF	Isaac Vorsah	21 June 1988 (aged 21)	6	(Germany) 1899 Hoffenheim
16	GK	Stephen Ahorlu	10 May 1989 (aged 21)	0	(Ghana) Heart of Lions
17	DF	Abdul Rahim Ayew	16 April 1988 (aged 22)	6	(Egypt) Zamalek
18	FW	Dominic Adiyiah	29 November 1989 (aged 20)	4	(Italy) Milan
19	DF	Lee Addy	26 September 1985 (aged 24)	3	(Ghana) Bechem Chelsea
20	MF	Quincy Owusu-Abeyie	15 April 1986 (aged 24)	12	(Qatar) Al-Sadd
21	MF	Kwadwo Asamoah	9 September 1988 (aged 21)	29	(Italy) Udinese
22	GK	Richard Kingson	13 June 1978 (aged 31)	58	(England) Wigan Athletic
23	MF	Kevin-Prince Boateng	6 March 1987 (aged 23)	0	(England) Portsmouth

==== Serbia vs Ghana ====
Asamoah Gyan scored only goal of the game came in the 85th minute from the penalty spot, shooting to the goalkeepers right after a handball offence by Zdravko Kuzmanovic.

13 June 2010
16:00

Serbia	0–1	Ghana
	Report	Gyan 85' (pen.)

Loftus Versfeld Stadium, Pretoria
Attendance: 38,833
Referee: Héctor Baldassi (Argentina)

Serbia	Ghana

GK	1	Vladimir Stojković
RB	6	Branislav Ivanović
CB	13	Aleksandar Luković	(yellow card) 54' (yellow-red card) 74'
CB	5	Nemanja Vidić
LB	3	Aleksandar Kolarov
CM	11	Nenad Milijaš		(substituted off) 62'
CM	10	Dejan Stanković (c)
RW	17	Miloš Krasić
LW	14	Milan Jovanović		(substituted off) 76'
SS	9	Marko Pantelić
CF	15	Nikola Žigić	(yellow card) 19'	(substituted off) 69'
Substitutions:
MF	22	Zdravko Kuzmanović	(yellow card) 83'	(substituted on) 62'
FW	8	Danko Lazović		(substituted on) 69'
DF	20	Neven Subotić		(substituted on) 76'
Manager:
Radomir Antić

GK	22	Richard Kingson
RB	4	John Paintsil
CB	15	Isaac Vorsah	(yellow card) 26'
CB	5	John Mensah (c)
LB	2	Hans Sarpei
CM	6	Anthony Annan
CM	23	Kevin-Prince Boateng		(substituted off) 90+1'
RW	12	Prince Tagoe	(yellow card) 89'
AM	21	Kwadwo Asamoah		(substituted off) 73'
LW	13	André Ayew
CF	3	Asamoah Gyan		(substituted off) 90+3'
Substitutions:
MF	10	Stephen Appiah		(substituted on) 73'
DF	19	Lee Addy		(substituted on) 90+1'
MF	20	Quincy Owusu-Abeyie		(substituted on) 90+3'
Manager:
(Serbia) Milovan Rajevac

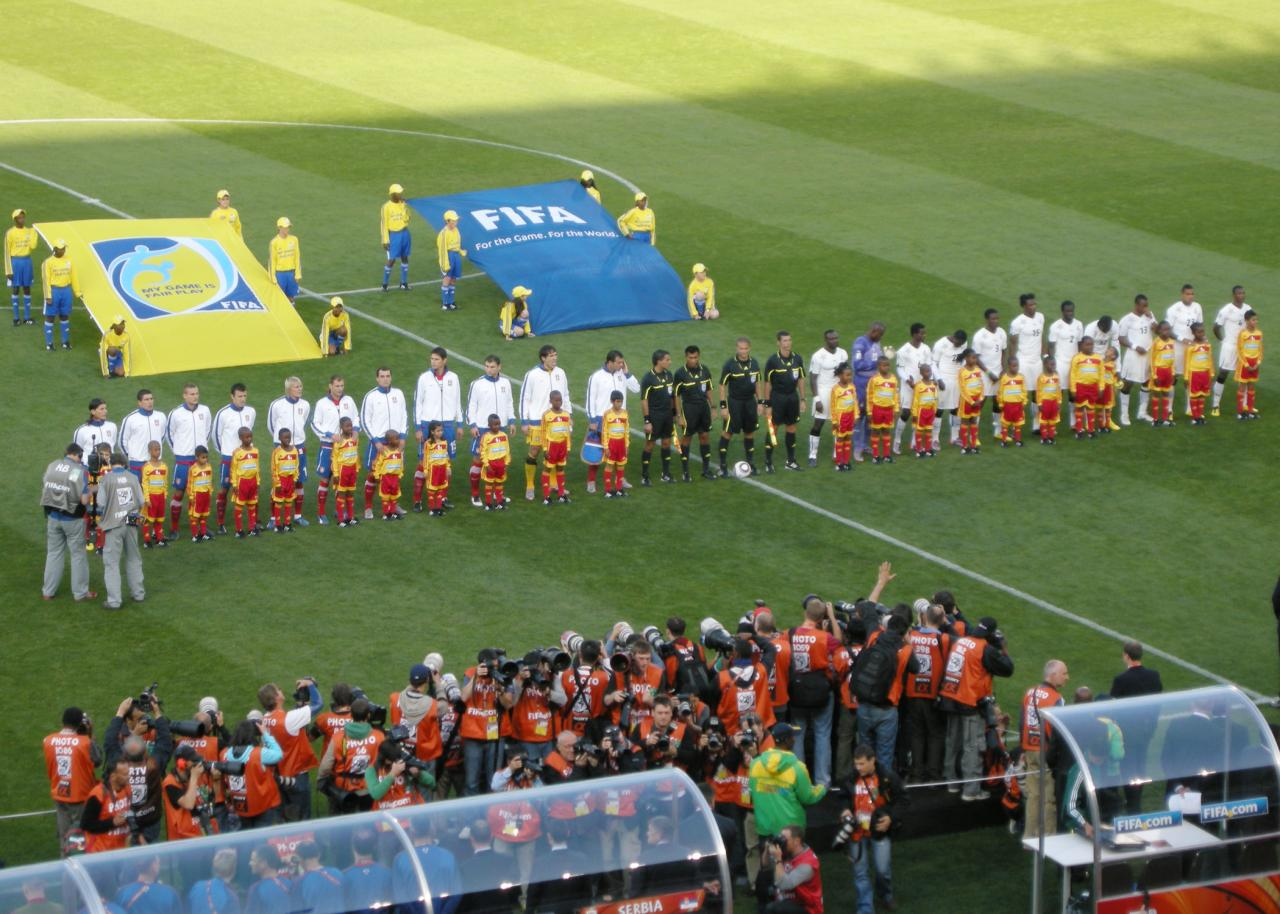
Ghana vs. Serbia in the 2010 FIFA World Cup group D match at Loftus Versfeld Stadium, Pretoria on 13 June 2010.

Man of the Match:
Asamoah Gyan (Ghana)

Assistant referees:
Ricardo Casas (Argentina)
Hernán Maidana (Argentina)
Fourth official:
Subkhiddin Mohd Salleh (Malaysia)
Fifth official:
Jeffrey Gek Pheng (Singapore)

==== Ghana vs Australia ====
Asamoah Gyan scored the equalizer for Ghana in the 25th minute from the penalty spot, shooting low to the goalkeepers left after a handball by Harry Kewell on the goal-line for which he was shown a straight red card.

19 June 2010
16:00

Ghana	1–1	Australia
Gyan 25' (pen.)	Report	Holman 11'

Royal Bafokeng Stadium, Rustenburg
Attendance: 34,812
Referee: Roberto Rosetti (Italy)

Ghana	Australia

GK	22	Richard Kingson (c)
RB	4	John Paintsil
CB	8	Jonathan Mensah	(yellow card) 79'
CB	19	Lee Addy	(yellow card) 40'
LB	2	Hans Sarpei
DM	6	Anthony Annan	(yellow card) 84'
CM	23	Kevin-Prince Boateng		(substituted off) 87'
RW	12	Prince Tagoe		(substituted off) 56'
AM	21	Kwadwo Asamoah		(substituted off) 77'
LW	13	André Ayew
CF	3	Asamoah Gyan
Substitutions:
MF	20	Quincy Owusu-Abeyie		(substituted on) 56'
MF	11	Sulley Muntari		(substituted on) 77'
FW	14	Matthew Amoah		(substituted on) 87'
Manager:
(Serbia) Milovan Rajevac

GK	1	Mark Schwarzer
RB	8	Luke Wilkshire		(substituted off) 84'
CB	2	Lucas Neill (c)
CB	3	Craig Moore	(yellow card) 85'
LB	21	David Carney
CM	5	Jason Culina
CM	16	Carl Valeri
RW	7	Brett Emerton
AM	14	Brett Holman		(substituted off) 68'
LW	23	Mark Bresciano		(substituted off) 66'
CF	10	Harry Kewell	(red card) 24'
Substitutions:
DF	11	Scott Chipperfield		(substituted on) 66'
FW	9	Joshua Kennedy		(substituted on) 68'
FW	17	Nikita Rukavytsya		(substituted on) 84'
Manager:
(Netherlands) Pim Verbeek

Man of the Match:
Asamoah Gyan (Ghana)

Assistant referees:
Paolo Calcagno (Italy)
Stefano Ayroldi (Italy)
Fourth official:
Carlos Simon (Brazil)
Fifth official:
Altemir Hausmann (Brazil)

==== Ghana vs Germany ====
23 June 2010
20:30

Ghana	0–1	Germany
	Report	Özil 60'

Soccer City, Johannesburg
Attendance: 83,391
Referee: Carlos Simon (Brazil)

Ghana	Germany

GK	22	Richard Kingson
RB	4	John Paintsil
CB	5	John Mensah (c)
CB	8	Jonathan Mensah
LB	2	Hans Sarpei
DM	6	Anthony Annan
CM	23	Kevin-Prince Boateng
CM	21	Kwadwo Asamoah
RW	12	Prince Tagoe		(substituted off) 64'
LW	13	André Ayew	(yellow card) 40'	(substituted off) 90+2'
CF	3	Asamoah Gyan		(substituted off) 82'
Substitutions:
MF	11	Sulley Muntari		(substituted on) 64'
FW	14	Matthew Amoah		(substituted on) 82'
FW	18	Dominic Adiyiah		(substituted on) 90+2'
Manager:
(Serbia) Milovan Rajevac

GK	1	Manuel Neuer
RB	16	Philipp Lahm (c)
CB	17	Per Mertesacker
CB	3	Arne Friedrich
LB	20	Jérôme Boateng		(substituted off) 73'
CM	7	Bastian Schweinsteiger		(substituted off) 81'
CM	6	Sami Khedira
RW	13	Thomas Müller	(yellow card) 43'	(substituted off) 67'
AM	8	Mesut Özil
LW	10	Lukas Podolski
CF	19	Cacau
Substitutions:
MF	15	Piotr Trochowski		(substituted on) 67'
MF	2	Marcell Jansen		(substituted on) 73'
MF	18	Toni Kroos		(substituted on) 81'
Manager:
Joachim Löw

Man of the Match:
Mesut Özil (Germany)

Assistant referees:
Altemir Hausmann (Brazil)
Roberto Braatz (Brazil)
Fourth official:
Martín Vázquez (Uruguay)
Fifth official:
Carlos Pastorino (Uruguay)

==== United States vs Ghana ====
United States vs Ghana was played on 26 June 2010 at the Royal Bafokeng Stadium in Rustenburg. The match was watched by 19 million Americans, making it the most watched association football match in American television history. The match was won by Ghana in extra time, after Asamoah Gyan broke a 1–1 deadlock. Kevin-Prince Boateng scored the opening goal of the match for Ghana in the 5th minute. The goal followed an error by Ricardo Clark, who lost the ball to Ghana in midfield. Boateng took the ball to the edge of the penalty area, beating US goalkeeper Tim Howard with a low left foot shot. Landon Donovan equalised with a penalty kick in the 62nd minute, awarded after Jonathan Mensah fouled Clint Dempsey. The US had chances to win the game thereafter, but they were unable to get past Ghana's goalkeeper Richard Kingson. The match thus went to extra time. In the third minute, Gyan latched onto a high long ball, chesting it down and holding off two defenders before scoring the winner. After the match, Ghana's coach Milovan Rajevac hailed his side's achievement in becoming one of the "best eight teams in the world", but regretted the number of players that would miss the quarter-final against Uruguay because of injury or suspension. The president of the Soccer Federation, Sunil Gulati, lamented the team's failure to make the quarter-finals and thereby further raise the profile of the sport in the US.

26 June 2010
20:30

United States	1–2 (a.e.t.)	Ghana
Donovan 62' (pen.)	Report	Boateng 5'; Gyan 93'

Royal Bafokeng Stadium, Rustenburg
Attendance: 34,976
Referee: Viktor Kassai (Hungary)

United States	Ghana

GK	1	Tim Howard
RB	6	Steve Cherundolo	(yellow card) 18'
CB	15	Jay DeMerit
CB	3	Carlos Bocanegra (c)	(yellow card) 68'
LB	12	Jonathan Bornstein
CM	4	Michael Bradley
CM	13	Ricardo Clark	(yellow card) 7'	(substituted off) 31'
RW	8	Clint Dempsey
LW	10	Landon Donovan
CF	17	Jozy Altidore		(substituted off) 91'
CF	20	Robbie Findley		(substituted off) 46'
Substitutions:
MF	19	Maurice Edu		(substituted on) 31'
MF	22	Benny Feilhaber		(substituted on) 46'
FW	9	Herculez Gomez		(substituted on) 91'
Manager:
Bob Bradley

GK	22	Richard Kingson
CB	4	John Paintsil
CB	5	John Mensah (c)
CB	8	Jonathan Mensah	(yellow card) 61'
RWB	7	Samuel Inkoom		(substituted off) 113'
LWB	2	Hans Sarpei		(substituted off) 73'
CM	6	Anthony Annan
CM	23	Kevin-Prince Boateng		(substituted off) 78'
RW	21	Kwadwo Asamoah
LW	13	André Ayew	(yellow card) 90+2'
CF	3	Asamoah Gyan
Substitutions:
DF	19	Lee Addy		(substituted on) 73'
MF	10	Stephen Appiah		(substituted on) 78'
MF	11	Sulley Muntari		(substituted on) 113'
Manager:
(Serbia) Milovan Rajevac

Man of the Match:
André Ayew (Ghana)

Assistant referees:
Gábor Erős (Hungary)
Tibor Vámos (Hungary)
Fourth official:
Michael Hester (New Zealand)
Fifth official:
Tevita Makasini (Tonga)

==== Uruguay vs Ghana ====
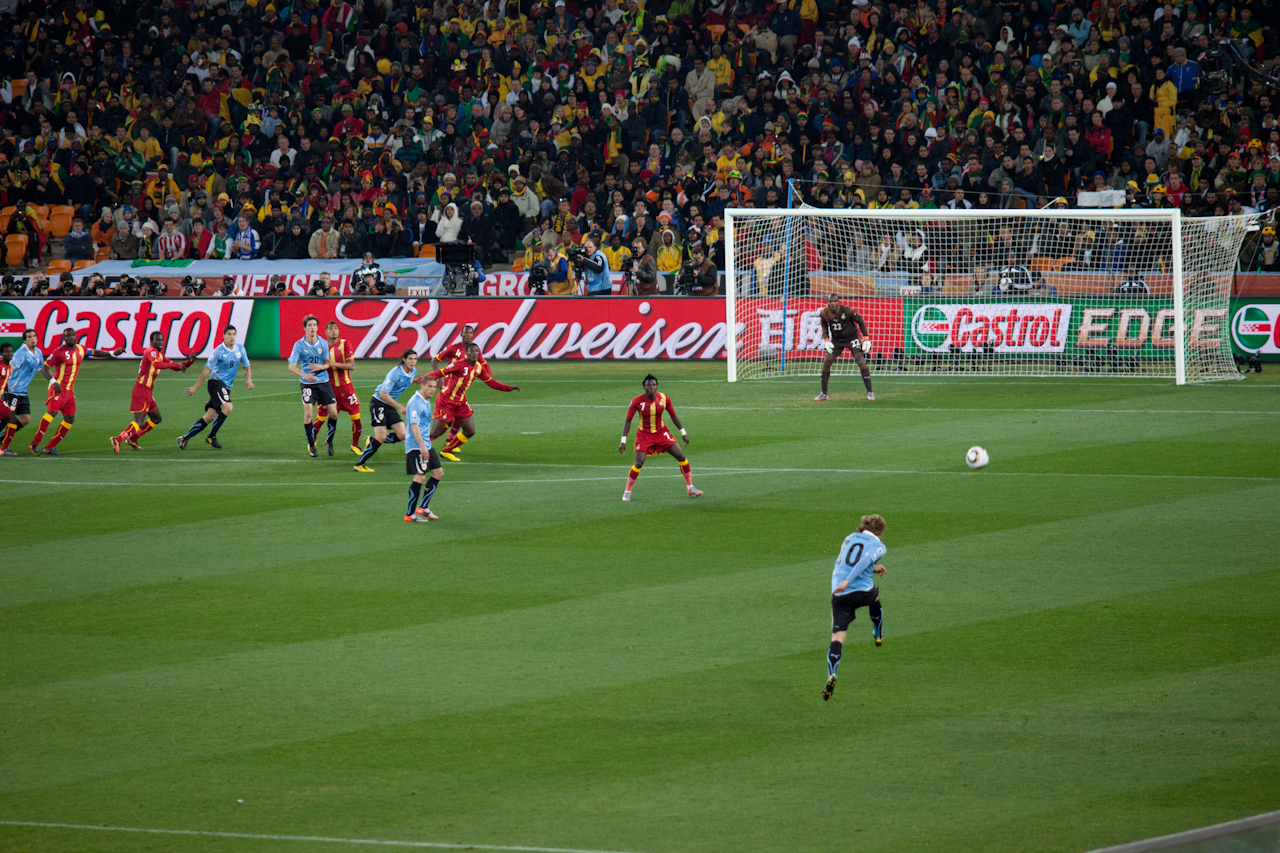
Ghana vs. Uruguay in the 2010 FIFA World Cup quarter-final match at Soccer City, Johannesburg on 2 July 2010.

Uruguay and Ghana met on 2 July 2010 at Soccer City, Johannesburg for a place in the semi-final against the Netherlands. It was the first time that the teams had ever played each other in a senior competitive football match. After a dramatic 120 minutes of play (including extra time) that finished 1–1, Uruguay won in a penalty shoot-out 4–2. Uruguay dominated the early periods of the match, but suffered an injury to captain Diego Lugano in the first half. Just before half-time, Ghana took the lead when Sulley Muntari was allowed time on the ball by Uruguay, and took advantage by scoring with a shot from 40 yards. After half-time, Diego Forlán pulled Uruguay level with a free kick from the left side of the field that went over the head of Ghana's goalkeeper Richard Kingson. While both teams had chances to win, the match proceeded to extra time as the scores remained level. Late in extra time, Ghana sent a free kick into the box; Luis Suárez blocked Stephen Appiah's shot on the goal line. On the rebound, Dominic Adiyiah's header was heading into the goal, but Suárez blatantly blocked the shot with his hands to save what would have been the extra-time winner and he was red carded. Asamoah Gyan missed the ensuing penalty kick off the crossbar and Suárez celebrated the miss. In the shoot-out, Gyan converted his penalty, as did everybody else until the 4th round of penalty kicks when Adiyiah's penalty was saved by Uruguayan goalkeeper Fernando Muslera. Uruguay's Maxi Pereira then hit his penalty kick over the bar. Muslera saved Captain John Mensah's, and Ghana's fifth, penalty. Sebastián Abreu converted Uruguay's fifth spot kick by lightly chipping it Panenka-style to win the match. After the game, Suárez said, "I made the save of the tournament," and, referring to the infamous handball goal scored by Diego Maradona in the 1986 World Cup, claimed that "The 'Hand of God' now belongs to me." Suárez claimed he had no alternative and was acting out of instinct. Forlán agreed that Suárez saved the game, "Suárez this time, instead of scoring goals, he saved one, I think he saved the game. Ghana coach Milovan Rajevac said the play was an "injustice" and Suárez was labeled a "villain" and a "cheat". But Uruguay coach, Óscar Tabárez, said these labels were too harsh, "Well, there was a handball in the penalty area, there was a red card and Suárez was thrown out. Saying that Ghana were cheated out of the game is too harsh. We have to go by the rules. It might have been a mistake by my player but I do not like that word ‘cheating’." Ghana was the last African team left in the tournament and if they had won, they would have been the first team from Africa to ever make the semi-finals. But others viewed him as a hero who sacrificed himself in the semi-final for the unlikely chance that his team could win. A distraught Gyan conceded, "I would say Suárez is a hero now in his own country, because the ball was going in and he held it with his hand. He is a hero now."

2 July 2010
20:30

Uruguay	1–1 (a.e.t.)	Ghana
Forlán 55'	Report	Muntari 45+2'
Penalties
Forlán (penalty scored); Victorino (penalty scored); Scotti (penalty scored); M. Pereira (penalty missed); Abreu (penalty scored)	4–2	(penalty scored) Gyan; (penalty scored) Appiah; (penalty missed) Mensah; (penalty missed) Adiyiah

Soccer City, Johannesburg
Attendance: 84,017
Referee: Olegário Benquerença (Portugal)

Uruguay	Ghana

GK	1	Fernando Muslera
RB	16	Maxi Pereira
CB	2	Diego Lugano (c)		(substituted off) 38'
CB	6	Mauricio Victorino
LB	4	Jorge Fucile	(yellow card) 20'
RM	20	Álvaro Fernández		(substituted off) 46'
CM	15	Diego Pérez	(yellow card) 59'
CM	17	Egidio Arévalo Ríos	(yellow card) 48'
LM	7	Edinson Cavani		(substituted off) 76'
CF	9	Luis Suárez	(red card) 120+1'
CF	10	Diego Forlán
Substitutions:
DF	19	Andrés Scotti		(substituted on) 38'
MF	14	Nicolás Lodeiro		(substituted on) 46'
FW	13	Sebastián Abreu		(substituted on) 76'
Manager:
Óscar Tabárez

GK	22	Richard Kingson
RB	4	John Paintsil	(yellow card) 54'
CB	15	Isaac Vorsah
CB	5	John Mensah (c)	(yellow card) 93'
LB	2	Hans Sarpei	(yellow card) 77'
DM	6	Anthony Annan
RM	7	Samuel Inkoom		(substituted off) 74'
CM	21	Kwadwo Asamoah
CM	23	Kevin-Prince Boateng
LM	11	Sulley Muntari		(substituted off) 88'
CF	3	Asamoah Gyan
Substitutions:
MF	10	Stephen Appiah		(substituted on) 74'
FW	18	Dominic Adiyiah		(substituted on) 88'
Manager:
(Serbia) Milovan Rajevac

Man of the Match:
Diego Forlán (Uruguay)

Assistant referees:
José Manuel Silva Cardinal (Portugal)
Bertino Miranda (Portugal)
Fourth official:
Alberto Undiano Mallenco (Spain)
Fifth official:
Fermín Martínez Ibánez (Spain)

=== Brazil 2014 ===
Head coach: (Ghana) James Kwesi Appiah

The final squad was announced on 1 June 2014. On 26 June 2014, midfielders Sulley Muntari and Kevin-Prince Boateng were sent home and indefinitely suspended from the national team for disciplinary reasons.

No.	Pos.	Player	Date of birth (age)	Caps	Club
1	GK	Stephen Adams	28 September 1989 (aged 24)	7	(Ghana) Aduana Stars
2	DF	Samuel Inkoom	1 June 1989 (aged 25)	46	(Greece) Platanias
3	FW	Asamoah Gyan (c)	22 November 1985 (aged 28)	79	(United Arab Emirates) Al-Ain
4	DF	Daniel Opare	18 October 1990 (aged 23)	16	(Belgium) Standard Liège
5	MF	Michael Essien	3 December 1982 (aged 31)	57	(Italy) Milan
6	MF	Afriyie Acquah	5 January 1992 (aged 22)	5	(Italy) Parma
7	MF	Christian Atsu	10 January 1992 (aged 22)	23	(Netherlands) Vitesse
8	MF	Emmanuel Agyemang-Badu	2 December 1990 (aged 23)	49	(Italy) Udinese
9	FW	Kevin-Prince Boateng	6 March 1987 (aged 27)	13	(Germany) Schalke 04
10	MF	André Ayew	17 December 1989 (aged 24)	49	(France) Marseille
11	MF	Sulley Muntari	27 August 1984 (aged 29)	82	(Italy) Milan
12	GK	Adam Kwarasey	12 December 1987 (aged 26)	21	(Norway) Strømsgodset
13	FW	Jordan Ayew	11 September 1991 (aged 22)	13	(France) Sochaux
14	MF	Albert Adomah	13 December 1987 (aged 26)	15	(England) Middlesbrough
15	DF	Rashid Sumaila	18 December 1992 (aged 21)	6	(South Africa) Mamelodi Sundowns
16	GK	Fatau Dauda	6 April 1985 (aged 29)	18	(South Africa) Orlando Pirates
17	MF	Mohammed Rabiu	31 December 1989 (aged 24)	17	(Russia) Kuban Krasnodar
18	FW	Majeed Waris	19 September 1991 (aged 22)	13	(France) Valenciennes
19	DF	Jonathan Mensah	13 July 1990 (aged 23)	27	(France) Evian
20	MF	Kwadwo Asamoah	9 December 1988 (aged 25)	62	(Italy) Juventus
21	DF	John Boye	23 April 1987 (aged 27)	30	(France) Rennes
22	MF	Mubarak Wakaso	25 July 1990 (aged 23)	17	(Russia) Rubin Kazan
23	DF	Harrison Afful	24 June 1986 (aged 27)	41	(Tunisia) Espérance

==== Ghana vs United States ====
16 June 2014
19:00

Ghana	1–2	United States
A. Ayew 82'		Dempsey 1'; Brooks 86'

Arena das Dunas, Natal
Attendance: 51,081
Referee: Jonas Eriksson (Sweden)

==== Germany vs Ghana ====
22 June 2014
16:00

Germany	2–2	Ghana
Götze 51'; Klose 71'		A. Ayew 54'; Gyan 63'

Estádio Castelão, Fortaleza
Attendance: 59,481
Referee: Sandro Ricci (Brazil)

==== Portugal vs Ghana ====
26 June 2014
13:00

Portugal	2–1	Ghana
Boye 31' (o.g.); Ronaldo 80'		Gyan 57'

Estádio Nacional Mané Garrincha, Brasília
Attendance: 67,540
Referee: Nawaf Shukralla (Bahrain)

=== Qatar 2022 ===
==== Group stage ====
Pos	Team	Pld	W	D	L	GF	GA	GD	Pts	Qualification
1	Portugal	3	2	0	1	6	4	+2	6	Advance to knockout stage
2	South Korea	3	1	1	1	4	4	0	4	Advance to knockout stage
3	Uruguay	3	1	1	1	2	2	0	4	
4	Ghana	3	1	0	2	5	7	−2	3	

Source: FIFA
Rules for classification: Group stage tiebreakers
24 November 2022
19:00

Portugal	3–2	Ghana
Ronaldo 65' (pen.); Félix 78'; Leão 80'		A. Ayew 73'; Bukari 89'

Stadium 974, Doha
Attendance: 42,662
Referee: Ismail Elfath (United States)

28 November 2022
16:00

South Korea	2–3	Ghana
Cho Gue-sung 58', 61'		Salisu 24'; Kudus 34', 68'

Education City Stadium, Al Rayyan
Attendance: 43,983
Referee: Anthony Taylor (England)

2 December 2022
18:00

Ghana	0–2	Uruguay
		De Arrascaeta 26', 32'

Al Janoub Stadium, Al Wakrah
Attendance: 43,443
Referee: Daniel Siebert (Germany)

=== United States/Canada/Mexico 2026 ===
==== Group stage ====
Pos	Team	Pld	W	D	L	GF	GA	GD	Pts	Qualification
1	England	3	2	1	0	6	2	+4	7	Advance to knockout stage
2	Croatia	3	2	0	1	5	5	0	6	Advance to knockout stage
3	Ghana	3	1	1	1	2	2	0	4	Advance to knockout stage
4	Panama	3	0	0	3	0	4	−4	0	

Source: FIFA
June 17, 2026
7:00 p.m. UTC−4

Ghana	1–0	Panama
Yirenkyi 90+5'	(Note: "Ghana vs Panama | First Stage | FIFA World Cup 2026". FIFA. Retrieved June 18, 2026.; "Match Report – Group L – Ghana v. Panama". FIFA. June 18, 2026. Retrieved June 18, 2026.; "Post match summary report – Group L – Ghana v. Panama". FIFA. June 18, 2026. Retrieved June 19, 2026.)

BMO Field, Toronto
Attendance: 42,942
Referee: Glenn Nyberg (Sweden)

June 23, 2026
4:00 p.m. UTC−4

England	0–0	Ghana
	(Note: "England vs Ghana | First Stage | FIFA World Cup 2026". FIFA. Retrieved June 23, 2026.; "Match Report – Group L – England v. Ghana". FIFA. June 23, 2026. Retrieved June 23, 2026.; "Post match summary report – Group L – England v. Ghana". FIFA. June 24, 2026. Retrieved June 25, 2026.)

Gillette Stadium, Foxborough
Attendance: 63,983
Referee: Saíd Martínez (Honduras)

June 27, 2026
5:00 p.m. UTC−4

Croatia	2–1	Ghana
P. Sučić 31'; Vlašić 83'	(Note: "Croatia vs Ghana | First Stage | FIFA World Cup 2026". FIFA. Retrieved June 27, 2026.; "Match Report – Group L – Croatia v. Ghana". FIFA. June 27, 2026. Retrieved June 27, 2026.; "Post match summary report – Group L – Croatia v. Ghana". FIFA. June 28, 2026. Retrieved June 28, 2026.)	Luckassen 73'

Lincoln Financial Field, Philadelphia
Attendance: 68,324
Referee: Drew Fischer (Canada)

==== Knockout stage ====
Round of 32

July 3, 2026
8:30 p.m. UTC−5

Colombia	1–0	Ghana
J. Arias 14'	(Note: "Colombia vs Ghana | Round of 32 | FIFA World Cup 2026". FIFA. July 4, 2026. Retrieved July 4, 2026.; "Match Report – Round of 32 – Colombia v. Ghana". FIFA. July 4, 2026. Retrieved July 4, 2026.; "Post match summary report – Round of 32 – Colombia v. Ghana". FIFA. July 3, 2026. Retrieved July 4, 2026.)

Arrowhead Stadium, Kansas City
Attendance: 69,045
Referee: Clément Turpin (France)

== Player records ==
=== Most appearances ===
Rank	Player	Matches	World Cups
1	Asamoah Gyan	11	2006, 2010 and 2014
2	André Ayew	10	2010, 2014 and 2022
2	Jordan Ayew	10	2014, 2022 and 2026
4	Richard Kingson	9	2006 and 2010
4	John Paintsil	9	2006 and 2010
4	Sulley Muntari	9	2006, 2010 and 2014
7	John Mensah	8	2006 and 2010
7	Kwadwo Asamoah	8	2010 and 2014
9	Stephen Appiah	7	2006 and 2010
9	Kevin-Prince Boateng	7	2010 and 2014

=== Goalscorers ===
On June 17th 2006, Asamoah Gyan made history by scoring Ghana's first-ever FIFA World Cup goal, doing so on their match against Czech Republic in Cologne.

Player	Goals	2006	2010	2014	2022	2026
Asamoah Gyan	6	1	3	2		
André Ayew	3			2	1	
Sulley Muntari	2	1	1			
Mohammed Kudus	2				2	
Stephen Appiah	1	1				
Haminu Draman	1	1				
Kevin-Prince Boateng	1		1			
Osman Bukari	1				1	
Mohammed Salisu	1				1	
Caleb Yirenkyi	1					1
Derrick Luckassen	1					1
Total	20	4	5	4	5	2

== See also ==
- African nations at the FIFA World Cup
- Ghana at the Africa Cup of Nations
