= 2006 FIFA World Cup Group E =

Football tournament group stage

Group E of the 2006 FIFA World Cup began on 12 June and completed on 22 June 2006. Eventual champions Italy won the group and advanced to the round of 16 along with second-placed Ghana. The Czech Republic and the United States failed to advance. Due to the calibre of the teams involved, this was one of two groups at the 2006 World Cup considered to be a group of death (along with Group C).

== Standings ==
Pos	Team	Pld	W	D	L	GF	GA	GD	Pts	Qualification
1	Italy	3	2	1	0	5	1	+4	7	Advance to knockout stage
2	Ghana	3	2	0	1	4	3	+1	6	Advance to knockout stage
3	Czech Republic	3	1	0	2	3	4	−1	3	
4	United States	3	0	1	2	2	6	−4	1	

Source: FIFA
Rules for classification: Tie-breaking criteria
- Italy advanced to play Australia (runners-up of Group F) in the round of 16.
- Ghana advanced to play Brazil (winners of Group F) in the round of 16.

== Matches ==
All times local (CEST/UTC+2)

=== United States vs Czech Republic ===
12 June 2006
18:00

United States	0–3	Czech Republic
		Koller 5'; Rosický 36', 76'

Arena AufSchalke, Gelsenkirchen
Attendance: 52,000
Referee: Carlos Amarilla (Paraguay)

United States	Czech Republic

GK	18	Kasey Keller
RB	6	Steve Cherundolo		(substituted off) 46'
CB	23	Eddie Pope
CB	22	Oguchi Onyewu	(yellow card) 5'
LB	7	Eddie Lewis
RM	17	DaMarcus Beasley
CM	10	Claudio Reyna (c)	(yellow card) 60'
CM	4	Pablo Mastroeni		(substituted off) 46'
LM	15	Bobby Convey
AM	21	Landon Donovan
CF	20	Brian McBride		(substituted off) 77'
Substitutions:
FW	9	Eddie Johnson		(substituted on) 46'
MF	5	John O'Brien		(substituted on) 46'
FW	16	Josh Wolff		(substituted on) 77'
Manager:
Bruce Arena

GK	1	Petr Čech
RB	2	Zdeněk Grygera	(yellow card) 88'
CB	21	Tomáš Ujfaluši
CB	22	David Rozehnal	(yellow card) 16'
LB	6	Marek Jankulovski
DM	4	Tomáš Galásek (c)
RM	8	Karel Poborský		(substituted off) 82'
CM	10	Tomáš Rosický	(yellow card) 81'	(substituted off) 86'
CM	11	Pavel Nedvěd
LM	20	Jaroslav Plašil
CF	9	Jan Koller		(substituted off) 45'
Substitutions:
FW	12	Vratislav Lokvenc	(yellow card) 59'	(substituted on) 45'
MF	19	Jan Polák		(substituted on) 82'
MF	17	Jiří Štajner		(substituted on) 86'
Manager:
Karel Brückner

Man of the Match:
Tomáš Rosický (Czech Republic)

Assistant referees:
Amelio Andino (Paraguay)
Bernal Manuel (Paraguay)
Fourth official:
Carlos Chandía (Chile)
Fifth official:
Rodrigo González (Chile)

=== Italy vs Ghana ===
12 June 2006
21:00

Italy	2–0	Ghana
Pirlo 40'; Iaquinta 83'

Niedersachsenstadion, Hanover
Attendance: 43,000
Referee: Carlos Simon (Brazil)

Italy	Ghana

GK	1	Gianluigi Buffon
RB	2	Cristian Zaccardo
CB	13	Alessandro Nesta
CB	5	Fabio Cannavaro (c)
LB	3	Fabio Grosso
RM	20	Simone Perrotta
CM	21	Andrea Pirlo
LM	4	Daniele De Rossi	(yellow card) 10'
AM	10	Francesco Totti		(substituted off) 56'
CF	11	Alberto Gilardino		(substituted off) 64'
CF	9	Luca Toni		(substituted off) 82'
Substitutions:
MF	16	Mauro Camoranesi	(yellow card) 62'	(substituted on) 56'
FW	15	Vincenzo Iaquinta	(yellow card) 88'	(substituted on) 64'
FW	7	Alessandro Del Piero		(substituted on) 82'
Manager:
Marcello Lippi

GK	22	Richard Kingson
RB	15	John Paintsil
CB	5	John Mensah
CB	4	Samuel Kuffour
LB	6	Emmanuel Pappoe		(substituted off) 46'
RM	10	Stephen Appiah (c)
CM	18	Eric Addo
CM	8	Michael Essien
LM	11	Sulley Muntari	(yellow card) 41'
CF	3	Asamoah Gyan	(yellow card) 65'	(substituted off) 89'
CF	14	Matthew Amoah		(substituted off) 68'
Substitutions:
DF	7	Illiasu Shilla		(substituted on) 46'
FW	19	Razak Pimpong		(substituted on) 68'
FW	12	Alex Tachie-Mensah		(substituted on) 89'
Manager:
(Serbia and Montenegro) Ratomir Dujković

Man of the Match:
Andrea Pirlo (Italy)

Assistant referees:
Aristeu Tavares (Brazil)
Ednílson Corona (Brazil)
Fourth official:
Khalil Al Ghamdi (Saudi Arabia)
Fifth official:
Hamdi Al Kadri (Syria)

=== Czech Republic vs Ghana ===
Tomáš Ujfaluši was sent off in the 65th minute after tripping Matthew Amoah in the penalty box from behind. Asamoah Gyan took the penalty kick but struck the post and then received a yellow card for taking the shot without the referee's permission.

17 June 2006
18:00

Czech Republic	0–2	Ghana
		Gyan 2'; Muntari 82'

RheinEnergieStadion, Cologne
Attendance: 45,000
Referee: Horacio Elizondo (Argentina)

Czech Republic	Ghana

GK	1	Petr Čech
RB	2	Zdeněk Grygera
CB	21	Tomáš Ujfaluši	(red card) 65'
CB	22	David Rozehnal
LB	6	Marek Jankulovski
DM	4	Tomáš Galásek (c)		(substituted off) 46'
RM	8	Karel Poborský		(substituted off) 56'
CM	10	Tomáš Rosický
CM	11	Pavel Nedvěd
LM	20	Jaroslav Plašil		(substituted off) 68'
CF	12	Vratislav Lokvenc	(yellow card) 49'
Substitutions:
MF	19	Jan Polák		(substituted on) 46'
MF	17	Jiří Štajner		(substituted on) 56'
FW	7	Libor Sionko		(substituted on) 68'
Manager:
Karel Brückner

GK	22	Richard Kingson
RB	15	John Paintsil
CB	5	John Mensah
CB	7	Illiasu Shilla
LB	13	Habib Mohamed	(yellow card) 90+3'
RM	20	Otto Addo	(yellow card) 18'	(substituted off) 46'
CM	8	Michael Essien	(yellow card) 37'
CM	10	Stephen Appiah (c)
LM	11	Sulley Muntari	(yellow card) 84'
CF	14	Matthew Amoah		(substituted off) 80'
CF	3	Asamoah Gyan	(yellow card) 66'	(substituted off) 85'
Substitutions:
MF	9	Derek Boateng	(yellow card) 75'	(substituted on) 46'
MF	18	Eric Addo		(substituted on) 80'
FW	19	Razak Pimpong		(substituted on) 85'
Manager:
(Serbia and Montenegro) Ratomir Dujković

Man of the Match:
Michael Essien (Ghana)

Assistant referees:
Darío García (Argentina)
Rodolfo Otero (Argentina)
Fourth official:
Jerome Damon (South Africa)
Fifth official:
Enock Molefe (South Africa)

=== Italy vs United States ===
Italy midfielder Daniele De Rossi was sent off in the 28th minute after elbowing U.S. striker Brian McBride in a rash challenge that left the American with blood all over his face and requiring three stitches under his left eye. FIFA banned De Rossi for four matches (allowing him to return in the final) and fined him 10,000 CHF (£4,500).

17 June 2006
21:00

Italy	1–1	United States
Gilardino 22'		Zaccardo 27' (o.g.)

Fritz-Walter-Stadion, Kaiserslautern
Attendance: 46,000
Referee: Jorge Larrionda (Uruguay)

Italy	United States

GK	1	Gianluigi Buffon
RB	2	Cristian Zaccardo		(substituted off) 54'
CB	13	Alessandro Nesta
CB	5	Fabio Cannavaro (c)
LB	19	Gianluca Zambrotta	(yellow card) 70'
RM	20	Simone Perrotta
CM	21	Andrea Pirlo
LM	4	Daniele De Rossi	(red card) 28'
AM	10	Francesco Totti	(yellow card) 5'	(substituted off) 35'
CF	9	Luca Toni		(substituted off) 61'
CF	11	Alberto Gilardino
Substitutions:
MF	8	Gennaro Gattuso		(substituted on) 35'
FW	7	Alessandro Del Piero		(substituted on) 54'
FW	15	Vincenzo Iaquinta		(substituted on) 61'
Manager:
Marcello Lippi

GK	18	Kasey Keller
RB	6	Steve Cherundolo
CB	23	Eddie Pope	(yellow card) 21' (yellow-red card) 47'
CB	22	Oguchi Onyewu
LB	3	Carlos Bocanegra
RM	8	Clint Dempsey		(substituted off) 62'
CM	10	Claudio Reyna (c)
CM	4	Pablo Mastroeni	(red card) 45'
LM	15	Bobby Convey		(substituted off) 52'
CF	21	Landon Donovan
CF	20	Brian McBride
Substitutions:
DF	13	Jimmy Conrad		(substituted on) 52'
MF	17	DaMarcus Beasley		(substituted on) 62'
Manager:
Bruce Arena

Man of the Match:
Kasey Keller (United States)

Assistant referees:
Wálter Rial (Uruguay)
Pablo Fandino (Uruguay)
Fourth official:
Khalil Al Ghamdi (Saudi Arabia)
Fifth official:
Hamdi Al Kadri (Syria)

=== Czech Republic vs Italy ===
22 June 2006
16:00

Czech Republic	0–2	Italy
		Materazzi 26'; Inzaghi 87'

Volksparkstadion, Hamburg
Attendance: 50,000
Referee: Benito Archundia (Mexico)

Czech Republic	Italy

GK	1	Petr Čech
RB	2	Zdeněk Grygera
CB	5	Radoslav Kováč		(substituted off) 78'
CB	22	David Rozehnal
LB	6	Marek Jankulovski
DM	19	Jan Polák	(yellow card) 35' (yellow-red card) 45+2'
RM	8	Karel Poborský		(substituted off) 46'
CM	10	Tomáš Rosický
CM	11	Pavel Nedvěd (c)
LM	20	Jaroslav Plašil
CF	15	Milan Baroš		(substituted off) 64'
Substitutions:
MF	17	Jiří Štajner		(substituted on) 46'
MF	14	David Jarolím		(substituted on) 64'
FW	18	Marek Heinz		(substituted on) 78'
Manager:
Karel Brückner

GK	1	Gianluigi Buffon
RB	19	Gianluca Zambrotta
CB	13	Alessandro Nesta		(substituted off) 17'
CB	5	Fabio Cannavaro (c)
LB	3	Fabio Grosso
RM	8	Gennaro Gattuso	(yellow card) 31'
CM	21	Andrea Pirlo
LM	20	Simone Perrotta
AM	16	Mauro Camoranesi		(substituted off) 74'
AM	10	Francesco Totti
CF	11	Alberto Gilardino		(substituted off) 60'
Substitutions:
DF	23	Marco Materazzi		(substituted on) 17'
FW	18	Filippo Inzaghi		(substituted on) 60'
MF	17	Simone Barone		(substituted on) 74'
Manager:
Marcello Lippi

Man of the Match:
Marco Materazzi (Italy)

Assistant referees:
José Ramírez (Mexico)
Héctor Vergara (Canada)
Fourth official:
Óscar Ruiz (Colombia)
Fifth official:
José Navia (Colombia)

=== Ghana vs United States ===
22 June 2006
16:00

Ghana	2–1	United States
Draman 22'; Appiah 45+2' (pen.)		Dempsey 43'

Frankenstadion, Nuremberg
Attendance: 41,000
Referee: Markus Merk (Germany)

Ghana	United States

GK	22	Richard Kingson
RB	15	John Paintsil
CB	5	John Mensah	(yellow card) 81'
CB	7	Illiasu Shilla	(yellow card) 32'
LB	13	Habib Mohamed
RM	9	Derek Boateng		(substituted off) 46'
CM	10	Stephen Appiah (c)	(yellow card) 90+1'
CM	8	Michael Essien	(yellow card) 5'
LM	23	Haminu Draman		(substituted off) 80'
CF	14	Matthew Amoah		(substituted off) 59'
CF	19	Razak Pimpong
Substitutions:
MF	20	Otto Addo		(substituted on) 46'
MF	18	Eric Addo		(substituted on) 59'
FW	12	Alex Tachie-Mensah		(substituted on) 80'
Manager:
(Serbia and Montenegro) Ratomir Dujković

GK	18	Kasey Keller
RB	6	Steve Cherundolo		(substituted off) 61'
CB	22	Oguchi Onyewu
CB	13	Jimmy Conrad
LB	3	Carlos Bocanegra
RM	8	Clint Dempsey
CM	21	Landon Donovan
CM	10	Claudio Reyna (c)		(substituted off) 40'
CM	17	DaMarcus Beasley
LM	7	Eddie Lewis	(yellow card) 7'	(substituted off) 74'
CF	20	Brian McBride
Substitutions:
MF	14	Ben Olsen		(substituted on) 40'
FW	9	Eddie Johnson		(substituted on) 61'
MF	15	Bobby Convey		(substituted on) 74'
Manager:
Bruce Arena

Man of the Match:
Stephen Appiah (Ghana)

Assistant referees:
Christian Schräer (Germany)
Jan-Hendrik Salver (Germany)
Fourth official:
Toru Kamikawa (Japan)
Fifth official:
Yoshikazu Hiroshima (Japan)

== See also ==
- Czech Republic at the FIFA World Cup
- Ghana at the FIFA World Cup
- Italy at the FIFA World Cup
- United States at the FIFA World Cup
