= 2014 FIFA World Cup Group G =

Football World Cup

Group G of the 2014 FIFA World Cup consisted of eventual champions Germany, Portugal, Ghana and United States. Play began on 16 June and ended on 26 June 2014. The top two teams, Germany and the United States, advanced to the round of 16.

== Teams ==
Draw position	Team	Confederation	Method of qualification	Date of qualification	Finals appearance	Last appearance	Previous best performance	FIFA Rankings	
Draw position	Team	Confederation	Method of qualification	Date of qualification	Finals appearance	Last appearance	Previous best performance	October 2013 (Note: The rankings of October 2013 were used for seeding for the final draw.)	June 2014
G1 (seed)	Germany	UEFA	UEFA Group C winners	11 October 2013	18th	2010	Winners (1954, 1974, 1990)	2	2
G2	Portugal	UEFA	UEFA play-off winners	19 November 2013	6th	2010	Third place (1966)	14	4
G3	Ghana	CAF	CAF third round winners	19 November 2013	3rd	2010	Quarter-finals (2010)	23	37
G4	United States	CONCACAF	CONCACAF fourth round winners	10 September 2013	10th	2010	Third place (1930)	13	13

== Standings ==
Pos	Team	Pld	W	D	L	GF	GA	GD	Pts	Qualification
1	Germany	3	2	1	0	7	2	+5	7	Advance to knockout stage
2	United States	3	1	1	1	4	4	0	4	Advance to knockout stage
3	Portugal	3	1	1	1	4	7	−3	4	
4	Ghana	3	0	1	2	4	6	−2	1	

Source: FIFA
Rules for classification: Tie-breaking criteria
- Germany advanced to play Algeria (runner-up of Group H) in the round of 16.
- United States advanced to play Belgium (winner of Group H) in the round of 16.

== Matches ==
=== Germany vs Portugal ===
The two teams had met in 17 previous matches, including in the 2006 FIFA World Cup match for third place, won by Germany 3–1. Their most recent meeting was in the UEFA Euro 2012 group stage, won by Germany 1–0.

Germany took the lead with a Thomas Müller penalty kick, shooting low and hard into the bottom left-hand corner, awarded after a foul on Mario Götze by João Pereira. Mats Hummels doubled the advantage for Germany by heading in a corner kick from Toni Kroos. Shortly before halftime Müller and Pepe were involved in an altercation, in which Pepe headbutted Müller and was sent off. In first half stoppage time, Müller intercepted a clearance from Bruno Alves to slot home. Müller completed his hat-trick in the second half, as he scored from close range after Portugal goalkeeper Rui Patrício stopped André Schürrle's cross from the right.

The match was Germany's 100th in the World Cup, the first team to reach the milestone. Müller's hat-trick was the seventh by a German player in the World Cup, the most of any nation. This was Portugal's worst loss in their World Cup history.

16 June 2014
13:00 BRT (UTC−3)

Germany	4–0	Portugal
Müller 12' (pen.), 45+1', 78'; Hummels 32'

Itaipava Arena Fonte Nova, Salvador
Attendance: 51,081
Referee: Milorad Mažić (Serbia)

Germany	Portugal

GK	1	Manuel Neuer
RB	20	Jérôme Boateng
CB	17	Per Mertesacker
CB	5	Mats Hummels	(substituted off) 73'
LB	4	Benedikt Höwedes
DM	16	Philipp Lahm (c)
CM	6	Sami Khedira
CM	18	Toni Kroos
RW	13	Thomas Müller	(substituted off) 82'
LW	19	Mario Götze
CF	8	Mesut Özil	(substituted off) 63'
Substitutions:
MF	9	André Schürrle	(substituted on) 63'
DF	21	Shkodran Mustafi	(substituted on) 73'
FW	10	Lukas Podolski	(substituted on) 82'
Manager:
Joachim Löw

GK	12	Rui Patrício
RB	21	João Pereira	(yellow card) 11'
CB	2	Bruno Alves
CB	3	Pepe	(red card) 37'
LB	5	Fábio Coentrão		(substituted off) 65'
DM	4	Miguel Veloso		(substituted off) 46'
CM	8	João Moutinho
CM	16	Raul Meireles
RW	17	Nani
LW	7	Cristiano Ronaldo (c)
CF	9	Hugo Almeida		(substituted off) 28'
Substitutions:
FW	11	Eder		(substituted on) 28'
DF	13	Ricardo Costa		(substituted on) 46'
DF	19	André Almeida		(substituted on) 65'
Manager:
Paulo Bento

Man of the Match:
Thomas Müller (Germany)

Assistant referees:
Milovan Ristić (Serbia)
Dalibor Đurđević (Serbia)
Fourth official:
Néant Alioum (Cameroon)
Fifth official:
Djibril Camara (Senegal)

=== Ghana vs United States ===
The two teams had met in three previous matches, including twice in World Cup in 2006 and 2010, where both times Ghana beat United States 2–1. The 2006 FIFA World Cup encounter was in their last group stage match, and the 2010 FIFA World Cup encounter was in the round of 16 final where Ghana won again, which in both occasions, eliminated United States from those previous World Cups.

Clint Dempsey opened the scoring for the United States within 29 seconds (the fifth fastest goal in the history of the World Cup), as he received the ball from Jermaine Jones, dribbled past John Boye and shot into the far corner. The lead lasted until the 82nd minute, when Asamoah Gyan's back-heel set up André Ayew to score. However, the United States scored the game-winning goal four minutes later, when half-time substitute John Brooks headed in Graham Zusi's corner. The American victory was marred by an injury to Jozy Altidore, leaving the match in the 21st minute with a strained left hamstring.

Dempsey's goal was officially timed by FIFA at 30 seconds after kick-off, the fifth fastest in World Cup history, and the fastest by an American player. He also became the first American player to score in three World Cups. DaMarcus Beasley became the first American to play in four World Cups. Brooks became the first American substitute ever to score in a World Cup.

16 June 2014
19:00 BRT (UTC−3)

Ghana	1–2	United States
A. Ayew 82'		Dempsey 1'; Brooks 86'

Arena das Dunas, Natal
Attendance: 39,760
Referee: Jonas Eriksson (Sweden)

Ghana	United States

GK	12	Adam Kwarasey
RB	4	Daniel Opare
CB	19	Jonathan Mensah
CB	21	John Boye
LB	20	Kwadwo Asamoah
CM	17	Mohammed Rabiu	(yellow card) 30'	(substituted off) 71'
CM	11	Sulley Muntari	(yellow card) 90+2'
AM	10	André Ayew
RF	13	Jordan Ayew		(substituted off) 59'
CF	3	Asamoah Gyan (c)
LF	7	Christian Atsu		(substituted off) 78'
Substitutions:
FW	9	Kevin-Prince Boateng		(substituted on) 59'
MF	5	Michael Essien		(substituted on) 71'
MF	14	Albert Adomah		(substituted on) 78'
Manager:
James Kwesi Appiah

GK	1	Tim Howard
RB	23	Fabian Johnson
CB	20	Geoff Cameron
CB	5	Matt Besler	(substituted off) 46'
LB	7	DaMarcus Beasley
DM	15	Kyle Beckerman
CM	11	Alejandro Bedoya	(substituted off) 77'
CM	13	Jermaine Jones
AM	4	Michael Bradley
CF	17	Jozy Altidore	(substituted off) 23'
CF	8	Clint Dempsey (c)
Substitutions:
FW	9	Aron Jóhannsson	(substituted on) 23'
DF	6	John Brooks	(substituted on) 46'
MF	19	Graham Zusi	(substituted on) 77'
Manager:
(Germany) Jürgen Klinsmann

Man of the Match:
Clint Dempsey (United States)

Assistant referees:
Mathias Klasenius (Sweden)
Daniel Wärnmark (Sweden)
Fourth official:
Norbert Hauata (Tahiti)
Fifth official:
Aden Marwa (Kenya)

=== Germany vs Ghana ===
The two teams had met in three previous matches, including in the 2010 FIFA World Cup group stage, won by Germany 1–0. This fixture is the 800th World Cup match.

After a goalless first half, Germany took the lead when Thomas Müller crossed from the right for Mario Götze, whose header went in off his thigh. Ghana equalised three minutes later, when André Ayew headed in Harrison Afful's cross from the right. Ghana then took the lead when Sulley Muntari intercepted the ball from Philipp Lahm, then slipped a through ball for Asamoah Gyan to score with his right foot. Just two minutes after coming on as a substitute, Miroslav Klose once again tied up the match, with a close-range finish after Benedikt Höwedes flicked on a corner from Toni Kroos.

Klose's goal took his World Cup total to 15, equalling the record mark held by Brazil's Ronaldo. He also joined Pelé and Uwe Seeler as the only players to have scored in four World Cups. Gyan became the joint top African scorer in the World Cup (tied with Cameroon's Roger Milla) with five goals, and also the first African player to score in three World Cups. Just as in the 2010 meeting, Jérôme Boateng (Germany) and Kevin-Prince Boateng (Ghana) faced each other, the second time two brothers faced each other in a World Cup game.

In the 52nd minute, a man with a Polish passport, identified as Leszek Ludomir, invaded the pitch shirtless, with neo-Nazi letters and numbers painted on his chest and back. FIFA's official TV feed cut out the images. The man was approached in a calm and friendly manner by Ghana midfielder Sulley Muntari, who quickly escorted him off the pitch, and he was then taken into custody by the stadium security. It was also quite surprising that no police were seen on the pitch in pursuit of the invader.

21 June 2014
16:00 BRT (UTC−3)

Germany	2–2	Ghana
Götze 51'; Klose 71'		A. Ayew 54'; Gyan 63'

Estádio Castelão, Fortaleza
Attendance: 59,621
Referee: Sandro Ricci (Brazil)

Germany	Ghana

GK	1	Manuel Neuer
RB	20	Jérôme Boateng	(substituted off) 46'
CB	17	Per Mertesacker
CB	5	Mats Hummels
LB	4	Benedikt Höwedes
DM	16	Philipp Lahm (c)
CM	6	Sami Khedira	(substituted off) 70'
CM	18	Toni Kroos
RW	8	Mesut Özil
LW	19	Mario Götze	(substituted off) 69'
CF	13	Thomas Müller
Substitutions:
DF	21	Shkodran Mustafi	(substituted on) 46'
FW	11	Miroslav Klose	(substituted on) 69'
MF	7	Bastian Schweinsteiger	(substituted on) 70'
Manager:
Joachim Löw

GK	16	Fatau Dauda
RB	23	Harrison Afful
CB	21	John Boye
CB	19	Jonathan Mensah
LB	20	Kwadwo Asamoah
CM	11	Sulley Muntari	(yellow card) 90+4'
CM	17	Mohammed Rabiu		(substituted off) 78'
RW	7	Christian Atsu		(substituted off) 72'
AM	9	Kevin-Prince Boateng		(substituted off) 52'
LW	10	André Ayew
CF	3	Asamoah Gyan (c)
Substitutions:
FW	13	Jordan Ayew		(substituted on) 52'
MF	22	Mubarak Wakaso		(substituted on) 72'
MF	8	Emmanuel Agyemang-Badu		(substituted on) 78'
Manager:
James Kwesi Appiah

Man of the Match:
Mario Götze (Germany)

Assistant referees:
Emerson De Carvalho (Brazil)
Marcelo Van Gasse (Brazil)
Fourth official:
Víctor Hugo Carrillo (Peru)
Fifth official:
Rodney Aquino (Paraguay)

=== United States vs Portugal ===
The two teams had met in five previous matches, including in the 2002 FIFA World Cup group stage, won by the United States 3–2. Portugal defender Pepe was suspended for the match after his red card against Germany.

Portugal took the lead within five minutes, when Geoff Cameron's mis-hit clearance fell to Nani and he scored from close range. Near the end of the first half, Nani's long-range shot hit the post, and American goalkeeper Tim Howard saved Éder's follow-up. In the second half, Michael Bradley had a shot cleared off the line by Ricardo Costa, but the United States eventually equalised through Jermaine Jones, as he curled in a right-foot shot in after a corner was cleared to him. The United States then took the lead, as Graham Zusi crossed for Clint Dempsey to score with his midriff. Had the United States held on for the win, they would have clinched a place in the knockout stage while eliminating Portugal at the same time, but in the fifth minute of injury time, Cristiano Ronaldo crossed for substitute Silvestre Varela to head in the equaliser and keep Portugal's qualification hopes alive.

Varela's goal (94:33) was the latest World Cup goal scored in regulation time. In the 39th minute, the players took a short water break during an injury stoppage, but this was not considered an official "cooling break" as introduced by FIFA for all matches during the 2026 World Cup.

22 June 2014
18:00 AMT (UTC−4)

United States	2–2	Portugal
Jones 64'; Dempsey 81'		Nani 5'; Varela 90+5'

Arena da Amazônia, Manaus
Attendance: 40,123
Referee: Néstor Pitana (Argentina)

United States	Portugal

GK	1	Tim Howard
RB	23	Fabian Johnson
CB	20	Geoff Cameron
CB	5	Matt Besler
LB	7	DaMarcus Beasley
CM	15	Kyle Beckerman
CM	13	Jermaine Jones	(yellow card) 75'
RW	11	Alejandro Bedoya		(substituted off) 72'
AM	4	Michael Bradley
LW	19	Graham Zusi		(substituted off) 90+1'
CF	8	Clint Dempsey (c)		(substituted off) 87'
Substitutions:
DF	2	DeAndre Yedlin		(substituted on) 72'
FW	18	Chris Wondolowski		(substituted on) 87'
DF	3	Omar Gonzalez		(substituted on) 90+1'
Manager:
(Germany) Jürgen Klinsmann

GK	22	Beto
RB	21	João Pereira
CB	13	Ricardo Costa
CB	2	Bruno Alves
LB	19	André Almeida	(substituted off) 46'
DM	4	Miguel Veloso
CM	8	João Moutinho
CM	16	Raul Meireles	(substituted off) 69'
RW	17	Nani
LW	7	Cristiano Ronaldo (c)
CF	23	Hélder Postiga	(substituted off) 16'
Substitutions:
FW	11	Eder	(substituted on) 16'
MF	6	William Carvalho	(substituted on) 46'
MF	18	Silvestre Varela	(substituted on) 69'
Manager:
Paulo Bento

Man of the Match:
Tim Howard (United States)

Assistant referees:
Hernán Maidana (Argentina)
Juan Pablo Belatti (Argentina)
Fourth official:
Wálter López (Guatemala)
Fifth official:
Leonel Leal (Costa Rica)

=== United States vs Germany ===
The two teams had met in nine previous matches, including twice in the FIFA World Cup, both won by Germany (1998, group stage: 2–0; 2002, quarter-finals: 1–0). The match featured two German coaches, Jürgen Klinsmann and Joachim Löw, facing each other. United States coach Klinsmann played in three World Cups for Germany (he scored the second goal in the 1998 match against the United States), and also managed them in 2006 with Löw as his assistant, who succeeded him after the World Cup.

Both teams came into this match needing only one point to qualify for the knockout stage. The only goal of the match was scored by Thomas Müller in the 55th minute, who slotted in the rebound with his right foot from the edge of the penalty area after American goalkeeper Tim Howard parried out Per Mertesacker's header. With the win, Germany qualified as group winners, while the United States also qualified despite the loss as Portugal's 2–1 win over Ghana at the same time ensured that the Americans finished as group runners-up above the Portuguese on goal difference, meaning that they reached the knockout stage of consecutive World Cups for the first time. This was the first match of the tournament where Bastian Schweinsteiger was included in the starting lineup and the last match where Lukas Podolski saw any time on the pitch.

With Costa Rica and Mexico also reaching the knockout stage earlier, this was the first time there were three CONCACAF teams in the knockout stage of a World Cup.

26 June 2014
13:00 BRT (UTC−3)

United States	0–1	Germany
		Müller 55'

Itaipava Arena Pernambuco, Recife
Attendance: 41,876
Referee: Ravshan Irmatov (Uzbekistan)

United States	Germany

GK	1	Tim Howard
RB	23	Fabian Johnson
CB	3	Omar Gonzalez	(yellow card) 37'
CB	5	Matt Besler
LB	7	DaMarcus Beasley
CM	15	Kyle Beckerman	(yellow card) 62'
CM	13	Jermaine Jones
RW	19	Graham Zusi		(substituted off) 84'
AM	4	Michael Bradley
LW	14	Brad Davis		(substituted off) 59'
CF	8	Clint Dempsey (c)
Substitutions:
MF	11	Alejandro Bedoya		(substituted on) 59'
DF	2	DeAndre Yedlin		(substituted on) 84'
Manager:
(Germany) Jürgen Klinsmann

GK	1	Manuel Neuer
RB	20	Jérôme Boateng
CB	17	Per Mertesacker
CB	5	Mats Hummels
LB	4	Benedikt Höwedes	(yellow card) 11'
DM	16	Philipp Lahm (c)
CM	7	Bastian Schweinsteiger		(substituted off) 76'
CM	18	Toni Kroos
RW	8	Mesut Özil		(substituted off) 89'
LW	10	Lukas Podolski		(substituted off) 46'
CF	13	Thomas Müller
Substitutions:
FW	11	Miroslav Klose		(substituted on) 46'
MF	19	Mario Götze		(substituted on) 76'
MF	9	André Schürrle		(substituted on) 89'
Manager:
Joachim Löw

Man of the Match:
Thomas Müller (Germany)

Assistant referees:
Abdukhamidullo Rasulov (Uzbekistan)
Bakhadyr Kochkarov (Kyrgyzstan)
Fourth official:
Néant Alioum (Cameroon)
Fifth official:
Djibril Camara (Senegal)

=== Portugal vs Ghana ===
The two teams had never met before. Ghana midfielder Sulley Muntari was suspended for the match due to accumulation of yellow cards. However, along with fellow midfielder Kevin-Prince Boateng, Muntari was indefinitely suspended from the team for disciplinary reasons by the Ghana Football Association before the match.

Both teams came into the match knowing that to have any chance of qualifying for the knockout stage, they had to win while hoping that the United States vs Germany match, played at the same time, did not end in a draw. Portugal took the lead in the first half, when John Boye deflected in Miguel Veloso's cross with his knee for an own goal. Asamoah Gyan equalised for Ghana in the second half, heading in Kwadwo Asamoah's outside of the foot cross from the left. It was Gyan's sixth goal in World Cups, passing the tally of Roger Milla as the top African goalscorer in the competition. Cristiano Ronaldo scored the winner for Portugal in the 80th minute, after Ghana goalkeeper Fatau Dauda palmed the ball to him in the penalty area after a cross from the left, making Ronaldo the first Portuguese player to score in three World Cups.

Despite the win and Germany's win over the United States, Portugal finished behind the United States on goal difference, and were eliminated together with Ghana, who failed to reach the knockout stage for the first time in their three campaigns.

26 June 2014
13:00 BRT (UTC−3)

Portugal	2–1	Ghana
Boye 31' (o.g.); Ronaldo 80'		Gyan 57'

Estádio Nacional Mané Garrincha, Brasília
Attendance: 67,540
Referee: Nawaf Shukralla (Bahrain)

Portugal	Ghana

GK	22	Beto		(substituted off) 89'
RB	21	João Pereira		(substituted off) 61'
CB	3	Pepe
CB	2	Bruno Alves
LB	4	Miguel Veloso
DM	6	William Carvalho
CM	8	João Moutinho	(yellow card) 90+4'
CM	20	Ruben Amorim
RW	17	Nani
LW	7	Cristiano Ronaldo (c)
CF	11	Eder		(substituted off) 69'
Substitutions:
MF	18	Silvestre Varela		(substituted on) 61'
MF	10	Vieirinha		(substituted on) 69'
GK	1	Eduardo		(substituted on) 89'
Manager:
Paulo Bento

GK	16	Fatau Dauda
RB	23	Harrison Afful	(yellow card) 39'
CB	21	John Boye
CB	19	Jonathan Mensah
LB	20	Kwadwo Asamoah
CM	17	Mohammed Rabiu		(substituted off) 76'
CM	8	Emmanuel Agyemang-Badu
RW	7	Christian Atsu
LW	10	André Ayew		(substituted off) 81'
CF	18	Abdul Majeed Waris	(yellow card) 55'	(substituted off) 71'
CF	3	Asamoah Gyan (c)
Substitutions:
FW	13	Jordan Ayew	(yellow card) 78'	(substituted on) 71'
MF	6	Afriyie Acquah		(substituted on) 76'
MF	22	Mubarak Wakaso		(substituted on) 81'
Manager:
James Kwesi Appiah

Man of the Match:
Cristiano Ronaldo (Portugal)

Assistant referees:
Yaser Tulerat (Bahrain)
Ebrahim Saleh (Bahrain)
Fourth official:
Wilmar Roldán (Colombia)
Fifth official:
Eduardo Díaz (Colombia)

== See also ==
- Germany at the FIFA World Cup
- Ghana at the FIFA World Cup
- Portugal at the FIFA World Cup
- United States at the FIFA World Cup
