= 2010 FIFA World Cup Group D =

Football tournament group stage

Group D of the 2010 FIFA World Cup began on 13 June and ended on 23 June 2010. The group consisted of Germany, Australia, Serbia and Ghana. Along with Group G, it was considered to be a group of death.

== Standings ==
| Pos | Team | Pld | W | D | L | GF | GA | GD | Pts | Qualification |
|---|---|---|---|---|---|---|---|---|---|---|
| 1 | Germany | 3 | 2 | 0 | 1 | 5 | 1 | +4 | 6 | Advance to knockout stage |
| 2 | Ghana | 3 | 1 | 1 | 1 | 2 | 2 | 0 | 4 | Advance to knockout stage |
| 3 | Australia | 3 | 1 | 1 | 1 | 3 | 6 | −3 | 4 | |
| 4 | Serbia | 3 | 1 | 0 | 2 | 2 | 3 | −1 | 3 | |

Source: FIFA
Rules for classification: Tie-breaking criteria
- Germany advanced to play England (runners-up of Group C) in the round of 16.
- Ghana advanced to play United States (winners of Group C) in the round of 16.

== Matches ==
All times local (UTC+2)

=== Serbia vs Ghana ===
Ghana headed into their opening fixture against Serbia as the youngest team in the tournament. Serbia were touted as a potential dark horse for the tournament, and were looking to improve on their previous 2006 appearance at the World Cup as Serbia & Montenegro, where they lost all three of their group games and had the worst goal difference of minus 8 in that tournament.

In the opening half, Kwadwo Asamoah came closest to opening the scoring for Ghana on 15 minutes but Nikola Žigić to deflected the shot to go wide. Serbia created little from open play, but their main threat seemed to be from set pieces. After half-time, Asamoah Gyan's headed the ball towards the Serbia goal from close-range, but it struck the post.

Serbia were reduced to 10 men when Aleksandar Luković was sent off for holding back Gyan on the half-way line, which was his second bookable offence.

Late in the second half, Serbia substitute Zdravko Kuzmanović handballed in the box whilst attempting to clear a cross. Gyan converted the resultant penalty kick, giving Ghana a 1–0 lead. Deep into stoppage time, Gyan almost had a second goal, but his strike hit the post of the Serbia goal.

The victory for Ghana was the first in four games for African countries at the tournament, since South Africa drew with Mexico and Algeria and Nigeria both lost their opening games.

13 June 2010
16:00

| Serbia | 0–1 | Ghana |
|---|---|---|
| | | Gyan 85' (pen.) |

Loftus Versfeld Stadium, Pretoria
Attendance: 38,833
Referee: Héctor Baldassi (Argentina)

| Serbia | Ghana |

| GK | 1 | Vladimir Stojković |
| RB | 6 | Branislav Ivanović |
| CB | 13 | Aleksandar Luković | (yellow card) 54' (yellow-red card) 74' |
| CB | 5 | Nemanja Vidić |
| LB | 3 | Aleksandar Kolarov |
| CM | 11 | Nenad Milijaš | | (substituted off) 62' |
| CM | 10 | Dejan Stanković (c) |
| RW | 17 | Miloš Krasić |
| LW | 14 | Milan Jovanović | | (substituted off) 76' |
| CF | 9 | Marko Pantelić |
| CF | 15 | Nikola Žigić | (yellow card) 19' | (substituted off) 69' |
Substitutions:
| MF | 22 | Zdravko Kuzmanović | (yellow card) 83' | (substituted on) 62' |
| FW | 8 | Danko Lazović | | (substituted on) 69' |
| DF | 20 | Neven Subotić | | (substituted on) 76' |
Manager:
Radomir Antić

| GK | 22 | Richard Kingson |
| RB | 4 | John Paintsil |
| CB | 15 | Isaac Vorsah | (yellow card) 26' |
| CB | 5 | John Mensah (c) |
| LB | 2 | Hans Sarpei |
| CM | 6 | Anthony Annan |
| CM | 23 | Kevin-Prince Boateng | | (substituted off) 90+1' |
| RW | 12 | Prince Tagoe | (yellow card) 89' |
| AM | 21 | Kwadwo Asamoah | | (substituted off) 73' |
| LW | 13 | André Ayew |
| CF | 3 | Asamoah Gyan | | (substituted off) 90+3' |
Substitutions:
| MF | 10 | Stephen Appiah | | (substituted on) 73' |
| DF | 19 | Lee Addy | | (substituted on) 90+1' |
| MF | 20 | Quincy Owusu-Abeyie | | (substituted on) 90+3' |
Manager:
(Serbia) Milovan Rajevac

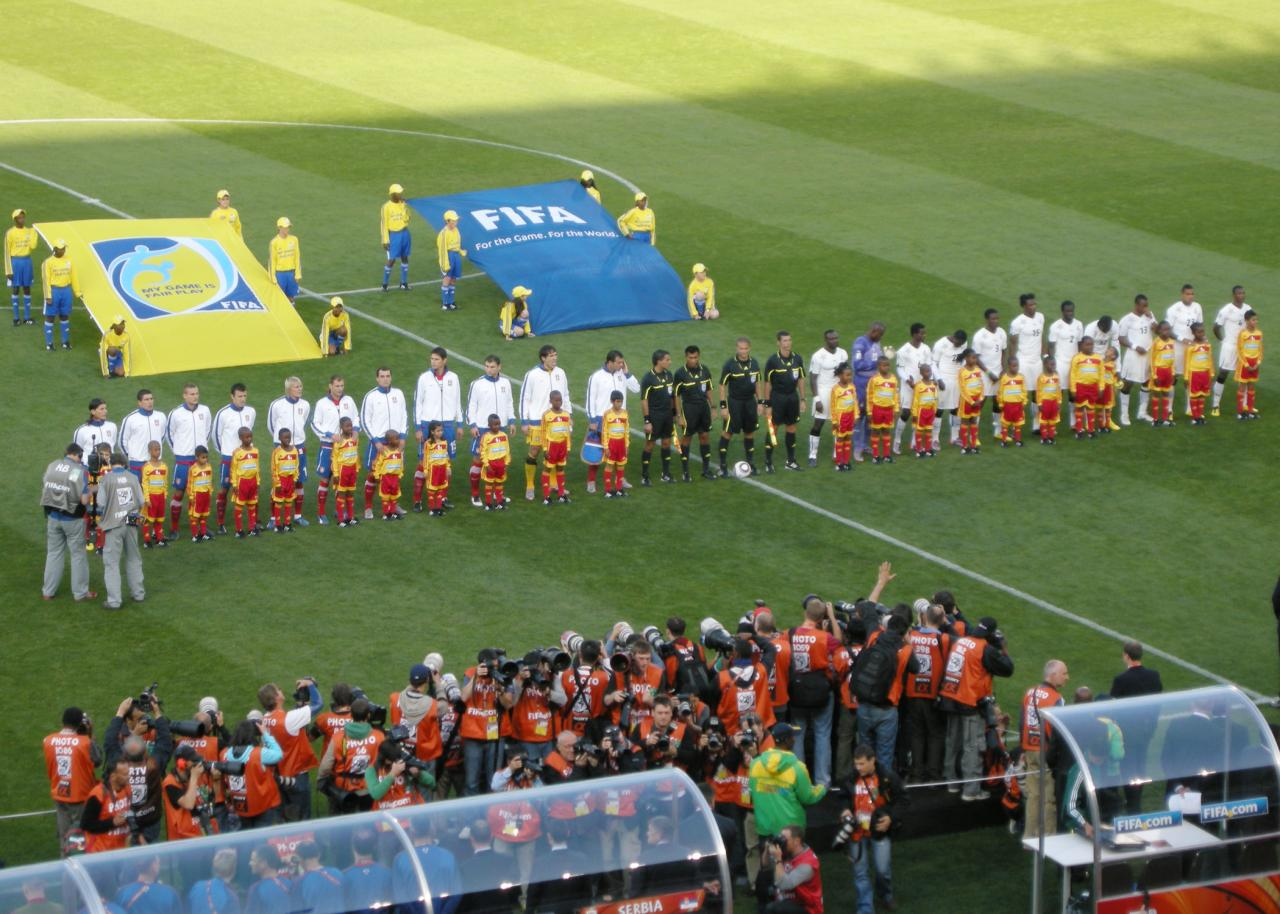
Serbia vs Ghana

Man of the Match:
Asamoah Gyan (Ghana)

Assistant referees:
Ricardo Casas (Argentina)
Hernán Maidana (Argentina)
Fourth official:
Subkhiddin Mohd Salleh (Malaysia)
Fifth official:
Jeffrey Goh Gek Pheng (Singapore)

=== Germany vs Australia ===
Veteran Germany skipper Michael Ballack was ruled out of the tournament with injury, and coach Joachim Loew opted for the second-youngest squad in the competition.

Prior to the game, Australia coach Pim Verbeek made the surprising decision to bench veteran players Harry Kewell, Mark Bresciano and Joshua Kennedy, instead opting to put Tim Cahill in a lone striker role with Richard Garcia in support.

Australia had the chance to score an early goal from a corner in the third minute, but Tim Cahill's header was blocked by Lucas Neill, and Richard Garcia failed to score from the follow up.

Lukas Podolski opened the scoring for Germany in the eighth minute and Miroslav Klose put Germany 2–0 up in the 26th minute. After half-time, Tim Cahill was given a straight red card for a challenge on Bastian Schweinsteiger, and Thomas Müller and substitute Cacau both scored, completing the 4–0 victory for Germany, which marked its sixth successive opening match victory at the World Cup.

After the match, despite the heavy defeat, Australia coach Pim Verbeek stood by his tactics to keep his veteran players benched. Germany coach Joachim Loew described the victory as "a good warm-up" for his team.

In 2011, SBS (Australia's World Cup broadcaster) soccer analyst Les Murray published a book titled The World Game: The Story of How Football Went Global, in which Murray cited an undisclosed source in alleging that Lucas Neill, the captain of Australia, had instigated a mutiny just before kick-off. Murray alleged that Neill had asked the coach, Pim Verbeek, to leave the room, before describing Verbeek's game-plan as "bullshit" and erasing what the Dutchman had written on a whiteboard, telling the team to play like they normally do. Neill protested that before the Germany game it was Mark Schwarzer, and not Neill himself, who had given the team pep talk. A few days after the allegations hit the news, Murray retracted his allegations with a full apology, with an undertaking that future editions of his book would have the relevant portion deleted.

13 June 2010
20:30

| Germany | 4–0 | Australia |
|---|---|---|
| Podolski 8'; Klose 26'; Müller 68'; Cacau 70' |

Moses Mabhida Stadium, Durban
Attendance: 62,660
Referee: Marco Rodríguez (Mexico)

| Germany | Australia |

| GK | 1 | Manuel Neuer |
| RB | 16 | Philipp Lahm (c) |
| CB | 3 | Arne Friedrich |
| CB | 17 | Per Mertesacker |
| LB | 14 | Holger Badstuber |
| CM | 7 | Bastian Schweinsteiger |
| CM | 6 | Sami Khedira |
| RW | 13 | Thomas Müller |
| AM | 8 | Mesut Özil | (yellow card) 12' | (substituted off) 74' |
| LW | 10 | Lukas Podolski | | (substituted off) 81' |
| CF | 11 | Miroslav Klose | | (substituted off) 68' |
Substitutions:
| FW | 19 | Cacau | (yellow card) 90+2' | (substituted on) 68' |
| FW | 23 | Mario Gómez | | (substituted on) 74' |
| MF | 21 | Marko Marin | | (substituted on) 81' |
Manager:
Joachim Löw

| GK | 1 | Mark Schwarzer |
| RB | 8 | Luke Wilkshire |
| CB | 3 | Craig Moore | (yellow card) 24' |
| CB | 2 | Lucas Neill (c) | (yellow card) 46' |
| LB | 11 | Scott Chipperfield |
| CM | 16 | Carl Valeri | (yellow card) 58' |
| CM | 13 | Vince Grella | | (substituted off) 46' |
| RW | 7 | Brett Emerton | | (substituted off) 74' |
| AM | 5 | Jason Culina |
| LW | 19 | Richard Garcia | | (substituted off) 64' |
| CF | 4 | Tim Cahill | (red card) 56' |
Substitutions:
| FW | 14 | Brett Holman | | (substituted on) 46' |
| FW | 17 | Nikita Rukavytsya | | (substituted on) 64' |
| MF | 15 | Mile Jedinak | | (substituted on) 74' |
Manager:
(Netherlands) Pim Verbeek

Man of the Match:
Lukas Podolski (Germany)

Assistant referees:
José Luis Camargo (Mexico)
Alberto Morín (Mexico)
Fourth official:
Martin Hansson (Sweden)
Fifth official:
Henrik Andrén (Sweden)

=== Germany vs Serbia ===
Germany striker Miroslav Klose was sent off in the first half, and Serbia went ahead shortly afterwards with a goal from winger Milan Jovanović.

In the 59th minute, Serbia centre-back Nemanja Vidić was booked for a handball in the penalty box, but the ensuing penalty kick from Lukas Podolski was saved by goalkeeper Vladimir Stojković.

This was Germany's first loss in the group stage of a World Cup since the 1986 edition of the tournament, and their first penalty miss in a World Cup (excluding penalty shoot-outs) since 1974.

18 June 2010
13:30

| Germany | 0–1 | Serbia |
|---|---|---|
| | | Jovanović 38' |

Nelson Mandela Bay Stadium, Port Elizabeth
Attendance: 38,294
Referee: Alberto Undiano Mallenco (Spain)

| Germany | Serbia |

| GK | 1 | Manuel Neuer |
| RB | 16 | Philipp Lahm (c) | (yellow card) 32' |
| CB | 3 | Arne Friedrich |
| CB | 17 | Per Mertesacker |
| LB | 14 | Holger Badstuber | | (substituted off) 77' |
| CM | 6 | Sami Khedira | (yellow card) 22' |
| CM | 7 | Bastian Schweinsteiger | (yellow card) 73' |
| RW | 13 | Thomas Müller | | (substituted off) 70' |
| AM | 8 | Mesut Özil | | (substituted off) 70' |
| LW | 10 | Lukas Podolski |
| CF | 11 | Miroslav Klose | (yellow card) 12' (yellow-red card) 37' |
Substitutions:
| FW | 19 | Cacau | | (substituted on) 70' |
| MF | 21 | Marko Marin | | (substituted on) 70' |
| FW | 23 | Mario Gómez | | (substituted on) 77' |
Manager:
Joachim Löw

| GK | 1 | Vladimir Stojković |
| RB | 6 | Branislav Ivanović | (yellow card) 18' |
| CB | 20 | Neven Subotić | (yellow card) 57' |
| CB | 5 | Nemanja Vidić | (yellow card) 59' |
| LB | 3 | Aleksandar Kolarov | (yellow card) 19' |
| DM | 22 | Zdravko Kuzmanović | | (substituted off) 75' |
| CM | 18 | Miloš Ninković | | (substituted off) 70' |
| CM | 10 | Dejan Stanković (c) |
| RW | 17 | Miloš Krasić |
| LW | 14 | Milan Jovanović | | (substituted off) 79' |
| CF | 15 | Nikola Žigić |
Substitutions:
| MF | 4 | Gojko Kačar | | (substituted on) 70' |
| MF | 19 | Radosav Petrović | | (substituted on) 75' |
| FW | 8 | Danko Lazović | | (substituted on) 79' |
Manager:
Radomir Antić

Man of the Match:
Vladimir Stojković (Serbia)

Assistant referees:
Fermín Martínez (Spain)
Juan Carlos Yuste Jiménez (Spain)
Fourth official:
Martín Vázquez (Uruguay)
Fifth official:
Carlos Pastorino (Uruguay)

=== Ghana vs Australia ===
With Tim Cahill serving a one match suspension after his red card against Germany, Pim Verbeek opted to start veteran forward Harry Kewell. Australia took an early lead when a freekick from Mark Bresciano was fumbled by Ghana goalkeeper Richard Kingson into the path of Brett Holman, who clipped the ball into the top corner of the Ghana goal.

Later in the first half, Jonathan Mensah struck a powerful shot towards the Australia goal which was blocked on the goal line by Harry Kewell's upper arm. Kewell was shown a straight red card and a penalty was awarded to Ghana. Asamoah Gyan converted the penalty kick, sending Australia goalkeeper Mark Schwarzer the wrong way. It was Gyan's second successful penalty of the tournament.

Ghana made the most of their man advantage after Kewell's dismissal and applied pressure on Australia. Kevin-Prince Boateng made his way into the Australia penalty box and unleashed a powerful right-footed shot that was parried around the post by Schwarzer, and shortly after the half-time break, Schwarzer parried a curling shot from Gyan.

As the second half continued, Ghana appeared to lack creativity and instead resorted to long range shots. Out of the 22 shots taken, only six were on target. Australia substitute Scott Chipperfield headed over the bar from a Luke Wilkshire cross, then shortly afterwards, Wilkshire himself found himself one on one with the Ghana goalkeepr, but his weak shot was smothered by Kingson. Josh Kennedy was unable to make solid contact with the rebound, and the ball was subsequently saved and cleared.

Late in the second half, Ghana had the opportunity to take the lead when Quincy Owusu-Abeyie took a fine strike towards the Australia goal which was saved by Schwarzer, and the game finished 1–1 shortly afterwards.

After the match, Australia coach Pim Verbeek praised his team's efforts for getting a draw with a man sent off, but felt the red card against Harry Kewell was harsh and there was nothing Kewell could've done other than cutting his arm off. Kewell watched the match from the team dressing room after his dismissal and later stated that the referee had killed his World Cup tournament.

19 June 2010
16:00

| Ghana | 1–1 | Australia |
|---|---|---|
| Gyan 25' (pen.) | | Holman 11' |

Royal Bafokeng Stadium, Rustenburg
Attendance: 34,812
Referee: Roberto Rosetti (Italy)

| Ghana | Australia |

| GK | 22 | Richard Kingson (c) |
| RB | 4 | John Paintsil |
| CB | 8 | Jonathan Mensah | (yellow card) 79' |
| CB | 19 | Lee Addy | (yellow card) 40' |
| LB | 2 | Hans Sarpei |
| DM | 6 | Anthony Annan | (yellow card) 84' |
| CM | 23 | Kevin-Prince Boateng | | (substituted off) 87' |
| RW | 12 | Prince Tagoe | | (substituted off) 56' |
| AM | 21 | Kwadwo Asamoah | | (substituted off) 77' |
| LW | 13 | André Ayew |
| CF | 3 | Asamoah Gyan |
Substitutions:
| MF | 20 | Quincy Owusu-Abeyie | | (substituted on) 56' |
| MF | 11 | Sulley Muntari | | (substituted on) 77' |
| FW | 14 | Matthew Amoah | | (substituted on) 87' |
Manager:
(Serbia) Milovan Rajevac

| GK | 1 | Mark Schwarzer |
| RB | 8 | Luke Wilkshire | | (substituted off) 84' |
| CB | 2 | Lucas Neill (c) |
| CB | 3 | Craig Moore | (yellow card) 85' |
| LB | 21 | David Carney |
| CM | 5 | Jason Culina |
| CM | 16 | Carl Valeri |
| RW | 7 | Brett Emerton |
| AM | 14 | Brett Holman | | (substituted off) 68' |
| LW | 23 | Mark Bresciano | | (substituted off) 66' |
| CF | 10 | Harry Kewell | (red card) 24' |
Substitutions:
| DF | 11 | Scott Chipperfield | | (substituted on) 66' |
| FW | 9 | Joshua Kennedy | | (substituted on) 68' |
| FW | 17 | Nikita Rukavytsya | | (substituted on) 84' |
Manager:
(Netherlands) Pim Verbeek

Man of the Match:
Asamoah Gyan (Ghana)

Assistant referees:
Paolo Calcagno (Italy)
Stefano Ayroldi (Italy)
Fourth official:
Carlos Simon (Brazil)
Fifth official:
Altemir Hausmann (Brazil)

=== Ghana vs Germany ===
This was the first fixture in World Cup history to feature two brothers on opposing sides - Jérôme Boateng for Germany, and Kevin-Prince Boateng for Ghana. Striker Cacau started the game in place of veteran scorer Miroslav Klose, who was suspended for the game after picking up a red card in Germany's loss to Serbia.

Both teams had chances to score in the first half - André Ayew managed a shot within the Germany penalty area, and Mesut Özil was denied by Ghana goalkeeper Richard Kingson.

After 60 minutes, Germany took the lead when Özil's long-range strike from outside the penalty box went into the top corner of the Ghana goal. Moments later, Ghana almost found an instant equalizer when Boateng cleared Prince Tagoe's header off the line.

When the game finished 1–0 to Germany, Ghana waited for the result from Nelspruit, where Australia was playing Serbia. With Australia winning 2–1, they finished on equal points as Ghana, but Ghana pipped them to second spot due to having a superior goal difference, thereby qualifying for the round of 16 as the sole team representing Africa.

23 June 2010
20:30

| Ghana | 0–1 | Germany |
|---|---|---|
| | | Özil 60' |

Soccer City, Johannesburg
Attendance: 83,391
Referee: Carlos Simon (Brazil)

| Ghana | Germany |

| GK | 22 | Richard Kingson |
| RB | 4 | John Paintsil |
| CB | 5 | John Mensah (c) |
| CB | 8 | Jonathan Mensah |
| LB | 2 | Hans Sarpei |
| DM | 6 | Anthony Annan |
| CM | 23 | Kevin-Prince Boateng |
| CM | 21 | Kwadwo Asamoah |
| RW | 12 | Prince Tagoe | | (substituted off) 64' |
| LW | 13 | André Ayew | (yellow card) 40' | (substituted off) 90+2' |
| CF | 3 | Asamoah Gyan | | (substituted off) 82' |
Substitutions:
| MF | 11 | Sulley Muntari | | (substituted on) 64' |
| FW | 14 | Matthew Amoah | | (substituted on) 82' |
| FW | 18 | Dominic Adiyiah | | (substituted on) 90+2' |
Manager:
(Serbia) Milovan Rajevac

| GK | 1 | Manuel Neuer |
| RB | 16 | Philipp Lahm (c) |
| CB | 17 | Per Mertesacker |
| CB | 3 | Arne Friedrich |
| LB | 20 | Jérôme Boateng | | (substituted off) 73' |
| CM | 7 | Bastian Schweinsteiger | | (substituted off) 81' |
| CM | 6 | Sami Khedira |
| RW | 13 | Thomas Müller | (yellow card) 43' | (substituted off) 67' |
| AM | 8 | Mesut Özil |
| LW | 10 | Lukas Podolski |
| CF | 19 | Cacau |
Substitutions:
| MF | 15 | Piotr Trochowski | | (substituted on) 67' |
| MF | 2 | Marcell Jansen | | (substituted on) 73' |
| MF | 18 | Toni Kroos | | (substituted on) 81' |
Manager:
Joachim Löw

Man of the Match:
Mesut Özil (Germany)

Assistant referees:
Altemir Hausmann (Brazil)
Roberto Braatz (Brazil)
Fourth official:
Martín Vázquez (Uruguay)
Fifth official:
Carlos Pastorino (Uruguay)

=== Australia vs Serbia ===
Australia came into the fixture seeking their first win of the tournament. Serbia, having defeated Germany in their previous fixture, only required a draw to progress to the knockout stage.

Harry Kewell, serving a suspension after his sending off against Ghana, was replaced by Joshua Kennedy. This was the first time Kennedy was included in the starting line-up at this World Cup.

In the opening minutes, Serbia had the better of the chances, with Miloš Krasić getting into Australia's penalty area and tumbling following his shirt being pulled by Carl Valeri, but appeals for a penalty were waved away. Minutes later, Krasić found himself one-on-one with Australia goalkeeper Mark Schwarzer, but was forced to shoot wide.

In the second half, Australia showed more attacking intent, with Mark Bresciano drawing a fine save from Serbia goalkeeper Vladimir Stojković. After 69 minutes, Luke Wilkshire's cross into the penalty box was headed into the Serbia goal by Tim Cahill. Four minutes later, Brett Holman doubled the advantage for Australia with a long-range strike.

Substitute Marko Pantelić pulled a goal back for Serbia in the 84th minute after Schwarzer spilled a shot from Zoran Tošić. Moments later, Pantelić scored what looked like an equalizing goal, but it was cancelled for offside. At the end of the match, Serbia were denied claims for a penalty when Cahill handballed in his own penalty area after rising for a header.

With the game finishing 2–1 to Australia and Ghana losing to Germany 1–0, Australia ended their campaign third in the group due to their inferior goal difference. Germany topped the group to face England in the round of 16, and Ghana went on to face the United States.

This match was coach Pim Verbeek's last in charge of Australia.

23 June 2010
20:30

| Australia | 2–1 | Serbia |
|---|---|---|
| Cahill 69'; Holman 73' | | Pantelić 84' |

Mbombela Stadium, Nelspruit
Attendance: 37,836
Referee: Jorge Larrionda (Uruguay)

| Australia | Serbia |

| GK | 1 | Mark Schwarzer |
| RB | 8 | Luke Wilkshire | (yellow card) 50' | (substituted off) 82' |
| CB | 6 | Michael Beauchamp | (yellow card) 49' |
| CB | 2 | Lucas Neill (c) |
| LB | 21 | David Carney |
| CM | 5 | Jason Culina |
| CM | 16 | Carl Valeri | | (substituted off) 66' |
| RW | 7 | Brett Emerton | (yellow card) 67' |
| AM | 4 | Tim Cahill |
| LW | 23 | Mark Bresciano | | (substituted off) 66' |
| CF | 9 | Joshua Kennedy |
Substitutions:
| DF | 11 | Scott Chipperfield | | (substituted on) 66' |
| FW | 14 | Brett Holman | | (substituted on) 66' |
| MF | 19 | Richard Garcia | | (substituted on) 82' |
Manager:
(Netherlands) Pim Verbeek

| GK | 1 | Vladimir Stojković |
| RB | 6 | Branislav Ivanović |
| CB | 5 | Nemanja Vidić |
| CB | 13 | Aleksandar Luković | (yellow card) 18' |
| LB | 16 | Ivan Obradović |
| DM | 22 | Zdravko Kuzmanović | | (substituted off) 77' |
| CM | 10 | Dejan Stanković (c) |
| CM | 18 | Miloš Ninković | (yellow card) 59' |
| RW | 17 | Miloš Krasić | | (substituted off) 62' |
| LW | 14 | Milan Jovanović |
| CF | 15 | Nikola Žigić | | (substituted off) 67' |
Substitutions:
| MF | 7 | Zoran Tošić | | (substituted on) 62' |
| FW | 9 | Marko Pantelić | | (substituted on) 67' |
| FW | 8 | Danko Lazović | | (substituted on) 77' |
Manager:
Radomir Antić

Man of the Match:
Tim Cahill (Australia)

Assistant referees:
Pablo Fandino (Uruguay)
Mauricio Espinosa (Uruguay)
Fourth official:
Carlos Batres (Guatemala)
Fifth official:
Leonel Leal (Costa Rica)

== See also ==
- Australia at the FIFA World Cup
- Germany at the FIFA World Cup
- Ghana at the FIFA World Cup
- Serbia at the FIFA World Cup
