= Haminu Draman =

Ghanaian footballer (born 1986)

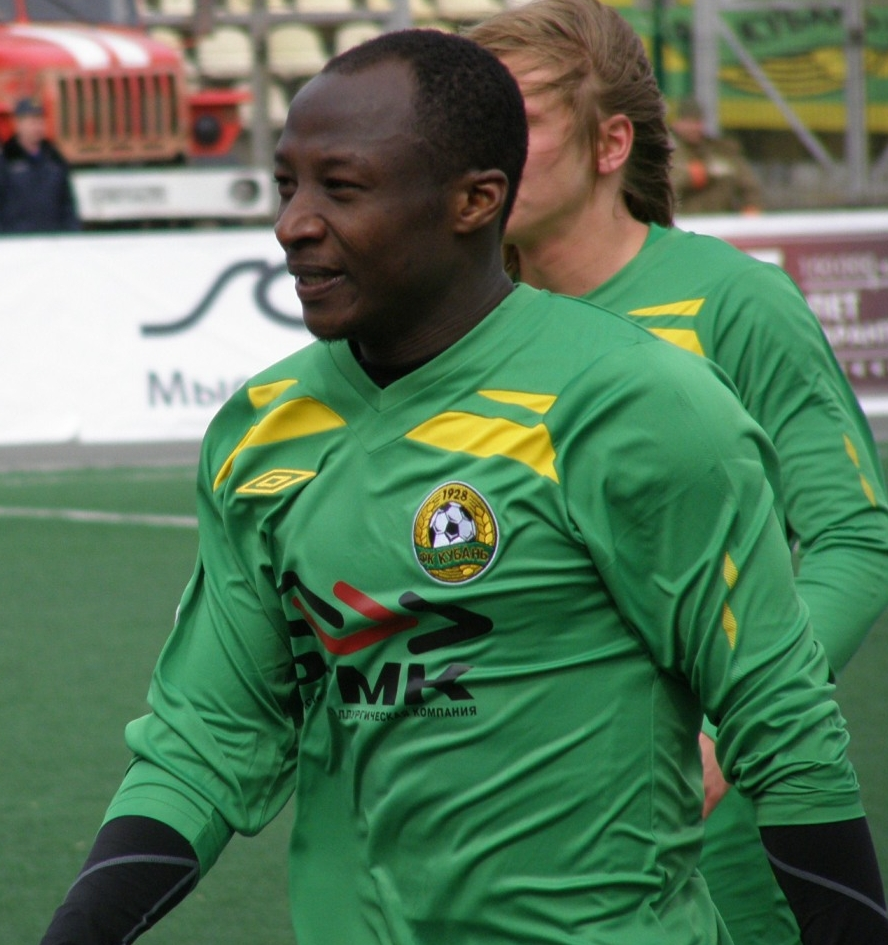
- Draman playing for Kuban

Personal information
- Full name: Haminu Draman
- Date of birth: 1 April 1986 (age 40)
- Place of birth: Techiman, Ghana
- Height: 1.73 m (5 ft 8 in)
- Position: Midfielder

Senior career*
Years	Team	Apps	(Gls)
2004–2005	Heart of Lions	3	(0)
2005–2006	Red Star Belgrade	4	(1)
2006–2007	Gençlerbirliği	31	(2)
2007–2011	Lokomotiv Moscow	8	(0)
2009	→ Kuban (loan)	27	(3)
2011–2013	Arles-Avignon	30	(2)
2013–2014	Gil Vicente	3	(0)
2014	Asante Kotoko		
2015	Charlotte Independence	2	(0)
2016	Infonet	23	(3)

International career
2005–2010	Ghana	43	(4)
- * Club domestic league appearances and goals

Haminu Draman (born 1 April 1986) is a Ghanaian former professional footballer who played as a midfielder.

== Club career ==
Having started his career in Ghana with Heart of Lions, Draman joined Serbian club Red Star Belgrade for the 2005–06. Having won the championship and the cup with Red Star he moved to Turkey, where he made 31 league appearances for Gençlerbirliği as they finished sixth in the Turkish Süper Lig.

=== Lokomotiv Moscow ===
Draman signed a three-year contract with Russian Cup winners Lokomotiv Moscow on 19 June 2007. Draman joined Lokomotiv when the Russian transfer window opened on 1 August 2007. He was expected to replace Russian international Marat Izmailov, who is on loan to Portuguese club Sporting CP for a year.

Following the transfer of Draman Gençlerbirliği's coach Ersun Yanal quit after just over a week in charge because he disagreed with the club's decision. Yanal, who had previously been coach of Gençlerbirliği before leaving to become the Turkey national team coach, had signed a three-year contract with the club on 1 June 2007. "The chairman's promises seem to have changed from the way they were before the agreement we made" Yanal said. "We would like to be a strong team but we sold Draman. The club want to try some players on trial in the meantime but this is not the way that I work. Gençlerbirliği chairman Cavcav, who had been in charge of the club for 30 years, responded by saying: "We met with the coach before and then I told him that I have to sell Draman to Locomotiv Moskva because all of the negotiations were over and I promised to sell him.

==== Loan to Kuban Krasnodar ====
It was reported that English Premiership side Stoke City were interested in signing Draman because of his speed and skills in the January 2008 transfer window, and that a fee of €3 million had been agreed.

On 18 February 2009, Draman signed for Kuban Krasnodar on loan from Lokomotiv Moscow. He played 23 matches and scored 3 goals by the end of the season.

=== Arles-Avignon ===
On 11 July 2011, Draman signed a one-year contract with French Ligue 2 side AC Arles-Avignon.

In July 2013, Draman signed a two-year contract for Portuguese club Gil Vicente on a free transfer. This was after he had left Arles Avignon due to unpaid salary.

=== Asante Kotoko ===
Draman left Gil Vicente during the winter-break, and by early 2014, he was back in Ghana, after almost a decade, signing with Asante Kotoko. His return turned out to be a great success as he won the double, the 2013–14 Ghanaian Premier League and the 2014 Ghanaian FA Cup during his half-year spell with Asante Kotoko back in Ghana.

=== FC Infonet ===
Draman signed for Estonian club FC Infonet in January 2016. With 3 goals in 23 appearances he helped them win their first ever national title, the 2016 Meistriliiga.

== International career ==
Draman was 19 when he made his international debut for Ghana in a friendly against Saudi Arabia in Riyadh on 14 November 2005. He is a member of the national team, and was called up to the 2006 World Cup. He scored his first goal of the tournament against the U.S. on 22 June 2006.

He took a starring role in Ghana's International friendly against former World Champions Brazil on 27 March 2007 where the Ghanaians lost 1–0, terrorising the Samba Boys right back Ilsinho, before being dismissed late in the game for a second bookable offence on Ilsinho's replacement Dani Alves.

=== Note on name ===
There was some confusion during the 2006 FIFA World Cup as Draman's surname was misspelled DRAMANI on the back of his shirt and, as a result, on FIFA documents. The Ghanaian FA confirmed his name was Draman. He also confirmed this himself in an interview to Sport Express, a Russian newspaper.

== Career statistics ==
Appearances and goals by national team and year
National team	Year	Apps	Goals
Ghana	2005	1	0
Ghana	2006	12	2
Ghana	2007	4	0
Ghana	2008	14	1
Ghana	2009	7	1
Ghana	2010	5	0
Total		43	4

Scores and results list Ghana's goal tally first, score column indicates score after each Draman goal.

List of international goals scored by Haminu Draman
No.	Date	Venue	Opponent	Score	Result	Competition	Ref.
1	22 June 2006	Frankenstadion, Nuremberg, Germany	United States	1–0	2–1	2006 FIFA World Cup Group E	
2	4 October 2006	Nissan Stadium, Yokohama, Japan	Japan	1–0	1–0	Friendly	
3	9 February 2008	Baba Yara Stadium, Kumasi, Ghana	Ivory Coast	4–2	4–2	2008 Africa Cup of Nations	
4	12 August 2009	Brisbane Road, London, England	Zambia	4–1	4–1	Friendly	

== Honours ==
Red Star Belgrade

- First League of Serbia and Montenegro: 2005–06
- Serbia and Montenegro Cup: 2006

Lokomotiv Moscow

- Russian Cup: 2007

Asante Kotoko

- Ghana Premier League: 2013–14
- Ghanaian FA Cup: 2014

Infonet

- Meistriliiga: 2016

Ghana

- Africa Cup of Nations: 2010 (runner-up)
