= Illiasu Shilla =

Ghanaian footballer (born 1982)

Personal information
- Full name: Illiasu Shilla Alhassan
- Date of birth: 26 October 1982 (age 44)
- Place of birth: Tema, Ghana
- Height: 1.88 m (6 ft 2 in)
- Position: Defender

Youth career
- 2001–2002: Real Republicans

Senior career*
Years	Team	Apps	(Gls)
2003–2005	King Faisal Babes	69	(3)
2005–2006	Asante Kotoko	32	(6)
2006–2008	FC Saturn	29	(1)
2010	Real Tamale United	4	(0)
2011–2013	Impuls Dilijan	52	(1)
Total		186	(11)

International career
2006–2008	Ghana	13	(0)
- * Club domestic league appearances and goals

Illiasu Shilla Alhassan (born 26 October 1982) is a Ghanaian former professional footballer who played as a defender.

== Career ==
Illiasu was born in Tema, Ghana, and began his career in Kumasi with Real Republicans—a youth club—and then King Faisal Babes, where he played in two successive campaigns in the African Confederations Cup in 2004 and 2005.

The tough tackling defender then moved to Asante Kotoko and won a place in Ghana's squad for the 2006 World Cup, despite having never played for the national team, and was only one of just four domestic-based players.

Shilla replaced Issah Ahmed at Kotoko in January 2006, and his performances in recent months were enough to convince coach Ratomir Dujkovic to take him to Germany.

His impressive performances at the World Cup grabbed the attentions of a number of big European clubs. After trials at Arsenal and Blackburn Rovers he eventually joined Russian club FC Saturn.

Shilla's contract with Saturn was cancelled in 2008. He then returned to Ghana and had to spend three years recovering from an ankle injury. He restarted his football career in 2011, signing with top-flight club Real Tamale United.

== Personal life ==
His older brother Shilla Alhassan, played with him at Real Tamale United and played formerly for Guan United FC.
