= Issah Gabriel Ahmed =

Ghanaian footballer

Issah Ahmed
Personal information
- Full name: Issah Gabriel Ahmed
- Date of birth: 24 May 1982 (age 44)
- Place of birth: Dawu, Ghana
- Height: 1.85 m (6 ft 1 in)
- Position: Defender

Senior career*
Years	Team	Apps	(Gls)
2001–2003	Dawu Youngstars		
2003	Accra Great Olympics		
2004–2005	Asante Kotoko		
2005–2011	Randers	97	(5)

International career
2005–2008	Ghana	13	(0)
- * Club domestic league appearances and goals

Issah Gabriel Ahmed or Issah Gabarel Ahmad (born 24 May 1982) is a Ghanaian former professional footballer who played as a defender.

== Club career ==
Ahmed signed a new contract with Randers FC in the end of July 2008.

== International career ==
Ahmed was a member of the Ghana national team. He was called up to the 2006 World Cup as one of three Ghana-based players at the 2006 World Cup.
