= Razak Pimpong =

Ghanaian footballer (born 1982)

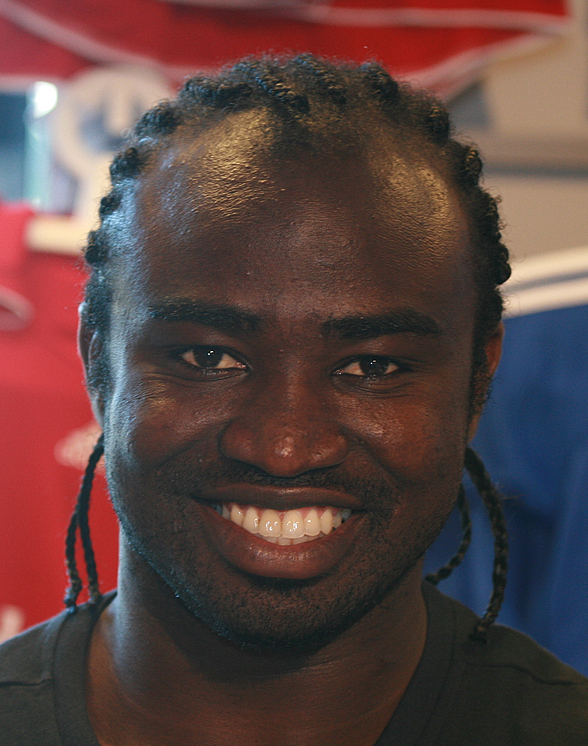
- Pimpong in 2008

Personal information
- Full name: Razak Pimpong
- Date of birth: 30 December 1982 (age 43)
- Place of birth: Accra, Ghana
- Height: 1.73 m (5 ft 8 in)
- Positions: Striker; attacking midfielder

Team information
- Current team: Aulum IF (Manager)

Youth career
- Golden Tulip
- Great Olympics

Senior career*
Years	Team	Apps	(Gls)
2000–2006	Midtjylland	125	(22)
2006–2007	Copenhagen	21	(0)
2007–2009	Viking	16	(2)
2008	→ Aalesund (loan)	8	(0)
2009	El Masry	10	(0)
2009–2013	Viborg	98	(6)
2013	Ringkøbing		

International career
2002–2006	Ghana	10	(1)

Managerial career
- 2013: Ringkøbing (Playing assistant)
- 2014–2017: Møldrup/Tostrup IF
- 2018–: Aulum IF
- * Club domestic league appearances and goals

Razak Pimpong (born 30 December 1982) is a Ghanaian former professional footballer who played as a striker and attacking midfielder for FC Midtjylland, FC Copenhagen, Viborg FF and other clubs. He was very versatile and could also play wide either as a right sided midfielder or right winger.

== Club career ==
Pimpong was brought from Ghana to Denmark by FC Midtjylland, and made his debut for the team in 2000. He played more than 100 times for FCM, scoring 25 league goals for the club. In July 2005, he agreed a move to league rivals F.C. København from January 2006.

Pimpong did not find initial success at FCK. His first, and only goal, for FCK came in April 2006, when he scored the deciding goal of the 2006 Royal League Final. He came on in the 69th minute and scored the only goal of the game in the 89th minute before he was sent off in injury time for overtly celebrating his goal.

In 2007, Pimpong was transferred to Norwegian Tippeligaen club Viking FK for a sum reported to be around 4 million Norwegian Kroner. He signed a contract keeping him at the club until 2010.

In February 2009, Egyptian side Al-Masry signed Pimpong from Viking FK. A few months later, on 27 July 2009, he signed for Danish club Viborg FF.

On 24 June 2013, he announced his retirement from professional football, but a month later he regretted his decision and made a six-month deal with the Danish 2nd Division West club Ringkøbing IF.

== International career ==
Pimpong was part of the Ghanaian 2004 Olympic football team, who exited in the first round, having finished in third place in group B.

He was called up for the Ghanaian squad for the 2006 FIFA World Cup in Germany. He has played nine games for the Ghana national team, and represented Ghana at the 2004 Summer Olympic football tournament as well as the 2006 World Cup in Germany. In Ghana's final group match against the United States, he won a controversial first-half penalty, after referee Markus Merk judged Oguchi Onyewu to have fouled him inside the box while attempting to win a header; the penalty was converted by Stephen Appiah, with Ghana winning the match 2–1 and advancing to the round of 16.

== Personal life ==
Pimpong's son Malik Pimpong is also a professional footballer.

== Honours and awards ==
Ghana U20

- FIFA World Youth Championship runner-up: 2001

F.C. Copenhagen

- Danish Superliga: 2005–06
