= Emmanuel Pappoe =

Ghanaian footballer

Personal information
- Full name: Emmanuel Addoquaye Pappoe
- Date of birth: 3 March 1981 (age 45)
- Place of birth: Accra, Ghana
- Height: 1.77 m (5 ft 10 in)
- Position: Defender

Youth career
- Liberty Babies

Senior career*
Years	Team	Apps	(Gls)
2001–2003	Liberty Professionals		
2003–2005	Ashdod	57	(4)
2005–2007	Hapoel Kfar Saba	59	(4)
2007–2009	AEK Larnaca	45	(0)
2009	Hapoel Haifa	4	(0)
2010	Beitar Shimshon Tel Aviv	15	(0)
2010–2012	Liberty Professionals		

International career
2002–2006	Ghana	28	(0)
- * Club domestic league appearances and goals

Emmanuel Addoquaye Pappoe (also spelled Pappoa, born 3 March 1981 in Accra) is a former Ghanaian professional footballer who played as a defender.

== Club career ==
Pappoe was born in Accra. Prior to joining AEK Larnaca in summer 2007, Pappoe plied his trade in the Israeli Premier League, playing two seasons each with F.C. Ashdod (2003–05), Hapoel Kfar Saba (2005–07) and Hapoel Haifa until December 2009. He left Beitar Shimshon Tel Aviv of the Israeli Liga Leumit in October 2010 and returned to his youth club Liberty Professionals F.C.

== International career ==
Pappoe was part of the Ghanaian 2004 Olympic football team who exited in the first round, having finished in third place in group B. His hard work earned him a call-up to the senior side, making his debut against Sierra Leone on 19 October 2002.

He was selected to represent the nation at the 2006 FIFA World Cup, where he made two appearances in four matches, as the unfancied Africans bowed out to world powers Brazil in the round-of-16 match.

== Honours ==
=== International ===
Ghana

- FIFA World Youth Championship runner-up: 2001
