= Milovan Rajevac =

Serbian footballer

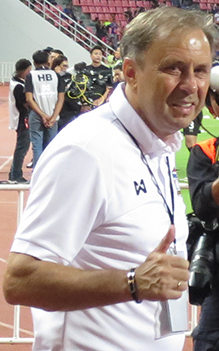
- Rajevac coaching Thailand in 2017

Personal information
- Date of birth: 2 January 1954 (age 72)
- Place of birth: Čajetina, PR Serbia, Yugoslavia
- Position: Defender

Senior career*
Years	Team	Apps	(Gls)
1973–1977	Borac Čačak	64	(2)
1977–1978	Red Star Belgrade	13	(0)
1979–1980	Vojvodina	15	(0)
1981–1982	New York Arrows	11	(1)
1982–1984	Borac Čačak	25	(0)
1984–1985	Lunds BK		
1985–1986	Sloboda Titovo Užice	3	(0)

International career
1976	Yugoslavia Olympic		

Managerial career
- 1989–1992: Borac Čačak
- 1992–1994: KSF Srbija Malmö
- 1994–1996: Sloboda Užice
- 1996–1998: Progres Frankfurt
- 1998–2000: Železnik (assistant)
- 2000–2003: Beijing Guoan (assistant)
- 2004: Red Star Belgrade (caretaker)
- 2004–2005: Al Sadd (assistant)
- 2006–2007: Vojvodina
- 2008: Borac Čačak
- 2008–2010: Ghana
- 2010–2011: Al-Ahli
- 2011: Qatar
- 2016: Rudar Velenje
- 2016: Algeria
- 2017–2019: Thailand
- 2021–2022: Ghana
Medal record
Men's football
Representing Ghana (as manager)
Africa Cup of Nations
Runner-up	2010
- * Club domestic league appearances and goals

Milovan Rajevac (Serbian Cyrillic: Милован Рајевац; born 2 January 1954) is a Serbian football manager and former professional player.

== Playing career ==
Rajevac was born in Čajetina.

He played as a defender for Borac Čačak (1973–1977), Red Star Belgrade (1977–1978), and FKVojvodina (1979–1980) in Yugoslavia. From 1981 to 1982, he played for the New York Arrows of the Major Indoor Soccer League (MISL) (as "Mike Rajevac"). In 1982, he returned to the Yugoslav First League and played for Borac Čačak until 1984. For the 1984–1985 season, he played for Lunds BK in Sweden, and finished his playing career with Sloboda Užice in 1986.

== Managerial career ==
Rajevac coached a number of club sides in his native Serbia, including Sloboda Užice, Red Star Belgrade, FK Vojvodina and FK Borac Čačak.

He became Ghana manager in August 2008. He continued the Black Stars's qualification campaign to 2010 World Cup. In the tournament, they almost reached the semi-final as they narrowly lost to Uruguay in the quarter-final via penalty shootout.

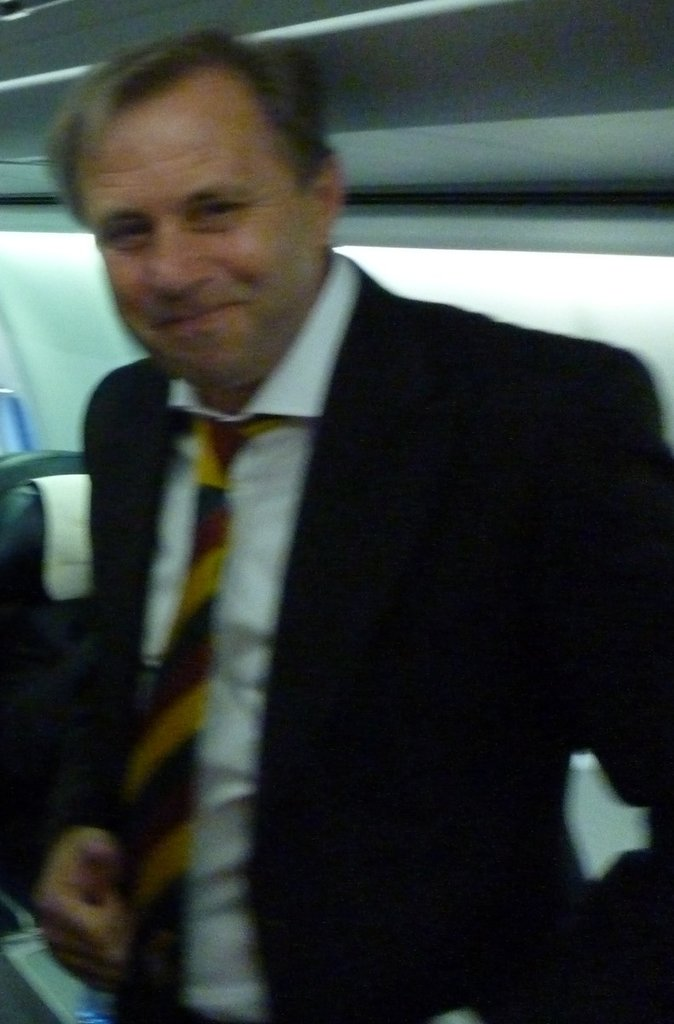
Coach Milovan Rajevac with the Ghana national football team

Rajevac quit Ghana after the World Cup on 8 September 2010, and took up a position with Saudi Arabian team Al-Ahli a day later.

He left the Saudi club in February 2011 to take up the role as national team coach for Qatar. He was relieved of duties in August 2011.

In September 2011, Rajevac was one of four managers linked with the Egyptian national team, and in February 2014 he was one of four managers linked with the Burkina Faso national team.

On 15 June 2016, he was officially appointed as manager of Rudar Velenje in Slovenia. However, on 26 June 2016 he was appointed as manager of the Algerian national team. He resigned from the position in October 2016, after two matches.

In April 2017, after the resignation of Kiatisuk Senamuang, he had an interview with Football Association of Thailand and was expected to become the head coach of the Thailand national football team. Eventually, he was appointed on one-year deal with an option for another one year by Football Association of Thailand on 26 April 2017.

On 5 February 2018, Football Association of Thailand announced the extension of Rajevac's contract to 2020.

He was sacked on 7 January 2019, following a 4–1 defeat against India in the 2019 AFC Asian Cup.

He returned to manage the Ghana national team for a second time in September 2021. He was sacked in January 2022, after the exit of the Black Stars at the delayed AFCON 2021 tournament.

In October 2022, he became the technical director of Muangthong United.

== Honours ==
=== Manager ===
Thailand

- King's Cup: 2017

Individual

- Serbian Coach of the Year: 2010
- African Coach of the Year: 2010
