= Habib Mohamed (footballer, born 1983) =

Ghanaian footballer (born 1983)

Personal information
- Full name: Habib Mullah Muhammad
- Date of birth: 10 December 1983 (age 42)
- Place of birth: Tamale, Ghana
- Height: 1.78 m (5 ft 10 in)
- Position: Left-back

Senior career*
Years	Team	Apps	(Gls)
2004–2007	King Faisal Babes		
2006	→ Molde (loan)	0	(0)
2007	→ Ankaragücü (loan)		
2007	Asante Kotoko		
2008	All Stars		
2008	Accra Great Olympics		
2009–2010	Ashanti Gold		
2010	Smouha	7	(0)
2011–2012	Bechem Chelsea		
2012–2014	Al-Talaba		

International career
2006–2007	Ghana	8	(0)
- * Club domestic league appearances and goals

Habib Mullah Mohamed or Muhammad (born 10 December 1983) is a Ghanaian former professional footballer who played as a left-back.

== Club career ==
Mohamed was born in Tamale. He began his career in 2004 (?). He played for King Faisal Babes in Kumasi, helping the club to play well in the CAF Confederation Cup 2005. He also earned the MVP Award in the quarterfinals. In 2006, Mohamed had trial sessions abroad in Germany and Israel.

After the 2006 World Cup, Mohamed was loaned out to Norwegian club Molde FK, with an option to buy him. He did not play any matches for the club in Tippeligaen, and returned after the 2006 season.

On 25 June 2007, BBC and the Turkish media reported that the 23-year-old has sealed a two-year deal with the Turkish club Ankaragücü after passing a medical test. He was expected to bolster the club's defensive punch next season after sealing the move from local side King Faisal Babes. He was loaned out for six months to Ankaragücü before returning to Ghana in November to Kumasi-based club Asante Kotoko. On 4 January 2008, he moved from Asante Kotoko to All Stars F.C. in a permanent move. He joined to Accra Great Olympics in May and five months later Ashanti Gold. On 19 May 2011, he signed for Globacom Premier League side Bechem Chelsea in Berekum.

== International career ==
Mohamed was called up to the Ghana national team's squad for the 2006 FIFA World Cup. He made two appearances (180 minutes), before he passed after injury.

He lost his place in the national team after the World Cup.

== Honours ==
- Best League Defender in Ghana: 2004
