= Matthew Amoah =

Ghanaian footballer (born 1980)

- Amoah training with Borussia Dortmund in 2006

Personal information
- Full name: Matthew Amoah
- Date of birth: 24 October 1980 (age 46)
- Place of birth: Tema, Greater Accra, Ghana
- Height: 1.77 m (5 ft 10 in)
- Position: Striker

Youth career
- 1996–1998: The Great Ambassadors

Senior career*
| Years | Team | Apps | (Gls) |
| 1998–2005 | Vitesse | 174 | (72) |
| 2000 | → Fortuna Sittard (loan) | 15 | (10) |
| 2005–2007 | Borussia Dortmund | 17 | (0) |
| 2007–2011 | NAC | 105 | (43) |
| 2011–2012 | Mersin İdmanyurdu | 5 | (0) |
| 2012–2013 | Heerenveen | 0 | (0) |
| 2013–2014 | Heracles | 16 | (2) |
| Total | | 332 | (127) |

International career
| 2002–2011 | Ghana | 45 | (12) |
- * Club domestic league appearances and goals

Mathew Amoah (born 24 October 1980) is a Ghanaian former professional footballer who played as a striker. From 2002 to 2011 he played for the Ghana national team at international level, scoring 12 goals in 45 matches.

== Club career ==
=== Vitesse and Fortuna ===
Born in Tema, Amoah moved to the Netherlands at the age of 16 in 1996, where he linked with Vitesse Arnhem, spending eight seasons at the club. His early departure from his homeland has led to an almost anonymous profile there because he never played any top-level club football in Ghana, although in Amoah's home town of Tema his achievements in Europe have not gone unnoticed. With three brothers, Amoah learned his craft on the streets of the Ghanaian town and at the age of 15, he was spotted by scouts from the Dutch club while playing in an international youth tournament for his club Great Ambassadors.

After Amoah moved to Vitesse, he did not play regularly. So in order to get regular playing action, Amoah needed a loan spell at Fortuna Sittard to find his feet in Dutch football before going back at Arnhem where coach Ronald Koeman gave him a chance. And the move paid off as the club's supporters named him their best player after the 2002–03 season, in which he scored 15 goals for the club and also competed in European club competition. Amoah trained at Vitesse where he developed into a good striker. It was his performances at Vitesse which gained him a call up to the Ghana national team. At Vitesse, he scored 62 goals in 174 appearances for the club.

=== Borussia Dortmund ===
Amoah signed with Borussia Dortmund in December 2005, during the winter transfer window, rejoining coach Bert van Marwijk, who managed him during the 1999–2000 season at another Dutch side, Fortuna Sittard. Amoah signed a two-year contract, but could only manage seventeen first-team appearances (going scoreless in the process) in one-and-a-half seasons. "There was a number of options but Amoah was the one the manager wanted", Hans-Joachim Watzke, Dortmund's finance director, told the Westfälische Rundschau at the time.

=== NAC Breda ===
The 26-year-old Amoah signed a three-year deal with the Eredivisie's NAC Breda on 3 July 2007, after a medical. The former Vitesse forward returned to the Netherlands after a lack of first-team opportunities at Dortmund. "We have been working on this deal for months", NAC technical director Earnie Stewart said. "First it looked like it was impossible for the player to sign, but this week negotiations went quicker."Amoah was instrumental in the attack of NAC Breda since his arrival in July 2007. He scored more than eight goals in every season at the club. He scored 11 goals in his first season, 12 in his second season and then nine in his third season. He was the top scorer of NAC Breda and was loved by the supporters for his spectacular goals which helped the club a lot. At the end of his five-year stay with the club played 105 league matches and scored 43 goals.

=== Mersin İdmanyurdu ===
Amoah signed a two-year contract with Mersin İdmanyurdu, the newly promoted Turkish club. He only played five matches for the team and left Turkey after one year.

=== SC Heerenveen ===
In June 2012, Amoah signed with Eredivisie side SC Heerenveen. However, after one season in which he played no single match for the club, he was released in June 2013.

== International career ==
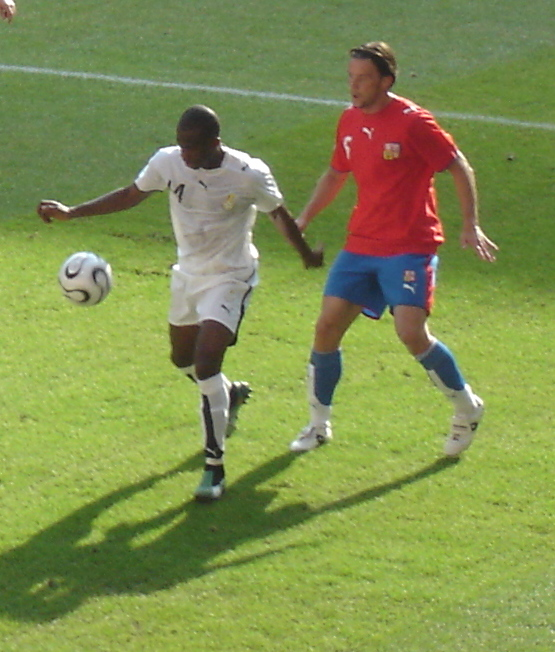
Matthew Amoah during Czech Republic vrs Ghana at 2006 World Cup

Ghana first selected Amoah ahead of the 2002 CAF Africa Cup of Nations and it was in the tournament in Mali where he made his debut. But after the Black Stars were eliminated in the quarter- finals, Amoah only ever received one more call-up before the appointment of coach Ratomir Dujkovic in December 2004. The Serb brought Amoah back for his first game in charge, and Amoah has been in the squad ever since.

An international since 2002 he made his debut on 21 January 2002, Segou in a Ghana, Morocco encounter at the Africa Cup of Nations: 2002, Amoah was an instrumental figure in Ghana's first qualification for the World Cup, scoring three goals in three consecutive and important qualifying matches. Matthew Amoah finished as Ghana's leading scorer in the 2010 FIFA World Cup qualifiers, his five strikes proving pivotal in the Black Stars' march to a second successive tournament. His tally added to the three goals he scored in the 2006 qualifiers that also made a major contribution to Ghana's march to their first-ever FIFA World Cup finals appearance. He also played in their World cup debut even though he did not score in any of the matches he played, his ability, runs and passes helped the team to the group of 16.

In 2010, he helped his nation qualify for another world cup. He played in two matches, which he was brought in as a substitute. He is a member of the Ghanaian Golden Era of footballers including Fulham right back John Paintsil and Chelsea versatile midfielder Michael Essien and former captain Stephen Appiah who formerly played for Italian Club Cesena, Fenerbahçe SK and Juventus. Amoah has scored 13 times in 40 appearances for Ghana.

== Career statistics ==
=== Club ===
Appearances and goals by club, season and competition
| Season | Club | League | | |
| Season | Club | Division | Apps | Goals |
|---|---|---|---|---|
| Vitesse | 1998–99 | Eredivisie | 17 | 3 |
| Vitesse | 1999–00 | Eredivisie | 7 | 1 |
| Vitesse | 2000–01 | Eredivisie | 33 | 11 |
| Vitesse | 2001–02 | Eredivisie | 24 | 6 |
| Vitesse | 2002–03 | Eredivisie | 30 | 15 |
| Vitesse | 2003–04 | Eredivisie | 11 | 4 |
| Vitesse | 2004–05 | Eredivisie | 34 | 13 |
| Vitesse | 2005–06 | Eredivisie | 18 | 9 |
| Vitesse | Total | | 174 | 72 |
| Fortuna Sittard | 1999–00 | Eredivisie | 15 | 10 |
| Borussia Dortmund | 2005–06 | Bundesliga | 8 | 0 |
| Borussia Dortmund | 2006–07 | Bundesliga | 9 | 0 |
| Borussia Dortmund | Total | | 17 | 0 |
| NAC Breda | 2007–08 | Eredivisie | 25 | 11 |
| NAC Breda | 2008–09 | Eredivisie | 22 | 12 |
| NAC Breda | 2009–10 | Eredivisie | 26 | 9 |
| NAC Breda | 2010–11 | Eredivisie | 28 | 10 |
| NAC Breda | 2011–12 | Eredivisie | 4 | 1 |
| NAC Breda | Total | | 105 | 43 |
| Mersin Idmanyurdu | 2011–12 | Süper Lig | 5 | 0 |
| SC Heerenveen | 2012–13 | Eredivisie | 0 | 0 |
| Heracles Almelo | 2013–14 | Eredivisie | 16 | 2 |
| Career total | | | 332 | 127 |

=== International ===
Appearances and goals by national team and year
| National team | Year | Apps | Goals |
|---|---|---|---|
| Ghana | 2002 | 3 | 0 |
| Ghana | 2003 | 1 | 0 |
| Ghana | 2004 | 0 | 0 |
| Ghana | 2005 | 8 | 3 |
| Ghana | 2006 | 10 | 3 |
| Ghana | 2007 | 4 | 0 |
| Ghana | 2008 | 2 | 1 |
| Ghana | 2009 | 8 | 5 |
| Ghana | 2010 | 9 | 0 |
| Ghana | Total | 45 | 12 |

Scores and results list Ghana's goal tally first, score column indicates score after each Amoah goal.

List of international goals scored by Matthew Amoah
| No. | Date | Venue | Opponent | Score | Result | Competition | Ref. |
|---|---|---|---|---|---|---|---|
| 1 | 23 March 2005 | Moi International Sports Centre, Kasarani, Kenya | Kenya | 2–2 | 2–2 | Friendly | |
| 2 | 5 June 2005 | Baba Yara Stadium, Kumasi, Ghana | Burkina Faso | 2–1 | 2–1 | 2006 FIFA World Cup qualification | |
| 3 | 4 September 2005 | Baba Yara Stadium, Kumasi, Ghana | Uganda | 2–0 | 2–0 | 2006 FIFA World Cup qualification | |
| 4 | 27 January 2006 | Port Said Stadium, Port Said, Egypt | Senegal | 1–0 | 1–0 | 2006 African Cup of Nations | |
| 5 | 26 May 2006 | Ruhrstadion, Bochum, Germany | Turkey | 1–1 | 1–1 | Friendly | |
| 6 | 29 May 2006 | King Power Stadium, Leicester, England | Jamaica | 4–1 | 4–1 | Friendly | |
| 7 | 11 October 2008 | Sekondi-Takoradi Stadium, Sekondi-Takoradi, Ghana | Lesotho | 3–0 | 3–0 | 2010 FIFA World Cup qualification | |
| 8 | 7 June 2009 | Stade du 26 Mars, Bamako, Mali | Mali | 2–0 | 2–0 | 2010 FIFA World Cup qualification | |
| 9 | 20 June 2009 | Al-Merrikh Stadium, Omdurman, Sudan | Sudan | 1–0 | 2–0 | 2010 FIFA World Cup qualification | |
| 10 | 20 June 2009 | Al-Merrikh Stadium, Omdurman, Sudan | Sudan | 2–0 | 2–0 | 2010 FIFA World Cup qualification | |
| 11 | 9 September 2009 | Stadion Galgenwaard, Utrecht, Netherlands | Japan | 3–1 | 3–4 | Friendly | |
| 12 | 15 November 2009 | Baba Yara Stadium, Kumasi, Ghana | Mali | 1–1 | 2–2 | 2010 FIFA World Cup qualification | |

== Honours ==
Ghana

- Africa Cup of Nations silver medal: 2010
