= 2013 Africa Cup of Nations Group A =

Football tournament group stage

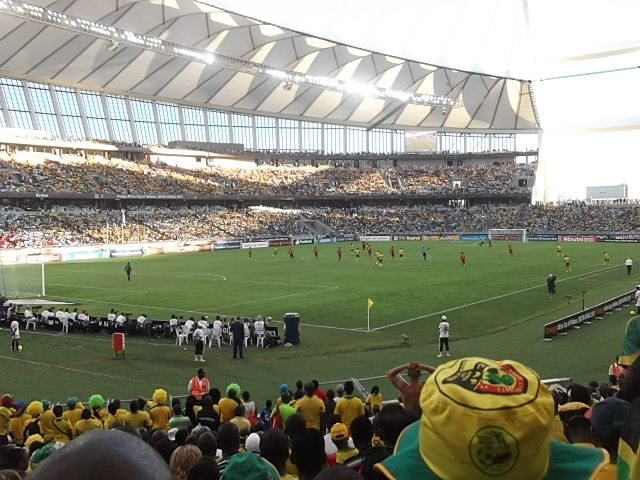
The South African and Angolan teams during match group stage.

Group A of the 2013 Africa Cup of Nations ran from 19 January until 27 January. It consisted of South Africa (hosts), Angola, Morocco and Cape Verde. The matches were held in the South African cities of Johannesburg, Durban and Port Elizabeth.

== Standings ==
Pos	Team	Pld	W	D	L	GF	GA	GD	Pts	Qualification
1	South Africa (H)	3	1	2	0	4	2	+2	5	Advance to knockout stage
2	Cape Verde	3	1	2	0	3	2	+1	5	Advance to knockout stage
3	Morocco	3	0	3	0	3	3	0	3	
4	Angola	3	0	1	2	1	4	−3	1	

Source: CAF
(H) Hosts

All times South African Standard Time (UTC+2)

== Matches ==
=== South Africa vs Cape Verde ===
19 January 2013
18:00

South Africa	0–0	Cape Verde
	Report

Soccer City, Johannesburg
Attendance: 50,000
Referee: Djamel Haimoudi (Algeria)

South Africa	Cape Verde

GK	16	Itumeleng Khune
RB	5	Anele Ngcongca	(yellow card) 44'
CB	14	Bongani Khumalo (c)
CB	21	Siyabonga Sangweni
LB	11	Thabo Matlaba
RM	18	Thuso Phala
CM	13	Kagisho Dikgacoi		(substituted off) 46'
CM	12	Reneilwe Letsholonyane
LM	8	Siphiwe Tshabalala		(substituted off) 60'
CF	7	Lehlohonolo Majoro		(substituted off) 68'
CF	17	Bernard Parker
Substitutions:
MF	6	Lerato Chabangu		(substituted on) 46'
MF	10	Thulani Serero		(substituted on) 60'
FW	9	Katlego Mphela		(substituted on) 68'
Manager:
Gordon Igesund

GK	1	Vozinha
RB	23	Carlitos
CB	3	Fernando Varela
CB	6	Nando (c)
LB	18	Nivaldo
RM	7	Platini	(yellow card) 60'	(substituted off) 63'
CM	15	Marco Soares
CM	5	Babanco
LM	8	Toni Varela
CF	10	Héldon Ramos		(substituted off) 76'
CF	20	Ryan Mendes		(substituted off) 85'
Substitutions:
FW	11	Julio Tavares		(substituted on) 63'
MF	22	David Silva		(substituted on) 76'
MF	17	Ronny		(substituted on) 85'
Manager:
Lúcio Antunes

Man of the Match:
Thuso Phala (South Africa)

Assistant referees:
Felicien Kabanda (Rwanda)
Songuifolo Yeo (Ivory Coast)
Fourth official:
Noumandiez Doué (Ivory Coast)

=== Angola vs Morocco ===
19 January 2013
21:00

Angola	0–0	Morocco
	Report

Soccer City, Johannesburg
Attendance: 25,000
Referee: Badara Diatta (Senegal)

Angola	Morocco

GK	1	Lamá
RB	3	Lunguinha		(substituted off) 78'
CB	4	Dani Massunguna
CB	13	Bastos
LB	15	Miguel
RM	18	Geraldo		(substituted off) 82'
CM	6	Dedé
CM	16	Pirolito
LM	20	Mingo Bile		(substituted off) 46'
CF	9	Manucho (c)	(yellow card) 34'
CF	17	Mateus Galiano
Substitutions:
FW	23	Guilherme		(substituted on) 46'
DF	2	Marco Airosa		(substituted on) 78'
MF	11	Gilberto		(substituted on) 82'
Manager:
(Uruguay) Gustavo Ferrín

GK	1	Nadir Lamyaghri (c)
RB	2	Abderrahim Achchakir
CB	17	Issam El Adoua
CB	5	Mehdi Benatia	(yellow card) 56'
LB	15	Abdelhamid El Kaoutari
RM	21	Nordin Amrabat
CM	6	Adil Hermach
CM	8	Karim El Ahmadi		(substituted off) 82'
LM	11	Oussama Assaidi
CF	14	Mounir El Hamdaoui		(substituted off) 71'
CF	7	Abdelaziz Barrada		(substituted off) 63'
Substitutions:
MF	10	Younès Belhanda	(yellow card) 77'	(substituted on) 63'
FW	9	Youssef El-Arabi		(substituted on) 71'
MF	18	Chahir Belghazouani		(substituted on) 82'
Manager:
Rachid Taoussi

Man of the Match:
Geraldo (Angola)

Assistant referees:
Djibril Camara (Senegal)
El Hadji Samba (Senegal)
Fourth official:
Koman Coulibaly (Mali)

=== South Africa vs Angola ===
23 January 2013
17:00

South Africa	2–0	Angola
Sangweni 30'; Majoro 62'	Report

Moses Mabhida Stadium, Durban
Attendance: 40,000
Referee: Koman Coulibaly (Mali)

South Africa	Angola

GK	16	Itumeleng Khune
RB	5	Anele Ngcongca
CB	21	Siyabonga Sangweni
CB	14	Bongani Khumalo (c)
LB	3	Tsepo Masilela
DM	15	Dean Furman
RM	18	Thuso Phala
CM	19	May Mahlangu	(substituted off) 46'
LM	17	Bernard Parker
CF	23	Tokelo Rantie	(substituted off) 58'
CF	9	Katlego Mphela	(substituted off) 78'
Substitutions:
MF	12	Reneilwe Letsholonyane	(substituted on) 46'
FW	7	Lehlohonolo Majoro	(substituted on) 58'
MF	20	Oupa Manyisa	(substituted on) 78'
Manager:
Gordon Igesund

GK	1	Lamá
RB	3	Lunguinha
CB	13	Bastos
CB	4	Dani Massunguna	(yellow card) 50'
LB	15	Miguel
CM	16	Pirolito
CM	6	Dedé		(substituted off) 65'
RW	17	Mateus Galiano
LW	18	Geraldo		(substituted off) 46'
SS	23	Guilherme		(substituted off) 85'
CF	9	Manucho (c)
Substitutions:
FW	7	Djalma		(substituted on) 46'
MF	11	Gilberto		(substituted on) 65'
DF	14	Amaro		(substituted on) 85'
Manager:
(Uruguay) Gustavo Ferrín

Man of the Match:
Dean Furman (South Africa)

Assistant referees:
Balla Diarra (Mali)
Yanoussa Moussa (Cameroon)
Fourth official:
Ali Lemghaifry (Mauritania)

=== Morocco vs Cape Verde ===
23 January 2013
20:00

Morocco	1–1	Cape Verde
El-Arabi 78'	Report	Platini 35'

Moses Mabhida Stadium, Durban
Attendance: 25,000
Referee: Janny Sikazwe (Zambia)

Morocco	Cape Verde

GK	1	Nadir Lamyaghri (c)
RB	2	Abderrahim Achchakir	(yellow card) 21'
CB	5	Mehdi Benatia
CB	17	Issam El Adoua
LB	3	Zakarya Bergdich
CM	8	Karim El Ahmadi
CM	7	Abdelaziz Barrada	(yellow card) 65'
RW	21	Nordin Amrabat		(substituted off) 46'
AM	10	Younès Belhanda	(yellow card) 62'	(substituted off) 65'
LW	11	Oussama Assaidi		(substituted off) 54'
CF	14	Mounir El Hamdaoui
Substitutions:
FW	9	Youssef El-Arabi	(yellow card) 70'	(substituted on) 46'
MF	18	Chahir Belghazouani		(substituted on) 54'
MF	19	Kamel Chafni		(substituted on) 65'
Manager:
Rachid Taoussi

GK	1	Vozinha
RB	14	Gégé
CB	3	Fernando Varela
CB	6	Nando (c)	(yellow card) 67'
LB	18	Nivaldo
DM	8	Toni Varela
RM	15	Marco Soares
LM	5	Babanco
AM	7	Platini		(substituted off) 71'
CF	11	Julio Tavares		(substituted off) 90'
CF	20	Ryan Mendes	(yellow card) 38'	(substituted off) 75'
Substitutions:
MF	17	Ronny		(substituted on) 71'
MF	10	Héldon Ramos		(substituted on) 75'
DF	4	Guy Ramos		(substituted on) 90'
Manager:
Lúcio Antunes

Man of the Match:
Ryan Mendes (Cape Verde)

Assistant referees:
Malik Alidu Salifu (Ghana)
David Laryea (Ghana)
Fourth official:
Slim Jedidi (Tunisia)

=== Morocco vs South Africa ===
27 January 2013
19:00

Morocco	2–2	South Africa
El Adoua 10'; Hafidi 82'	Report	Mahlangu 71'; Sangweni 86'

Moses Mabhida Stadium, Durban
Attendance: 45,000
Referee: Bakary Gassama (Gambia)

Morocco	South Africa

GK	1	Nadir Lamyaghri (c)
RB	2	Abderrahim Achchakir
CB	5	Mehdi Benatia
CB	4	Ahmed Kantari
LB	15	Abdelhamid El Kaoutari
DM	17	Issam El Adoua
CM	19	Kamel Chafni	(yellow card) 66'
AM	7	Abdelaziz Barrada		(substituted off) 75'
RW	13	Youssef Kaddioui		(substituted off) 53'
LW	18	Chahir Belghazouani	(yellow card) 28'	(substituted off) 63'
CF	9	Youssef El-Arabi
Substitutions:
MF	23	Abdelilah Hafidi	(yellow card) 57'	(substituted on) 53'
MF	3	Zakaria Bergdich		(substituted on) 63'
FW	14	Mounir El Hamdaoui		(substituted on) 75'
Manager:
Rachid Taoussi

GK	16	Itumeleng Khune
RB	5	Anele Ngcongca	(yellow card) 34'
CB	14	Bongani Khumalo (c)
CB	21	Siyabonga Sangweni
LB	3	Tsepo Masilela
CM	15	Dean Furman
CM	19	May Mahlangu		(substituted off) 90+2'
RW	18	Thuso Phala
LW	17	Bernard Parker	(yellow card) 74'	(substituted off) 76'
SS	23	Tokelo Rantie
CF	9	Katlego Mphela		(substituted off) 51'
Substitutions:
FW	10	Thulani Serero		(substituted on) 51'
MF	12	Reneilwe Letsholonyane		(substituted on) 76'
MF	13	Kagisho Dikgacoi		(substituted on) 90+2'
Manager:
Gordon Igesund

Man of the Match:
Itumeleng Khune (South Africa)

Assistant referees:
Yéo Songuifolo (Ivory Coast)
Jean-Claude Birumushahu (Burundi)
Fourth official:
Mohamed Benouza (Algeria)

=== Cape Verde vs Angola ===
27 January 2013
19:00

Cape Verde	2–1	Angola
F. Varela 81'; Héldon 90+1'	Report	Nando 33' (o.g.)

Nelson Mandela Bay Stadium, Port Elizabeth
Attendance: 20,000
Referee: Slim Jedidi (Tunisia)

Cape Verde	Angola

GK	1	Vozinha
RB	14	Gégé	(yellow card) 84'	(substituted off) 87'
CB	3	Fernando Varela	(yellow card) 83'
CB	6	Nando (c)
LB	23	Carlitos
DM	8	Toni Varela		(substituted off) 46'
RM	15	Marco Soares
LM	5	Babanco
AM	7	Platini		(substituted off) 46'
CF	11	Julio Tavares
CF	20	Ryan Mendes
Substitutions:
FW	10	Héldon Ramos	(yellow card) 58'	(substituted on) 46'
FW	21	Djaniny		(substituted on) 46'
FW	9	Rambé		(substituted on) 87'
Manager:
Lúcio Antunes

GK	1	Lamá
RB	2	Marco Airosa
CB	13	Bastos
CB	4	Dani Massunguna
LB	14	Amaro
CM	8	Manucho Diniz
CM	16	Pirolito	(yellow card) 78'	(substituted off) 86'
RW	17	Mateus Galiano		(substituted off) 63'
AM	11	Gilberto		(substituted off) 80'
LW	7	Djalma
CF	9	Manucho (c)
Substitutions:
MF	6	Dedé		(substituted on) 63'
MF	18	Geraldo		(substituted on) 80'
FW	19	Yano		(substituted on) 86'
Manager:
(Uruguay) Gustavo Ferrín

Man of the Match:
Héldon Ramos (Cape Verde)

Assistant referees:
Béchir Hassani (Tunisia)
Peter Edibe (Nigeria)
Fourth official:
Janny Sikazwe (Zambia)
