= Héldon Ramos =

Cape Verdean footballer (born 1988)

Héldon
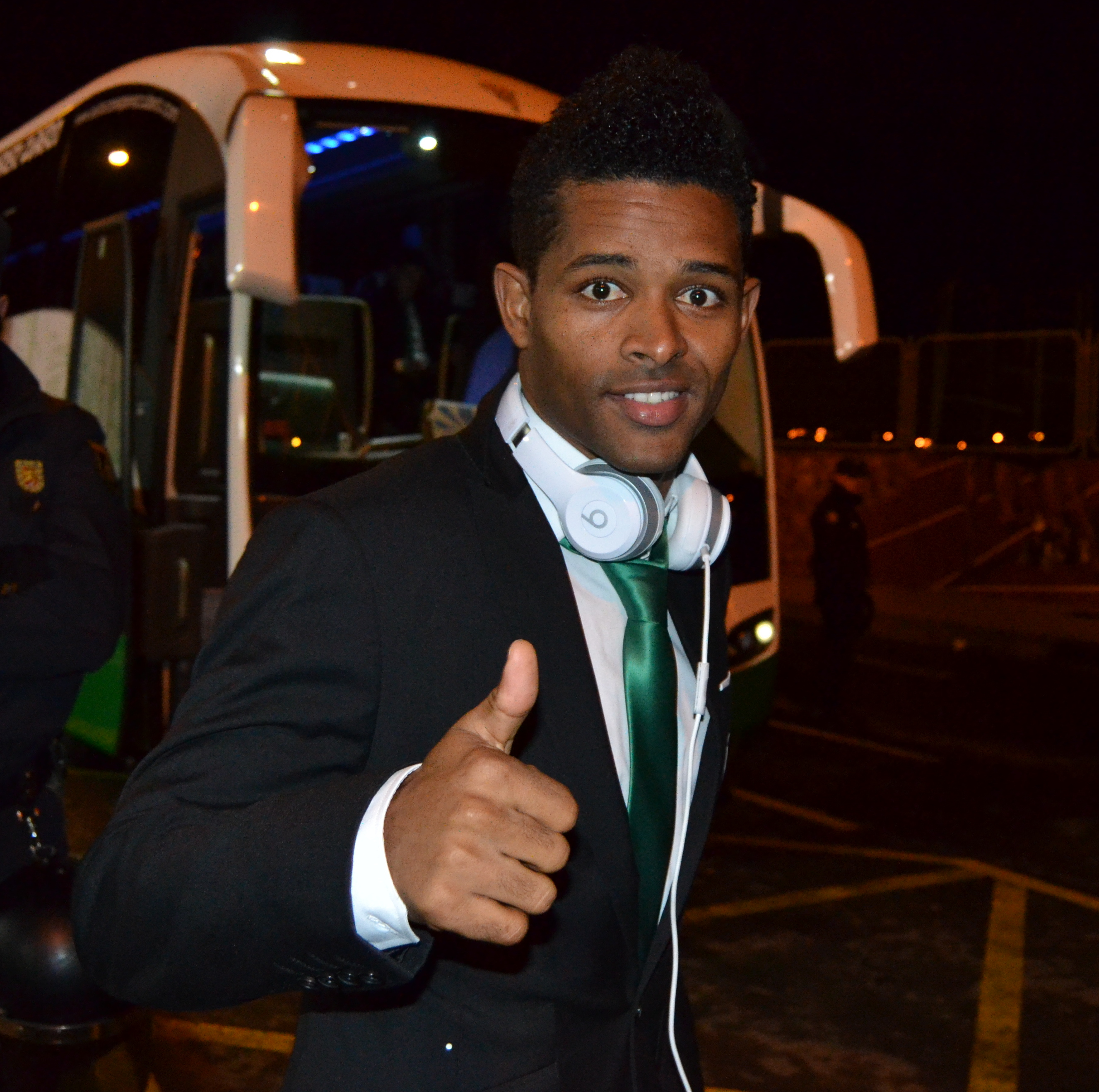
- Héldon in 2015

Personal information
- Full name: Héldon Augusto Almeida Ramos
- Date of birth: 14 November 1988 (age 37)
- Place of birth: Sal, Cape Verde
- Height: 1.74 m (5 ft 8 1/2 in)
- Position: Attacking midfielder

Youth career
- 2005–2006: Batuque
- 2006–2007: Académica

Senior career*
Years	Team	Apps	(Gls)
2007–2008	Caniçal	21	(0)
2008–2010	Fátima	47	(11)
2010–2014	Marítimo	82	(15)
2010–2011	Marítimo B	9	(4)
2014–2018	Sporting CP	12	(1)
2015	→ Córdoba (loan)	14	(0)
2015–2017	→ Rio Ave (loan)	51	(4)
2017–2018	→ Vitória Guimarães (loan)	29	(5)
2018–2020	Al Taawoun	52	(17)
2020–2021	Shabab Al Ahli	10	(0)
2021–2022	Al-Orobah	15	(2)
Total		342	(59)

International career
2008–2019	Cape Verde	52	(15)
- * Club domestic league appearances and goals

Héldon Augusto Almeida Ramos (born 14 November 1988), known simply as Héldon and sometimes nicknamed Nhuck (pronounced [ɲuk]), is a Cape Verdean former professional footballer who played as an attacking midfielder.

He spent most of his career in Portugal, primarily in representation of Marítimo, and joined Sporting CP in 2014. In the Primeira Liga, he also appeared for Rio Ave and Vitória de Guimarães, for a total of 174 games and 25 goals.

A full international since 2008, Héldon played for Cape Verde at two Africa Cup of Nations tournaments.

== Club career ==
=== Early career and Marítimo ===
Born in Sal, Héldon made his professional debut in 2007 with C.F. Caniçal, in the Portuguese third division. He moved to C.D. Fátima ahead of the 2008–09 season, helping them to win promotion to the Segunda Liga.

In August 2010, Héldon signed with C.S. Marítimo of Primeira Liga. On 26 November 2011, he scored his second official goal for the Madeira club – first in the league – a last-minute penalty in a derby against C.D. Nacional (2–2 away draw, his team played the entire second half with ten players).

On 8 December 2013, against the same opponent but in a home fixture, Héldon scored twice for the same result, as Nacional in turn played nearly 30 minutes with one man less.

=== Sporting CP ===
On 31 January 2014, Héldon joined fellow league side Sporting CP in a €1.5 million deal. He made his debut on 11 February, featuring the full 90 minutes in a 2–0 Lisbon derby loss at S.L. Benfica. He scored his tenth goal of the season and first for his new team on 12 April, when he came on as a substitute for Diego Capel with two minutes remaining and confirmed a 2–0 win over Gil Vicente F.C. at the Estádio José Alvalade.

Héldon signed with Córdoba CF on 28 January 2015, on loan until the end of the campaign. He made his La Liga debut three days later, starting and being booked in a 1–0 away defeat against RC Celta de Vigo. He failed to find the net during his spell with the Andalusians, who suffered relegation; he was also the first player in their 60-year history to lose his first five games.

On 8 August 2015, Héldon was loaned to Rio Ave F.C. for the upcoming top-flight season. He attained his first goals for the Vila do Conde-based side on 19 September, a first-half brace in a 3–0 victory at F.C. Paços de Ferreira.

Héldon spent the following two years still on loan, at Rio Ave and Vitória de Guimarães. He scored his first goal for the latter on 24 September 2017, netting in the last minutes of a 2–1 home win against former club Marítimo.

=== Middle East ===
On 2 July 2018, Héldon joined Al Taawoun FC on a two-year contract. He scored 11 competitive goals in his debut campaign in the Saudi Professional League, also winning the King's Cup.

Héldon agreed to a one-year deal at Shabab Al Ahli Club of the UAE Pro League on 26 September 2020. The following 12 July he moved back to Saudi Arabia to join Al-Orobah FC of the First Division League on a two-year contract, leaving on 1 February 2022 by mutual consent.

== International career ==
Héldon made his international debut for Cape Verde on 11 October 2008, replacing Ronny Souto during half-time of a 1–3 away loss against Tanzania for the 2010 FIFA World Cup qualifiers. He scored his first goal in his next game, opening a 2–0 friendly win in Malta on 4 September 2009. He was the country's top scorer during the 2012 Africa Cup of Nations qualifying campaign, recording two goals in a 4–2 victory over Liberia on 26 March 2011.

Héldon was named to the squad that participated in the 2013 Africa Cup of Nations held in South Africa, and featured in every game as the nation reached the quarter-finals. In their final group against Angola, he came on as a 46th-minute substitute and scored a last-minute winner, making it 2–1 and causing his team to advance. He was also selected for the 2015 Africa Cup of Nations, where he won and converted a penalty to equalise in a 1–1 draw against Tunisia in the team's opening game.

Héldon was also a gold medallist with the under-20 team at the 2009 Lusofonia Games in Portugal. He scored five goals in the tournament, including a hat-trick in a 7–1 win over India.

== Career statistics ==
=== Club ===
As of match played 12 May 2018

Appearances and goals by club, season and competition
Club	Season	League			National Cup		League Cup		Europe		Total	
Club	Season	Division	Apps	Goals	Apps	Goals	Apps	Goals	Apps	Goals	Apps	Goals
Caniçal	2007–08	Segunda Divisão	21	0	0	0	—		—		21	0
Fátima	2008–09	Segunda Divisão	30	10	3	1	—		—		33	11
Fátima	2009–10	Liga de Honra	17	1	2	2	3	1	—		22	4
Fátima	Total		47	11	5	3	3	1	—		55	15
Marítimo	2010–11	Primeira Liga	15	0	1	1	3	0	0	0	19	1
Marítimo	2011–12	Primeira Liga	29	4	3	0	4	0	—		36	4
Marítimo	2012–13	Primeira Liga	22	2	0	0	2	1	9 (Note: Appearances in UEFA Europa League)	2	33	5
Marítimo	2013–14	Primeira Liga	16	9	2	2	2	0	—		20	11
Marítimo	Total		82	15	6	3	11	1	9	2	108	21
Marítimo B	2010–11	Segunda Divisão	9	4	—		—		—		9	4
Sporting CP	2013–14	Primeira Liga	10	1	0	0	0	0	—		10	1
Sporting CP	2014–15	Primeira Liga	2	0	1	0	1	1	0	0	4	1
Sporting CP	Total		12	1	1	0	1	1	0	0	14	2
Córdoba (loan)	2014–15	La Liga	14	0	0	0	—		—		14	0
Rio Ave (loan)	2015–16	Primeira Liga	24	4	3	1	0	0	—		27	5
Rio Ave (loan)	2016–17	Primeira Liga	27	0	1	1	3	1	2	0	33	2
Rio Ave (loan)	Total		51	4	4	2	3	1	2	0	60	7
Vitória Guimarães (loan)	2017–18	Primeira Liga	29	5	2	1	0	0	6	0	37	6
Career total			265	40	17	8	18	4	17	2	317	54

=== International ===
Scores and results list Cape Verde's goal tally first, score column indicates score after each Héldon goal.

List of international goals scored by Héldon Ramos
No.	Date	Venue	Opponent	Score	Result	Competition
1	3 September 2009	National Stadium, Ta' Qali, Malta	Malta	1–0	2–0	Friendly
2	9 February 2011	Municipal, Óbidos, Portugal	Burkina Faso	1–0	1–0	Friendly
3	26 March 2011	Estádio da Várzea, Praia, Cape Verde	Liberia	1–0	4–2	2012 Africa Cup of Nations qualification
4	26 March 2011	Estádio da Várzea, Praia, Cape Verde	Liberia	3–1	4–2	2012 Africa Cup of Nations qualification
5	14 October 2012	Ahmadou Ahidjo, Yaoundé, Cameroon	Cameroon	1–0	1–2	2013 Africa Cup of Nations qualification
6	27 January 2013	Nelson Mandela Bay, Port Elizabeth, South Africa	Angola	2–1	2–1	2013 Africa Cup of Nations
7	15 June 2013	Estádio da Várzea, Praia, Cape Verde	Sierra Leone	1–0	1–0	2014 World Cup qualification
8	14 August 2013	Estádio do Real SC, Queluz, Portugal	Gabon	1–0	1–1	Friendly
9	15 October 2014	Estádio Nacional, Praia, Cape Verde	Mozambique	1–0	1–0	2015 Africa Cup of Nations qualification
10	14 November 2014	Estádio Nacional, Praia, Cape Verde	Niger	2–1	3–1	2015 Africa Cup of Nations qualification
11	7 January 2015	Estádio do Bravo, Seixal, Portugal	Equatorial Guinea	1–0	1–1	Friendly
12	10 January 2015	Léopold Sédar Senghor, Dakar, Senegal	Congo	2–2	3–2	Friendly
13	18 January 2015	Estadio de Ebibeyin, Ebibeyin, Equatorial Guinea	Tunisia	1–1	1–1	2015 Africa Cup of Nations
14	17 November 2015	Estádio Nacional, Praia, Cape Verde	Kenya	1–0	2–0	2018 World Cup qualification
15	17 November 2015	Estádio Nacional, Praia, Cape Verde	Kenya	2–0	2–0	2018 World Cup qualification

== Honours ==
Al Taawoun

- King's Cup: 2019

Shabab Al Ahli

- UAE League Cup: 2020–21
