= FNB Stadium =

Stadium in Johannesburg, South Africa

First National Bank Stadium
- Soccer City, The Calabash
- FNB Stadium
- Interactive map of First National Bank Stadium
- Full name: FNB Stadium
- Former names: Soccer City (2010)
- Address: Soccer City Ave; Nasrec; 2147
- Location: Johannesburg, South Africa
- Coordinates: 26°14′05″S 27°58′56″E
- Elevation: 1,753 m (5,751 ft)
- Owner: City of Johannesburg
- Operator: Stadium Management South Africa
- Capacity: 94,736
- Executive suites: 195
- Surface: Grass
- Record attendance: 94,807 (Kaizer Chiefs vs Orlando Pirates, 1 August 2015)
- Field size: 105 × 68 m

Construction
- Groundbreaking: 1986
- Built: 1987–1989
- Opened: 7 October 1989; 37 years ago
- Renovated: 2007–2009
- Expanded: 2009
- Cost: ZAR 3.3 billion (US$440 million)
- Architects: Boogertman & Partners, HOK Sport (now Populous)
- Builder: Grinaker-LTA/ BAM International
- Structural engineer: Schlaich Bergermann & Partner

Tenants
- Kaizer Chiefs; South Africa national football team South Africa national rugby union team

Website
- www.stadiummanagement.co.za/stadiums/fnb/

The First National Bank (FNB) Stadium, also known as Soccer City or the Calabash, is a football and rugby union stadium located in Nasrec, bordering the Soweto area of Johannesburg, South Africa. The site is managed by Stadium Management South Africa (SMSA) and is home of Kaizer Chiefs F.C. in the South African Premiership as well as the venue for key fixtures for the South Africa national football team.

It is located next to the South African Football Association headquarters (SAFA House) where both the FIFA offices and the Local Organising Committee for the 2010 FIFA World Cup are housed. Designed as the main association football stadium for the 2010 World Cup, the FNB Stadium became the largest stadium in Africa with a capacity of 94,736. However, its maximum capacity during the 2010 FIFA World Cup was 84,490 due to reserved seating for the press and VIPs. The stadium is also known by its nickname "The Calabash" due to its resemblance to the African pot or gourd.

It was the site of Nelson Mandela's first speech in Johannesburg after his release from prison in 1990, and served as the venue for a memorial service to him on 10 December 2013. It was also the site of the funeral of anti-apartheid activists Chris Hani (on 19 April 1993) and Oliver Tambo (on 2 May 1993). It was also the venue for the 2010 FIFA World Cup Final, which was played by the Netherlands and Spain. The World Cup closing ceremony on the day of the final saw the final public appearance of Mandela.

== Naming history ==
The stadium has been officially known as FNB Stadium since it was opened on 7 October 1989. This was due to a naming rights deal with First National Bank. During the 2010 FIFA World Cup, as well as in the month before the tournament, the stadium was referred to as Soccer City. This was done as FIFA does not allow stadiums to be referred to by sponsored names during FIFA-sanctioned tournaments. The stadium's current name is FNB Stadium.

== Construction ==
Construction work in progress at Soccer City in May 2008

Built in 1987, the stadium underwent a major upgrade for the 2010 FIFA World Cup, with a new design inspired by the shape of an African pot, the calabash. The South African main contractor GLTA, part of the Aveng Group in a joint venture with the Dutch company BAM who had a 25% stake, constructed the upgrade, which was designed by HOK Sport (now known as Populous) and Boogertman + Partners. The upgrade included: an extended upper tier around the stadium to increase the capacity to 88,958, an additional two executive suites, an encircling roof, new changing room facilities and new floodlights. The number of suites in the stadium was increased to 195. Grinaker-LTA and BAM international won the R1.5 billion tender to upgrade the stadium. The construction was completed on Wednesday, 21 October 2009 and was marked by a huge celebration at the stadium.

Construction work in progress at Soccer City in December 2008

== Stadium design ==
Exterior of FNB stadium

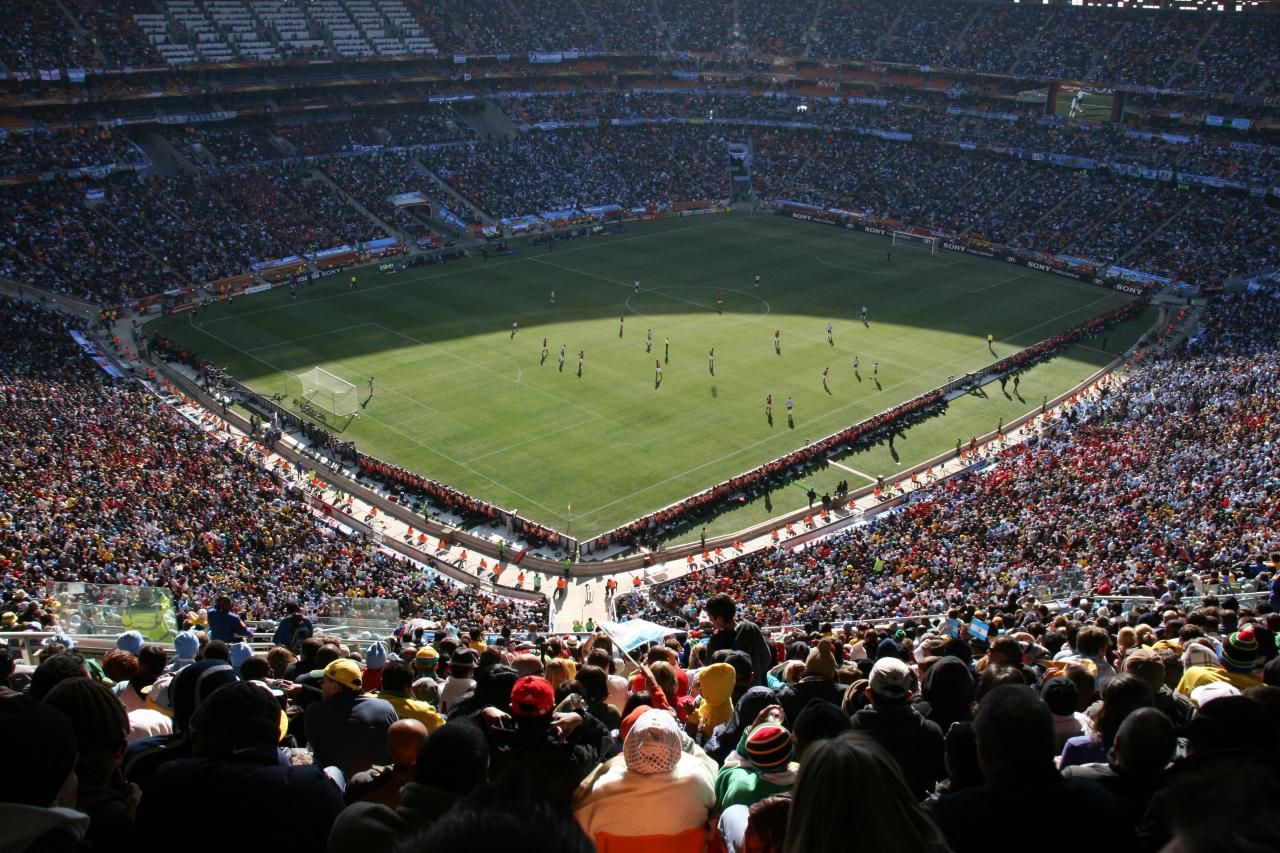
Inside the FNB stadium

The outside of the stadium is designed to have the appearance of an African pot; the cladding on the outside is a mosaic of fire and earthen colours with a ring of lights running around the bottom of the structure, simulating fire underneath the pot. No spectator is seated more than 100 metres (330 ft) from the field, and there are no restricted views in the stadium.

The stands in the FNB Stadium are articulated by ten black vertical lines; nine are aligned geographically with the nine other stadiums involved in the 2010 World Cup. Because nine is considered to be an unlucky number in South African traditional culture, a tenth line was added. This 10th line is aimed at Berlin's Olympic Stadium, which hosted the previous World Cup final in 2006. This represents the road to the final and it is hoped that after the World Cup, each goal scored at the stadium will be placed in pre-cast concrete panels on a podium so that the full history of the tournament's scores can be seen for years to come.

== Before the upgrade ==
The newly reconstructed stadium retains part of the original structure's west upper tier, although this and the entire lower tier were rebuilt to improve sightlines. The lower tier was completely reconstructed and divided into two segments which enabled the creation of a new lower concourse (the lower embankment concourse) linked to the existing ground level concourse.

== Major tournaments ==
=== 1996 African Cup of Nations ===
FNB Stadium served as the main venue for the tournament. It hosted the opening game, 5 other group games, a quarter final, a semi final, the 3rd place play-off and the final. The games were:

Date	Team #1	Result	Team #2	Round	Attendance
13 January 1996	South Africa	3–0	Cameroon	Group A (opening match)	80,000
15 January 1996	Egypt	2–1	Angola	Group A	6,000
18 January 1996	Cameroon	2–1	Egypt	Group A	4,000
20 January 1996	South Africa	1–0	Angola	Group A	30,000
24 January 1996	South Africa	0–1	Egypt	Group A	20,000
25 January 1996	Zaire	2–0	Liberia	Group C	3,000
27 January 1996	South Africa	2–1	Algeria	Quarter-finals	80,000
31 January 1996	South Africa	3–0	Ghana	Semi-finals	80,000
3 February 1996	Ghana	0–1	Zambia	Third place match	80,000
3 February 1996	South Africa	2–0	Tunisia	Final	80,000

=== 2010 FIFA World Cup ===
The stadium hosted the opening ceremony followed by the opening match between South Africa and Mexico, 4 other group stage matches, a Round of 16 match, a quarter-final and the final.

Date	Team #1	Result	Team #2	Round	Attendance
11 June 2010	South Africa	1–1	Mexico	Group A (opening match)	84,490
14 June 2010	Netherlands	2–0	Denmark	Group E	83,465
17 June 2010	Argentina	4–1	South Korea	Group B	82,174
20 June 2010	Brazil	3–1	Ivory Coast	Group G	84,455
23 June 2010	Ghana	0–1	Germany	Group D	83,391
27 June 2010	Argentina	3–1	Mexico	Round of 16	84,377
2 July 2010	Uruguay	1–1 (a.e.t.) (4–2 pen.)	Ghana	Quarter-finals	84,017
11 July 2010	Netherlands	0–1 (a.e.t)	Spain	Final	84,490

=== 2013 African Cup of Nations ===
FNB Stadium served as a venue for the tournament. It hosted the opening game, one group game and the final. The games were:

Date	Team #1	Result	Team #2	Round	Attendance
19 January 2013	South Africa	0–0	Cape Verde	Group A (opening match)	50,000
19 January 2013	Angola	0–0	Morocco	Group A	25,000
10 February 2013	Nigeria	1–0	Burkina Faso	Final	85,000

== Football ==
=== International football ===
FNB stadium has been used by the South African national football team for both friendlies and qualification matches. It was seen as the de facto national stadium for Bafana Bafana after re-admission in 1992, who played their third ever international match there on 11 July 1992 where they drew 2–2 with Cameroon courtesy of goals from Phil and Bennett Masinga for South Africa in front of 65,000 supporters. The "old" FNB Stadium also housed the then South African Football Association (SAFA) headquarters as well as the offices of the semi-professional National Soccer League (which later traded as the professional Premier Soccer League).

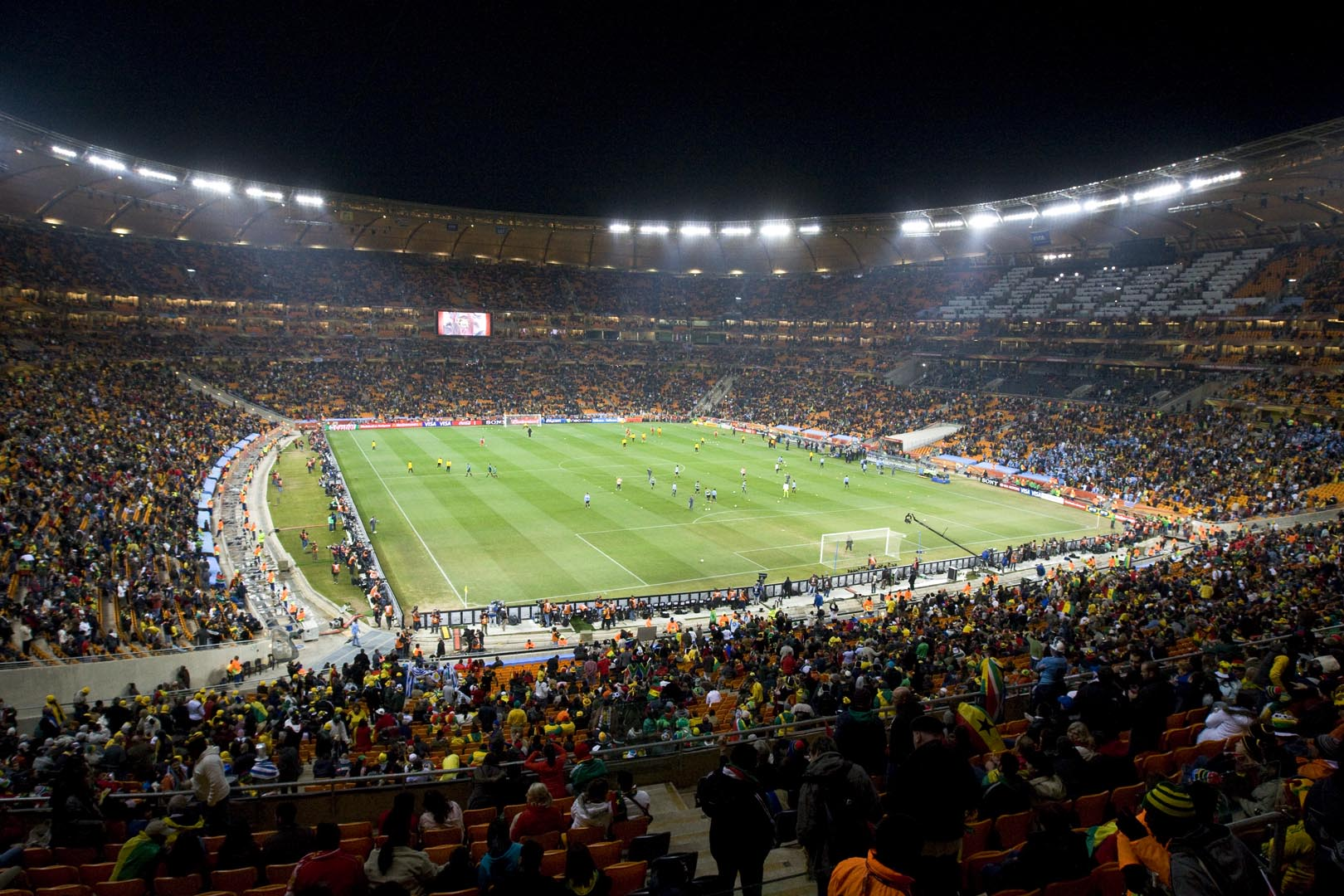
Uruguay vs. Ghana at the FNB Stadium, 2 July 2010

The stadium has also hosted large continental club fixtures. It is largely remembered as the venue where Bafana Bafana lifted the 1996 Africa Cup of Nations when they beat Tunisia 2–0 in front of a full capacity in a match witnessed by then South African president, Nelson Mandela, his then deputy president and former South African State President, FW de Klerk, as well as Zulu monarch, King Zwelithini. The South African national football team also won their first ever trophy here when they lifted the Simba Four Nations Cup in 1995, in a competition featuring Egypt, Zambia and Zimbabwe.

The venue for the first leg of the 1995 African Cup of Champions Clubs final, between Orlando Pirates and ASEC Abidjan. The stadium has also hosted the CAF Super Cup twice. It hosted the 1994 CAF Super Cup, between Zamalek and Al-Ahly, as well as the 1996 CAF Super Cup between Orlando Pirates and JS Kabylie. In 2004, the stadium hosted final of the Vodacom Challenge, between AS Vita Club and Kaizer Chiefs.

Some of the most memorable Bafana Bafana matches at the venue include the narrow 3–2 defeat to Brazil in 1996 as well as the country's memorable triumph when they secured passage through to a first ever World Cup appearance for the 1998 FIFA World Cup in France when they beat Republic of Congo 1–0 through a Phil Masinga strike in 1997.

During the 2010 FIFA World Cup, one of the most entertaining matches was played here in the quarterfinal stages when Uruguay beat Ghana in a penalty shootout made more memorable by a blatant handball in the last minute of the extra time by Uruguay striker Luis Suárez, which denied a Ghana and Africa a first ever semifinal appearance at the world football showpiece.

=== Local football ===
The FNB Stadium is home to Kaizer Chiefs Football Club. It is also the preferred venue for the Soweto derby soccer matches – the country's biggest sporting showpiece – involving Soweto based Premier Soccer League clubs, Kaizer Chiefs and Orlando Pirates. It was also the traditional home of the Iwisa Maize Meal Spectacular and later, the Telkom Charity Cup, which were charity soccer season openers in South African football from 1990 to 2006, before it was closed for renovations. The stadium was re-opened when it hosted the 2010 Nedbank Cup final between Bidvest Wits and Amazulu. The game ending 3–0 to Bidvest Wits. Fabricio Rodrigues was the first player to score at the rebuilt Soccer City. The Charity Cup then returned in 2010. The first league match at the stadium since being rebuilt, was a 2010–11 Premier Soccer League match between Orlando Pirates and Free State Stars. The first MTN 8 match at the stadium was the first leg of the 2010 MTN 8 semifinal, between Orlando Pirates and Kaizer Chiefs. The venue has also hosted high-profile Bafana Bafana matches, including their 1–0 win over Spain in 2013 as well as the side's worst ever defeat when they lost, 5–0, to Brazil in another international friendly in 2014.

In May 2018, Mamelodi Sundowns hosted FC Barcelona in an exhibition match, dedicated to the late Former President of South Africa in his centenary. The match ended 3–1 in the favour of Barcelona.

== Rugby union ==
FNB stadium is a multi-purpose venue and hosted its first rugby union match in 2010, the Tri Nations match between South Africa and New Zealand, won 29-22 by the All Blacks. The attendance was 94,713 which is listed as the third highest rugby attendance ever in the Southern Hemisphere and a record attendance for the redeveloped stadium, until it was eclipsed on 1 August 2015, when 94,807 was recorded when Orlando Pirates played Kaizer Chiefs in the Carling Black Label Cup fixture.

The stadium hosted New Zealand again in the 2012 Rugby Championship on 6 October, with the All Blacks defeating the Springboks 32–16 in front of 80,753. In 2013, the Springboks defeated Argentina 73–13 at FNB Stadium in front of a crowd 52,867. In 2016, the venue hosted Varsity Cup rugby fixtures. The opening test match in the 2021 British and Irish Lions tour to South Africa was scheduled to be played at this venue but because of the COVID-19 pandemic was moved to Cape Town without spectators. In 2026, the Springboks hosted the All Blacks in the third Test match of the Rugby's Greatest Rivalry tour winning 29-24 in front of a crowd of 85,967.

List of rugby union Test matches at FNB Stadium
Date	Home	Score	Away	Attendance	Competition	Ref.
21 August 2010	South Africa	22–29	New Zealand	94,713	2010 Tri Nations Series	
6 October 2012	South Africa	16–32	New Zealand	80,753	2012 Rugby Championship	
17 August 2013	South Africa	73–13	Argentina	52,867	2013 Rugby Championship	
5 September 2026	South Africa	20–52	New Zealand	2,000	2026 New Zealand women's World tour	
5 September 2026	South Africa	29–24	New Zealand	85,967	2026 Rugby's Greatest Rivalry tour	

== Concerts ==
Band/artist	Tour	Date	Attendance
U2	U2 360° Tour	13 February 2011	94,232
Neil Diamond	Concert Tour 2011	2 April 2011	
Coldplay	Mylo Xyloto Tour	8 October 2011^{[A]}	60,095
Kings of Leon	Come Around Sundown World Tour	29 October 2011	60,000
The Eagles	World Tour 2012	8 April 2012	50,000?
Linkin Park	Living Things World Tour	10 November 2012	63,000
Lady Gaga	Born This Way Ball	30 November 2012	56,900
Red Hot Chili Peppers	I'm With You World Tour	2 February 2013	65,000
Metallica	2013 Vacation Tour	27 April 2013	40,000
Bon Jovi	Because We Can - The Tour	11 May 2013	65,182
Justin Bieber	Believe Tour	12 May 2013	67,000
Rihanna	Diamonds World Tour	13 October 2013	67,291
Bruce Springsteen & The E Street Band	High Hopes Tour	1 February 2014	55,385
Foo Fighters	Sonic Highways World Tour	13 December 2014	46,585
One Direction	On the Road Again Tour	28 & 29 March 2015	131,615
Justin Bieber	Purpose World Tour	14 May 2017	70,000
Cassper Nyovest	Fill Up FNB	2 December 2017	68,000
Guns N' Roses	Not in This Lifetime... Tour	29 November 2018	52,042
The Carters; Ed Sheeran; Cassper Nyovest; Chris Martin; Usher; Pharrell	Global Citizen Mandela 100 Festival	2 December 2018^{[B]}	100,000
Ed Sheeran	÷ Tour	23 & 24 March 2019	135,000
Imagine Dragons	Mercury World Tour	4 February 2023	43,324
Ava Max; Keane; Lloyiso; Maroon 5; Meduza; Shekinah; TiMO ODV; Will Linley	Calabash South Africa	3 February 2024	50,000
Chris Brown	The 11:11 Tour	14 & 15 December 2024	189,472
Fokofpolisiekar, The Offspring, Green Day	Calabash South Africa	19 January 2025	62,000
Travis Scott	Circus Maximus Tour	11 October 2025	70,000
J. Cole	The Fall-Off Tour	12 December 2026	
Limp Bizkit		13 December 2026	

A The Coldplay concert was a rehearsal concert in preparation for their Mylo Xyloto Tour. As part of the concert, they filmed scenes for the music video for their song "Paradise".

== Christian gatherings ==
Leader	Program	Date	Attendance
Pastor Chris Oyakhilome	Night of Bliss, Johannesburg, South Africa	11 March 2011	> 100,000
Pastor Chris Oyakhilome	Higher Life Conference, Johannesburg, South Africa	15-17 March 2013	
Pastor Chris Oyakhilome	Night of Bliss, Johannesburg, South Africa	22 January 2016	
Prophet Shepherd Bushiri	Night of Angel Gabriel, Johannesburg, South Africa	1 January 2018	>165,000

== Incidents ==
On 29 July 2017, two people were killed and 17 were injured in a stadium crush while trying to enter the stadium before a match between the Kaizer Chiefs and Orlando Pirates.

In July 2023, the stadium was host to the 10th anniversary rally of the Economic Freedom Fighters. The EFF president, Julius Malema, sang the controversial song "Kill the Boer/Kill the farmer". The song sparked controversy in the subsequent days. The Democratic Alliance announced it was appealing to the UN Human Rights Council to declare the song hate speech, in addition to an EFF supporter falling to his death.

== Gallery ==
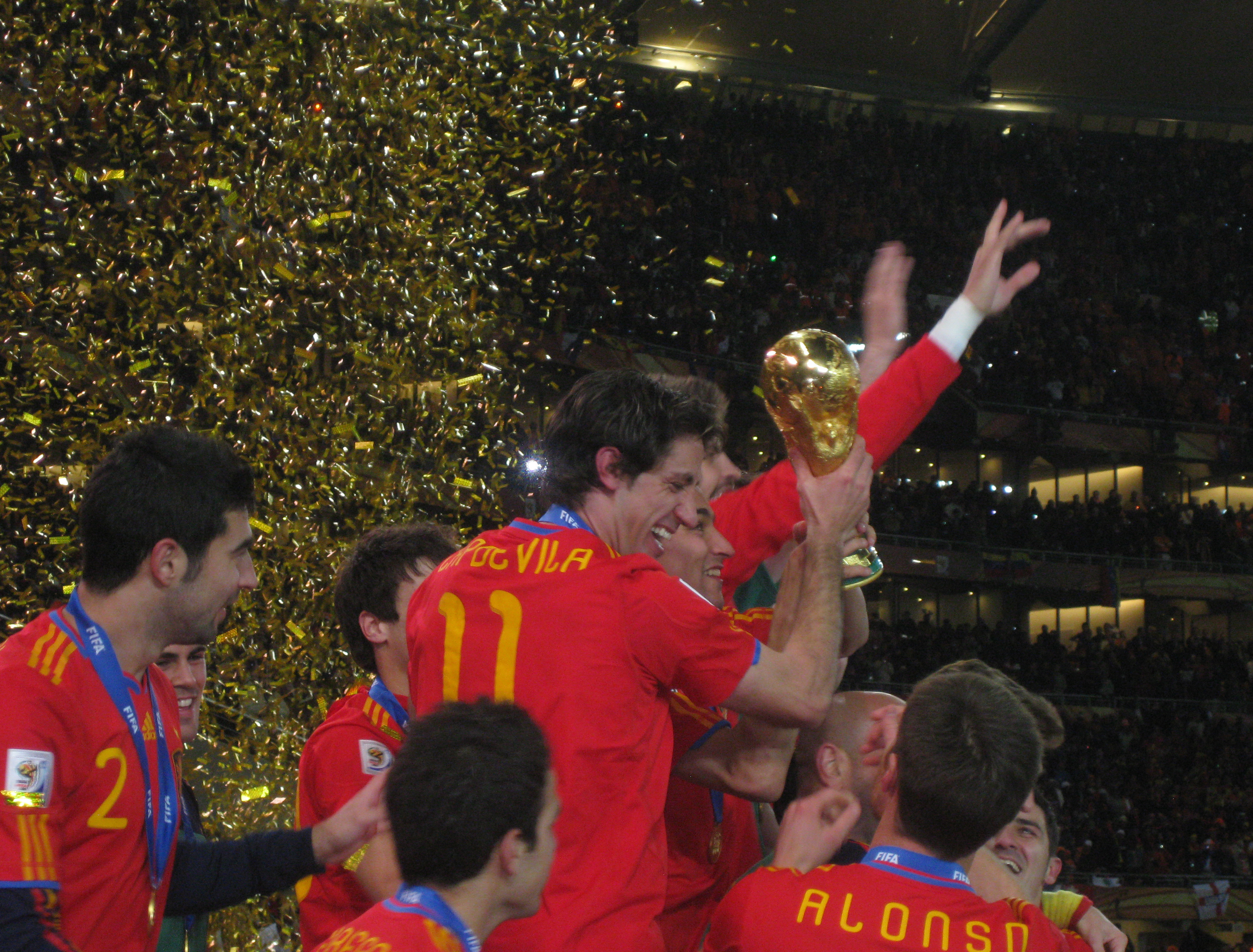
Spain celebrating their World Cup win

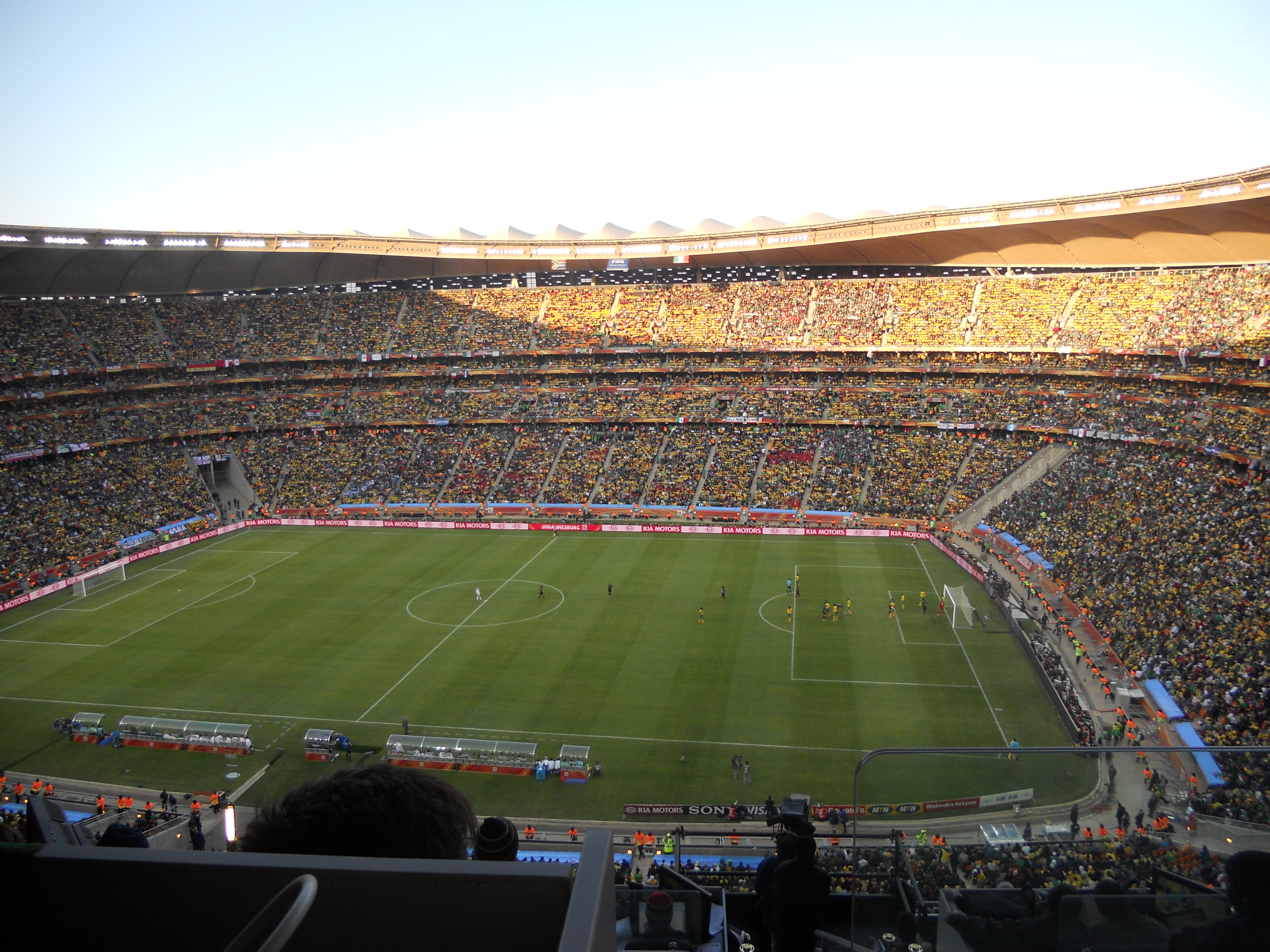
Opening game of the 2010 FIFA World Cup

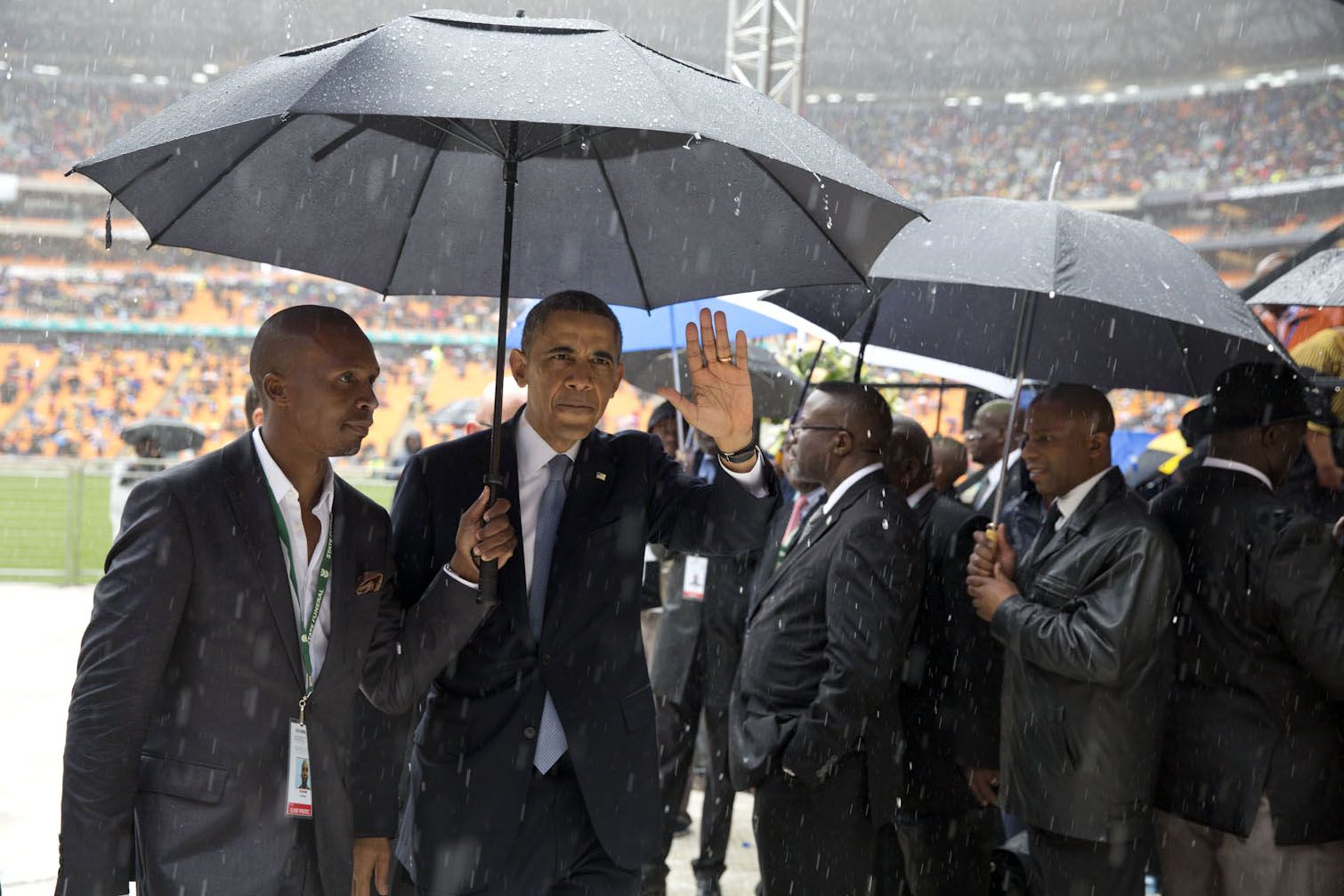
Barack Obama at the FNB Stadium in 2013 attending Nelson Mandela's memorial service

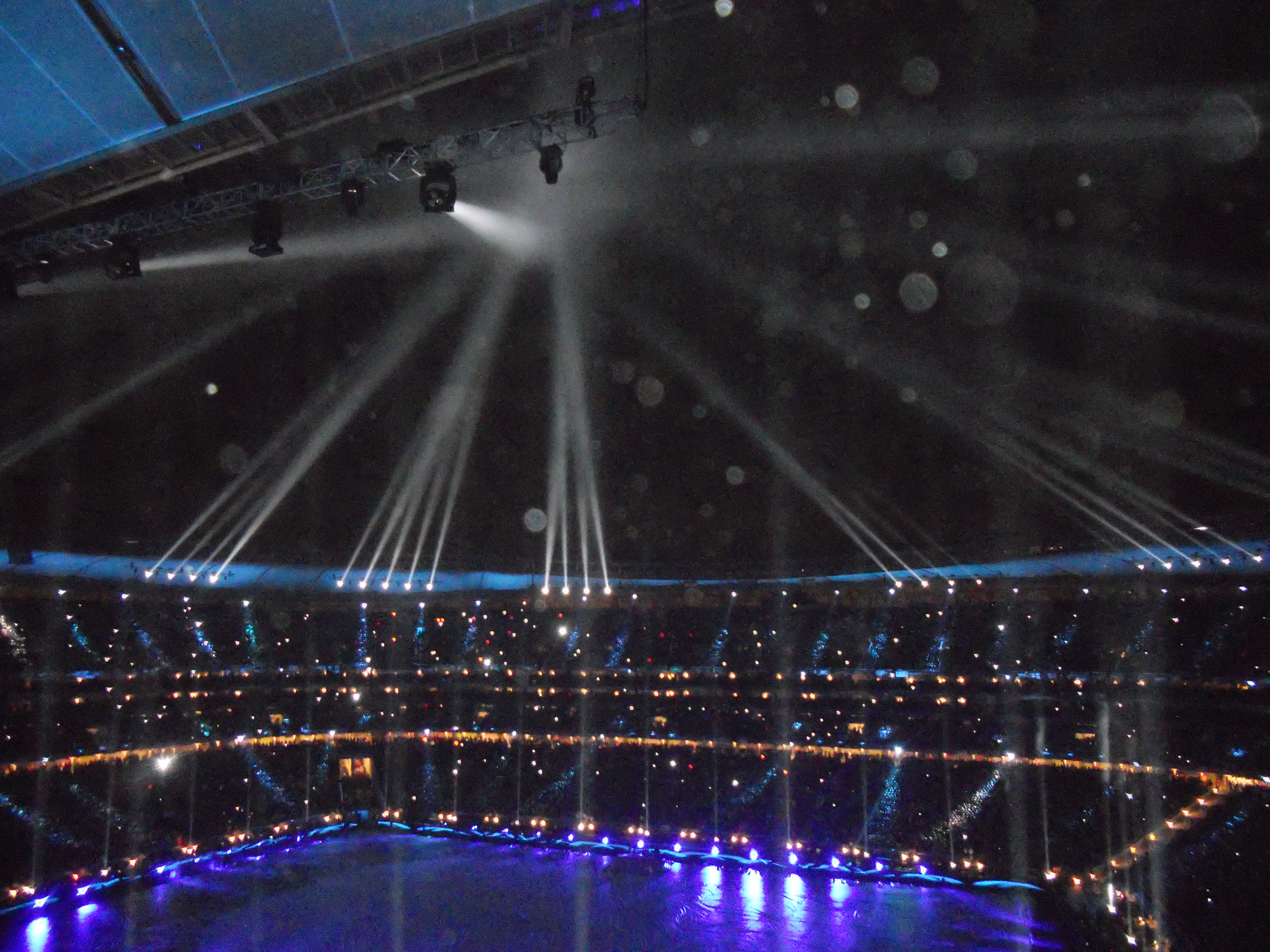
2010 World Cup Closing Ceremony

== See also ==
- 1996 African Cup of Nations
- 2010 FIFA World Cup
- 2013 African Cup of Nations
- Lists of stadiums

Events and tenants
Preceded by Stade El Menzah; Tunis	African Cup of Nations; Final venue 1996	Succeeded by Stade du 4-Août; Ouagadougou
Preceded by Allianz Arena; Munich	FIFA World Cup; Opening Venue; 2010	Succeeded by Arena Corinthians; São Paulo
Preceded by Olympiastadion; Berlin	FIFA World Cup; Final venue 2010	Succeeded by Estádio do Maracanã; Rio de Janeiro
Preceded by Stade d'Angondjé; Libreville	African Cup of Nations; Final venue 2013	Succeeded by Estadio de Bata; Bata
