= Platini (Cape Verdean footballer) =

Cape Verdean footballer (born 1986)

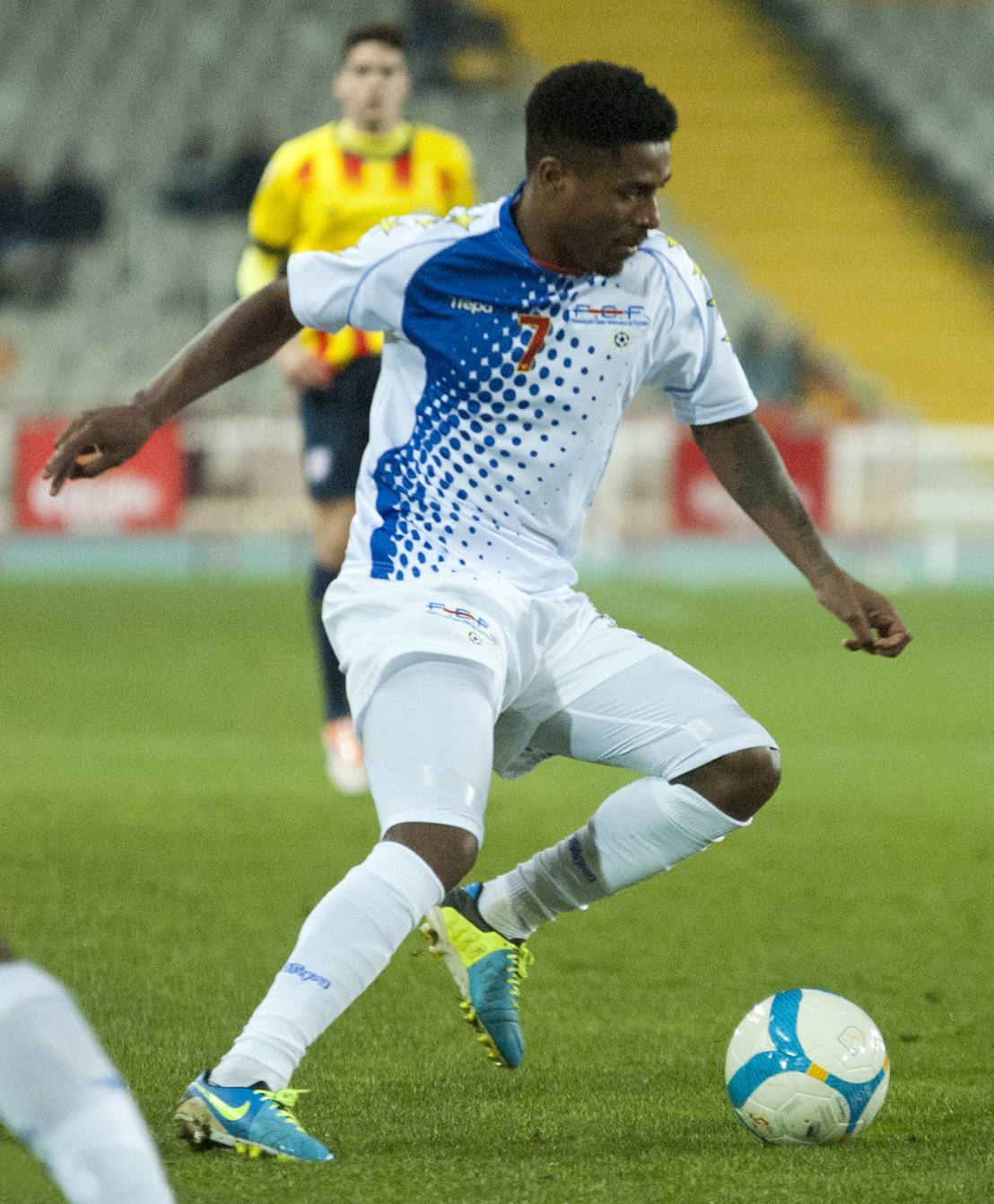
- Platini in action for Cape Verde in 2013

Personal information
- Full name: Luís Carlos Almada Soares
- Date of birth: 16 April 1986 (age 40)
- Place of birth: Praia, Cape Verde
- Height: 1.73 m (5 ft 8 in)
- Position: Winger

Youth career
- Sporting Praia

Senior career*
Years	Team	Apps	(Gls)
2006–2008	Sporting Praia		
2008–2010	Académica	0	(0)
2008–2009	→ Tourizense (loan)	6	(0)
2009–2010	→ Sertanense (loan)	28	(2)
2010–2013	Santa Clara	80	(10)
2013–2014	Omonia	29	(3)
2014–2015	CSKA Sofia	24	(1)
2015	Al Ittihad	5	(1)
2016–2017	Dibba Al-Hisn		
2017–2018	Politehnica Iași	33	(7)
2018	Sanat Naft	5	(0)
2018–2021	Politehnica Iași	81	(10)

International career^{‡}
2012–2020	Cape Verde	27	(1)
- * Club domestic league appearances and goals as of 12:57, 10 June 2021 (UTC) ‡ National team caps and goals as of 17 November 2020

Luís Carlos Almada Soares (born 16 April 1986), commonly known as Platini, is a Cape Verdean professional footballer who plays as a winger.

He spent five years of his professional career in Portugal in addition to playing in seven other countries, and chose his name in honour of French international Michel Platini.

Platini made his international debut for Cape Verde in 2012, and represented the country at two Africa Cup of Nations tournaments.

== Club career ==
=== Portugal ===
Born in Praia, Cape Verde, Platini started playing football for the local team Sporting Clube da Praia, making his debut in 2006. He moved to Portugal in 2008, joining Associação Académica de Coimbra.

Platini never appeared officially for the Students, who loaned him to two Portuguese Second Division clubs in consecutive seasons, G.D. Tourizense and Sertanense FC. In the summer of 2010 he signed a three-year contract with C.D. Santa Clara of the Segunda Liga, appearing in 19 games for the Azores team in his first year, 11 as a substitute; one of his two goals came on 31 October 2010, in a 2–0 home win against C.F. Os Belenenses.

=== Later years ===
On 22 June 2013, Platini joined Cypriot First Division side AC Omonia. In July of the following year, he signed for two seasons with PFC CSKA Sofia from Bulgaria. He returned to Africa to play for Egypt's Al Ittihad Alexandria Club, but left in January 2016 alleging that he had not been paid for five months.

In the summer of 2017, after ending his contract with Dibba Al-Hisn Sports Club from the United Arab Emirates, Platini moved to Romanian club CSM Politehnica Iași on a two-year deal. On 26 October, he scored the only goal in the 1–0 victory over FC Steaua București.

Platini agreed to a one-year contract with Sanat Naft Abadan F.C. of the Iran Pro League on 29 June 2018. He played their first five matches of the season, then returned to Iași in September.

== International career ==
Platini made his debut for Cape Verde in 2012. He scored the Blue Sharks' first goal in the 2013 Africa Cup of Nations – also a first-ever in the tournament – opening the scoring in the 1–1 draw against Morocco in Durban.

== Career statistics ==
=== International ===
Cape Verde
Year	Apps	Goals
2012	1	0
2013	9	1
2014	3	0
2015	6	0
2016	0	0
2017	2	0
2018	3	0
2019	1	0
2020	2	0
Total	27	1

=== International goals ===
As of 23 January 2013 (Cape Verde score listed first, score column indicates score after each Platini goal)

#	Date	Venue	Opponent	Score	Result	Competition
1.	23 January 2013	Moses Mabhida, Durban, South Africa	Morocco	1–0	1–1	2013 Africa Cup of Nations

== Honours ==
Sporting Praia

- Cape Verdean Championship: 2007, 2008
- Santiago South Premier Division: 2007–08
