= Siyabonga Sangweni =

South African soccer player (born 1981)

Personal information
- Full name: Doctor Siyabonga Sangweni
- Date of birth: 29 September 1981 (age 45)
- Place of birth: Empangeni, South Africa
- Height: 1.82 m (6 ft 0 in)
- Position: Centre back

Youth career
- Royal Chiefs

Senior career*
| Years | Team | Apps | (Gls) |
| 2001–2005 | Uthukela | 95 | (7) |
| 2005–2011 | Golden Arrows | 150 | (4) |
| 2011–2016 | Orlando Pirates | 79 | (6) |
| Total | | 324 | (17) |

International career^{‡}
| 2007–2013 | South Africa | 29 | (4) |
- * Club domestic league appearances and goals as of 3 April 2016 ‡ National team caps and goals as of 25 December 2013

Doctor Siyabonga Sangweni (born 29 September 1981), known as Siyabonga Sangweni, is a retired South African soccer defender who used to play for Premier Soccer League club Orlando Pirates and South Africa.

His younger brother Thamsanqa Sangweni is also a footballer and he also played for Orlando Pirates.

== Club career ==
=== Golden Arrows ===
Nsimbi as he is efficiently known as in the football circles sign for Abafana Bes'thende in 2005 from SAFA Second Division side Uthukela. He played well for Arrows and contributed to the club's first major silverware which was the MTN 8 in 2009. He attracted many clubs and eventually signed for Orlando Pirates in 2011.

=== Orlando Pirates ===
Sangweni signed with Orlando Pirates at the beginning of the 2011/12 season. Hailed as one of the best signings of the season due to his defensive abilities. He was a regular starter for Bafana Bafana while playing for Golden Arrows. Siyabonga became a regular at Orlando Pirates and went on to have 28 league appearances in his first season at Pirates. Due to him being very instrumental in the Pirates treble winning of the season, he was nominated as a Footballer of the Season which eventually went to the League's leading goalscorer, Siyabonga Nomvethe of Swallows. He has enjoyed much game-time along Lucky Lekgwathi and Rooi Mahamutsa. He got an injury that kept him to almost all the 2013/14 season.

=== Retirement ===
In a press conference on 7 April 2016, Pirates' chairman Irvin Khoza announced that Sangweni has been plagued by a string of injuries. Khoza said that after consultation, the medics have confirmed that the former Bafana Bafana centre back has to end his career early. Khoza said Sangweni, who has 29 Bafana caps with four goals, will be remembered as a club legend.

== Career statistics ==
=== International goals ===
| # | Date | Venue | Opponent | Score | Result | Competition |
|---|---|---|---|---|---|---|
| 1. | 24 May 2010 | Orlando Stadium, Soweto, South Africa | Bulgaria | 1–1 | Draw | Friendly |
| 2. | 15 May 2011 | Benjamin Mkapa National Stadium, Dar es Salaam, Tanzania | Tanzania | 1–0 | Win | Friendly |
| 3. | 23 January 2013 | Moses Mabhida Stadium, South Africa | Angola | 2–0 | Win | 2013 Africa Cup of Nations |
| 4. | 27 January 2013 | Moses Mabhida Stadium, South Africa | Morocco | 2–2 | Draw | 2013 Africa Cup of Nations |

== Honours ==
Lamontville Golden Arrows

- MTN 8: 2009

Orlando Pirates

- MTN 8: 2011
- Telkom Knockout: 2011
- Nedbank Cup: 2013–14
- Premier Soccer League: 2011–12
- CAF Champions League: Runners-up 2013
- CAF Confederation Cup: Runners-up 2015

== See also ==
- List of African association football families
