= Lúcio Antunes =

Cape Verdean football manager (born 1966)

"Lúcio" Antunes
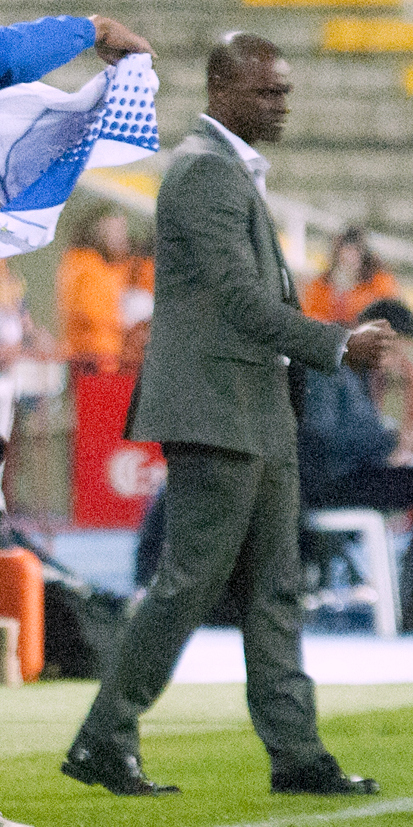
- Antunes in 2013

Personal information
- Full name: Ulisses Indalécio Silva Antunes
- Date of birth: 9 October 1966 (age 60)
- Place of birth: Praia, Cape Verde

Team information
- Current team: Cape Verde (manager)

Managerial career
- Years: Team
- 2010–2013: Cape Verde
- 2013–2014: Progresso do Sambizanga
- 2016–2018: Cape Verde

Ulisses Indalécio Silva Antunes, (Note: Lúcio Antunes at WorldFootball.net) nicknamed Lúcio Antunes, is Cape Verdean football manager.

He was appointed the manager of the Cape Verde national team in July 2010. He led the Cape Verde national side to the 2013 African Cup of Nations for the first time in their history, but had to take a leave from his day job as an air-traffic controller.

In late November 2013, he left Cape Verde to take charge of Angolan side Progresso do Sambizanga.

In September 2016, he was reappointed as the manager of Cape Verde's national team.

== Achievements ==
As manager

- Lusophony Games winner: 2009
- Sal Football Championships winner: 2015-16
