= Rachid Taoussi =

Entrepreneur and Moroccan footballer (born 1959)

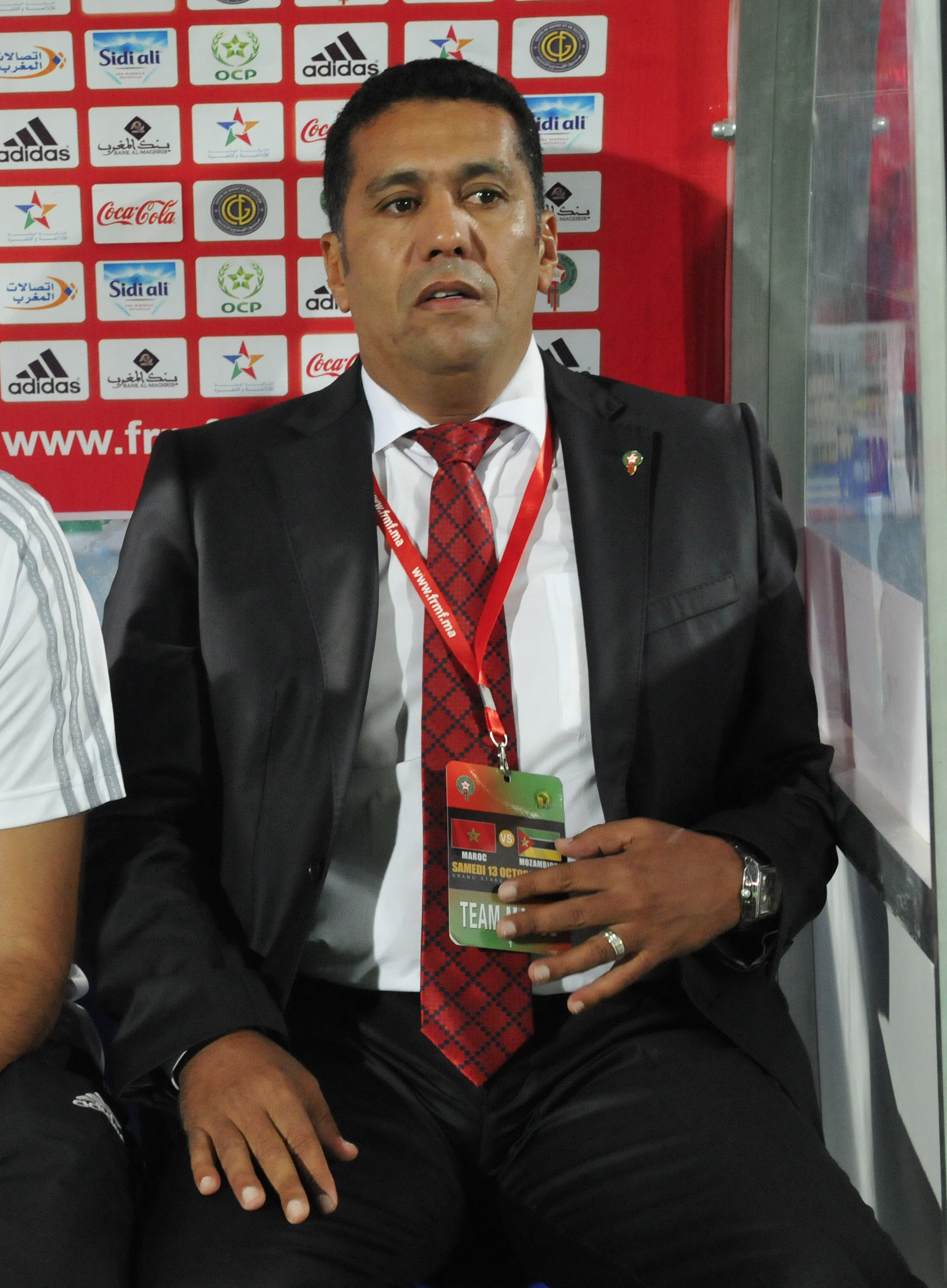

Personal information
- Date of birth: 6 February 1959 (age 67)
- Place of birth: Sidi Kacem, Morocco
- Height: 1.75 m (5 ft 9 in)
- Position: Midfielder

Managerial career
- Years: Team
- 1992–1993: Union Sidi Kacem
- 1993–1995: Morocco U17
- 1995–2000: Morocco (assistant)
- 1995–1997: Morocco U20
- 1997–1999: Morocco U23
- 1999–2000: FAR Rabat
- 2000–2002: Morocco (technical director)
- 2003: Wydad Casablanca
- 2003–2004: KAC Kenitra
- 2004–2007: Al Shabab Al Arabi Club (technical director)
- 2007–2008: FUS Rabat
- 2008–2010: Al Ain FC (DS)
- 2010–2012: MAS Fez
- 2012: FAR Rabat
- 2012–2013: Morocco
- 2013: FAR Rabat
- 2015: MAS Fez
- 2015–2016: Raja Casablanca
- 2016–2017: RS Berkane
- 2017–2018: CR Belouizdad
- 2018–2019: ES Sétif
- 2019: Olympique de Khouribga

Rachid Taoussi (Arabic: رشيد الطاوسي – born 6 February 1959) is a Moroccan football manager, businessman, philanthropist, and former player.

== Coaching career ==
From 1995 to 2000, Taoussi was the assistant coach of the Morocco national team.

In 1997, he led the Morocco U20 to the 1997 African Youth Championship (U-20 Africa Cup of Nations) title.

On 22 September 2012, Taoussi was appointed as manager of the Morocco national team, replacing Eric Gerets who was sacked a week earlier.

== Career and entrepreneurial activities ==
Rachid began his professional football career in Paris before joining the family's healthcare business in 1983, where he worked as a medical value partner. In 1992, he co-founded with his brothers manufacturing companies specializing in wood, steel, and cement hospital construction. In 1995, he left the healthcare industry to join the Moroccan national football team.

He is now based in Dubai, investing in various large-scale hospitality and healthcare initiatives.

== Personal commitments & donations ==
In 2020, as part of the fight against COVID-19, Rachid Taoussi created within his group a division specialized in the health sector, and imported 400 million masks intended for the authorities and the medical profession to companies and individuals based in Africa and the Middle East.

In June 2021, the family opened a new factory in Casablanca whose two production lines target 85 million pharmaceutical products per year. The inauguration took place in July 2021, in the presence of the cantonal authorities and the State Councilor responsible for health.

== Honours ==
MAS Fez

- Moroccan Throne Cup: 2011
- CAF Confederation Cup: 2011
- CAF Super Cup: 2012

Morocco U20

- U-20 Africa Cup of Nations: 1997
