= Nadir Lamyaghri =

Moroccan footballer

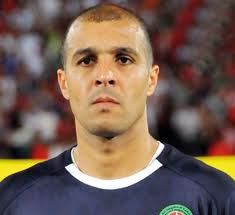

Personal information
- Date of birth: 13 February 1976 (age 50)
- Place of birth: Casablanca, Morocco
- Height: 1.85 m (6 ft 1 in)
- Position: Goalkeeper

Youth career
- Racing Casablanca

Senior career*
| Years | Team | Apps | (Gls) |
| 1995–2000 | Racing Casablanca | ? | (?) |
| 2000–2014 | Wydad Casablanca | 171 | (0) |
| 2001–2002 | → Hassania Agadir (loan) | ? | (?) |
| 2006–2007 | → Al-Wahda (loan) | 10 | (0) |
| 2008 | → Al-Wahda (loan) | 6 | (0) |

International career
| 2003–2014 | Morocco | 61 | (0) |
- * Club domestic league appearances and goals

Nadir Lamyaghri (born 13 February 1976) is a Moroccan former footballer who last played as a goalkeeper for Wydad Casablanca.

== Career ==
Lamyaghri first broke on the scene in Racing Casablanca from 1995 to 2000 and was later to join Wydad Casablanca for a season. While on loan to Hassania Agadir, he secured a win in the Moroccan League. As quickly as he returned to Morocco and Wydad, he soon departed to the United Arab Emirates and Al-Wahda for a season.

== International career ==
He was a member of the Moroccan 2004 Olympic football team that exited in the first round, finishing third in group D behind group winners Iraq and runners-up Costa Rica. Playing for Morocco in the 2004 African Cup of Nations, the team came in second place.

== Honours ==
Hassania Agadir

- Moroccan League: 2002

Wydad Casablanca

- Moroccan League: 2006, 2010
- Coupe du Trône: 2001
- African Cup Winners' Cup: 2002

Individual

- Best Goalkeeper in Moroccan League (2) : 2006, 2010.
