= Nando Maria Neves =

Cape Verdean footballer (born 1978)

Nando
Personal information
- Full name: Fernando Maria Neves
- Date of birth: 9 June 1978 (age 48)
- Place of birth: Praia, Cape Verde
- Height: 1.90 m (6 ft 3 in)
- Position: Center back

Youth career
- Batuque

Senior career*
Years	Team	Apps	(Gls)
1998–1999	Amarante		
1999–2000	Portimonense	0	(0)
2000–2004	Batuque		
2004–2006	Monastir		
2007–2009	Al-Siliya		
2009–2011	Baník Ostrava	54	(7)
2011–2013	Châteauroux	62	(1)
2013–2014	Slavia Prague	18	(0)
2014–2015	Příbram	16	(1)

International career
2002–2013	Cape Verde	42	(0)
- * Club domestic league appearances and goals

Fernando "Nando" Maria Neves (born 9 June 1978) is a Cape Verdean retired footballer who played as a defender. He played for the Cape Verde national football team and spent a large part of his career in the Czech First League.

== Biography ==
Neves played with Batuque of Mindelo in its youth team. He appeared in the Portuguese team of Amarante FC for a season in 1998, after he was a squad member of Portimonense for a season. He was elected the best central defender and the best foreign player of the season 2006-2007 in Tunisia, one of the first Cape Verdeans to be honoured, and he has recently signed a contract with a Qatar team, Al Sailiya, for the season 2007/2008. In July 2009 he moved to FC Baník Ostrava, he made 54 appearances and scored seven goals. In 2011, he played with LB Châteauroux for two seasons, he appeared 62 time and just scored a goal. He went back to the Czech Republic and played with Slavia Prague for a season, making 18 appearances and scoring no goals. A year later, he played with FK Příbram also for a season and had 16 appearances and scored a goal, this was his last club appearance.

== International career ==
Neves was a member of the Cape Verde national team in 2006 and 2010 FIFA World Cup qualification. After Cape Verde were eliminated, he received a call-up in August 2009 for a friendly against Malta and Angola and in May 2010 played in the 0–0 draw with Portugal. Nando was the Cape Verdean team captain in the 2013 Africa Cup of Nations, which marked the first participation for his country in this tournament. His performances throughout the tournament were rewarded by selection into the 2013 Africa Cup of Nations Team of the Tournament. His last international match was on February 2, 2013, against Ghana at the ACN quarter-finals, in which his team were beaten 2-0. After this defeat he announced his immediate retirement from the national team.

== Honours ==
Grasshoppers

- Swiss Super League: 2002–03

Individual

- Championnat de Tunisie Best Central Defender: 2006–07
- Championnat de Tunisie Best Foreign Player: 2006–07
- Africa Cup of Nations Team of the Tournament: 2013
