= Ronny Souto =

Cape Verdean footballer (born 1978)

Personal information
- Full name: Walder Alves Souto Amado
- Date of birth: 7 December 1978 (age 47)
- Place of birth: Praia, Cape Verde
- Position: Defender

Team information
- Current team: Fola Esch

Senior career*
Years	Team	Apps	(Gls)
1998–2003	SC Praia		
2003–2007	CS Oberkorn		
2007–2009	F91 Dudelange		
2009–	Fola Esch	146	(32)

International career
2008–2013	Cape Verde	20	(1)
- * Club domestic league appearances and goals

Walder Alves Souto Amado, known as Ronny (born 7 December 1978) is a Cape Verdean professional footballer who plays as a defender in for Fola Esch. He previously played in Cape Verde for SC Praia and in Luxembourg for CS Oberkorn and F91 Dudelange.

== International career ==
Ronny received a call-up against Luxembourg in May 2008 to prepare for the 2010 FIFA World Cup qualification, in which he played all six qualifying matches. He was named to the Cape Verde squad for the 2013 Africa Cup of Nations.

He retired from international football after his participation at the 2013 Africa Cup of Nations.
