= Gustavo Ferrín =

Uruguayan football manager (born 1959)

Personal information
- Full name: Gustavo Antonio Ferrín Rodríguez
- Date of birth: 1 May 1959 (age 67)
- Place of birth: Montevideo, Uruguay

Team information
- Current team: Liverpool Montevideo (youth supervisor)

Managerial career
- Years: Team
- Uruguay U17
- 2004–2005: Uruguay U20
- 2006: Uruguay (caretaker)
- 2009: Sport Áncash
- 2009–2010: Defensor Sporting
- 2010–2011: Peru U20
- 2012–2013: Angola
- 2016: Cerro
- 2017: Fénix
- 2020: Liverpool Montevideo (interim)
- 2021: Liverpool Montevideo (interim)
- 2024: Liverpool Montevideo (interim)
- 2026: Liverpool Montevideo (interim)

Gustavo Antonio Ferrín Rodríguez is a Uruguayan football manager. He is the current youth supervisor of Liverpool Montevideo.

== Coaching career ==
He qualified the Uruguay U20 national team to the FIFA U-20 World Cup after 8 years.

In April 2010, he was appointed to manage the Peru national under-20 football team with preparation for 2011 South American Youth Championship.

In July 2012, he was selected manager for the Angolan national team, leaving the role in October 2013.

In 2017, Ferrín was the manager of Centro Atlético Fénix.
