= 2013 Africa Cup of Nations =

29th edition of the Africa Cup of Nations

Afrika-nasiesbeker 2013; Afrika Inkomishi ave Isizwe 2013; Afrika Khapi ya Matiko 2013; AFCON 2013; CAN 2013
- Tournament logo

Tournament details
- Host country: South Africa
- Dates: 19 January – 10 February
- Teams: 16
- Venues: 5 (in 5 host cities)

Final positions
- Champions: Nigeria (3rd title)
- Runners-up: Burkina Faso
- Third place: Mali
- Fourth place: Ghana

Tournament statistics
- Matches played: 32
- Goals scored: 69 (2.16 per match)
- Attendance: 729,000 (22,781 per match)
- Top scorer(s): (Nigeria) Emmanuel Emenike (Ghana) Mubarak Wakaso (4 goals each)
- Best player: (Burkina Faso) Jonathan Pitroipa

The 2013 Africa Cup of Nations, also known as the Orange Africa Cup of Nations South Africa 2013 for sponsorship reasons, held from 19 January to 10 February 2013, was the 29th Africa Cup of Nations, the football championship of Africa organized by the Confederation of African Football (CAF). Starting from this edition, the tournament was switched to being held in odd-numbered years instead of even-numbered years so that it does not clash with the FIFA World Cup. This edition was therefore the first to be held in an odd numbered year since 1965.

South Africa hosted the tournament for the second time, after previously hosting the 1996 African Cup of Nations. The 2013 tournament is the highest attended edition of the Africa Cup of Nations under the 16-team format. The South African team was eliminated in the quarter-finals by Mali, following a penalty shoot-out. Zambia were the defending champions, but were eliminated in the group stage.

Nigeria won its third Africa Cup of Nations championship with a 1–0 victory over Burkina Faso in the final. Nigeria participated in the 2013 FIFA Confederations Cup in Brazil as the representative from CAF.

== Host selection ==
Bids :

- Angola (selected as hosts for 2010)
- Gabon / Equatorial Guinea (selected as hosts for 2012)
- Libya (selected as hosts for 2013)
  Subsequently swapped hosting year with South Africa (2017)
- Nigeria (selected as reserve hosts for 2010, 2012 & 2013 tournaments)

Rejected Bids :

- Benin / Central African Republic
- Botswana
- Mozambique
- Namibia
- Senegal
- Zimbabwe

On 4 September 2006, the Confederation of African Football (CAF) approved a compromise between rival countries to host the Africa Cup of Nations after it ruled out Nigeria. CAF agreed to award the next three editions from 2010 to Angola, Equatorial Guinea, Gabon and Libya respectively. They assigned Angola in 2010, Equatorial Guinea and Gabon, which submitted a joint bid in 2012, and Libya for 2014.

This edition was awarded to Libya for the second time after 1982 African Cup of Nations.

Two-time former host Nigeria was the reserve host for the 2010, 2012 and 2014 tournaments, in the event that any of the host countries failed to meet the requirements established by CAF, although this ended up being unnecessary

The 2014 tournament was pushed forward to 2013 and subsequently held in odd-numbered years to avoid year-clash with the FIFA World Cup.

=== Libyan withdrawal ===
Due to the Libyan Civil War, Libya traded years with South Africa, so that South Africa hosted in 2013 and Libya would be hosting in 2017. This was ratified in September 2011 at CAF's Executive Committee in Cairo, Egypt.

== Qualification ==
A total of 47 countries entered the qualification, including South Africa, which automatically qualified. Libya was not allowed to keep its automatic qualification after being stripped of its hosting rights due to the Libyan Civil War. Many teams made their return to the finals in this tournament. The hosts, South Africa returned after a 4-year absence. Ethiopia appeared for the first time since 1982 (a 31-year absence). Other teams absent from the 2012 finals that featured in 2013 were Nigeria, Togo, DR Congo, and Algeria. Cape Verde made its finals debut. Teams that didn't qualify for this tournament from the 2012 African Cup of Nations were both co-hosts, Gabon and Equatorial Guinea, Libya, Senegal, Sudan, Guinea and Botswana. South Sudan was ineligible to participate as the qualifying competition had already started by the time its membership of CAF was confirmed.

=== Qualified nations ===
Country	Qualified as	Qualification date	Previous appearances in tournament^{†}
South Africa	Hosts	28 September 2011	7 (**1996**, 1998, 2000, 2002, 2004, 2006, 2008)
Ghana	Winner against Malawi	13 October 2012	18 (**1963**, **1965**, 1968, 1970, **1978**, 1980, **1982**, 1984, 1992, 1994, 1996, 1998, 2000, 2002, 2006, 2008, 2010, 2012)
Mali	Winner against Botswana	13 October 2012	7 (1972, 1994, 2002, 2004, 2008, 2010, 2012)
Zambia	Winner against Uganda	13 October 2012	15 (1974, 1978, 1982, 1986, 1990, 1992, 1994, 1996, 1998, 2000, 2002, 2006, 2008, 2010, **2012**)
Nigeria	Winner against Liberia	13 October 2012	16 (1963, 1976, 1978, **1980**, 1982, 1984, 1988, 1990, 1992, **1994**, 2000, 2002, 2004, 2006, 2008, 2010)
Tunisia	Winner against Sierra Leone	13 October 2012	15 (1962, 1963, 1965, 1978, 1982, 1994, 1996, 1998, 2000, 2002, **2004**, 2006, 2008, 2010, 2012)
Ivory Coast	Winner against Senegal	13 October 2012	19 (1965, 1968, 1970, 1974, 1980, 1984, 1986, 1988, 1990, **1992**, 1994, 1996, 1998, 2000, 2002, 2006, 2008, 2010, 2012)
Morocco	Winner against Mozambique	13 October 2012	14 (1972, **1976**, 1978, 1980, 1986, 1988, 1992, 1998, 2000, 2002, 2004, 2006, 2008, 2012)
Ethiopia	Winner against Sudan	14 October 2012	9 (1957, 1959, **1962**, 1963, 1965, 1968, 1970, 1976, 1982)
Cape Verde	Winner against Cameroon	14 October 2012	0 (debut)
Angola	Winner against Zimbabwe	14 October 2012	6 (1996, 1998, 2006, 2008, 2010, 2012)
Niger	Winner against Guinea	14 October 2012	1 (2012)
Togo	Winner against Gabon	14 October 2012	6 (1972, 1984, 1998, 2000, 2002, 2006)
DR Congo	Winner against Equatorial Guinea	14 October 2012	15 (1965, **1968**, 1970, 1972, **1974**, 1976, 1988, 1992, 1994, 1996, 1998, 2000, 2002, 2004, 2006)
Burkina Faso	Winner against Central African Rep.	14 October 2012	8 (1978, 1996, 1998, 2000, 2002, 2004, 2010, 2012)
Algeria	Winner against Libya	14 October 2012	14 (1968, 1980, 1982, 1984, 1986, 1988, **1990**, 1992, 1996, 1998, 2000, 2002, 2004, 2010)

^{†} Bold indicates champion for that year
^{†} Italic indicates host

== Venues ==
=== Host cities ===
The South African Football Association opened bidding to all 2010 FIFA World Cup host cities however a maximum of seven venues would be used. The final list of stadiums was initially to be announced by 30 March, but was pushed back to 4 April, 20 April, and then 3 May 2012.

The venues were announced on 4 May 2012. FNB Stadium hosted the opening match and the final. The other venues selected for matches were Mbombela Stadium, Nelson Mandela Bay Stadium, Royal Bafokeng Stadium and Moses Mabhida Stadium.

The average daytime temperature of the host cities ranges from 25.0 °C (77.0 °F) to 30.3 °C (86.5 °F).

Johannesburg^{1}	Durban^{1}	Port Elizabeth^{1}
FNB Stadium^{2}^{3}	Moses Mabhida Stadium	Nelson Mandela Bay Stadium
26°14′5.27″S 27°58′56.47″E	29°49′46″S 31°01′49″E	33°56′16″S 25°35′56″E
Capacity: 94,700	Capacity: 54,000^{4}	Capacity: 48,000
2013 Africa Cup of Nations is located in South Africa
Nelspruit		Rustenburg
25°27′42″S 30°55′47″E		25°34′43″S 27°09′39″E
Mbombela Stadium		Royal Bafokeng Stadium
Capacity: 41,000		Capacity: 42,000

- ^1Host city during 1996 African Cup of Nations
- ^2Stadium/site used during 1996 African Cup of Nations
- ^3As "National Stadium"
- ^4Stadium expandable
- ^5All capacities are approximate

=== Training venues ===
Host city	Venues
Durban	Durban Peoples Park, King Zwelithini Stadium, Princess Magogo Stadium
Johannesburg	Dobsonville Stadium, Millpark Stadium, Orlando Stadium, Rand Stadium
Nelspruit	
Port Elizabeth	Gelvandale Stadium, NMMU Stadium, Westbourne Oval, Zwide Stadium
Rustenburg	

== Match ball ==
The official match ball for the 2013 Africa Cup of Nations was manufactured by Adidas and named the Katlego, which means "success" in Tswana language. The name was chosen by African football fans via an online voting competition where it beat alternate names, Khanya (light) and Motswako (mixture).

== Mascot ==
The official mascot of the tournament was Takuma, a hippopotamus wearing sports kit in South Africa's official yellow and green. The mascot was designed by Tumelo Nkoana, a 13-year-old South African student from Hammanskraal in Gauteng.

== Draw ==
The draw for the final tournament took place on 24 October 2012 in Durban. Positions A1 and C1 were already assigned to the hosts (South Africa) and holders (Zambia) respectively. The other 14 qualified teams were ranked based on their performances during the last three Africa Cup of Nations, i.e. the 2008, 2010 and 2012 editions.

Classification	Points awarded
Winner	7
Runner-up	5
Losing semi-finalists	3
Losing quarter-finalists	2
Eliminated in 1st round	1

Moreover, a weighted coefficient on points was given to each of the last three editions of the Africa Cup of Nations as follows:

- 2012 edition: points to be multiplied by 3
- 2010 edition: points to be multiplied by 2
- 2008 edition: points to be multiplied by 1

The teams were then divided into four pots based on the ranking. Each group contained one team from each pot.

Pot 1	Pot 2	Pot 3	Pot 4
South Africa (hosts); Zambia (title holders); Ghana (22 pts); Ivory Coast (22 pts)	Mali (12 pts); Tunisia (10 pts); Angola (9 pts); Nigeria (8 pts)	Algeria (6 pts); Burkina Faso (5 pts); Morocco (4 pts); Niger (3 pts)	Togo (2 pts); Cape Verde (0 pts); DR Congo (0 pts); Ethiopia (0 pts)

== Match officials ==
The following referees were chosen for the 2013 Africa Cup of Nations.

Referees

- (Algeria) Mohamed Benouza
- (Algeria) Djamel Haimoudi
- (Cameroon) Sidi Alioum
- (Ivory Coast) Noumandiez Doué
- (Egypt) Gehad Grisha
- (Gabon) Eric Otogo-Castane
- (The Gambia) Bakary Gassama
- (Kenya) Sylvester Kirwa
- (Madagascar) Hamada Nampiandraza
- (Mali) Koman Coulibaly
- (Mauritania) Ali Lemghaifry
- (Mauritius) Rajindraparsad Seechurn
- (Morocco) Bouchaïb El Ahrach
- (Senegal) Badara Diatta
- (Seychelles) Bernard Camille
- (South Africa) Daniel Bennett
- (Tunisia) Slim Jedidi
- (Zambia) Janny Sikazwe

Assistant referees

- (Algeria) Albdelhak Etchiali
- (Angola) Jerson Emiliano Dos Santos
- (Burundi) Jean-Claude Birumushahu
- (Cameroon) Evarist Menkouande
- (Cameroon) Yanoussa Moussa
- (Ivory Coast) Yéo Songuifolo
- (Eritrea) Angesom Ogbamariam
- (Gabon) Theophile Vinga
- (Ghana) Malik Alidu Salifu
- (Kenya) Marwa Range
- (Mali) Balla Diarra
- (Morocco) Redouane Achik
- (Mozambique) Arsénio Chadreque Marengula
- (Nigeria) Peter Edibe
- (Rwanda) Félicien Kabanda
- (Senegal) Djibril Camara
- (Senegal) El Hadji Malick Samba
- (South Africa) Zakhele Siwela
- (Sudan) Ali Waleed Ahmed
- (Tunisia) Béchir Hassani
- (Tunisia) Anouar Hmila

== Squads ==
Each team could register a squad of 23 players.

== Group stage ==
The schedule of the final tournament was released on 8 September 2012.

Tie-breaking criteria

If two or more teams end the group stage with the same number of points, their ranking is determined by the following criteria:

1. points earned in the matches between the teams concerned;
2. goal difference in the matches between the teams concerned;
3. number of goals scored in the matches between the teams concerned;
4. goal difference in all group matches;
5. number of goals scored in all group matches;
6. fair play points system taking into account the number of yellow and red cards;
7. drawing of lots by the organising committee.

All times South African Standard Time (UTC+2)

=== Group A ===
Pos	Team	Pld	W	D	L	GF	GA	GD	Pts	Qualification
1	South Africa (H)	3	1	2	0	4	2	+2	5	Advance to knockout stage
2	Cape Verde	3	1	2	0	3	2	+1	5	Advance to knockout stage
3	Morocco	3	0	3	0	3	3	0	3	
4	Angola	3	0	1	2	1	4	−3	1	

Source: CAF
(H) Hosts
19 January 2013
18:00

South Africa	0–0	Cape Verde
	Report

Soccer City, Johannesburg
Attendance: 50,000
Referee: Djamel Haimoudi (Algeria)
19 January 2013
21:00

Angola	0–0	Morocco
	Report

Soccer City, Johannesburg
Attendance: 25,000
Referee: Badara Diatta (Senegal)

23 January 2013
17:00

South Africa	2–0	Angola
Sangweni 30'; Majoro 62'	Report

Moses Mabhida Stadium, Durban
Attendance: 40,000
Referee: Koman Coulibaly (Mali)
23 January 2013
20:00

Morocco	1–1	Cape Verde
El-Arabi 78'	Report	Platini 35'

Moses Mabhida Stadium, Durban
Attendance: 25,000
Referee: Janny Sikazwe (Zambia)

27 January 2013
19:00

Morocco	2–2	South Africa
El Adoua 10'; Hafidi 82'	Report	Mahlangu 71'; Sangweni 86'

Moses Mabhida Stadium, Durban
Attendance: 45,000
Referee: Bakary Gassama (Gambia)
27 January 2013
19:00

Cape Verde	2–1	Angola
F. Varela 81'; Héldon 90+1'	Report	Nando 33' (o.g.)

Nelson Mandela Bay Stadium, Port Elizabeth
Attendance: 20,000
Referee: Slim Jedidi (Tunisia)

=== Group B ===
Pos	Team	Pld	W	D	L	GF	GA	GD	Pts	Qualification
1	Ghana	3	2	1	0	6	2	+4	7	Advance to knockout stage
2	Mali	3	1	1	1	2	2	0	4	Advance to knockout stage
3	DR Congo	3	0	3	0	3	3	0	3	
4	Niger	3	0	1	2	0	4	−4	1	

Source: CAF
20 January 2013
17:00

Ghana	2–2	DR Congo
Agyemang-Badu 40'; Asamoah 49'	Report	Mputu 53'; Mbokani 69' (pen.)

Nelson Mandela Bay Stadium, Port Elizabeth
Attendance: 7,000
Referee: Daniel Bennett (South Africa)
20 January 2013
20:00

Mali	1–0	Niger
Keita 84'	Report

Nelson Mandela Bay Stadium, Port Elizabeth
Attendance: 20,000
Referee: Slim Jedidi (Tunisia)

24 January 2013
17:00

Ghana	1–0	Mali
Wakaso 38' (pen.)	Report

Nelson Mandela Bay Stadium, Port Elizabeth
Attendance: 8,000
Referee: Noumandiez Doué (Ivory Coast)
24 January 2013
20:00

Niger	0–0	DR Congo
	Report

Nelson Mandela Bay Stadium, Port Elizabeth
Attendance: 12,000
Referee: Bouchaïb El Ahrach (Morocco)

28 January 2013
19:00

Niger	0–3	Ghana
	Report	Gyan 6'; Atsu 23'; Boye 49'

Nelson Mandela Bay Stadium, Port Elizabeth
Attendance: 10,000
Referee: Badara Diatta (Senegal)
28 January 2013
19:00

DR Congo	1–1	Mali
Mbokani 3' (pen.)	Report	Mah. Samassa 15'

Moses Mabhida Stadium, Durban
Attendance: 8,000
Referee: Djamel Haimoudi (Algeria)

=== Group C ===
Pos	Team	Pld	W	D	L	GF	GA	GD	Pts	Qualification
1	Burkina Faso	3	1	2	0	5	1	+4	5	Advance to knockout stage
2	Nigeria	3	1	2	0	4	2	+2	5	Advance to knockout stage
3	Zambia	3	0	3	0	2	2	0	3	
4	Ethiopia	3	0	1	2	1	7	−6	1	

Source: CAF
21 January 2013
17:00
Round 1

Zambia	1–1	Ethiopia
Mbesuma 45+3'	Report	Adane 65'

Mbombela Stadium, Nelspruit
Attendance: 10,000
Referee: Eric Otogo-Castane (Gabon)
21 January 2013
20:00

Nigeria	1–1	Burkina Faso
Emenike 23'	Report	Al. Traoré 90+4'

Mbombela Stadium, Nelspruit
Attendance: 8,500
Referee: Mohamed Benouza (Algeria)

25 January 2013
17:00

Zambia	1–1	Nigeria
Mweene 85' (pen.)	Report	Emenike 57'

Mbombela Stadium, Nelspruit
Attendance: 25,000
Referee: Gehad Grisha (Egypt)
25 January 2013
20:00

Burkina Faso	4–0	Ethiopia
Al. Traoré 34', 74'; D. Koné 79'; Pitroipa 90+5'	Report

Mbombela Stadium, Nelspruit
Attendance: 35,000
Referee: Bernard Camille (Seychelles)

29 January 2013
19:00

Burkina Faso	0–0	Zambia
	Report

Mbombela Stadium, Nelspruit
Attendance: 8,000
Referee: Sidi Alioum (Cameroon)
29 January 2013
19:00

Ethiopia	0–2	Nigeria
	Report	Moses 80' (pen.), 90' (pen.)

Royal Bafokeng Stadium, Rustenburg
Attendance: 15,000
Referee: Bouchaïb El Ahrach (Morocco)

=== Group D ===
Pos	Team	Pld	W	D	L	GF	GA	GD	Pts	Qualification
1	Ivory Coast	3	2	1	0	7	3	+4	7	Advance to knockout stage
2	Togo	3	1	1	1	4	3	+1	4	Advance to knockout stage
3	Tunisia	3	1	1	1	2	4	−2	4	
4	Algeria	3	0	1	2	2	5	−3	1	

Source: CAF
22 January 2013
17:00

Ivory Coast	2–1	Togo
Y. Touré 8'; Gervinho 88'	Report	J. Ayité 45+2'

Royal Bafokeng Stadium, Rustenburg
Attendance: 2,000
Referee: Sidi Alioum (Cameroon)
22 January 2013
20:00

Tunisia	1–0	Algeria
Msakni 90+1'	Report

Royal Bafokeng Stadium, Rustenburg
Attendance: 10,000
Referee: Bakary Gassama (Gambia)

26 January 2013
17:00

Ivory Coast	3–0	Tunisia
Gervinho 21'; Y. Touré 87'; Ya Konan 90'	Report

Royal Bafokeng Stadium, Rustenburg
Attendance: 20,000
Referee: Rajindraparsad Seechurn (Mauritius)
26 January 2013
20:00

Algeria	0–2	Togo
	Report	Adebayor 31'; Womé 90+5'

Royal Bafokeng Stadium, Rustenburg
Attendance: 35,000
Referee: Hamada Nampiandraza (Madagascar)

30 January 2013
19:00

Algeria	2–2	Ivory Coast
Feghouli 64' (pen.); Soudani 70'	Report	Drogba 77'; Bony 81'

Royal Bafokeng Stadium, Rustenburg
Attendance: 5,000
Referee: Eric Otogo-Castane (Gabon)
30 January 2013
19:00

Togo	1–1	Tunisia
Gakpé 13'	Report	Mouelhi 30' (pen.)

Mbombela Stadium, Nelspruit
Attendance: 7,500
Referee: Daniel Bennett (South Africa)

== Knockout phase ==
In the knockout stage, if a match was level at the end of normal playing time, extra time was played (two periods of 15 minutes each) and followed, if necessary, by a penalty shoot-out to determine the winner, except for the play-off for third place, where no extra time would be played.

=== Bracket ===
Quarter-finals
2 February – Durban
South Africa	1 (1)
Mali (p)	1 (3)
3 February – Rustenburg
Ivory Coast	1
Nigeria	2
3 February – Nelspruit
Burkina Faso (a.e.t.)	1
Togo	0
2 February – Port Elizabeth
Ghana	2
Cape Verde	0

Semi-finals
6 February – Durban
Mali	1
Nigeria	4
6 February – Nelspruit
Burkina Faso (p)	1 (3)
Ghana	1 (2)

Final
10 February – Johannesburg
Nigeria	1
Burkina Faso	0
Third place play-off
9 February – Port Elizabeth
Mali	3
Ghana	1

=== Quarter-finals ===
2 February 2013
17:00

Ghana	2–0	Cape Verde
Wakaso 54' (pen.), 90+5'	Report

Nelson Mandela Bay Stadium, Port Elizabeth
Attendance: 8,000
Referee: Rajindraparsad Seechurn (Mauritius)

2 February 2013
20:30

South Africa	1–1 (a.e.t.)	Mali
Rantie 31'	Report	Keita 58'
Penalties
Tshabalala (penalty scored); Furman (penalty missed); Mahlangu (penalty missed); Majoro (penalty missed)	1–3	(penalty scored) Diabaté; (penalty scored) Tamboura; (penalty scored) Ma. Traoré

Moses Mabhida Stadium, Durban
Attendance: 45,000
Referee: Néant Alioum (Cameroon)

3 February 2013
17:00

Ivory Coast	1–2	Nigeria
Tioté 50'	Report	Emenike 43'; Mba 78'

Royal Bafokeng Stadium, Rustenburg
Attendance: 25,000
Referee: Djamel Haimoudi (Algeria)

3 February 2013
20:30

Burkina Faso	1–0 (a.e.t.)	Togo
Pitroipa 105'	Report

Mbombela Stadium, Nelspruit
Attendance: 27,000
Referee: Badara Diatta (Senegal)

=== Semi-finals ===
6 February 2013
17:00

Mali	1–4	Nigeria
C. Diarra 75'	Report	Echiéjilé 25'; Ideye 30'; Emenike 44'; Musa 60'

Moses Mabhida Stadium, Durban
Attendance: 54,000
Referee: Bakary Gassama (Gambia)

6 February 2013
20:30

Burkina Faso	1–1 (a.e.t.)	Ghana
Bancé 60'	Report	Wakaso 13' (pen.)
Penalties
B. Koné (penalty scored); H. Traoré (penalty scored); Paul Koulibaly (penalty missed); Bancé (penalty scored)	3–2	(penalty missed) Vorsah; (penalty scored) Atsu; (penalty scored) Afful; (penalty missed) Clottey; (penalty missed) Agyemang-Badu

Mbombela Stadium, Nelspruit
Attendance: 35,000
Referee: Slim Jedidi (Tunisia)

=== Third place play-off ===
9 February 2013
20:00

Mali	3–1	Ghana
Mah. Samassa 21'; Keita 48'; S. Diarra 90+4'	Report	Asamoah 82'

Nelson Mandela Bay Stadium, Port Elizabeth
Attendance: 6,000
Referee: Eric Otogo-Castane (Gabon)

=== Final ===
10 February 2013
20:30 SAST

Nigeria	1–0	Burkina Faso
Mba 40'	Report

FNB Stadium, Johannesburg
Attendance: 85,000
Referee: Djamel Haimoudi (Algeria)

== Awards ==
The following awards were given for the tournament:

Orange Player of the Tournament

- (Burkina Faso) Jonathan Pitroipa

Pepsi Tournament Top Scorer

- (Nigeria) Emmanuel Emenike

Player name	Games played	Goals scored	Assists	Minutes played	Source
(Nigeria) Emmanuel Emenike	5	4	3	403	
(Ghana) Mubarak Wakaso	5	4 (3 penalties)	0	396	

Samsung Fair Player of the Tournament

- (Nigeria) Victor Moses

Nissan Goal of the tournament

- (Tunisia) Youssef Msakni vs. Algeria

Team of the Tournament

Goalkeeper	Defenders	Midfielders	Forwards
(Nigeria) Vincent Enyeama	(Burkina Faso) Bakary Koné (Cape Verde) Nando (Ivory Coast) Siaka Tiéné (Nigeria) Efe Ambrose	(Burkina Faso) Jonathan Pitroipa (Mali) Seydou Keita (Nigeria) Mikel John Obi (Nigeria) Victor Moses	(Ghana) Asamoah Gyan (Nigeria) Emmanuel Emenike

=== Tournament rankings ===
Ranking criteria
For teams eliminated in the same knockout round, the following criteria are applied, in the order given, to determine the final rankings:
1. Goal difference in round eliminated;
2. Goals scored in round eliminated;
3. If teams eliminated in the semi-finals or quarter-finals are tied, the above criteria are reapplied for the previous knockout round, with this process repeated once more should two semi-finalists remain tied;
4. Points in group stage;
5. Goal difference in group stage;
6. Goals scored in group stage;
7. Disciplinary points.

For teams eliminated in the group stage, the following criteria are applied, in the order given, to determine the final rankings:

1. Position in group;
2. Points;
3. Goal difference;
4. Goals scored;
5. Disciplinary points.

Pos.	Team	G	Pld	W	D	L	Pts	GF	GA	GD
1	Nigeria	C	6	4	2	0	14	11	4	+7
2	Burkina Faso	C	6	2	3	1	9	7	3	+4
3	Mali	B	6	2	2	2	8	7	8	−1
4	Ghana	B	6	3	2	1	11	10	6	+4
Eliminated in the quarter-finals
5	South Africa	A	4	1	3	0	6	5	3	+2
6	Ivory Coast	D	4	2	1	1	7	8	5	+3
7	Togo	D	4	1	1	2	4	4	4	0
8	Cape Verde	A	4	1	2	1	5	3	4	−1
Eliminated in the group stage
9	Tunisia	D	3	1	1	1	4	2	4	−2
10	Morocco	A	3	0	3	0	3	3	3	0
11	DR Congo	B	3	0	3	0	3	3	3	0
12	Zambia	C	3	0	3	0	3	2	2	0
13	Algeria	D	3	0	1	2	1	2	5	−3
14	Angola	A	3	0	1	2	1	1	4	−3
15	Niger	B	3	0	1	2	1	0	4	−4
16	Ethiopia	C	3	0	1	2	1	1	7	−6

== Goalscorers ==
4 goals

- (Nigeria) Emmanuel Emenike
- (Ghana) Mubarak Wakaso

3 goals

- (Burkina Faso) Alain Traoré
- (Mali) Seydou Keita

2 goals

- (Burkina Faso) Jonathan Pitroipa
- (Democratic Republic of the Congo) Dieumerci Mbokani
- (Ghana) Kwadwo Asamoah
- (Ivory Coast) Gervinho
- (Ivory Coast) Yaya Touré
- (Mali) Mahamadou Samassa
- (Nigeria) Sunday Mba
- (Nigeria) Victor Moses
- (South Africa) Siyabonga Sangweni

1 goal

- (Algeria) Sofiane Feghouli
- (Algeria) Hillal Soudani
- (Burkina Faso) Aristide Bancé
- (Burkina Faso) Djakaridja Koné
- (Cape Verde) Platini
- (Cape Verde) Héldon Ramos
- (Cape Verde) Fernando Varela
- (Democratic Republic of the Congo) Trésor Mputu
- (Ethiopia) Adane Girma
- (Ghana) Emmanuel Agyemang-Badu
- (Ghana) Christian Atsu Twasam
- (Ghana) John Boye
- (Ghana) Asamoah Gyan
- (Ivory Coast) Wilfried Bony
- (Ivory Coast) Didier Drogba
- (Ivory Coast) Cheick Tioté
- (Ivory Coast) Didier Ya Konan
- (Mali) Cheick Fantamady Diarra
- (Mali) Sigamary Diarra
- (Morocco) Issam El Adoua
- (Morocco) Youssef El-Arabi
- (Morocco) Abdelilah Hafidi
- (Nigeria) Uwa Elderson Echiéjilé
- (Nigeria) Brown Ideye
- (Nigeria) Ahmed Musa
- (South Africa) May Mahlangu
- (South Africa) Lehlohonolo Majoro
- (South Africa) Tokelo Rantie
- (Togo) Emmanuel Adebayor
- (Togo) Jonathan Ayité
- (Togo) Serge Gakpé
- (Togo) Dové Wome
- (Tunisia) Khaled Mouelhi
- (Tunisia) Youssef Msakni
- (Zambia) Collins Mbesuma
- (Zambia) Kennedy Mweene

Own goals

- (Cape Verde) Nando (playing against Angola)

== Discipline ==
A player was automatically suspended for the next match for the following offences:

- Receiving a red card (red card suspensions could be extended for serious offences)
- Receiving two yellow cards in two matches
- After the end of the group matches, all cautions received were cancelled for the rest of the competition. Nevertheless, a player having collected two yellow cards sustained the one match suspension.

The following suspensions occurred during the tournament:

Player(s)/Official(s)	Offence(s)	Suspension(s)
Group stage suspensions
(Ethiopia) Jemal Tassew	(red card) in Group C vs Zambia (matchday 1; 21 January 2013)	Group C vs Burkina Faso (matchday 2; 25 January 2013); Group C vs Nigeria (matchday 3; 29 January 2013)
(Nigeria) Efe Ambrose	(yellow card) (yellow-red card) in Group C vs Burkina Faso (matchday 1; 21 January 2013)	Group C vs Zambia (matchday 2; 25 January 2013)
(Morocco) Younès Belhanda	(yellow card) in Group A vs Angola (matchday 1; 19 January 2013); (yellow card) in Group A vs Cape Verde (matchday 2; 23 January 2013)	Group A vs South Africa (matchday 3; 27 January 2013)
(Ghana) Mubarak Wakaso	(yellow card) in Group B vs DR Congo (matchday 1; 20 January 2013); (yellow card) in Group B vs Mali (matchday 2; 24 January 2013)	Group B vs Niger (matchday 3; 28 January 2013)
(Burkina Faso) Abdoulaye Soulama	(red card) in Group C vs Ethiopia (matchday 2; 25 January 2013)	Group C vs Zambia (matchday 3; 29 January 2013)
Knockout stage suspensions
(South Africa) Anele Ngcongca	(yellow card) in Group A vs Cape Verde (matchday 1; 19 January 2013); (yellow card) in Group A vs Morocco (matchday 3; 27 January 2013)	Quarter-finals vs Mali (2 February 2013)
(Mali) Mamadou Samassa	(yellow card) in Group B vs Niger (matchday 1; 20 January 2013); (yellow card) in Group B vs DR Congo (matchday 3; 28 January 2013)	Quarter-finals vs South Africa (2 February 2013)
(Ethiopia) Sisay Bancha	(yellow card) (yellow-red card) in Group C vs Nigeria (matchday 3; 29 January 2013)	Suspension served outside tournament
(Togo) Daré Nibombé	(yellow card) in Group D vs Ivory Coast (matchday 1; 22 January 2013); (yellow card) in Group D vs Tunisia (matchday 3; 30 January 2013)	Quarter-finals vs Burkina Faso (3 February 2013)
(Togo) Jonathan Ayité	(yellow card) in Group D vs Algeria (matchday 2; 26 January 2013); (yellow card) in Group D vs Tunisia (matchday 3; 30 January 2013)	Quarter-finals vs Burkina Faso (3 February 2013)
(Mali) Samba Sow	(yellow card) in Quarter-finals vs South Africa (2 February 2013); (yellow card) in Semi-finals vs Nigeria (6 February 2013)	Third place play-off vs Ghana (9 February 2013)
(Ghana) Mohammed Rabiu	(yellow card) in Quarter-finals vs Cape Verde (2 February 2013); (yellow card) in Semi-finals vs Burkina Faso (6 February 2013)	Third place play-off vs Mali (9 February 2013)
(Burkina Faso) Jonathan Pitroipa	(yellow card) (yellow-red card) in Semi-finals vs Ghana (6 February 2013)	Ban cancelled

== Marketing ==
=== Sponsorship ===
- Orange
- Standard Bank
- Pepsi
- Samsung
- Nissan
- Ifd Kapital
- Doritos
- Adidas

== Media ==
South African public broadcaster SABC was the host broadcaster of the tournament. It paid R65 million (US$7.5 million) for the rights, which entitle it to transmit all of the games across its radio and television platforms.

=== Broadcasting ===
Territory	Broadcaster	Ref
Albania	SuperSport	
Australia	Eurosport	
Botswana	Botswana TV	
Brazil	SporTV	
Cape Verde	RTC	
Europe^{1}	Eurosport	
France	Canal+	
Ghana	GTV	
Hong Kong	Now TV	
Ireland	ITV4, British Eurosport	
Israel	Eurosport	
Malaysia	Media Prima	
MENA	Al Jazeera	
Romania	Romanian Eurosport	
Russia	Russian Eurosport	
South Africa	SABC	
Sub-Saharan Africa	SuperSport	
Thailand	CH7	
United Kingdom	ITV4, British Eurosport	
South America^{2}	DirecTV	
United States	ESPN	

^1 – Excluding France.
^2 – Excluding Bolivia, Brazil, Guyana, Paraguay and Suriname.
