= Anele Ngcongca =

South African footballer (1987–2020)

- Ngcongca with Genk in 2013

Personal information
- Full name: Calvin Anele Ngcongca
- Date of birth: 21 October 1987
- Place of birth: Cape Town, South Africa
- Date of death: 23 November 2020 (aged 33)
- Place of death: KwaZulu-Natal, South Africa
- Height: 1.80 m (5 ft 11 in)
- Position: Right back

Youth career
- Aces United
- FC Fortune

Senior career*
Years	Team	Apps	(Gls)
2003–2007	FC Fortune	60	(5)
2007–2016	Genk	223	(8)
2015–2016	→ Troyes (loan)	20	(0)
2016–2020	Mamelodi Sundowns	61	(1)
2020	→ AmaZulu (loan)	0	(0)
Total		364	(14)

International career
2009–2016	South Africa	53	(0)
- * Club domestic league appearances and goals

Calvin Anele Ngcongca (21 October 1987 – 23 November 2020) was a South African professional soccer player who played as a right back.

== Career ==
On 29 August 2015, Ngcongca joined ES Troyes AC on a season-long loan from Genk after being relegated to the bench by his head coach.

On 23 November 2020, Anele Ngcongca died in a car accident on the N2 highway in KwaZulu-Natal. He played for AmaZulu before his death.

== Honours ==
Genk

- Belgian Cup: 2008–09, 2012–13
- Belgian Pro League: 2010–11
- Belgian Super Cup: 2011

Mamelodi Sundowns

- PSL: 2017–18, 2018–19, 2019–20
- Nedbank Cup: 2019–20
- Telkom Knockout: 2019
