= Moses Mabhida Stadium =

Football stadium in Durban, South Africa

- Stone Arch To Freedom
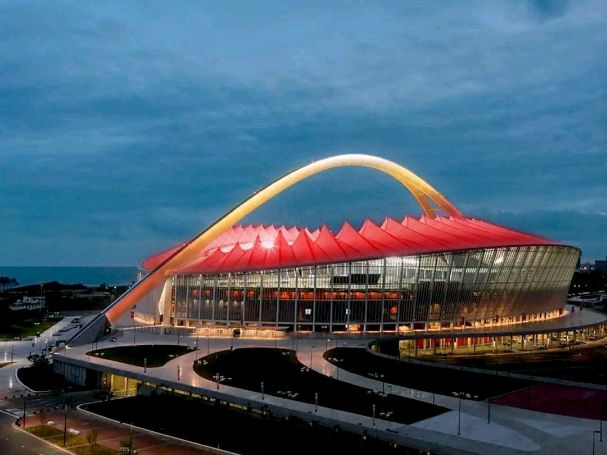
- The aerial view of the stadium
- Interactive map of Moses Mabhida Stadium
- Full name: Moses Mabhida Stadium
- Location: 44 Walter Gilbert Road, Stamford Hill, Durban, South Africa
- Coordinates: 29°49′44″S 31°01′49″E
- Owner: eThekwini (Durban Metropolitan UniCity)
- Capacity: 55,500
- Surface: Grass
- Field size: Stadium: 320 m × 280 m × 45 m (1,050 ft × 919 ft × 148 ft), Arches: 100 m (330 ft)

Construction
- Groundbreaking: 2006; 20 years ago
- Built: 2007–2009
- Opened: 28 November 2009; 16 years ago
- Cost: R 3.4 billion (US$450 million)
- Architects: Gerkan, Marg and Partners Theunissen Jankowitz Durban, Ambro-Afrique Consultants, Osmond Lange Architects & Planners, NSM Designs
- Builders: Group5 WBHO A. Yudishtra and Philasande Project Managers

Tenants
- AmaZulu F.C. (2009–present); Sharks (some matches); South Africa national soccer team

Website
- www.mmstadium.com

The Moses Mabhida Stadium is a soccer stadium in Durban in the KwaZulu-Natal province of South Africa, named after Moses Mabhida, a former general secretary of the South African Communist Party. A multi-use stadium, it became a venue for several events, like bungee jumping, concerts, cricket, soccer, golf practice, motorsports and rugby union.

It was one of the host stadiums for the 2010 FIFA World Cup. The stadium has a capacity of 55,500 (expandable up to 75,000). The stadium is adjacent to the Kings Park Stadium, in the Kings Park Sporting Precinct, and the Durban street circuit used for the A1GP World Cup of Motorsport. It includes a sports institute, and a transmodal transport station.

== History ==
The stadium is located on the grounds of the former Kings Park Soccer Stadium; in the Durban sports precinct in the suburb of Stamford Hill. The stadium had the capacity to hold 62,760 spectators during the 2010 FIFA World Cup. Its design allows the stadium seating to be adjusted; 55,500 for local matches or up to 75,000 for events such as the Commonwealth Games. It has two permanent tiers of seating, a temporary third one was added for the World Cup.

There are 120 corporate hospitality suites with 7,500 seats.

=== Dimensions ===
Stadium: 320m×280m×45m

==== Arch ====
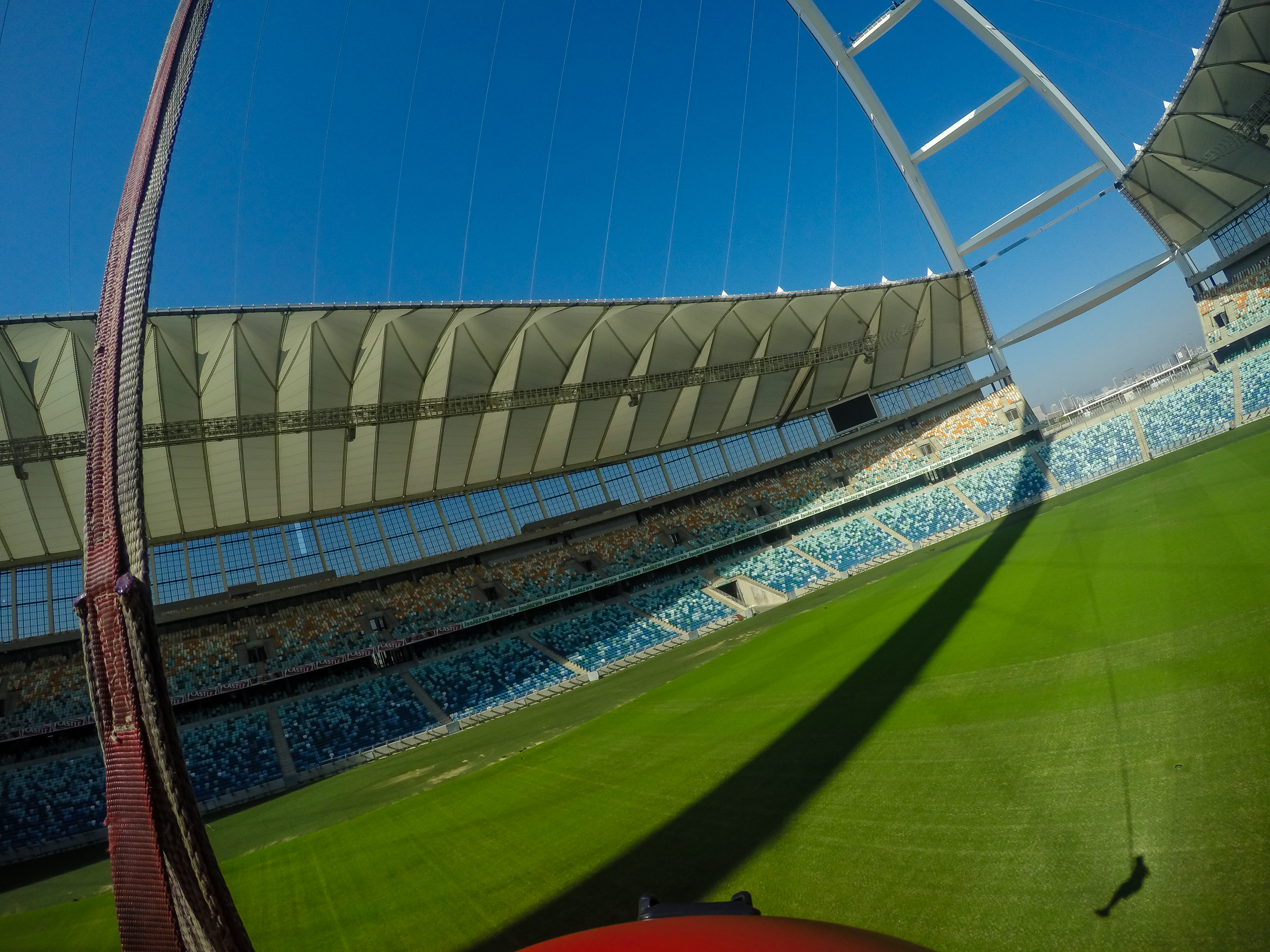
View of the arch from the bottom of the swing.

Somewhat reminiscent of the famous Wembley Stadium arch, a 350-metre (1,148 ft) long free and 105-metre (344 ft) high span arch holds up the roof of the stadium, the top of the arch rises to 106 metres (348 ft) above the pitch. The arch also represents the once divided nation coming together, inspired by the South African Flag. The arch consists of a 5×5m steel hollow box and weighs 2,600 tonnes. A funicular carries visitors from the north side of the stadium to a viewing platform at the top of the arch, offering a view over city and ocean. The south side features a 550-step adventure walk. On 24 February 2010 the world's largest swing opened at the stadium. The swing allows clients to jump off the 4th ladder rung and fall toward the pitch before being swung out in a 220-metre (720 ft) arc over the pitch.

Moses Mabhida Stadium view

==== Roof ====
The Moses Mabhida Stadium roof consists of a 46,000 m^{2} (500,000 sq ft), Teflon-coated, glass-fibre membrane which produce a translucent glow when the stadium is lit. These are attached to the arch by 95mm diameter steel cables. The roof covers 88% of the seats.

==== Bowl ====
Around the perimeter, 1,750 columns and 216 raking beams provides the main support. Around the field, 900m of retaining walls stretches 8m high. A total of 1,780 pre-cast concrete seating panels creates the bowl form. There are over 80,000 square metres (860,000 sq ft) of floor space within the stadium structure.

==== Façade ====
Over 100 columns surround the stadium. The height of the columns varies around the stadium, but the highest is 46m. In total 15,000 square metres (160,000 sq ft) of façade surround the stadium. A total of 550 aluminium fins fit between the main columns. Perforated metal sheeting was placed between the aluminium fins, where required.

=== Completion ===
Construction of the stadium was officially completed on 24 November 2009 and the first official match played there was between Amazulu and Maritzburg United on 29 November, with Maritzburg United winning 1–0.

== Major events ==
Stadium at sunset

In December 2015, gospel ensemble Joyous Celebration recorded their first outdoor recording for Joyous Celebration 20 at the Moses Mabhida Stadium.

=== 2022 Commonwealth Games ===
The stadium had been scheduled to host the opening ceremony and athletics events of the 2022 Commonwealth Games, which was awarded to Durban in 2015, however the Commonwealth Games Federation withdrew hosting rights in 2017 due to funding concerns.

== Tournament results ==
=== 2010 FIFA World Cup ===
The stadium was one of the venues for the 2010 FIFA World Cup and hosted five group games, one round game and a semi-final match. During the World Cup, the stadium was referred to "Durban Stadium".

Date	Time (UTC+2)	Team No. 1	Result	Team No. 2	Round	Attendance
13 June 2010	20:30	Germany	4–0	Australia	Group D	62,660
16 June 2010	16:00	Spain	0–1	Switzerland	Group H	62,453
19 June 2010	13:30	Netherlands	1–0	Japan	Group E	62,010
22 June 2010	20:30	Nigeria	2–2	South Korea	Group B	61,874
25 June 2010	16:00	Portugal	0–0	Brazil	Group G	62,712
28 June 2010	16:00	Netherlands	2–1	Slovakia	Round of 16	61,962
7 July 2010	20:30	Germany	0–1	Spain	Semi-finals	60,960

=== 2013 African Cup of Nations ===
Moses Mabhida Stadium served as one of the venues for the 2013 African Cup of Nations. It hosted 4 group games, 1 quarter final and a semi final. The games were:

Date	Team No. 1	Result	Team No. 2	Round	Attendance
23 January 2013	South Africa	2–0	Angola	Group A	50,000
23 January 2013	Cape Verde	1–1	Morocco	Group A	25,000
27 January 2013	Morocco	2–2	South Africa	Group A	45,000
28 January 2013	DR Congo	1–1	Mali	Group B	8,000
2 February 2013	South Africa	1–1 (a.e.t) (1–3 pen.)	Mali	Quarter-final	45,000
6 February 2013	Mali	1–4	Nigeria	Semi-final	54,000

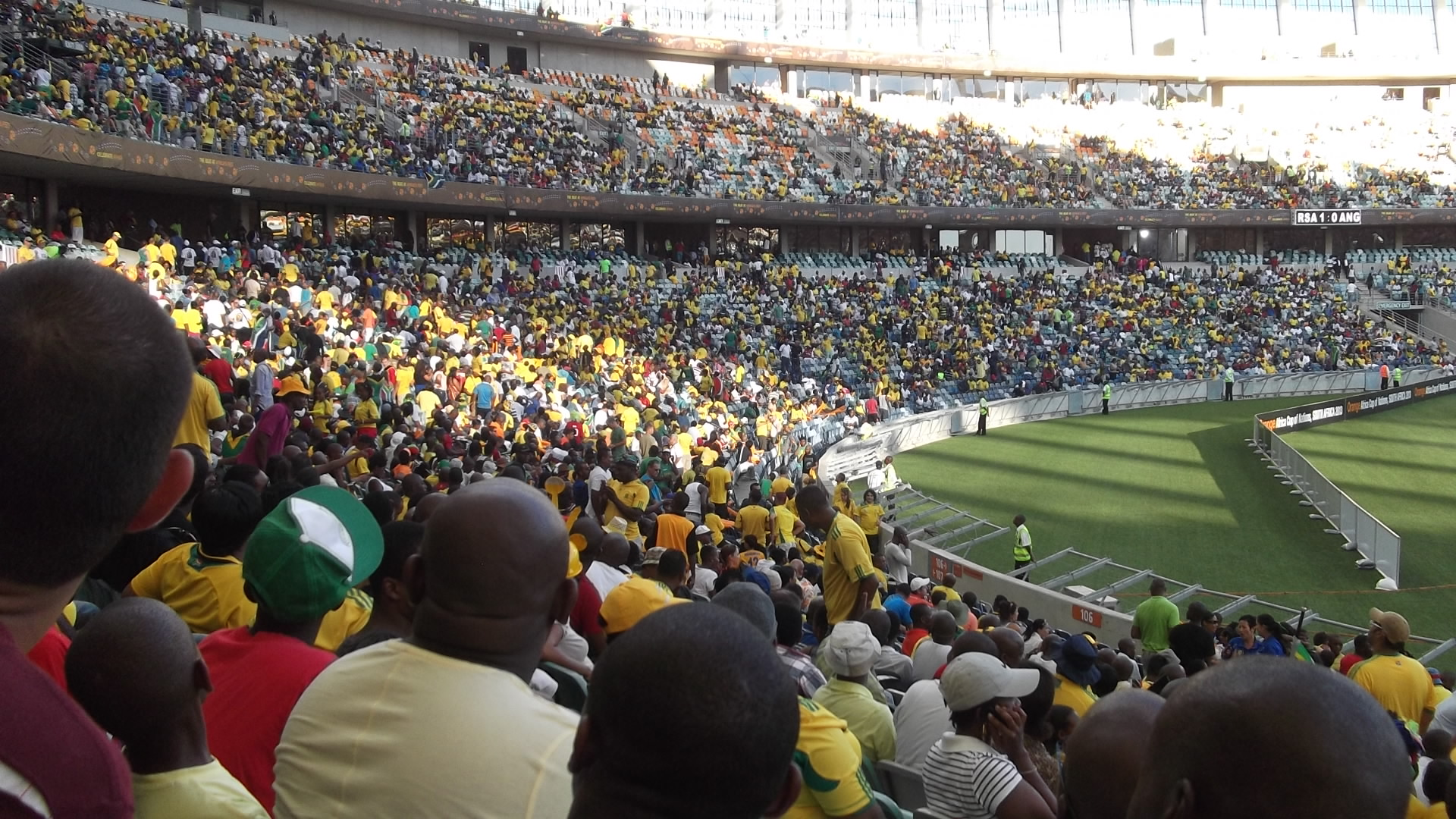
Moses Mabhida Stadium during 2013 Africa Cup of Nations.

== Soccer ==
The stadium is the current home ground of Premiership team AmaZulu. It hosted seven matches during the 2010 FIFA World Cup, and frequently hosts cup finals (19 finals since 2010 as of May 2025).

== Cricket ==
=== Cricket ===
Moses Mabhida Stadium
- Interactive map of Moses Mabhida Stadium

Ground information
- Location: Durban, South Africa
- Country: South Africa

International information
- Only men's T20I: 9 January 2011: South Africa v India
- As of 27 December 2016; Source: Cricinfo

A single T20I match has been hosted at Moses Mabhida Stadium.

Team (A)	Team (B)	Winner	Margin	Year	Attendance
South Africa	India	India	By 21 runs	2011	55,500

The stadium hosted a Twenty20 cricket match between South Africa and India on 9 January 2011. The match was played for the Krish Mackerdhuj Trophy, which India won by 21 runs. The stadium witnessed the biggest ever crowd for a cricket match on the African continent which was followed by a concert to celebrate South Africa-India ties.

== Royalty ==
On October 29, 2022, the coronation of new appointed King Misuzulu took place at Moses Mabhida Stadium. This was the first to take place after Apartheid had ended.

== Concerts and events ==
Event/Artist	Tour	Date
Top Gear Festival	Top Gear Festival Durban	16–17 June 2012
Chris Brown	Carpe Diem Tour	17 December 2012
Top Gear Festival	Top Gear Festival Durban	15–16 June 2013
Nitro Circus	Nitro Circus Live	19 February 2014
Top Gear Festival	Top Gear Festival Durban	21–22 June 2014
Lionel Richie	All The Hits All Night Long South African Tour	13 March 2016
Nicki Minaj	The Pinkprint Tour	20 March 2016
Mariah Carey	The Sweet Sweet Fantasy Tour	29 April 2016
Nitro Circus	Nitro Circus Live	25 October 2017
John Legend	Darkness and Light Tour	7 November 2017
Cassper Nyovest	Fill Up	1 December 2018
Khuzani	#Gcwalisaimabhida	30 March 2019
Monster Jam	Monster Jam	6 May 2023

== Future ==
The Moses Mabhida Stadium in Durban is planned to undergo a R236 million upgrade to enhance its appeal and functionality. The revamp includes a new Sky Car with an accessible cabin, increased wind tolerance, and a larger viewing platform with a glass "Air Walk." Other attractions include a new Big Swing, sea-facing bungee jump, a zip line ending at People’s Park, and dramatic views from a Compression Ring Walk. These upgrades aim to boost the stadium's commercial viability, structural integrity, and visitor safety . These plans were revealed by eThekwini Metropolitan Municipality Mayor Cyril Xaba. Construction is planned to start soon.
