= Deaths in March 2005 =

The following is a list of notable deaths in March 2005.

Entries for each day are listed alphabetically by surname. A typical entry lists information in the following sequence:

- Name, age, country of citizenship at birth, subsequent country of citizenship (if applicable), reason for notability, cause of death (if known), and reference.

== March 2005 ==
=== 1 ===
- Cissy van Bennekom, 93, Dutch film actress.
- Harold Culbert, 60, Canadian politician, member of the House of Commons of Canada (1993-1997).
- Reverend Walter Halloran, 83, American priest who participated in the exorcism on which The Exorcist was based.
- Henry Johannessen, 81, Norwegian football player and Olympian (1952).
- Brian Luckhurst, 66, English cricketer, cancer.
- Peter Malkin, 77, Israeli Mossad agent, the man who captured Adolf Eichmann.
- Bob Mavis, 86, American baseball player (Detroit Tigers), and manager.
- Holger Nurmela, 84, Swedish ice hockey, football and bandy player, manager, and Olympian (1948, 1952, 1956).
- Robert G. Renner, 81, American district judge (United States District Court for the District of Minnesota).
- Jiří Trnka, 78, Czechoslovak football player.

=== 2 ===
- Martin Denny, 93, American founder of exotica musical genre, bandleader.
- Hermann Dörnemann, 111, German supercentenarian and World War I veteran, heart failure.
- Tillie K. Fowler, 62, American politician, four-term Florida congresswoman.
- Elmar Huseynov, 37, Azerbaijani journalist, homicide.
- Viktor Kapitonov, 71, Russian road cyclist and Olympian (1956, 1960).
- Juan Koscina, 58, Chilean footballer.
- Rick Mahler, 51, American baseball pitcher (Atlanta Braves, Cincinnati Reds, Montreal Expos), heart attack.
- Mario Moreno, 69, Chilean football player, cancer.
- Corrado Pani, 68, Italian actor and voice actor, cancer.

=== 3 ===
- Åke Andersson, 79, Swedish Olympic long-distance runner (1952).
- George Atkinson, 69, American businessman, inventor of the video rental.
- James Corbett, 98, Australian politician.
- Max Fisher, 96, American millionaire philanthropist, listed in Forbes 400.
- Rinus Michels, 77, Dutch football player and coach, former Netherlands national football team coach.
- Raveendran, 61, Indian composer and playback singer, lung cancer.
- Guylaine St-Onge, 39, Canadian actress (Earth: Final Conflict, Fast Track, Angel Eyes), cancer.
- Arthur E. Tokle, 82, Norwegian-born American ski jumper and Olympian (1952).

=== 4 ===
- Mihai Brediceanu, 84, Romanian musician.
- Nicola Calipari, 51, Italian intelligence officer, shot by the US Army in Iraq.
- Jan Kasper, 72, Czech Olympic ice hockey player (1956, 1960).
- Yuriy Kravchenko, 53, Ukrainian statesman, former interior minister of Ukraine, suicide by gunshot.
- Buck McPhail, 75, American football player (Oklahoma Sooners, Baltimore Colts).
- Tony Romano, 89, American jazz guitarist and singer.
- Carlos Sherman, 70, Uruguayan-born Belarusian translator and writer.

=== 5 ===
- George Worsley Adamson, 92, American-born British illustrator.
- Sergiu Comissiona, 76, Romanian orchestra conductor, heart attack.
- Morris Engel, 86, American photographer, cinematographer and filmmaker.
- Vance Gerry, 75, American animator and screenwriter (The Aristocats, Hercules, The Fox and the Hound), cancer.
- James McGirr Kelly, 76, American district judge (United States District Court for the Eastern District of Pennsylvania).
- Hans-Werner Seher, 75, German Olympic water polo player (1956).
- David Sheppard, 75, English cricketer and Church of England bishop, cancer.
- Leo Winters, 82, American lawyer and the 11th State treasurer for the American state of Oklahoma.

=== 6 ===
- Larned B. Asprey, 85, American chemist.
- Hans Bethe, 98, German-born American Nobel Laureate in Physics, discover of stellar fusion.
- Danny Gardella, 85, American baseball player (New York Giants, St. Louis Cardinals), heart attack.
- Hans von der Groeben, 97, German diplomat, lawyer and journalist.
- Jean Löring, 70, German footballer.
- Russ Marin, 70, American film and television actor.
- Gladys Marín, 63, Chilean communist politician, cancer.
- Josef Matz, 79, Austrian Olympic field hockey player (1952).
- Chuck Thompson, 83, American Baltimore Orioles broadcaster, complications following a stroke.
- Tommy Vance, 64, British radio DJ and TV host, stroke.
- Sandy Ward, 78, American film and television actor.
- Teresa Wright, 86, American actress (Mrs. Miniver, Shadow of a Doubt, The Best Years of Our Lives), heart attack.

=== 7 ===
- Walter Arendt, 80, German politician.
- John Box, 85, British production designer (Lawrence of Arabia, Doctor Zhivago, Oliver!), 4-time Oscar winner.
- Terry Buck, 61, Australian Olympic swimmer (1964), and coach.
- Willis Hall, 75, English playwright and radio, television and film writer.
- Debra Hill, 54, American screenwriter and film producer (Halloween, Escape from New York, The Fisher King), cancer.
- Bildad Kaggia, 82, Kenyan politician.
- Philip Lamantia, 77, American surrealist poet.
- Sir Peregrine Rhodes, 79, British diplomat, Ambassador to Greece (1982–1985)

=== 8 ===
- Ross Benson, 56, British journalist for the Daily Mail and award-winning foreign correspondent.
- Larry Bunker, 76, American jazz drummer.
- Ozzie Clay, 63, American football player (Iowa State Cyclones, Washington Redskins).
- Alice Thomas Ellis, 72, English writer, lung cancer.
- Gordon Kay, 88, American film producer.
- Peter Keetman, 88, German photographer.
- Zulfiqar Ali Khan, 74, Pakistan Air Force officer and later a diplomat, heart attack.
- César Lattes, 80, Brazilian physicist, contributed to the physics of elementary particles.
- Aslan Maskhadov, 53, Chechen separatist leader, killed by Russian troops.
- Brigitte Mira, 94, German actress.

=== 9 ===
- Norman Adams, 78, British artist.
- Meredith Davies, 82, British conductor.
- Glenn Davis, 80, American football player (Army Cadets, Los Angeles Rams), Heisman Trophy winner, prostate cancer.
- Sheila Gish, 62, English actress (Company, Highlander, Mansfield Park), cancer.
- Chris LeDoux, 56, American country music and rodeo star, complications from liver cancer.
- William Murray, 78, American mystery novelist.
- István Nyers, 80, Hungarian footballer.
- Michael O'Higgins, 87, Irish Fine Gael politician.
- Jeanette Schmid, 80, German-Austrian professional transgender whistler.
- Redmond A. Simonsen, 62, American game designer.

=== 10 ===
- Dave Allen, 68, Irish comedian, sudden arrhythmic death syndrome.
- Debbi Besserglick, 49, Israeli actress and voice actress, cancer.
- Ery Bos, 96, German dancer and film actress.
- Danny Joe Brown, 53, American singer (Molly Hatchet), kidney failure.
- Shawqi Daif, 95, Egyptian literary critic and historian.
- Kent Hadley, 70, American baseball player (Kansas City Athletics, New York Yankees).
- Earl Hawkins, 84, American basketball player (Tri-Cities Blackhawks).
- Zbigniew Jasiukiewicz, 57, Polish volleyball player and Olympian (1968).
- Mindy Jostyn, 48, American singer and multi-instrumentalist, cancer.
- Bruno Manser, 45, Swiss environmental activist.
- Jacqueline Pierreux, 82, French film and television actress.
- Zilka Salaberry, 87, Brazilian actress, pulmonary emphysema.

=== 11 ===
- Aurelio Fierro, 81, Italian actor and singer, specialising in songs in the Neapolitan dialect.
- Karen Wynn Fonstad, 59, American cartographer and academic, author of atlases of fictional worlds, breast cancer.
- Humphrey Spender, 94, British photojournalist, notably for Picture Post.
- Cherry Drummond, 16th Baroness Strange, 76, British biographer and hereditary peer in the House of Lords.
- Herbert Arthur Strauss, 86, German-American historian.

=== 12 ===
- Aleksandar Atanacković, 84, Serbian footballer and Olympian (1948).
- Orlando Azinhais, 71, Portuguese Olympic fencer (1960).
- Carl Beck-Friis, 83, Swedish Olympic sports shooter (1960).
- Norbert Callens, 80, Belgian cyclist.
- Bill Cameron, 62, Canadian journalist, cancer.
- Amir Drori, 67, Israeli general and founder of the Israel Antiquities Authority, heart attack.
- Douglas Elliot, 81, Scottish international rugby union player.
- Lisa Fittko, 95, German resistance member during World War II, pneumonia.
- Stanley Grenz, 55, American Christian theologian, intracranial aneurysm.
- Amanullah Khan, 71, Pakistani test cricket umpire.
- Stavros Kouyioumtzis, 73, Greek music composer.
- Zbigniew Kuźmiński, 83, Polish film director and screenwriter.
- Walter Schuur, 94, German Olympic canoeist (1936).
- Carlos de la Serna, 83, Argentine Olympic equestrian (1956).
- Gordon Sherritt, 85, Canadian ice hockey player (Detroit Red Wings).
- Ali Zaky, 74-75, Egyptian Olympic gymnast (1948, 1952).

=== 13 ===
- Clinton Benjamin, 53, Nauruan politician.
- Lyn Collins, 56, American soul singer, aka "Female Preacher", heart attack.
- Ahmed Hassan Diria, 67, Tanzanian politician and diplomat, foreign minister (1990-1993).
- Jason Evers, 83, American actor (The Brain That Wouldn't Die)., heart attack.
- Frank House, 75, American baseball player (Detroit Tigers, Kansas City Athletics, Cincinnati Reds), and Alabama legislator.
- Hal Seeger, 87, American animated cartoon producer and director.
- Yoshihisa Taira, 67, Japanese-born French composer.

=== 14 ===
- Monika Beu, 41, German volleyball player and Olympian (1988).
- Geneviève Burdel, 58, French figure skater and Olympian (1964).
- Stan Campbell, 74, American NFL gridiron football player (Detroit Lions, Philadelphia Eagles, Oakland Raiders).
- Rufus Deal, 87, American football player (Washington Redskins).
- Jerome Frank, 95, American psychiatrist.
- Midhat Gluhačević, 39, Bosnian footballer.
- Janet Reger, 69, British designer of women's lingerie.
- Donald Thompson, 73, British politician.
- Simon Webb, 55, British chess grandmaster living in Sweden, stabbed.
- Akira Yoshizawa, 94, Japanese origami master, pneumonia.
- Asghar Zoghian, 75, Iranian Olympic wrestler (1964).

=== 15 ===
- Renzo Alverà, 72, Italian bobsledder and Olympic silver medalist (1956).
- Audrey Callaghan, Baroness Callaghan of Cardiff, 89, First Lady as wife of James Callaghan, Alzheimer's disease.
- Loe de Jong, 90, Dutch historian.
- Don Durant, 72, American actor (Johnny Ringo) and singer, lymphoma.
- Otar Korkia, 81, Georgian basketball player and Olympian (1952).
- Miklós Kretzoi, 98, Hungarian geologist, paleontologist and paleoanthropologist.
- Bill McGarry, 77, English football manager.
- Shoji Nishio, 77, Japanese aikido teacher holding the rank of 8th dan shihan from the Aikikai, cancer.
- Jim Pearcy, 86, American football player (Marshall Thundering Herd, Chicago Rockets/Hornets).
- Bert Pronk, 54, Dutch road cyclist, cancer.
- Judith Scott, 61, American fiber sculptor and outsider artist.

=== 16 ===
- Arciso Artesiani, 83, Italian motorcycle racer.
- Todd Bell, 46, American gridiron football player (Chicago Bears), heart attack.
- Bijeh, 30, Iranian serial killer, execution by hanging.
- William Brown, 76, British structural engineer and bridge designer.
- Sergiu Cunescu, 82, Romanian politician, leader of the Social Democratic Party of Romania (PSDR) (1990-2001).
- Timofei Dokshizer, 83, Soviet Russian trumpeter and music teacher.
- Ralph Erskine, 91, British architect (Byker Wall).
- Jean-Pierre Genet, 64, French road bicycle racer.
- Anthony George, 84, American actor, pulmonary emphysema.
- Allan Hendrickse, 77, South African politician, heart attack.
- Justin Hinds, 62, Jamaican vocalist and songwriter, lung cancer.
- Eric Johnston, 91, Australian Olympic water polo player (1948).
- Chris van der Klaauw, 80, Dutch politician and diplomat.
- George C. Lang, 58, American soldier, Medal of Honor recipient.
- William Lehman, 91, American politician, member of the United States House of Representatives (1973-1993).
- Dick Radatz, 67, American baseball player, suicide from jumping.
- John Tojeiro, 81, Engineer and racing car designer.

=== 17 ===
- Irvine Barrow, 92, Canadian accountant and politician, member of the Senate of Canada (1974-1988).
- Gary Bertini, 77, Israeli conductor and composer.
- Jeremy Blacker, 65, British army general.
- Mike Campbell-Lamerton, 71, British army officer and rugby player, prostate cancer.
- Ernest Childers, 87, US Army officer and a recipient of the Medal of Honor, for his actions during World War II.
- Klaus Dierks, 69, German-Namibian deputy government minister and civil engineer.
- Royce Frith, 81, Canadian senator, member of the Senate of Canada (1977-1994).
- Prentice Gautt, 67, American NFL gridiron football player (Oklahoma Sooners, Cleveland Browns, St. Louis Cardinals).
- Lalo Guerrero, 88, American father of Chicano music.
- Sverre Holm, 73, Norwegian actor, cancer.
- George F. Kennan, 101, American diplomat and historian.
- David Little, 46, American gridiron football player, (Pittsburgh Steelers), accidental death.
- Norm Mager, 78, American basketball player (CCNY Beavers, Baltimore Bullets), cancer.
- Jean M. Muller, 79, French bridge engineer.
- Andre Norton, 93, American science fiction and fantasy author.
- Edmund Reitter, 100, Austrian sculptor.
- Czesław Słania, 83, Polish postage stamp and banknote engraver.
- László Fejes Tóth, 90, Hungarian mathematician.
- Theodor Uppman, 85, American operatic baritone.

=== 18 ===
- Ömer Diler, 60, Turkish numismatist specializing in Islamic coins, lung cancer.
- Encarnación Cabré Herreros, 93, Spanish archaeologist.
- Sol Linowitz, 91, American diplomat and entrepreneur.
- Maria Rosseels, 88, Belgian writer and journalist.

=== 19 ===
- Greg Cook, 46, American college basketball player (LSU Tigers).
- John DeLorean, 80, American car designer and manufacturer, stroke.
- Wim van der Gijp, 76, Dutch football player and manager.
- Sándor Orbán, 57, Hungarian Olympic boxer (1976).
- John H. Pickering, 89, American lawyer.
- Knox Ramsey, 79, American gridiron football player (Chicago Cardinals, Philadelphia Eagles, Washington Redskins).
- Gertrude Wilhelmsen, 92, American Olympic athlete (1936).

=== 20 ===
- Ronnie Bird, 63, English footballer (Bradford Park Avenue F.C., Birmingham City F.C.).
- Ted Brown, 80, American radio personality, stroke.
- Edmund Clowney, 87, American theologian, educator, and pastor.
- Walter Hopps, 72, American art dealer and gallery owner.
- Armand Lohikoski, 93, Finnish movie director and writer.
- Maynard Jack Ramsay, 90, American entomologist, pneumonia.
- Walter Reuter, 99, Mexican photojournalist of German origin.
- Oscar Verona, 80, Italian Olympic wrestler (1948).

=== 21 ===
- Fred Blair, 98, American communist politician.
- Mihály Bodosi, 95, Hungarian high jumper and Olympian (1936).
- Vekoslav Grmič, 81, Slovenian Roman Catholic bishop and theologian.
- Clemente Domínguez y Gómez, 58, Spanish antipope self-proclaimed Gregory XVII in 1978.
- Barney Martin, 82, American actor (Seinfeld, The Producers, Arthur), lung cancer.
- Tom Michel, 64, American football halfback.
- Stanley Sadie, 74, English musicologist and critic, Lou Gehrig's disease.
- Bobby Short, 80, American cabaret singer and pianist, leukemia.
- Gerry Svensson, 46, Swedish Olympic wrestler (1984).

=== 22 ===
- Denio Canton, 85, Cuban baseball player.
- Vernon Carrington, 68, Jamaican rastafarian and founder of the Twelve Tribes of Israel.
- Ferenc Décsey, 78, Hungarian Olympic sports shooter (1952).
- Gemini Ganesan, 84, Indian actor, multiple organ dysfunction syndrome.
- Jean Le Guilly, 73, French racing cyclist.
- Theresa Kobuszewski, 84, American baseball player.
- Lars Leiro, 90, Norwegian politician for the Centre Party.
- Rod Price, 57, English guitarist (Foghat), heart attack.
- Kenzō Tange, 91, Japanese architect, heart failure.

=== 23 ===
- Rizvan Chitigov, 40, Chechen rebel field commander, K.I.A.
- John Good, 72, English football player.
- Naftali Halberstam, 74, Polish-American Grand Rabbi of the Bobover Hasidim.
- Charles Kent, 51, English rugly player.
- David Kossoff, 85, British actor, father of Free guitarist Paul Kossoff, liver cancer.

=== 24 ===
- Gilles Aillaud, 76, French painter, set decorator, and scenographer.
- David P. Bushnell, 91, American entrepreneur, non-Hodgkin's lymphoma.
- Mare Kandre, 42, Swedish writer of Estonian descent, unintentional prescription drug overdose.
- Shelley Mann, 67, American swimmer and Olympic medalist (1956).
- Mercedes Pardo, 83, Venezuelan painter.

=== 25 ===
- Wilbur Howard Duncan, 94, American professor of botany.
- Hasan Elsifi, 78, Egyptian film director, film producer, and screenplay writer.
- Greg Garrison, 81, American television producer and director (The Dean Martin Show, Your Show of Shows), pneumonia.
- Paul Henning, 93, American television producer (Beverly Hillbillies, Petticoat Junction, Green Acres).
- Davis McCaughey, 90, Australian politician, Governor of Victoria, Australia.
- Jean Roux-Delimal, 97, French Olympic sailor (1952).
- Ken Suttle, 76, English cricket player.
- Frank Zupo, 65, American baseball player (Baltimore Orioles).

=== 26 ===
- Achiam, 89, Israeli sculptor.
- Melihate Ajeti, 69, Kosovar actress, heart attack.
- David Boone, 53, Canadian football player, suicide.
- Einar Bragi, 83, Icelandic poet and publisher.
- James Callaghan, 92, British politician, Prime Minister (1976–1979), MP (1945–1987), pneumonia.
- Harold Cruse, 89, American academic and social critic, heart failure.
- Gérard Filion, 95, Canadian businessman and journalist.
- Allison Green, 93, American politician.
- Billy Grimes, 77, American gridiron football player (Oklahoma State Cowboys, Los Angeles Dons, Green Bay Packers).
- Paul Hester, 46, Australian drummer (Crowded House, Split Enz), suicide by hanging.
- Georgeanna Seegar Jones, 92, American scientist and endocrinologist.
- Klara Luchko, 79, Soviet, Russian and Ukrainian actress, pulmonary embolism.
- Gerald Marchand, 83, British Olympic canoeist (1952).
- Marius Russo, 90, American baseball pitcher (New York Yankees).
- Frederick Rotimi Williams, 84, Nigerian lawyer.

=== 27 ===
- Wilfred Gordon Bigelow, 91, Canadian heart surgeon and heart surgery pioneer, heart failure.
- Kemal Demirsüren, 74-75, Turkish Olympic wrestler (1952).
- Grant Johannesen, 83, American classical pianist and composer.
- Zulejka Stefanini, 93, Croatian Olympic hurdler (1936).
- Rigo Tovar, 58, Mexican singer and composer, complications from diabetes.
- Ahmad Zaki, 56, Egyptian actor, lung cancer.

=== 28 ===
- Raffaello Baldini, 80, Italian writer and poet.
- Tom Bevill, 84, American politician, member of the United States House of Representatives (1967-1997).
- Dave Freeman, 82, British scriptwriter (Benny Hill, Carry On films, etc.).
- Hermann Lause, 66, German film actor, cancer.
- Pál Losonczi, 85, Hungarian communist politician, head of state of Hungary (1967-1987).
- Moura Lympany, 89, British classical pianist.
- Robin Spry, 65, Canadian film and television producer and screenwriter, road accident.

=== 29 ===
- Johnnie Cochran, 67, American lawyer, defended O. J. Simpson, brain cancer.
- Al Dekdebrun, 83, American football player.
- Kiyotaka Hayakawa, 58, Japanese Olympic handball player (1972).
- Edward D. Head, 85, American Roman Catholic prelate, Bishop of Buffalo (1973–1995).
- Howell Heflin, 83, American politician, U.S. Senator from Alabama, heart attack.
- Elmer Musclow, 80, American racing driver.
- Charlie Phillips, 87, Canadian ice hockey player (Montreal Canadiens).
- Miltos Sachtouris, 85, Greek poet.

=== 30 ===
- Roy Askevold, 69, Norwegian Olympic boxer (1960).
- Robert Creeley, 78, American poet, complications from respiratory disease.
- Emil Dimitrov, 64, Bulgarian singer and musician.
- Alan Dundes, 70, American folklorist and teacher, heart attack.
- Felicitas Goodman, 91, American linguist and anthropologist.
- Milton Green, 91, American record holder in hurdling, boycotted the nazi's 1936 Summer Olympics.
- Gulkhar Hasanova, 86, Azerbaijani mugham opera singer.
- Mitch Hedberg, 37, American comedian, multiple drug intoxication.
- Eric Roll, Baron Roll of Ipsden, 97, British economist, public servant and banker.
- Fred Korematsu, 86, Japanese-American civil rights leader, respiratory illness, respiratory failure.
- Derrick Plourde, 33, American drummer (Lagwagon, the Ataris), suicide.
- O. V. Vijayan, 74, Indian author and cartoonist.

=== 31 ===
- O. P. Jindal, 74, Indian industrialist and politician, helicopter crash.
- Yeiki Kobashigawa, 87, United States Army soldier and recipient of the Medal of Honor.
- Stanley J. Korsmeyer, 54, American research scientist, lung cancer.
- Justiniano Montano, 99, Filipino politician and lawyer.
- Charles Palmer, 85, English cricketer.
- Frank Perdue, 84, American poultry magnate.
- Terri Schiavo, 41, American persistent vegetative state patient.
- Surender Singh, 58, Indian politician, MP Rajya Sabha (1986-1992), MP Lok Sabha (1996-1999), helicopter crash.
