= Cabre =

Cabre may refer to:

In people

- Anna Cabré (born 1943), Catalan geographer and professor emeritus
- Chase Cabre (born 1997), American stock car racing drive
- Encarnación Cabré (1911–2005), Spanish archaeologist
- Jaume Cabré (born 1947), Catalan philologist, novelist and screenwriter
- Josep Cabré (born 1956), Catalan bass-baritone singer and choral conductor
- Manuel Cabré (1890-1984), noted Spanish-Venezuelan landscape painter
- María Teresa Cabré (born 1947) is a Catalan linguist
- Nicolás Cabré (born 1980), Argentine actor and television host

In other

- Cabre language, extinct Arawakan language of Colombia
