= Hans Werner =

Hans Werner is a name. It can refer to:

- Hans Thimig, Austrian actor known by his pseudonym Hans Werner
- Hans-Werner Goetz, German historian
- Hans-Werner Wohlers, German boxer
- Hans-Werner Hartl, German footballer
- Hans Werner Kettenbach, German journalist and writer
- Hans Werner Debrunner, Swiss German historian and theologian
- Hans-Werner Bothe, German philosopher and neurosurgeon
- Hans-Werner Wanzlick, German chemist
- Hans Magnus Werner, Swedish revue artist
- Hans-Werner Seher, German water polo player
- Hans Werner Lissmann, British zoologist
- Hans-Werner Schwarz, German politician
- Hans Werner Schmidt, German painter, illustrator and etcher
- Hans Werner Henze, German composer
