= Spain at the FIFA World Cup =

International football delegation

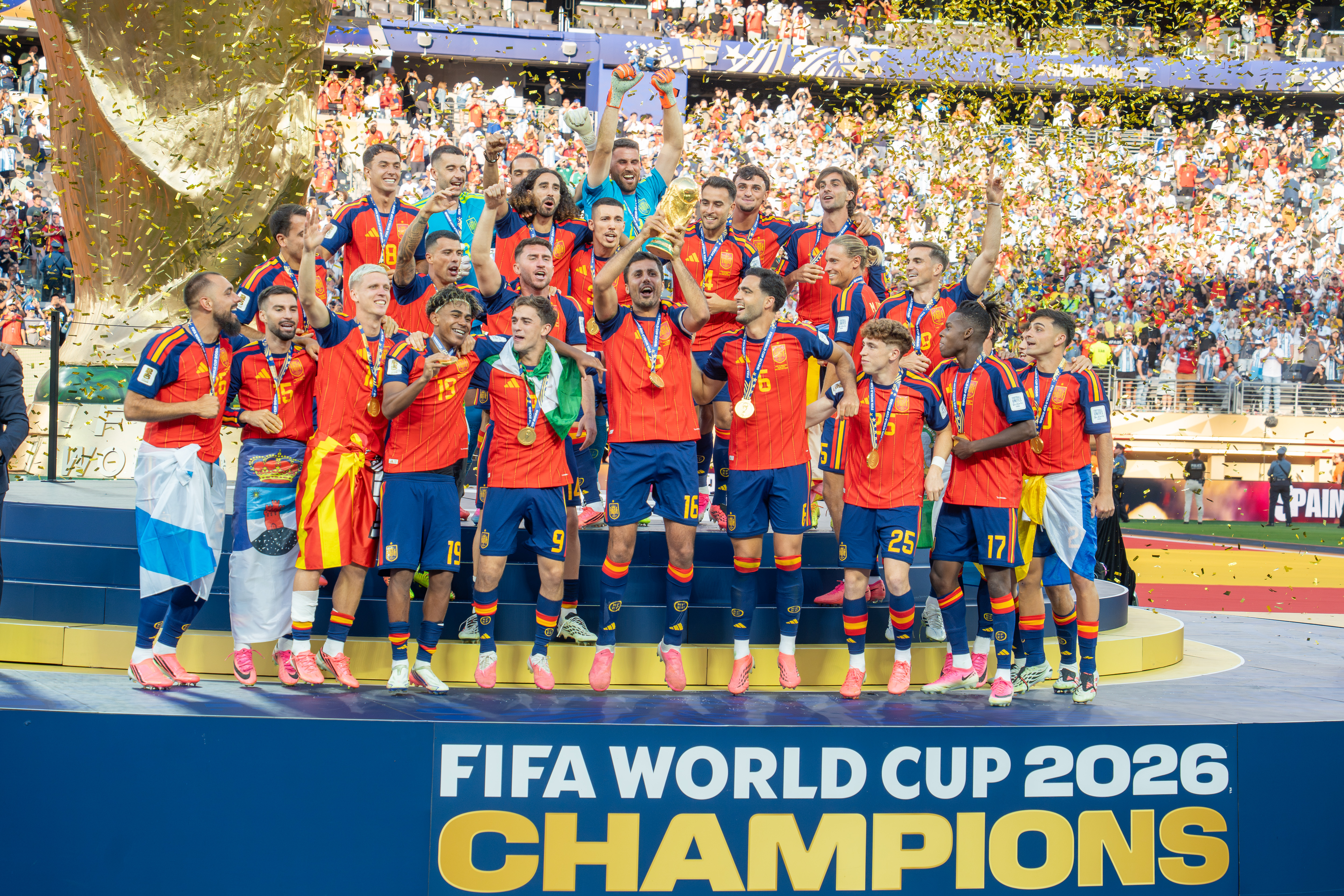
Spain celebrating their second title at the 2026 FIFA World Cup

Spain is one of the most experienced nations in FIFA World Cup history, having made 17 appearances in the tournament's 23 editions. Spain has reached the final twice, winning the title on both occasions, in 2010 and 2026.

Prior to their two wins, Spain's best World Cup result was a fourth-place finish in 1950.

== FIFA World Cup record ==
Champions Runners-up Third place Hosts or co-hosts

FIFA World Cup record									Qualification record					
Year	Result	Position	Pld	W	D*	L	GF	GA	Pld	W	D	L	GF	GA
(Uruguay) 1930	Did not enter								Declined Participation					
(Italy) 1934	Quarter-finals	5th	3	1	1	1	4	3	2	2	0	0	11	1
(France) 1938	Withdrew								Withdrew					
(Brazil) 1950	Fourth place (Note: No semi finals or third place match was played. Instead this was a round robin final group stage.)	4th	6	3	1	2	10	12	2	1	1	0	7	3
(Switzerland) 1954	Did not qualify								3	1	1	1	6	4
(Sweden) 1958	Did not qualify								4	2	1	1	12	8
(Chile) 1962	Group stage	12th	3	1	0	2	2	3	4	3	1	0	7	4
(England) 1966	Group stage	10th	3	1	0	2	4	5	3	2	0	1	5	2
(Mexico) 1970	Did not qualify								6	2	2	2	10	6
(West Germany) 1974	Did not qualify								5	2	2	1	8	6
(Argentina) 1978	Group stage	10th	3	1	1	1	2	2	4	3	0	1	4	1
(Spain) 1982	Second group stage	12th	5	1	2	2	4	5	Qualified as hosts					
(Mexico) 1986	Quarter-finals	7th	5	3	1	1	11	4	6	4	0	2	9	8
(Italy) 1990	Round of 16	10th	4	2	1	1	6	4	8	6	1	1	20	3
(United States) 1994	Quarter-finals	8th	5	2	2	1	10	6	12	8	3	1	27	4
(France) 1998	Group stage	17th	3	1	1	1	8	4	10	8	2	0	26	6
(South Korea) (Japan) 2002	Quarter-finals	5th	5	3	2	0	10	5	8	6	2	0	21	4
(Germany) 2006	Round of 16	9th	4	3	0	1	9	4	12	6	6	0	25	5
(South Africa) 2010	Champions	1st	7	6	0	1	8	2	10	10	0	0	28	5
(Brazil) 2014	Group stage	23rd	3	1	0	2	4	7	8	6	2	0	14	3
(Russia) 2018	Round of 16	10th	4	1	3	0	7	6	10	9	1	0	36	3
(Qatar) 2022	Round of 16	13th	4	1	2	1	9	3	8	6	1	1	15	5
(Canada) (Mexico) (United States) 2026	Champions	1st	8	7	1	0	14	1	6	5	1	0	21	2
(Morocco) (Portugal) (Spain) 2030	Qualified as co-hosts								Qualified as co-hosts					
(Saudi Arabia) 2034	To be determined								To be determined					
Total:17/23	2 Titles	1st	75	38	18	19	122	76	131	92	27	12	312	83

*Draws include knockout matches decided via penalty shoot-out

Spain's World Cup record
First match	Spain 3–1 Brazil (27 May 1934; Genoa, Italy)
Biggest win	Spain 7–0 Costa Rica (23 November 2022; Doha, Qatar)
Biggest defeat	Brazil 6–1 Spain (13 July 1950; Rio de Janeiro, Brazil)
Best result	Champions in 2010 and 2026
Worst result	Group stage in 1962, 1966, 1978, 1998 and 2014

== By match ==
Year	Round	Opponent	Score	Spain scorers
(Italy) 1934	Round of 16	Brazil	3–1	Iraragorri (2), Lángara
(Italy) 1934	Quarter-final	Italy	1–1 (a.e.t.)	Regueiro
(Italy) 1934	Quarter-final	Italy	0–1	—
(Brazil) 1950	Group 2	United States	3–1	Igoa, Basora, Zarra
(Brazil) 1950	Group 2	Chile	2–0	Basora, Zarra
(Brazil) 1950	Group 2	England	1–0	Zarra
(Brazil) 1950	Final round	Uruguay	2–2	Basora (2)
(Brazil) 1950	Final round	Brazil	1–6	Igoa
(Brazil) 1950	Final round	Sweden	1–3	Zarra
(Chile) 1962	Group 3	Czechoslovakia	0–1	—
(Chile) 1962	Group 3	Mexico	1–0	Peiró
(Chile) 1962	Group 3	Brazil	1–2	Adelardo
(England) 1966	Group 2	Argentina	1–2	Pirri
(England) 1966	Group 2	Switzerland	2–1	Sanchís, Amancio
(England) 1966	Group 2	West Germany	1–2	Fusté
(Argentina) 1978	Group 3	Austria	1–2	Dani
(Argentina) 1978	Group 3	Brazil	0–0	—
(Argentina) 1978	Group 3	Sweden	1–0	Asensi
(Spain) 1982	Group 5	Honduras	1–1	López Ufarte
(Spain) 1982	Group 5	Yugoslavia	2–1	Juanito, Saura
(Spain) 1982	Group 5	Northern Ireland	0–1	—
(Spain) 1982	Group B	West Germany	1–2	Zamora
(Spain) 1982	Group B	England	0–0	—
(Mexico) 1986	Group D	Brazil	0–1	—
(Mexico) 1986	Group D	Northern Ireland	2–1	Butragueño, Salinas
(Mexico) 1986	Group D	Algeria	3–0	Calderé (2), Eloy
(Mexico) 1986	Round of 16	Denmark	5–1	Butragueño (4), A. Goikoetxea
(Mexico) 1986	Quarter-final	Belgium	1–1 (a.e.t.) (4–5 p)	Señor
(Italy) 1990	Group E	Uruguay	0–0	—
(Italy) 1990	Group E	South Korea	3–1	Míchel (3)
(Italy) 1990	Group E	Belgium	2–1	Míchel, Górriz
(Italy) 1990	Round of 16	Yugoslavia	1–2 (a.e.t.)	Salinas
(United States) 1994	Group C	South Korea	2–2	Salinas, J.A. Goikoetxea
(United States) 1994	Group C	Germany	1–1	J.A. Goikoetxea
(United States) 1994	Group C	Bolivia	3–1	Guardiola, Caminero (2)
(United States) 1994	Round of 16	Switzerland	3–0	Hierro, Luis Enrique, Begiristain
(United States) 1994	Quarter-final	Italy	1–2	Caminero
(France) 1998	Group D	Nigeria	2–3	Hierro, Raúl
(France) 1998	Group D	Paraguay	0–0	—
(France) 1998	Group D	Bulgaria	6–1	Hierro, Luis Enrique, Morientes (2), Bachev (o.g.), Kiko
(South Korea) (Japan) 2002	Group B	Slovenia	3–1	Raúl, Valerón, Hierro
(South Korea) (Japan) 2002	Group B	Paraguay	3–1	Morientes (2), Hierro
(South Korea) (Japan) 2002	Group B	South Africa	3–2	Raúl (2), Mendieta
(South Korea) (Japan) 2002	Round of 16	Republic of Ireland	1–1 (a.e.t.) (3–2 p)	Morientes
(South Korea) (Japan) 2002	Quarter-final	South Korea	0–0 (a.e.t.) (3–5 p)	—
(Germany) 2006	Group H	Ukraine	4–0	Alonso, Villa (2), Fern. Torres
(Germany) 2006	Group H	Tunisia	3–1	Raúl, Fern. Torres (2)
(Germany) 2006	Group H	Saudi Arabia	1–0	Juanito
(Germany) 2006	Round of 16	France	1–3	Villa
(South Africa) 2010	Group H	Switzerland	0–1	—
(South Africa) 2010	Group H	Honduras	2–0	Villa (2)
(South Africa) 2010	Group H	Chile	2–1	Villa, Iniesta
(South Africa) 2010	Round of 16	Portugal	1–0	Villa
(South Africa) 2010	Quarter-final	Paraguay	1–0	Villa
(South Africa) 2010	Semi-final	Germany	1–0	Puyol
(South Africa) 2010	Final	Netherlands	1–0 (a.e.t.)	Iniesta
(Brazil) 2014	Group B	Netherlands	1–5	Alonso
(Brazil) 2014	Group B	Chile	0–2	—
(Brazil) 2014	Group B	Australia	3–0	Villa, Fern. Torres, Mata
(Russia) 2018	Group B	Portugal	3–3	Costa (2), Nacho
(Russia) 2018	Group B	Iran	1–0	Costa
(Russia) 2018	Group B	Morocco	2–2	Isco, Aspas
(Russia) 2018	Round of 16	Russia	1–1 (a.e.t.) (3–5 p)	Ignashevich (o.g.)
(Qatar) 2022	Group E	Costa Rica	7–0	Olmo, Asensio, Ferr. Torres (2), Gavi, Soler, Morata
(Qatar) 2022	Group E	Germany	1–1	Morata
(Qatar) 2022	Group E	Japan	1–2	Morata
(Qatar) 2022	Round of 16	Morocco	0–0 (a.e.t.) (0–3 p)	—
(Canada) (Mexico) (United States) 2026	Group H	Cape Verde	0–0	—
(Canada) (Mexico) (United States) 2026	Group H	Saudi Arabia	4–0	Yamal, Oyarzabal (2), Al-Tambakti (o.g.)
(Canada) (Mexico) (United States) 2026	Group H	Uruguay	1–0	Baena
(Canada) (Mexico) (United States) 2026	Round of 32	Austria	3–0	Oyarzabal (2), Porro
(Canada) (Mexico) (United States) 2026	Round of 16	Portugal	1–0	Merino
(Canada) (Mexico) (United States) 2026	Quarter-final	Belgium	2–1	Fabián, Merino
(Canada) (Mexico) (United States) 2026	Semi-final	France	2–0	Oyarzabal, Porro
(Canada) (Mexico) (United States) 2026	Final	Argentina	1–0 (a.e.t.)	Ferr. Torres
(Morocco) (Portugal) (Spain) 2030	TBD	TBD	v	

== By opponent ==
FIFA World Cup matches (by opponent)
Opponent	Played	Won	Drawn	Lost	GF	GA	GD
Germany	5	1	2	2	5	6	−1
Brazil	5	1	1	3	5	10	−5
Paraguay	3	2	1	0	4	1	+3
Switzerland	3	2	0	1	5	2	+3
Belgium	3	2	1	0	5	3	+2
Portugal	3	2	1	0	5	3	+2
Chile	3	2	0	1	4	3	+1
South Korea	3	1	2	0	5	3	+2
Uruguay	3	1	2	0	3	2	+1
Italy	3	0	1	2	2	4	−2
Saudi Arabia	2	2	0	0	5	0	+5
Honduras	2	1	1	0	3	1	+2
England	2	1	1	0	1	0	+1
Austria	2	1	0	1	4	2	+2
Argentina	2	1	0	1	2	2	0
France	2	1	0	1	3	3	0
Northern Ireland	2	1	0	1	2	2	0
Serbia	2	1	0	1	2	2	0
Sweden	2	1	0	1	2	3	−1
Morocco	2	0	2	0	2	2	0
Netherlands	2	1	0	1	2	5	−3
Costa Rica	1	1	0	0	7	0	+7
Bulgaria	1	1	0	0	6	1	+5
Denmark	1	1	0	0	5	1	+4
Ukraine	1	1	0	0	4	0	+4
Algeria	1	1	0	0	3	0	+3
Australia	1	1	0	0	3	0	+3
United States	1	1	0	0	3	1	+2
Bolivia	1	1	0	0	3	1	+2
Slovenia	1	1	0	0	3	1	+2
Tunisia	1	1	0	0	3	1	+2
South Africa	1	1	0	0	3	2	+1
Mexico	1	1	0	0	1	0	+1
Iran	1	1	0	0	1	0	+1
Republic of Ireland	1	0	1	0	1	1	0
Russia	1	0	1	0	1	1	0
Cape Verde	1	0	1	0	0	0	0
Nigeria	1	0	0	1	2	3	−1
Japan	1	0	0	1	1	2	−1
Czechoslovakia	1	0	0	1	0	1	−1

== 2010 FIFA World Cup ==
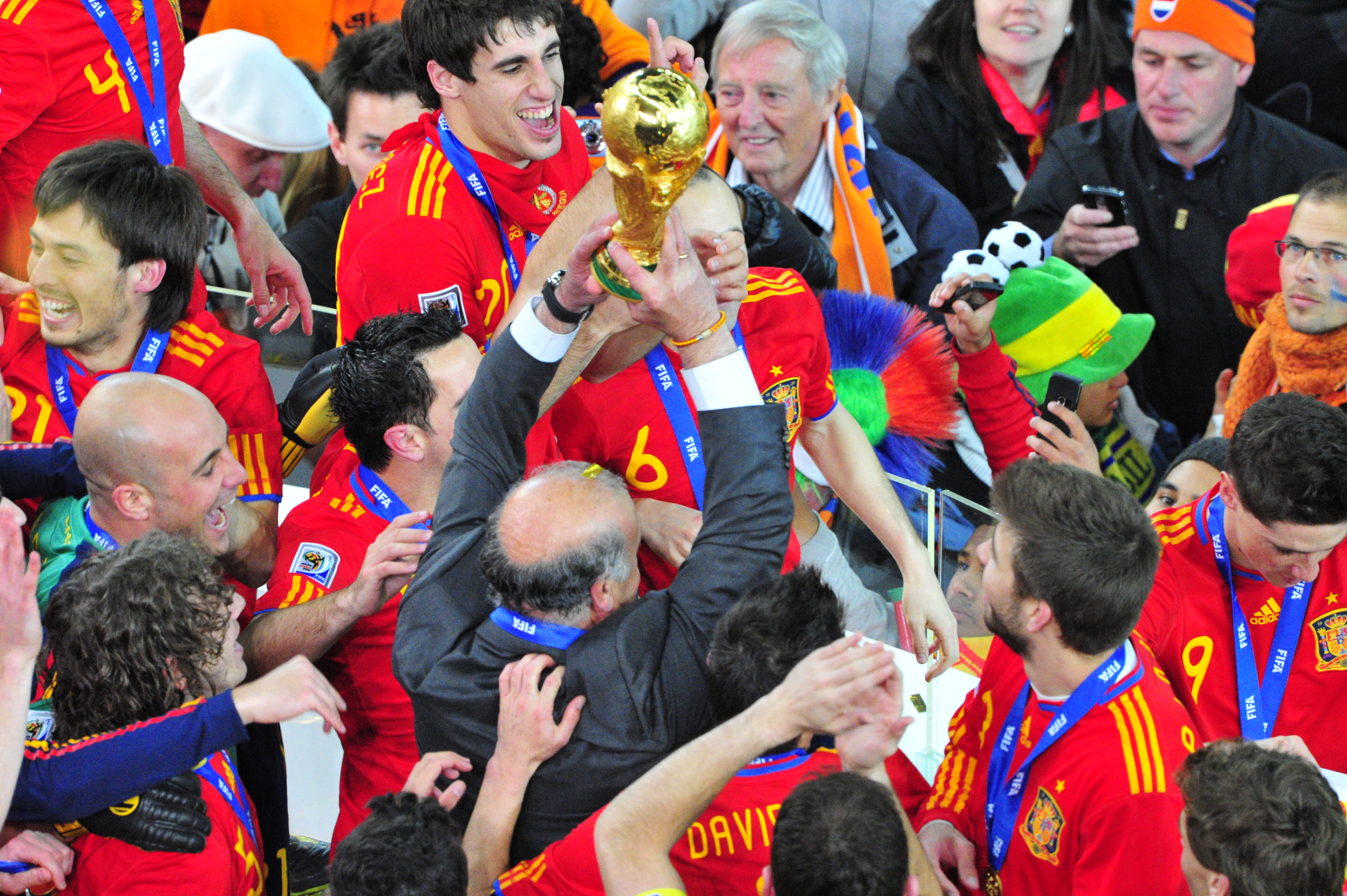
Spain celebrating their first victory in the 2010 FIFA World Cup in South Africa.

The Spanish team went to the 2010 World Cup in South Africa as European champions and enjoyed a record unbeaten streak of 35 matches from 2007 to 2009. Although they lost their first match 1–0 against Switzerland, they went on to win the group after victories over Honduras and Chile, while the Swiss failed to win another match and were eliminated.

The Spanish team won all three following knockout matches by a score of 1–0, always scoring in the second half of regular time. The opponents were Portugal, Paraguay and Germany.

=== 2010 World Cup final v Netherlands ===
This was Spain's first and the Netherlands' third appearance in a World Cup final, but neither had ever won the trophy. Spain was the dominating side with 57% ball possession, but the Dutch opponents had several chances as well. In a rough match, referee Howard Webb showed fourteen yellow cards and sent off Dutch defender John Heitinga in the second half of extra time, after regular time ended goalless. However, even with the five yellow cards received in the final, the Spanish team was awarded the FIFA Fair Play Trophy after collecting only eight yellow cards in seven matches.

The winning goal was scored by Andrés Iniesta, a right foot strike from inside the box after an assist by Cesc Fàbregas.

11 July 2010
20:30

Netherlands	0–1 (a.e.t.)	Spain
		Iniesta 116'

Soccer City, Johannesburg
Attendance: 84,490
Referee: Howard Webb (England)

Netherlands	Spain

GK	1	Maarten Stekelenburg
RB	2	Gregory van der Wiel	(yellow card) 111'
CB	3	John Heitinga	(yellow card) 57' (yellow-red card) 109'
CB	4	Joris Mathijsen	(yellow card) 117'
LB	5	Giovanni van Bronckhorst (c)	(yellow card) 54'	(substituted off) 105'
CM	6	Mark van Bommel	(yellow card) 22'
CM	8	Nigel de Jong	(yellow card) 28'	(substituted off) 99'
RW	11	Arjen Robben	(yellow card) 84'
AM	10	Wesley Sneijder
LW	7	Dirk Kuyt		(substituted off) 71'
CF	9	Robin van Persie	(yellow card) 15'
Substitutions:
MF	17	Eljero Elia		(substituted on) 71'
MF	23	Rafael van der Vaart		(substituted on) 99'
DF	15	Edson Braafheid		(substituted on) 105'
Manager:
Bert van Marwijk

GK	1	Iker Casillas (c)
RB	15	Sergio Ramos	(yellow card) 23'
CB	3	Gerard Piqué
CB	5	Carles Puyol	(yellow card) 16'
LB	11	Joan Capdevila	(yellow card) 67'
DM	16	Sergio Busquets
DM	14	Xabi Alonso		(substituted off) 87'
CM	8	Xavi	(yellow card) 120+1'
RW	6	Andrés Iniesta	(yellow card) 118'
LW	18	Pedro		(substituted off) 60'
CF	7	David Villa		(substituted off) 106'
Substitutions:
MF	22	Jesús Navas		(substituted on) 60'
MF	10	Cesc Fàbregas		(substituted on) 87'
FW	9	Fernando Torres		(substituted on) 106'
Manager:
Vicente del Bosque

Man of the Match:
Andrés Iniesta (Spain)

Assistant referees:
Darren Cann (England)
Michael Mullarkey (England)
Fourth official:
Yuichi Nishimura (Japan)
Fifth official:
Toru Sagara (Japan)

== 2026 FIFA World Cup ==
Just like in 2010, Spain entered the tournament as the current European champions, and were thus considered among the top favourites to win the cup. They began their campaign with a 0–0 draw against World Cup debutants Cape Verde. The result was considered a major World Cup upset and put doubts in the minds of many if Spain would be true contenders for the tournament. It also mirrored Spain's surprise 0–1 opening defeat against Switzerland in 2010. In their following match against Saudi Arabia, Spain were able to find their rhythm in a dominant 4–0 win. For their last group fixture, they faced former winners Uruguay; in a match that was marked by many fouls from the South Americans, Spain was able to come out with a 1–0 victory, ensuring they entered the knockout stage as group winners and eliminating Uruguay in the process.

In the newly-established round of 32, Spain would face off against Austria, where they cruised to a 3–0 victory. In the round of 16, Spain faced their Iberian rivals Portugal, in what was considered their toughest opponent yet. After a close first half, Spain managed to find the net in the dying moments of the game and win 1–0, advancing to the quarter-finals for the first time since 2010. Spain would then defeat Belgium 2–1 in the quarter-finals following another late winner, conceding a goal at the tournament for the first time. Spain's 2–0 win over second-ranked side France in the semi-finals saw them equal the historic record held by Italy of 37 consecutive matches unbeaten, and ensured Spain's progression to the World Cup final for only the second time in their history.

=== 2026 World Cup final v Argentina ===
Spain faced defending champions Argentina in the final, the first competitive meeting between the two sides since the 1966 World Cup. Following a contest largely dominated by Spain and a red card shown to Argentina's Enzo Fernández, Spain finally broke the deadlock in the second half of extra time thanks to a goal from Ferran Torres. Just as in 2010, Spain would win the final 1–0 after extra time, becoming the first national team to hold the men's and women's World Cup titles simultaneously, as the Spanish women's team had won the 2023 title. They conceded only one goal across the eight matches they played at the tournament, and also overtook Italy as the sole holders of the longest undefeated streak in men's international football.

July 19, 2026
3:00 p.m. UTC−4

Spain	1–0 (a.e.t.)	Argentina
Torres 106'	(Note: "Spain vs Argentina | Final | FIFA World Cup 2026". FIFA. Retrieved July 19, 2026.; "Match Report – Final – Spain v. Argentina". FIFA. July 19, 2026. Retrieved July 19, 2026.; "Post match summary report – Final – Spain v. Argentina". FIFA. July 20, 2026. Retrieved July 20, 2026.)

MetLife Stadium, East Rutherford
Attendance: 80,663
Referee: Slavko Vinčić (Slovenia)

Spain	Argentina

GK	23	Unai Simón
RB	12	Pedro Porro
CB	22	Pau Cubarsí
CB	14	Aymeric Laporte	(substituted off) 99'
LB	24	Marc Cucurella
DM	16	Rodri (c)	(substituted off) 99'
CM	10	Dani Olmo	(substituted off) 75'
CM	8	Fabián Ruiz	(substituted off) 62'
RF	19	Lamine Yamal
CF	21	Mikel Oyarzabal	(substituted off) 62'
LF	15	Álex Baena	(substituted off) 75'
Substitutions:
FW	7	Ferran Torres	(substituted on) 62'
MF	20	Pedri	(substituted on) 62'
MF	6	Mikel Merino	(substituted on) 75'
FW	17	Nico Williams	(substituted on) 75'
MF	18	Martín Zubimendi	(substituted on) 99'
DF	4	Eric Garcia	(substituted on) 99'
Manager:
Luis de la Fuente

GK	23	Emiliano Martínez
RB	4	Gonzalo Montiel		(substituted off) 58'
CB	13	Cristian Romero	(yellow card) 90+2'	(substituted off) 70'
CB	6	Lisandro Martínez	(yellow card) 41'	(substituted off) 44'
LB	3	Nicolás Tagliafico
RM	7	Rodrigo De Paul		(substituted off) 70'
CM	24	Enzo Fernández	(yellow card) 82' (yellow-red card) 90+3'
CM	20	Alexis Mac Allister	(yellow card) 111'
LM	15	Nicolás González		(substituted off) 46'
CF	10	Lionel Messi (c)
CF	9	Julián Alvarez		(substituted off) 102'
Substitutions:
DF	19	Nicolás Otamendi		(substituted on) 44'
MF	5	Leandro Paredes	(yellow card) 52'	(substituted on) 46'
DF	26	Nahuel Molina		(substituted on) 58'
DF	25	Facundo Medina		(substituted on) 70'
FW	17	Giuliano Simeone		(substituted on) 70'
DF	2	Marcos Senesi		(substituted on) 102'
Manager:
Lionel Scaloni			(yellow card) 105'

Man of the Match:
Ferran Torres (Spain)

Assistant referees:
Tomaž Klančnik (Slovenia)
Andraž Kovačič (Slovenia)
Fourth official:
Adham Makhadmeh (Jordan)
Reserve assistant referee:
Mohammad Al-Kalaf (Jordan)
Video assistant referee:
Bastian Dankert (Germany)
Assistant video assistant referee:
Nicolás Gallo (Colombia)
Support video assistant referee:
Khamis Al-Marri (Qatar)

== Most appearances ==
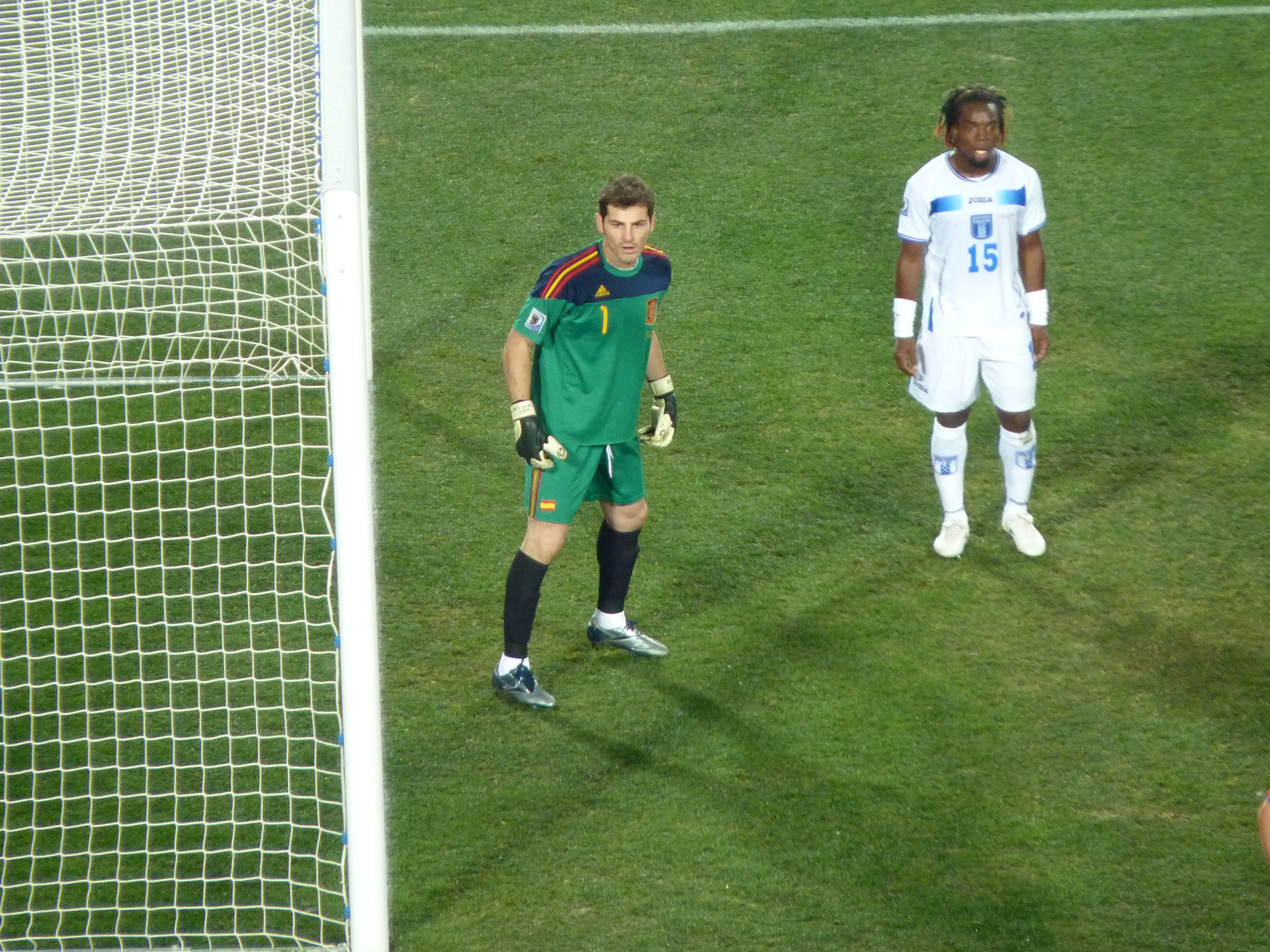
Iker Casillas (with Walter Martínez) at the 2010 World Cup in a match against Honduras

Iker Casillas captained Spain to their World Cup title in 2010 and won the Golden Glove award for best keeper at the same tournament.

Rank	Player	Matches	World Cups
1	Iker Casillas	17	2002, 2006, 2010 and 2014
1	Sergio Ramos	17	2006, 2010, 2014 and 2018
1	Sergio Busquets	17	2010, 2014, 2018 and 2022
4	Andoni Zubizarreta	16	1986, 1990, 1994 and 1998
5	Xavi	15	2002, 2006, 2010 and 2014
6	Carles Puyol	14	2002, 2006 and 2010
6	Fernando Torres	14	2006, 2010 and 2014
6	Andrés Iniesta	14	2006, 2010, 2014 and 2018
9	Xabi Alonso	13	2006, 2010 and 2014
10	Julio Salinas	12	1986, 1990 and 1994
10	Fernando Hierro	12	1994, 1998 and 2002
10	Luis Enrique	12	1994, 1998 and 2002
10	David Villa	12	2006, 2010 and 2014
10	Gerard Piqué	12	2010, 2014 and 2018
10	Dani Olmo	12	2022 and 2026
10	Pedri	12	2022 and 2026
10	Rodri	12	2022 and 2026
10	Unai Simón	12	2022 and 2026
10	Ferran Torres	12	2022 and 2026

== Top goalscorers ==
On 27 May 1934, José Iraragorri made history by scoring Spain's first-ever FIFA World Cup goal, coming in their opening match against Brazil in Genoa.

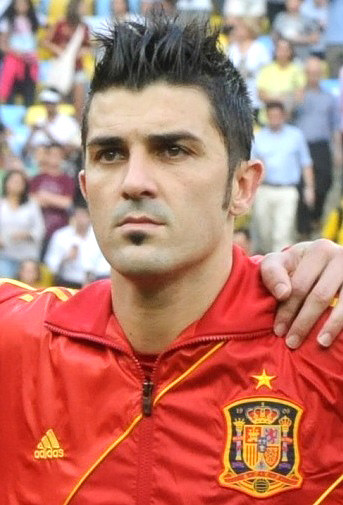
David Villa is Spain's record World Cup scorer and a 2010 tournament winner.

No Spanish player has ever won the Golden Boot, but Emilio Butragueño and Spain's record World Cup scorer David Villa have each won the Silver Boot after scoring five goals in 1986 and 2010, respectively.

Rank	Player	Goals	World Cups
1	David Villa	9	2006 (3), 2010 (5) and 2014 (1)
2	Emilio Butragueño	5	1986
2	Fernando Morientes	5	1998 (2) and 2002 (3)
2	Raúl	5	1998 (1), 2002 (3) and 2006 (1)
2	Fernando Hierro	5	1994 (1), 1998 (2) and 2002 (2)
2	Mikel Oyarzabal	5	2026
7	Estanislau Basora	4	1950
7	Telmo Zarra	4	1950
7	Míchel	4	1990
7	Fernando Torres	4	2006 (3) and 2014 (1)

== Team awards and records ==
Team awards

- World Cup winners: 2010, 2026
- FIFA Fair Play Trophy: 2006 (shared), 2010, 2018

Team records

- Fewest goals conceded in a tournament by eventual champions: 1 (2026)
- Worst finish by defending champions: Group stage (2014)
- Fewest goals scored in a tournament by eventual champions: 8 (2010)
- Longest clean sheet streak: 6 (2022–2026)
- Longest streak without conceding a goal by minutes: 650 minutes (2022–2026)
- Longest streak without a red card: 42 (1994–2026)
- Most penalty shoot-outs lost: 4 (1986, 2002, 2018, 2022) (shared with Netherlands)
- Most consecutive penalty shoot-outs losses: 3 (2002, 2018, 2022) (shared with Italy, England, Netherlands)

Individual awards

- Golden Ball 2026: Rodri
- Silver Boot 1986: Emilio Butragueño
- Silver Boot 2010: David Villa
- Bronze Boot 1950: Estanislau Basora, Telmo Zarra
- Golden Glove 2010: Iker Casillas
- Golden Glove 2026: Unai Simón
- Best Young Player Award 2026: Pau Cubarsí

Individual records

- Most clean sheets in a single tournament: 7 – Unai Simón (2026)
- Most consecutive clean sheets: 6 – Unai Simón (2022–2026)
- Most consecutive minutes without conceding a goal: 650 minutes – Unai Simón (2022–2026)
- Fewest goals conceded in a tournament for the eventual winners: 1 – Unai Simón (2026)
- Most penalties saved: 2 (Note: Not including penalty shoot-outs.) – Iker Casillas (shared with Jan Tomaszewski, Brad Friedel, Wojciech Szczęsny,Mostafa Shobeir)
- Most penalties saved overall (including shoot-outs): 4 – Iker Casillas (2002–2010) (shared with Harald Schumacher, Sergio Goycochea, Danijel Subašić, Dominik Livaković,Yassine Bounou)
- Oldest coach of a World Cup winning team: 65 years, 28 days – Luis de la Fuente (2026)

== See also ==
- Spain at the FIFA Confederations Cup
- Spain at the UEFA European Championship
