= Spain at the FIFA Confederations Cup =

Football tournament results

The Spain national football team represented Spain at the FIFA Confederations Cup on two occasions in 2009 and 2013.

== FIFA Confederations Cup ==
Spain made two appearances at the FIFA Confederations Cup. Their first appearance came in 2009 as European champions when they won a third place medal, after losing 2–0 to the United States in the semi-finals. At the next edition, Spain qualified as both World and European champions. La Roja reached the final in Brazil, but lost 3–0 to the hosts.

FIFA Confederations Cup record
Year	Round	Position	Pld	W	D	L	GF	GA	Squad
(Saudi Arabia) 1992	UEFA did not participate								
(Saudi Arabia) 1995	Did not qualify								
(Saudi Arabia) 1997	Did not qualify								
(Mexico) 1999	Did not qualify								
(South Korea) (Japan) 2001	Did not qualify								
(France) 2003	Did not qualify								
(Germany) 2005	Did not qualify								
(South Africa) 2009	Third place	3rd	5	4	0	1	11	4	Squad
(Brazil) 2013	Runners-up	2nd	5	3	1	1	15	4	Squad
(Russia) 2017	Did not qualify								
Total	Runners-up	2/10	10	7	1	2	26	8	—

Spain's Confederations Cup history
First match	Spain 5–0 New Zealand (Rustenburg, South Africa; 14 June 2009)
Biggest win	Spain 10–0 Tahiti (Rio de Janeiro, Brazil; 20 June 2013)
Biggest defeat	Brazil 3–0 Spain (Rio de Janeiro, Brazil; 30 June 2013)
Best result	Runners-up (2013)
Worst result	Third place (2009)

== 2009 FIFA Confederations Cup ==
=== Group A ===
Team	Pld	W	D	L	GF	GA	GD	Pts
Spain	3	3	0	0	8	0	+8	9
South Africa (H)	3	1	1	1	2	2	0	4
Iraq	3	0	2	1	0	1	−1	2
New Zealand	3	0	1	2	0	7	−7	1

14 June 2009
20:30 SAST

New Zealand	0–5	Spain
	Report	Torres 6', 14', 17'; Fàbregas 24'; Villa 48'

Royal Bafokeng Stadium, Rustenburg
Attendance: 21,649
Referee: Coffi Codjia (Benin)

17 June 2009
16:00 SAST

Spain	1–0	Iraq
Villa 55'	Report

Free State Stadium, Bloemfontein
Attendance: 30,512
Referee: Matthew Breeze (Australia)

20 June 2009
20:30 SAST

Spain	2–0	South Africa
Villa 52'; Llorente 72'	Report

Free State Stadium, Bloemfontein
Attendance: 38,212
Referee: Pablo Pozo (Chile)

=== Knockout stage ===
Semi-finals

24 June 2009
20:30 SAST

Spain	0–2	United States
	Report	Altidore 27'; Dempsey 74'

Free State Stadium, Bloemfontein
Attendance: 35,369
Referee: Jorge Larrionda (Uruguay)

Third place play-off

28 June 2009
15:00 SAST

Spain	3–2 (a.e.t.)	South Africa
Güiza 88', 89'; Alonso 107'	Report	Mphela 73', 90+3'

Royal Bafokeng Stadium, Rustenburg
Attendance: 31,788
Referee: Matthew Breeze (Australia)

== 2013 FIFA Confederations Cup ==
=== Group A ===
Pos	Team	Pld	W	D	L	GF	GA	GD	Pts	Qualification
1	Spain	3	3	0	0	15	1	+14	9	Advance to knockout stage
2	Uruguay	3	2	0	1	11	3	+8	6	Advance to knockout stage
3	Nigeria	3	1	0	2	7	6	+1	3	
4	Tahiti	3	0	0	3	1	24	−23	0	

Source: FIFA
16 June 2013
19:00

Spain	2–1	Uruguay
Pedro 20'; Soldado 32'	Report	Suárez 88'

Itaipava Arena Pernambuco, Recife
Attendance: 41,705
Referee: Yuichi Nishimura (Japan)

20 June 2013
16:00

Spain	10–0	Tahiti
Torres 5', 33', 57', 78'; Silva 31', 89'; Villa 39', 49', 64'; Mata 66'	Report

Estádio do Maracanã, Rio de Janeiro
Attendance: 71,806
Referee: Djamel Haimoudi (Algeria)

23 June 2013
16:00

Nigeria	0–3	Spain
	Report	Alba 3', 88'; Torres 62'

Estádio Castelão, Fortaleza
Attendance: 51,263
Referee: Joel Aguilar (El Salvador)

=== Semi-finals ===
27 June 2013
16:00

Spain	0–0 (a.e.t.)	Italy
	Report
Penalties
Xavi (penalty scored); Iniesta (penalty scored); Piqué (penalty scored); Ramos (penalty scored); Mata (penalty scored); Busquets (penalty scored); Navas (penalty scored)	7–6	(penalty scored) Candreva; (penalty scored) Aquilani; (penalty scored) De Rossi; (penalty scored) Giovinco; (penalty scored) Pirlo; (penalty scored) Montolivo; (penalty missed) Bonucci

Estádio Castelão, Fortaleza
Attendance: 56,083
Referee: Howard Webb (England)

=== Final ===
30 June 2013
19:00

Brazil	3–0	Spain
Fred 2', 48'; Neymar 44'	Report

Estádio do Maracanã, Rio de Janeiro
Attendance: 73,531
Referee: Björn Kuipers (Netherlands)

== Goalscorers ==
Rank	Player	Goals	Confederations Cup
1	Fernando Torres	8	2009 (3) and 2013 (5)
2	David Villa	6	2009 (3) and 2013 (3)
3	Jordi Alba	2	2013
3	Dani Güiza	2	2009
3	David Silva	2	2013
4
4	Xabi Alonso	1	2009
4	Cesc Fàbregas	1	2009
4	Fernando Llorente	1	2013
4	Juan Mata	1	2013
4	Pedro	1	2013
4	Roberto Soldado	1	2013

== See also ==
- Spain at the FIFA World Cup
- Spain at the UEFA European Championship
