= Spain at the UEFA European Championship =

International football delegation

The UEFA European Championship is the main football competition of the men's national teams governed by UEFA (the Union of European Football Associations). Held every four years since 1960, in the even-numbered year between World Cup tournaments, it was originally called the UEFA European Nations' Cup, changing to the current name in 1968. Starting with the 1996 tournament, specific championships are often referred to in the form "UEFA Euro (year)”. Prior to entering the tournament, all teams other than the host nations (which qualify automatically) compete in a qualifying process.

Spain have participated in twelve European Championships, from which they won four titles. Spain became European champions as hosts in 1964, in 2008 in Austria and Switzerland, in 2012 in Poland and Ukraine, and in 2024 in Germany. They are currently the only team with four titles, the only side to win two consecutive editions and the only side to ever win all seven matches in a single tournament (2024). They also set a new record of 15 goals scored in a single European Championship.

== Overall record ==
UEFA European Championship record									Qualification record					
Year	Result	Position	Pld	W	D*	L	GF	GA	Pld	W	D	L	GF	GA
(France) 1960	Did not qualify (Note: Spain were disqualified and the Soviet Union were awarded a walkover in the quarter-finals. Only four teams qualified for the final tournament.)								2	2	0	0	7	2
(Spain) 1964	Champions	1st	2	2	0	0	4	2	6	4	1	1	16	5
(Italy) 1968	Did not qualify								8	3	2	3	7	5
(Belgium) 1972	Did not qualify								6	3	2	1	14	3
(Socialist Federal Republic of Yugoslavia) 1976	Did not qualify								8	3	4	1	11	9
(Italy) 1980	Group stage	7th	3	0	1	2	2	4	6	4	1	1	13	5
(France) 1984	Runners-up	2nd	5	1	3	1	4	5	8	6	1	1	24	8
(West Germany) 1988	Group stage	6th	3	1	0	2	3	5	6	5	0	1	14	6
(Sweden) 1992	Did not qualify								7	3	0	4	17	12
(England) 1996	Quarter-finals	6th	4	1	3	0	4	3	10	8	2	0	25	4
(Belgium) (Netherlands) 2000	Quarter-finals	5th	4	2	0	2	7	7	8	7	0	1	42	5
(Portugal) 2004	Group stage	10th	3	1	1	1	2	2	10	7	2	1	21	5
(Austria) (Switzerland) 2008	Champions	1st	6	5	1	0	12	3	12	9	1	2	23	8
(Poland) (Ukraine) 2012	Champions	1st	6	4	2	0	12	1	8	8	0	0	26	6
(France) 2016	Round of 16	10th	4	2	0	2	5	4	10	9	0	1	23	3
(European Union) 2020	Semi-finals	3rd	6	2	4	0	13	6	10	8	2	0	31	5
(Germany) 2024	Champions	1st	7	7	0	0	15	4	8	7	0	1	25	5
(United Kingdom) (Republic of Ireland) 2028	To be determined								To be determined					
(Italy) (Turkey) 2032	To be determined								To be determined					
Total	4 Titles	12/17	53	28	15	10	83	46	133	96	18	19	339	96

Spain's European Championship record
First Match	Spain 2–1 Hungary (Madrid, Spain; 17 June 1964)
Biggest Win	Slovakia 0–5 Spain (Seville, Spain; 23 June 2021)
Biggest Defeat	France 2–0 Spain (Paris, France; 27 June 1984); Germany 2–0 Spain (Munich, Germany; 17 June 1988); Italy 2–0 Spain (Saint-Denis, France; 27 June 2016)
Best Result	Champions (1964, 2008, 2012 and 2024)
Worst Result	Group stage (1980, 1988 and 2004)

== List of matches ==
Year	Round	Opponent	Score	Spain scorer(s)
1964	Semi-finals	Hungary	2–1 (a.e.t.)	Pereda, Amancio
1964	Final	Soviet Union	2–1	Pereda, Marcelino
1980	Group stage	Italy	0–0	—
1980	Group stage	Belgium	1–2	Quini
1980	Group stage	England	1–2	Dani
1984	Group stage	Romania	1–1	Carrasco
1984	Group stage	Portugal	1–1	Santillana
1984	Group stage	West Germany	1–0	Maceda
1984	Semi-finals	Denmark	1–1 (a.e.t.) (5–4 p)	Maceda
1984	Final	France	0–2	—
1988	Group stage	Denmark	3–2	Míchel, Butragueño, Gordillo
1988	Group stage	Italy	0–1	—
1988	Group stage	West Germany	0–2	—
1996	Group stage	Bulgaria	1–1	Alfonso
1996	Group stage	France	1–1	Caminero
1996	Group stage	Romania	2–1	Manjarín, Amor
1996	Quarter-finals	England	0–0 (a.e.t.) (2–4 p)	—
2000	Group stage	Norway	0–1	—
2000	Group stage	Slovenia	2–1	Raúl, Etxeberria
2000	Group stage	FR Yugoslavia	4–3	Alfonso (2), Munitis, Mendieta
2000	Quarter-finals	France	1–2	Mendieta
2004	Group stage	Russia	1–0	Valerón
2004	Group stage	Greece	1–1	Morientes
2004	Group stage	Portugal	0–1	—
2008	Group stage	Russia	4–1	Villa (3), Fàbregas
2008	Group stage	Sweden	2–1	Fern. Torres, Villa
2008	Group stage	Greece	2–1	De la Red, Güiza
2008	Quarter-finals	Italy	0–0 (a.e.t.) (4–2 p)	—
2008	Semi-finals	Russia	3–0	Xavi, Güiza, Silva
2008	Final	Germany	1–0	Fern. Torres
2012	Group stage	Italy	1–1	Fàbregas
2012	Group stage	Republic of Ireland	4–0	Fern. Torres (2), Silva, Fàbregas
2012	Group stage	Croatia	1–0	Navas
2012	Quarter-finals	France	2–0	Alonso (2)
2012	Semi-finals	Portugal	0–0 (a.e.t.) (4–2 p)	—
2012	Final	Italy	4–0	Silva, Alba, Fern. Torres, Mata
2016	Group stage	Czech Republic	1–0	Piqué
2016	Group stage	Turkey	3–0	Morata (2), Nolito
2016	Group stage	Croatia	1–2	Morata
2016	Round of 16	Italy	0–2	—
2020	Group stage	Sweden	0–0	—
2020	Group stage	Poland	1–1	Morata
2020	Group stage	Slovakia	5–0	Dúbravka (o.g.), Laporte, Sarabia, Ferr. Torres, Kucka (o.g.)
2020	Round of 16	Croatia	5–3 (a.e.t.)	Sarabia, Azpilicueta, Ferr. Torres, Morata, Oyarzabal
2020	Quarter-finals	Switzerland	1–1 (a.e.t.) (3–1 p)	Zakaria (o.g.)
2020	Semi-finals	Italy	1–1 (a.e.t.) (2–4 p)	Morata
2024	Group stage	Croatia	3–0	Morata, Fabián, Carvajal
2024	Group stage	Italy	1–0	Calafiori (o.g.)
2024	Group stage	Albania	1–0	Ferr. Torres
2024	Round of 16	Georgia	4–1	Rodri, Fabián, Williams, Olmo
2024	Quarter-finals	Germany	2–1 (a.e.t.)	Olmo, Merino
2024	Semi-finals	France	2–1	Yamal, Olmo
2024	Final	England	2–1	Williams, Oyarzabal

== 1964 European Nations' Cup ==
=== Final tournament ===
Semi-finals

17 June 1964
20:00

Spain	2–1 (a.e.t.)	Hungary
Pereda 35'; Amancio 112'	Report	Bene 84'

Santiago Bernabéu, Madrid
Attendance: 34,713
Referee: Arthur Blavier (Belgium)

Final

21 June 1964
18:30

Spain	2–1	Soviet Union
Pereda 6'; Marcelino 84'	Report, lineups	Khusainov 8'

Santiago Bernabéu, Madrid
Attendance: 79,115
Referee: Arthur Holland (England)

== Euro 1980 ==
=== Group stage ===
Pos	Team	Pld	W	D	L	GF	GA	GD	Pts	Qualification
1	Belgium	3	1	2	0	3	2	+1	4	Advance to final
2	Italy (H)	3	1	2	0	1	0	+1	4	Advance to third place play-off
3	England	3	1	1	1	3	3	0	3	
4	Spain	3	0	1	2	2	4	−2	1	

Source: UEFA
Rules for classification: Group stage tiebreakers
(H) Hosts
12 June 1980
20:30

Spain	0–0	Italy
	Report

San Siro, Milan
Attendance: 46,337
Referee: Károly Palotai (Hungary)

15 June 1980
17:45

Belgium	2–1	Spain
Gerets 17'; Cools 65'	Report	Quini 36'

San Siro, Milan
Attendance: 11,430
Referee: Charles Corver (Netherlands)

18 June 1980
17:45

Spain	1–2	England
Dani 48' (pen.)	Report	Brooking 19'; Woodcock 61'

Stadio San Paolo, Naples
Attendance: 14,440
Referee: Erich Linemayr (Austria)

== Euro 1984 ==
=== Group stage ===
Pos	Team	Pld	W	D	L	GF	GA	GD	Pts	Qualification
1	Spain	3	1	2	0	3	2	+1	4	Advance to knockout stage
2	Portugal	3	1	2	0	2	1	+1	4	Advance to knockout stage
3	West Germany	3	1	1	1	2	2	0	3	
4	Romania	3	0	1	2	2	4	−2	1	

Source: UEFA
Rules for classification: Group stage tiebreakers
14 June 1984
20:30

Romania	1–1	Spain
Bölöni 35'	Report	Carrasco 22' (pen.)

Stade Geoffroy-Guichard, Saint-Étienne
Attendance: 16,972
Referee: Alexis Ponnet (Belgium)

17 June 1984
20:30

Portugal	1–1	Spain
Sousa 52'	Report	Santillana 73'

Stade Vélodrome, Marseille
Attendance: 24,364
Referee: Michel Vautrot (France)

20 June 1984
20:30

West Germany	0–1	Spain
	Report	Maceda 90'

Parc des Princes, Paris
Attendance: 47,691
Referee: Vojtech Christov (Czechoslovakia)

=== Knockout stage ===
Semi-finals

24 June 1984
20:00

Denmark	1–1 (a.e.t.)	Spain
Lerby 7'	Report	Maceda 67'
Penalties
Brylle (penalty scored); J. Olsen (penalty scored); Laudrup (penalty scored); Lerby (penalty scored); Elkjær (penalty missed)	4–5	(penalty scored) Santillana; (penalty scored) Señor; (penalty scored) Urquiaga; (penalty scored) Víctor; (penalty scored) Sarabia

Stade de Gerland, Lyon
Attendance: 47,843
Referee: George Courtney (England)

Final

27 June 1984
20:00

France	2–0	Spain
Platini 57'; Bellone 90'	Report

Parc des Princes, Paris
Attendance: 47,368
Referee: Vojtech Christov (Czechoslovakia)

== Euro 1988 ==
=== Group stage ===
Pos	Team	Pld	W	D	L	GF	GA	GD	Pts	Qualification
1	West Germany (H)	3	2	1	0	5	1	+4	5	Advance to knockout stage
2	Italy	3	2	1	0	4	1	+3	5	Advance to knockout stage
3	Spain	3	1	0	2	3	5	−2	2	
4	Denmark	3	0	0	3	2	7	−5	0	

Source: UEFA
Rules for classification: Group stage tiebreakers
(H) Hosts
11 June 1988
15:30

Denmark	2–3	Spain
Laudrup 24'; Povlsen 82'	Report	Míchel 5'; Butragueño 53'; Gordillo 66'

Niedersachsenstadion, Hanover
Attendance: 55,707
Referee: Bep Thomas (Netherlands)

14 June 1988
20:15

Italy	1–0	Spain
Vialli 73'	Report

Waldstadion, Frankfurt
Attendance: 47,506
Referee: Erik Fredriksson (Sweden)

17 June 1988
20:15

West Germany	2–0	Spain
Völler 29', 51'	Report

Olympiastadion, Munich
Attendance: 63,802
Referee: Michel Vautrot (France)

== Euro 1996 ==
=== Group stage ===
Pos	Team	Pld	W	D	L	GF	GA	GD	Pts	Qualification
1	France	3	2	1	0	5	2	+3	7	Advance to knockout stage
2	Spain	3	1	2	0	4	3	+1	5	Advance to knockout stage
3	Bulgaria	3	1	1	1	3	4	−1	4	
4	Romania	3	0	0	3	1	4	−3	0	

Source: UEFA
Rules for classification: Group stage tiebreakers
9 June 1996
14:30

Spain	1–1	Bulgaria
Alfonso 74'	Report	Stoichkov 65' (pen.)

Elland Road, Leeds
Attendance: 24,006
Referee: Piero Ceccarini (Italy)

15 June 1996
18:00

France	1–1	Spain
Djorkaeff 48'	Report	Caminero 85'

Elland Road, Leeds
Attendance: 35,626
Referee: Vadim Zhuk (Belarus)

18 June 1996
16:30

Romania	1–2	Spain
Răducioiu 29'	Report	Manjarín 11'; Amor 84'

Elland Road, Leeds
Attendance: 32,719
Referee: Ahmet Çakar (Turkey)

=== Knockout stage ===
Quarter-finals

22 June 1996
15:00

Spain	0–0 (a.e.t.)	England
	Report
Penalties
Hierro (penalty missed); Amor (penalty scored); Belsué (penalty scored); Nadal (penalty missed)	2–4	(penalty scored) Shearer; (penalty scored) Platt; (penalty scored) Pearce; (penalty scored) Gascoigne

Wembley Stadium, London
Attendance: 75,440
Referee: Marc Batta (France)

== Euro 2000 ==
=== Group stage ===
Pos	Team	Pld	W	D	L	GF	GA	GD	Pts	Qualification
1	Spain	3	2	0	1	6	5	+1	6	Advance to knockout stage
2	FR Yugoslavia	3	1	1	1	7	7	0	4 (Note: Head-to-head result: Norway 0–1 FR Yugoslavia.)	Advance to knockout stage
3	Norway	3	1	1	1	1	1	0	4	
4	Slovenia	3	0	2	1	4	5	−1	2	

Source: UEFA
Rules for classification: Group stage tiebreakers
Notes:
13 June 2000
18:00

Spain	0–1	Norway
	Report	Iversen 65'

Feijenoord Stadion, Rotterdam
Attendance: 41,000
Referee: Gamal Al-Ghandour (Egypt)

18 June 2000
18:00

Slovenia	1–2	Spain
Zahovič 59'	Report	Raúl 4'; Etxeberria 60'

Amsterdam Arena, Amsterdam
Attendance: 51,300
Referee: Markus Merk (Germany)

21 June 2000
18:00

FR Yugoslavia	3–4	Spain
Milošević 30'; Govedarica 50'; Komljenović 75'	Report	Alfonso 38', 90+5'; Munitis 51'; Mendieta 90+4' (pen.)

Jan Breydel Stadium, Bruges
Attendance: 26,611
Referee: Gilles Veissière (France)

=== Knockout stage ===
Quarter-finals

25 June 2000
20:45

Spain	1–2	France
Mendieta 38' (pen.)	Report	Zidane 32'; Djorkaeff 44'

Jan Breydel Stadium, Bruges
Attendance: 26,614
Referee: Pierluigi Collina (Italy)

== Euro 2004 ==
=== Group stage ===
Pos	Team	Pld	W	D	L	GF	GA	GD	Pts	Qualification
1	Portugal (H)	3	2	0	1	4	2	+2	6	Advance to knockout stage
2	Greece	3	1	1	1	4	4	0	4 (Note: Tied on head-to-head result (Greece 1–1 Spain) and overall goal difference (0). Overall goals for was used as the tiebreaker.)	Advance to knockout stage
3	Spain	3	1	1	1	2	2	0	4	
4	Russia	3	1	0	2	2	4	−2	3	

Source: UEFA
Rules for classification: Group stage tiebreakers
(H) Hosts
Notes:
12 June 2004
19:45

Spain	1–0	Russia
Valerón 60'	Report

Estádio Algarve, Faro/Loulé
Attendance: 28,182
Referee: Urs Meier (Switzerland)

16 June 2004
17:00

Greece	1–1	Spain
Charisteas 66'	Report	Morientes 28'

Estádio do Bessa, Porto
Attendance: 25,444
Referee: Ľuboš Micheľ (Slovakia)

20 June 2004
19:45

Spain	0–1	Portugal
	Report	Nuno Gomes 57'

Estádio José Alvalade, Lisbon
Attendance: 47,491
Referee: Anders Frisk (Sweden)

== Euro 2008 ==
=== Group stage ===
Pos	Team	Pld	W	D	L	GF	GA	GD	Pts	Qualification
1	Spain	3	3	0	0	8	3	+5	9	Advance to knockout stage
2	Russia	3	2	0	1	4	4	0	6	Advance to knockout stage
3	Sweden	3	1	0	2	3	4	−1	3	
4	Greece	3	0	0	3	1	5	−4	0	

Source: UEFA
Rules for classification: Group stage tiebreakers
10 June 2008
18:00

Spain	4–1	Russia
Villa 20', 44', 75'; Fàbregas 90+1'	Report	Pavlyuchenko 86'

Tivoli-Neu, Innsbruck
Attendance: 30,772
Referee: Konrad Plautz (Austria)

14 June 2008
18:00

Sweden	1–2	Spain
Ibrahimović 34'	Report	Torres 15'; Villa 90+2'

Tivoli-Neu, Innsbruck
Attendance: 30,772
Referee: Pieter Vink (Netherlands)

18 June 2008
20:45

Greece	1–2	Spain
Charisteas 42'	Report	De la Red 61'; Güiza 88'

Stadion Wals-Siezenheim, Salzburg
Attendance: 30,883
Referee: Howard Webb (England)

=== Knockout stage ===
Quarter-finals

22 June 2008
20:45

Spain	0–0 (a.e.t.)	Italy
	Report
Penalties
Villa (penalty scored); Cazorla (penalty scored); Senna (penalty scored); Güiza (penalty missed); Fàbregas (penalty scored)	4–2	(penalty scored) Grosso; (penalty missed) De Rossi; (penalty scored) Camoranesi; (penalty missed) Di Natale

Ernst-Happel-Stadion, Vienna
Attendance: 51,178
Referee: Herbert Fandel (Germany)

Semi-finals

26 June 2008
20:45

Russia	0–3	Spain
	Report	Xavi 50'; Güiza 73'; Silva 82'

Ernst-Happel-Stadion, Vienna
Attendance: 51,428
Referee: Frank De Bleeckere (Belgium)

Final

29 June 2008
20:45

Germany	0–1	Spain
	Report	Torres 33'

Ernst-Happel-Stadion, Vienna
Attendance: 51,428
Referee: Roberto Rosetti (Italy)

== Euro 2012 ==
=== Group stage ===
Pos	Team	Pld	W	D	L	GF	GA	GD	Pts	Qualification
1	Spain	3	2	1	0	6	1	+5	7	Advance to knockout stage
2	Italy	3	1	2	0	4	2	+2	5	Advance to knockout stage
3	Croatia	3	1	1	1	4	3	+1	4	
4	Republic of Ireland	3	0	0	3	1	9	−8	0	

Source: UEFA
Rules for classification: Group stage tiebreakers
10 June 2012
18:00 CEST

Spain	1–1	Italy
Fàbregas 64'	Report	Di Natale 61'

PGE Arena, Gdańsk
Attendance: 38,869
Referee: Viktor Kassai (Hungary)

14 June 2012
20:45 CEST

Spain	4–0	Republic of Ireland
Torres 4', 70'; Silva 49'; Fàbregas 83'	Report

PGE Arena, Gdańsk
Attendance: 39,150
Referee: Pedro Proença (Portugal)

18 June 2012
20:45 CEST

Croatia	0–1	Spain
	Report	Navas 88'

PGE Arena, Gdańsk
Attendance: 39,076
Referee: Wolfgang Stark (Germany)

=== Knockout stage ===
Quarter-finals

23 June 2012
21:45 EEST

Spain	2–0	France
Alonso 19', 90+1' (pen.)	Report

Donbas Arena, Donetsk
Attendance: 47,000
Referee: Nicola Rizzoli (Italy)

Semi-finals

27 June 2012
21:45 EEST

Portugal	0–0 (a.e.t.)	Spain
	Report
Penalties
Moutinho (penalty missed); Pepe (penalty scored); Nani (penalty scored); Alves (penalty missed)	2–4	(penalty missed) Alonso; (penalty scored) Iniesta; (penalty scored) Piqué; (penalty scored) Ramos; (penalty scored) Fàbregas

Donbas Arena, Donetsk
Attendance: 48,000
Referee: Cüneyt Çakır (Turkey)

Final

1 July 2012
21:45 EEST

Spain	4–0	Italy
Silva 14'; Alba 41'; Torres 84'; Mata 88'	Report

Olympic Stadium, Kyiv
Attendance: 63,170
Referee: Pedro Proença (Portugal)

== Euro 2016 ==
=== Group stage ===
Pos	Team	Pld	W	D	L	GF	GA	GD	Pts	Qualification
1	Croatia	3	2	1	0	5	3	+2	7	Advance to knockout stage
2	Spain	3	2	0	1	5	2	+3	6	Advance to knockout stage
3	Turkey	3	1	0	2	2	4	−2	3	
4	Czech Republic	3	0	1	2	2	5	−3	1	

Source: UEFA
Rules for classification: Group stage tiebreakers
13 June 2016
15:00

Spain	1–0	Czech Republic
Piqué 87'	Report

Stadium Municipal, Toulouse
Attendance: 29,400
Referee: Szymon Marciniak (Poland)

17 June 2016
21:00

Spain	3–0	Turkey
Morata 34', 48'; Nolito 37'	Report

Stade de Nice, Nice
Attendance: 33,409
Referee: Milorad Mažić (Serbia)

21 June 2016
21:00

Croatia	2–1	Spain
N. Kalinić 45'; Perišić 87'	Report	Morata 7'

Stade de Bordeaux, Bordeaux
Attendance: 37,245
Referee: Björn Kuipers (Netherlands)

=== Knockout stage ===
Round of 16

27 June 2016
18:00

Italy	2–0	Spain
Chiellini 33'; Pellè 90+1'	Report

Stade de France, Saint-Denis
Attendance: 76,165
Referee: Cüneyt Çakır (Turkey)

== Euro 2020 ==
=== Group stage ===
Pos	Team	Pld	W	D	L	GF	GA	GD	Pts	Qualification
1	Sweden	3	2	1	0	4	2	+2	7	Advance to knockout stage
2	Spain (H)	3	1	2	0	6	1	+5	5	Advance to knockout stage
3	Slovakia	3	1	0	2	2	7	−5	3	
4	Poland	3	0	1	2	4	6	−2	1	

Source: UEFA
Rules for classification: Group stage tiebreakers
(H) Hosts
14 June 2021
21:00

Spain	0–0	Sweden
	Report

Estadio de La Cartuja, Seville
Attendance: 10,559
Referee: Slavko Vinčić (Slovenia)

19 June 2021
21:00

Spain	1–1	Poland
Morata 25'	Report	Lewandowski 54'

Estadio de La Cartuja, Seville
Attendance: 11,742
Referee: Daniele Orsato (Italy)

23 June 2021
18:00

Slovakia	0–5	Spain
	Report	Dúbravka 30' (o.g.); Laporte 45+3'; Sarabia 56'; F. Torres 67'; Kucka 71' (o.g.)

Estadio de La Cartuja, Seville
Attendance: 11,204
Referee: Björn Kuipers (Netherlands)

=== Knockout stage ===
Round of 16

28 June 2021
18:00

Croatia	3–5 (a.e.t.)	Spain
Pedri 20' (o.g.); Oršić 85'; Pašalić 90+2'	Report	Sarabia 38'; Azpilicueta 57'; F. Torres 77'; Morata 100'; Oyarzabal 103'

Parken Stadium, Copenhagen
Attendance: 22,771
Referee: Cüneyt Çakır (Turkey)

Quarter-finals

2 July 2021
18:00 (19:00 UTC+3)

Switzerland	1–1 (a.e.t.)	Spain
Shaqiri 68'	Report	Zakaria 8' (o.g.)
Penalties
Gavranović (penalty scored); Schär (penalty missed); Akanji (penalty missed); Vargas (penalty missed)	1–3	(penalty missed) Busquets; (penalty scored) Olmo; (penalty missed) Rodri; (penalty scored) Gerard; (penalty scored) Oyarzabal

Krestovsky Stadium, Saint Petersburg
Attendance: 24,764
Referee: Michael Oliver (England)

Semi-finals

6 July 2021
21:00 (20:00 UTC+1)

Italy	1–1 (a.e.t.)	Spain
Chiesa 60'	Report	Morata 80'
Penalties
Locatelli (penalty missed); Belotti (penalty scored); Bonucci (penalty scored); Bernardeschi (penalty scored); Jorginho (penalty scored)	4–2	(penalty missed) Olmo; (penalty scored) Gerard; (penalty scored) Thiago; (penalty missed) Morata

Wembley Stadium, London
Attendance: 57,811
Referee: Felix Brych (Germany)

== Euro 2024 ==
=== Group stage ===
Pos	Team	Pld	W	D	L	GF	GA	GD	Pts	Qualification
1	Spain	3	3	0	0	5	0	+5	9	Advance to knockout stage
2	Italy	3	1	1	1	3	3	0	4	Advance to knockout stage
3	Croatia	3	0	2	1	3	6	−3	2	
4	Albania	3	0	1	2	3	5	−2	1	

Source: UEFA
15 June 2024
18:00

Spain	3–0	Croatia
Morata 29'; Fabián 32'; Carvajal 45+2'	Report

Olympiastadion, Berlin
Attendance: 68,844
Referee: Michael Oliver (England)

20 June 2024
21:00

Spain	1–0	Italy
Calafiori 55' (o.g.)	Report

Arena AufSchalke, Gelsenkirchen
Attendance: 49,528
Referee: Slavko Vinčić (Slovenia)

24 June 2024
21:00

Albania	0–1	Spain
	Report	Torres 13'

Merkur Spiel-Arena, Düsseldorf
Attendance: 46,586
Referee: Glenn Nyberg (Sweden)

=== Knockout stage ===
Round of 16

30 June 2024
21:00

Spain	4–1	Georgia
Rodri 39'; Fabián 51'; Williams 75'; Olmo 83'	Report	Le Normand 18' (o.g.)

RheinEnergieStadion, Cologne
Attendance: 42,233
Referee: François Letexier (France)

Quarter-finals

5 July 2024
18:00

Spain	2–1 (a.e.t.)	Germany
Olmo 51'; Merino 119'	Report	Wirtz 89'

MHPArena, Stuttgart
Attendance: 54,000
Referee: Anthony Taylor (England)

Semi-finals

9 July 2024
21:00

Spain	2–1	France
Yamal 21'; Olmo 25'	Report	Kolo Muani 9'

Allianz Arena, Munich
Attendance: 62,042
Referee: Slavko Vinčić (Slovenia)

Final

14 July 2024
21:00

Spain	2–1	England
Williams 47'; Oyarzabal 86'	Report	Palmer 73'

Olympiastadion, Berlin
Attendance: 65,600
Referee: François Letexier (France)

== Goalscorers ==
Player	Goals	1964	1980	1984	1988	1996	2000	2004	2008	2012	2016	2020	2024
Álvaro Morata	7										3	3	1
Fernando Torres	5								2	3			
David Villa	4								4				
Alfonso	3					1	2						
Cesc Fàbregas	3								1	2			
Dani Olmo	3												3
David Silva	3								1	2			
Ferran Torres	3											2	1
Xabi Alonso	2									2			
Daniel Güiza	2								2				
Antonio Maceda	2			2									
Gaizka Mendieta	2						2						
Mikel Oyarzabal	2											1	1
Chus Pereda	2	2											
Fabián Ruiz	2												2
Pablo Sarabia	2											2	
Nico Williams	2												2
Jordi Alba	1									1			
Amancio	1	1											
César Azpilicueta	1											1	
Emilio Butragueño	1				1								
Fernando Morientes	1							1					
Guillermo Amor	1					1							
José Luis Caminero	1					1							
Dani Carvajal	1												1
Lobo Carrasco	1			1									
Dani	1		1										
Rubén de la Red	1								1				
Joseba Etxeberria	1						1						
Rafael Gordillo	1				1								
Aymeric Laporte	1											1	
Javier Manjarín	1					1							
Marcelino	1	1											
Juan Mata	1									1			
Mikel Merino	1												1
Míchel	1				1								
Pedro Munitis	1						1						
Jesús Navas	1									1			
Nolito	1										1		
Gerard Piqué	1										1		
Quini	1		1										
Raúl	1						1						
Rodri	1												1
Santillana	1			1									
Juan Carlos Valerón	1							1					
Xavi	1								1				
Lamine Yamal	1												1
Own goals	4											3	1
Total	83	4	2	4	3	4	7	2	12	12	5	13	15

== See also ==
- Spain at the FIFA Confederations Cup
- Spain at the FIFA World Cup

== Head-to-head record ==
Opponent	Pld	W	D	L	GF	GA	GD	Win %
Albania	1	1	0	0	1	0	+1	100.00
Belgium	1	0	0	1	1	2	−1	0.00
Bulgaria	1	0	1	0	1	1	+0	0.00
Croatia	4	3	0	1	10	5	+5	75.00
Czech Republic	1	1	0	0	1	0	+1	100.00
Denmark	2	1	1	0	4	3	+1	50.00
England	3	1	1	1	3	3	+0	33.33
France	5	2	1	2	6	6	+0	40.00
Georgia	1	1	0	0	4	1	+3	100.00
Germany	4	3	0	1	4	3	+1	75.00
Greece	2	1	1	0	3	2	+1	50.00
Hungary	1	1	0	0	2	1	+1	100.00
Italy	8	2	4	2	7	5	+2	25.00
Norway	1	0	0	1	0	1	−1	0.00
Poland	1	0	1	0	1	1	+0	0.00
Portugal	3	0	2	1	1	2	−1	0.00
Republic of Ireland	1	1	0	0	4	0	+4	100.00
Romania	2	1	1	0	3	2	+1	50.00
Russia	4	4	0	0	10	2	+8	100.00
Serbia	1	1	0	0	4	3	+1	100.00
Slovakia	1	1	0	0	5	0	+5	100.00
Slovenia	1	1	0	0	2	1	+1	100.00
Sweden	2	1	1	0	2	1	+1	50.00
Switzerland	1	0	1	0	1	1	+0	0.00
Turkey	1	1	0	0	3	0	+3	100.00
Total	53	28	15	10	83	46	+37	52.83
