= Anna Cabré =

Catalan geographer, professor (born 1943)

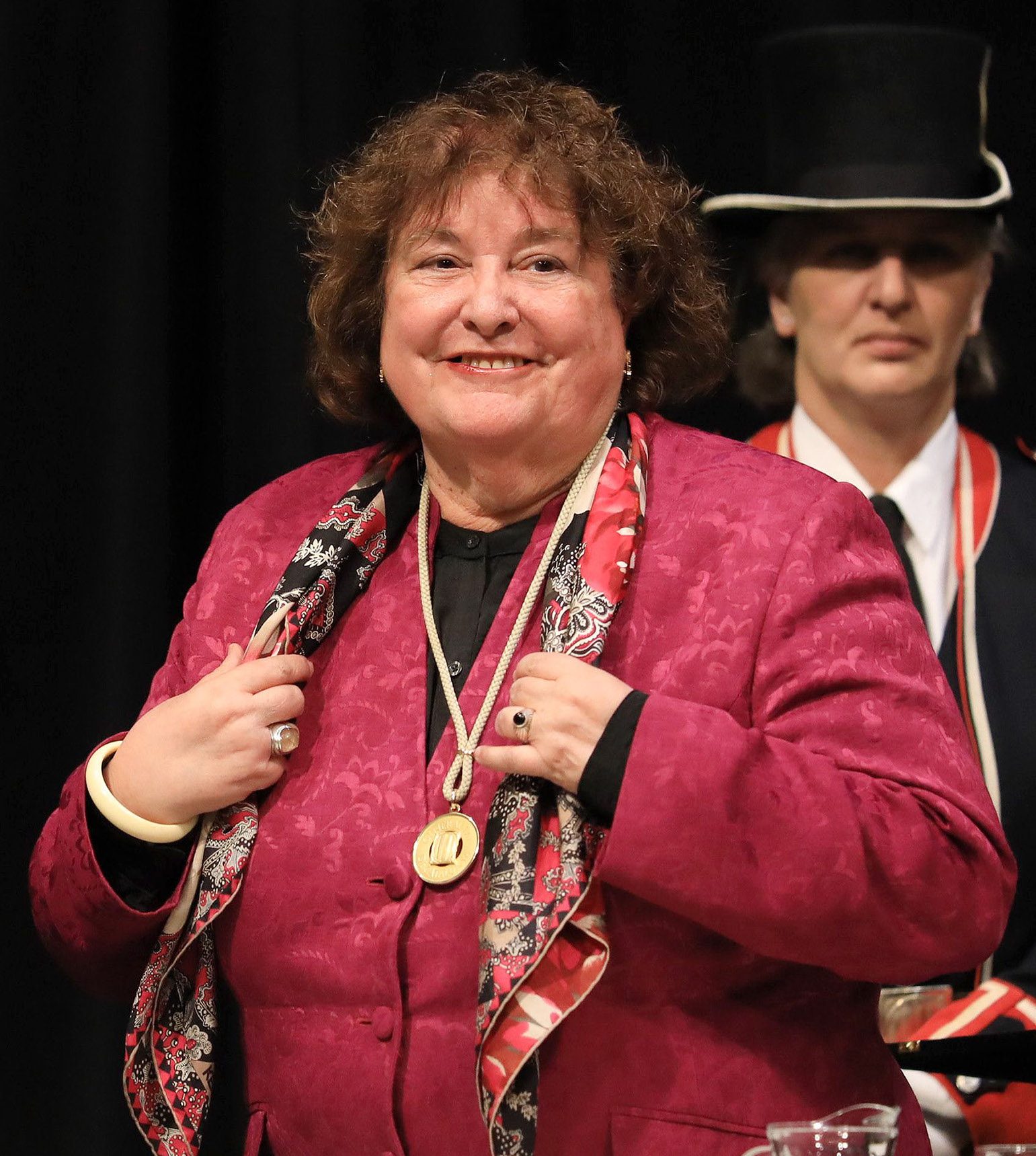
- Cabré receiving the Gold Medal from the Generalitat, December 2019
- Born: 18 October 1943 (age 82); Barcelona, Spain
- Other name: Anna Cabré i Pla
- Education: Sorbonne University; Autonomous University of Barcelona
- Occupations: Geographer, professor
- Children: 2

Anna Cabré also known as Anna Cabré i Pla (born 1943) is a Catalan geographer and professor emeritus of Human Geography at the Autonomous University of Barcelona (UAB). She is a demographer who served as director of the Center for Demographic Studies at the UAB, from its creation in 1984 until 2014, and then became its honorary director. She is considered an expert on the dynamics of marriage demographics.

== Biography ==
Cabré was born 18 October 1943, in Barcelona, Spain. In 1961, she won a pre-university scholarship at 17 and went to the United States to study. On her return at 19, she married a Spaniard who was living in Paris because he had political refugee status in France. She lived there for 14 years.

She studied Political Science and Economics at the Institute of Demography of the Sorbonne University in 1967, where she worked with Alfred Sauvy, Louis Henry and Roland Pressat. She then taught demographic analysis at University of Montreal (1969), University of Chicago (1969), Sorbonne University (1970), Paris Nanterre University (1970–1978) and the College of Mexico (1973 and 1981).

In 1978, she became a professor at the Autonomous University of Barcelona (UAB) and received her doctorate in 1989 at UAB. In 1984, she was named the director of the Center for Demographic Studies and authored numerous articles on demography. Her professional career has been closely linked to Jordi Nadal, and she has collaborated on several occasions with Isabel Pujadas i Rúbies. Her primary interest is in demographic prospects and historical geography of the population of Catalonia. She has appeared, as an expert, in several commissions of the Spanish Congress of Deputies and the Parliament of Catalonia.

In 2010, Cabré became a member of the Institute of Catalan Studies, forming part of the Philosophy and Social Sciences Section. She remains an honorary director of the Center for Demographic Studies and is a professor emeritus at Autonomous University of Barcelona.

== Selected awards and honors ==
Cabré has received several honors for her work.

- 2019 - Gold Medal of the Generalitat de Catalunya
- 2010 - Honorary Member of the College of Economists of Catalonia
- 2010 - Full member of the Institute for Catalan Studies
- 2005 - Medal of Sant Jordi awarded by the Generalitat de Catalunya
- 2003 - Distinction from the Generalitat de Catalunya for the Promotion of University Research
- 1994 - Narcís Monturiol Medal for scientific and technological merit, awarded by the Generalitat de Catalunya
- 1990 - Jaume Carner Prize awarded by the Institute of Catalan Studies for the Doctoral Thesis The Reproduction of the Catalan Generations 1856–1960

== Selected works ==
- Alabart, Anna, Anna Cabré, A. Domingo, and N. Castells. Changing Patterns in Household Formation in Barcelona and Madrid: 1985. Centre d'Estudis Demogràfics, 1986.
- Cabré, Anna, Anna Alabart, Núria Castells, Andreu Domingo, Fabré Assumpta, and Verena Stolcke. "Changing Patterns in Household Formation in Barcelona and Madrid." In Lifestyles, Contraception and Parenthood, pp. 32–50. 1988.
- Cabré, Anna. "Facts and Factors on low fertility in Southern Europe: the case of Spain." (2003).
- Esteve, Albert, and Anna Cabré. "Marriage squeeze and changes in family formation: Historical comparative evidence in Spain, France, and United States in the XXth century." (2004).
- Jordà, Joan Pau, Joana Maria Pujadas-Mora, and Anna Cabré. "The Footprint of Migrations on Surnames: Onomastic Changes in the Barcelona Area in the Late Middle Ages (1451-1500)." Onoma 49 (2014): 105-136. (2014)
