= Jean Löring =

German footballer and manager (1934–2005)

Personal information
- Full name: Hans Löring
- Date of birth: 16 August 1934
- Place of birth: Cologne, Germany
- Date of death: 6 March 2005 (aged 70)
- Place of death: Cologne, Germany
- Position: Defender

Senior career*
| Years | Team | Apps | (Gls) |
| 1955–1957 | Preußen Dellbrück | | |
| 1957–1961 | Viktoria Köln | | |
| 1961–1962 | Alemannia Aachen | | |

Managerial career
- 1974: Fortuna Köln
- 1977: Fortuna Köln
- 1980: Fortuna Köln
- 1986–1987: Fortuna Köln
- 1989: Fortuna Köln
- * Club domestic league appearances and goals

Hans "Jean" Löring (16 August 1934 – 6 March 2005) was a German football player and entrepreneur best known for his role as chairman of SC Fortuna Köln, a role he filled for over 30 years, from 1967 to 2001. In the years before the introduction of the Bundesliga, he himself played in the Oberliga for Prussia Dellbrück, FC Viktoria Köln and Alemannia Aachen. After that he was a boxing manager for a time. As an entrepreneur, he was successful in electrical and pipeline construction, among other things.

== Biography ==
Born as Hans Löring, he himself took the name Jean which, in the local Cologne dialect, is pronounced Schäng. Löring, by trade, was an electrician and after his active career started an electrical business. He also dealt in real estate.

As a football player, Löring fielded for Preußen Dellbrück, later to become Viktoria Köln (1955–61), and Alemannia Aachen (1961–62), in the Oberliga West.

In 1967, he took over as chairman of Fortuna Köln. Throughout his time in this position, he is estimated to have supported the club with between DM 30 and 40 million, eventually leading to his own insolvency. After having to declare insolvency, Löring was rarely seen in public, as he felt embarrassed about it. His club, Fortuna Köln, was only able to survive in professional football through his financial help, rarely enjoying good support in Cologne and consequently, after his departure, the club itself became insolvent. Fortuna declined as far as the sixth division Verbandsliga but has since made a partial recovery.

In the time as chairman of the club, Fortuna's greatest success was reaching the Bundesliga in 1973, where it lasted for only one season, and making a losing appearance in the German Cup final in 1983, against local rival 1. FC Köln.

After that, he initially ended his active football career due to a hip joint injury. He then built up a business empire that later consisted of nine companies, the core of which was Hans Löring ELRO Elektro- und Rohrleitungsbau GmbH (1973: 300 employees). In 1966 he became president of SC Fortuna Köln, a position he held until 2001. In the first phase of his presidency, Löring also filled in as a player for the contract players' team, which has since been promoted to the Regionalliga West. He was a regular player and was used in 26 games in which he scored a goal. 1969/1970 followed another 9 and 1970/71 another three appearances, each without scoring, so that Löring completed a total of 38 regional league games for Fortuna. During his presidency, Fortuna made it from the district league to the next higher league every two years. In addition, Löring was manager of the Cologne boxing professional Jupp Elze, who died in 1968 as the German champion after a fight for European championship.

Löring spend his final years mostly alone, accompanied only by his four dogs.

== Character ==
Jean Löring was one of the most colorful figures in German football.

In December 1999, when his club was 0–2 behind against Waldhof Mannheim he sacked coach Toni Schumacher, the former national team goalkeeper, at half time. Because the assistant coach left with Schumacher he himself coached the team for the rest of the game and promptly lost 1–5. Throughout his time with Fortuna he took up the double role, serving as chairman and coach, on five occasions.

When Löring was banned from the stadium for a game because he verbally attacked a referee he decided to dress up as Santa Claus and watch the game from the stands without being identified.

Hans Krankl, who was briefly coach at Fortuna, when joining the club was told how difficult Löring was but found him to be one of the nicest people he ever met in football and described him as a grandfatherly figure.

In the early 1970s, he acquired the castle-like property Haus Kickley near Nideggen-Rath (Düren district), which was designed by the architect Paul Darius, from the Hoesch family of industrialists from Düren. The property was already used for representative purposes and many a lavish party on the occasion of the promotion to the Bundesliga in 1973. The cheetah "Fortuna" sometimes lived on the property, which Löring donated to the Cologne Zoo on behalf of the association after its successful promotion. In 1973 alone he supported Fortuna Cologne with around 2.5 million marks and included several players on his company's payroll. In 1975 he acquired shares in the then ailing Dorint hotel chain through the mediation of his friend and Cologne financial broker Herbert Ebertz.

In 1978 he had a tennis hall built on Vorgebirgstrasse opposite the Südstadion in Cologne – the home of his football club – in which his offices and the "Bacchus" club house were housed. At that time the stadium was under construction. After being relegated immediately, Fortuna then played uninterruptedly in the 2. Bundesliga for 26 years. The chance of renewed promotion was given away in 1986 in the relegation against Borussia Dortmund (2:0, 1:3, 0:8).

The greatest sporting success of Fortuna under his presidency was entering the DFB Pokal final on 11 June 1983 against 1. FC Köln, the first pure city derby in this competition (list of DFB-Pokal finals) - Fortuna lost to FC in the RheinEnergieStadion with 0:1. Löring also liked to refer to his Fortuna as his "Vereinche", and his involvement as the club's biggest patron is said to have cost him 15 million euros over the years. With the support of many volunteers, he created the largest youth department within the DFB during this time. Today's Fortuna has succeeded in maintaining and even expanding this large youth work for Cologne.

Löring signed the castle over to his wife Katharina "Käthe" Löring (born in 1934) in 1996, but secured a permanent right of residence. He suffered a heart attack in 1997 and largely withdrew from public life. In 1998 he separated from his wife and now lived with the entrepreneur Erika Wirtz. His largest company, ELRO, was in crisis from December 2000 and in May 2001 allegedly had tax debts amounting to DM 4.5 million.

Among others, Fortuna was coached by the Cologne soccer idols and ex-national players Bernd Schuster and Toni Schumacher at the beginning of their coaching career. Löring caused a stir when he dismissed Schumacher on 15 December 1999 during the half-time break in the game against SV Waldhof Mannheim when the score was 0-2 (final score 1-5). When asked by journalists about the unusual expulsion, he is said to have answered: "As a club, I had to react". Fortuna's debts continued to rise to seven million DM. On 1 April 2001, after insolvency proceedings, the association was finally debt-free; Löring gave up his presidency on 13 June 2001.

Löring promoted the musical singer Yana Kris-Molina (born in 1968 in London). Johannes Böhne, who started at Sparkasse KölnBonn in 1962, took over the position of managing director at Fortuna Köln in May 2001. The castle with a floor space of 608 m² and an associated park of 33,000 m² was foreclosed on in January 2003; the District Court of Düren had set the market value at EUR 2.7 million and the creditor bank BAG Bankaktiengesellschaft from Hamm was awarded the contract. With the award, Löring had lost his permanent right of residence, which was secured in the land register; the right of residence, capitalized at 383,000 euros, was bought by the bank in the bid. In 2009, the creditor bank was prepared to allow the castle, which had been vacant for six years, to be auctioned off for a minimum bid of EUR 995,000. After extensive restoration, it is now owned by the Cologne entrepreneur Enrico Drechsel. Fortuna's second bankruptcy followed in January 2003, and a third was unavoidable.

Due to the economic failure and his poor health - his cancer was diagnosed in 1997 after a heart attack - and not least due to his generosity towards his club, Löring had become almost penniless in the last years of his life. And the club was no longer doing well without the long-standing patron: Fortuna Köln fell into the fourth-tier Oberliga Nordrhein and had to stop playing there in the 2004/2005 season for financial reasons after only being able to score three points in the first half of the season. In February 2005, the team was deregistered from playing operations after the club had already filed for bankruptcy for the third time shortly before.

== Death ==
Löring, suffering from cancer, died at the Hospiz Dr.-Mildred-Scheel-Haus in Cologne on 6 March 2005. He was buried at the Südfriedhof, located in Köln-Zollstock.

After Löring's death it was discussed to rename the home of Fortuna, the Südstadion, after him. The city also marked out the way to his grave at Südfriedhof.

In October 2022, Cornel Wachter published the artist edition "LÖRING", the woodruff by FLIMM from Brühl near Cologne. Wachter's son had the idea of choosing the year SC Fortuna Köln was promoted to the first Bundesliga as the edition, 1973. For the first time, the premium product from FLIMM was rededicated, in homage to the lifetime achievements of the "eternal president" of the sports club Fortuna Köln "Hans". Schäng" Löring, who i.a. with its "Vereincher", as the Schäng called "his" club in Cologne dialect, was at times able to provide the largest youth department in German football. So Carl Flimm and the FLIMM family agreed to the request for a one-off relabelling. The designer Mathias Langer, a member of the "Schäng Gäng" fan club, designed the labels.
