= Ömer Diler =

Turkish academic

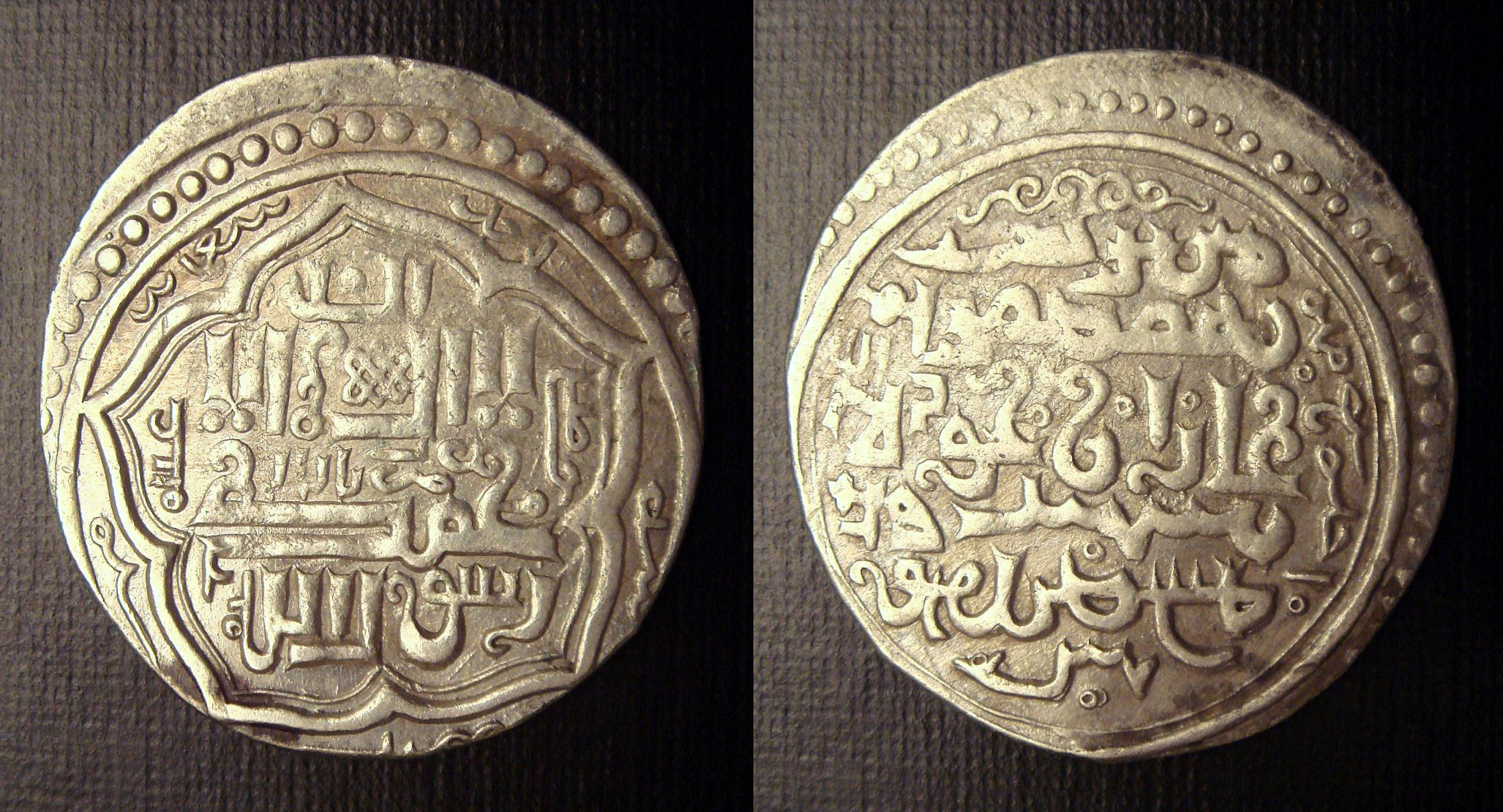
A two dirham coin of the Ilkhan Mahmud Ghazan.

Ömer Diler (1945, Istanbul – 18 March 2005, Istanbul) was a Turkish numismatist specializing in Islamic coins. His posthumous book Ilkhans is the definitive work on the coinage of the Ilkhanate.

Ömer Diler was trained as a chemical engineer but became interested in numismatics in 1972 when he received a rare gold coin of the Ottoman Empire as a gift. He wrote a number of articles for the Turkish Numismatic Society (Türk Numismatik Derneği) and was also a contributing editor of the American Numismatic Society.

In 1981, Diler published a book with Garo Kürkman on the coinage of the Anatolian beylik of 'Alâiye. His 2001 work Şehir Lakapları (Titles and Epithets of Islamic Towns) represents a major contribution to the knowledge of the orthography and locations of Islamic mint towns. This work has become the standard reference on the subject.

In 1993 at the suggestion of Cüneyt Ölçer, Diler began work on what would become a comprehensive book on the coinage of the Ilkhanate. With more than 250 confirmed mints and a geographical distribution including Iran and large parts of Anatolia, the Caucasus, Mesopotamia, and Central Asia, the project consumed the last twelve years of Diler's life. When he died of lung cancer in 2005, the book remained unfinished. Final editing fell to his wife, Emine Nur, Garö Kürkman, and the Bremen-based numismatist, Johann-Christoph Hinrichs. Ilkhans: coinage of the Persian Mongols appeared in both Turkish and English versions in 2006. It includes 838 drawings and twelve plates of high-quality photographs.

== Books ==
- Garo Kürkman and Ömer Diler, Alâiye paraları (Coinage of 'Alâiye), Yenilik Basımevi, Istanbul 1981
- Omer Diler, Şehir Lakapları (Titles and Epithets of Islamic Towns), Istanbul 2001.
- Ömer Diler, Ilkhans: Coinage of the Persian Mongols, Istanbul 2006.
