= Gordon Sherritt =

Canadian ice hockey player

- Born: April 8, 1919; Oakville, Manitoba, Canada
- Died: March 12, 2005 (aged 85); Monticello, Minnesota, U.S.
- Height: 6 ft 1 in (185 cm)
- Weight: 195 lb (88 kg; 13 st 13 lb)
- Position: Defence
- Shot: Left
- Played for: Detroit Red Wings; Harringay Racers
- Playing career: 1939–1949

Gordon Ephraim Sherritt (April 8, 1919 – March 12, 2005) was a Canadian professional ice hockey player who played eight games in the National Hockey League for the Detroit Red Wings during the 1943–44 season. The rest of his career, which lasted from 1939 to 1949, was mainly spent in the minor leagues. He was born in Oakville, Manitoba.

== Career statistics ==
=== Regular season and playoffs ===
			Regular season					Playoffs
Season	Team	League	GP	G	A	Pts	PIM	GP	G	A	Pts	PIM
1937–38	Portage Terriers	MJHL	10	1	0	1	12	—	—	—	—	—
1938–39	Portage Terriers	MJHL	16	1	0	1	16	2	0	0	0	0
1939–40	Harringay Racers	ENL	—	6	2	8	—	—	—	—	—	—
1940–41	Edmonton Flyers	ASHL	21	0	0	0	29	—	—	—	—	—
1941–42	Moose Jaw Millers	SSHL	32	0	8	8	46	9	0	2	2	18
1942–43	Indianapolis Capitals	AHL	53	2	13	15	63	7	0	1	1	8
1942–43	New Haven Eagles	AHL	4	0	5	5	4	—	—	—	—	—
1943–44	Detroit Red Wings	NHL	8	0	0	0	12	—	—	—	—	—
1943–44	Indianapolis Capitals	AHL	43	2	12	14	165	5	1	2	3	18
1944–45	Indianapolis Capitals	AHL	51	3	11	14	86	5	0	1	1	2
1945–46	Cleveland Barons	AHL	18	0	9	9	50	—	—	—	—	—
1945–46	Minneapolis Millers	USHL	18	1	5	6	24	—	—	—	—	—
1946–47	Minneapolis Millers	USHL	48	2	13	15	96	3	0	0	0	0
1947–48	Minneapolis Millers	USHL	61	1	12	13	76	10	1	3	4	10
1948–49	Minneapolis Millers	USHL	64	3	35	38	63	—	—	—	—	—
AHL totals			169	7	50	57	368	17	1	4	5	28
USHL totals			191	7	65	72	259	13	1	3	4	10
NHL totals			8	0	0	0	12	—	—	—	—	—
