= Carlos Sherman =

Uruguayan-born Belarusian-Spanish writer and human rights activist

Sherman Carlos

Carlos Sherman (Belarusian: Карлас Шэрман; October 25, 1934 – March 4, 2005) was a Uruguay-born Belarusian–Spanish translator, writer, human rights activist and honorary vice-president of the Belarusian PEN Center (a worldwide association of writers, aimed to promote intellectual cooperation and understanding among writers). He translated from Spanish into Belarusian and Russian.

== Biography ==
Carlos was born in Montevideo, Uruguay. His father was from western Belarus, and his mother was Indigenous. He grew up in Argentina, and studied philology at Universidad de Morón in Buenos Aires from 1951 to 1956, and started his writing career there. He became a friend of Pablo Neruda. In 1955, he became editor in chief of the newspaper 'Mi Pueblo'. In 1956, influenced by Soviet propaganda, his father decided to return to Belarus (then the Belarusian Soviet Socialist Republic, part of the USSR), taking the whole family. At first, Carlos worked there in a factory, and then as a translator and librarian (chief of the publishing operations of the Jakub Kolas library of the Academy of Sciences of Belarus), and from 1980 onwards, devoting himself exclusively to literary work. He has translated into Spanish the work of several leading Belarusian prose writers and poets (such as Jakub Kolas, Janka Kupala, Ryhor Baradulin, Vasil Bykau) and into Belarusian and Russian the works of García Lorca, Neruda, and many others, while continuing to write his own poetry in Spanish. In the late 1980s, he launched a campaign to establish a Belarusian Centre of the International PEN organization, and, once it was established, served as its vice-president until 2002 or 2003, when he was forced to retire due to ill health.

He died in a hospital in Norway at the age of 71.
