= Toni Schumacher =

German footballer (born 1954)

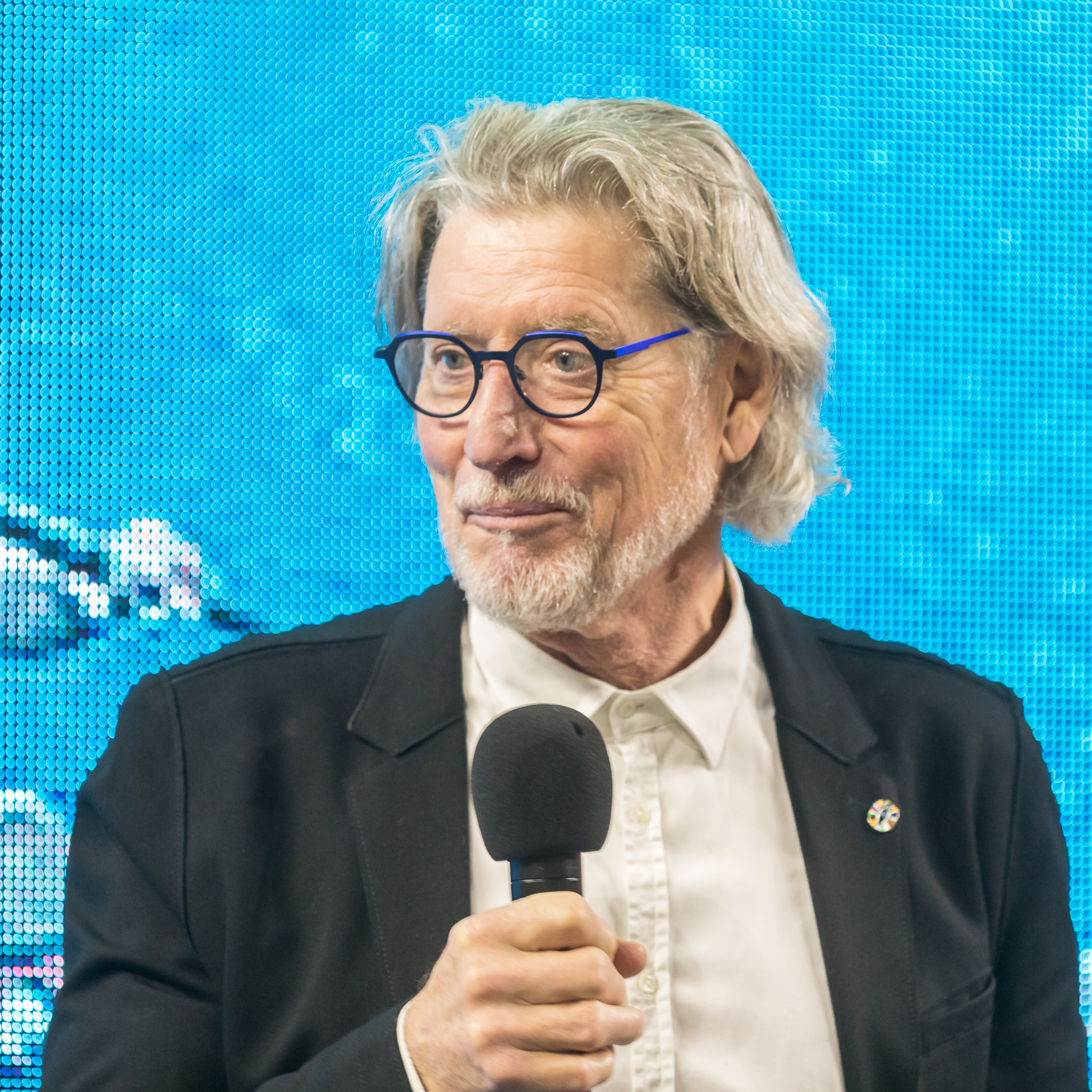
- Schumacher in 2023

Personal information
- Full name: Harald Anton Schumacher
- Date of birth: 6 March 1954 (age 72)
- Place of birth: Düren, West Germany
- Height: 1.86 m (6 ft 1 in)
- Position: Goalkeeper

Youth career
- 1962–1972: Schwarz-Weiß Düren

Senior career*
Years	Team	Apps	(Gls)
1972–1987	1. FC Köln	422	(0)
1987–1988	Schalke 04	33	(0)
1988–1991	Fenerbahçe	84	(0)
1991–1992	Bayern Munich	8	(0)
1995–1996	Borussia Dortmund	1	(0)
Total		548	(0)

International career
1979–1986	West Germany	76	(0)

Managerial career
- 1998–1999: SC Fortuna Köln
Medal record
Men's football
Representing Germany
UEFA European Championship
Winner	1980 Italy
FIFA World Cup
Runner-up	1982 Spain
Runner-up	1986 Mexico
- * Club domestic league appearances and goals

Harald Anton "Toni" Schumacher (born 6 March 1954) is a German former professional footballer who played as a goalkeeper. At club level, he won a Bundesliga title and three DFB-Pokal titles with 1. FC Köln. At international level, he represented West Germany. Schumacher won the 1980 European Championship and reached two World Cup finals, in 1982 and 1986, being on the losing side for both. In the 1982 FIFA World Cup semi-final, he controversially collided with and seriously injured French defender Patrick Battiston. Schumacher was voted German Footballer of the Year in 1984 and 1986. Since April 2012, he has served as vice president at 1. FC Köln.

== Club career ==
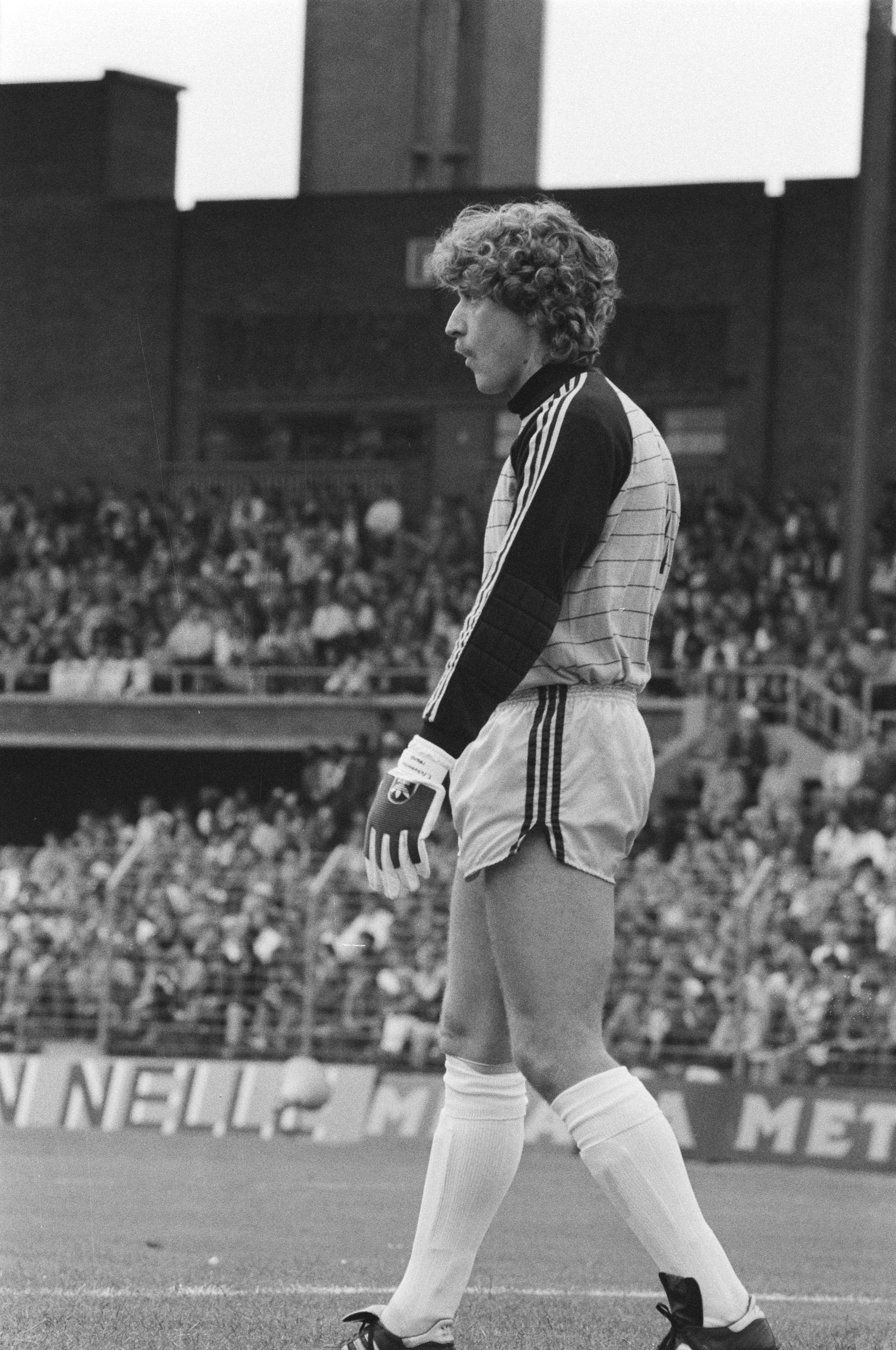
Schumacher with 1. FC Köln in 1982 Toni Schumacher's signature

Schumacher made his first-team debut with 1. FC Köln at the age of 19. He played for the club from 1972 to 1987, including in 213 consecutive Bundesliga matches from 1977 to 1983. For most of those years, until well into the mid-1980s, he was widely considered one of the world's top goalkeepers, and he was the automatic first-choice goalkeeper for his country. He backstopped Köln to the double in 1978, winning the Bundesliga title (ahead of Borussia Mönchengladbach on goal difference) and the DFB-Pokal (defeated Fortuna Düsseldorf). The year before he had led Köln to a DFB-Pokal victory (against Hertha BSC in the final), the club's first major trophy win in nine years. He appeared in two other DFB-Pokal finals, in 1980 (lost to Fortuna Düsseldorf) and 1983 (defeated Fortuna Köln). Schumacher was voted German Footballer of the Year twice, in 1984 and 1986, by the nation's football journalists.

== International career ==
Schumacher played 76 international matches for West Germany between 1979 and 1986, including 15 World Cup qualifying matches and 14 World Cup matches. He won the 1980 European Championship (defeated Belgium 2–1 in the final) and reached two World Cup finals, losing both – in 1982 (to Italy, 3–1) and 1986 (to Argentina, 3–2). In the 1982 tournament, in the controversial semi-final against France, he saved two penalties in the first penalty shootout of the World Cup Finals, which West Germany ultimately won. In the 1986 quarter-final against tournament hosts, Mexico, he saved two of the three shootout penalties he faced, enabling West Germany to advance again. He also won the silver ball in the latter’s World Cup.

=== Controversy at 1982 World Cup ===
Schumacher during the 1986 World Cup final

Schumacher was involved in a collision with a French defender, substitute Patrick Battiston, in the semi-final of the 1982 World Cup. Battiston and Schumacher were both sprinting towards a long through ball pass from Michel Platini. Battiston managed to reach the ball first and flicked it up and to the side of the approaching Schumacher. Schumacher leapt into the air as the ball sailed past him, ultimately wide of the goal. Schumacher, still in the air, collided with Battiston. The resulting contact left Battiston unconscious, later slipping into a coma. Schumacher has always denied any foul intention regarding the incident, saying that he was simply going for the ball, as a goalkeeper is entitled to do. Others have alleged that he intentionally collided with Battiston. Battiston also lost two teeth and had three cracked ribs. He received oxygen on the pitch. Michel Platini later said that he thought Battiston had died, because "he had no pulse and looked pale". The Dutch referee Charles Corver did not award a penalty for the incident. Schumacher proceeded to take the goal kick and play resumed. West Germany would eventually go on to win the game on penalty kicks after the match was tied at 3–3.

Schumacher caused more controversy after the game with his response to news that Battiston had lost two teeth: "If that's all that's wrong, tell him I'll pay for the crowns."

Schumacher did visit Battiston in the hospital, and when West Germany and France met again in the World Cup 1986, Battiston said that the incident was "forgiven and forgotten". However, he said that he was wary of getting "close to Schumacher" and said that he would hold a distance of at least 40 meters from the West German goalkeeper. Schumacher would mostly refrain from commenting on the incident. Germany won the match 2–0.

A French newspaper poll asked which was the least popular man in France. Schumacher came first, beating Adolf Hitler into second place.

== Coaching career ==
As coach of SC Fortuna Köln he was sacked at half time by club chairman Jean Löring when his club was 0–2 behind against Waldhof Mannheim in December 1999.

== Vice president 1. FC Köln ==
Schumacher was elected on 23 April 2012 vice president of 1. FC Köln together with Werner Spinner as president. During his tenure within the presidium, he was primarily responsible for the sporting area. His term of office ended at the beginning of September 2019.

== Autobiography ==
In 1987, Schumacher's autobiography Anpfiff ("kick-off") was published in various countries, including France, where there was interest in Schumacher's comments on the Battiston incident. Schumacher maintained that his actions did not constitute a foul and that he was only trying to get the ball. He said that he did not go over to check on Battiston's condition because several French players were standing around Battiston and making threatening gestures in his direction.

The book also included accounts of alleged improprieties by German football players, including substance abuse. This resulted in Schumacher's exclusion from the Germany national team and his long-term Bundesliga club, 1. FC Köln.

== Career statistics ==
Ref.

Club	Season	League			Cup (Note: Includes DFB-Pokal and Turkish Cup)		Europe		Total	
Club	Season	League	Apps	Goals	Apps	Goals	Apps	Goals	Apps	Goals
1. FC Köln	1972–73	Bundesliga	0	0	1	0	0	0	1	0
1. FC Köln	1973–74	Bundesliga	13	0	0	0	2 (Note: Appearances in UEFA Cup)	0	15	0
1. FC Köln	1974–75	Bundesliga	34	0	4	0	9	0	47	0
1. FC Köln	1975–76	Bundesliga	26	0	3	0	0	0	29	0
1. FC Köln	1976–77	Bundesliga	27	0	6	0	6	0	39	0
1. FC Köln	1977–78	Bundesliga	34	0	6	0	2 (Note: Appearances in Cup Winner's Cup)	0	42	0
1. FC Köln	1978–79	Bundesliga	34	0	4	0	8 (Note: Appearances in European Cup)	0	46	0
1. FC Köln	1979–80	Bundesliga	34	0	8	0	—		42	0
1. FC Köln	1980–81	Bundesliga	34	0	3	0	10	0	47	0
1. FC Köln	1981–82	Bundesliga	34	0	1	0	—		35	0
1. FC Köln	1982–83	Bundesliga	34	0	6	0	6	0	46	0
1. FC Köln	1983–84	Bundesliga	33	0	3	0	4	0	40	0
1. FC Köln	1984–85	Bundesliga	34	0	2	0	8	0	44	0
1. FC Köln	1985–86	Bundesliga	33	0	2	0	12	0	47	0
1. FC Köln	1986–87	Bundesliga	18	0	3	0	—		21	0
1. FC Köln	Total		422	0	52	0	67	0	541	0
Schalke 04	1987–88	Bundesliga	33	0	1	0	—		34	0
Fenerbahçe	1988–89	1. Lig	35	0	9	0	—		44	0
Fenerbahçe	1989–90	1. Lig	21	0	3 (Note: Including one appearance in Turkish Super Cup)	0	2	0	26	0
Fenerbahçe	1990–91	1. Lig	28	0	3	0	4	0	35	0
Fenerbahçe	Total		84	0	15	0	6	0	105	0
Bayern Munich	1991–92	Bundesliga	8	0	0	0	0	0	8	0
Borussia Dortmund	1995–96	Bundesliga	1	0	0	0	0	0	1	0
Career total			548	0	68	0	73	0	689	0

== Honours ==
1. FC Köln

- Bundesliga: 1977–78
- DFB-Pokal: 1976–77, 1977–78, 1982–83
- UEFA Cup runner-up: 1985–86

Borussia Dortmund

- Bundesliga: 1995–96

Fenerbahçe

- 1.Lig: 1988–89

Germany

- UEFA European Championship: 1980
- FIFA World Cup runner-up: 1982, 1986

Individual

- German Footballer of the Year: 1984, 1986
- UEFA European Championship Team of the Tournament: 1984
- Guerin Sportivo All-Star Team: 1984
- FIFA World Cup Silver Ball: 1986
- Turkish Footballer of the Year: 1988, 1989
