= Kiyotaka Hayakawa =

Japanese handball player (1946–2005)

Kiyotaka Hayakawa (17 July 1946 – 29 March 2005) was a Japanese handball player who competed in the 1972 Summer Olympics.
