= Tom Michel =

American football halfback (1940–2005)

No. 21
- Position: Halfback

Personal information
- Born: December 7, 1940; Berkeley, California, U.S.
- Died: March 21, 2005 (aged 64); Greenville, North Carolina, U.S.

Career information
- High school: Wakefield
- College: East Carolina (1960–1963)

Career history
- Minnesota Vikings (1964); Washington Redskins (1966)*
- * Offseason or practice squad member only
- Stats at Pro Football Reference

Thomas William Michel (December 7, 1940 – March 21, 2005) was an American professional football halfback. He played for the Minnesota Vikings of the National Football League (NFL).

== Life and career ==
Michel was born in Berkeley, California, and was raised in Arlington, Virginia. He played high school football as a wingback at Wakefield High School. He then enrolled at East Carolina University to play college football for the East Carolina Pirates. He was on the freshman team in 1960, and was a three-year varsity letterman from 1961 to 1963.

In December 1963, Michel was selected by the Minnesota Vikings of the National Football League (NFL) in the 14th round of the 1964 NFL draft, and he joined the team in January 1964. He played in eleven games during the 1964 NFL season, and he was released from the team in August 1965. In March 1966, he joined the Washington Redskins, and he was placed on the injured reserve list in July 1966. He was released from the team in August 1967.

== Death ==
Michel died on March 21, 2005, in Greenville, North Carolina, at the age of 64.
