= Encarnación Cabré =

Spanish archaeologist and professor

- 1931 passport photograph
- Born: Encarnación Cabré Herreros; March 21, 1911; Madrid, Spain
- Died: March 18, 2005 (aged 93); Madrid, Spain
- Education: Complutense University of Madrid

Encarnación Cabré Herreros (21 March 1911 – 18 March 2005) was a Spanish archaeologist. A prolific academic in the 1930s, Cabré is considered to be the first woman in Spain to become a professional archaeologist.

Cabré developed an interest in archaeology at a young age. She accompanied her father Juan Cabré, a prominent Spanish archaeologist, on expeditions to peninsular Spain. She was a prolific academic in the 1930s, presenting her research in archaeological excavation in various journals and international conferences. After the Spanish Civil War of the late 1930s, the Francoist dictatorship forbade her from teaching, and she mostly retired. She returned to the field in 1975, where she remained active for the rest of her life.

In 2019, the Spanish parliament recognised Cabré for contributions to women's professional advancement.

== Life and career ==
=== Early life ===
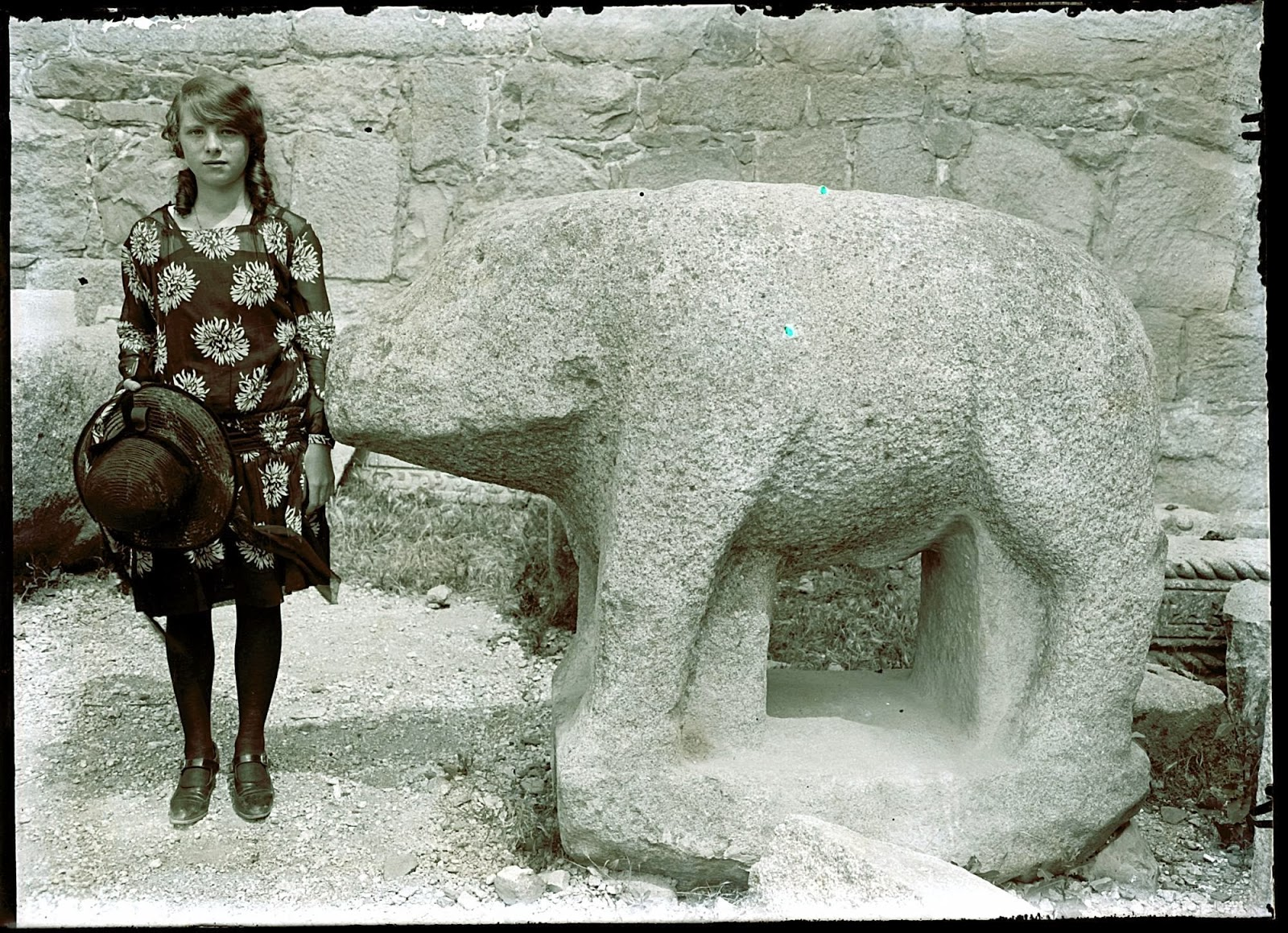
Cabré in 1926

Encarnación Cabré Herreros was born on 21 March 1911 in Madrid, Spain, to a middle-class family with "deep Catholic roots" ("de profundas raíces católicas"). Her father, Juan Cabré, was a prominent Spanish archaeologist. She lived the first six years of her life in her maternal grandparents' home in Santa María de Huerta, as her father could not own a house due to the intense nature of his work.

In 1917, her family moved to Madrid, so that her father could conduct his research on Iberian culture at the Centro de Estudios Históricos (lit. 'Center for Historical Studies'). In Madrid, she was enrolled into the Colegio de Monjas del Sagrado Corazón for her primary education. She entered the Instituto Cardenal Cisneros in 1921, where she studied for her baccalaureate until 1928. Later in 1921, she had her first experience with archaeological excavations when she visited Cantabria, where her father was inspecting archaeological sites.

=== Academic career ===
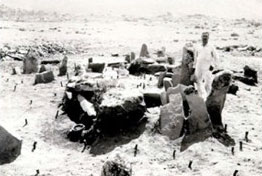
The necropolis at Las Cogotas, photographed by Cabré in 1930

Cabré began to work as her father's main collaborator with much of his fieldwork in 1927, when she was seventeen years old. She accompanied him on excavations in peninsular Spain through her university education and until the Spanish Civil War, and later acted as a co-author on the report of their results. She attended the Complutense University of Madrid from 1928 to 1932, where she obtained a degree in history. From 1929 to 1956, she published a book and over twenty articles. In September 1929, she attended the IV International Congress of Classical Archaeology in Barcelona, where she presented the only study conducted by a Spanish woman. She also attended the XV International Congress of Prehistoric Archaeology and Anthropology in Portugal in 1930. The same year, her portrait was included in publications by the Portuguese and French press which discussed the modernity of Spanish women.

Cabré taught as a professor at the University of Madrid and the Instituto-Escuela in Germany and Morocco. Around this time in 1933, she participated in a Mediterranean cruise organised by the University of Madrid for university students and faculty. However, the Francoist dictatorship forbade her from continuing her tenure at the University of Madrid. Cabré also became the only woman to have begun work on a doctoral thesis in the first three decades of the 20th century, which she began after she received a scholarship from the Junta para Ampliación de Estudios (an institution that managed the Center for Historical Studies). She used the scholarship to attend prehistory and ethnography courses at universities in Berlin and Hamburg in 1934 and 1935. There, she studied under German academics Leo Frobenius, Albert Kiekebusch, and Walter Matthes. From 1934 to 1936, she spent time in France, Germany, Austria, Czechoslovakia, Italy, and Switzerland as a part of a pedagogical initiative launched by Spanish government.

From 1937 to 1939, Cabré completed her doctoral studies while she worked under the archaeologist Manuel Gómez-Moreno Martínez at the Center for Historical Studies. Her thesis focused on Iron Age weaponry in the Iberian Peninsula. She was forced to retire from the field of archaeology in 1939 due to family obligations, after marrying Francisco Morán. She then only intermittently published works, primarily in collaboration with her father. After her father died in 1947, she returned to the field, mainly to publish his work in various academic journals and conference proceedings from 1949 to 1959.

=== Later life ===
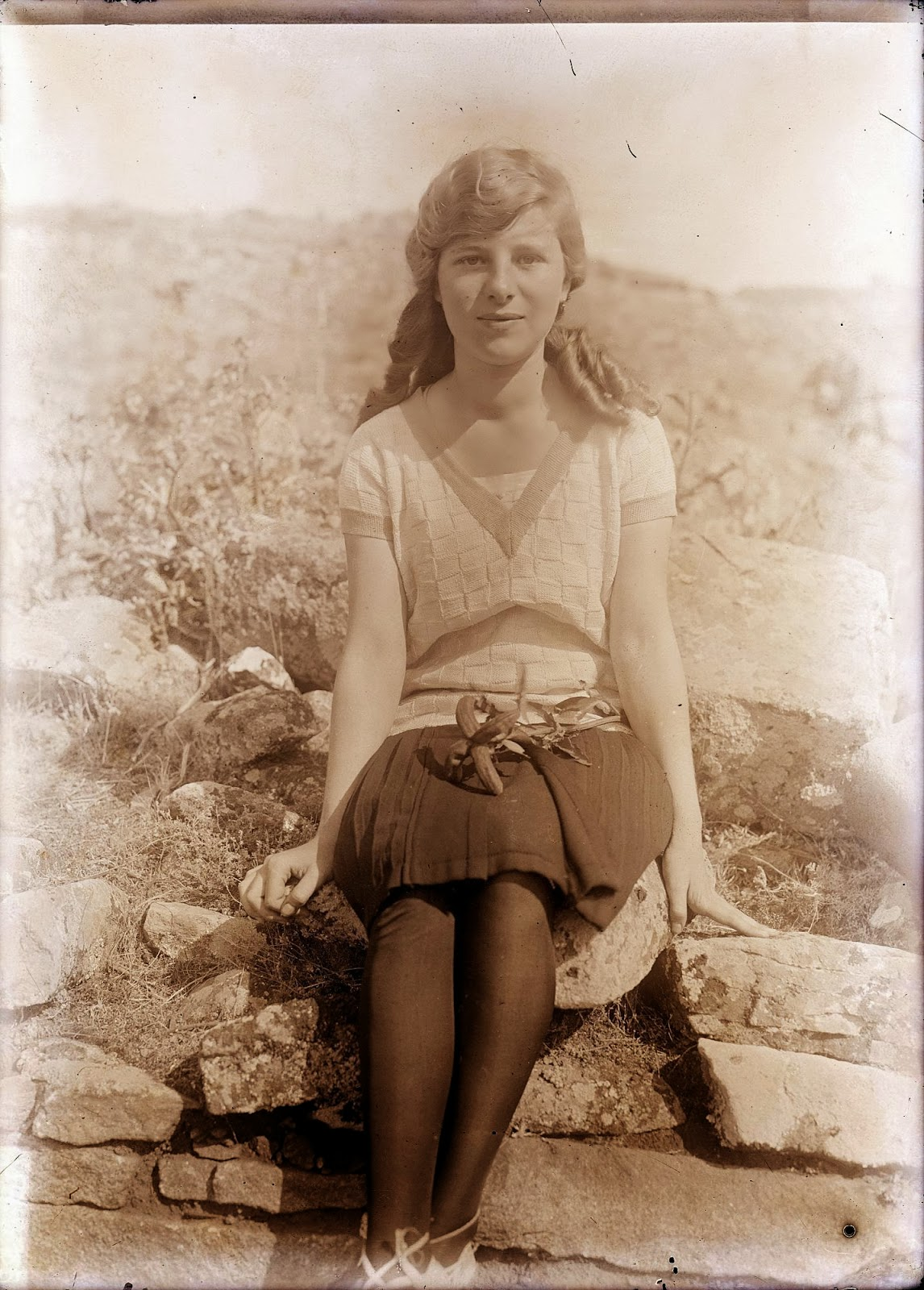
Encarnación Cabré photographed by her father Juan Cabré (ca.1930).

Cabré began to publish again in 1975, mainly in collaboration with her son Juan Morán Cabré, and continued doing so until the end of her life. She died on 18 March 2005 in Madrid. Upon her death, she had her father's and her own archives donated to the Autonomous University of Madrid.

== Legacy ==
According to archaeologist María Luisa Oliveros Rives, in the first three decades of the 20th century, women were incompletely incorporated into the profession of archaeology. Women scarcely took part in excavations, where they were often viewed as "a disruptive and undesirable element". Margarita Díaz-Andreu, an archaeologist at the University of Barcelona, has defined Cabré as an exception to this predominant view, since Cabré was exposed to the field of archaeology through her father and collaborated with him on much of his fieldwork.

In 2018, the political group Unidos Podemos registered a proposal to the Government of Spain and the Directorate-General for Fine Arts to rename a garden at Madrid's National Archaeological Museum after Cabré. The garden would be renamed the "Jardín de Encarnación Cabré" in recognition of her role in the "group of young women who opened the university to many others and demonstrated that women can successfully enter traditionally masculine disciplines" ("ese grupo de mujeres jóvenes que abrieron la universidad a muchas otras y que demostraron que las mujeres pueden adentrarse con éxito en disciplinas tradicionalmente masculinizadas"). On 27 February 2019, the Committee of Culture in the Congress of Deputies unanimously approved the proposal. elDiario.es reported in 2024 that the garden had still not been named after Cabré, but had only mentioned her on a plaque with a list of women and a QR code directing readers to the biographies of more than 100 pioneering women in archaeology. Her family was critical of the museum, as they felt it honored the achievements of a collective of unnamed women rather than those of specific individuals.
