= Hans-Werner Seher =

German water polo player

Personal information
- Nationality: German
- Born: 28 April 1929; Düsseldorf, Germany
- Died: 5 March 2005 (aged 75); Hudson, Florida, United States

Sport
- Sport: Water polo

Hans-Werner Seher (28 April 1929 – 5 March 2005) was a German water polo player. He competed in the men's tournament at the 1956 Summer Olympics.
