= 2010 in Chilean football =

Football in Chile
- Season: 2010

This article covers the 2010 football season in Chile.

== National tournaments ==
=== Primera División ===
Due to the 2010 Chile earthquake, there was a single tournament, rather than the usual consecutive Apertura and Clausura "seasons"

- Champion: Universidad Católica (10th title)
  - Topscorer: Milovan Mirosevic (19 goals)
- Relegated: Everton, San Luis Quillota

Source: RSSSF

=== Copa Chile ===
- Winner: Municipal Iquique (2nd title)

Source: RSSSF

== National team results ==
Win Draw Loss

=== 2010 World Cup ===
June 16 Group stage	Honduras	0 – 1	Chile	Nelspruit, South Africa
13:30 UTC+2		(Report)	Beausejour 34'	Stadium: Mbombela Stadium; Attendance: 32,664; Referee: Eddy Maillet (Seychelles)

June 21 Group stage	Chile	1 – 0	Switzerland	Port Elizabeth, South Africa
16:00 UTC+2	González 75'	(Report)		Stadium: Nelson Mandela Bay Stadium; Attendance: 34,872; Referee: Khalil Al Ghamdi (Saudi Arabia)

June 25 Group stage	Chile	1 – 2	Spain	Pretoria, South Africa
20:30 UTC+2	Millar 47'	(Report)	24' Villa; 37' Iniesta	Stadium: Loftus Versfeld Stadium; Attendance: 41,958; Referee: Marco Rodríguez (Mexico)

June 28 Round of 16	Brazil	3 – 0	Chile	Johannesburg, South Africa
20:30 UTC+2	Juan 35'; Luís Fabiano 38'; Robinho 59'	(Report)		Stadium: Ellis Park Stadium; Attendance: 54,096; Referee: Howard Webb (England)

=== Friendly matches ===
January 20	Chile	2 – 1	Panama	Coquimbo, Chile
22:30 UTC-3	Paredes 52', 54'	(Report)	Brown 87'	Stadium: Bicentenario Francisco Sánchez Rumoroso; Attendance: 18,750; Referee: Martín Vázquez (Uruguay)

March 31	Chile	0 – 0	Venezuela	Temuco, Chile
22:15 UTC-3		(Report)		Stadium: Bicentenario Germán Becker; Attendance: 18,125; Referee: Roberto Silvera (Uruguay)

May 5	Chile	2 – 0	Trinidad and Tobago	Iquique, Chile
22:15 UTC-4	Morales 1'; Toro 48'	(Report)		Stadium: Tierra de Campeones; Attendance: 10,000; Referee: Jorge Antequera (Bolivia)

May 16	Mexico	1 – 0	Chile	Mexico City, Mexico
12:00 UTC-5	Medina 13'	(Report)		Stadium: Estadio Azteca; Attendance: 95,000; Referee: Mark Geiger (United States)

May 26	Chile	3 – 0	Zambia	Calama, Chile
19:15 UTC-4	Alexis 52' 83'; Valdivia 85'	(Report)		Stadium: Municipal de Calama; Attendance: 12,000; Referee: Gabriel Favale (Argentina)

May 30	Chile	1 – 0	Northern Ireland	Chillán, Chile
15:15 UTC-4	Paredes 31'	(Report)		Stadium: Nelson Oyarzún Arenas; Attendance: 12,000; Referee: Líber Prudente (Uruguay)

May 30	Chile	3 – 0	Israel	Concepción, Chile
22:00 UTC-4	Suazo 19'; Alexis 49'; Tello 91'	(Report)		Stadium: Municipal de Collao; Attendance: 25,000; Referee: Antonio Arias (Paraguay)

June 9 Unofficial Friendly	Chile	2 – 0	New Zealand	Nelspruit, South Africa
13:30 UTC+2	Fierro 68'; Paredes 71'	(Report)		Stadium: Kanyamazane Stadium; Attendance: 6,000; Referee: Danieel Bennard (South Africa)

September 7	Ukraine	2 – 1	Chile	Kyiv, Ukraine
21:00 UTC+02	Rakytskiy 36'; Aliyev 65'	(Report)	Isla 87'	Stadium: Lobanovsky Dynamo Stadium; Attendance: 6,000; Referee: Vital Sebastianic (Belarus)

October 9	United Arab Emirates	0 – 2	Chile	Abu Dhabi, United Arab Emirates
20:30 UTC+4		(Report)	Cereceda 6' (pen.); Morales 37'	Stadium: Sheikh Zayed Stadium; Attendance: 500; Referee: Jalal Al Ghamdi (Saudi Arabia)

October 12	Oman	0 – 1	Chile	As Sib, Oman
19:00 UTC+4		(Report)	Morales 20'	Stadium: Seeb Stadium; Attendance: 8,000; Referee: Abdulah Alblushi (Kuwait)

November 17	Chile	2 – 0	Uruguay	Santiago, Chile
20:45 UTC-3	Alexis 38'; Vidal 75'	(Report)		Stadium: Estadio Monumental; Attendance: 45,017; Referee: Carlos Torres (Paraguay)
