= 2010 FIFA World Cup final =

World Cup final, held in South Africa

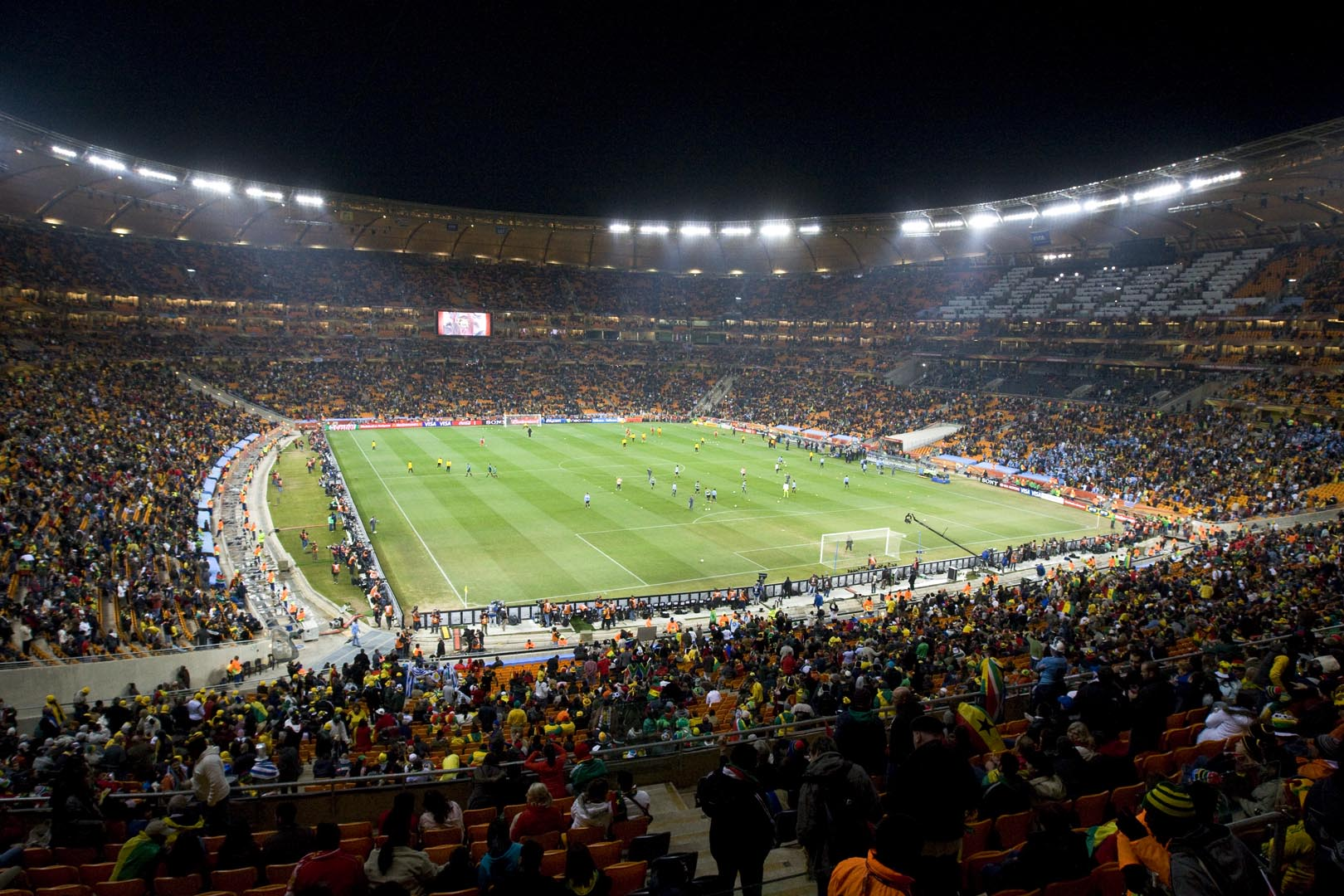
- The final was played at Johannesburg's Soccer City
- Event: 2010 FIFA World Cup
Netherlands	Spain
0	1
- After extra time
- Date: 11 July 2010
- Venue: Soccer City, Johannesburg
- Man of the Match: Andrés Iniesta (Spain)
- Referee: Howard Webb (England)
- Attendance: 84,490
- Weather: Partly cloudy night 14 °C (57 °F); 34% humidity

The final match of the 2010 FIFA World Cup, the 19th edition of FIFA's competition for national football teams, was played at Soccer City in Johannesburg, South Africa, on 11 July 2010. It was contested by the Netherlands and Spain, the first and only time two European teams contested a World Cup final held outside of Europe, as all other finals held outside of Europe featured a South American side.

The tournament comprised hosts South Africa and 31 other teams who emerged from the qualification phase, organised by the six FIFA confederations. The 32 teams competed in a group stage, from which 16 teams qualified for the knockout stage. En route to the final, the Netherlands finished first in Group E, with three wins, after which they defeated Slovakia in the round of 16, Brazil in the quarter-final and Uruguay in the semi-final. Spain finished top of Group H with two wins and one loss, before defeating Portugal in the round of 16, Paraguay in the quarter-final and Germany in the semi-final. The final took place in front of 84,490 supporters, with more than 909 million watching on television, and was refereed by Howard Webb from England.

Sergio Ramos had a chance to score for Spain early in the first half when his shot was saved by Netherlands goalkeeper Maarten Stekelenburg, while Arjen Robben had a chance for the Netherlands when he hit a low shot from the edge of the penalty area shortly before half-time, which was saved by Iker Casillas. There were numerous bookings throughout the first half, which BBC Sport's Paul Fletcher wrote had "disturbed the rhythm of the match". Robben missed an opportunity in the 62nd minute when he was one-on-one with Casillas, with the goalkeeper able to intercept his attempted shot with the toe of his boot to prevent the goal. David Villa then had a chance for Spain 4 yards (4 m) from the Netherlands goal, but Stekelenburg saved his shot. Ramos missed a header in front of goal on 77 minutes, sending the ball over the crossbar. With the match goalless after 90 minutes, it went to extra time. John Heitinga received a second booking during extra time, which resulted in him being sent off, and four minutes before the end, Andrés Iniesta gave Spain the lead and the title with a powerful right-footed shot from a short pass by Fabregas, into the left corner of the goal to secure a 1–0 win.

Spain's win was their first World Cup title, as well as the first World Cup win by a European team outside Europe. Iniesta was named the man of the match, while Casillas was awarded the Golden Glove as FIFA's outstanding goalkeeper of the tournament. Spain went on to win UEFA Euro 2012 for their third successive trophy, but failed to defend the World Cup at the 2014 tournament in Brazil, becoming the second successive World Cup holders to be eliminated in the group phase after defeats against the Netherlands and Chile.

== Background ==
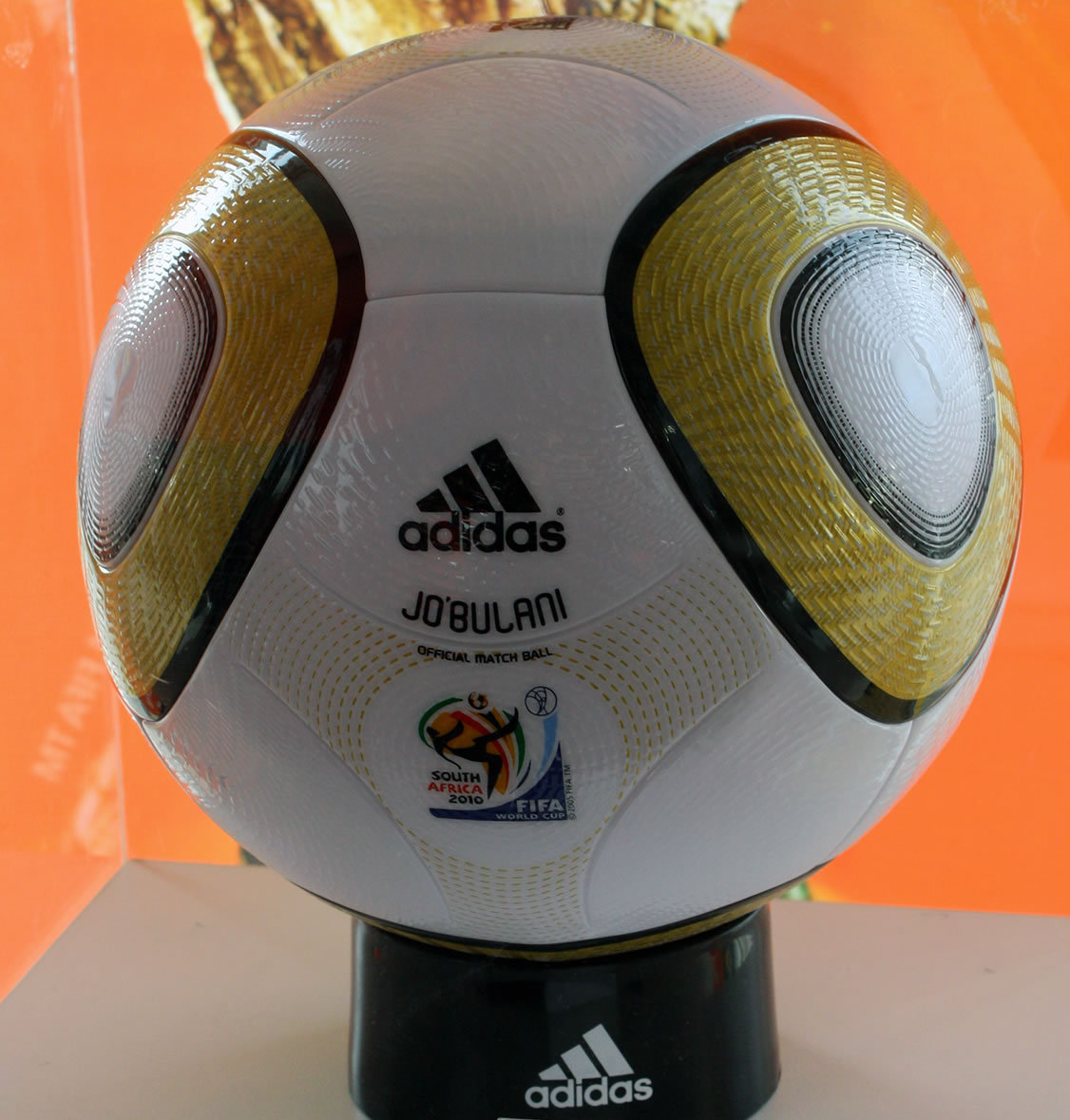
An example of the Adidas Jabulani/Jo'bulani (gold colored Jabulani) ball used in the match

The 2010 FIFA World Cup was the 19th edition of the FIFA World Cup, FIFA's football competition for national teams, held between 11 June and 11 July 2010 in South Africa. South Africa qualified for the finals automatically as tournament hosts, while 205 teams competed for the remaining 31 spots through qualifying rounds organised by the six FIFA confederations and held between August 2007 and November 2009. In the finals, the teams were divided into eight groups of four with each team playing each other once. The two top teams from each group advanced to a knock-out phase. The defending champions from the 2006 World Cup were Italy.

The match ball for the 2010 FIFA World Cup final, revealed on 20 April 2010, was the Jo'bulani, a gold version of the Adidas Jabulani ball used for every other match in the tournament. The name of the ball is a reference to "Jo'burg", a common nickname for Johannesburg, the match venue. The gold colouring of the ball mirrors the colour of the FIFA World Cup Trophy and also echoes another of Johannesburg's nicknames: "the City of Gold". The Jo'bulani became the second ball to be specifically produced for the FIFA World Cup final, after the Teamgeist Berlin was used for the 2006 final.

The 2010 final was the first time since 1978 that neither of the finalists had previously won the World Cup. The Netherlands had been runners-up twice before, losing 2–1 to West Germany in 1974, and 3–1 (after extra time) to Argentina in 1978. Reaching the 2010 final was Spain's best performance in the World Cup, their having previously finished fourth in 1950 when the tournament had a round-robin final stage, and having reached the quarter-final stage in 1934, 1986, 1994 and 2002, when single-elimination knock-out stages featured. Spain were the reigning European champions, having won UEFA Euro 2008, a tournament in which the Netherlands reached the quarter-final before being eliminated by Russia. This was the first meeting between the two teams in the main tournament stages of either a World Cup or a European Championship. In all-time head-to-head results, the teams had met nine times previously since 1920, with the Netherlands winning four games to Spain's three and one draw, all in either friendlies or European Championship qualifying games. At the start of the tournament, Spain were ranked second in the FIFA World Rankings, behind Brazil, while the Netherlands were ranked fourth.

== Route to the final ==
=== The Netherlands ===
The Netherlands' route to the final
	Opponent	Result
1	Denmark	2–0
2	Japan	1–0
3	Cameroon	2–1
R16	Slovakia	2–1
QF	Brazil	2–1
SF	Uruguay	3–2

The Netherlands entered the World Cup having won all eight matches in their qualifying campaign. They were then drawn in Group E for the World Cup, in which they were joined by Cameroon, Denmark and Japan. Their first match was against Denmark at Soccer City, on 14 June 2010. The Netherlands took the lead shortly after half-time when Denmark's Simon Poulsen cleared a cross from Robin van Persie, but it struck the back of Daniel Agger and deflected in for an own goal. Dirk Kuyt added a second five minutes before the end to complete a 2–0 win, scoring on the rebound after Thomas Sørensen, the Danish goalkeeper, had saved Eljero Elia's shot on to the goalpost. The Netherlands faced Japan in their second game, on 19 June at the Moses Mabhida Stadium in Durban. As in the first game, they scored the opening goal shortly after half-time when Wesley Sneijder received the ball on the edge of the penalty area, following an attempted clearance by Japan, and struck the ball into the goal. The win, alongside Denmark's victory over Cameroon, meant that the Netherlands had qualified for the next round before playing their final group game. That game was against Cameroon, on 24 June at Cape Town Stadium. Van Persie gave them the lead on 36 minutes, before Samuel Eto'o equalised with a penalty after Rafael van der Vaart was penalised for a handball in the penalty area. Klaas Jan Huntelaar scored a late goal, however, to seal a 2–1 win and first place in the group.

The Netherlands' round-of-16 game was against Slovakia, who had beaten Italy in their final group game, at the Moses Mabhida Stadium on 28 June. Arjen Robben started his first game of the tournament after recovering from an injury, and he gave the Netherlands the lead in the 18th minute when he received a long pass upfield by Sneijder and scored with a low shot past goalkeeper Ján Mucha. Sneijder then added a second in the 84th minute before Slovakia scored a penalty in the final minute of injury time, giving a final score of 2–1 to the Netherlands. In the quarter-final, the Netherlands faced five-times world champions Brazil, on 2 July at the Nelson Mandela Bay Stadium in Port Elizabeth. Brazil took the lead in the 10th minute, when Robinho latched on to a deep pass from Felipe Melo and scored. Goalkeeper Maarten Stekelenburg had to make several saves to prevent Brazil extending their lead. The Netherlands equalised eight minutes after half-time, the goal being initially recorded as an own goal by Melo but later credited to Sneijder. The Netherlands then took the lead from a Robben corner kick in the 68th minute, Sneijder heading the ball in after a flick-on from Kuyt. Melo was sent off for a stamp on Robben, and the Netherlands went on to complete a 2–1 win. Their semi-final was against Uruguay at Cape Town Stadium on 6 July. Giovanni van Bronckhorst gave the Netherlands the lead on 18 minutes with a shot which deflected in off the goalpost, before Diego Forlán equalised from long-range for Uruguay shortly before half-time. The Netherlands retook the lead on 70 minutes when Sneijder scored with a shot which deflected off Maxi Pereira, a Uruguayan defender. Uruguay's players protested that van Persie had been interfering with play in an offside position, but the goal stood. Robben extended their lead with a header shortly afterwards, before Pereira scored during injury time to give a final score of 3–2 to the Netherlands.

=== Spain ===
Spain's route to the final
	Opponent	Result
1	Switzerland	0–1
2	Honduras	2–0
3	Chile	2–1
R16	Portugal	1–0
QF	Paraguay	1–0
SF	Germany	1–0

Like the Netherlands, Spain also won all of the matches in their qualifying campaign. They were then drawn in Group H, alongside Chile, Honduras and Switzerland. Spain began their finals campaign on 16 June 2010 in the Moses Mabhida Stadium against Switzerland. In what The Daily Telegraph reporter Jeremy Wilson described as "among the bigger shocks in the competition's entire history", Switzerland won the game 1–0 with Gelson Fernandes scoring the winner in the second half after teammate Eren Derdiyok had collided with Spanish goalkeeper Iker Casillas when through on goal. Their second game was at Johannesburg's Ellis Park Stadium, against Honduras. David Villa opened the scoring on 17 minutes when he beat two defenders and hit a shot into the top corner of the goal. He doubled the lead shortly after half-time with a shot from the edge of the penalty area following a one-two with Xavi. Villa missed the chance for a hat-trick when his 60th-minute penalty went wide of the goalpost, and the game finished 2–0 to Spain. Spain entered their final game against Chile, at the Loftus Versfeld Stadium in Pretoria on 25 June, needing a win to guarantee their progression to the knockout stage. Villa gave Spain the lead on 24 minutes, with what The Guardian's Rob Smyth described as "the goal of the World Cup so far". Chilean goalkeeper Claudio Bravo came out of the penalty area and made a tackle on Fernando Torres, but the loose ball then reached Villa on the left of the pitch and he curled a shot into the net from a distance of around 40 yards (37 m). They doubled their lead on 37 minutes when Andrés Iniesta scored following a pass from Villa. Chile's Marco Estrada was sent off for a second yellow card when the referee judged that he had fouled Torres in the build-up to the goal. Rodrigo Millar pulled a goal back for Chile after half-time, but Spain held on for a 2–1 and a place in the next round as group winners.

Spain's round-of-16 game was against Portugal at the Cape Town Stadium, on 29 June. Both teams had chances to score in the first half, but it was Spain who took the lead on 63 minutes when Xavi found Villa with a back-heeled pass who scored into the top of the goal after his initial shot was saved by Portuguese goalkeeper Eduardo Carvalho. Portugal's Ricardo Costa was sent off with two minutes remaining, for elbowing Joan Capdevila, and Spain went on to complete a 1–0 victory. In the quarter-final, Spain faced Paraguay at Ellis Park Stadium on 3 July. Paraguay put the ball into the goal shortly before half-time but it was disallowed as Óscar Cardozo was ruled offside. Paraguay were awarded a penalty on 57 minutes, taken by Cardozo after Gerard Piqué had fouled him, but it was saved by Casillas. Two minutes later, Spain were awarded a penalty of their own when Antolín Alcaraz fouled Villa. Xabi Alonso put the ball past the goalkeeper into the net, but the referee ordered it to be retaken due to Spanish players being inside the penalty area when the penalty was taken. Alonso's second attempt, the third penalty of the match, was saved by goalkeeper Justo Villar, and the score remained 0–0. The deadlock was finally broken by Villa, who scored a goal on 82 minutes, which bounced off both posts before going in, to give Spain a 1–0 win. Their semi-final match took place on 7 July against Germany at the Moses Mabhida Stadium. For the third successive game, Spain won 1–0, the winner a headed goal by Carles Puyol. Kevin McCarra of The Guardian commented afterwards that these results did not imply that Spain were "grinding out" results, however. He said that their play was "enjoyable as well as masterful".

== Match ==
=== Pre-match ===
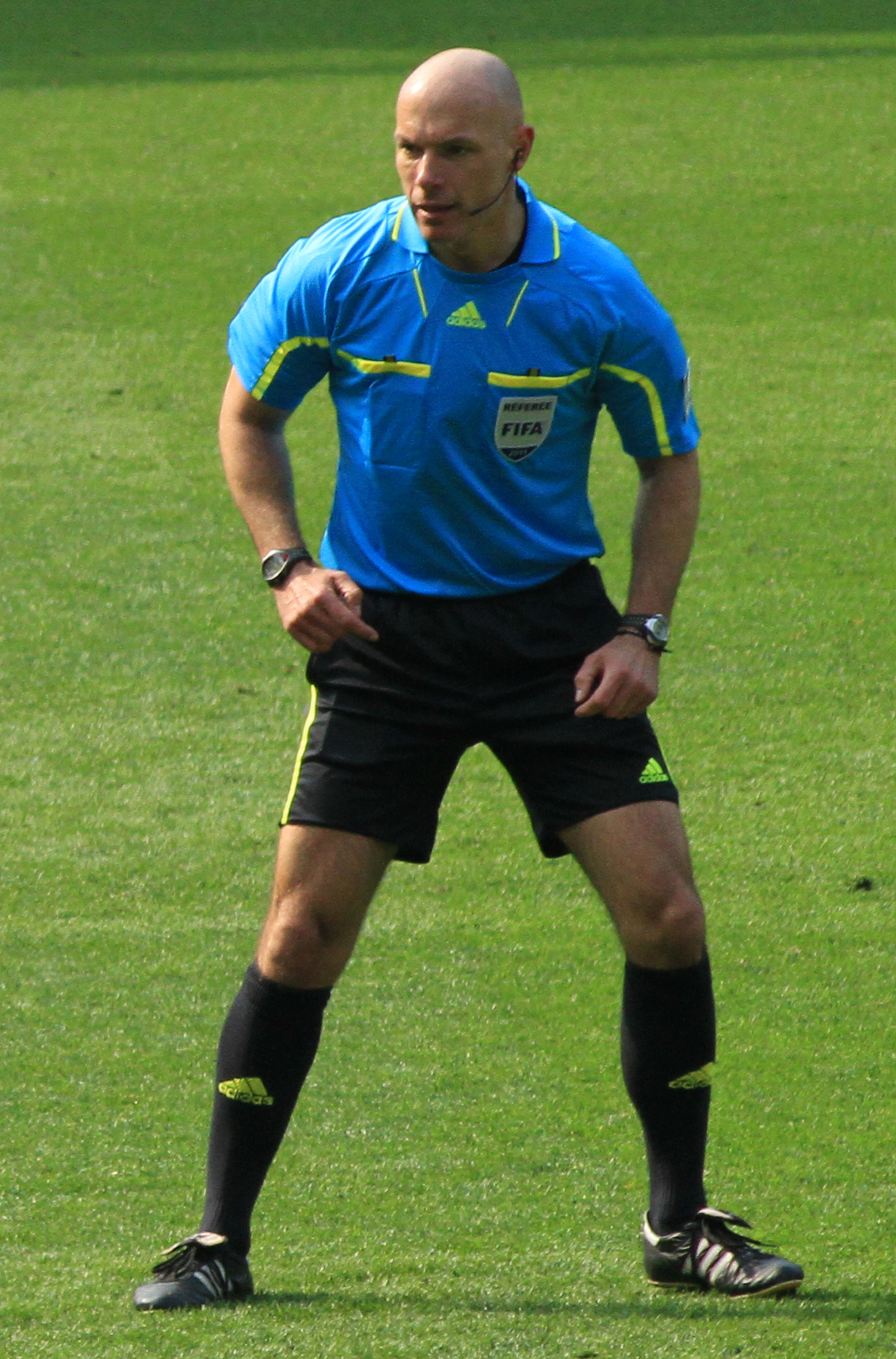
Howard Webb was the final's referee

Howard Webb of England was named as the referee for the final, along with fellow Englishmen Darren Cann and Michael Mullarkey who were the assistant referees. Webb was the first Englishman to referee a World Cup final since Jack Taylor officiated the 1974 final. A former police officer from Rotherham, Webb was one of the English Select Group of referees, and had officiated Premier League matches since 2003. He was appointed to the FIFA list of international match referees in 2005, and before the World Cup, he had taken charge of the 2010 UEFA Champions League Final and the 2009 FA Cup Final. Webb had refereed three prior games at the 2010 World Cup. Yuichi Nishimura and Toru Sagara, both from Japan, were the fourth and fifth officials respectively.

A closing ceremony for the World Cup was held on the pitch before the game, featuring dancers in the colours of the 32 tournament participants. There were also dancers dressed as elephants and hippopotamuses gathered around a watering hole, denoting South Africa's wildlife, and others in clothing typical of the country's urban youth. Video highlights from the tournament were projected on to the pitch, while local music group Ladysmith Black Mambazo performed their song "Rain Rain Beautiful Rain" and Shakira sang the World Cup anthem "Waka Waka (This Time for Africa)". Nelson Mandela, who had missed the opening ceremony due to the death of his great-granddaughter in a road accident, made an appearance on the pitch in his wheelchair before the game, alongside wife Graça Machel. He was greeted with a noisy standing ovation and a peal of vuvuzelas from the spectators at the game. Other attendees at the match included members of both the Dutch and Spanish royal families. South African dignitaries and celebrities attended, including Charlize Theron and South African president Jacob Zuma. Spaniards Plácido Domingo, Rafael Nadal and Pau Gasol were in attendance to cheer on their team. American actor Morgan Freeman, who had played Mandela in the 2009 film Invictus, was also present at the game.

=== First half ===
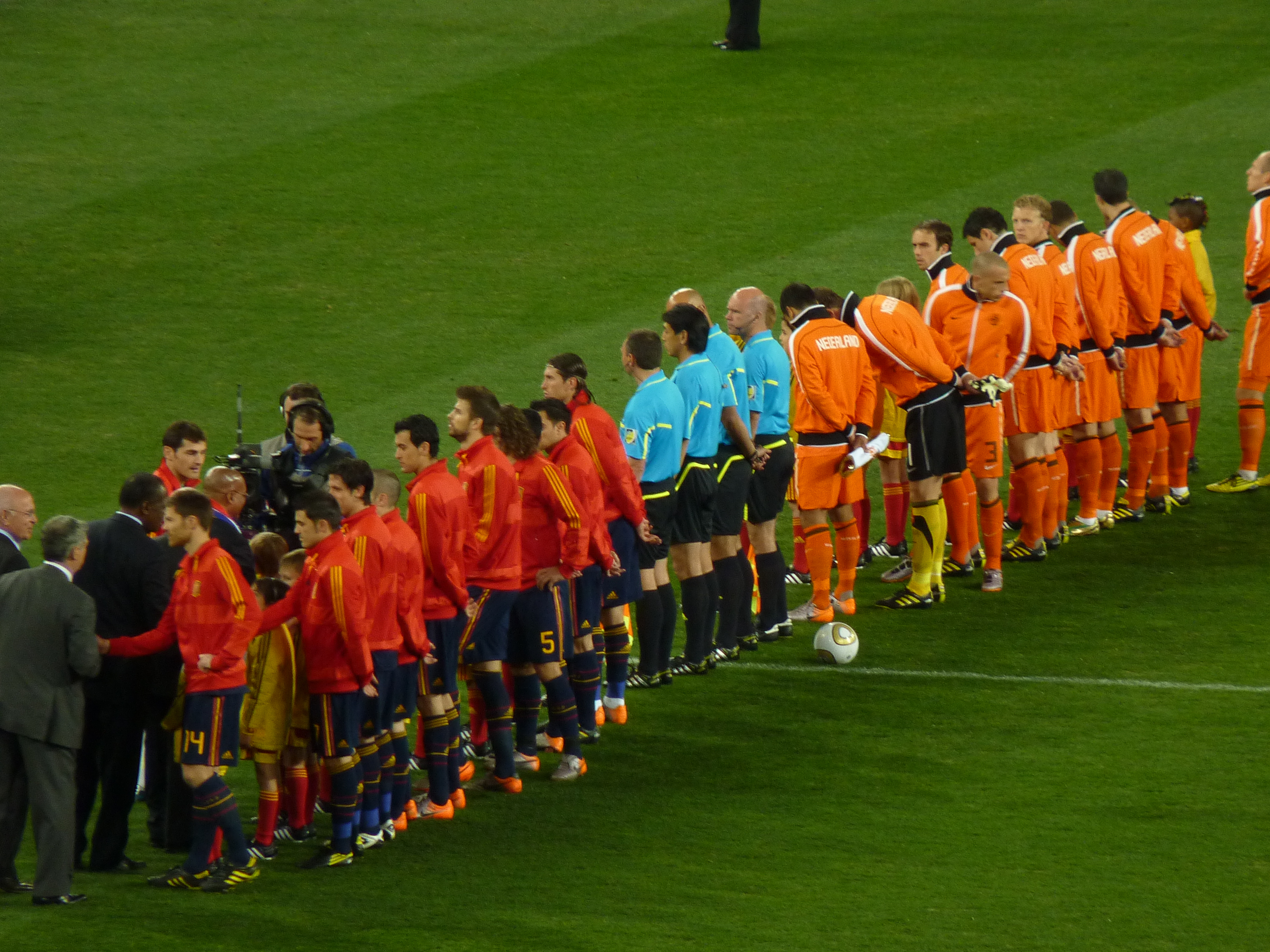
South African president Jacob Zuma and other dignitaries shaking hands with the lined-up teams before kick-off.

The Netherlands kicked off at approximately 8:30 pm local time (6:30 pm UTC) in temperatures of 14 °C (57 °F), with humidity of 34%. Spain won a free kick on 5 minutes, when van Bronckhorst fouled Alonso. Xavi's kick reached Sergio Ramos in the penalty area, who headed the ball towards the bottom-left corner of the goal, but Stekelenburg was able to dive down to make the save. Pique then gained possession of the loose ball, and attempted to pass to Villa in the centre, but Stekelenburg intercepted. Two minutes later, Kuyt obtained the ball following an error by Alonso, and took a shot at the Spanish goal from 25 yards (23 m) out but it was weak and Casillas was able to claim the ball. Spain had a chance on 11 minutes when Ramos beat Kuyt after receiving the ball from Iniesta, but John Heitinga deflected his shot over the crossbar. Alonso took the resulting corner, which was volleyed by Villa into the side netting. On 15 minutes, Van Persie received the first booking of the match for a foul on Capdevila, with Puyol also being shown the yellow card two minutes later for a high tackle on Robben. Sneijder hit a 25-yard (23 m) shot at goal from the resulting free kick which was caught by Casillas.

On 22 minutes, Mark van Bommel was booked for a foul during a sliding tackle on Iniesta, with Ramos joining him in the book two minutes later for bringing down Kuyt. Nigel de Jong then became the fifth player of the match to be booked with a high tackle on Alonso which resulted in his studs connecting with the Spaniard's chest. Busquets complained to the referee that this should have resulted in a sending off, Paul Fletcher of BBC Sport described the multiple bookings as having "disturbed the rhythm of the match", but noted that "several crude challenges left him with little option". Casillas collided with and injured Puyol on 33 minutes, putting the ball out of play so that he could receive treatment. The Netherlands attempted to return the ball to Casillas from the resulting throw-in, but the bounce off the pitch surprised Casillas and he had to push the ball behind to prevent a Netherlands goal. The Netherlands returned the ball to him from the corner. Netherlands had two opportunities to score from a corner on 37 minutes, but van Bommel and then Mathijsen both failed to connect properly with their attempted shots. Pedro then ran upfield with the ball but his shot went wide of the goal. Shortly before half-time, Robben received the ball on the edge of the Spanish penalty area and his low shot towards the corner of the goal was saved by Casillas as the half ended 0–0.

=== Second half ===
There were no substitutions at half-time, and Spain kicked off the second half. They had the first opportunity of the half on 48 minutes, when the ball reached Capdevila around 6 yards (5 m) from goal, but he scuffed his attempted side-footed shot. Spain had a penalty appeal turned down on 50 minutes when van Bommel and Alonso were contesting the ball, after which the Netherlands moved down the field and crossed the ball into the Spanish penalty area, but no Netherlands players were able to reach the ball. A mix-up between Casillas and Puyol on 52 minutes led to a Netherlands throw-in, from which they built an attack, but it ended when van Persie's shot was claimed by Casillas. Spain then won a free kick around 25 yards (23 m) from goal, following a foul by van Bronckhorst for which he was booked. It was taken by Xavi, but went wide of the goal. On 56 minutes, Heitinga was booked for a foul on Villa and two minutes later the Netherlands won a free kick when Iniesta fouled Robben. The ball reached Heitinga in the penalty area, but he missed his shot although he was deemed to be offside. Spain made the first substitution of the match on 60 minutes, with Jesús Navas coming on in place of Pedro.

In the 62nd minute, Robben had what ESPN's Elko Born later described as "the most obvious opportunity to score during regular time". Receiving the ball from a Sneijder pass upfield, Robben was one-on-one with Casillas. He delayed his shot before attempting to flick the ball over the goalkeeper into the corner of the goal, but his shot lacked height and Casillas was able to put the ball out for a corner which the Dutch failed to score from. On 67 minutes, Capdevila was booked for a foul on van Persie, and three minutes later Spain had an opportunity when Villa received the ball 4 yards (4 m) from goal following a pass by Navas. His shot was parried behind by Stekelenburg, in what The Guardian's Scott Murray described as an "amazing save, terrible miss". The Netherlands made a change on 71 minutes, as Elia replaced Kuyt, before Spain won a free kick around 25 yards (23 m) from goal which Villa kicked wide. Spain had another chance a minute later as Alonso found Navas, who sent in a cross, but Villa missed with his attempted volley. On 77 minutes, Spain won a corner when Villa's shot was saved following a one-two with Xavi. The ball reached Ramos from the corner, who was unmarked 6 yards (5 m) from goal, but his header went over the crossbar. Robben then had a chance on 83 minutes, when he beat Puyol and attempted to take the ball around Casillas, but the goalkeeper dived low to take the ball from him before he could do so. Robben was booked for dissent, saying that Puyol had fouled him, and the game went to extra time, finishing 0–0 at the end of 90 minutes.

=== Extra time ===
Spain appealed for a penalty two minutes into the extra period, when Xavi went down following a clash with Heitinga, but it was not given. Three minutes later, Cesc Fàbregas, who had come on as a substitute for Alonso shortly before the end of regular time, received a pass from Iniesta and was one-on-one with the goalkeeper. He directed a shot low shot towards the corner of the goal, but Stekelenburg was able to claim the ball. This was followed by an opportunity for the Netherlands when Fàbregas impeded Casillas following a Netherlands corner. The ball reached Mathijsen, who was not marked but his attempt to head the ball into the goal from 6 yards (5 m) went over the crossbar. Spain then had two chances, first through Puyol, whose attempted header towards goal lacked power and direction, then through Iniesta who ran forward after receiving a pass from Fàbregas, but lost the ball to van Bronckhorst without being able to shoot or pass the ball to Navas, who was in space. The Netherlands then made their second change, bringing on van der Vaart for de Jong. On 101 minutes, Navas ran with the ball down the right-hand flank, following passes by Fàbregas and Villa, before hitting his shot into the side netting. Many spectators at the ground thought it had been a goal. Three minutes later, Fàbregas fired a shot which went just wide of the goalpost.

The Netherlands made a substitution in the 105th minute, bringing on Edson Braafheid for van Bronckhorst. After the extra-time interval, Spain substituted Fernando Torres for Villa. Braafheid made his first touch when defending a Xavi cross, the ball bouncing off the top of his head and into Stekelenburg's arms after he had turned away from it. Xavi then found Iniesta on the left of the field, but his attempted run into the penalty area was stopped when he was brought down by Heitinga. The referee gave Heitinga a second booking, which resulted in him being sent off, the fifth player to be dismissed in a World Cup final. Another booking followed for van der Wiel on 111 minutes when he fouled Iniesta, and Stekelenburg punched the ball clear from the resulting free kick before Navas hit a shot which went high into the stand behind the goal. On 115 minutes, the Netherlands won a free kick when Pique fouled Elia, which was taken by Sneijder. It deflected off the Spanish wall and Casillas fingertipped it behind, but the referee gave a goal kick instead of a corner. Spain then broke upfield through Torres, who passed into the centre where the ball bounced off a Netherlands defender. Fàbregas retrieved it and passed to Iniesta who was in space on the right-hand side of the penalty area. He took one touch with his right foot before striking the ball with his right foot on the half-volley past Stekelenburg into the left corner of the goal to give Spain the lead four minutes before the end. The Netherlands' players complained to the assistant referee about both the corner decision and what they believed was a foul on Elia that was not given. Mathijsen received a booking for throwing the ball into the pitch in anger while Iniesta was also booked for removing his shirt while celebrating his goal. Xavi was booked on 120 minutes for kicking the ball away and Torres went down in injury time with a hamstring issue but Spain held on to win the game 1–0 and win their first World Cup.

=== Details ===
11 July 2010
20:30

Netherlands	0–1 (a.e.t.)	Spain
		Iniesta 116'

Soccer City, Johannesburg
Attendance: 84,490
Referee: Howard Webb (England)

Netherlands	Spain

GK	1	Maarten Stekelenburg
RB	2	Gregory van der Wiel	(yellow card) 111'
CB	3	John Heitinga	(yellow card) 57' (yellow-red card) 109'
CB	4	Joris Mathijsen	(yellow card) 117'
LB	5	Giovanni van Bronckhorst (c)	(yellow card) 54'	(substituted off) 105'
CM	6	Mark van Bommel	(yellow card) 22'
CM	8	Nigel de Jong	(yellow card) 28'	(substituted off) 99'
RW	11	Arjen Robben	(yellow card) 84'
AM	10	Wesley Sneijder
LW	7	Dirk Kuyt		(substituted off) 71'
CF	9	Robin van Persie	(yellow card) 15'
Substitutions:
MF	17	Eljero Elia		(substituted on) 71'
MF	23	Rafael van der Vaart		(substituted on) 99'
DF	15	Edson Braafheid		(substituted on) 105'
Manager:
Bert van Marwijk

GK	1	Iker Casillas (c)
RB	15	Sergio Ramos	(yellow card) 23'
CB	3	Gerard Piqué
CB	5	Carles Puyol	(yellow card) 16'
LB	11	Joan Capdevila	(yellow card) 67'
DM	16	Sergio Busquets
DM	14	Xabi Alonso		(substituted off) 87'
CM	8	Xavi	(yellow card) 120+1'
RW	6	Andrés Iniesta	(yellow card) 118'
LW	18	Pedro		(substituted off) 60'
CF	7	David Villa		(substituted off) 106'
Substitutions:
MF	22	Jesús Navas		(substituted on) 60'
MF	10	Cesc Fàbregas		(substituted on) 87'
FW	9	Fernando Torres		(substituted on) 106'
Manager:
Vicente del Bosque

Man of the Match:
Andrés Iniesta (Spain)

Assistant referees:
Darren Cann (England)
Michael Mullarkey (England)
Fourth official:
Yuichi Nishimura (Japan)
Fifth official:
Toru Sagara (Japan)

Match rules:

- 90 minutes
- 30 minutes of extra-time if necessary
- Penalty shoot-out if scores still level
- Twelve named substitutes, of which up to three could be used

=== Statistics ===
Overall statistics
Statistic	Netherlands	Spain
Goals scored	0	1
Total shots	13	18
Shots on target	5	6
Ball possession	43%	57%
Corner kicks	6	8
Fouls committed	28	19
Offsides	7	6
Yellow cards	9	5
Red cards	1	0

== Post-match ==
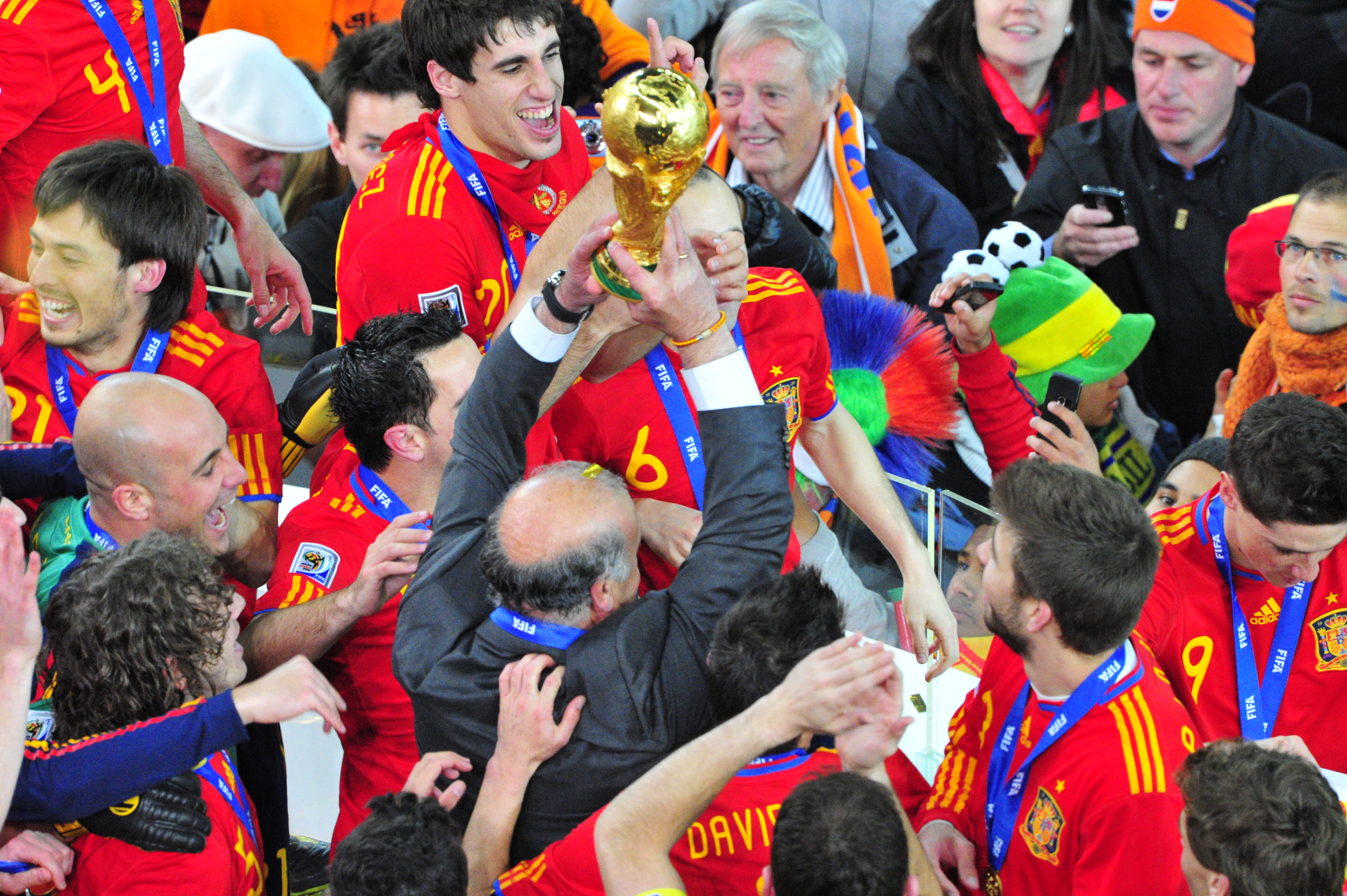
Manager Vicente del Bosque lifting the trophy with the Spanish players

The win was Spain's first World Cup title, and it lifted them to first place in the FIFA World Rankings with the Netherlands moving into second. Spain also became the first European nation to win a World Cup outside of Europe. At the conclusion of the match, the Spanish team changed into their red-shirted home kit for the presentation. These shirts already had a star over the emblem, signifying their World Cup victory. The Spain players formed a guard of honour for the Netherlands team as they went up to the stands to receive their runners-up medals. Afterwards, the red-shirted Spaniards went up to receive their medals, led by Xavi. Spain captain Casillas (who per tradition went last) was presented with the trophy by Zuma and FIFA president Sepp Blatter. As Casillas raised the trophy, a short version of the tournament's official anthem "Sign of a Victory" was played. Iniesta was named the man of the match, while Casillas won the Golden Glove from FIFA for the tournament's best goalkeeper and the Spanish team won the Fair Play Trophy.

With fourteen bookings during the match – nine to the Netherlands and five to Spain – the match set the record for the most bookings in a World Cup final, more than doubling the previous record of six from the 1986 final between West Germany and Argentina. The Netherlands players were critical of referee Webb, questioning why Heitinga was sent off for a second bookable offence, while Iniesta was not. Former Netherlands player Johan Cruyff was critical of his compatriots, however, saying that they had played "in a very dirty fashion", describing their contribution to the final as "ugly", "vulgar" and "anti-football". He added that the Netherlands should have had two players (Mark van Bommel and Nigel de Jong) sent off early in the match, and was critical of Webb for being too lenient on them. The Associated Press was of the opinion that the Netherlands had "turned far too often to dirty tactics". Webb himself said, in a subsequent interview, that "Having seen [the De Jong challenge] again from my armchair, I would red-card him. The trouble in the actual game was that I had a poor view of that particular incident".

The Netherlands team were welcomed back to Amsterdam by an estimated 700,000 supporters lining the banks of the canals, and team captain van Bronckhorst and coach Bert van Marwijk were named Knights in the Order of Orange-Nassau by Queen Beatrix. Further, there were also reports that noted the play-acting and fouls by some of the Spanish players. German footballer Franz Beckenbauer, who had won the World Cup as both a player and a manager, criticised the two teams and Webb, saying that the match was "lacking flow, [with] constant protests from the players and a referee who didn't have too much of an overview". Spain's ball-possession strategy in the World Cup final received mixed reactions. While some maintained that it was effective, but "boring", others claimed it was "beautiful".

FIFA estimated that 910 million viewers worldwide watched at least part of the final. In Spain, the final attracted 15.6 million total Spanish viewers across three networks, which represents 86% share of the audience, becoming the highest rated TV broadcast in Spanish history. Spain's previous record was set by the Euro 2008 quarter-final penalty shoot-out between Spain and Italy, which drew 14.1 million viewers. In the Netherlands, 12.2 million people watched the final on television, which was an estimated 74% of the total population of the country. (Note: The estimated population in 2010 was 16.58 million.)

Spain's next major tournament was UEFA Euro 2012, which they also won, beating Italy 4–0 in the final to complete three consecutive major tournament wins. At the subsequent 2014 World Cup in Brazil, Spain and Netherlands were both drawn in Group B, from which Spain failed to advance, finishing third in the group behind the Netherlands and Chile, as well as being beaten by the Netherlands 5–1 in the rematch from four years prior and Chile 2–0. The Netherlands went on to reach the semi-final, where they lost in a penalty shoot-out to Argentina, while Chile were eliminated in the Round of 16.

== See also ==
- Netherlands at the FIFA World Cup
- Spain at the FIFA World Cup
