= List of FIFA World Cup referees =

International football referees

The FIFA World Cup is a quadrennial international association football tournament organised by the Fédération Internationale de Football Association (FIFA). World Cup matches are officiated by referees from the FIFA International Referees List.

== World Cup Final match officials ==
Year	Referee	Assistant referees	Fourth official	Reserve/Fifth official	Video Assistant Referee (VAR) and Assistant VARs
1930	John Langenus (BEL)	Ulises Saucedo (BOL); Henri Christophe (BEL)	—	—	—
1934	Ivan Eklind (SWE)	Louis Baert (BEL); Mihály Iváncsics (HUN)	—	—	—
1938	Georges Capdeville (FRA)	Hans Wüthrich (SUI); Augustin Krist (BEL)	—	—	—
1954	William Ling (ENG)	Vincenzo Orlandini (ITA); Sandy Griffiths (WAL)	—	—	—
1958	Maurice Guigue (FRA)	Albert Dusch (FRG); Juan Gardeazábal Garay (ESP)	—	—	—
1962	Nikolay Latyshev (URS)	Leo Horn (NED); Bobby Davidson (SCO)	—	—	—
1966	Gottfried Dienst (SUI)	Tofiq Bahramov (URS); Karol Galba (TCH)	—	—	—
1970	Rudi Glöckner (GDR)	Rudolf Scheurer (SUI); Ángel Coerezza (ARG)	—	—	—
1974	Jack Taylor (ENG)	Alfonso González Archundía (MEX); Ramón Barreto Ruiz (URU)	—	—	—
1978	Sergio Gonella (ITA)	Ramón Barreto Ruiz (URU); Erich Linemayr (AUT)	—	—	—
1982	Arnaldo Cézar Coelho (BRA)	Abraham Klein (ISR); Vojtech Christov (TCH)	—	—	—
1986	Romualdo Arppi Filho (BRA)	Erik Fredriksson (SWE); Berny Ulloa Morera (CRC)	—	—	—
1990	Edgardo Codesal Méndez (MEX)	Armando Pérez Hoyos (COL); Michał Listkiewicz (POL)	—	—	—
1994	Sándor Puhl (HUN)	Venancio Zárate Vázquez (PAR); Mohammad Fanaei (IRN)	Francisco Lamolina (ARG)	—	—
1998	Said Belqola (MAR)	Mark Warren (ENG); Achmat Salie (RSA)	Abdul Rahman Al-Zaid (KSA)	—	—
2002	Pierluigi Collina (ITA)	Leif Lindberg (SWE); Philip Sharp (ENG)	Hugh Dallas (SCO)	—	—
2006	Horacio Elizondo (ARG)	Darío García (ARG); Rodolfo Otero (ARG)	Luis Medina Cantalejo (ESP)	Victoriano Giráldez Carrasco (ESP)	—
2010	Howard Webb (ENG)	Darren Cann (ENG); Michael Mullarkey (ENG)	Yuichi Nishimura (JPN)	Toru Sagara (JPN)	—
2014	Nicola Rizzoli (ITA)	Renato Faverani (ITA); Andrea Stefani (ITA)	Carlos Vera Rodríguez (ECU)	Christian Lescano Guerrero (ECU)	—
2018	Néstor Pitana (ARG)	Hernán Maidana (ARG); Juan Pablo Belatti (ARG)	Björn Kuipers (NED)	Erwin Zeinstra (NED)	Massimiliano Irrati (ITA); Mauro Vigliano (ARG); Carlos Astroza Cárdenas (CHI); Danny Makkelie (NED)
2022	Szymon Marciniak (POL)	Paweł Sokolnicki (POL); Tomasz Listkiewicz (POL)	Ismail Elfath (USA)	Kathryn Nesbitt (USA)	Tomasz Kwiatkowski (POL); Juan Soto Arévalo (VEN); Kyle Atkins (USA); Fernando Guerrero Ramírez (MEX); Corey Parker (USA); Bastian Dankert (GER)
2026	Slavko Vinčić (SVN)	Tomaž Klančnik (SVN); Andraž Kovačič (SVN)	Adham Makhadmeh (JOR)	Mohammad Al-Kalaf (JOR)	Bastian Dankert (GER); Nicolás Gallo Barragán (COL); Khamis Al-Marri (QAT)

=== By country ===
As of the 2026 FIFA World Cup final, 39 countries have been represented in the officials body of the FIFA World Cup final.

Country/NFA	Total	Referees	Assistant referees	Fourth officials	Reserves	VARs	Assistant VARs
Argentina	9	2	5	1			1
England	7	3	4				
Italy	7	3	3			1	
Poland	5	1	3			1	
Belgium	4	1	3				
Netherlands	4		1	1	1		1
United States	4			1	1		2
Mexico	3	1	1				1
Slovenia	3	1	2				
Spain	3		1	1	1		
Sweden	3	1	2				
Switzerland	3	1	2				
Brazil	2	2					
Colombia	2		1				1
Czechoslovakia	2		2				
Ecuador	2			1	1		
France	2	2					
Hungary	2	1	1				
Germany	2					1	1
Japan	2			1	1		
Jordan	2			1	1		
Scotland	2		1	1			
Soviet Union	2	1	1				
Uruguay	2		2				
Austria	1		1				
Bolivia	1		1				
Chile	1						1
Costa Rica	1		1				
East Germany	1	1					
Iran	1		1				
Israel	1		1				
Morocco	1	1					
Paraguay	1		1				
Qatar	1						1
Saudi Arabia	1			1			
South Africa	1		1				
Venezuela	1						1
Wales	1		1				
West Germany	1		1				
Total	94	22	44	9	6	3	10

=== By confederation ===
Confederation	Total	Referees	Assistant Referees	Reserve Referees	Reserve Assistant Referees	VARs	Assistant VARs
UEFA	51	15	28	3	2	2	1
CONMEBOL	20	4	10	2	1	0	3
AFC	7	0	1	3	2	0	1
CONCACAF	3	1	2	0	0	0	0
CAF	2	1	1	0	0	0	0
OFC	0	0	0	0	0	0	0
Totals:	83	21	42	8	5	2	5

== Number of matches ==
11 matches:

- (Uzbekistan) Ravshan Irmatov (2010, 2014, 2018)

9 matches:

- (Argentina) Néstor Pitana (2014, 2018)
- (Mexico) César Ramos Palazuelos (2018, 2022, 2026)
- (Iran) (Australia) Alireza Faghani (2018, 2022, 2026)
- (France) Clément Turpin (2018, 2022, 2026)

8 matches:

- (France) Joël Quiniou (1986, 1990, 1994)
- (Mexico) Benito Archundia Téllez (2006, 2010)
- (Uruguay) Jorge Larrionda Pietrafesa (2006, 2010)

7 matches:

- (Belgium) John Langenus (1930, 1934, 1938)
- (Wales) (Wales) Sandy Griffiths (1950, 1954, 1958)
- (Spain) Juan Gardeazábal Garay (1958, 1962, 1966)
- (United Arab Emirates) Ali Bujsaim (1994, 1998, 2002)
- (Brazil) Carlos Eugênio Simon (2002, 2006, 2010)
- (Belgium) Frank De Bleeckere (2006, 2010)
- (Mexico) Marco Rodríguez Moreno (2006, 2010, 2014)
- (Netherlands) Björn Kuipers (2014, 2018)
- (Poland) Szymon Marciniak (2018, 2022, 2026)
- (Brazil) Wilton Sampaio (2022, 2026)

6 matches:

- (Sweden) Ivan Eklind (1934, 1938, 1950)
- (England) Arthur Edward Ellis (1950, 1954, 1958)
- (Soviet Union) Nikolay Latyshev (1958, 1962)
- (Syria) Jamal Al Sharif (1986, 1990, 1994)
- (Mexico) Arturo Brizio Carter (1994, 1998)
- (Egypt) Gamal Al-Ghandour (1998, 2002)
- (Colombia) Óscar Ruiz Acosta (2002, 2006, 2010)
- (Italy) Roberto Rosetti (2006, 2010)
- (England) Howard Webb (2010, 2014)
- (United States) Mark Geiger (2014, 2018)
- (Brazil) Sandro Meira Ricci (2014, 2018)
- (Turkey) Cüneyt Çakır (2014, 2018)
