= 2014 FIFA World Cup Group B =

Football tournament group stage

Group B of the 2014 FIFA World Cup consisted of both finalists of the previous World Cup in Spain (defending champions), the Netherlands (previous runners-up), Chile, and Australia. Play began on 13 June and ended on 23 June 2014. The Netherlands and Chile progressed to the knockout stage, while Australia and Spain were eliminated after suffering two defeats in their opening two matches. Chile were eliminated by hosts Brazil in the round of 16 on penalties, while the Netherlands made their way to the semi-finals in which they lost to eventual runners-up Argentina, also on penalties. The Netherlands won the match for third place with a convincing 3–0 victory against Brazil.

== Teams ==
Draw position	Team	Confederation	Method of qualification	Date of qualification	Finals appearance	Last appearance	Previous best performance	FIFA Rankings	
Draw position	Team	Confederation	Method of qualification	Date of qualification	Finals appearance	Last appearance	Previous best performance	October 2013 (Note: The rankings of October 2013 were used for seeding for the final draw.)	June 2014
B1 (seed)	Spain	UEFA	UEFA Group I winners	15 October 2013	14th	2010	Winners (2010)	1	1
B2	Netherlands	UEFA	UEFA Group D winners	10 September 2013	10th	2010	Runners-up (1974, 1978, 2010)	8	15
B3	Chile	CONMEBOL	CONMEBOL third place	15 October 2013	9th	2010	Third place (1962)	12	14
B4	Australia	AFC	AFC fourth round Group B runners-up	18 June 2013	4th	2010	Round of 16 (2006)	57	62

== Standings ==
Pos	Team	Pld	W	D	L	GF	GA	GD	Pts	Qualification
1	Netherlands	3	3	0	0	10	3	+7	9	Advance to knockout stage
2	Chile	3	2	0	1	5	3	+2	6	Advance to knockout stage
3	Spain	3	1	0	2	4	7	−3	3	
4	Australia	3	0	0	3	3	9	−6	0	

Source: FIFA
Rules for classification: Tie-breaking criteria
- Netherlands advanced to play Mexico (runner-up of Group A) in the round of 16.
- Chile advanced to play Brazil (winner of Group A) in the round of 16.

== Matches ==
=== Spain vs Netherlands ===
External videos
- Spain v Netherlands (Brazil 2014) on YouTube

The two teams had met in 9 previous matches, including in the 2010 FIFA World Cup Final, won by Spain 1–0 after extra time. This was the first time in the FIFA World Cup that the previous finalists met in the group stage.

Halfway into the first half, the referee judged that Diego Costa caught a trailing leg from Stefan de Vrij's attempted tackle. Xabi Alonso scored the penalty kick for Spain, shooting into the bottom-right corner with his right foot, putting them into the lead. They were unable to keep the lead until half time though, with Robin van Persie scoring a 15-yard diving looping header after a long ball from Daley Blind from the left after he spotted Iker Casillas slightly off his line. In the second half, Blind assisted another goal for Netherlands, this time setting up Arjen Robben who controlled the pass before coming inside to finish with his left foot from ten yards out. Twelve minutes later, Netherlands scored again, as De Vrij headed the ball in from a tight angle from a Wesley Sneijder free kick on the left. Spanish goalkeeper Iker Casillas protested that he had been fouled by Van Persie, but the goal was allowed to stand and Casillas received a yellow card for his protest. Not long after this, a backpass from Sergio Ramos was miscontrolled by Casillas with his left leg, resulting in Van Persie gathering the ball and scoring into an empty net for his second goal of the game. The fifth goal for Netherlands was a solo effort from Robben. Having received the ball near the halfway line from a Wesley Sneijder pass, he outran Ramos, Jordi Alba and Casillas, before slotting the ball into the net from 10 yards out with his left foot.

The 5–1 scoreline was the biggest loss margin for a defending champion in the FIFA World Cup, and also Spain's second biggest loss in the World Cup after their 6–1 thrashing against Brazil in 1950. With their goals, Van Persie and Robben became the first Dutch players to score in three World Cups. Casillas and Xavi joined Andoni Zubizarreta as the only Spanish players to appear in four World Cups.

13 June 2014
16:00 BRT (UTC−3)

Spain	1–5	Netherlands
Alonso 27' (pen.)		Van Persie 44', 72'; Robben 53', 80'; De Vrij 64'

Itaipava Arena Fonte Nova, Salvador
Attendance: 48,173
Referee: Nicola Rizzoli (Italy)

Spain	Netherlands

GK	1	Iker Casillas (c)	(yellow card) 65'
RB	22	César Azpilicueta
CB	3	Gerard Piqué
CB	15	Sergio Ramos
LB	18	Jordi Alba
RM	8	Xavi
CM	16	Sergio Busquets
LM	14	Xabi Alonso		(substituted off) 62'
RW	21	David Silva		(substituted off) 78'
LW	6	Andrés Iniesta
CF	19	Diego Costa		(substituted off) 62'
Substitutions:
FW	9	Fernando Torres		(substituted on) 62'
FW	11	Pedro		(substituted on) 62'
MF	10	Cesc Fàbregas		(substituted on) 78'
Manager:
Vicente del Bosque

GK	1	Jasper Cillessen
CB	2	Ron Vlaar
CB	3	Stefan de Vrij	(yellow card) 41'	(substituted off) 77'
CB	4	Bruno Martins Indi
RWB	7	Daryl Janmaat
LWB	5	Daley Blind
CM	8	Jonathan de Guzmán	(yellow card) 25'	(substituted off) 62'
CM	6	Nigel de Jong
AM	10	Wesley Sneijder
CF	9	Robin van Persie (c)	(yellow card) 66'	(substituted off) 79'
CF	11	Arjen Robben
Substitutions:
MF	20	Georginio Wijnaldum		(substituted on) 62'
DF	13	Joël Veltman		(substituted on) 77'
FW	17	Jeremain Lens		(substituted on) 79'
Manager:
Louis van Gaal

Man of the Match:
Robin van Persie (Netherlands)

Assistant referees:
Renato Faverani (Italy)
Andrea Stefani (Italy)
Fourth official:
Svein Oddvar Moen (Norway)
Fifth official:
Kim Haglund (Norway)

=== Chile vs Australia ===
The two teams had met in five previous matches, including in the 1974 FIFA World Cup group stage, a 0–0 draw.

Chile took a 2–0 lead within the first 15 minutes. First, Alexis Sánchez controlled an Eduardo Vargas header in the penalty area to slot home. Two minutes later, Jorge Valdivia's shot from a Sánchez pass doubled the lead. Australia pulled one back through a Tim Cahill header from a cross by Ivan Franjic before half time. Australia could not find the equaliser in the second half, and in stoppage time, Chilean substitute Jean Beausejour converted the rebound after Mauricio Pinilla's shot was saved by Mathew Ryan.

With their respective goals, Cahill became the first Australian player to score in three World Cups, while Beausejour became the first Chilean player to score in two World Cups.

13 June 2014
18:00 AMT (UTC−4)

Chile	3–1	Australia
Sánchez 12'; Valdivia 14'; Beausejour 90+2'		Cahill 35'

Arena Pantanal, Cuiabá
Attendance: 40,275
Referee: Noumandiez Doué (Ivory Coast)

Chile	Australia

GK	1	Claudio Bravo (c)
RB	4	Mauricio Isla
CB	17	Gary Medel
CB	18	Gonzalo Jara
LB	2	Eugenio Mena
RM	20	Charles Aránguiz	(yellow card) 86'
CM	21	Marcelo Díaz
LM	8	Arturo Vidal		(substituted off) 60'
RF	7	Alexis Sánchez
CF	10	Jorge Valdivia		(substituted off) 68'
LF	11	Eduardo Vargas		(substituted off) 88'
Substitutions:
MF	16	Felipe Gutiérrez		(substituted on) 60'
MF	15	Jean Beausejour		(substituted on) 68'
FW	9	Mauricio Pinilla		(substituted on) 88'
Manager:
(Argentina) Jorge Sampaoli

GK	1	Mathew Ryan
RB	2	Ivan Franjic		(substituted off) 49'
CB	22	Alex Wilkinson
CB	6	Matthew Špiranović
LB	3	Jason Davidson
CM	15	Mile Jedinak (c)	(yellow card) 58'
CM	5	Mark Milligan	(yellow card) 67'
RW	7	Mathew Leckie
AM	23	Mark Bresciano		(substituted off) 78'
LW	11	Tommy Oar		(substituted off) 68'
CF	4	Tim Cahill	(yellow card) 44'
Substitutions:
DF	19	Ryan McGowan		(substituted on) 49'
MF	10	Ben Halloran		(substituted on) 68'
MF	14	James Troisi		(substituted on) 78'
Manager:
Ange Postecoglou

Man of the Match:
Alexis Sánchez (Chile)

Assistant referees:
Songuifolo Yeo (Ivory Coast)
Jean-Claude Birumushahu (Burundi)
Fourth official:
Roberto Moreno (Panama)
Fifth official:
Eric Boria (United States)

=== Australia vs Netherlands ===
The two teams had met in three previous matches, all in friendlies, most recently in 2009.

The Netherlands took the lead after Arjen Robben collected a Daley Blind headed pass at the halfway line, burst into the penalty area and scored with a low shot to the goalkeepers left. Soon after the restart, Australia equalised through Tim Cahill's left-foot volley into the goal from the underside of the bar from Ryan McGowan's cross. Australia took the lead in the second half with Mile Jedinak's penalty, awarded for a handball by Daryl Janmaat, but Robin van Persie equalised after he received substitute Memphis Depay's pass and scored. Ten minutes later, Memphis Depay received a pass from Jonathan de Guzmán and his long-range effort beat Australia goalkeeper Mathew Ryan.

At the age of 20, Depay's goal made him the Netherlands' youngest scorer at World Cups.

18 June 2014
13:00 BRT (UTC−3)

Australia	2–3	Netherlands
Cahill 21'; Jedinak 54' (pen.)		Robben 20'; Van Persie 58'; Depay 68'

Estádio Beira-Rio, Porto Alegre
Attendance: 42,877
Referee: Djamel Haimoudi (Algeria)

Australia	Netherlands

GK	1	Mathew Ryan
RB	19	Ryan McGowan
CB	22	Alex Wilkinson
CB	6	Matthew Špiranović
LB	3	Jason Davidson
CM	15	Mile Jedinak (c)
CM	17	Matt McKay
RW	7	Mathew Leckie
AM	23	Mark Bresciano		(substituted off) 51'
LW	11	Tommy Oar		(substituted off) 77'
CF	4	Tim Cahill	(yellow card) 43'	(substituted off) 69'
Substitutions:
MF	13	Oliver Bozanić		(substituted on) 51'
MF	10	Ben Halloran		(substituted on) 69'
FW	9	Adam Taggart		(substituted on) 77'
Manager:
Ange Postecoglou

GK	1	Jasper Cillessen
CB	2	Ron Vlaar
CB	3	Stefan de Vrij
CB	4	Bruno Martins Indi		(substituted off) 45+3'
RWB	7	Daryl Janmaat
LWB	5	Daley Blind
CM	8	Jonathan de Guzmán		(substituted off) 78'
CM	6	Nigel de Jong
AM	10	Wesley Sneijder
CF	9	Robin van Persie (c)	(yellow card) 47'	(substituted off) 87'
CF	11	Arjen Robben
Substitutions:
MF	21	Memphis Depay		(substituted on) 45+3'
MF	20	Georginio Wijnaldum		(substituted on) 78'
FW	17	Jeremain Lens		(substituted on) 87'
Manager:
Louis van Gaal

Man of the Match:
Arjen Robben (Netherlands)

Assistant referees:
Rédouane Achik (Morocco)
Abdelhak Etchiali (Algeria)
Fourth official:
Bakary Gassama (Gambia)
Fifth official:
Evarist Menkouande (Cameroon)

=== Spain vs Chile ===
The two teams had met in ten previous matches, including twice in the FIFA World Cup group stage, both won by Spain (1950: 2–0; 2010: 2–1).

Chile opened the scoring when Charles Aránguiz squared a pass to Eduardo Vargas to score home in the penalty area. Near the end of the first half Alexis Sánchez's free kick was parried by Spanish goalkeeper Iker Casillas to Aránguiz who put in the rebound. Spain, which needed at least a point to stay alive in the competition, had its best chance in the second half which fell to Sergio Busquets, but he missed from close range. Spain's loss confirmed the qualification of both Chile and the Netherlands into the knockout stage, and eliminated both Spain and Australia.

Spain became the fifth defending champions to be knocked out in the group stage.

18 June 2014
16:00 BRT (UTC−3)

Spain	0–2	Chile
		Vargas 20'; Aránguiz 43'

Estádio do Maracanã, Rio de Janeiro
Attendance: 74,101
Referee: Mark Geiger (United States)

Spain	Chile

GK	1	Iker Casillas (c)
RB	22	César Azpilicueta
CB	4	Javi Martínez
CB	15	Sergio Ramos
LB	18	Jordi Alba
CM	16	Sergio Busquets
CM	14	Xabi Alonso	(yellow card) 41'	(substituted off) 46'
RW	21	David Silva
AM	6	Andrés Iniesta
LW	11	Pedro		(substituted off) 76'
CF	19	Diego Costa		(substituted off) 64'
Substitutions:
MF	17	Koke		(substituted on) 46'
FW	9	Fernando Torres		(substituted on) 64'
MF	20	Santi Cazorla		(substituted on) 76'
Manager:
Vicente del Bosque

GK	1	Claudio Bravo (c)
CB	17	Gary Medel
CB	5	Francisco Silva
CB	18	Gonzalo Jara
RM	4	Mauricio Isla
CM	20	Charles Aránguiz		(substituted off) 64'
CM	21	Marcelo Díaz
LM	2	Eugenio Mena	(yellow card) 61'
AM	8	Arturo Vidal	(yellow card) 26'	(substituted off) 88'
CF	11	Eduardo Vargas		(substituted off) 85'
CF	7	Alexis Sánchez
Substitutions:
MF	16	Felipe Gutiérrez		(substituted on) 64'
MF	10	Jorge Valdivia		(substituted on) 85'
MF	6	Carlos Carmona		(substituted on) 88'
Manager:
(Argentina) Jorge Sampaoli

Man of the Match:
Eduardo Vargas (Chile)

Assistant referees:
Sean Hurd (United States)
Joe Fletcher (Canada)
Fourth official:
Nawaf Shukralla (Bahrain)
Fifth official:
Yaser Tulefat (Bahrain)

=== Australia vs Spain ===
The two teams had never met before. Australia forward Tim Cahill was suspended for the match due to accumulation of yellow cards.

In a match between two already-eliminated teams, Spain went in front in the 36th minute after Andrés Iniesta threaded a pass down the right to overlapping full-back Juanfran, who then crossed the ball low to David Villa to finish with a back flick of his right foot low to the net. In the second half, Fernando Torres scored Spain's second with a low finish from the left of the penalty area after a pass from Iniesta, before substitute Juan Mata, receiving a pass from Cesc Fàbregas, scored from the right of the penalty area with a low shot between the goalkeeper's legs.

Villa's goal was his ninth career World Cup goal. Already Spain's record World Cup goalscorer, he also joined Fernando Hierro, Raúl and Julio Salinas as Spanish players who had scored in three World Cups.

23 June 2014
13:00 BRT (UTC−3)

Australia	0–3	Spain
		Villa 36'; Torres 69'; Mata 82'

Arena da Baixada, Curitiba
Attendance: 39,375
Referee: Nawaf Shukralla (Bahrain)

Australia	Spain

GK	1	Mathew Ryan
RB	19	Ryan McGowan
CB	6	Matthew Špiranović	(yellow card) 88'
CB	22	Alex Wilkinson
LB	3	Jason Davidson
CM	17	Matt McKay
CM	15	Mile Jedinak (c)	(yellow card) 90+2'
CM	13	Oliver Bozanić		(substituted off) 72'
RW	7	Mathew Leckie
CF	9	Adam Taggart		(substituted off) 46'
LW	11	Tommy Oar		(substituted off) 61'
Substitutions:
MF	10	Ben Halloran		(substituted on) 46'
MF	14	James Troisi		(substituted on) 61'
MF	23	Mark Bresciano		(substituted on) 72'
Manager:
Ange Postecoglou

GK	23	Pepe Reina
RB	5	Juanfran
CB	2	Raúl Albiol
CB	15	Sergio Ramos (c)	(yellow card) 62'
LB	18	Jordi Alba
CM	14	Xabi Alonso		(substituted off) 83'
CM	17	Koke
AM	6	Andrés Iniesta
RW	20	Santi Cazorla		(substituted off) 68'
LW	7	David Villa		(substituted off) 56'
CF	9	Fernando Torres
Substitutions:
MF	13	Juan Mata		(substituted on) 56'
MF	10	Cesc Fàbregas		(substituted on) 68'
MF	21	David Silva		(substituted on) 83'
Manager:
Vicente del Bosque

Man of the Match:
David Villa (Spain)

Assistant referees:
Yaser Tulefat (Bahrain)
Ebrahim Saleh (Bahrain)
Fourth official:
Norbert Hauata (Tahiti)
Fifth official:
Aden Marwa (Kenya)

=== Netherlands vs Chile ===
The two teams had never met before. Netherlands forward Robin van Persie was suspended for the match due to accumulation of yellow cards.

With both teams already assured of qualifying for the knockout stage after their first two matches, this match would decide which team would win the group: the Netherlands needed only a draw while Chile needed a win. The Netherlands went in front in the 77th minute with a header from six yards by substitute Leroy Fer after a Daryl Janmaat cross from the right. Another substitute Memphis Depay got the second in injury time, when he scored from close range after Arjen Robben had made a run down the left before crossing from the byline. With this win the Netherlands won Group B with a perfect record of three wins out of three, while Chile finished as group runners-up.

23 June 2014
13:00 BRT (UTC−3)

Netherlands	2–0	Chile
Fer 77'; Depay 90+2'

Arena de São Paulo, São Paulo
Attendance: 62,996
Referee: Bakary Gassama (Gambia)

Netherlands	Chile

GK	1	Jasper Cillessen
RB	7	Daryl Janmaat
CB	2	Ron Vlaar
CB	3	Stefan de Vrij
LB	5	Daley Blind	(yellow card) 64'
RM	20	Georginio Wijnaldum
CM	6	Nigel de Jong
LM	15	Dirk Kuyt		(substituted off) 89'
AM	10	Wesley Sneijder		(substituted off) 75'
SS	11	Arjen Robben (c)
CF	17	Jeremain Lens		(substituted off) 69'
Substitutions:
MF	21	Memphis Depay		(substituted on) 69'
MF	18	Leroy Fer		(substituted on) 75'
DF	14	Terence Kongolo		(substituted on) 89'
Manager:
Louis van Gaal

GK	1	Claudio Bravo (c)
CB	17	Gary Medel
CB	5	Francisco Silva	(yellow card) 25'	(substituted off) 70'
CB	18	Gonzalo Jara
RWB	4	Mauricio Isla
LWB	2	Eugenio Mena
CM	20	Charles Aránguiz
CM	21	Marcelo Díaz
AM	16	Felipe Gutiérrez		(substituted off) 46'
CF	7	Alexis Sánchez
CF	11	Eduardo Vargas		(substituted off) 81'
Substitutions:
MF	15	Jean Beausejour		(substituted on) 46'
MF	10	Jorge Valdivia		(substituted on) 70'
FW	9	Mauricio Pinilla		(substituted on) 81'
Manager:
(Argentina) Jorge Sampaoli

Man of the Match:
Arjen Robben (Netherlands)

Assistant referees:
Evarist Menkouande (Cameroon)
Felicien Kabanda (Rwanda)
Fourth official:
Joel Aguilar (El Salvador)
Fifth official:
William Torres (El Salvador)

== See also ==
- Australia at the FIFA World Cup
- Chile at the FIFA World Cup
- Netherlands at the FIFA World Cup
- Spain at the FIFA World Cup
