= Jean Beausejour =

Chilean footballer (born 1984)

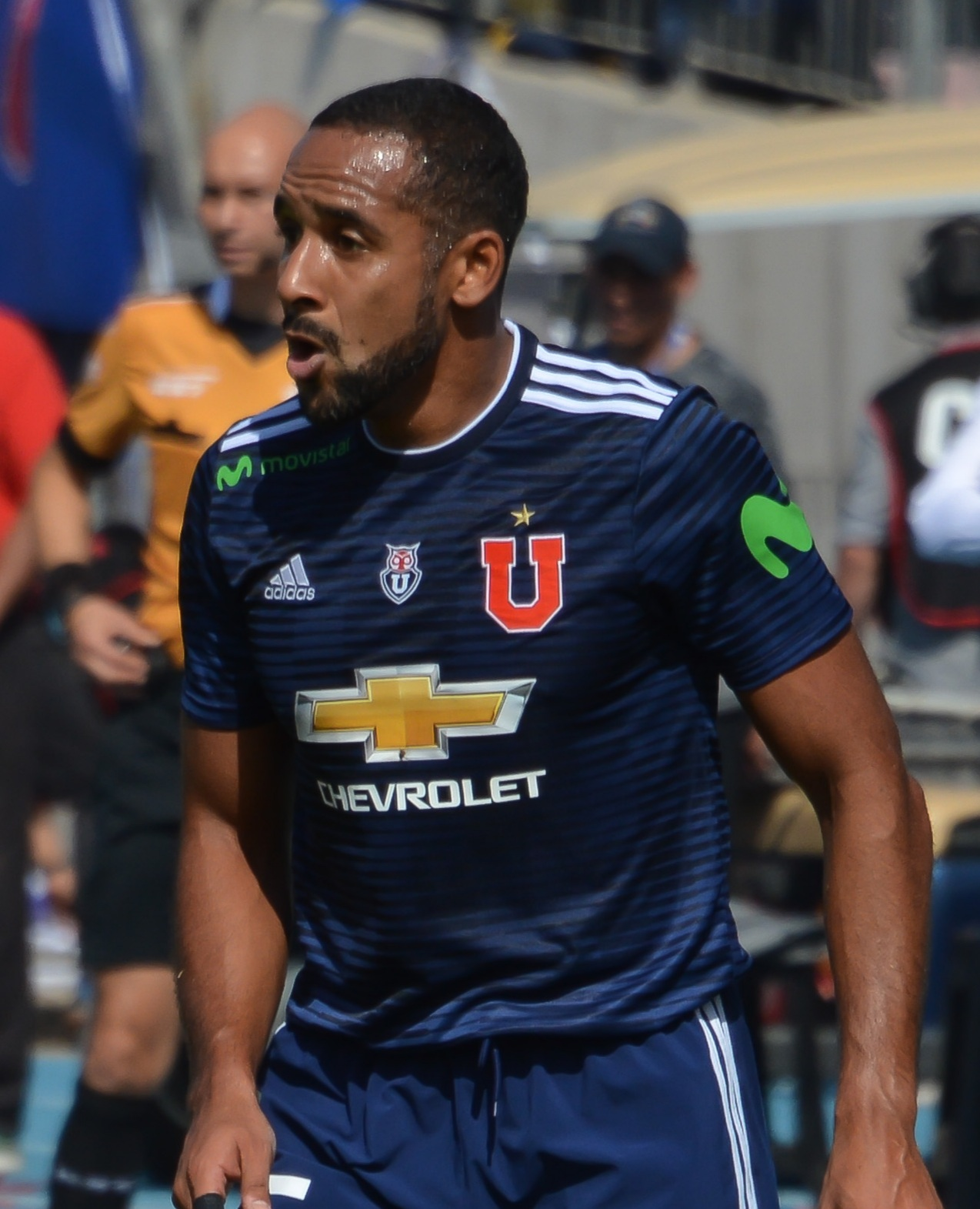
- Beausejour with Universidad de Chile in 2018

Personal information
- Full name: Jean André Emanuel Beausejour Coliqueo
- Date of birth: 1 June 1984 (age 42)
- Place of birth: Santiago, Chile
- Height: 1.78 m (5 ft 10 in)
- Position: Left wing-back

Youth career
- 1994–1998: Universidad de Chile
- 1999–2002: Universidad Católica

Senior career*
Years	Team	Apps	(Gls)
2002–2004	Universidad Católica	16	(3)
2003	→ Universidad de Concepción (loan)	30	(3)
2004–2005	Servette	13	(1)
2005	Grêmio	55	(7)
2006	Gent	0	(0)
2007	Cobreloa	22	(0)
2008	O'Higgins	34	(13)
2009–2010	América	45	(3)
2010–2012	Birmingham City	39	(3)
2012–2014	Wigan Athletic	85	(3)
2014–2016	Colo-Colo	54	(7)
2016–2021	Universidad de Chile	93	(1)
2021	Coquimbo Unido	22	(0)
Total		508	(44)

International career
2004	Chile U23	7	(2)
2004–2021	Chile	109	(6)
Medal record
Men's football
Representing Chile
Copa América
Winner	2015 Chile
Winner	2016 United States
FIFA Confederations Cup
Runner-up	2017 Russia
- * Club domestic league appearances and goals

Jean André Emanuel Beausejour Coliqueo (Spanish pronunciation: [ˈɟʝam boseˈʝuɾ]; born 1 June 1984) is a Chilean former professional footballer who played as a left-sided wing-back.

He played in Chile, Switzerland, Brazil, Belgium, Mexico and England, where he won the League Cup with Birmingham City and the FA Cup with Wigan Athletic.

Beausejour made his debut for the Chile national team in 2004 and his 100th appearance for his country in 2018. He was a member of the Copa América-winning squads in 2015 and 2016, and is the only Chilean to score in two consecutive World Cups (2010 and 2014).

== Personal life ==
Beausejour was born in Santiago. His father, Jean Coty Beausejour, was an Afro-Haitian graduate student who went on to work for the United Nations, and his mother, Viviana Coliqueo Collipay, is a Chilean of Mapuche ethnicity whose father, Andres, had migrated to the city to find work. Beausejour's parents separated when he was very young, and he was raised by his mother and her parents; he regards his grandfather as his father-figure. The family lived in Villa Carmelitas, in the Estación Central commune of Santiago, where Beausejour was educated at Escuela Profesor Ramón del Río, Colegio Holanda and Liceo Guillermo Feliú Cruz. In 2010, the local council declared him an Hijo Ilustre, 'honoured son', of the community, and six years later a new sports centre was named after him.

In the 2000s, he had a brief spell in the career of kinesiology at the University of the Americas, where he studied thanks to a scholarship. Nevertheless, he didn't finish that bachelor of Arts degree.

Because of his dark skin, in 2004 the media nicknamed him "Palmatoria" after a black character from Barrabases (a football-themed children's comic); despite reports that he hated the name, he says it did not bother him, and that being black caused him fewer problems than did the indigenous Mapuche heritage with which he closely identifies.

Beausejour is married to Karina Ugarte. As of January 2016, the couple had two children, Joaquín and Luciano. Joaquín has played football in the junior ranks of Universidad Católica, the club where his father completed his youth development.

In the radio program Los Tenores (The Tenors) from ADN Radio, Jean stated that Keven Beausejour, a Canadian boxer who competed at the 2023 Pan American Games, is his cousin, son of his Haitian aunt Evianne. However, Keven stated not knowing Jean, revealing it was a joke.

== Club career ==
=== Early career ===
As a 10-year-old, Beausejour attended a public trial with the local senior club, Universidad de Chile, and was one of four boys chosen to go through further selection procedures to join the club's youth system. At 14, he was released. After a trial with city rivals Universidad Católica, he was accepted into their youth system where he continued his football development.

He began his professional career at Universidad Católica. In 2002, he debuted after being loaned to Universidad de Concepción where he had an impressive season alongside Jorge Valdivia.

In June 2004, he joined Swiss club Servette, reuniting with Valdivia to play in the UEFA Cup. He scored once from 11 appearances in the Swiss Super League before the club went bankrupt in February 2005 and it lost its licence to compete at that level. His goal, Servette's third in a 4–1 win away to Schaffhausen, proved costly to the player who supplied the cross, Paulo Diogo, who leapt onto the perimeter fence in celebration, caught his wedding ring in the metalwork, and when he jumped down, much of his finger was torn away along with the ring. The finger had to be amputated.

In July 2005, Beausejour signed a short-term deal with Brazilian club Grêmio, where he helped the team to win the Série B title.

He joined KAA Gent of Belgium on 31 January 2006 on an 18-month contract, but made no appearances and returned to Chile after a year where he signed for Cobreloa.

In January 2008, Beausejour joined O'Higgins where he was used as left winger by Jorge Sampaoli and re-gained status after impressing once again. His performances led him to the Chile national team coached by Marcelo Bielsa who usually used him in the same position.

On 1 December 2008, it was reported that Beausejour completed a three-and-a-half-year deal with Mexican club América. He made his debut on 4 January 2009 during a 1–1 draw with rivals Guadalajara, scoring the opening goal.

Following a one-and-a-half-year spell with the México DF–based side and his FIFA World Cup participation, he signed a three-year contract with Premier League side Birmingham City for an undisclosed fee in August 2010.

=== Birmingham City ===
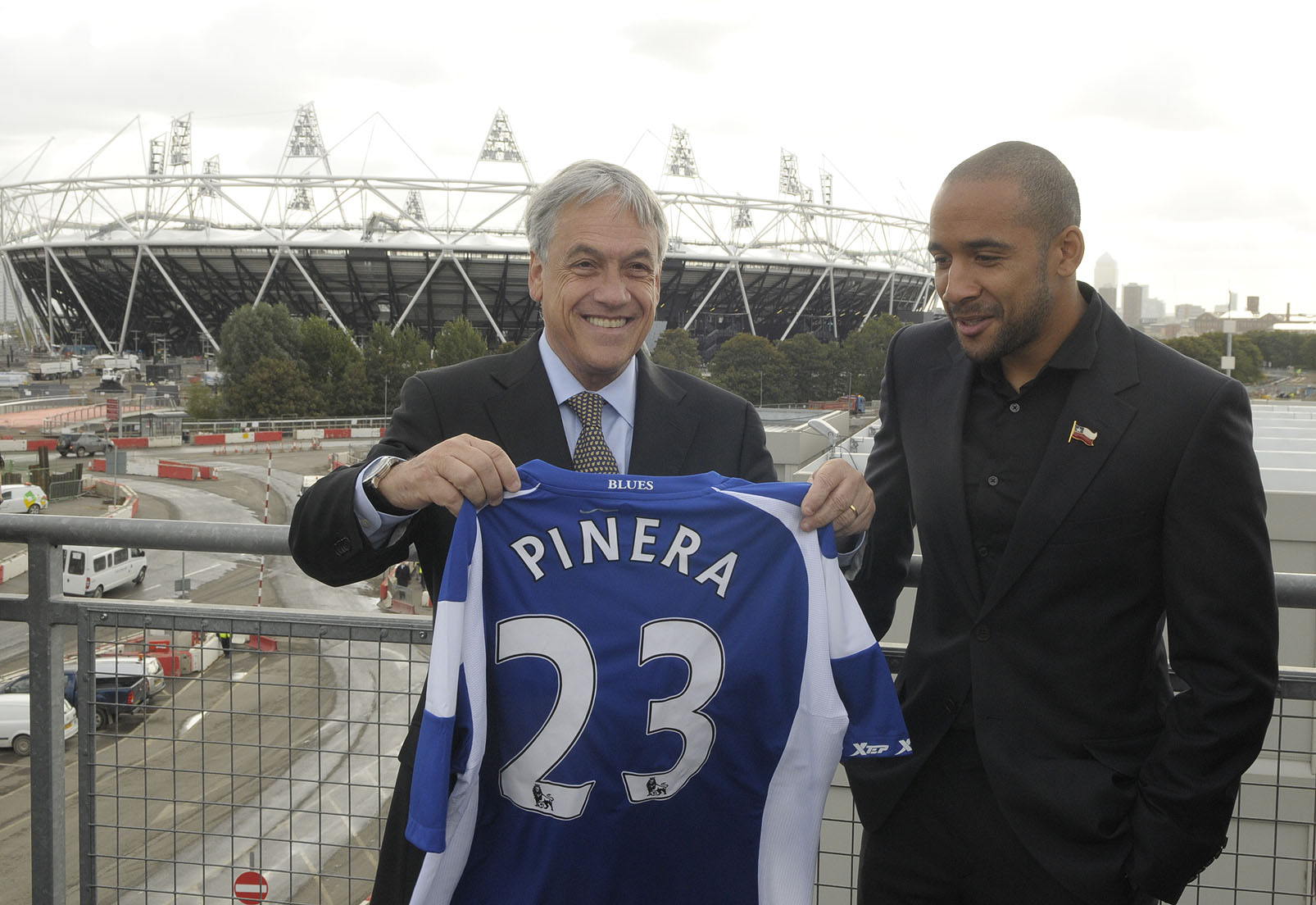
Beausejour with President of Chile Sebastián Piñera, holding a Birmingham City shirt, at London's Olympic Park

After 18 months with the Mexico City-based club followed by a "tremendous" World Cup, Beausejour signed a three-year contract with Premier League club Birmingham City for an undisclosed fee in August 2010. Manager Alex McLeish stated that Beausejour was a player that had been on their "list of targets for a long time because he is strong and quick with the ability to beat his man and get crosses in." His debut was delayed while he awaited a working visa, but he made his first appearance on 18 September as a late substitute, replacing Alexander Hleb in the 83rd minute as Birmingham lost 3–1 at West Bromwich Albion. He made more impact on his first start, setting up goals for Hleb and Nikola Žigić in the 3–1 League Cup victory over MK Dons. Described by the Sunday Mirror as "at the heart of everything good about Birmingham" in the FA Cup third round against Millwall, Beausejour provided the assist for the opening goal and "crashed a 20-yard strike off the bar". He scored his first goal for the club six minutes into the FA Cup fifth-round defeat of Sheffield Wednesday, with a side-footed shot from a Lee Bowyer cut-back. He was a second-half substitute as Birmingham won the 2011 League Cup, beating favourites Arsenal 2–1 at Wembley Stadium, thus earning qualification for the Europa League. On 5 March 2011, Beausejour scored his first Premier League goal in a 3–1 defeat at home to West Bromwich Albion, and his second came four days later in a 1–1 draw at Everton. But his club struggled with injuries for most of the 2010–11 season, and were relegated from the Premier League.

Beausejour was the Birmingham Mail's man of the match in Birmingham's first appearance in major European competition for nearly 50 years, the Europa League play-off round first leg against Portuguese club Nacional, which finished goalless. Just days after manager Chris Hughton suggested he wanted more from Beausejour in an attacking role, the player had an eventful man-of-the-match performance as Birmingham beat Leicester City 2–0. In the first few minutes of the second half, he "hit the angle of post and bar with a fierce shot", was considered fortunate by visiting manager Sven-Göran Eriksson to escape a second yellow card, and was tripped by Andy King to earn a penalty kick from which Marlon King opened the scoring. In the Europa League group stage, an error by Beausejour led to Club Brugge's second goal, but he scored from the rebound after Žigić's shot was blocked and was fouled for the penalty from which King equalised. His first league goal of the season came against Burnley in November, again from a rebound, in the second minute of a match that Birmingham won 2–1 in stoppage time.

=== Wigan Athletic ===
On 25 January 2012, Beausejour joined Premier League club Wigan Athletic for an undisclosed fee, signing a two-and-a-half-year contract. He made his debut in the 3–1 defeat against Tottenham Hotspur at White Hart Lane on 31 January. On his home debut, against Everton, his man-of-the-match performance featured a "low cross [that] struck Phil Neville on the foot, before heading in the direction of Tim Howard, but the ball spun sharply, slipping through the American's grasp" for an own goal. Beausejour slotted well into the 3–4–3 formation playing at left wing back. He helped his team reach the 2013 FA Cup Final, but a hamstring injury meant he missed the match itself, in which Wigan beat Manchester City 1–0 at Wembley to win the first major trophy in their history. Beausejour's second consecutive Premier League relegation was confirmed just days later after a 4–1 defeat at the hands of Arsenal.

He left Wigan Athletic in June 2014 when his contract expired.

=== Colo-Colo ===
==== 2014–15 season ====
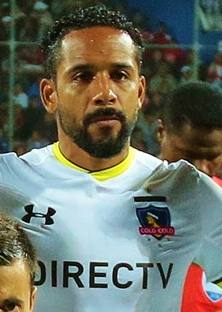
Beausejour with Colo-Colo

After his participation in the World Cup, Beausejour returned to Chile to play for recent league champions Colo-Colo. He signed a two-year contract at reported wages of 34 million pesos ($68,000 approx.) a month. International clearance permitting, coach Héctor Tapia planned to put Beausejour straight into the starting eleven at left back at the expense of Luis Pavez, but he made his competitive debut in the second match of the Torneo Apertura, on 27 June against Deportes Iquique. Colo-Colo won 2–0, both goals scored by Esteban Paredes. On 31 August, Beausejour scored his first competitive goal in a 4–0 home win over Deportes Antofagasta. After scoring his second goal, on 14 September against Palestino in a 3–1 away win, he was sent off for striking Leonardo Valencia and received a two-match suspension. His first match back after the ban was the superclásico against Universidad de Chile on 19 October, in which he scored his side's second goal in a 2–0 victory at the Estadio Monumental.

On 30 December 2014, Beausejour appeared in the club's 3–2 Noche Alba win over Unión Española at which the club presented new signings Humberto Suazo and Luis Pedro Figueroa. They made a poor start to the Clausura with a 1–0 defeat at home to San Marcos de Arica on 4 January 2015, but ended a four-match winless streak with a 2–0 win away to O'Higgins in which Beausejour scored his first goal of the season. He started the most part of the tournament as full back, completing fourteen games and one goal in a tournament which Colo-Colo finished runner-up.

==== 2015–16 season ====
For the 2015–16 season under new coach José Luis Sierra, Beausejour returned to his original position of left winger. On 15 September, he scored his fifth competitive goal for the club, his first of the 2015 Apertura, in a 3–1 home win over Unión La Calera that extended the team's perfect start to six league matches. Beausejour produced his second consecutive goal in Chilean derbies when he opened the scoring with a header in Colo-Colo's 2–0 victory over Universidad de Chile on 31 October. On 6 December, he finally won a domestic league title as Colo-Colo clinched their 31st in embarrassing circumstances: rivals Universidad Católica lost to Audax Italiano, while Colo-Colo's match, away to Santiago Wanderers, was abandoned before it started because of violent incidents by their own supporters.

=== Retirement ===
On January 28, 2022, he announced his retirement as a professional footballer despite having offers from several clubs to spend more time with his family.

== International career ==
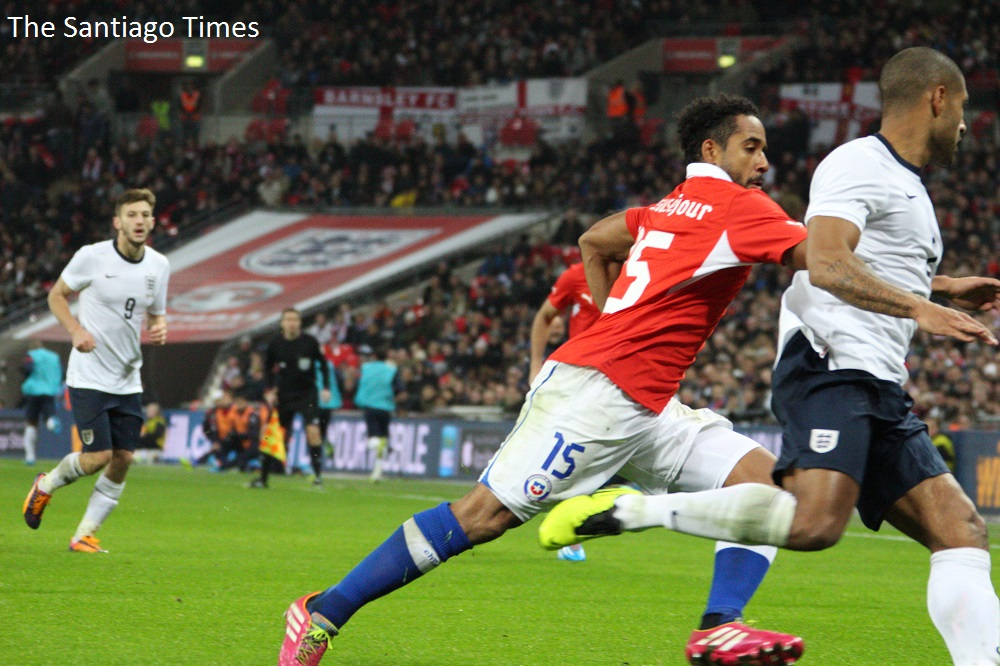
Beausejour in a friendly match against England at Wembley Stadium in November 2013

Beausejour has played for Chile at under-23 and senior levels. He was capped for Chile at the 2004 South American Pre-Olympic Tournament alongside players such as Jorge Valdivia, Mark González, Claudio Bravo and Rodrigo Millar. However, the team failed to qualify for the Athens Olympics, finishing bottom of the final stage after topping their first-stage group, which included Brazil and eventual qualifiers Paraguay.

He made his senior debut in a friendly against Mexico in the United States on 18 February 2004, and made the assist for Reinaldo Navia's goal in a 1–1 draw. He played twice more that year, but did not appear again until 2008. His first international goal came on 10 June 2009 in a 4–0 defeat of Bolivia at the Estadio Nacional in a World Cup qualifier.

Marcelo Bielsa named Beausejour in Chile's 23-man squad for the 2010 World Cup finals. He scored the only goal of their first group match against Honduras on 16 June, which was the first match that Chile had won at a World Cup since 1962. He played in all Chile's matches at the tournament until their elimination by Brazil in the round of 16.

During the 2014 FIFA World Cup qualification process, he and four teammates were dropped from the national team by coach Claudio Borghi before a match against Uruguay in 2011 because they returned to Chile's training camp late and intoxicated after attending the baptism of Valdivia's child. The Asociación Nacional de Fútbol Profesional (ANFP) increased the suspension to ten matches, and Borghi said that while he remained coach, neither Beausejour nor Valdivia would be selected even after the ban. Nevertheless, Borghi recalled Beausejour and Gonzalo Jara to the squad as soon as they had served their time, for a friendly against Colombia, and Beausejour made his first international appearance for a year in a World Cup qualifier against Ecuador. After Borghi was replaced by Jorge Sampaoli, Beausejour's former coach at O'Higgins, he played most of the remaining World Cup qualification process, alongside Valdivia, who was recalled to the squad in March 2013.

Despite scepticism as to Sampaoli putting loyalty ahead of form where Beausejour was concerned, he was included in the 23-man squad for the 2014 FIFA World Cup in Brazil. During the first group match, he scored with a shot from outside the box that beat Australia goalkeeper Mathew Ryan to complete his side's 3–1 victory and become the first ever Chilean to score in two different World Cup tournaments.

Beausejour was a member of Chile's 2015 Copa América squad that won the tournament for the first time. He played the whole 120 minutes of the final, in which Chile beat Argentina 4–1 on penalties at the Estadio Nacional. He and his country repeated their success in the following year's centenary edition. Again he played the full 120 minutes of the final against Argentina, which again finished goalless after extra time. This time he took and converted the fourth penalty as Chile went on to win the shootout 4–2. Along with seven of his teammates, Beausejour was included in the Tournament Best XI. The 2015 victory qualified Chile for the 2017 Confederations Cup. Beausejour started the first two group matches and was unused in the third. He came back into the team for the semifinal, in which Chile beat Portugal 3–0 on penalties, and started in the final, which Chile lost 1–0 to Germany.

In a friendly against Denmark on 27 March 2018, Beausejour and Arturo Vidal became the sixth and seventh players to make their 100th appearances for Chile.

== Career statistics ==
=== Club ===
Appearances and goals by club, season and competition
Club	Season	League			National cup (Note: Includes FA Cup, Copa Chile)		League cup (Note: Includes Football League Cup)		Continental		Other		Total	
Club	Season	Division	Apps	Goals	Apps	Goals	Apps	Goals	Apps	Goals	Apps	Goals	Apps	Goals
Club América	2008–09	Liga MX	17	0	–		–		–		3 (Note: Appearances in InterLiga)	1	20	1
Club América	2009–10	Liga MX	28	3	–		–		–		4	0	32	3
Club América	2010–11	Liga MX	2	0	–		–		–		–		2	0
Club América	Total		47	3	–		–		–		7	1	54	4
Birmingham City	2010–11	Premier League	17	2	4	1	4	0	—		—		25	3
Birmingham City	2011–12	Championship	22	1	2	0	1	0	6 (Note: Appearances in UEFA Europa League)	1	—		31	3
Birmingham City	Total		39	3	6	1	5	0	6	1	—		56	6
Wigan Athletic	2011–12	Premier League	16	0	—		—		—		—		16	0
Wigan Athletic	2012–13	Premier League	34	1	3	0	2	0	—		—		39	1
Wigan Athletic	2013–14	Championship	33	2	4	0	1	0	3	0	2 (Note: Appearances in Championship play-offs)	0	43	2
Wigan Athletic	Total		83	3	7	0	3	0	3	0	2	0	98	3
Colo-Colo	2014–15	Chilean Primera División	29	4	1	0	–		5 (Note: Appearances in Copa Libertadores)	0	–		35	4
Colo-Colo	2015–16	Chilean Primera División	25	3	5	2	–		6	0	–		36	5
Colo-Colo	Total		64	7	6	2	–		11	0	–		81	9
Universidad de Chile	2016–17	Chilean Primera División	26	1	3	0	–		–		1 (Note: Appearance in Supercopa de Chile)	0	27	1
Universidad de Chile	2017	Chilean Primera División	11	0	2	0	–		1 (Note: Appearance in Copa Sudamericana)	0	–		14	0
Universidad de Chile	2018	Chilean Primera División	15	0	6	1	–		5	0	–		26	1
Universidad de Chile	2019	Chilean Primera División	17	0	4	0	–		2	0	–		23	0
Universidad de Chile	2020	Chilean Primera División	24	0	0	0	–		2	0	–		26	0
Universidad de Chile	Total		93	1	15	1	–		10	0	1	0	119	2
Coquimbo Unido	2021	Primera B de Chile	22	0	1	0	–		–		–		23	0
Career total			348	17	35	4	8	0	30	1	10	1	429	24

=== International ===
As of match played 17 November 2020

Chile
Year	Apps	Goals
2004	3	0
2008	9	0
2009	11	1
2010	8	1
2011	12	1
2012	3	0
2013	11	2
2014	8	1
2015	8	0
2016	12	0
2017	13	0
2018	3	0
2019	6	0
2020	2	0
Total	109	6

International goals Scores and results list Chile's tally first, score column indicates score after each Beausejour goal.

No.	Date	Venue	Opponent	Score	Result	Competition	Ref.
1.	10 June 2009	Estadio Nacional de Chile, Santiago, Chile	Bolivia	1–0	4–0	2010 FIFA World Cup qualification	
2.	16 June 2010	Mbombela Stadium, Nelspruit, South Africa	Honduras	1–0	1–0	2010 FIFA World Cup	
3.	29 March 2011	Kyocera Stadion, The Hague, Netherlands	Colombia	2–0	2–0	Friendly	
4.	14 August 2013	Brøndby Stadium, Brøndbyvester, Denmark	Iraq	4–0	6–0	Friendly	
5.	14 August 2013	Brøndby Stadium, Brøndbyvester, Denmark	Iraq	5–0	6–0	Friendly	
6.	13 June 2014	Arena Pantanal, Cuiabá, Brazil	Australia	3–1	3–1	2014 FIFA World Cup	

== Post-retirement ==
In February 2022, he joined ESPN Chile, along with the former footballer Diego Rivarola, as a football commentator and analyst. He also joined ADN Radio as a panelist of the program Los Tenores de ADN.

In December 2024, Beausejour graduated as a football manager at INAF (National Institute of Football, Sports and Physical Activity of Chile).

== Honours ==
Universidad Católica

- Primera División de Chile: 2002 Apertura

Grêmio

- Série B: 2005

Birmingham City

- Football League Cup: 2010–11

Wigan Athletic

- FA Cup: 2012–13

Colo-Colo

- Primera División de Chile: 2015 Apertura

Universidad de Chile

- Primera División de Chile: 2017 Clausura

Coquimbo Unido

- Primera B de Chile: 2021

Chile

- Copa América: 2015, 2016
- FIFA Confederations Cup runner-up: 2017

Individual

- Copa América Team of the Tournament: 2016

== See also ==
- List of men's footballers with 100 or more international caps
