= Darren Cann =

Darren Cann may refer to:

- Darren Cann (footballer), English footballer
- Darren Cann (assistant referee), English assistant football referee
