= Vicente del Bosque =

Spanish footballer and manager (born 1950)

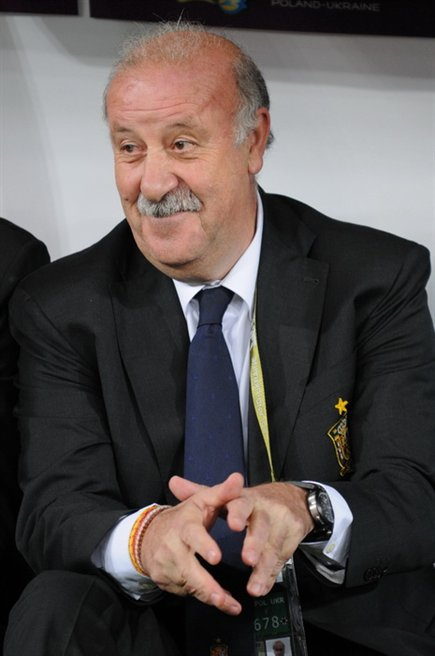
- Del Bosque managing Spain at the UEFA Euro 2012 Final

Personal information
- Full name: Vicente del Bosque González
- Date of birth: 23 December 1950 (age 75)
- Place of birth: Salamanca, Spain
- Height: 1.84 m (6 ft 0 in)
- Position: Defensive midfielder

Youth career
- 1966–1967: Salmantino
- 1967–1968: Real Madrid

Senior career*
Years	Team	Apps	(Gls)
1967–1968	Real Madrid B	11	(5)
1968–1984	Real Madrid	239	(14)
1970–1971	→ Castellón (loan)	13	(4)
1971–1972	→ Córdoba (loan)	19	(1)
1972–1973	→ Castellón (loan)	30	(5)
Total		301	(24)

International career
1969	Spain U18	1	(0)
1970–1976	Spain Amateur	3	(0)
1975–1980	Spain	18	(1)

Managerial career
- 1987–1990: Real Madrid Castilla
- 1994: Real Madrid
- 1996: Real Madrid (caretaker)
- 1999–2003: Real Madrid
- 2004–2005: Beşiktaş
- 2008–2016: Spain
Medal record
Men's football
Representing Spain (as manager)
FIFA World Cup
Winner	2010 South Africa
UEFA European Championship
Winner	2012 Poland-Ukraine
FIFA Confederations Cup
Bronze medal – third place	2009 South Africa
Runner-up	2013 Brazil
- * Club domestic league appearances and goals

Vicente del Bosque González, 1st Marquess of Del Bosque (Spanish pronunciation: [biˈθente ðel ˈβoske ɣonˈθaleθ]; born 23 December 1950) is a Spanish former football manager and player. Regarded as one of the greatest managers of all time, he is to date the only football manager to have won the World Cup, the Champions League, the European Championship, and the Intercontinental Cup.

After taking over from Luis Aragonés – who had led Spain to European success at UEFA Euro 2008 – del Bosque led the national team to their first FIFA World Cup in 2010, and then to retain their European Championship in 2012. Before that, Del Bosque coached Real Madrid from 1999 to 2003, one of the most successful periods in the club's modern era. During his playing career, del Bosque made over 400 appearances for Real Madrid, winning five La Liga titles and four Copas del Rey. He played internationally with the senior Spain national team on 18 occasions.

== Playing career ==
As a player, del Bosque was a midfielder who played in La Liga 441 times with 30 goals. This career included spells at Castilla CF, Córdoba, Castellón and Real Madrid. He won five league titles (1974–75, 1975–76, 1977–78, 1978–79, 1979–80) and four Copa del Rey titles (1973–74, 1974–75, 1979–80, 1981–82) with Real Madrid. He was also part of the Real Madrid team that lost to Liverpool in the 1981 European Cup final. Internationally, del Bosque received 18 caps with the Spain national team, scoring one goal. He appeared for Spain at UEFA Euro 1980, which would be disappointing for Spain as it exited at the group stage of the competition.

== Managerial career ==
=== Real Madrid ===
Del Bosque served at Real Madrid since 1984 and rose through the ranks at the club; however, he only first managed Madrid for a couple of months in 1994 after the sacking of Benito Floro and before the appointment of Jorge Valdano. He would again manage Real for two games in 1996, while he was the youth team coach, after Jorge Valdano was sacked and before Arsenio Iglesias took the job until the end of that season. But in 1999–2000, the club management decided to give him the full-time job after difficulties with their coach, John Toshack, with del Bosque taking over in November 1999.

In his four seasons in charge, del Bosque ushered the club through one of its most successful spells in modern history, having steered the club to two UEFA Champions League titles in 2000 and 2002, two domestic La Liga titles in 2001 and 2003, a Supercopa de España in 2001, a UEFA Super Cup in 2002, the Intercontinental Cup in 2002 as well as finishing in the last four of the UEFA Champions League every year he was in charge. Not since the great Madrid side of the 1950s and 1960s that had Alfredo Di Stéfano and Ferenc Puskás did the club succeed so consistently. Del Bosque was credited with a humble, patient and unassuming style which saw him manage the club as it underwent a policy during Florentino Pérez's tenure as club president that was known as Los Galácticos, where the world's best and most marketable stars were signed for the club beginning with Luís Figo and including David Beckham, Zinedine Zidane and Ronaldo. In the del Bosque era Real managed 104 wins out of a possible 186 in his time as coach of Madrid. Despite the level of success, many players – in particular the so-called Galácticos – were bought without the input of del Bosque amid often made allegations that the Real Madrid hierarchy (in particular Pérez and general manager Jorge Valdano) had more control over transfer policy, team selection and other aspects of club that minimised the level of control del Bosque had during his time as manager.

Real Madrid decided not to renew Del Bosque's contract in 2003, just a day after he won the club its 29th Liga title and a week after the club signed David Beckham. Del Bosque was offered the post of technical director but turned it down, leading to many suggestions in Spanish media that there was a much rumoured political split at the club involving del Bosque and several players, especially captain Fernando Hierro (who was asked to leave the club in the summer of 2003), on one side, while Valdano and Pérez wielded the axe of control to, in their words, "shake up the team," on the other. Pérez said in an interview with BBC Sport, "del Bosque was showing signs of exhaustion. I want to be sincere about this – our belief that he was not the right coach for the future."

The BBC article states: "It is a strange tale from start to finish – how the shy, mustachioed man from Salamanca came to be in charge of the most expensive and talented bunch of footballers in the modern game, won the biggest trophies on offer and then got the boot in favour of a man yet to be named. With the Real superstars, del Bosque was extremely popular – partly because he was happier to let them get on with it. Cool as a cryogenically-frozen cucumber, he managed to avoid confrontations with his charges, despite the stellar egos in the squad, and never once lost his calm in front of the media."

In the four years since Del Bosque's departure, Real Madrid changed seven coaches and did not win any major trophies until they won the La Liga title in 2007, under new coach Fabio Capello (who was also sacked afterwards). They had also been defeated in the round of 16 of the Champions League every year since the 2004–05 season (one year after Del Bosque was sacked), until the 2010–11 Champions League season, which saw Real Madrid defeat Lyon in the round of 16 under new manager José Mourinho. It would take until the 2013–14 campaign for the club to win another Champions League title, under manager Carlo Ancelotti.

=== Beşiktaş and hiatus ===
After Iñaki Sáez resigned in the wake of a terrible performance at UEFA Euro 2004, which saw Spain having their worst result in the tournament since 1988, del Bosque was approached as a possible manager of the national side. He was not interested in the job, however, and it was subsequently given to Luis Aragonés. With Beşiktaş, del Bosque arrived in Turkey to much fanfare and hope, but failure to deliver results saw him get the sack towards the tail end of the 2004–05 season. After Mexico were eliminated by Argentina in the 2006 FIFA World Cup, del Bosque was approached with an offer to become their manager, but declined. During the 2007 Real Madrid crisis, del Bosque spoke on the line saying that the departure of Ronaldo was a mistake, and he was one of the candidates to replace Fabio Capello as manager of the team. Bernd Schuster, however, was awarded the job on 9 July 2007.

=== Spain national team ===
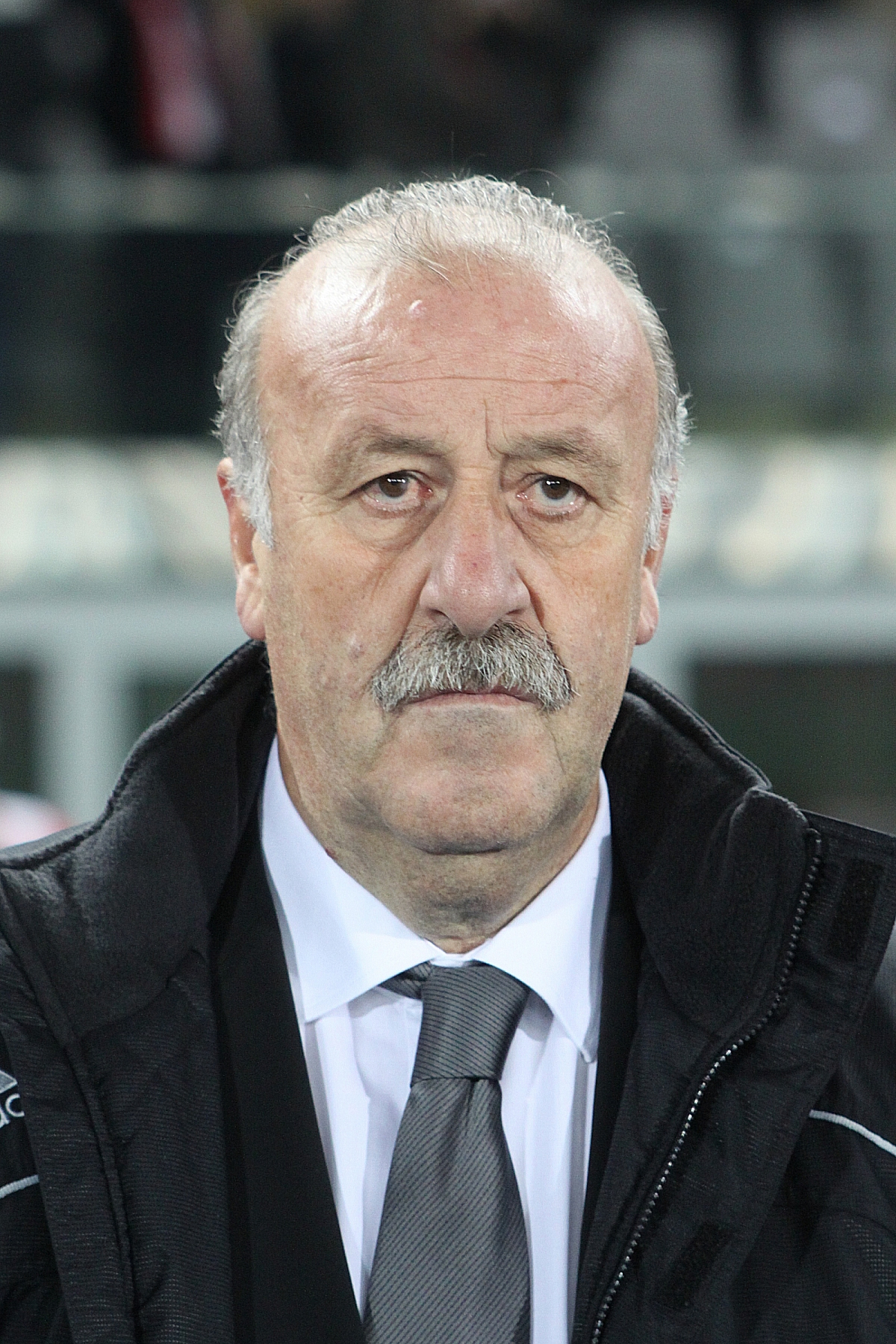
Del Bosque as Spain head coach in 2009

On 11 March 2008, del Bosque announced that he would replace Luis Aragonés as head coach of the Spain national team; it was confirmed on 15 July 2008. Spain under del Bosque began their 2010 FIFA World Cup qualification campaign successfully, defeating Bosnia and Herzegovina 1–0 with a goal from David Villa. Spain defeated Armenia 4–0 three days later with two goals coming from Villa, and one each from Joan Capdevila and Marcos Senna, with a notable debut from Bojan, coming on as a substitute and defeating rumours that he will swap allegiances to Serbia. This win secured the Spaniards a first place spot in their group with six points. The next round saw Spain defeat Estonia 3–0, then, four days later, beat Belgium 2–1 away – an 88th-minute strike from Villa (his fifth of the campaign) earning them the win. This result maintained their 100% start to the qualifying campaign.

Since del Bosque was appointed to the job, 38 players have debuted with the Spain team: Bojan, Andoni Iraola, Fernando Llorente, Diego Capel, Sergio Busquets, Jesús Navas, Diego López, Gerard Piqué, Jordi Alba, Pedro, Pablo Hernández, Borja Valero, Bruno, Nacho Monreal, Víctor Valdés, Álvaro Negredo, Juan Mata, Javi Martínez, Thiago, Manu, Aritz Aduriz, Adrián, Juanfran, Beñat, Iker Muniain, Javi García, Álvaro Domínguez, Markel Susaeta, Koke, Marc Bartra, Isco, César Azpilicueta, Iñigo Martínez, Alberto Moreno, Mario Suárez, Michu, Cristian Tello, Diego Costa, Ander Iturraspe, David de Gea and Gerard Deulofeu, while one uncapped player, Fernando Amorebieta, has been called up but failed to debut.

On 9 June 2009, in a friendly against Azerbaijan in which Spain won 6–0, del Bosque became the first manager in all of football history to win his first ten games as debut manager of a national team, the previous record being nine held by João Saldanha of Brazil. The record currently stands at 13 successive victories, with the last winning match being a 2–0 win against South Africa in the 2009 Confederations Cup, followed by a 2–0 defeat in the semi-final stage of the same competition against United States.

On 14 October 2009, Spain joined the very small number of teams to have won all their World Cup qualifying games in a single campaign, achieving a record-breaking ten wins in ten games. In Spain's first game of the 2010 FIFA World Cup on 16 June, they lost 1–0 to Switzerland. Spain bounced back and won group H by winning the next two games. They faced Portugal in the Round of 16, winning 1–0, and defeated Paraguay in their quarter-final match, again by 1–0. Spain then defeated Germany in the semi-final on 7 July 2010, winning 1–0, allowing them to reach their first World Cup final. In the final against the Netherlands, he led his team to victory after a goal scored in extra time by Andrés Iniesta. Upon this triumph, he became the oldest coach to win the World Cup, until he was surpassed by his compatriot Luis de la Fuente in 2026.

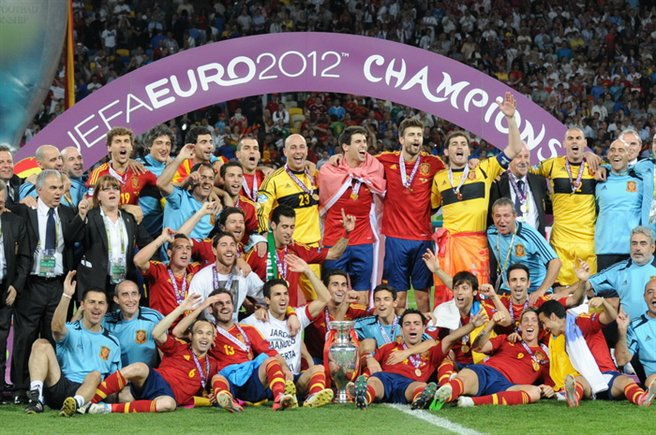
Del Bosque celebrating winning UEFA Euro 2012 with Spain

On 1 July 2012, del Bosque led Spain to victory at Euro 2012, hosted by Poland and Ukraine. Spain defeated Italy 4–0 in the final in Kyiv to win a second consecutive European championship. In the 2013 FIFA Confederations Cup held in Brazil, Spain advanced to the final, played against Brazil; but suffered a heavy 3–0 defeat. A goal from Neymar and a brace from Fred saw a heavy burden landing on del Bosque and his type of football tactics he used, tiki-taka.

In the 2014 FIFA World Cup, del Bosque and his team posted their worst finish in the finals since the World Cup in France in 1998 through being eliminated during the group stage following a 5–1 defeat to the Netherlands and a 2–0 defeat to Chile, before a 3–0 dead rubber win over Australia. The heavy opening defeat to the Netherlands marked the first time Spain had conceded five or more goals in an international game since a 6–2 defeat to Scotland in 1963, and only the second time they had conceded five or more goals in a World Cup game, having done so before in their 6–1 defeat to Brazil in 1950, which incidentally was also held in Brazil. The result was also the biggest margin of defeat by a defending champion at a World Cup. Furthermore, despite a 3–0 win rounding of their campaign following the 2–0 defeat to Chile, Spain's final standing of 23rd out of the 32 entered teams was their worst-ever finish at a World Cup. After this, he announced that he would resign as Spain's manager, but there was no reaction from the RSFF.

Del Bosque announced his intentions to resign as the Spain national team coach following UEFA Euro 2016, in which Spain as defending champions were eliminated by Italy in the round of 16. On 14 June 2015, he reached 100 matches as Spain coach in a UEFA Euro 2016 qualifying win over Belarus in Barysaw. At the age of 65, and having achieved every available top-tier title, del Bosque announced his retirement from the sport on 30 June 2016.

== Personal life ==
Del Bosque married María de la Santísima Trinidad "Trini" López, and has three children – two sons and one daughter.

== Career statistics ==
=== Club ===
Appearances and goals by club, season and competition
Club	Season	League			Cup		League Cup		Continental		Other		Total	
Club	Season	Division	Apps	Goals	Apps	Goals	Apps	Goals	Apps	Goals	Apps	Goals	Apps	Goals
Real Madrid	1968–69	La Liga	0	0	0	0	—		0	0	—		0	0
Real Madrid	1969–70	La Liga	0	0	0	0	—		0	0	—		0	0
Real Madrid	1973–74	La Liga	16	0	7	5	—		1 (Note: Appearances in UEFA Cup)	0	—		24	5
Real Madrid	1974–75	La Liga	25	2	7	0	—		4 (Note: Appearances in European Cup Winners' Cup)	0	—		36	2
Real Madrid	1975–76	La Liga	30	2	3	0	—		8 (Note: Appearances in European Cup)	0	—		41	2
Real Madrid	1976–77	La Liga	25	1	1	0	—		3	1	—		29	2
Real Madrid	1977–78	La Liga	18	3	4	1	—		—		—		22	4
Real Madrid	1978–79	La Liga	30	2	9	0	—		4	1	—		43	3
Real Madrid	1979–80	La Liga	32	0	6	1	—		8	1	—		46	2
Real Madrid	1980–81	La Liga	29	2	3	0	—		5	0	—		37	2
Real Madrid	1981–82	La Liga	23	2	5	0	—		6	0	—		34	2
Real Madrid	1982–83	La Liga	6	0	4	0	4	1	3	0	0	0	17	1
Real Madrid	1983–84	La Liga	5	0	5	0	0	0	0	0	—		10	0
Real Madrid	Total		239	14	54	7	4	1	42	3	0	0	339	25
Castellón (loan)	1970–71	Segunda División	13	4	0	0	—		—		—		13	4
Castellón (loan)	1972–73	La Liga	30	5	8	0	—		—		—		38	5
Castellón (loan)	Total		43	9	8	0	—		—		—		51	9
Córdoba (loan)	1971–72	La Liga	19	1	0	0	—		—		—		19	1
Córdoba (loan)	Total		19	1	0	0	—		—		—		19	1
Career total			301	24	62	7	4	1	42	3	0	0	409	35

=== International ===
Appearances and goals by national team and year
National team	Year	Apps	Goals
Spain	1975	3	0
Spain	1976	3	0
Spain	1977	1	0
Spain	1978	4	1
Spain	1979	5	0
Spain	1980	2	0
Total		18	1

Scores and results list Spain's goal tally first

List of international goals scored by Vicente del Bosque
#	Date	Venue	Opponent	Score	Result	Competition
1	13 December 1978	El Helmántico, Villares de la Reina, Spain	Cyprus	2–0	5–0	Euro 1980 qualifying

=== Managerial statistics ===
Team	Nat	From	To	Record							
Team	Nat	From	To	G	W	D	L	GF	GA	GD	Win %
Real Madrid Castilla	(Spain)	11 June 1987	25 June 1990	114	42	31	41	144	145	−1	36.84
Real Madrid	(Spain)	7 March 1994	30 June 1994	13	5	2	6	23	22	+1	38.46
Real Madrid	(Spain)	21 January 1996	24 January 1996	1	1	0	0	5	0	+5	100.00
Real Madrid	(Spain)	17 November 1999	23 June 2003	203	113	49	41	461	267	+194	55.67
Beşiktaş	(Turkey)	8 June 2004	27 January 2005	25	11	7	7	40	25	+15	44.00
Spain	(Spain)	1 July 2008	30 June 2016	114	87	10	17	254	79	+175	76.32
Total				470	259	99	112	927	538	+389	55.11

== Honours ==
=== Player ===
Real Madrid

- La Liga: 1974–75, 1975–76, 1977–78, 1978–79, 1979–80
- Copa del Rey: 1973–74, 1974–75, 1979–80, 1981–82

=== Manager ===
Real Madrid

- La Liga: 2000–01, 2002–03
- Supercopa de España: 2001
- Copa Iberoamericana: 1994
- UEFA Champions League: 1999–2000, 2001–02
- UEFA Super Cup: 2002
- Intercontinental Cup: 2002

Spain

- FIFA World Cup: 2010
- UEFA European Championship: 2012

=== Individual ===
- UEFA Club Coach of the Year: 2002
- IFFHS World's Best Club Coach: 2002
- IFFHS World's Best National Coach: 2009, 2010, 2012, 2013
- World Manager of the Year: 2012
- FIFA World Coach of the Year: 2012
- ESPN 11th Greatest Manager of All Time: 2013
- World Soccer 13th Greatest Manager of All Time: 2013
- France Football 33rd Greatest Manager of All Time: 2019

=== Personal ===
- Nobility: Created 1st Marquess of Del Bosque by King Juan Carlos I
- Government of Spain: Grand Cross of the Royal Order of Sporting Merit
- Salamanca Provincial Council: Gold Medal
- Salamanca City Council: Favourite Son of Salamanca

== See also ==
- National team managers with 100 or more matches
- List of Intercontinental Cup winning managers
- Tiki-taka

Spanish nobility
New title	Marquess of Del Bosque; 2011–	Incumbent; Heir: Vicente del Bosque López
