= Rodrigo Millar =

Chilean footballer (born 1981)

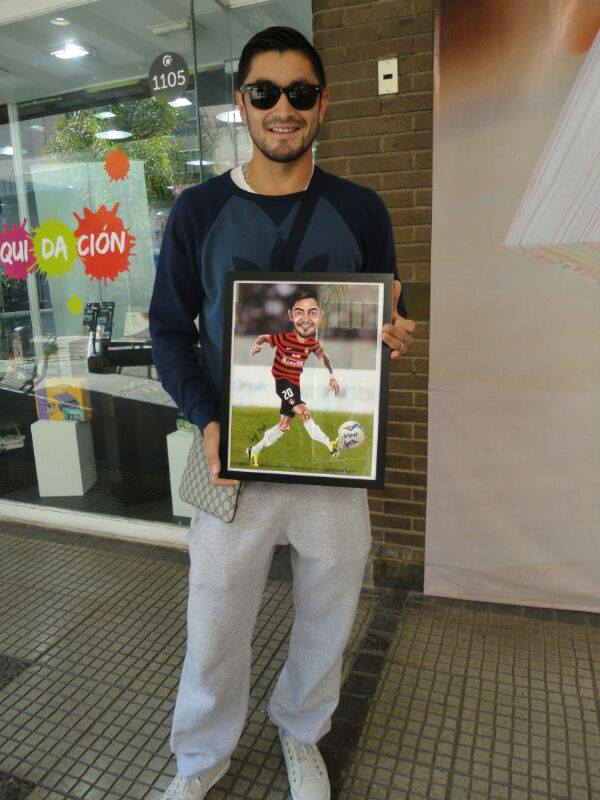

Personal information
- Full name: Rodrigo Javier Millar Carvajal
- Date of birth: 3 November 1981 (age 45)
- Place of birth: Arauco, Chile
- Height: 1.83 m (6 ft 0 in)
- Position: Midfielder

Youth career
- 1994–1998: Huachipato

Senior career*
Years	Team	Apps	(Gls)
1999–2006	Huachipato	190	(56)
2007–2012	Colo-Colo	164	(23)
2008	→ Once Caldas (loan)	10	(3)
2013–2015	Atlas	77	(12)
2015–2018	→ Morelia (loan)	80	(4)
2018–2020	Morelia	57	(2)
2020–2021	Mazatlán	14	(0)
2021	Coquimbo Unido	5	(0)
Total		597	(100)

International career
2001	Chile U20	2	(1)
2002–2016	Chile	37	(3)
- * Club domestic league appearances and goals

Rodrigo Javier Millar Carvajal (born 3 November 1981) is a Chilean former footballer who played as a midfielder. He played for Chile in the 2010 FIFA World Cup. He also holds Mexican citizenship.

== Club career ==
=== Huachipato ===
Millar started his career at Huachipato in 1999. He made his Chilean Primera División debut, aged 20, against Santiago Wanderers on 30 April 2000. Millar scored his first goal for Huachipato against Rangers de Talca in a 1–1 draw. In the 2003 season, Millar scored 12 goals in 32 games and caught the eye of several European teams.

On 6 March 2004, it was reported that Millar was invited to train with the German side Hertha BSC. After training with the club, it was revealed that they wanted to sign him due to his good performances for Huachipato and his nomination for the 2004 Copa América in Peru. However, his move to Germany failed to materialise and he remained with Huachipato where his performance improved considerably, scoring 14 goals in 39 games.

In July 2006, after a very good Torneo de Apertura, Millar was nearly transferred to CD Tenerife and was also linked with FC Terek Grozny, but later rejected the offer for personal reasons. Millar then had a poor Torneo de Clausura performance because of a series of injuries, scoring only 3 goals in 8 games.

=== Colo-Colo ===
On 14 December 2006, it was reported that Millar had come to an agreement with Colo-Colo. He signed a three-year deal, which was officially announced on 16 December. He joined the club in February 2007, but suffered a training injury that prevented him from playing for three months.

Once he recovered, he made his debut on 20 March 2007 against the Venezuelan side Caracas FC at the Copa Libertadores and scored his club's first goal in a 4–0 win over LDU Quito. In his league debut against O'Higgins, he scored twice, and was voted man of the match.

After a good start to the season, his form declined due to off field problems, and he ended up being relegated to the substitutes bench. At the end of the season, Millar was nearly transferred to the Israeli club Ashdod, but the transfer fell through. He attempted to return to Chile, but was shunned by Colo-Colo's coach Claudio Borghi and shortly after loaned to Once Caldas.

After his loan with Once Caldas had finished, he returned to Colo-Colo in June 2008, despite Fernando Astengo not planning on featuring him in the team,. Millar made his first start against Universidad de Chile in a Copa Gato match that ended in a 2–1 victory at Tierra de Campeones Stadium in Iquique. Despite several starts, he found it difficult to break into the first team, with Astengo preferring to use him as a substitute.. With the arrival of Marcelo Barticciotto as coach, he was given a more permanent position in the first team, providing consistently good performances as a result. On 8 November 2008, Millar scored his first goal in the Barticciotto era against Cobresal in a 1–1 home draw. In the Championship playoffs second leg final, Millar was proclaimed a champion for third time in his career, after he scored the goal of the championship in the 3–1 victory against Palestino, by eluding the goalkeeper Felipe Núñez and playing masterfully.

On 14 February 2009, Millar scored his first goal of the season in an Apertura tournament match that ended in a 2–0 victory over Universidad de Concepción at Estadio Monumental, where he scored the first goal of the game. On 22 April, he scored a goal in a Copa Libertadores match that ended in a 2–1 loss against Sport Recife in Brazil. He also scored the first goal at Colo-Colo's 5–2 win over Cobresal. At the end of season, Millar become the first footballer to contract swine flu on 16 June. He made a full recovery for the start of the Torneo Clausura.

During the 2010 season he performed consistently well with Colo-Colo, and was selected for Chile's FIFA World Cup 2010 team and voted the Chilean Footballer of the Year in the Anfp awards. His club lost the championship, finishing three points behindUniversidad Católica. Millar was approached by Toluca who were impressed by his consistently good performances. However he never moved to Mexico and remained in Chile.

In the 2011 season Millar was promoted to captain, due to the departure of Arturo Sanhueza to Deportes Iquique, but was stripped of the captaincy because of the departure of coach Diego Cagna and the arrival of Américo Gallego.

=== Atlas ===
In 2013, he was signed by Club Atlas, he debuted with Atlas in the 0–1 away defeat vs Tigres UANL. He scored his first goal in a 2–1 home victory over Club América. Prior to the start of the 2014 Torneo Apertura, Millar was announced as the new captain of Atlas. In December 2014, he renewed his contract for two years.

=== Coquimbo Unido ===
In September 2021, he returned to Chile after being released from Mazatlán and joined Coquimbo Unido in the Primera B de Chile.

=== Retirement ===
He retired at the end of the 2021 season.

== International career ==
His performances for Colo-Colo earned Millar a place in the national team in September 2009 for a friendly match against Honduras. He went on to be a part of Chile's squad for the 2010 FIFA World Cup, where he scored Chile's goal in the 1–2 defeat to Spain in the first round. Millar was named in the 2011 Copa América squad but did not play. Jorge Sampaoli named him in the 30-man provisional squad for the 2014 FIFA World Cup. After not being included in the 23-man World Cup squad, Millar returned to play for Chile in friendlies against Mexico and Haiti. During a friendly against Venezuela, Millar scored his first international goal in 4 years in an eventual 5–0 victory.

He was named in the preliminary squad for the 2015 Copa America but was omitted from the final squad.

=== International goals ===
Date	Venue	Opponent	Score	Result	Competition
5 September 2009	Estadio Monumental David Arellano, Santiago, Chile	Venezuela	2–2	2–2	2010 FIFA World Cup qualification
25 June 2010	Loftus Versfeld Stadium, Pretoria, South Africa	Spain	1–2	1–2	2010 FIFA World Cup
14 November 2014	Estadio CAP, Talcahuano, Chile	Venezuela	4–0	5–0	Friendly

== Honours ==
=== Club ===
Colo-Colo

- Primera División de Chile (4): 2007 Apertura, 2007 Clausura, 2008 Clausura, 2009 Clausura

Coquimbo Unido

- Primera B (1): 2021

=== Individual ===
- Primera División Team of The Tournament (2): 2009, 2010
- Chilean Footballer of the Year: 2010
- Medalla Bicentenario: 2010
