= 2010 FIFA World Cup Group H =

Football tournament group stage

Group H of the 2010 FIFA World Cup began on 16 June and ended on 25 June 2010. The group consisted of Switzerland, Honduras, Chile and reigning European (and eventual) champions Spain.

Chile and Spain were in the same group in 1950, in a group from which only the Spanish team qualified for the next round. Chile and Switzerland were also in the same group in 1962, when Chile was host and went on to finish in third place. Switzerland and Spain competed in the same group in 1966, but neither advanced to the next round. Finally, Honduras and Spain were in the same group in 1982. Four years later, in the next World Cup, Chile and Spain would meet again in Group B, against the Netherlands and Australia; Chile would upset Spain 2–0 in their second match, eliminating Spain from the tournament.

== Standings ==
Pos	Team	Pld	W	D	L	GF	GA	GD	Pts	Qualification
1	Spain	3	2	0	1	4	2	+2	6	Advance to knockout stage
2	Chile	3	2	0	1	3	2	+1	6	Advance to knockout stage
3	Switzerland	3	1	1	1	1	1	0	4	
4	Honduras	3	0	1	2	0	3	−3	1	

Source: FIFA
Rules for classification: Tie-breaking criteria
- Spain advanced to play Portugal (runner-up of Group G) in the round of 16.
- Chile advanced to play Brazil (winner of Group G) in the round of 16.
- Switzerland would wind up being the first team since Norway in 1994 to defeat the eventual group winner in their opening match but fail to advance to the second round.

== Matches ==
All times local (UTC+2)

=== Honduras vs Chile ===
16 June 2010
13:30

Honduras	0–1	Chile
		Beausejour 34'

Mbombela Stadium, Nelspruit
Attendance: 32,664
Referee: Eddy Maillet (Seychelles)

Honduras	Chile

GK	18	Noel Valladares
RB	23	Sergio Mendoza
CB	2	Osman Chávez
CB	3	Maynor Figueroa
LB	21	Emilio Izaguirre
CM	8	Wilson Palacios	(yellow card) 33'
CM	20	Amado Guevara (c)		(substituted off) 66'
RW	17	Edgar Álvarez
AM	7	Ramón Núñez		(substituted off) 78'
LW	13	Roger Espinoza
CF	9	Carlos Pavón		(substituted off) 60'
Substitutions:
FW	12	Georgie Welcome		(substituted on) 60'
MF	6	Hendry Thomas		(substituted on) 66'
FW	15	Walter Martínez		(substituted on) 78'
Manager:
(Colombia) Alexis Mendoza (Note: Due to a one-match suspension of manager Reinaldo Rueda, assistant manager Alexis Mendoza took his place on the bench.)

GK	1	Claudio Bravo (c)
RB	4	Mauricio Isla
CB	17	Gary Medel
CB	3	Waldo Ponce
LB	8	Arturo Vidal		(substituted off) 81'
RM	20	Rodrigo Millar		(substituted off) 52'
CM	6	Carlos Carmona	(yellow card) 4'
LM	14	Matías Fernández	(yellow card) 19'
AM	10	Jorge Valdivia		(substituted off) 87'
CF	7	Alexis Sánchez
CF	15	Jean Beausejour
Substitutions:
DF	18	Gonzalo Jara		(substituted on) 52'
DF	5	Pablo Contreras		(substituted on) 81'
FW	11	Mark González		(substituted on) 87'
Manager:
(Argentina) Marcelo Bielsa

Man of the Match:
Jean Beausejour (Chile)

Assistant referees:
Evarist Menkouande (Cameroon)
Bechir Hassani (Tunisia)
Fourth official:
Yuichi Nishimura (Japan)
Fifth official:
Toru Sagara (Japan)

=== Spain vs Switzerland ===
16 June 2010
16:00

Spain	0–1	Switzerland
		Fernandes 52'

Moses Mabhida Stadium, Durban
Attendance: 62,453
Referee: Howard Webb (England)

Spain	Switzerland

GK	1	Iker Casillas (c)
RB	15	Sergio Ramos
CB	5	Carles Puyol
CB	3	Gerard Piqué
LB	11	Joan Capdevila
DM	16	Sergio Busquets	(substituted off) 61'
CM	14	Xabi Alonso
CM	8	Xavi
RW	21	David Silva	(substituted off) 62'
LW	6	Andrés Iniesta	(substituted off) 77'
CF	7	David Villa
Substitutions:
FW	9	Fernando Torres	(substituted on) 61'
MF	22	Jesús Navas	(substituted on) 62'
FW	18	Pedro	(substituted on) 77'
Manager:
Vicente del Bosque

GK	1	Diego Benaglio	(yellow card) 90+1'
RB	2	Stephan Lichtsteiner
CB	4	Philippe Senderos		(substituted off) 35'
CB	13	Stéphane Grichting	(yellow card) 30'
LB	17	Reto Ziegler	(yellow card) 73'
RM	7	Tranquillo Barnetta		(substituted off) 90+2'
CM	8	Gökhan Inler (c)
CM	6	Benjamin Huggel
LM	16	Gelson Fernandes
SS	19	Eren Derdiyok		(substituted off) 79'
CF	10	Blaise Nkufo
Substitutions:
DF	5	Steve von Bergen		(substituted on) 35'
MF	15	Hakan Yakin	(yellow card) 90+4'	(substituted on) 79'
DF	22	Mario Eggimann		(substituted on) 90+2'
Manager:
(Germany) Ottmar Hitzfeld

Man of the Match:
Gelson Fernandes (Switzerland)

Assistant referees:
Darren Cann (England)
Michael Mullarkey (England)
Fourth official:
Martin Hansson (Sweden)
Fifth official:
Stefan Wittberg (Sweden)

=== Chile vs Switzerland ===
21 June 2010
16:00

Chile	1–0	Switzerland
González 75'

Nelson Mandela Bay Stadium, Port Elizabeth
Attendance: 34,872
Referee: Khalil Al Ghamdi (Saudi Arabia)

Chile	Switzerland

GK	1	Claudio Bravo (c)
RB	4	Mauricio Isla
CB	17	Gary Medel	(yellow card) 61'
CB	3	Waldo Ponce	(yellow card) 25'
LB	18	Gonzalo Jara
RM	8	Arturo Vidal		(substituted off) 46'
CM	6	Carlos Carmona	(yellow card) 22'
LM	14	Matías Fernández	(yellow card) 60'	(substituted off) 65'
RF	7	Alexis Sánchez
CF	9	Humberto Suazo	(yellow card) 2'	(substituted off) 46'
LF	15	Jean Beausejour
Substitutions:
MF	10	Jorge Valdivia	(yellow card) 90+2'	(substituted on) 46'
MF	11	Mark González		(substituted on) 46'
FW	22	Esteban Paredes		(substituted on) 65'
Manager:
(Argentina) Marcelo Bielsa

GK	1	Diego Benaglio
RB	2	Stephan Lichtsteiner
CB	5	Steve von Bergen
CB	13	Stéphane Grichting
LB	17	Reto Ziegler
RM	11	Valon Behrami	(red card) 31'
CM	8	Gökhan Inler	(yellow card) 60'
CM	6	Benjamin Huggel
LM	16	Gelson Fernandes		(substituted off) 77'
SS	9	Alexander Frei (c)		(substituted off) 42'
CF	10	Blaise Nkufo	(yellow card) 18'	(substituted off) 68'
Substitutions:
MF	7	Tranquillo Barnetta	(yellow card) 48'	(substituted on) 42'
FW	19	Eren Derdiyok		(substituted on) 68'
FW	18	Albert Bunjaku		(substituted on) 77'
Manager:
(Germany) Ottmar Hitzfeld

Man of the Match:
Mark González (Chile)

Assistant referees:
Hassan Kamranifar (Iran)
Saleh Al Marzouqi (United Arab Emirates)
Fourth official:
Martín Vázquez (Uruguay)
Fifth official:
Miguel Nievas (Uruguay)

=== Spain vs Honduras ===
21 June 2010
20:30

Spain	2–0	Honduras
Villa 17', 51'

Ellis Park Stadium, Johannesburg
Attendance: 54,386
Referee: Yuichi Nishimura (Japan)

Spain	Honduras

GK	1	Iker Casillas (c)
RB	15	Sergio Ramos	(substituted off) 77'
CB	5	Carles Puyol
CB	3	Gerard Piqué
LB	11	Joan Capdevila
DM	16	Sergio Busquets
RM	22	Jesús Navas
LM	14	Xabi Alonso
AM	8	Xavi	(substituted off) 66'
CF	9	Fernando Torres	(substituted off) 70'
CF	7	David Villa
Substitutions:
MF	10	Cesc Fàbregas	(substituted on) 66'
MF	13	Juan Mata	(substituted on) 70'
DF	17	Álvaro Arbeloa	(substituted on) 77'
Manager:
Vicente del Bosque

GK	18	Noel Valladares
RB	23	Sergio Mendoza
CB	2	Osman Chávez
CB	3	Maynor Figueroa
LB	21	Emilio Izaguirre	(yellow card) 38'
CM	8	Wilson Palacios
CM	20	Amado Guevara (c)
RW	19	Danilo Turcios	(yellow card) 8'	(substituted off) 63'
AM	15	Walter Martínez
LW	13	Roger Espinoza		(substituted off) 46'
CF	11	David Suazo		(substituted off) 84'
Substitutions:
FW	12	Georgie Welcome		(substituted on) 46'
MF	7	Ramón Núñez		(substituted on) 63'
FW	10	Jerry Palacios		(substituted on) 84'
Manager:
(Colombia) Reinaldo Rueda

Man of the Match:
David Villa (Spain)

Assistant referees:
Toru Sagara (Japan)
Jeong Hae-sang (South Korea)
Fourth official:
Subkhiddin Mohd Salleh (Malaysia)
Fifth official:
Jeffrey Goh Gek Pheng (Singapore)

=== Chile vs Spain ===
25 June 2010
20:30

Chile	1–2	Spain
Millar 47'		Villa 24'; Iniesta 37'

Loftus Versfeld Stadium, Pretoria
Attendance: 41,958
Referee: Marco Rodríguez (Mexico)

Chile	Spain

GK	1	Claudio Bravo (c)
RB	4	Mauricio Isla
CB	17	Gary Medel	(yellow card) 15'
CB	3	Waldo Ponce	(yellow card) 19'
LB	18	Gonzalo Jara
RM	8	Arturo Vidal
CM	13	Marco Estrada	(yellow card) 21' (yellow-red card) 37'
LM	11	Mark González		(substituted off) 46'
AM	10	Jorge Valdivia		(substituted off) 46'
CF	7	Alexis Sánchez		(substituted off) 65'
CF	15	Jean Beausejour
Substitutions:
MF	20	Rodrigo Millar		(substituted on) 46'
FW	22	Esteban Paredes		(substituted on) 46'
FW	16	Fabián Orellana		(substituted on) 65'
Manager:
(Argentina) Marcelo Bielsa

GK	1	Iker Casillas (c)
RB	15	Sergio Ramos
CB	3	Gerard Piqué
CB	5	Carles Puyol
LB	11	Joan Capdevila
DM	16	Sergio Busquets
RM	8	Xavi
LM	14	Xabi Alonso	(substituted off) 73'
RW	6	Andrés Iniesta
LW	7	David Villa
CF	9	Fernando Torres	(substituted off) 55'
Substitutions:
MF	10	Cesc Fàbregas	(substituted on) 55'
MF	20	Javi Martínez	(substituted on) 73'
Manager:
Vicente del Bosque

Man of the Match:
Andrés Iniesta (Spain)

Assistant referees:
José Luis Camargo (Mexico)
Alberto Morín Méndez (Mexico)
Fourth official:
Subkhiddin Mohd Salleh (Malaysia)
Fifth official:
Mu Yuxin (China)

=== Switzerland vs Honduras ===
25 June 2010
20:30

Switzerland	0–0	Honduras

Free State Stadium, Bloemfontein
Attendance: 28,042
Referee: Héctor Baldassi (Argentina)

Switzerland	Honduras

GK	1	Diego Benaglio
RB	2	Stephan Lichtsteiner
CB	5	Steve von Bergen
CB	13	Stéphane Grichting
LB	17	Reto Ziegler
RM	7	Tranquillo Barnetta
CM	6	Benjamin Huggel		(substituted off) 78'
CM	8	Gökhan Inler (c)
LM	16	Gelson Fernandes	(yellow card) 34'	(substituted off) 46'
CF	19	Eren Derdiyok
CF	10	Blaise Nkufo		(substituted off) 69'
Substitutions:
MF	15	Hakan Yakin		(substituted on) 46'
FW	9	Alexander Frei		(substituted on) 69'
MF	23	Xherdan Shaqiri		(substituted on) 78'
Manager:
(Germany) Ottmar Hitzfeld

GK	18	Noel Valladares (c)
RB	16	Mauricio Sabillón
CB	2	Osman Chávez	(yellow card) 64'
CB	5	Víctor Bernárdez
LB	3	Maynor Figueroa
CM	8	Wilson Palacios	(yellow card) 89'
CM	6	Hendry Thomas	(yellow card) 4'
RW	17	Edgar Álvarez
LW	7	Ramón Núñez		(substituted off) 67'
CF	10	Jerry Palacios		(substituted off) 78'
CF	11	David Suazo	(yellow card) 58'	(substituted off) 87'
Substitutions:
FW	15	Walter Martínez		(substituted on) 67'
FW	12	Georgie Welcome		(substituted on) 78'
MF	19	Danilo Turcios		(substituted on) 87'
Manager:
(Colombia) Reinaldo Rueda

Man of the Match:
Noel Valladares (Honduras)

Assistant referees:
Ricardo Casas (Argentina)
Hernan Maidana (Argentina)
Fourth official:
Olegário Benquerença (Portugal)
Fifth official:
Jose Manuel Silva Cardinal (Portugal)

== See also ==
- Chile at the FIFA World Cup
- Honduras at the FIFA World Cup
- Spain at the FIFA World Cup
- Switzerland at the FIFA World Cup
