= 2010 FIFA World Cup officials =

Officials for the 2010 FIFA World Cup are selected from a pool of 30 trios of referees and assistant referees announced by the association football governing body, FIFA, on 5 February 2010. The final cut was selected from a group of 38 referees revealed in October 2008, themselves whittled down from an initial group of 54 selected for the Refereeing Assistance Programme in 2007. From the quarter-finals onwards, the pool of referees was reduced to 19.

== Selection process ==
In 2007, the FIFA Executive Committee set up the Refereeing Assistance Programme (RAP) to help prepare the referees in contention to officiate at the 2010 World Cup; 54 were selected to make up the initial group. Over the following months, they were assessed based on their performances at FIFA tournaments, RAP seminars and in their domestic leagues. In September 2008, 53 of the original 54 referees attended an "Elite Referee" seminar in Zürich, Switzerland, where their technical, physical and mental abilities were analysed. The results were presented to the FIFA Referees' Committee, who preselected 38 trios of referees and their assistants on 22 October.

From this group of 38, ten trios – representing all six confederations – were selected to referee at the 2009 FIFA Confederations Cup, hosted by South Africa as preparation for the World Cup 12 months later. This assignment was viewed by FIFA as part of the referees' assessment, to ensure that they are prepared for the technical and physical demands of the World Cup in South Africa.

The final 30 trios of officials were announced at a meeting of the FIFA Referees Committee in Zürich on 5 February 2010. The trios were assessed using the same criteria as for the original cut. Following their selection, each official underwent FIFA's pre-competition medical assessment (PCMA) at the Schulthess Clinic in Zürich between 25 February and 6 March.

However, on 27 May 2010, two referees – Carlos Amarilla and Mohamed Benouza – and their assistants were removed from the final list, following the assistant referees' failure in the standard fitness tests, the same tests as those held in Zurich. Uruguayan referee Martín Vázquez and his assistant referees were called up as a replacement trio.

For the quarter-finals onwards, FIFA trimmed their list of match officials, allowing 10 teams of referees to return home. The teams sent home were those of Roberto Rosetti (Italy), Jorge Larrionda (Uruguay), Stéphane Lannoy (France), Massimo Busacca (Switzerland), Martin Hansson (Sweden), Koman Coulibaly (Mali), Subkhiddin Mohd Salleh (Malaysia), Peter O'Leary (New Zealand), Martín Vázquez (Uruguay) and Joel Aguilar (El Salvador).

== Officials ==
Confederation	Referee	Assistants	Matches assigned	Fourth official
AFC	Yuichi Nishimura (Japan)	Toru Sagara (Japan); Jeong Hae-sang (South Korea)	Uruguay–France (Group A); Paraguay–New Zealand (Group F); Spain–Honduras (Group H); Netherlands–Brazil (Quarter-finals)	Honduras–Chile (Group H); Uruguay–Netherlands (Semi-finals); Netherlands–Spain (Final)
AFC	Subkhiddin Mohd Salleh (Malaysia)	Mu Yuxin (China); Jeffrey Goh Gek Pheng (Singapore)		South Africa–Mexico (Group A); Slovenia–United States (Group C); United States–Algeria (Group C); Serbia–Ghana (Group D); Brazil–North Korea (Group G); Brazil–Ivory Coast (Group G); Spain–Honduras (Group H); Chile–Spain (Group H)
AFC	Khalil Al Ghamdi (Saudi Arabia)	Hassan Kamranifar (Iran); Saleh Al Marzouqi (United Arab Emirates)	France–Mexico (Group A); Chile–Switzerland (Group H)	Argentina–Nigeria (Group B); Cameroon–Netherlands (Group E); Netherlands–Brazil (Quarter-finals)
AFC	Ravshan Irmatov (Uzbekistan)	Rafael Ilyasov (Uzbekistan); Bakhadyr Kochkarov (Kyrgyzstan)	South Africa–Mexico (Group A); Greece–Argentina (Group B); England–Algeria (Group C); Argentina–Germany (Quarter-finals); Uruguay–Netherlands (Semi-finals)	New Zealand–Slovakia (Group F)
CAF	Koman Coulibaly (Mali)	Inácio Cândido (Angola); Redouane Achik (Morocco)	Slovenia–United States (Group C)	Italy–New Zealand (Group F); Paraguay–New Zealand (Group F)
CAF	Eddy Maillet (Seychelles)	Bechir Hassani (Tunisia); Evarist Menkouande (Cameroon)	Slovakia–Paraguay (Group F); Honduras–Chile (Group H)	England–United States (Group C)
CAF	Jerome Damon (South Africa)	Enock Molefe (South Africa); Célestin Ntagungira (Rwanda)	Denmark–Japan (Group E); New Zealand–Slovakia (Group F)	Argentina–South Korea (Group B); Portugal–North Korea (Group G); Argentina–Mexico (Round of 16); Argentina–Germany (Quarter-finals)
CONCACAF	Joel Aguilar (El Salvador)	William Torres (El Salvador); Juan Zumba (El Salvador)		Uruguay–France (Group A); Greece–Nigeria (Group B); Slovenia–England (Group C); Italy–Paraguay (Group F); Slovakia–Paraguay (Group F); Uruguay–South Korea (Round of 16)
CONCACAF	Carlos Batres (Guatemala)	Leonel Leal (Costa Rica); Carlos Pastrana (Honduras)	Algeria–Slovenia (Group C); Italy–New Zealand (Group F); Paraguay–Spain (Quarter-finals)	Australia–Serbia (Group D); Spain–Portugal (Round of 16)
CONCACAF	Benito Archundia (Mexico)	Marvin Torrentera (Mexico); Héctor Vergara (Canada)	Italy–Paraguay (Group F); Portugal–Brazil (Group G); Uruguay–Germany (Match for third place)	Paraguay–Spain (Quarter-finals
CONCACAF	Marco Rodríguez (Mexico)	José Luis Camargo (Mexico); Alberto Morín (Mexico)	Germany–Australia (Group D); Chile–Spain (Group H)	Nigeria–South Korea (Group B); Uruguay–Germany (Match for third place)
CONMEBOL	Héctor Baldassi (Argentina)	Ricardo Casas (Argentina); Hernán Maidana (Argentina)	Serbia–Ghana (Group D); Netherlands–Japan (Group E); Switzerland–Honduras (Group H); Spain–Portugal (Round of 16)	France–South Africa (Group A)
CONMEBOL	Carlos Eugênio Simon (Brazil)	Altemir Hausmann (Brazil); Roberto Braatz (Brazil)	England–United States (Group C); Ghana–Germany (Group D)	Ghana–Australia (Group D)
CONMEBOL	Pablo Pozo (Chile)	Patricio Basualto (Chile); Francisco Mondria (Chile)	Cameroon–Netherlands (Group E); Portugal–North Korea (Group G)	
CONMEBOL	Óscar Ruiz (Colombia)	Abraham González (Colombia); Humberto Clavijo (Colombia)	France–South Africa (Group A); Greece–Nigeria (Group B)	Japan–Cameroon (Group E)
CONMEBOL	Jorge Larrionda (Uruguay)	Pablo Fandiño (Uruguay); Mauricio Espinosa (Uruguay)	Australia–Serbia (Group D); Cameroon–Denmark (Group E); Ivory Coast–Portugal (Group G); Germany–England (Round of 16)	
CONMEBOL	Martín Vázquez (Uruguay)	Carlos Pastorino (Uruguay); Miguel Nievas (Uruguay)		South Korea–Greece (Group B); Germany–Serbia (Group D); Ghana–Germany (Group D); Ivory Coast–Portugal (Group G); Chile–Switzerland (Group H); Germany–England (Round of 16)
OFC	Michael Hester (New Zealand)	Jan-Hendrik Hintz (New Zealand); Tevita Makasini (Tonga)	South Korea–Greece (Group B)	England–Algeria (Group C); United States–Ghana (Round of 16)
OFC	Peter O'Leary (New Zealand)	Brent Best (New Zealand); Matthew Taro (Solomon Islands)		France–Mexico (Group A); Greece–Argentina (Group B); Algeria–Slovenia (Group C); Cameroon–Denmark (Group E); Portugal–Brazil (Group G); Paraguay–Japan (Round of 16)
UEFA	Frank De Bleeckere (Belgium)	Peter Hermans (Belgium); Walter Vromans (Belgium)	Argentina–South Korea (Group B); United States–Algeria (Group C); Paraguay–Japan (Round of 16)	Germany–Spain (Semi-finals)
UEFA	Howard Webb (England)	Darren Cann (England); Michael Mullarkey (England)	Slovakia–Italy (Group F); Spain–Switzerland (Group H); Brazil–Chile (Round of 16); Netherlands–Spain (Final)	
UEFA	Stéphane Lannoy (France)	Éric Dansault (France); Laurent Ugo (France)	Netherlands–Denmark (Group E); Brazil–Ivory Coast (Group G)	Slovakia–Italy (Group F); Netherlands–Slovakia (Round of 16)
UEFA	Wolfgang Stark (Germany)	Jan-Hendrik Salver (Germany); Mike Pickel (Germany)	Argentina–Nigeria (Group B); Slovenia–England (Group C); Uruguay–South Korea (Round of 16)	South Africa–Uruguay (Group A)
UEFA	Viktor Kassai (Hungary)	Gábor Erős (Hungary); Tibor Vámos (Hungary)	Mexico–Uruguay (Group A); Brazil–North Korea (Group G); United States–Ghana (Round of 16); Germany–Spain (Semi-finals)	
UEFA	Roberto Rosetti (Italy)	Paolo Calcagno (Italy); Stefano Ayroldi (Italy)	Ghana–Australia (Group D); Argentina–Mexico (Round of 16)	Netherlands–Denmark (Group E)
UEFA	Olegário Benquerença (Portugal)	José Cardinal (Portugal); Bertino Miranda (Portugal)	Nigeria–South Korea (Group B); Japan–Cameroon (Group E); Uruguay–Ghana (Quarter-finals)	Switzerland–Honduras (Group H)
UEFA	Alberto Undiano Mallenco (Spain)	Fermín Martínez Ibáñez (Spain); Juan Carlos Yuste Jiménez (Spain)	Germany–Serbia (Group D); North Korea–Ivory Coast (Group G); Netherlands–Slovakia (Round of 16)	Uruguay–Ghana (Quarter-finals)
UEFA	Martin Hansson (Sweden)	Henrik Andrén (Sweden); Stefan Wittberg (Sweden)		Mexico–Uruguay (Group A); Germany–Australia (Group D); Netherlands–Japan (Group E); Denmark–Japan (Group E); Spain–Switzerland (Group H); Brazil–Chile (Round of 16)
UEFA	Massimo Busacca (Switzerland)	Francesco Buragina (Switzerland); Matthias Arnet (Switzerland)	South Africa–Uruguay (Group A)	North Korea–Ivory Coast (Group G)
