= 2006 FIFA World Cup officials =

Match officials for the 2006 FIFA World Cup were nominated by the six confederations to FIFA, who, after a series of tests in Frankfurt/Neu-Isenburg in March 2006, selected 23 referees and a support and development group of a further 5, from a shortlist of 44.

Kyros Vassaras of Greece and Manuel Mejuto of Spain were selected to be on the panel, but the assistants who were to make up their teams were not deemed to have reached the required standards, and so they were replaced by Roberto Rosetti and Luis Medina. Jamaican referee Peter Prendergast was selected for the tournament panel, but suffered a knee injury and was removed from the list without replacement. Massimo De Santis of Italy was also on the panel of 23 referees, but after he was implicated in the Serie A match-fixing allegations, he was withdrawn by the Italian Football Federation and not replaced.

The 21 referees, along with their assistants and the support group, are based in Neu-Isenburg for the duration of the tournament. FIFA announces the referees selected for each fixture three days in advance of the match.

Horacio Elizondo was chosen to officiate the final match, which took place in Berlin on July 9.

== Refereeing teams ==
Below are the details of the 21 groups of match officials in the 2006 FIFA World Cup. For assistants, a flag is only shown if his nationality varies from that of the referee with whom he is grouped.

Most teams (consisting of a referee and two assistants) are drawn from the same nation, and all are made up of officials from the same confederation. In the first round of the tournament, officials other than from UEFA member associations only operate in groups that do not include a representative of their confederation.

Mexico is the only country with 2 referees on the panel.

For the first time at a World Cup, match officials will be equipped with microphones and earpieces so they can communicate better with each other during each game. Furthermore this World Cup sees the introduction of a fifth official who can be called upon to replace an injured assistant referee. The fourth official would replace the referee..

Referee	Assistants	Matches	Red cards	Yellow cards
(Egypt) Essam Abd El Fatah	D. Dante (Mali); M. Ndoye (Senegal)	Group F: Australia vs. Japan	0	7
(Paraguay) Carlos Amarilla	A. Andino; M. Bernal	Group E: United States vs Czech Republic; Group G: Togo vs Switzerland; Group H: Tunisia vs Ukraine	1	18
(Mexico) Benito Archundia	J. Ramirez; H. Vergara (Canada)	Group F: Brazil vs Croatia; Group G: France vs South Korea; Group E: Czech Republic vs Italy; Round 2: Switzerland vs Ukraine; Semi-final: Germany vs Italy	1	14
(Switzerland) Massimo Busacca	F. Buragina; M. Arnet	Group H: Spain vs Ukraine; Group B: Sweden vs England; Round 2: Argentina vs Mexico	1	11
(Benin) Coffi Codjia	C. Ntagungira (Rwanda); A. Aderodjou	Group A: Ecuador vs Costa Rica; Group H: Spain vs Saudi Arabia	0	10
(Belgium) Frank De Bleeckere	P. Hermans; W. Vromans	Group C: Argentina vs Ivory Coast; Group F: Croatia vs Japan; Round 2: England vs Ecuador; Quarter-final: Italy vs Ukraine	0	19
(Argentina) Horacio Elizondo	D. Garcia; R. Otero	Group A: Germany vs Costa Rica; Group E: Czech Republic vs Ghana; Group G: South Korea vs Switzerland; Quarter-final: England vs Portugal; Final: Italy vs France	3	24
(Russia) Valentin Ivanov	N. Golubev; E. Volnin	Group G: France vs Switzerland; Group A: Ecuador vs Germany; Round 2: Portugal vs Netherlands	4	26
(Japan) Toru Kamikawa	Y. Hiroshima; Kim Dae Young (South Korea)	Group A: Poland vs Ecuador; Group B: England vs Trinidad and Tobago; Match for third place: Germany vs Portugal	0	14
(Uruguay) Jorge Larrionda	W. Rial; P. Fandino	Group D: Angola vs Portugal; Group E: Italy vs United States; Group G: Togo vs France; Semi-final: Portugal vs France	3	15
(Singapore) Shamsul Maidin	P. Permpanich (Thailand); E. Ghuloum (United Arab Emirates)	Group B: Trinidad and Tobago vs Sweden; Group D: Mexico vs Angola; Group A: Costa Rica vs Poland	2	20
(Spain) Luis Medina Cantalejo	V. Giraldez; P. Medina	Group A: Germany vs Poland; Group C: Netherlands vs Argentina; Round 2: Italy vs Australia; Quarter-final: Brazil vs France	2	25
(Germany) Markus Merk	C. Schraer; J.-H. Salver	Group C: Serbia and Montenegro vs Netherlands; Group F: Brazil vs Australia; Group E: Ghana vs United States	0	16
(Slovakia) Ľuboš Micheľ	R. Slysko; M. Balko	Group B: Sweden vs Paraguay; Group D: Portugal vs Mexico; Round 2: Brazil vs Ghana; Quarter-final: Germany vs Argentina	3	32
(England) Graham Poll	P. Sharp; G. Turner	Group G: South Korea vs Togo; Group H: Saudi Arabia vs Ukraine; Group F: Croatia vs Australia	4	20
(France) Eric Poulat	L. Dagorne; V. Texier	Group D: Portugal vs Iran; Group F: Japan vs Brazil	0	9
(Mexico) Marco Rodríguez	J. Camargo; L. Leal (Costa Rica)	Group B: England vs Paraguay; Group C: Ivory Coast vs Serbia and Montenegro	2	12
(Italy) Roberto Rosetti	C. Copelli; A. Stagnoli	Group D: Mexico vs Iran; Group C: Argentina vs Serbia and Montenegro; Group B: Paraguay vs Trinidad and Tobago; Round 2: Spain vs France	1	15
(Colombia) Oscar Ruiz	F. Tamayo (Ecuador); J. Navia	Group C: Netherlands vs Ivory Coast	0	7
(Australia) Mark Shield	N. Gibson; B. Wilson	Group H: Tunisia vs Saudi Arabia; Group D: Iran vs Angola	0	10
(Brazil) Carlos Simon	A. Tavares; E. Corona	Group E: Italy vs Ghana; Group H: Spain vs Tunisia; Round 2: Germany vs Sweden	1	18

== Support officials ==
Five teams of officials were named to be on standby in the case of injury to any of the officials nominated for a match. None of them were called upon, however, and from the quarter-finals onwards, referees from among the 12 retained for the latter stages of the tournament were given standby appointments to matches.

Referee	Assistant
(Saudi Arabia) Khalil Al Ghamdi	H. Al Kadri (Syria); F. Rabati (Jordan)
(Chile) Carlos Chandia	C. Julio; R. Gonzalez
(South Africa) Jerome Damon	E. Molefe; J. Yeboah (Ghana)
(Morocco) Mohamed Guezzaz	B. Djezzar (Algeria); J. Endeng Zogo (Cameroon)
(United States) Kevin Stott	C. Strickland (United States); G. Barkey (United States)

== Final Match Officials ==
On Wednesday 28 June, one day after the Second Round matches were completed and two days before the quarter-finals, the FIFA announced the 12 referees that were retained for the remaining matches. This is the standard process, meant to ensure only the best referees are in charge of the final few games. The twelve are:

- Toru Kamikawa (Japan)
- Coffi Codjia (Benin)
- Benito Archundia (Mexico)
- Horacio Elizondo (Argentina)
- Jorge Larrionda (Uruguay)
- Mark Shield (Australia)
- Massimo Busacca (Switzerland)
- Frank De Bleeckere (Belgium)
- Luis Medina Cantalejo (Spain)
- Markus Merk (Germany)
- Ľuboš Micheľ (Slovakia)
- Roberto Rosetti (Italy)

== See also ==
- 2006 FIFA World Cup disciplinary record
- 2010 FIFA World Cup officials
