= 2010 FIFA World Cup knockout stage =

The knockout stage of the 2010 FIFA World Cup was the second and final stage of the World Cup, following the group stage. It began on 26 June with the round of 16 matches, and ended on 11 July with the final match of the tournament held at Soccer City, Johannesburg, in which Spain beat the Netherlands 1–0 after extra time to claim their first World Cup. The top two teams from each group (16 in total) advanced to the knockout stage to compete in a single-elimination–style tournament. A match for third place was included and played between the two losing teams of the semi-finals.

In the knockout stage (including the final), if a match was level at the end of 90 minutes, two periods of extra time (15 minutes each) would be played. If the score was still level after extra time, the match would be decided by a penalty shoot-out.

All times listed are South African Standard Time (UTC+2)

== Qualified teams ==
The top two placed teams from each of the eight groups qualified for the knockout stage.

Group	Winners	Runners-up
A	Uruguay	Mexico
B	Argentina	South Korea
C	United States	England
D	Germany	Ghana
E	Netherlands	Japan
F	Paraguay	Slovakia
G	Brazil	Portugal
H	Spain	Chile

== Bracket ==
Round of 16
26 June – Port Elizabeth
Uruguay	2
South Korea	1
26 June – Rustenburg
United States	1
Ghana (a.e.t.)	2
28 June – Durban
Netherlands	2
Slovakia	1
28 June – Johannesburg (Ellis Park)
Brazil	3
Chile	0
27 June – Johannesburg (Soccer City)
Argentina	3
Mexico	1
27 June – Bloemfontein
Germany	4
England	1
29 June – Pretoria
Paraguay (p)	0 (5)
Japan	0 (3)
29 June – Cape Town
Spain	1
Portugal	0

Quarter-finals
2 July – Johannesburg (Soccer City)
Uruguay (p)	1 (4)
Ghana	1 (2)
2 July – Port Elizabeth
Netherlands	2
Brazil	1
3 July – Cape Town
Argentina	0
Germany	4
3 July – Johannesburg (Ellis Park)
Paraguay	0
Spain	1

Semi-finals
6 July – Cape Town
Uruguay	2
Netherlands	3
7 July – Durban
Germany	0
Spain	1

Final
11 July – Johannesburg (Soccer City)
Netherlands	0
Spain (a.e.t.)	1
Match for third place
10 July – Port Elizabeth
Uruguay	2
Germany	3

== Round of 16 ==
=== Uruguay vs South Korea ===
Uruguay vs South Korea was the first match in the Round of 16. The match was held at the Nelson Mandela Bay Stadium in Port Elizabeth before a low crowd of 30,597. Uruguay won the match 2–1 with two goals from Luis Suárez, the second of which broke a 1–1 deadlock in the 80th minute. Suárez's first was scored when Diego Forlán made a low cross from the left that was not dealt with by the South Korean defence, leaving Suárez to score at the back post. Uruguay subsequently adopted a defensive posture, and South Korea had more chances to score. Eventually, Lee Chung-yong equalised in the 68th minute, scoring a headed goal following a free kick. Despite South Korea then having chances to win the match, Suárez scored Uruguay's winner in the 80th minute with a curling strike from the edge of the 18-yard box that went in off the inside of the post; this goal was regarded as one of the tournament's best. Korea missed more good chances in the final minutes of the game, giving Uruguay victory and passage to the quarter-finals for the first time since 1970, where they would face Ghana. After the match, Uruguayan coach Óscar Tabárez attributed his team's successful run to the number of players with experience at top-level overseas clubs. South Korean coach Huh Jung-moo claimed his side "controlled" the match and that Uruguay's goals were "lucky".

26 June 2010
16:00

Uruguay	2–1	South Korea
Suárez 8', 80'		Lee Chung-yong 68'

Nelson Mandela Bay Stadium, Port Elizabeth
Attendance: 30,597
Referee: Wolfgang Stark (Germany)

Uruguay	South Korea

GK	1	Fernando Muslera
RB	16	Maxi Pereira
CB	2	Diego Lugano (c)
CB	3	Diego Godín	(substituted off) 46'
LB	4	Jorge Fucile
DM	15	Diego Pérez
RM	17	Egidio Arévalo Ríos
LM	11	Álvaro Pereira	(substituted off) 74'
RF	7	Edinson Cavani
CF	10	Diego Forlán
LF	9	Luis Suárez	(substituted off) 84'
Substitutions:
DF	6	Mauricio Victorino	(substituted on) 46'
MF	14	Nicolás Lodeiro	(substituted on) 74'
MF	20	Álvaro Fernández	(substituted on) 84'
Manager:
Óscar Tabárez

GK	18	Jung Sung-ryong
RB	22	Cha Du-ri	(yellow card) 69'
CB	4	Cho Yong-hyung	(yellow card) 83'
CB	14	Lee Jung-soo
LB	12	Lee Young-pyo
CM	16	Ki Sung-yong		(substituted off) 85'
CM	8	Kim Jung-woo	(yellow card) 38'
RW	13	Kim Jae-sung		(substituted off) 61'
AM	7	Park Ji-sung (c)
LW	17	Lee Chung-yong
CF	10	Park Chu-young
Substitutions:
FW	20	Lee Dong-gook		(substituted on) 61'
FW	19	Yeom Ki-hun		(substituted on) 85'
Manager:
Huh Jung-moo

Man of the Match:
Luis Suárez (Uruguay)

Assistant referees:
Jan-Hendrik Salver (Germany)
Mike Pickel (Germany)
Fourth official:
Joel Aguilar (El Salvador)
Fifth official:
Juan Zumba (El Salvador)

=== United States vs Ghana ===
The match between the United States and Ghana was played on 26 June 2010 at the Royal Bafokeng Stadium in Rustenburg. The match was watched by 19 million Americans, making it the most watched association football match in American television history at the time. Heading into the 2026 FIFA World Cup, it is the most recent World Cup knockout match that did not feature neither a South American nor European side. The match was won by Ghana in extra time after Asamoah Gyan broke a 1–1 deadlock. Kevin-Prince Boateng scored the opening goal of the match for Ghana in the fifth minute. The goal followed an error by Ricardo Clark, who lost the ball to the Ghanaians in midfield. Boateng took the ball to the edge of the penalty area, beating United States goalkeeper Tim Howard with a low left-footed shot. Landon Donovan equalised with a penalty kick in the 62nd minute, which was awarded after Jonathan Mensah fouled Clint Dempsey. The United States had chances to win the game thereafter but were unable to get past Ghana goalkeeper Richard Kingson. The match thus went to extra time. In the third minute, Gyan latched onto a high long ball, chesting it down and holding off two defenders before scoring the winner. After the match, Ghana's coach Milovan Rajevac hailed his side's achievement in becoming one of the "best eight teams in the world", but regretted the number of players that would miss the quarter-final match against Uruguay because of injury or suspension. The president of the United States Soccer Federation, Sunil Gulati, lamented the team's failure to make the quarter-finals and thereby further raise the profile of the sport in the United States.

26 June 2010
20:30

United States	1–2 (a.e.t.)	Ghana
Donovan 62' (pen.)		Boateng 5'; Gyan 93'

Royal Bafokeng Stadium, Rustenburg
Attendance: 34,976
Referee: Viktor Kassai (Hungary)

United States	Ghana

GK	1	Tim Howard
RB	6	Steve Cherundolo	(yellow card) 18'
CB	15	Jay DeMerit
CB	3	Carlos Bocanegra (c)	(yellow card) 68'
LB	12	Jonathan Bornstein
CM	4	Michael Bradley
CM	13	Ricardo Clark	(yellow card) 7'	(substituted off) 31'
RW	8	Clint Dempsey
LW	10	Landon Donovan
CF	17	Jozy Altidore		(substituted off) 91'
CF	20	Robbie Findley		(substituted off) 46'
Substitutions:
MF	19	Maurice Edu		(substituted on) 31'
MF	22	Benny Feilhaber		(substituted on) 46'
FW	9	Herculez Gomez		(substituted on) 91'
Manager:
Bob Bradley

GK	22	Richard Kingson
CB	4	John Paintsil
CB	5	John Mensah (c)
CB	8	Jonathan Mensah	(yellow card) 61'
RWB	7	Samuel Inkoom		(substituted off) 113'
LWB	2	Hans Sarpei		(substituted off) 73'
RM	21	Kwadwo Asamoah
CM	6	Anthony Annan
CM	23	Kevin-Prince Boateng		(substituted off) 78'
LM	13	André Ayew	(yellow card) 90+2'
CF	3	Asamoah Gyan
Substitutions:
DF	19	Lee Addy		(substituted on) 73'
MF	10	Stephen Appiah		(substituted on) 78'
MF	11	Sulley Muntari		(substituted on) 113'
Manager:
(Serbia) Milovan Rajevac

Man of the Match:
André Ayew (Ghana)

Assistant referees:
Gábor Erős (Hungary)
Tibor Vámos (Hungary)
Fourth official:
Michael Hester (New Zealand)
Fifth official:
Tevita Makasini (Tonga)

=== Germany vs England ===
Germany and England played each other on 27 June 2010 at the Free State Stadium in Bloemfontein. Germany took the lead in the 20th minute after English defenders Matthew Upson and John Terry were at fault in allowing Miroslav Klose to latch on to a long goal kick from Manuel Neuer and score. Lukas Podolski doubled Germany's lead 12 minutes later, although England pulled one goal back through Upson in the 37th minute, heading in a cross from Steven Gerrard. A controversial moment occurred in the 39th minute: a shot by Frank Lampard was not awarded as a goal despite the ball bouncing off the crossbar and clearly crossing the line by at least a foot. Had the goal been awarded, England would have equalised at 2–2. Thomas Müller subsequently scored two goals in the second half, extending Germany's lead to 4–1. His first came at the end of a swift German counter-attack in the 67th minute, the goal being assisted by Bastian Schweinsteiger. His second came from an error by Gareth Barry and was set up by Mesut Özil. Germany won the match, 4–1. Germany progressed to meet Argentina in the quarter-final.

The ghost goal incident in this match was a major factor in the FIFA and IFAB decision to test and later implement new rules allowing goal-line technology to be used in football.

27 June 2010
16:00

Germany	4–1	England
Klose 20'; Podolski 32'; Müller 67', 70'		Upson 37'

Free State Stadium, Bloemfontein
Attendance: 40,510
Referee: Jorge Larrionda (Uruguay)

Germany	England

GK	1	Manuel Neuer
RB	16	Philipp Lahm (c)
CB	3	Arne Friedrich	(yellow card) 47'
CB	17	Per Mertesacker
LB	20	Jérôme Boateng
CM	7	Bastian Schweinsteiger
CM	6	Sami Khedira
RW	13	Thomas Müller		(substituted off) 72'
AM	8	Mesut Özil		(substituted off) 83'
LW	10	Lukas Podolski
CF	11	Miroslav Klose		(substituted off) 72'
Substitutions:
MF	15	Piotr Trochowski		(substituted on) 72'
FW	23	Mario Gómez		(substituted on) 72'
FW	9	Stefan Kießling		(substituted on) 83'
Manager:
Joachim Löw

GK	1	David James
RB	2	Glen Johnson	(yellow card) 81'	(substituted off) 87'
CB	15	Matthew Upson
CB	6	John Terry
LB	3	Ashley Cole
CM	8	Frank Lampard
CM	14	Gareth Barry
RW	16	James Milner		(substituted off) 64'
LW	4	Steven Gerrard (c)
CF	19	Jermain Defoe		(substituted off) 71'
CF	10	Wayne Rooney
Substitutions:
MF	11	Joe Cole		(substituted on) 64'
FW	21	Emile Heskey		(substituted on) 71'
MF	17	Shaun Wright-Phillips		(substituted on) 87'
Manager:
(Italy) Fabio Capello

Man of the Match:
Thomas Müller (Germany)

Assistant referees:
Pablo Fandino (Uruguay)
Mauricio Espinosa (Uruguay)
Fourth official:
Martín Vázquez (Uruguay)
Fifth official:
Miguel Nievas (Uruguay)

=== Argentina vs Mexico ===
Argentina and Mexico met on 27 June; Argentina won the match 3–1 for a place in the quarter-finals against Germany. The match was overshadowed by a refereeing error that allowed Argentina's opening goal. Carlos Tevez headed the ball into the net from a Lionel Messi pass in the 25th minute, but replays showed there were no players between Tevez and the goal, rendering his goal clearly offside. Replays of the goal were shown in the stadium but the decision to award the goal was not overturned. Tevez said he knew that the goal was offside, but chose not to say anything. Argentina's second goal came from a defensive error from Ricardo Osorio as a poor pass out of defence was snatched by Gonzalo Higuaín to round the keeper and score. After half-time, Tevez scored his second goal of the match to give Argentina a three-goal lead, with a long range shot that found the top corner of the Mexican goal. Javier Hernández scored for Mexico in the 71st minute but it turned out to be no more than a consolation goal, as Argentina held on to win 3–1. Mexico's coach Javier Aguirre resigned after the match, accepting responsibility for not meeting the team's target of the quarter-finals. Tevez conceded that he was aware his first goal was offside at the time, although Aguirre deflected the blame for his side's loss away from the refereeing.

27 June 2010
20:30

Argentina	3–1	Mexico
Tevez 26', 52'; Higuaín 33'		Hernández 71'

Soccer City, Johannesburg
Attendance: 84,377
Referee: Roberto Rosetti (Italy)

Argentina	Mexico

GK	22	Sergio Romero
RB	15	Nicolás Otamendi
CB	2	Martín Demichelis
CB	4	Nicolás Burdisso
LB	6	Gabriel Heinze
DM	14	Javier Mascherano (c)
RM	20	Maxi Rodríguez	(substituted off) 87'
LM	7	Ángel Di María	(substituted off) 79'
AM	10	Lionel Messi
CF	11	Carlos Tevez	(substituted off) 69'
CF	9	Gonzalo Higuaín
Substitutions:
MF	8	Juan Sebastián Verón	(substituted on) 69'
MF	17	Jonás Gutiérrez	(substituted on) 79'
MF	23	Javier Pastore	(substituted on) 87'
Manager:
Diego Maradona

GK	1	Óscar Pérez
RB	5	Ricardo Osorio
CB	2	Francisco Javier Rodríguez
CB	4	Rafael Márquez (c)	(yellow card) 28'
LB	3	Carlos Salcido
RM	16	Efraín Juárez
CM	6	Gerardo Torrado
LM	18	Andrés Guardado		(substituted off) 61'
AM	17	Giovani dos Santos
AM	21	Adolfo Bautista		(substituted off) 46'
CF	14	Javier Hernández
Substitutions:
MF	7	Pablo Barrera		(substituted on) 46'
FW	9	Guillermo Franco		(substituted on) 61'
Manager:
Javier Aguirre

Man of the Match:
Carlos Tevez (Argentina)

Assistant referees:
Paolo Calcagno (Italy)
Stefano Ayroldi (Italy)
Fourth official:
Jerome Damon (South Africa)
Fifth official:
Célestin Ntagungira (Rwanda)

=== Netherlands vs Slovakia ===
The Netherlands defeated Slovakia 2–1 on 28 June 2010 at the Moses Mabhida Stadium in Durban. The Netherlands' first goal was an excellent individual effort from Arjen Robben in the 18th minute, taking on the Slovak defence with the ball before scoring from 25 yards. The Dutch had chances to extend their lead in the second half, with the most prominent coming when Robben cut inside on his left foot just like he did when he scored the first goal, but this time, Slovak goalkeeper Ján Mucha saved the shot going to his far post. The Slovaks also had two big opportunities to equalise but forced a save from Maarten Stekelenburg each time. The Dutch sealed their win in the 84th minute when Wesley Sneijder scored off an assist from Dirk Kuyt into an unguarded net after Kuyt got the ball past Mucha. Róbert Vittek slotted a penalty kick late in stoppage time, but it was no more than a consolation goal for Slovakia. The penalty had been awarded for a trip on him by Stekelenburg. The Netherlands' win threatened to be overshadowed by Robin van Persie responding angrily to being substituted by coach Bert van Marwijk. Van Marwijk called a team meeting over the incident and later insisted that there was no residual unrest in the squad.

28 June 2010
16:00

Netherlands	2–1	Slovakia
Robben 18'; Sneijder 84'		Vittek 90+4' (pen.)

Moses Mabhida Stadium, Durban
Attendance: 61,962
Referee: Alberto Undiano Mallenco (Spain)

Netherlands	Slovakia

GK	1	Maarten Stekelenburg	(yellow card) 90+3'
RB	2	Gregory van der Wiel
CB	3	John Heitinga
CB	4	Joris Mathijsen
LB	5	Giovanni van Bronckhorst (c)
DM	6	Mark van Bommel
DM	8	Nigel de Jong
RW	7	Dirk Kuyt
AM	10	Wesley Sneijder		(substituted off) 90+2'
LW	11	Arjen Robben	(yellow card) 31'	(substituted off) 71'
CF	9	Robin van Persie		(substituted off) 80'
Substitutions:
FW	17	Eljero Elia		(substituted on) 71'
FW	21	Klaas-Jan Huntelaar		(substituted on) 80'
MF	20	Ibrahim Afellay		(substituted on) 90+2'
Manager:
Bert van Marwijk

GK	1	Ján Mucha
RB	2	Peter Pekarík
CB	3	Martin Škrtel	(yellow card) 84'
CB	16	Ján Ďurica
LB	5	Radoslav Zabavník		(substituted off) 88'
DM	19	Juraj Kucka	(yellow card) 40'
RM	7	Vladimír Weiss
LM	15	Miroslav Stoch
AM	17	Marek Hamšík (c)		(substituted off) 87'
CF	18	Erik Jendrišek		(substituted off) 71'
CF	11	Róbert Vittek
Substitutions:
MF	20	Kamil Kopúnek	(yellow card) 72'	(substituted on) 71'
MF	10	Marek Sapara		(substituted on) 87'
FW	14	Martin Jakubko		(substituted on) 88'
Manager:
Vladimír Weiss

Man of the Match:
Arjen Robben (Netherlands)

Assistant referees:
Fermín Martínez Ibáñez (Spain)
Juan Carlos Yuste Jiménez (Spain)
Fourth official:
Stéphane Lannoy (France)
Fifth official:
Laurent Ugo (France)

=== Brazil vs Chile ===
Brazil soundly defeated Chile 3–0 on 28 June 2010 at Ellis Park Stadium, Johannesburg to progress to a quarter-final match against the Netherlands. Brazil's first goal came from a corner kick taken by Maicon in the 34th minute, with Juan heading the ball into the goal without being marked. Brazil had doubled its lead within five minutes after a free-flowing passing movement involving Robinho and Kaká that teed up Luís Fabiano to score after taking the ball around the Chilean goalkeeper. Robinho himself sealed victory for Brazil in the second half, scoring following a long run with the ball by Ramires. After the match, Chile's coach Marcelo Bielsa conceded that his team had been outplayed, arguing that in his position there was "little one can do" when up against a team of Brazil's quality.

28 June 2010
20:30

Brazil	3–0	Chile
Juan 35'; Luís Fabiano 38'; Robinho 59'

Ellis Park Stadium, Johannesburg
Attendance: 54,096
Referee: Howard Webb (England)

Brazil	Chile

GK	1	Júlio César
RB	2	Maicon
CB	3	Lúcio (c)
CB	4	Juan
LB	6	Michel Bastos
DM	8	Gilberto Silva
RM	13	Dani Alves
LM	18	Ramires	(yellow card) 72'
AM	10	Kaká	(yellow card) 30'	(substituted off) 81'
SS	11	Robinho		(substituted off) 85'
CF	9	Luís Fabiano		(substituted off) 76'
Substitutions:
FW	21	Nilmar		(substituted on) 76'
MF	20	Kléberson		(substituted on) 81'
DF	16	Gilberto		(substituted on) 85'
Manager:
Dunga

GK	1	Claudio Bravo (c)
RB	4	Mauricio Isla		(substituted off) 62'
CB	5	Pablo Contreras		(substituted off) 46'
CB	18	Gonzalo Jara
LB	2	Ismael Fuentes	(yellow card) 68'
RM	8	Arturo Vidal	(yellow card) 47'
CM	6	Carlos Carmona
LM	15	Jean Beausejour
RF	7	Alexis Sánchez
CF	9	Humberto Suazo
LF	11	Mark González		(substituted off) 46'
Substitutions:
MF	10	Jorge Valdivia		(substituted on) 46'
MF	21	Rodrigo Tello		(substituted on) 46'
MF	20	Rodrigo Millar	(yellow card) 80'	(substituted on) 62'
Manager:
(Argentina) Marcelo Bielsa

Man of the Match:
Robinho (Brazil)

Assistant referees:
Darren Cann (England)
Michael Mullarkey (England)
Fourth official:
Martin Hansson (Sweden)
Fifth official:
Stefan Wittberg (Sweden)

=== Paraguay vs Japan ===
Paraguay and Japan met at the Loftus Versfeld Stadium in Pretoria on 29 June 2010. The match was decided by a penalty shoot-out after the score was locked at 0–0 for 120 minutes. Paraguay won the shoot-out and progressed to their first ever World Cup quarter-final. The match was a generally unexciting affair, as Japan adopted a defensive posture while Paraguay itself maintained a solid defence. The first half produced the occasional chance on goal with Lucas Barrios having a shot saved shortly before a long-distance shot from Daisuke Matsui hit the crossbar of Paraguay's goal. The second half was similar, with either side producing occasional chances to score rather than periods of dominance. The result of the deadlock was extra time, which continued goalless. A penalty shoot-out ensued, in which Yuichi Komano missed a spot kick for Japan. Paraguay scored all five of its penalties, clinching the win and passage to the quarter-finals. After the match, Japan's coach Takeshi Okada resigned and Shunsuke Nakamura retired from international football.

29 June 2010
16:00

Paraguay	0–0 (a.e.t.)	Japan
Penalties
Barreto (penalty scored); Barrios (penalty scored); Riveros (penalty scored); Valdez (penalty scored); Cardozo (penalty scored)	5–3	(penalty scored) Endō; (penalty scored) Hasebe; (penalty missed) Komano; (penalty scored) Honda

Loftus Versfeld Stadium, Pretoria
Attendance: 36,742
Referee: Frank De Bleeckere (Belgium)

Paraguay	Japan

GK	1	Justo Villar (c)
RB	6	Carlos Bonet
CB	14	Paulo da Silva
CB	21	Antolín Alcaraz
LB	3	Claudio Morel
DM	20	Néstor Ortigoza		(substituted off) 75'
CM	13	Enrique Vera
CM	16	Cristian Riveros	(yellow card) 118'
RW	9	Roque Santa Cruz		(substituted off) 94'
LW	10	Édgar Benítez		(substituted off) 60'
CF	19	Lucas Barrios
Substitutions:
FW	18	Nelson Valdez		(substituted on) 60'
MF	8	Édgar Barreto		(substituted on) 75'
FW	7	Óscar Cardozo		(substituted on) 94'
Manager:
(Argentina) Gerardo Martino

GK	21	Eiji Kawashima
RB	3	Yūichi Komano
CB	22	Yuji Nakazawa
CB	4	Marcus Tulio Tanaka
LB	5	Yuto Nagatomo	(yellow card) 72'
DM	2	Yuki Abe		(substituted off) 81'
CM	17	Makoto Hasebe (c)
CM	7	Yasuhito Endō	(yellow card) 113'
RW	8	Daisuke Matsui	(yellow card) 58'	(substituted off) 65'
LW	16	Yoshito Ōkubo		(substituted off) 106'
CF	18	Keisuke Honda	(yellow card) 90+3'
Substitutions:
FW	9	Shinji Okazaki		(substituted on) 65'
MF	14	Kengo Nakamura		(substituted on) 81'
FW	11	Keiji Tamada		(substituted on) 106'
Manager:
Takeshi Okada

Man of the Match:
Keisuke Honda (Japan)

Assistant referees:
Peter Hermans (Belgium)
Walter Vromans (Belgium)
Fourth official:
Peter O'Leary (New Zealand)
Fifth official:
Matthew Taro (Solomon Islands)

=== Spain vs Portugal ===
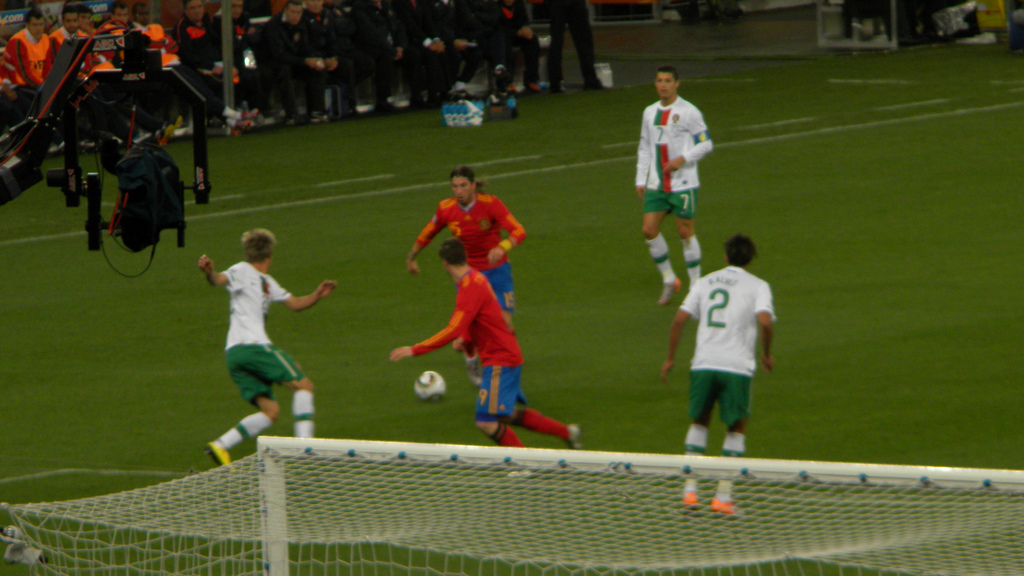
Sergio Ramos of Spain tries to pass the ball to Fernando Torres as Portugal's Fábio Coentrão, Bruno Alves and Cristiano Ronaldo look on.

Spain defeated Portugal 1–0 in the Iberian derby to progress to the quarter-finals where they were to play Paraguay. The match took place on 29 June 2010 at the Cape Town Stadium. Spain dominated their neighbours with a ball possession ratio of 62% and several opportunities but had to endure a pair of missed chances by the Portuguese in the first half, including one by Hugo Almeida which nearly resulted in a goal. In the second half, the Portuguese attacking threat decreased and the entry of Fernando Llorente for Fernando Torres brought new energy to the Spanish team. The only goal of the match came in the 63rd minute: David Villa picked up a brilliant pass by Xavi, having his first shot saved, but then lifted the rebound into the roof of the net.

29 June 2010
20:30

Spain	1–0	Portugal
Villa 63'

Cape Town Stadium, Cape Town
Attendance: 62,955
Referee: Héctor Baldassi (Argentina)

Spain	Portugal

GK	1	Iker Casillas (c)
RB	15	Sergio Ramos
CB	3	Gerard Piqué
CB	5	Carles Puyol
LB	11	Joan Capdevila
CM	16	Sergio Busquets
CM	14	Xabi Alonso	(yellow card) 74'	(substituted off) 90+3'
RW	8	Xavi
LW	6	Andrés Iniesta
SS	7	David Villa		(substituted off) 88'
CF	9	Fernando Torres		(substituted off) 58'
Substitutions:
FW	19	Fernando Llorente		(substituted on) 58'
FW	18	Pedro		(substituted on) 88'
DF	4	Carlos Marchena		(substituted on) 90+3'
Manager:
Vicente del Bosque

GK	1	Eduardo
RB	21	Ricardo Costa	(red card) 89'
CB	6	Ricardo Carvalho
CB	2	Bruno Alves
LB	23	Fábio Coentrão
DM	15	Pepe		(substituted off) 72'
CM	19	Tiago	(yellow card) 80'
CM	16	Raul Meireles
RW	11	Simão		(substituted off) 72'
LW	7	Cristiano Ronaldo (c)
CF	18	Hugo Almeida		(substituted off) 58'
Substitutions:
MF	10	Danny		(substituted on) 58'
FW	9	Liédson		(substituted on) 72'
MF	8	Pedro Mendes		(substituted on) 72'
Manager:
Carlos Queiroz

Man of the Match:
Xavi (Spain)

Assistant referees:
Ricardo Casas (Argentina)
Hernán Maidana (Argentina)
Fourth official:
Carlos Batres (Guatemala)
Fifth official:
Carlos Pastrana (Honduras)

== Quarter-finals ==
=== Netherlands vs Brazil ===
External videos
- Netherlands v Brazil (South Africa 2010) Full match on YouTube

The Netherlands versus Brazil was the first quarter-final match, held on 2 July 2010 at the Nelson Mandela Bay Stadium in Port Elizabeth. The Netherlands won 2–1 after recovering from a 1–0 deficit, knocking the five-time world champions Brazil out of the tournament. The Netherlands' team was affected by an injury to Joris Mathijsen before the match. His replacement in defence – André Ooijer – and fellow central defender John Heitinga were at fault for Brazil's opening goal in the 10th minute, when Robinho was allowed to latch onto a deep pass from Felipe Melo and score without being challenged by the defence. For the rest of the first half, the Dutch were largely frustrated by the Brazilian defence, and needed to rely on Maarten Stekelenburg's goalkeeping to prevent Brazil from extending its lead. However, eight minutes after half-time, the Dutch equalised through a goal from Sneijder. The goal was initially recorded as an own goal by Felipe Melo, but FIFA overturned the decision to credit the goal to Sneijder. Having equalised, the Netherlands subsequently took the lead from a Robben corner kick in the 68th minute, Sneijder heading the ball in after a flick-on from Kuyt. Brazil's chances of restoring parity were damaged when Felipe Melo was sent off for a stamp on Robben. The Netherlands held out for the win, thereby earning passage to the semi-finals. Brazil's coach Dunga confirmed after the match that he would be leaving the position upon the expiry of his contract, admitting responsibility for Brazil's defeat. The Dutch coach Bert van Marwijk attacked the Brazilian team after the match, claiming they had provoked his side, and that Melo's stamp on Robben left him "ashamed for Brazilian football."

2 July 2010
16:00

Netherlands	2–1	Brazil
Sneijder 53', 68'		Robinho 10'

Nelson Mandela Bay Stadium, Port Elizabeth
Attendance: 40,186
Referee: Yuichi Nishimura (Japan)

Netherlands	Brazil

GK	1	Maarten Stekelenburg
RB	2	Gregory van der Wiel	(yellow card) 47'
CB	3	John Heitinga	(yellow card) 14'
CB	13	André Ooijer	(yellow card) 76'
LB	5	Giovanni van Bronckhorst (c)
DM	6	Mark van Bommel
DM	8	Nigel de Jong	(yellow card) 64'
RW	11	Arjen Robben
AM	10	Wesley Sneijder
LW	7	Dirk Kuyt
CF	9	Robin van Persie		(substituted off) 85'
Substitutions:
FW	21	Klaas-Jan Huntelaar		(substituted on) 85'
Manager:
Bert van Marwijk

GK	1	Júlio César
RB	2	Maicon
CB	3	Lúcio (c)
CB	4	Juan
LB	6	Michel Bastos	(yellow card) 37'	(substituted off) 62'
DM	5	Felipe Melo	(red card) 73'
RM	13	Dani Alves
LM	8	Gilberto Silva
AM	10	Kaká
SS	11	Robinho
CF	9	Luís Fabiano		(substituted off) 77'
Substitutions:
DF	16	Gilberto		(substituted on) 62'
FW	21	Nilmar		(substituted on) 77'
Manager:
Dunga

Man of the Match:
Wesley Sneijder (Netherlands)

Assistant referees:
Toru Sagara (Japan)
Jeong Hae-sang (South Korea)
Fourth official:
Khalil Al Ghamdi (Saudi Arabia)
Fifth official:
Hassan Kamranifar (Iran)

=== Uruguay vs Ghana ===
Uruguay and Ghana met on 2 July 2010 at Soccer City, Johannesburg, for a place in the semi-final against the Netherlands. It was the first time that the teams had ever played each other in a senior competitive football match. After a dramatic 120 minutes of play (including extra time) that finished 1–1, Uruguay won in a penalty shoot-out 4–2. Uruguay dominated the early periods of the match, but suffered an injury to captain Diego Lugano in the first half. Just before half-time, Ghana took the lead when Sulley Muntari was allowed time on the ball by Uruguay, and took advantage by scoring with a shot from 40 yards. After half-time, Diego Forlán pulled Uruguay level with a free kick from the left side of the field that went over the head of Ghana's goalkeeper Richard Kingson. While both teams had chances to win, the match proceeded to extra time as the scores remained level. Late in extra time, Ghana sent a free kick into the penalty area; Luis Suárez blocked Stephen Appiah's shot on the goal line. On the rebound, Dominic Adiyiah's header was heading into the goal, but Suárez blatantly blocked the shot with his hand to save what would have been the extra-time winner and he was red carded. Asamoah Gyan missed the ensuing penalty kick off the crossbar and Suárez celebrated the miss. In the shoot-out, Gyan converted his penalty, as did everybody else until Uruguay goalkeeper Fernando Muslera saved captain John Mensah's penalty (Ghana's third). Uruguay's Maxi Pereira then hit his penalty over the bar, but then Adiyiah's penalty was saved by Muslera. Sebastián Abreu converted Uruguay's fifth spot kick by lightly chipping it Panenka-style to win the match.

After the game, Suárez said "I made the save of the tournament", and, referring to the infamous handball goal scored by Diego Maradona in the 1986 World Cup, claimed that "The 'Hand of God' now belongs to me". Suárez claimed he had no alternative and was acting out of instinct. Forlán agreed that Suárez saved the game, "Suárez this time, instead of scoring goals, he saved one, I think he saved the game." Ghana coach Milovan Rajevac said the play was an "injustice" and Suárez was labeled a "villain" and a "cheat". However, Uruguay coach Óscar Tabárez said these labels were too harsh: "Well, there was a handball in the penalty area, there was a red card and Suárez was thrown out. Saying that Ghana were cheated out of the game is too harsh. We have to go by the rules. It might have been a mistake by my player but I do not like that word 'cheating'." Ghana was the last African team left in the tournament and if they had won, they would have been the first team from Africa to ever qualify for the semi-finals. Thus, Suárez was said to have "enraged an entire continent [Africa]." But others viewed him as a hero who sacrificed himself in the semi-final for the unlikely chance that his team could win. A distraught Gyan conceded, "I would say Suárez is a hero now in his own country, because the ball was going in and he held it with his hand. He is a hero now."

American sportswriter and podcaster Bill Simmons, at the time a columnist for ESPN Page 2, listed Ghana vs. Uruguay as second on his "Levels of Losing" of most painful sports losses. He called it "The Continental Stomach Punch": "Ghana blowing the potential winning penalty kick against Uruguay in the World Cup, then losing the game on penalty kicks a few minutes later. That was like all three Cleveland teams (the Browns, Cavaliers and Guardians – still known as the Indians at the time) losing their worst possible game at the same time, only if Cleveland were a Third World country." He ranked it behind only "That Game" – originally referring to Game 6 of the 1986 World Series between the Boston Red Sox and the New York Mets, when the Red Sox were one strike away multiple times from winning their first championship since 1918 only to lose following Bill Buckner's error in extra innings.

2 July 2010
20:30

Uruguay	1–1 (a.e.t.)	Ghana
Forlán 55'		Muntari 45+2'
Penalties
Forlán (penalty scored); Victorino (penalty scored); Scotti (penalty scored); M. Pereira (penalty missed); Abreu (penalty scored)	4–2	(penalty scored) Gyan; (penalty scored) Appiah; (penalty missed) Mensah; (penalty missed) Adiyiah

Soccer City, Johannesburg
Attendance: 84,017
Referee: Olegário Benquerença (Portugal)

Uruguay	Ghana

GK	1	Fernando Muslera
RB	16	Maxi Pereira
CB	2	Diego Lugano (c)		(substituted off) 38'
CB	6	Mauricio Victorino
LB	4	Jorge Fucile	(yellow card) 20'
RM	20	Álvaro Fernández		(substituted off) 46'
CM	15	Diego Pérez	(yellow card) 59'
CM	17	Egidio Arévalo Ríos	(yellow card) 48'
LM	7	Edinson Cavani		(substituted off) 76'
CF	9	Luis Suárez	(red card) 120+1'
CF	10	Diego Forlán
Substitutions:
DF	19	Andrés Scotti		(substituted on) 38'
MF	14	Nicolás Lodeiro		(substituted on) 46'
FW	13	Sebastián Abreu		(substituted on) 76'
Manager:
Óscar Tabárez

GK	22	Richard Kingson
RB	4	John Paintsil	(yellow card) 54'
CB	15	Isaac Vorsah
CB	5	John Mensah (c)	(yellow card) 93'
LB	2	Hans Sarpei	(yellow card) 77'
DM	6	Anthony Annan
RM	7	Samuel Inkoom		(substituted off) 74'
CM	21	Kwadwo Asamoah
CM	23	Kevin-Prince Boateng
LM	11	Sulley Muntari		(substituted off) 88'
CF	3	Asamoah Gyan
Substitutions:
MF	10	Stephen Appiah		(substituted on) 74'
FW	18	Dominic Adiyiah		(substituted on) 88'
Manager:
(Serbia) Milovan Rajevac

Man of the Match:
Diego Forlán (Uruguay)

Assistant referees:
José Manuel Silva Cardinal (Portugal)
Bertino Miranda (Portugal)
Fourth official:
Alberto Undiano Mallenco (Spain)
Fifth official:
Fermín Martínez Ibáñez (Spain)

=== Argentina vs Germany ===
Thomas Müller heads in the opening goal for Germany from Bastian Schweinsteiger's free kick.

On 3 July 2010, Germany beat Argentina 4–0 at the Cape Town Stadium to reach the semi-finals. It was the third time in the tournament that Germany had scored four goals in a match. Germany's first goal was scored by Thomas Müller in the third minute of the match with a header from a free kick taken by Bastian Schweinsteiger. Early in the second half, Argentina pressed Germany and came close to scoring on a number of occasions, but Germany hit back on a counter-attack in the 67th minute when Miroslav Klose scored into an empty goal from a pass by Lukas Podolski. Germany's third goal came from Arne Friedrich after sliding the ball inside from Schweinsteiger's pass seven minutes later, before Klose took the score to 4–0, volleying the ball into the net off a cross from Mesut Özil. The 4–0 defeat was Argentina's biggest loss at a World Cup since 1974. Germany's coach Joachim Löw hailed his side's performance as one of "absolute class", but admitted the suspension of Müller for picking up a yellow card was a blow.

3 July 2010
16:00

Argentina	0–4	Germany
		Müller 3'; Klose 68', 89'; Friedrich 74'

Cape Town Stadium, Cape Town
Attendance: 64,100
Referee: Ravshan Irmatov (Uzbekistan)

Argentina	Germany

GK	22	Sergio Romero
RB	15	Nicolás Otamendi	(yellow card) 11'	(substituted off) 70'
CB	2	Martín Demichelis
CB	4	Nicolás Burdisso
LB	6	Gabriel Heinze
DM	14	Javier Mascherano (c)	(yellow card) 80'
RM	20	Maxi Rodríguez
LM	7	Ángel Di María		(substituted off) 75'
AM	10	Lionel Messi
CF	9	Gonzalo Higuaín
CF	11	Carlos Tevez
Substitutions:
MF	23	Javier Pastore		(substituted on) 70'
FW	16	Sergio Agüero		(substituted on) 75'
Manager:
Diego Maradona

GK	1	Manuel Neuer
RB	16	Philipp Lahm (c)
CB	17	Per Mertesacker
CB	3	Arne Friedrich
LB	20	Jérôme Boateng		(substituted off) 72'
DM	6	Sami Khedira		(substituted off) 77'
DM	7	Bastian Schweinsteiger
RW	13	Thomas Müller	(yellow card) 35'	(substituted off) 84'
AM	8	Mesut Özil
LW	10	Lukas Podolski
CF	11	Miroslav Klose
Substitutions:
DF	2	Marcell Jansen		(substituted on) 72'
MF	18	Toni Kroos		(substituted on) 77'
MF	15	Piotr Trochowski		(substituted on) 84'
Manager:
Joachim Löw

Man of the Match:
Bastian Schweinsteiger (Germany)

Assistant referees:
Rafael Ilyasov (Uzbekistan)
Bakhadyr Kochkarov (Kyrgyzstan)
Fourth official:
Jerome Damon (South Africa)
Fifth official:
Enock Molefe (South Africa)

=== Paraguay vs Spain ===
On 3 July 2010, Spain defeated Paraguay 1–0, to secure entry to the semi-finals where they would meet Germany. It was the first time that Spain had progressed to the semi-final of a World Cup since 1950; while for Paraguay, the quarter-final appearance was also the country's best ever performance. The first half of the match finished goalless, although both sides had chances to score and Paraguay's Nelson Valdez had a goal ruled out as offside. The match suddenly became eventful in the second half due to a string of penalty kicks. First, Óscar Cardozo was pulled down by Gerard Piqué in Spain's penalty area and Paraguay was awarded a penalty. Cardozo took the penalty himself but it was saved by Spain's goalkeeper Iker Casillas. Spain soon after launched an attack at the other end of the field, in which David Villa was ruled by the referee to have been brought down by Antolín Alcaraz. Xabi Alonso stepped up to take the penalty kick and seemed to have scored, only for the referee to order it be retaken because of encroachment by a Spanish player into the penalty area before the kick was taken. Xabi Alonso's retake was saved by Paraguayan goalkeeper Justo Villar. As a result, the score remained 0–0 after the three penalty kicks. However, Spain ultimately managed to take the lead in the 82nd minute: David Villa collected a rebounded shot off the right post from Pedro, to score himself with a shot that again hit the right post before going in off the left post. The goal turned out to be the winner for Spain. After the match, Spain's coach Vicente del Bosque conceded that his side were not playing at their best and were starved of possession. He also noted his view that Spain's next opponents Germany were the best team at the World Cup. Paraguay's coach Gerardo Martino stated he would be leaving his position at the end of his contract.

3 July 2010
20:30

Paraguay	0–1	Spain
		Villa 83'

Ellis Park Stadium, Johannesburg
Attendance: 55,359
Referee: Carlos Batres (Guatemala)

Paraguay	Spain

GK	1	Justo Villar (c)
RB	2	Darío Verón
CB	14	Paulo da Silva
CB	21	Antolín Alcaraz	(yellow card) 59'
LB	3	Claudio Morel	(yellow card) 71'
DM	15	Víctor Cáceres	(yellow card) 59'	(substituted off) 84'
RM	11	Jonathan Santana	(yellow card) 88'
CM	8	Édgar Barreto		(substituted off) 64'
LM	16	Cristian Riveros
SS	18	Nelson Valdez		(substituted off) 72'
CF	7	Óscar Cardozo
Substitutions:
MF	13	Enrique Vera		(substituted on) 64'
FW	9	Roque Santa Cruz		(substituted on) 72'
FW	19	Lucas Barrios		(substituted on) 84'
Manager:
(Argentina) Gerardo Martino

GK	1	Iker Casillas (c)
RB	15	Sergio Ramos
CB	3	Gerard Piqué	(yellow card) 57'
CB	5	Carles Puyol		(substituted off) 84'
LB	11	Joan Capdevila
DM	16	Sergio Busquets	(yellow card) 63'
RM	6	Andrés Iniesta
CM	8	Xavi
LM	14	Xabi Alonso		(substituted off) 75'
SS	7	David Villa
CF	9	Fernando Torres		(substituted off) 56'
Substitutions:
MF	10	Cesc Fàbregas		(substituted on) 56'
FW	18	Pedro		(substituted on) 75'
DF	4	Carlos Marchena		(substituted on) 84'
Manager:
Vicente del Bosque

Man of the Match:
Andrés Iniesta (Spain)

Assistant referees:
Leonel Leal (Costa Rica)
Carlos Pastrana (Honduras)
Fourth official:
Benito Archundia (Mexico)
Fifth official:
Héctor Vergara (Canada)

== Semi-finals ==
=== Uruguay vs Netherlands ===
Uruguay played the Netherlands in the first semi-final on 6 July 2010 at the Cape Town Stadium. The Netherlands won the match 3–2, thereby qualifying for the final for the first time since the 1978 World Cup. Uruguay adopted a defensive posture early in the match, but were only able to hold their opponents scoreless for 18 minutes, when Dutch captain Giovanni van Bronckhorst scored from 35 yards into the top right corner of the goal. However, the Netherlands were unable to capitalise on their lead, as Diego Forlán equalised in the 41st minute (1–1) when his shot from 25 yards hit squarely in the middle of the goal was misjudged by goalkeeper Maarten Stekelenburg who missed it by millimetres. The Netherlands regained the lead in the second half, as a pass from Rafael van der Vaart reached Wesley Sneijder who hit it into the side-netting as Muslera dived and missed it by inches. Three minutes later, Kuyt crossed to Robben, who headed it in to make it 3–1. The Netherlands suffered a late scare when Maxi Pereira, who missed a penalty against Ghana, scored a stoppage-time free kick; however, the match finished 3–2 despite desperate Uruguayan attempts to equalise. After the match, Uruguay coach Óscar Tabárez spoke of his pride in his team for reaching the semi-finals.

6 July 2010
20:30

Uruguay	2–3	Netherlands
Forlán 41'; M. Pereira 90+2'		Van Bronckhorst 18'; Sneijder 70'; Robben 73'

Cape Town Stadium, Cape Town
Attendance: 62,479
Referee: Ravshan Irmatov (Uzbekistan)

Uruguay	Netherlands

GK	1	Fernando Muslera
RB	16	Maxi Pereira	(yellow card) 21'
CB	3	Diego Godín
CB	6	Mauricio Victorino
LB	22	Martín Cáceres	(yellow card) 29'
RM	15	Diego Pérez
CM	5	Walter Gargano
CM	17	Egidio Arévalo Ríos
LM	11	Álvaro Pereira		(substituted off) 78'
CF	7	Edinson Cavani
CF	10	Diego Forlán (c)		(substituted off) 84'
Substitutions:
FW	13	Sebastián Abreu		(substituted on) 78'
FW	21	Sebastián Fernández		(substituted on) 84'
Manager:
Óscar Tabárez

GK	1	Maarten Stekelenburg
RB	12	Khalid Boulahrouz	(yellow card) 78'
CB	3	John Heitinga
CB	4	Joris Mathijsen
LB	5	Giovanni van Bronckhorst (c)
DM	6	Mark van Bommel	(yellow card) 90+5'
DM	14	Demy de Zeeuw		(substituted off) 46'
RW	11	Arjen Robben		(substituted off) 89'
AM	10	Wesley Sneijder	(yellow card) 29'
LW	7	Dirk Kuyt
CF	9	Robin van Persie
Substitutions:
MF	23	Rafael van der Vaart		(substituted on) 46'
MF	17	Eljero Elia		(substituted on) 89'
Manager:
Bert van Marwijk

Man of the Match:
Wesley Sneijder (Netherlands)

Assistant referees:
Rafael Ilyasov (Uzbekistan)
Bakhadyr Kochkarov (Kyrgyzstan)
Fourth official:
Yuichi Nishimura (Japan)
Fifth official:
Toru Sagara (Japan)

=== Germany vs Spain ===
On 7 July 2010, Spain defeated Germany 1–0 in a rematch of the UEFA Euro 2008 Final (also won 1–0 by Spain) at the Moses Mabhida Stadium in Durban to progress to the World Cup Final against the Netherlands. It was the first time that Spain had ever gone through to the final of the World Cup, while it was the second consecutive World Cup in which Germany had lost in the semi-finals, having lost to Italy at home four years before.

Spain had the bulk of possession throughout the match, with Germany adopting a tight defensive structure. Germany created chances on the counter-attack, but Spain also went close to scoring on numerous occasions in each half. The match was deadlocked at 0–0 until the 73rd minute, when Spain was awarded a corner. The corner, taken by Xavi, was met by Carles Puyol, who headed the ball into the net as Manuel Neuer didn't do much to protect it to give Spain the lead. Thereafter, Spain protected its advantage and won the match.

After the match, Spain's coach Vicente del Bosque praised the "excellent performance" of his team, while Germany's coach Joachim Löw predicted that Spain would win the final.

7 July 2010
20:30

Germany	0–1	Spain
		Puyol 73'

Moses Mabhida Stadium, Durban
Attendance: 60,960
Referee: Viktor Kassai (Hungary)

Germany	Spain

GK	1	Manuel Neuer
RB	16	Philipp Lahm (c)
CB	3	Arne Friedrich
CB	17	Per Mertesacker
LB	20	Jérôme Boateng	(substituted off) 52'
DM	6	Sami Khedira	(substituted off) 81'
DM	7	Bastian Schweinsteiger
RW	15	Piotr Trochowski	(substituted off) 62'
AM	8	Mesut Özil
LW	10	Lukas Podolski
CF	11	Miroslav Klose
Substitutions:
DF	2	Marcell Jansen	(substituted on) 52'
MF	18	Toni Kroos	(substituted on) 62'
FW	23	Mario Gómez	(substituted on) 81'
Manager:
Joachim Löw

GK	1	Iker Casillas (c)
RB	15	Sergio Ramos
CB	3	Gerard Piqué
CB	5	Carles Puyol
LB	11	Joan Capdevila
DM	16	Sergio Busquets
DM	14	Xabi Alonso	(substituted off) 90+3'
RW	6	Andrés Iniesta
AM	8	Xavi
LW	18	Pedro	(substituted off) 86'
CF	7	David Villa	(substituted off) 81'
Substitutions:
FW	9	Fernando Torres	(substituted on) 81'
MF	21	David Silva	(substituted on) 86'
DF	4	Carlos Marchena	(substituted on) 90+3'
Manager:
Vicente del Bosque

Man of the Match:
Xavi (Spain)

Assistant referees:
Gábor Erős (Hungary)
Tibor Vámos (Hungary)
Fourth official:
Frank De Bleeckere (Belgium)
Fifth official:
Peter Hermans (Belgium)

== Match for third place ==
On 10 July 2010, at the Nelson Mandela Bay Stadium in Port Elizabeth, Germany defeated Uruguay 3–2 to claim third place at the World Cup for the second successive time after also finishing third at the 2006 FIFA World Cup. In the 19th minute, Bastian Schweinsteiger managed to take a shot towards the goal, which Muslera rebounded towards the onrushing Thomas Müller, who opened the scoring. Uruguay forced their way back into the match after Luis Suárez's pass put Edinson Cavani through on the left. He slid low into the far corner to put the South American side on level terms after 28 minutes. Diego Forlán then put them ahead six minutes into the second half with a beautiful side volley from the edge of the penalty box while goalkeeper Hans-Jörg Butt didn't move off his line. Marcell Jansen then scored on 56 minutes after Muslera came for Jérôme Boateng's cross but missed it right in front of Jansen, allowing him to head into an empty net. Mesut Özil took a corner in the 82nd minute, which reached a German player, bounced off him and went up to Khedira's head, who headed it in. Uruguay almost forced extra time when Forlán curled a 92nd-minute free kick onto the bar, but Germany held on to win the match. This was the eighth consecutive World Cup in which European teams finished third, stretching back to 1982.

After the game, Uruguay coach Óscar Tabárez insisted that his side did not deserve to be on the losing side: "We achieved an equal game against a real power, we could have won because in the game [they] were not superior to us ... We're not that far away [from Germany's level], the route has been marked, we must learn from this."

10 July 2010
20:30

Uruguay	2–3	Germany
Cavani 28'; Forlán 51'		Müller 19'; Jansen 56'; Khedira 82'

Nelson Mandela Bay Stadium, Port Elizabeth
Attendance: 36,254
Referee: Benito Archundia (Mexico)

Uruguay	Germany

GK	1	Fernando Muslera
RB	4	Jorge Fucile
CB	2	Diego Lugano (c)
CB	3	Diego Godín
LB	22	Martín Cáceres
CM	15	Diego Pérez	(yellow card) 61'	(substituted off) 77'
CM	17	Egidio Arévalo Ríos
RW	16	Maxi Pereira
LW	7	Edinson Cavani		(substituted off) 88'
CF	9	Luis Suárez
CF	10	Diego Forlán
Substitutions:
MF	5	Walter Gargano		(substituted on) 77'
FW	13	Sebastián Abreu		(substituted on) 88'
Manager:
Óscar Tabárez

GK	22	Hans-Jörg Butt
RB	20	Jérôme Boateng
CB	3	Arne Friedrich	(yellow card) 90+2'
CB	17	Per Mertesacker
LB	4	Dennis Aogo	(yellow card) 5'
DM	6	Sami Khedira
DM	7	Bastian Schweinsteiger (c)
RW	13	Thomas Müller
AM	8	Mesut Özil		(substituted off) 90+1'
LW	2	Marcell Jansen		(substituted off) 81'
CF	19	Cacau	(yellow card) 7'	(substituted off) 73'
Substitutions:
FW	9	Stefan Kießling		(substituted on) 73'
MF	18	Toni Kroos		(substituted on) 81'
DF	5	Serdar Tasci		(substituted on) 90+1'
Manager:
Joachim Löw

Man of the Match:
Thomas Müller (Germany)

Assistant referees:
Héctor Vergara (Canada)
Marvin Torrentera (Mexico)
Fourth official:
Marco Rodríguez (Mexico)
Fifth official:
José Luis Camargo (Mexico)

== Final ==
11 July 2010
20:30

Netherlands	0–1 (a.e.t.)	Spain
		Iniesta 116'

Soccer City, Johannesburg
Attendance: 84,490
Referee: Howard Webb (England)

Netherlands	Spain

GK	1	Maarten Stekelenburg
RB	2	Gregory van der Wiel	(yellow card) 111'
CB	3	John Heitinga	(yellow card) 57' (yellow-red card) 109'
CB	4	Joris Mathijsen	(yellow card) 117'
LB	5	Giovanni van Bronckhorst (c)	(yellow card) 54'	(substituted off) 105'
CM	6	Mark van Bommel	(yellow card) 22'
CM	8	Nigel de Jong	(yellow card) 28'	(substituted off) 99'
RW	11	Arjen Robben	(yellow card) 84'
AM	10	Wesley Sneijder
LW	7	Dirk Kuyt		(substituted off) 71'
CF	9	Robin van Persie	(yellow card) 15'
Substitutions:
MF	17	Eljero Elia		(substituted on) 71'
MF	23	Rafael van der Vaart		(substituted on) 99'
DF	15	Edson Braafheid		(substituted on) 105'
Manager:
Bert van Marwijk

GK	1	Iker Casillas (c)
RB	15	Sergio Ramos	(yellow card) 23'
CB	3	Gerard Piqué
CB	5	Carles Puyol	(yellow card) 16'
LB	11	Joan Capdevila	(yellow card) 67'
DM	16	Sergio Busquets
DM	14	Xabi Alonso		(substituted off) 87'
CM	8	Xavi	(yellow card) 120+1'
RW	6	Andrés Iniesta	(yellow card) 118'
LW	18	Pedro		(substituted off) 60'
CF	7	David Villa		(substituted off) 106'
Substitutions:
MF	22	Jesús Navas		(substituted on) 60'
MF	10	Cesc Fàbregas		(substituted on) 87'
FW	9	Fernando Torres		(substituted on) 106'
Manager:
Vicente del Bosque

Man of the Match:
Andrés Iniesta (Spain)

Assistant referees:
Darren Cann (England)
Michael Mullarkey (England)
Fourth official:
Yuichi Nishimura (Japan)
Fifth official:
Toru Sagara (Japan)
