= 2010 FIFA World Cup Group C =

Group C of the 2010 FIFA World Cup began on 12 June and ended on 23 June 2010. The group consisted of national association football teams from England, the United States, Algeria and Slovenia. The United States and England progressed to the round of 16 undefeated. The United States won the group, winning one match and drawing two. England had an identical record and goal difference but the United States finished top having scored more goals than England. Slovenia finished the group third having won a game, with Algeria finishing fourth with a single point.

Only England and the United States had previously met at a World Cup in 1950, when the United States defeated England 1–0.

== Teams ==
The teams were decided by World Cup draw that took place on 4 December 2009. The group was set to receive one team from each pot, which sorted all World Cup teams by position on the FIFA World Rankings as of October 2009.

The first team drawn was England, which secured qualification as a pot one team by winning Group 6 of UEFA qualification. The United States finished top of the CONCACAF fourth round group. The pot 3 team was Algeria who qualified for the World Cup for the first time since 1986 thanks to a one-off play-off win against Egypt. The play-off tie was played in Khartoum after the two sides finished level with each other in Group C. Post-match, a diplomatic spat occurred between the two nations with Egypt later threatening to quit international football for two years due to the alleged behaviour of Algerian fans. There were also violent demonstrations in Cairo near the Algerian embassy. The final team was Slovenia who finished second in Group 3 of UEFA qualification, two points behind Slovakia. In the subsequent play-offs, Slovenia defeated Russia in a two-legged tie to qualify for the finals.

England were considered favourites to win Group C. In a pre-tournament preview, The Guardian's Kevin McCarra analysed England's chances ahead of the tournament: "If Wayne Rooney stayed fit, if Steven Gerrard got his form back and if the centre-backs were in rude health, England would present a severe problem to most. Capello needs to refresh a dynamism that has waned. Semi-finalists." The Guardian previewed the US' chances: "The USA have been quietly optimistic about their chances of making a splash in South Africa ever since reaching the Confederations Cup final last year, where they lost to Brazil. They are confident of making it out of what is perceived to be a weak group and believe they can challenge England for first place."

FIFA World Cup Group C draw
Draw position	Team	Pot	Confederation	Method of qualification	Date of qualification	Finals appearance	Last appearance	Previous best performance	FIFA Rankings	
Draw position	Team	Pot	Confederation	Method of qualification	Date of qualification	Finals appearance	Last appearance	Previous best performance	October 2009 (Note: The rankings of October 2009 were used for seeding for the final draw.)	May 2010
C1	England	1	UEFA	UEFA Group 6 winners	9 September 2009	13th	2006	Winners (1966)	7	8
C2	United States	2	CONCACAF	CONCACAF fourth round winners	10 October 2009	9th	2006	Third place (1930)	11	14
C3	Algeria	3	CAF	CAF third round Group C winners	18 November 2009	3rd	1986	Group stage (1982, 1986)	29	30
C4	Slovenia	4	UEFA	UEFA play-off winners	18 November 2009	2nd	2002	Group stage (2002)	49	25

== Standings ==
Pos	Team	Pld	W	D	L	GF	GA	GD	Pts	Qualification
1	United States	3	1	2	0	4	3	+1	5	Advance to knockout stage
2	England	3	1	2	0	2	1	+1	5	Advance to knockout stage
3	Slovenia	3	1	1	1	3	3	0	4	
4	Algeria	3	0	1	2	0	2	−2	1	

Source: FIFA
Rules for classification: Tie-breaking criteria
- The United States advanced to play Ghana (runners-up of Group D) in the round of 16.
- England advanced to play Germany (winners of Group D) in the round of 16.

== Matches ==
Matches took place between 12 June and 23 June 2010. All times listed are local, UTC+2.

=== England vs United States ===
The opening match of group C was contested between England and the United States. The two sides had previously played each other nine times with England winning on seven occasions and the United States on two. The teams had previously played each other once in the FIFA World Cup in 1950. The USA won 1–0 in one of the biggest World Cup shock results of all time.

England took an early lead, Emile Heskey played a through ball to Steven Gerrard who slid the ball under Tim Howard in the 4th minute. However, the Three Lions failed to build on their lead, with the U.S. having plenty of possession in the first half. The United States equalised in the 40th minute when a seemingly harmless pot shot by Clint Dempsey was mishandled by England goalkeeper Robert Green and rolled into the net. Early in the second half, Heskey was played through on goal but could only shoot straight at Tim Howard. After several missed half-chances from England, Jozy Altidore forced a save onto the post from Green, highlighting England's lack of pace in central defence. Post-match, the U.S.' manager Bob Bradley was full of praise for his team's performance.

12 June 2010
20:30

England	1–1	United States
Gerrard 4'		Dempsey 40'

Royal Bafokeng Stadium, Rustenburg
Attendance: 38,646
Referee: Carlos Simon (Brazil)

England	United States

GK	12	Robert Green
RB	2	Glen Johnson
CB	6	John Terry
CB	20	Ledley King		(substituted off) 46'
LB	3	Ashley Cole
RM	7	Aaron Lennon
CM	8	Frank Lampard
CM	4	Steven Gerrard (c)	(yellow card) 61'
LM	16	James Milner	(yellow card) 26'	(substituted off) 31'
SS	10	Wayne Rooney
CF	21	Emile Heskey		(substituted off) 79'
Substitutions:
MF	17	Shaun Wright-Phillips		(substituted on) 31'
DF	18	Jamie Carragher	(yellow card) 60'	(substituted on) 46'
FW	9	Peter Crouch		(substituted on) 79'
Manager:
(Italy) Fabio Capello

GK	1	Tim Howard
RB	6	Steve Cherundolo	(yellow card) 39'
CB	15	Jay DeMerit	(yellow card) 47'
CB	5	Oguchi Onyewu
LB	3	Carlos Bocanegra (c)
RM	8	Clint Dempsey
CM	4	Michael Bradley
CM	13	Ricardo Clark
LM	10	Landon Donovan
CF	17	Jozy Altidore		(substituted off) 86'
CF	20	Robbie Findley	(yellow card) 74'	(substituted off) 77'
Substitutions:
FW	14	Edson Buddle		(substituted on) 77'
MF	11	Stuart Holden		(substituted on) 86'
Manager:
Bob Bradley

Man of the Match:
Tim Howard (United States)

Assistant referees:
Altemir Hausmann (Brazil)
Roberto Braatz (Brazil)
Fourth official:
Eddy Maillet (Seychelles)
Fifth official:
Evarist Menkouande (Cameroon)

=== Algeria vs Slovenia ===
The following day, Algeria met Slovenia in Polokwane. There were few chances created throughout the first half. However, in the 72nd minute, Algeria's substitute Abdelkader Ghezzal was dismissed for the accumulation of two yellow cards, the second being a handball. Seven minutes later, Slovenia's talisman Robert Koren scored the winning goal from 20 yards.

13 June 2010
13:30

Algeria	0–1	Slovenia
		Koren 79'

Peter Mokaba Stadium, Polokwane
Attendance: 30,325
Referee: Carlos Batres (Guatemala)

Algeria	Slovenia

GK	16	Faouzi Chaouchi
RB	4	Antar Yahia (c)
CB	2	Madjid Bougherra
CB	5	Rafik Halliche
LB	3	Nadir Belhadj
RM	8	Mehdi Lacen
CM	15	Karim Ziani
LM	19	Hassan Yebda	(yellow card) 90+5'
RW	21	Foued Kadir		(substituted off) 82'
LW	13	Karim Matmour		(substituted off) 81'
CF	11	Rafik Djebbour		(substituted off) 58'
Substitutions:
FW	9	Abdelkader Ghezzal	(yellow card) 59' (yellow-red card) 73'	(substituted on) 58'
FW	10	Rafik Saïfi		(substituted on) 81'
MF	17	Adlène Guedioura		(substituted on) 82'
Manager:
Rabah Saâdane

GK	1	Samir Handanović
RB	2	Mišo Brečko
CB	4	Marko Šuler
CB	5	Boštjan Cesar
LB	13	Bojan Jokić
RM	17	Andraž Kirm
CM	8	Robert Koren (c)
CM	18	Aleksandar Radosavljević	(yellow card) 35'	(substituted off) 87'
LM	10	Valter Birsa		(substituted off) 84'
SS	14	Zlatko Dedić		(substituted off) 53'
CF	11	Milivoje Novaković
Substitutions:
FW	9	Zlatan Ljubijankić		(substituted on) 53'
FW	7	Nejc Pečnik		(substituted on) 84'
MF	20	Andrej Komac	(yellow card) 90+3'	(substituted on) 87'
Manager:
Matjaž Kek

Man of the Match:
Robert Koren (Slovenia)

Assistant referees:
Leonel Leal (Costa Rica)
Carlos Pastrana (Honduras)
Fourth official:
Peter O'Leary (New Zealand)
Fifth official:
Brent Best (New Zealand)

=== Slovenia vs United States ===
In the second round of matches, Slovenia met the U.S. in Johannesburg. Slovenia went into half time with a 2–0 lead. Valter Birsa opened the scoring for Slovenia in an impressive fashion, collecting the ball from 25 yards out before curling the ball into the left-hand corner. After a dominant start from the Slovenians, the United States began to create some chances to equalise. However, on the counter-attack, Milivoje Novaković played a through ball to Zlatan Ljubijankić who managed to slot the ball under Tim Howard for their second goal. In response, the U.S.' manager made a double substitution at half time. In the opening stages of the second half, the United States halved the deficit via Landon Donovan after Boštjan Cesar had missed the flight of a long ball; Donovan then managed to collect the ball and hit his shot into the roof of the net from a tight angle. With eight minutes remaining, a long ball for the U.S. was knocked down by Joze Altidore to the oncoming Michael Bradley who finished past Samir Handanović on the half-volley to equalise the match at 2–2. The United States had looked as if they had won the match after a Donovan free-kick was turned in by Maurice Edu. However, the referee controversially disallowed the goal. Post-match, Bob Bradley said that he had no doubt that the referee had got the decision wrong.

18 June 2010
16:00

Slovenia	2–2	United States
Birsa 13'; Ljubijankić 42'		Donovan 48'; Bradley 82'

Ellis Park Stadium, Johannesburg
Attendance: 45,573
Referee: Koman Coulibaly (Mali)

Slovenia	United States

GK	1	Samir Handanović
RB	2	Mišo Brečko
CB	4	Marko Šuler	(yellow card) 69'
CB	5	Boštjan Cesar	(yellow card) 35'
LB	13	Bojan Jokić	(yellow card) 75'
CM	8	Robert Koren (c)
CM	18	Aleksandar Radosavljević
RW	10	Valter Birsa		(substituted off) 87'
LW	17	Andraž Kirm	(yellow card) 72'
CF	9	Zlatan Ljubijankić		(substituted off) 74'
CF	11	Milivoje Novaković
Substitutions:
FW	7	Nejc Pečnik		(substituted on) 74'	(substituted off) 90+4'
FW	14	Zlatko Dedić		(substituted on) 87'
MF	20	Andrej Komac		(substituted on) 90+4'
Manager:
Matjaž Kek

GK	1	Tim Howard
RB	6	Steve Cherundolo
CB	15	Jay DeMerit
CB	5	Oguchi Onyewu		(substituted off) 80'
LB	3	Carlos Bocanegra (c)
RM	10	Landon Donovan
CM	16	José Francisco Torres		(substituted off) 46'
CM	4	Michael Bradley
LM	8	Clint Dempsey
CF	17	Jozy Altidore
CF	20	Robbie Findley	(yellow card) 40'	(substituted off) 46'
Substitutions:
MF	22	Benny Feilhaber		(substituted on) 46'
MF	19	Maurice Edu		(substituted on) 46'
FW	9	Herculez Gomez		(substituted on) 80'
Manager:
Bob Bradley

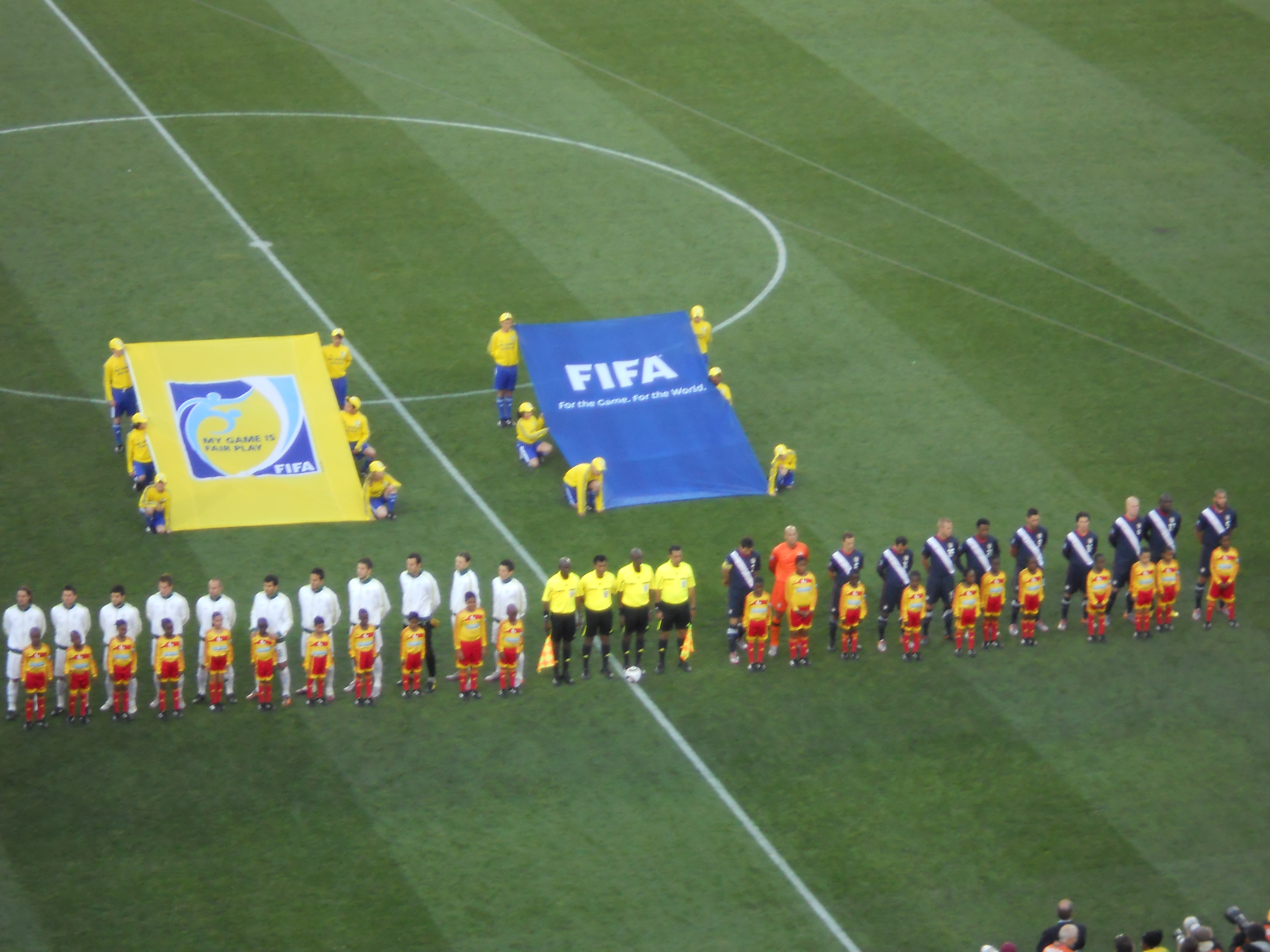
The Slovenia and United States teams line up for the national anthems before the game

Man of the Match:
Landon Donovan (United States)

Assistant referees:
Redouane Achik (Morocco)
Inácio Cândido (Angola)
Fourth official:
Subkhiddin Mohd Salleh (Malaysia)
Fifth official:
Jeffrey Goh Gek Pheng (Singapore)

=== England vs Algeria ===
Prior to the match, England manager Fabio Capello took the decision to drop goalkeeper Rob Green following his high-profile error against the United States, replacing him with David James. Algeria also opted to change their goalkeeper with Raïs M'Bolhi replacing Faouzi Chaouchi.

The match finished goalless after few chances were created by either side and with Algeria often seeming more comfortable in possession. As England left the pitch, Wayne Rooney was heard on camera saying "Nice to see your own fans booing you." which he later apologised for. Writing for Sky Sports, James Dall described England's performance as unimaginative and nervy.

18 June 2010
20:30

England	0–0	Algeria

Cape Town Stadium, Cape Town
Attendance: 64,100
Referee: Ravshan Irmatov (Uzbekistan)

England	Algeria

GK	1	David James
RB	2	Glen Johnson
CB	18	Jamie Carragher	(yellow card) 58'
CB	6	John Terry
LB	3	Ashley Cole
RM	7	Aaron Lennon		(substituted off) 63'
CM	14	Gareth Barry		(substituted off) 84'
CM	8	Frank Lampard
LM	4	Steven Gerrard (c)
SS	10	Wayne Rooney
CF	21	Emile Heskey		(substituted off) 74'
Substitutions:
MF	17	Shaun Wright-Phillips		(substituted on) 63'
FW	19	Jermain Defoe		(substituted on) 74'
FW	9	Peter Crouch		(substituted on) 84'
Manager:
(Italy) Fabio Capello

GK	23	Raïs M'Bolhi
CB	2	Madjid Bougherra
CB	5	Rafik Halliche
CB	4	Antar Yahia (c)
RM	21	Foued Kadir
CM	19	Hassan Yebda		(substituted off) 88'
CM	8	Mehdi Lacen	(yellow card) 85'
LM	3	Nadir Belhadj
AM	7	Ryad Boudebouz		(substituted off) 74'
AM	15	Karim Ziani		(substituted off) 81'
CF	13	Karim Matmour
Substitutions:
MF	22	Djamel Abdoun		(substituted on) 74'
MF	17	Adlène Guedioura		(substituted on) 81'
DF	20	Djamel Mesbah		(substituted on) 88'
Manager:
Rabah Saâdane

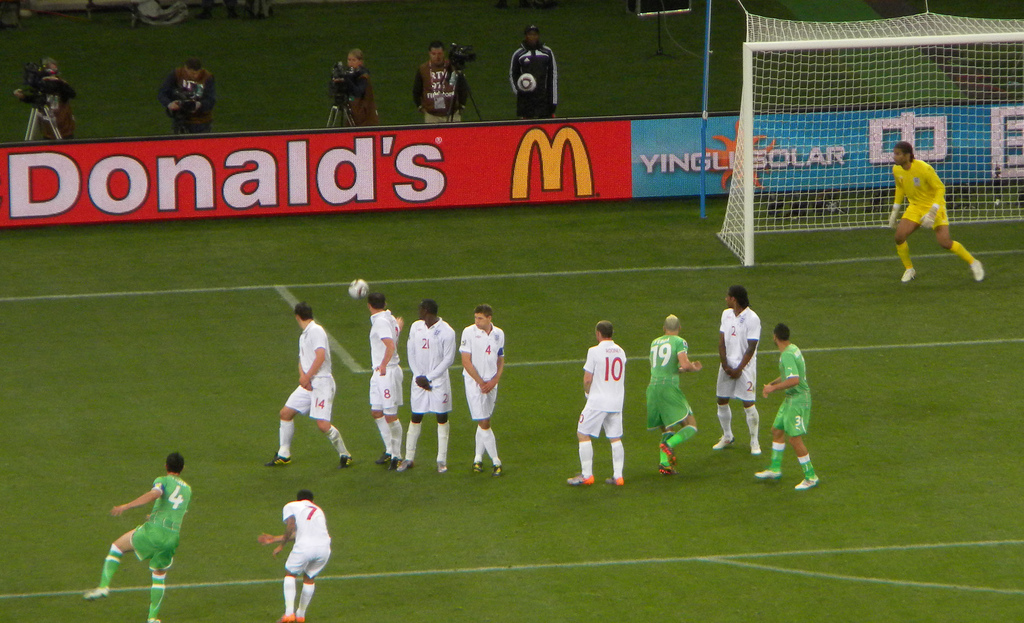
England vs Algeria

Man of the Match:
Ashley Cole (England)

Assistant referees:
Rafael Ilyasov (Uzbekistan)
Bakhadyr Kochkarov (Kyrgyzstan)
Fourth official:
Michael Hester (New Zealand)
Fifth official:
Jan Hendrik Hintz (New Zealand)

=== Slovenia vs England ===
Jermain Defoe's 23rd-minute goal allowed England to claim the win and progress to the knockout stage of the competition. After the goal, England created several more chances but were unable to add to their lead.

23 June 2010
16:00

Slovenia	0–1	England
		Defoe 23'

Nelson Mandela Bay Stadium, Port Elizabeth
Attendance: 36,893
Referee: Wolfgang Stark (Germany)

Slovenia	England

GK	1	Samir Handanović
RB	2	Mišo Brečko
CB	4	Marko Šuler
CB	5	Boštjan Cesar
LB	13	Bojan Jokić	(yellow card) 40'
CM	8	Robert Koren (c)
CM	18	Aleksandar Radosavljević
RW	10	Valter Birsa	(yellow card) 79'
LW	17	Andraž Kirm		(substituted off) 79'
CF	9	Zlatan Ljubijankić		(substituted off) 62'
CF	11	Milivoje Novaković
Substitutions:
FW	14	Zlatko Dedić	(yellow card) 81'	(substituted on) 62'
FW	23	Tim Matavž		(substituted on) 79'
Manager:
Matjaž Kek

GK	1	David James
RB	2	Glen Johnson	(yellow card) 48'
CB	15	Matthew Upson
CB	6	John Terry
LB	3	Ashley Cole
RM	4	Steven Gerrard (c)
CM	8	Frank Lampard
CM	14	Gareth Barry
LM	16	James Milner
SS	19	Jermain Defoe		(substituted off) 86'
CF	10	Wayne Rooney		(substituted off) 72'
Substitutions:
MF	11	Joe Cole		(substituted on) 72'
FW	21	Emile Heskey		(substituted on) 86'
Manager:
(Italy) Fabio Capello

Man of the Match:
James Milner (England)

Assistant referees:
Jan-Hendrik Salver (Germany)
Mike Pickel (Germany)
Fourth official:
Joel Aguilar (El Salvador)
Fifth official:
William Torres (El Salvador)

=== United States vs Algeria ===
Early in the game, the United States nearly allowed another early goal as an Algerian shot hit the crossbar. Throughout the remainder of the game, the United States had a number of good chances against a solid Algerian defence that allowed just one goal from two games; striker Jozy Altidore volleyed wide of an open net, while Clint Dempsey had a goal disallowed for a controversial offside call and later hit the crossbar on a shot and missed an empty net on the rebound. After 90 minutes of a scoreless affair, the United States were at risk of elimination: with England leading Slovenia 1–0, a 0–0 draw for the United States would have caused them to finish third in Group C on three points (behind England on five and Slovenia on four). However, in stoppage time, American goalkeeper Tim Howard quickly threw an outlet pass to Landon Donovan, who moved the ball up the pitch and passed the ball just outside the box to Altidore, who then crossed the ball to an open Dempsey in the middle of the box. With the Algerian goalkeeper closing in, Dempsey shot quickly and was blocked; however, Donovan followed the shot and put the rebound into the net for an easy goal. The United States held on for the final few minutes for a 1–0 victory. The late goal not only saved the United States from elimination but also allowed them to win their group for the first time since 1930, advancing to play Ghana in the round of 16.

23 June 2010
16:00

United States	1–0	Algeria
Donovan 90+1'

Loftus Versfeld Stadium, Pretoria
Attendance: 35,827
Referee: Frank De Bleeckere (Belgium)

United States	Algeria

GK	1	Tim Howard
RB	12	Jonathan Bornstein		(substituted off) 80'
CB	15	Jay DeMerit
CB	3	Carlos Bocanegra (c)
LB	6	Steve Cherundolo
CM	4	Michael Bradley
CM	19	Maurice Edu		(substituted off) 64'
RW	8	Clint Dempsey
LW	10	Landon Donovan
SS	17	Jozy Altidore	(yellow card) 62'
CF	9	Herculez Gomez		(substituted off) 46'
Substitutions:
MF	22	Benny Feilhaber		(substituted on) 46'
FW	14	Edson Buddle		(substituted on) 64'
MF	7	DaMarcus Beasley	(yellow card) 90'	(substituted on) 80'
Manager:
Bob Bradley

GK	23	Raïs M'Bolhi
CB	2	Madjid Bougherra
CB	5	Rafik Halliche
CB	4	Antar Yahia (c)	(yellow card) 76' (yellow-red card) 90+3'
RM	21	Foued Kadir
CM	19	Hassan Yebda	(yellow card) 12'
CM	8	Mehdi Lacen	(yellow card) 83'
LM	3	Nadir Belhadj
AM	13	Karim Matmour		(substituted off) 84'
AM	15	Karim Ziani		(substituted off) 69'
CF	11	Rafik Djebbour		(substituted off) 65'
Substitutions:
FW	9	Abdelkader Ghezzal		(substituted on) 65'
MF	17	Adlène Guedioura		(substituted on) 69'
FW	10	Rafik Saïfi		(substituted on) 84'
Manager:
Rabah Saâdane

Man of the Match:
Landon Donovan (United States)

Assistant referees:
Peter Hermans (Belgium)
Walter Vromans (Belgium)
Fourth official:
Subkhiddin Mohd Salleh (Malaysia)
Fifth official:
Mu Yuxin (China)

== See also ==
- Algeria at the FIFA World Cup
- England at the FIFA World Cup
- Slovenia at the FIFA World Cup
- United States at the FIFA World Cup
