= 2010 FIFA World Cup seeding =

Calculation of football teams before tournament

The draw for the 2010 FIFA World Cup occurred in Cape Town, South Africa, on 4 December 2009, at 19:00 local time (UTC+2). In preparation for the draw, the qualified teams were seeded and organised into pots.

== Seeding ==
The criteria for the seeding was released on 2 December and was, in contrast to previous World Cup seeding criteria, based solely upon the October 2009 FIFA World Rankings. Use of the most recent rankings prior to the draw (November 2009) was thought to unfairly benefit those nations who had played competitive fixtures in qualification playoffs during that month, at the expense of those who had already booked their place in the tournament.

The seven highest seeded teams according to the ranking criteria were placed in Pot 1, alongside the host nation South Africa (who were predetermined to be in Group A).

Association	FIFA Ranking October 2009
South Africa (hosts)	85
Brazil	1
Spain	2
Netherlands	3
Italy	4
Germany	5
Argentina	6
England	7
France	9
Portugal	10
United States	11
Switzerland	13
Cameroon	14
Greece	16
Chile	17
Mexico	18
Ivory Coast	19
Serbia	20
Paraguay	21
Australia	24
Uruguay	25
Denmark	27
Algeria	29
Nigeria	32
Slovakia	33
Honduras	35
Ghana	38
Japan	40
South Korea	48
Slovenia	49
New Zealand	83
North Korea	91

== The draw ==
Teams were organised into four pots of eight teams. The seeded teams were placed in Pot 1 and the remaining teams were placed into Pots 2–4 on a geographical basis, as below.

Pot 1 (Seeds)	Pot 2 (Asia, North America & Oceania)	Pot 3 (Africa & South America)	Pot 4 (Europe)
South Africa (hosts); Argentina; Brazil; England; Germany; Italy; Netherlands; Spain	Australia; Japan; North Korea; South Korea; Honduras; Mexico; United States; New Zealand	Algeria; Cameroon; Ghana; Ivory Coast; Nigeria; Chile; Paraguay; Uruguay	Denmark; France; Greece; Portugal; Serbia; Slovakia; Slovenia; Switzerland

The basic draw procedure was to draw out the pots starting from Pot 1. One team from each pot would be placed, in order of being drawn, into one of eight groups from A to H. After each team was allocated to a group, its position in the group was also drawn. This determined the team's placement in the predetermined fixture schedule. This was with the exception of the seeded teams, who were automatically placed in their group's Position 1.

In order to maintain geographical separation of teams, the basic draw procedure had to be modified for the drawing of Pot 3. No South American teams could be placed into Brazil or Argentina's groups, and no African team could be placed in South Africa's group. In order to accommodate this, the first two African teams drawn would be placed immediately into Brazil and Argentina's groups. South Africa's group (predetermined to be Group A) was to be left vacant until filled by the first South American team drawn. Beyond these considerations, the principle of filling from A to H applied.

In the event, the first two teams drawn from Pot 3 were Nigeria and Ivory Coast, who were placed in Argentina's Group B and Brazil's Group G respectively. Algeria were then placed in Group C so that a South American team, Uruguay, could be placed with South Africa in Group A.
