= European nations at the FIFA World Cup =

International football delegations

Association football is the most popular sport in nearly every European country, and UEFA, the governing body of European football, is one of the six continental confederations that constitute FIFA. UEFA contains 55 national association members, some of which are partially or entirely located in Asia. A total of 33 of the current members of UEFA have competed at the FIFA World Cup, while the defunct East Germany qualified once, in 1974.

European nations have won the FIFA World Cup a record 13 times, with Germany and Italy winning four times, France and Spain winning twice each, and England once. UEFA countries have hosted the finals eleven times.

Every edition of the tournament has had at least one European nation finishing in the top four.

== Overview ==
	1930 (Uruguay) (13)	1934 (Italy) (16)	1938 (France) (15)	1950 (Brazil) (13)	1954 (Switzerland) (16)	1958 (Sweden) (16)	1962 (Chile) (16)	1966 (England) (16)	1970 (Mexico) (16)	1974 (West Germany) (16)	1978 (Argentina) (16)	1982 (Spain) (24)	1986 (Mexico) (24)	1990 (Italy) (24)	1994 (United States) (24)	1998 (France) (32)	2002 (South Korea) (Japan) (32)	2006 (Germany) (32)	2010 (South Africa) (32)	2014 (Brazil) (32)	2018 (Russia) (32)	2022 (Qatar) (32)	2026 (Canada) (Mexico) (United States) (48)	2030 (Morocco) (Portugal) (Spain) (48)	2034 (Saudi Arabia) (48)	Total
Teams	(France) (Belgium) (Kingdom of Yugoslavia) (Romania)	(Germany) (Italy) (France) (Spain) (Belgium) (Sweden) (Switzerland) (Netherlands) (Czechoslovakia) (Hungary) (Austria) (Romania)	(Germany) (Italy) (France) (Belgium) (Sweden) (Switzerland) (Netherlands) (Czechoslovakia) (Hungary) (Poland) (Romania) (Norway)	(Italy) (Spain) (England) (Sweden) (Socialist Federal Republic of Yugoslavia) (Switzerland)	(West Germany) (Italy) (France) (England) (Belgium) (Socialist Federal Republic of Yugoslavia) (Switzerland) (Czechoslovakia) (Hungary) (Scotland) (Austria) (Turkey)	(West Germany) (France) (England) (Sweden) (Socialist Federal Republic of Yugoslavia) (Soviet Union) (Czechoslovakia) (Hungary) (Scotland) (Austria) (Northern Ireland) (Wales)	(West Germany) (Italy) (Spain) (England) (Socialist Federal Republic of Yugoslavia) (Switzerland) (Soviet Union) (Czechoslovakia) (Hungary) (People's Republic of Bulgaria)	(West Germany) (Italy) (France) (Spain) (England) (Switzerland) (Soviet Union) (Hungary) (Portugal) (People's Republic of Bulgaria)	(West Germany) (Italy) (England) (Belgium) (Sweden) (Soviet Union) (Czechoslovakia) (Bulgaria) (Romania)	(West Germany) (Italy) (Sweden) (Socialist Federal Republic of Yugoslavia) (Netherlands) (Poland) (Scotland) (People's Republic of Bulgaria) (East Germany)	(West Germany) (Italy) (France) (Spain) (Sweden) (Netherlands) (Hungary) (Poland) (Scotland) (Austria)	(West Germany) (Italy) (France) (Spain) (England) (Belgium) (Socialist Federal Republic of Yugoslavia) (Soviet Union) (Czechoslovakia) (Hungary) (Poland) (Scotland) (Austria) (Northern Ireland)	(West Germany) (Italy) (France) (Spain) (England) (Belgium) (Soviet Union) (Hungary) (Poland) (Portugal) (Scotland) (People's Republic of Bulgaria) (Denmark) (Northern Ireland)	(West Germany) (Italy) (Spain) (England) (Belgium) (Sweden) (Socialist Federal Republic of Yugoslavia) (Netherlands) (Soviet Union) (Czechoslovakia) (Scotland) (Austria) (Romania) (Republic of Ireland)	(Germany) (Italy) (Spain) (Belgium) (Sweden) (Switzerland) (Netherlands) (Russia) (Bulgaria) (Romania) (Norway) (Republic of Ireland) (Greece)	(Germany) (Italy) (France) (Spain) (England) (Belgium) (Federal Republic of Yugoslavia) (Netherlands) (Scotland) (Austria) (Croatia) (Bulgaria) (Romania) (Denmark) (Norway)	(Germany) (Italy) (France) (Spain) (England) (Belgium) (Sweden) (Russia) (Poland) (Portugal) (Croatia) (Denmark) (Turkey) (Republic of Ireland) (Slovenia)	(Germany) (Italy) (France) (Spain) (England) (Sweden) (Serbia and Montenegro) (Switzerland) (Netherlands) (Czech Republic) (Poland) (Portugal) (Croatia) (Ukraine)	(Germany) (Italy) (France) (Spain) (England) (Serbia) (Switzerland) (Netherlands) (Slovakia) (Portugal) (Denmark) (Greece) (Slovenia)	(Germany) (Italy) (France) (Spain) (England) (Belgium) (Switzerland) (Netherlands) (Russia) (Portugal) (Croatia) (Greece) (Bosnia and Herzegovina)	(Germany) (France) (Spain) (England) (Belgium) (Sweden) (Serbia) (Switzerland) (Russia) (Poland) (Portugal) (Croatia) (Denmark) (Iceland)	(Germany) (France) (Spain) (England) (Belgium) (Serbia) (Switzerland) (Netherlands) (Poland) (Portugal) (Croatia) (Denmark) (Wales)	(Germany) (France) (Spain) (England) (Belgium) (Sweden) (Switzerland) (Netherlands) (Czech Republic) (Portugal) (Scotland) (Austria) (Croatia) (Norway) (Turkey) (Bosnia and Herzegovina)	(Portugal) (Spain)		272
Top 32	—	—	—	—	—	—	—	—	—	—	—	—	—	—	—	—	—	—	—	—	—	—	13			13
Top 16	—	—	—	—	—	—	—	—	—	—	—	10 (Note: In 1982, the second round featured 12 teams of which 4 advanced to the semi-finals.)	10	10	10	10	9	10	6	6	10	8	7			106
Top 8	—	8	6	—	6	7	6	5	4	6	5	10	5	6	7	6	4	6	3	4	6	5	6			111
Top 4	1	4	3	2	3	3	2	4	2	3	2	4	3	3	3	3	2	4	3	2	4	2	3			65
Top 2	0	2	2	0	2	1	1	2	1	2	1	2	1	1	1	1	1	2	2	1	2	1	1			30
1st		(Italy)	(Italy)		(West Germany)			(England)		(West Germany)		(Italy)		(West Germany)		(France)		(Italy)	(Spain)	(Germany)	(France)		(Spain)			13
2nd		(Czechoslovakia)	(Hungary)		(Hungary)	(Sweden)	(Czechoslovakia)	(West Germany)	(Italy)	(Netherlands)	(Netherlands)	(West Germany)	(West Germany)		(Italy)		(Germany)	(France)	(Netherlands)		(Croatia)	(France)				17
3rd		(Germany)		(Sweden)	(Austria)	(France)		(Portugal)	(West Germany)	(Poland)		(Poland)	(France)	(Italy)	(Sweden)	(Croatia)	(Turkey)	(Germany)	(Germany)	(Netherlands)	(Belgium)	(Croatia)	(England)			19
4th	(Kingdom of Yugoslavia)	(Austria)	(Sweden)	(Spain)		(West Germany)	(Socialist Federal Republic of Yugoslavia)	(Soviet Union)			(Italy)	(France)	(Belgium)	(England)	(Bulgaria)	(Netherlands)		(Portugal)			(England)		(France)			16

Team	No.	Years	Best result
**Germany** (Note: Germany (since 1949 officially the Federal Republic of Germany) is since 1904 represented by the same governing body (Deutscher Fußball-Bund (DFB)). After World War II and the division of Germany, the DFB was only re-admitted to FIFA after the 1950 WC, while Saar (until 1956) and East Germany (until 1990) fielded teams of their own before (re-)joining (West) Germany and the DFB in the German reunification. FIFA officially attributes all international results of the DFB team since 1908 to Germany, including the results of 1954–1990, when the team was often called West Germany.)	21	1934, 1938, **1954**, 1958, 1962, 1966, 1970, **1974**, 1978, 1982, 1986, **1990**, 1994, 1998, 2002, 2006, 2010, **2014**, 2018, 2022, 2026	1st
**Italy**	18	**1934**, **1938**, 1950, 1954, 1962, 1966, 1970, 1974, 1978, **1982**, 1986, 1990, 1994, 1998, 2002, **2006**, 2010, 2014	1st
**France**	17	1930, 1934, 1938, 1954, 1958, 1966, 1978, 1982, 1986, **1998**, 2002, 2006, 2010, 2014, **2018**, 2022, 2026	1st
**Spain**	17	1934, 1950, 1962, 1966, 1978, 1982, 1986, 1990, 1994, 1998, 2002, 2006, **2010**, 2014, 2018, 2022, **2026**	1st
**England**	17	1950, 1954, 1958, 1962, **1966**, 1970, 1982, 1986, 1990, 1998, 2002, 2006, 2010, 2014, 2018, 2022, 2026	1st
**Belgium**	15	1930, 1934, 1938, 1954, 1970, 1982, 1986, 1990, 1994, 1998, 2002, 2014, **2018**, 2022, 2026	3rd
**Sweden**	13	1934, 1938, 1950, **1958**, 1970, 1974, 1978, 1990, 1994, 2002, 2006, 2018, 2026	2nd
**Serbia** (Note: The Kingdom of Yugoslavia (1930) and the Socialist Federal Republic of Yugoslavia (1950–1990) qualified eight times from 1930–1990 under the name Yugoslavia prior to its breakup by the secession of many of its constituent republics in 1992. The Federal Republic of Yugoslavia qualified once in 1998 under the name Yugoslavia, and Serbia and Montenegro qualified once in 2006 after a name change in 2003. All these teams are considered the predecessor of the current Serbia team by FIFA. The other national teams which resulted from the breakup of the original Yugoslavia – Croatia, Slovenia, Bosnia-Herzegovina, and Macedonia – are considered distinct entities from the Yugoslavia team of 1930–1990. Montenegro and Kosovo now also compete separately after independence in 2006 and 2008, respectively. In 2010, Serbia debuted at the FIFA World Cup with their own national team.)	13	**1930**, 1950, 1954, 1958, **1962**, 1974, 1982, 1990, 1998, 2006, 2010, 2018, 2022	4th
**Switzerland**	13	**1934**, **1938**, 1950, **1954**, 1962, 1966, 1994, 2006, 2010, 2014, 2018, 2022, **2026**	QF
**Netherlands**	12	1934, 1938, **1974**, **1978**, 1990, 1994, 1998, 2006, **2010**, 2014, 2022, 2026	2nd
**Russia** (Note: The Soviet Union qualified seven times prior to being dissolved in 1991. The 15 nations that were former Soviet Republics now compete separately. FIFA considers Russia as the successor team of the USSR.)	11	1958, 1962, **1966**, 1970, 1982, 1986, 1990, 1994, 2002, 2014, 2018	4th
**Czech Republic** (Note: Czechoslovakia qualified eight times prior to being divided into Slovakia and the Czech Republic in 1993. FIFA considers both the Czech Republic and Slovakia as the successor team of Czechoslovakia. As an independent nation, the Czech Republic national team qualified for the World Cup for the first time as a separate nation in 2006, with Slovakia doing the same in 2010.)	10	**1934**, 1938, 1954, 1958, **1962**, 1970, 1982, 1990, 2006, 2026	2nd
**Slovakia**	9	**1934**, 1938, 1954, 1958, **1962**, 1970, 1982, 1990, 2010	2nd
**Hungary**	9	1934, **1938**, **1954**, 1958, 1962, 1966, 1978, 1982, 1986	2nd
**Poland**	9	1938, **1974**, 1978, **1982**, 1986, 2002, 2006, 2018, 2022	3rd
**Portugal**	9	**1966**, 1986, 2002, 2006, 2010, 2014, 2018, 2022, 2026	3rd
**Scotland**	9	1954, 1958, 1974, 1978, 1982, 1986, 1990, 1998, 2026	GS
**Austria**	8	1934, **1954**, 1958, 1978, 1982, 1990, 1998, 2026	3rd
**Croatia**	7	1998, 2002, 2006, 2014, **2018**, 2022, 2026	2nd
**Bulgaria**	7	1962, 1966, 1970, 1974, 1986, **1994**, 1998	4th
**Romania**	7	1930, 1934, 1938, 1970, 1990, **1994**, 1998	QF
**Denmark**	6	1986, **1998**, 2002, 2010, 2018, 2022	QF
**Norway**	4	1938, 1994, 1998, **2026**	QF
**Turkey**	3	1954, **2002**, 2026	3rd
**Northern Ireland**	3	**1958**, 1982, 1986	QF
**Republic of Ireland**	3	**1990**, 1994, 2002	QF
**Greece**	3	1994, 2010, **2014**	R16
**Wales**	2	**1958**, 2022	QF
**Slovenia**	2	2002, 2010	GS
**Bosnia and Herzegovina**	2	2014, **2026**	R32
**Ukraine**	1	**2006**	QF
**East Germany**	1	**1974**	GS2
**Iceland**	1	2018	GS
**Israel** (Note: Israel qualified in 1970 as a member of AFC. They were expelled from AFC in 1974 and joined UEFA in 1994.)	1	(1970)	GS

- **Bold** indicates year(s) of best finish

== Results ==
=== Tournament standings ===
Performance of each nation
Team	Champions	Final	Semi-finals	Quarter-finals (Note: Knockout round of 8: 1934–1938, 1954–1970, and 1986–present; second group stage, top 8: 1974–1978)	Round of 16 (Note: Second group stage, top 12: 1982; knockout round of 16: 1986–present)	Round of 32 (Note: Knockout round of 32: 2026–present)
Germany	4	8	13	17	9	1
Italy	4	6	8	8	7	0
France	2	4	8	10	8	1
Spain	2	2	3	6	10	1
England	1	1	4	11	10	1
Netherlands	0	3	5	7	7	1
Hungary	0	2	2	5	0	0
Czech Republic	0	2	2	4	1	0
Slovakia	0	2	2	4	1	0
Sweden	0	1	4	6	4	1
Croatia	0	1	3	3	3	1
Serbia	0	0	2	5	2	0
Belgium	0	0	2	4	8	1
Portugal	0	0	2	3	4	1
Austria	0	0	2	3	1	1
Poland	0	0	2	2	3	0
Russia	0	0	1	5	3	0
Bulgaria	0	0	1	1	2	0
Turkey	0	0	1	1	1	0
Switzerland	0	0	0	4	6	1
Denmark	0	0	0	1	4	0
Republic of Ireland	0	0	0	1	3	0
Romania	0	0	0	1	3	0
Norway	0	0	0	1	2	1
Northern Ireland	0	0	0	1	1	0
Ukraine	0	0	0	1	1	0
East Germany	0	0	0	1	—N/a	
Wales	0	0	0	1	0	0
Greece	0	0	0	0	1	0
Bosnia and Herzegovina	0	0	0	0	0	1

=== Team results by tournament ===
The team ranking in each tournament is according to FIFA. The rankings, apart from the top four positions (top two in 1930), are not a result of direct competition between the teams; instead, teams eliminated in the same round are ranked by their full results in the tournament.

For each tournament, the number of teams in each finals tournament (in brackets) are shown.

FIFA World Cup results of UEFA members
Team	1930 (Uruguay) (13)	1934 (Italy) (16)	1938 (France) (15)	1950 (Brazil) (13)	1954 (Switzerland) (16)	1958 (Sweden) (16)	1962 (Chile) (16)	1966 (England) (16)	1970 (Mexico) (16)	1974 (West Germany) (16)	1978 (Argentina) (16)	1982 (Spain) (24)	1986 (Mexico) (24)	1990 (Italy) (24)	1994 (United States) (24)	1998 (France) (32)	2002 (South Korea) (Japan) (32)	2006 (Germany) (32)	2010 (South Africa) (32)	2014 (Brazil) (32)	2018 (Russia) (32)	2022 (Qatar) (32)	2026 (Canada) (Mexico) (United States) (48)	2030 (Morocco) (Portugal) (Spain) (48)	2034 (Saudi Arabia) (48)	Total (up to 2026)	Qual. Comp.
Austria		4th	•• (Note: Austria qualified in 1938, but withdrew to play as part of Germany after being annexed.)	×	3rd	GS; 15th		•	•	•	GS2; 7th	GS2; 8th	•	GS; T-18th	•	GS; 23rd	•	•	•	•	•	•	R32; 28th	TBD	TBD	8	20
Belgium	GS; 11th	R16; 15th	R16; 13th	×	GS; 12th	•	•	•	GS; T-10th	•	•	GS2; 10th	4th	R16; 11th	R16; 11th	GS; 19th	R16; 14th	•	•	QF; 6th	3rd	GS; 23rd	QF; 6th	TBD	TBD	15	22
Bosnia and Herzegovina	Part of Yugoslavia														—N/a	•	•	•	•	GS; 20th	•	•	R32; 29th	TBD	TBD	2	8
Bulgaria		•×	•		•	•	GS; 15th	GS; 15th	GS; 13th	GS1; 12th	•	•	R16; 15th	•	4th	GS; 29th	•	•	•	•	•	•	•	TBD	TBD	7	21
Croatia	Part of Yugoslavia														—N/a	3rd	GS; 23rd	GS; 22nd	•	GS; 19th	2nd	3rd	R32; 20th	TBD	TBD	7	8
Czech Republic		2nd	QF; 5th		GS; 14th	GS; 9th	2nd	•	GS; 15th	•	•	GS1; 19th	•	QF; 6th	•	•	•	GS; 20th	•	•	•	•	GS; 39th	TBD	TBD	10	21
Denmark						•		•	•	•	•	•	R16; 9th	•	•	QF; 8th	R16; 10th	•	GS; 24th	•	R16; 11th	GS; 28th	•	TBD	TBD	6	17
East Germany	Part of Germany			—N/a		•	•	•	•	GS2; 6th	•	•	•	•	Part of Germany											1	9
England	—N/a			GS; 8th	QF; 6th	GS; 11th	QF; 8th	1st	QF; 8th	•	•	GS2; 6th	QF; 8th	4th	•	R16; 9th	QF; 6th	QF; 7th	R16; 13th	GS; 26th	4th	QF; 6th	3rd	TBD	TBD	17	20
France	GS; 7th	R16; T-9th	QF; 6th	•	GS; 11th	3rd	•	GS; T-13th	•	•	GS1; 12th	4th	3rd	•	•	1st	GS; 28th	2nd	GS; 29th	QF; 7th	1st	2nd	4th	TBD	TBD	17	23
Germany		3rd	R16; 10th		1st	4th	QF; 7th	2nd	3rd	1st	GS2; 6th	2nd	2nd	1st	QF; 5th	QF; 7th	2nd	3rd	3rd	1st	GS; 22nd	GS; 17th	R32; 18th	TBD	TBD	21	21
Greece		•×	•		•	•	•	•	•	•	•	•	•	•	GS; 24th	•	•	•	GS; 25th	R16; 13th	•	•	•	TBD	TBD	3	21
Hungary		QF; 6th	2nd		2nd	GS; 10th	QF; 5th	QF; 6th	•	•	GS1; 15th	GS1; 14th	GS; 18th	•	•	•	•	•	•	•	•	•	•	TBD	TBD	9	21
Iceland	—N/a				×	•				•	•	•	•	•	•	•	•	•	•	•	GS; 28th	•	•	TBD	TBD	1	15
Israel (Note: Israel competed as Eretz Yisrael (Land of Israel) in 1934 and in 1938, with a team consisting exclusively of Jewish and British footballers from the Palestine Mandate.)		•	•	•	•	•	•	•	GS; 12th	•	•	•	•	•	•	•	•	•	•	•	•	•	•	TBD	TBD	1	22
Israel		•	•	•	•	member of AFC				OFC		•	OFC		•	•	•	•	•	•	•	•	•	TBD	TBD	1	22
Italy		1st	1st	GS; 7th	GS; 10th	•	GS; 9th	GS; 9th	2nd	GS1; 10th	4th	1st	R16; 12th	3rd	2nd	QF; 5th	R16; 15th	1st	GS; 26th	GS; 22nd	•	•	•	TBD	TBD	18	22
Netherlands		R16; T-9th	R16; 14th			•	•	•	•	2nd	2nd	•	•	R16; 15th	QF; 7th	4th	•	R16; 11th	2nd	3rd	•	QF; 5th	R32; 17th	TBD	TBD	12	20
Northern Ireland	—N/a			•	•	QF; 8th	•	•	•	•	•	GS2; 9th	GS; 21st	•	•	•	•	•	•	•	•	•	•	TBD	TBD	3	20
Norway			R16; 12th		•	•	•	•	•	•	•	•	•	•	GS; 17th	R16; 15th	•	•	•	•	•	•	QF; 5th	TBD	TBD	4	20
Poland		•×	R16; 11th		×	•	•	•	•	3rd	GS2; 5th	3rd	R16; 14th	•	•	•	GS; 25th	GS; 21st	•	•	GS; 25th	R16; 15th	•	TBD	TBD	9	20
Portugal		•	•	•	•	•	•	3rd	•	•	•	•	GS; 17th	•	•	•	GS; 21st	4th	R16; 11th	GS; 18th	R16; 13th	QF; 8th	R16; 13th	Q	TBD	9	22
Republic of Ireland (Note: Republic of Ireland competed as the Irish Free State in 1934 and then as Ireland in 1938 and 1950.)		•	•	•	•	•	•	•	•	•	•	•	•	QF; 8th	R16; 16th	•	R16; 12th	•	•	•	•	•	•	TBD	TBD	3	22
Romania	GS; 8th	R16; 12th	R16; 9th		•	•	•	•	GS; T-10th	•	•	•	•	R16; 12th	QF; 6th	R16; 11th	•	•	•	•	•	•	•	TBD	TBD	7	22
Russia						QF; 7th	QF; 6th	4th	QF; 5th	•×	•	GS2; 7th	R16; 10th	GS; 17th	GS; 18th	•	GS; 22nd	•	•	GS; 24th	QF; 8th	•×	×	TBD	TBD	11	17
Scotland	—N/a			••	GS; 15th	GS; 14th	•	•	•	GS1; 9th	GS1; 11th	GS1; 15th	GS; 19th	GS; T-18th	•	GS; 27th	•	•	•	•	•	•	GS; 36th	TBD	TBD	9	20
Serbia	4th (Note: There was no official World Cup match for third place in 1930; The United States and Yugoslavia lost in the semi-finals. Currently, FIFA recognizes the United States as the third-placed team and Yugoslavia as the fourth-placed team, using the overall records of the teams in the 1930 FIFA World Cup.)	•	•	GS; 5th	QF; 7th	QF; 5th	4th	•	•	GS2; 7th	•	GS1; 16th	•	QF; 5th	×	R16; 10th	•	GS; 32nd	GS; 23rd	•	GS; 23rd	GS; 29th	•	TBD	TBD	13	22
Slovakia		2nd	QF; 5th		GS; 14th	GS; 9th	2nd	•	GS; 15th	•	•	GS1; 19th	•	QF; 6th	•	•	•	•	R16; 16th	•	•	•	•	TBD	TBD	9	21
Slovenia	Part of Yugoslavia														—N/a	•	GS; 30th	•	GS; 18th	•	•	•	•	TBD	TBD	2	8
Spain		QF; 5th	×	4th	•	•	GS; 12th	GS; 10th	•	•	GS1; 10th	GS2; 12th	QF; 7th	R16; 10th	QF; 8th	GS; 17th	QF; 5th	R16; 9th	1st	GS; 23rd	R16; 10th	R16; 13th	1st	Q	TBD	17	21
Sweden		QF; 8th	4th	3rd	•	2nd	•	•	GS; 9th	GS2; 5th	GS1; 13th	•	•	GS; 21st	3rd	•	R16; 13th	R16; 14th	•	•	QF; 7th	•	R32; 27th	TBD	TBD	13	22
Switzerland		QF; 7th	QF; 7th	GS; 6th	QF; 8th	•	GS; 16th	GS; 16th	•	•	•	•	•	•	R16; 15th	•	•	R16; 10th	GS; 19th	R16; 11th	R16; 14th	R16; 12th	QF; T-7th	TBD	TBD	13	22
Turkey		×		••	GS; 9th	×	•	•	•	•	•	•	•	•	•	•	3rd	•	•	•	•	•	GS; 35th	TBD	TBD	3	19
Ukraine	Part of Soviet Union														—N/a	•	•	QF; 8th	•	•	•	•	•	TBD	TBD	1	8
Wales	—N/a			•	•	QF; 6th	•	•	•	•	•	•	•	•	•	•	•	•	•	•	•	GS; 30th	•	TBD	TBD	2	20

Legend

1st	Champions
2nd	Runners-up
3rd	Third place
4th	Fourth place
QF	Quarter-finals (1934–1938, 1954–1970, 1986–present)
R16	Knockout round of 16 (1934–1938, 1986–present)
R32	Knockout round of 32 (2026–present)
GS	Group stage (1930, 1950–1970, 1986–present)
GS1	First group stage (1974–1982)
GS2	Second group stage (1974–1982)

Q	Qualified for upcoming tournament
TBD	To be determined (may still qualify for upcoming tournament)
••	Qualified but withdrew
•	Did not qualify
•×	Withdrew or disqualified during qualification (after playing matches)
×	Withdrew before qualification / Banned / Entry not accepted by FIFA
	Hosts
	Did not enter
—N/a	Not a FIFA member

=== Overall team records ===
As per statistical convention in football, matches decided in extra time are counted as wins and losses, while matches decided by penalty shoot-outs are counted as draws. 3 points per win, 1 point per draw and 0 points per loss.

As of 2026 FIFA World Cup

Team	Part	Pld	W	D	L	GF	GA	GD	Pts
Germany	21	116	70	22	24	243	135	+108	232
Italy	18	83	45	21	17	128	77	+51	156
France	17	81	45	14	22	156	95	+61	149
England	17	82	38	23	21	124	80	+44	137
Spain	17	75	38	18	19	122	76	+46	132
Netherlands	12	59	32	16	11	107	57	+50	112
Belgium	15	57	24	12	21	83	81	+2	84
Sweden	13	55	20	14	21	87	83	+4	74
Russia	11	45	19	10	16	77	54	+23	67
Portugal	9	40	19	8	13	69	44	+25	65
Serbia	13	49	18	9	22	71	71	0	63
Switzerland	13	47	17	10	20	65	79	−14	61
Poland	9	38	17	6	15	49	50	−1	57
Croatia	7	34	15	8	11	49	40	+9	53
Hungary	9	32	15	3	14	87	57	+30	48
Austria	8	33	13	5	15	49	56	−7	44
Slovakia	9	34	12	6	16	49	52	−3	42
Czech Republic	10	36	12	6	18	49	55	−6	42
Denmark	6	23	9	6	8	31	29	+2	33
Romania	7	21	8	5	8	30	32	−2	29
Scotland	9	26	5	7	14	26	45	−19	22
Norway	4	14	6	3	5	20	19	+1	21
Turkey	3	13	6	1	6	23	22	+1	19
Bulgaria	7	26	3	8	15	22	53	−31	17
Republic of Ireland	3	13	2	8	3	10	10	0	14
Northern Ireland	3	13	3	5	5	13	23	−10	14
East Germany	1	6	2	2	2	5	5	0	8
Greece	3	10	2	2	6	5	20	−15	8
Ukraine	1	5	2	1	2	5	7	−2	7
Bosnia and Herzegovina	2	7	2	1	4	9	12	−3	7
Wales	2	8	1	4	3	5	10	−5	7
Slovenia	2	6	1	1	4	5	10	−5	4
Israel	1	3	0	2	1	1	3	−2	2
Iceland	1	3	0	1	2	2	5	−3	1

Breakdown of successor team records

Czech Republic/Slovakia breakdown
Team	Part	Pld	W	D	L	GF	GA	GD	Pts
Czechoslovakia (1934–1990)	8	30	11	5	14	44	45	−1	38
Czech Republic (2006–present)	2	6	1	1	4	5	10	−5	4
Slovakia (2010–present)	1	4	1	1	2	5	7	−2	4

Germany breakdown
Team	Part	Pld	W	D	L	GF	GA	GD	Pts
Germany (1934–1938)	2	6	3	1	2	14	13	+1	10
West Germany (1950–1990)	10	62	36	14	12	131	77	+54	122
Germany (1994–present)	9	48	31	7	10	98	45	+53	100

Russia breakdown
Team	Part	Pld	W	D	L	GF	GA	GD	Pts
Soviet Union (1958–1990)	7	31	15	6	10	53	34	+19	51
Russia (1994–present)	4	14	4	4	6	24	20	+4	16

Serbia breakdown
Team	Part	Pld	W	D	L	GF	GA	GD	Pts
(Kingdom of Yugoslavia) Yugoslavia (1930–1990)	8	33	14	7	12	55	42	+13	49
FR Yugoslavia (1998)	1	4	2	1	1	5	4	+1	7
Serbia and Montenegro (2006)	1	3	0	0	3	2	10	−8	0
Serbia (2010–present)	3	9	2	1	6	9	15	−6	7

== Appearances ==
=== Ranking of teams by number of appearances ===
Team	Appearances	Record streak	Active streak	Debut	Most recent	Best result (* = hosts)
Germany	21	19	19	1934	2026	Champions (1954, 1974*, 1990, 2014)
Italy	18	14	0	1934	2014	Champions (1934*, 1938, 1982, 2006)
England	17	8	8	1950	2026	Champions (1966*)
France	17	8	8	1930	2026	Champions (1998*, 2018)
Spain	17	13	13	1934	2026	Champions (2010, 2026)
Belgium	15	6	4	1930	2026	Third place (2018)
Switzerland	13	6	6	1934	2026	Quarter-finals (1934, 1938, 1954*, 2026)
Serbia	13	4	0	1930	2022	Fourth place (1930, 1962)
Sweden	13	3	1	1934	2026	Runners-up (1958*)
Netherlands	12	3	2	1934	2026	Runners-up (1974, 1978, 2010)
Russia	11	4	0	1958	2018	Fourth place (1966)
Czech Republic	10	3	1	1934	2026	Runners-up (1934, 1962)
Portugal	9	7	7	1966	2026	Third place (1966)
Scotland	9	5	1	1954	2026	First round / Group stage
Poland	9	4	0	1938	2022	Third place (1974, 1982)
Hungary	9	4	0	1934	1986	Runners-up (1938, 1954)
Slovakia	9	3	0	1934	2010	Runners-up (1934, 1962)
Austria	8	2	1	1934	2026	Third place (1954)
Croatia	7	4	4	1998	2026	Runners-up (2018)
Bulgaria	7	4	0	1962	1998	Fourth place (1994)
Romania	7	3	0	1930	1998	Quarter-finals (1994)
Denmark	6	2	0	1986	2022	Quarter-finals (1998)
Norway	4	2	1	1938	2026	Quarter-finals (2026)
Northern Ireland	3	2	0	1958	1986	Quarter-finals (1958)
Republic of Ireland	3	2	0	1990	2002	Quarter-finals (1990)
Greece	3	2	0	1994	2014	Round of 16 (2014)
Turkey	3	1	1	1954	2026	Third place (2002)
Bosnia and Herzegovina	2	1	1	2014	2026	Round of 32 (2026)
Wales	2	1	0	1958	2022	Quarter-finals (1958)
Slovenia	2	1	0	2002	2010	Group stage
Israel	1	1	0	1970	1970	Group stage
East Germany	1	1	—N/a	1974	1974	Second round (1974)
Ukraine	1	1	0	2006	2006	Quarter-finals (2006)
Iceland	1	1	0	2018	2018	Group stage

Czech Republic/Slovakia breakdown
Team	Appearances	Record streak	Active streak	Debut	Most recent	Best result
Czechoslovakia (1934–1990)	8	3	—	1934	1990	Runners-up (1934, 1962)
Czech Republic (2006–present)	2	1	1	2006	2026	Group stage
Slovakia (2010–present)	1	1	0	2010	2010	Round of 16

Russia breakdown
Team	Appearances	Record streak	Active streak	Debut	Most recent	Best result (* = hosts)
Soviet Union (1958–1990)	7	4	—	1958	1990	Fourth place (1966)
Russia (1994–present)	4	2	0	1994	2018	Quarter-finals (2018*)

Germany breakdown
Team	Appearances	Record streak	Active streak	Debut	Most recent	Best result (* = hosts)
Germany (1934–1938)	2	2	—	1934	1938	Third place (1934)
West Germany (1950–1990)	10	10	10	1954	1990	Champions (1954, 1974*, 1990)
Germany (1994–present)	9	9	9	1994	2026	Champions (2014)

Serbia breakdown
Team	Appearances	Record streak	Active streak	Debut	Most recent	Best result
(Kingdom of Yugoslavia) Yugoslavia (1930–1990)	8	4	—	1930	1990	Fourth place (1930, 1962)
FR Yugoslavia (1998)	1	1	—	1998	1998	Round of 16
Serbia and Montenegro (2006)	1	1	—	2006	2006	Group stage
Serbia (2010–present)	3	2	0	2010	2022	Group stage

=== Team debuts ===
Year	Debutants	Total
1930	Belgium, France, Romania, Yugoslavia	4
1934	Austria, Czechoslovakia, Germany, Hungary, Italy, Netherlands, Spain, Sweden, Switzerland	9
1938	Norway, Poland	2
1950	England	1
1954	Scotland, Turkey	2
1958	Northern Ireland, Soviet Union, Wales	3
1962	Bulgaria	1
1966	Portugal	1
1974	East Germany	1
1986	Denmark	1
1990	Republic of Ireland	1
1994	Greece	1
1998	Croatia	1
2002	Slovenia	1
2006	Ukraine	1
2010	Slovakia	1
2014	Bosnia and Herzegovina	1
2018	Iceland	1
Total		33

*This total number of UEFA teams which have participated in the World Cups through 2018 is 34, using FIFA's view on successor teams (e.g., Russia is a successor of USSR and not a separate team, whereas Ukraine is a newer separate entity).

=== Not qualified ===
22 of the 55 active FIFA and UEFA members have never qualified for the final tournament.

European teams who have yet to qualify
Team	Number of qualifying attempts	1930 (Uruguay)	1934 (Italy)	1938 (France)	1950 (Brazil)	1954 (Switzerland)	1958 (Sweden)	1962 (Chile)	1966 (England)	1970 (Mexico)	1974 (West Germany)	1978 (Argentina)	1982 (Spain)	1986 (Mexico)	1990 (Italy)	1994 (United States)	1998 (France)	2002 (South Korea) (Japan)	2006 (Germany)	2010 (South Africa)	2014 (Brazil)	2018 (Russia)	2022 (Qatar)	2026 (Canada) (Mexico) (United States)	2030 (Morocco) (Portugal) (Spain)	2034 (Saudi Arabia)
Luxembourg	22		•	•	•	•	•	•	•	•	•	•	•	•	•	•	•	•	•	•	•	•	•	•	TBD	TBD
Finland	21			•	•	•	•	•	•	•	•	•	•	•	•	•	•	•	•	•	•	•	•	•	TBD	TBD
Cyprus	17	—N/a					×	•	•	•	•	•	•	•	•	•	•	•	•	•	•	•	•	•	TBD	TBD
Albania	14	—N/a							•	×	•		•	•	•	•	•	•	•	•	•	•	•	•	TBD	TBD
Malta	14	—N/a									•	•	•	•	•	•	•	•	•	•	•	•	•	•	TBD	TBD
Estonia	11		•	•	Part of Soviet Union											•	•	•	•	•	•	•	•	•	TBD	TBD
Lithuania	11		•	•	Part of Soviet Union											•	•	•	•	•	•	•	•	•	TBD	TBD
Latvia	10			•	Part of Soviet Union											•	•	•	•	•	•	•	•	•	TBD	TBD
Faroe Islands	9	—N/a														•	•	•	•	•	•	•	•	•	TBD	TBD
San Marino	9	—N/a														•	•	•	•	•	•	•	•	•	TBD	TBD
Armenia	8	Part of Soviet Union														—N/a	•	•	•	•	•	•	•	•	TBD	TBD
Azerbaijan	8	Part of Soviet Union														—N/a	•	•	•	•	•	•	•	•	TBD	TBD
Belarus	8	Part of Soviet Union														—N/a	•	•	•	•	•	•	•	•	TBD	TBD
Georgia	8	Part of Soviet Union														—N/a	•	•	•	•	•	•	•	•	TBD	TBD
Kazakhstan	8	Part of Soviet Union														—N/a	•	•	•	•	•	•	•	•	TBD	TBD
Kazakhstan	8	Part of Soviet Union														—N/a	Member of AFC		•	•	•	•	•	•	TBD	TBD
Liechtenstein	8	—N/a														×	•	•	•	•	•	•	•	•	TBD	TBD
Moldova	8	Part of Romania			Part of Soviet Union											—N/a	•	•	•	•	•	•	•	•	TBD	TBD
North Macedonia (Note: Entered World Cup qualifying as FYR Macedonia from 1998–2018)	8	Part of Yugoslavia														—N/a	•	•	•	•	•	•	•	•	TBD	TBD
Andorra	7	—N/a																•	•	•	•	•	•	•	TBD	TBD
Montenegro	5	Part of Yugoslavia														Serbia and Montenegro				•	•	•	•	•	TBD	TBD
Gibraltar	3	Part of England (Note: The Gibraltar Football Association was affiliated to the Football Association (of England) from 1909 until 2013, when the GFA became full members of UEFA. The GFA became full members of FIFA in 2016.)																				•	•	•	TBD	TBD
Kosovo	3	Part of Yugoslavia														Serbia and Montenegro				Serbia (Note: The Republic of Kosovo declared independence from Serbia in 2008. It has since gained diplomatic recognition as a sovereign state by 98 UN member states. Prior to the admission of Kosovo into UEFA and FIFA, Kosovo was recognised as part of Serbia by these organisations.)		•	•	•	TBD	TBD
Saar	1	Part of Germany				•	Part of West Germany												Part of Germany							

Legend

TBD	To be determined (may still qualify for upcoming tournament)
•	Did not qualify
×	Withdrew before qualification / Banned / Entry not accepted by FIFA
	Did not enter
—N/a	Not a FIFA member

== See also ==
- World Football Elo Ratings
- FIFA World Cup records and statistics
