= Jorge Larrionda =

Uruguayan football referee (born 1968)

- Full name: Jorge Luis Larrionda Pietrafesa
- Born: 9 March 1968 (age 58); Montevideo, Uruguay
Years		Role
1995–2010		Referee

International
Years	League	Role
1998–2010	FIFA listed	Referee

Jorge Luis Larrionda Pietrafesa (born 9 March 1968) is a retired FIFA football referee from Uruguay who officiated at international matches from 1998 to 2010. He officiated at the 2006 FIFA World Cup, where he took charge of four matches, including a semifinal between Portugal and France. He then officiated at the 2009 FIFA Confederations Cup and the 2010 FIFA World Cup, where he officiated two matches, including a round of 16 tie between England and Germany. During this game he failed to award a goal to England and was not selected for any further matches.

Larrionda is also well known in South America, having participated in countless matches of continental competitions such as the Copa Libertadores and the Campeonato Uruguayo.

He retired from refereeing in 2011. He was known as a strict referee who showed a high number of cards.

== Career ==
Prior to the 2006 FIFA World Cup, Larrionda officiated 34 games internationally in matches in the 2001 Copa America, 2002 World Cup qualifying matches for CONMEBOL and CONCACAF, the 2003 Confederations Cup, the 2004 Olympics, the 2004 Libertadores Cup, the 2005 FIFA World Youth Championship and Under-17 World Championship, and 2006 World Cup CONMEBOL qualifying matches.

Larrionda was selected as a referee for the 2002 FIFA World Cup, but was suspended for six months by the Uruguayan Football Association two days after his selection, and was dropped from the list of referees. The organization cited "irregularities" which were not specified. Larrionda was one of five referees suspended for what the president of the Uruguayan board described as "irregularities that were denounced by other referees." The suspensions reportedly arose from accusations of corruption between members of rival Uruguayan soccer officials unions.

Larrionda officiated over a 2006 FIFA World Cup qualifier held 13 October 2004 between Brazil and Colombia at Maceio, Brazil. The match ended in a draw.

Larrionda was selected as a referee for the 2009 FIFA Confederations Cup. He took charge of the 2009 Confederations Cup semifinal, in which the United States upset Spain 2-0. He issued four yellow cards in the match, two to each side, as well as a straight red to the USA's Michael Bradley late in the game.

Larrionda refereed the second leg of the two legged playoff between Bahrain and New Zealand, in Wellington. The first leg was refereed by Hungarian Viktor Kassai.

=== 2006 FIFA World Cup ===
Larrionda was selected again to officiate for the 2006 World Cup. He refereed the Angola - Portugal match on 11 June. Larrionda's second assignment in the 2006 World Cup was the 17 June match Italy - United States. He became the fourth referee to send off three players in a single World Cup finals match, after sending off Italy's Daniele De Rossi for an elbow to the cheek of Brian McBride, United States' Pablo Mastroeni for a two-footed tackle, and Eddie Pope for a late tackle which saw Pope receive his second yellow card. In total for the match, Larrionda issued four yellow and three red cards; all but one of the cards were issued during the first 47 minutes of the match. Larrionda was chosen to officiate another group-stage match, between France and Togo.

On 28 June FIFA announced that Larrionda would be one of the final group of 12 referees retained for the remainder of the tournament, and on 2 July he was appointed to officiate the second semi final between Portugal and France (5 July). Larrionda officiated the France-Portugal semi-final match on 5 July 2006. In the 32nd minute, he awarded a penalty kick to France for a foul by Ricardo Carvalho on Thierry Henry. The shot was taken successfully by Zinedine Zidane, which became the only goal of the game as France won 1-0. Larrionda gave out only two yellow cards in the match. Larrionda booked Carvalho in the 83rd minute and Louis Saha of France in the 87th. Both players were already carrying yellows, and thus missed the match for third place and final, respectively, due to card accumulation.

=== 2010 FIFA World Cup ===
Larrionda was selected as a referee for the 2010 FIFA World Cup. He was the referee at the Australia-Serbia group stage match, which Australia won 2-1. He refereed the match between England and Germany that Germany went on to win 4-1. Larrionda failed to award a goal when a shot from Frank Lampard came off of the crossbar and crossed the goal line. It would have made the score 2–2 at the time. This incident renewed calls for the introduction of goal-line technology. Due to his failure to award a goal when the ball clearly crossed the line, Larrionda along with his two assistants were not chosen by FIFA for the final stages.
