= Héctor Vergara =

Canadian soccer referee (born 1966)

- Full name: Héctor O. Vergara
- Born: December 15, 1966 (age 59); San Javier, Chile

Domestic
Years	League	Role
1993	Canadian National Soccer League	Referee

International
Years	League	Role
1993–2011	FIFA	Assistant referee

Héctor O. Vergara (born December 15, 1966) is a Canadian soccer referee. Born in San Javier, Chile, Vergara grew up in Winnipeg, Manitoba. He attended John Taylor Collegiate, and earned a Bachelor of Recreation Studies (Sports Administration) and a Bachelor of Arts in Advanced Psychology from the University of Manitoba.

Vergara played soccer competitively for 10 years and recreationally for 30 years. He began working as a referee in 1983 and now has 28 years of experience as a referee. In 1993, he officiated matches in the Canadian National Soccer League. As executive director of the Manitoba Soccer Association, Vergara oversees the MSA's many member leagues, clubs and associations, not to mention the countless players, coaches, volunteers, and referees throughout Manitoba. Since he was hired, the MSA's core staff has grown from two or three employees to seven, mirroring soccer's rise in popularity in the province and the world. Vergara has become one of the most prolific – and well-respected – referees in Canada.

Vergara retired as a FIFA Assistant Referee effective November 12, 2011, the day after his last FIFA international appointment. He was part of the full Canadian crew alongside Mauricio Navarro (Referee), Daniel Belleau (AR2) and David Gantar (4th) that took take charge of the FIFA World Cup Qualifying match between the US Virgin Islands and Curaçao on November 11, 2011 in Frederiksted, US Virgin Islands.

Vergara spent 19 years on the FIFA list and was involved in 11 FIFA competitions. Three of those competitions were FIFA World Cups (2002, 2006 and 2010). Vergara claimed the record for most World Cup games as a referee/assistant referee at 14 when he took the field July 10, 2010 in the match for third place between Uruguay and Germany at Port Elizabeth Stadium. His World Cup appointments included the match for third place in 2002 and 2010, as well as the Germany - Italy Semi-Final in 2006.

In total, Vergara officiated nearly 150 international matches involving Clubs and Nationals Teams playing at the highest competitions in the world. His list of accomplishments include Six CONCACAF Gold Cups (three Finals), the 2004 Olympic Games (Semi-Final), the 2009 FIFA Confederations Cup (Fifth official on final), two FIFA Club World Cups (finals in 2005 & 2009) as well as two FIFA U-20 World Youth Championship (ARG-FRA QF) and two FIFA U17 World Championships (BRA-ARG semi in 1995, match for third place in 1993).

In 2012, Vergara was appointed by FIFA to its Referees' Committee as a Development Member. He was selected as a member of the Canadian Soccer Hall of Fame in 2014.

== Career statistics ==
=== International tournaments and competitions refereed ===
- 2011 CONCACAF Gold Cup
- 2010 FIFA World Cup South Africa
- 2010 FIFA World Cup Qualification Matches
- 2010 CONCACAF Champions League
- 2010 Interliga
- 2010 UAE Games
- 2009 FIFA Club World Cup
- 2009 FIFA Confederations Cup
- 2009 CONCACAF Gold Cup
- 2007 U20 FIFA World Youth Championship
- 2007 CONCACAF Gold Cup
- 2006 FIFA World Cup Germany
- 2006 FIFA World Cup Qualification Matches
- 2005 FIFA Club World Cup Japan 2005
- 2005 CONCACAF Gold Cup
- 2004 FIFA Athens Olympic Games
- 2004 FIFA Athens Olympic Qualifying Tournament - Mexico
- 2004 FIFA Toyota U-23 International Tournament - Qatar
- 2003 CONCACAF Gold Cup - Mexico
- 2002 FIFA World Cup Korea/Japan
- 2002 FIFA World Cup Korea/Japan Qualification Matches
- 2002 CONCACAF Gold Cup
- 2001 FIFA U-20 World Youth Championship
- 2000 Olympic CONCACAF Qualifying Tournament
- 1999 CONCACAF Club Championship
- 1999 US Cup
- 1999 Canada Cup
- 1998 FIFA World Cup France Qualification Matches
- 1998 CONCACAF U-20 World Championship Qualification Tournament
- 1998 CONCACAF Caribbean Shell Cup
- 1997 US Cup
- 1995 FIFA U-17 World Championship
- 1995 Canada Cup
- 1993 FIFA U-17 World Championship

=== Other information ===
- 2010 Sport Manitoba Official of the Year
- 2006 Sport Manitoba Official of the Year
- 2005 Sport Manitoba Official of the Year
- 2004 Sport Manitoba Official of the Year
- 2004 Included in the book of "Who is Who in Canadian Sport"
- 2003 John Meachin Memorial Soccer Award
- 2002 Sport Manitoba Official of the Year
- 2002 CSA International Achievement Award
- 2002 MSA Frank Major Award of Merit
- 1997 MSRA Outstanding Contribution Award
- 1996 Ray Morgan Memorial Award
- 1995 WYSA Recognition Award
