= Swimbappé =

Goldfish that predicted FIFA match winners

Swimbappé (debuted June 11, 2026) is an oranda goldfish residing in downtown Toronto, Canada. He gained international attention during the 2026 FIFA World Cup after videos of him predicting match winners in a storefront window tank went viral on social media in June 2026. He selects winners by swimming towards flags on either side of his tank before the matches are scheduled. The videos are then uploaded to social media accounts in his name.

== Background ==
Swimbappé's tank sits in the window of The Combine, a social hub at 225 Wellington Street W in Toronto, Ontario. His tank resembles an underwater soccer field, and has a sign beside it calling him "the oracle goldfish predicting the winners of every [FIFA 2026] match". His tank weighs approximately 650 lbs when filled and a structure was built to support it against the storefront window.

Swimbappé is facilitated by TADIEM (Bensimon Byrne, Narrative XPR, OneMethod, HiFi, Superproper), a collection of Toronto-based creative studios, in hopes of engaging both Torontonians and World Cup fans within the city. His owner is OneMethod creative director Tim Glenn. Potential naming suggestions for the fish included "Gary" and "Finaldo," prior to settling on Swimbappé. The name is a reference to French soccer player Kylian Mbappé.

== Reception ==
The self-titled "Oracle Goldfish" gained traction for seemingly arbitrarily predicting winners to FIFA matches. After debuting on social media with his own account on June 11, 2026, Swimbappé was featured in national and international news outlets and blogs.

On social media, Swimbappé has attracted soccer fans and local Toronto residents, appearing on numerous accounts and platforms as a destination for FIFA fans. Crowds have been photographed around the tank, with warnings to fans that a line may form to take pictures with the fish.

Swimbappé gained further national notoriety after correctly predicting Canada's first men's FIFA World Cup victory on June 18, 2026. Creative director Tim Glenn described the prediction as "nerve-wracking".

Swimbappé has been compared to Paul the Octopus, an animal that correctly predicted the result of the 2010 World Cup in Oberhausen, Germany.

== Predictions ==
=== Methodology ===
Swimbappé is dropped into his tank. After a minute of swimming freely, a countdown from ten is initiated. By zero, the side he is swimming in is filmed as his official prediction. This prediction is posted to social media ahead of the scheduled match.

Swimbappé publicly predicted 102 of 104 FIFA 2026 games by swimming side to side in his tank. He predicted 56 of 102 games correctly, with a win rate of 66.7% if excluding draws. Swimbappé predicted the final match between Argentina and Spain correctly on the morning of Sunday, July 19, 2026.
