= Parrot astrology =

Divination by means of parrot picking cards

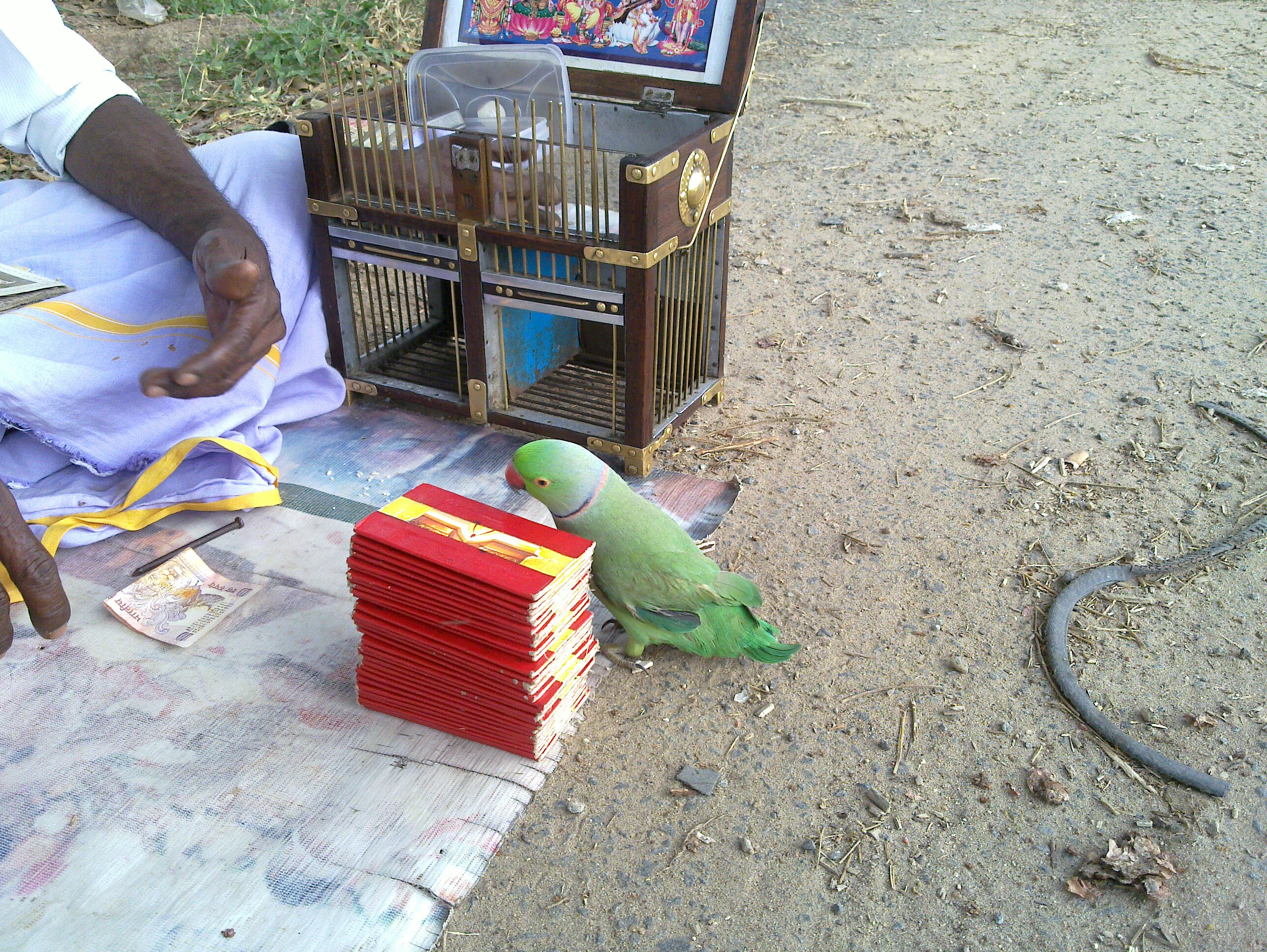
A parakeet in action

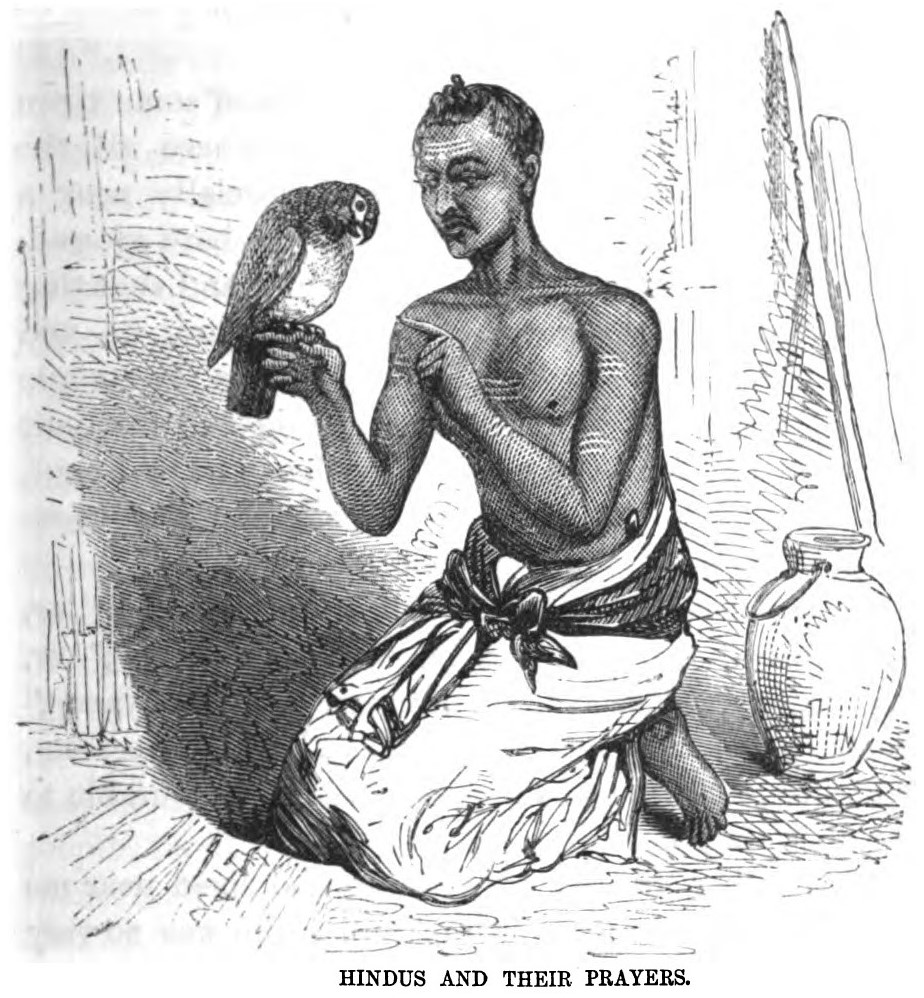
Hindus and their prayers (p.65, May 1865, XXII)

Parrot astrology or parakeet fortune-telling is a type of astrology traditionally practiced in the Indian states of Tamil Nadu and Andhra Pradesh and by Indian Singaporeans. It involves using mainly rose-ringed and Alexandrine parakeets which are trained to pick up Tarot-like fortune cards.

== Fortune telling process ==
A parrot astrologer/fortune teller typically sits beneath a tree to call or by the side of the road where people congregate, with the cage to the side and divination cards spread or stacked in front of them. The cards are similar to tarot cards, but are a deck of only 27 cards, representing the Indian cosmic system. Each card contains the image of religious figures, such as a Hindu deity, Buddha, or the Virgin Mary with infant Jesus.

When a patron sits before the fortune teller, the latter opens the cage and lets the parrot out. The parrot is trained to pick a card from the stack or the spread with its beak and give it to the astrologer. The astrologer then opens the card, and based on the image, tells the fortune of the patron.

== Popular culture ==
The practice of parrot astrology is diminishing in Tamil Nadu due to lack of patronage. In Singapore it is a tourist attraction at M. Muniyappan's fortune telling shop in Little India along the Serangoon Road. A variant is also practiced in Pakistan.

== Gallery ==
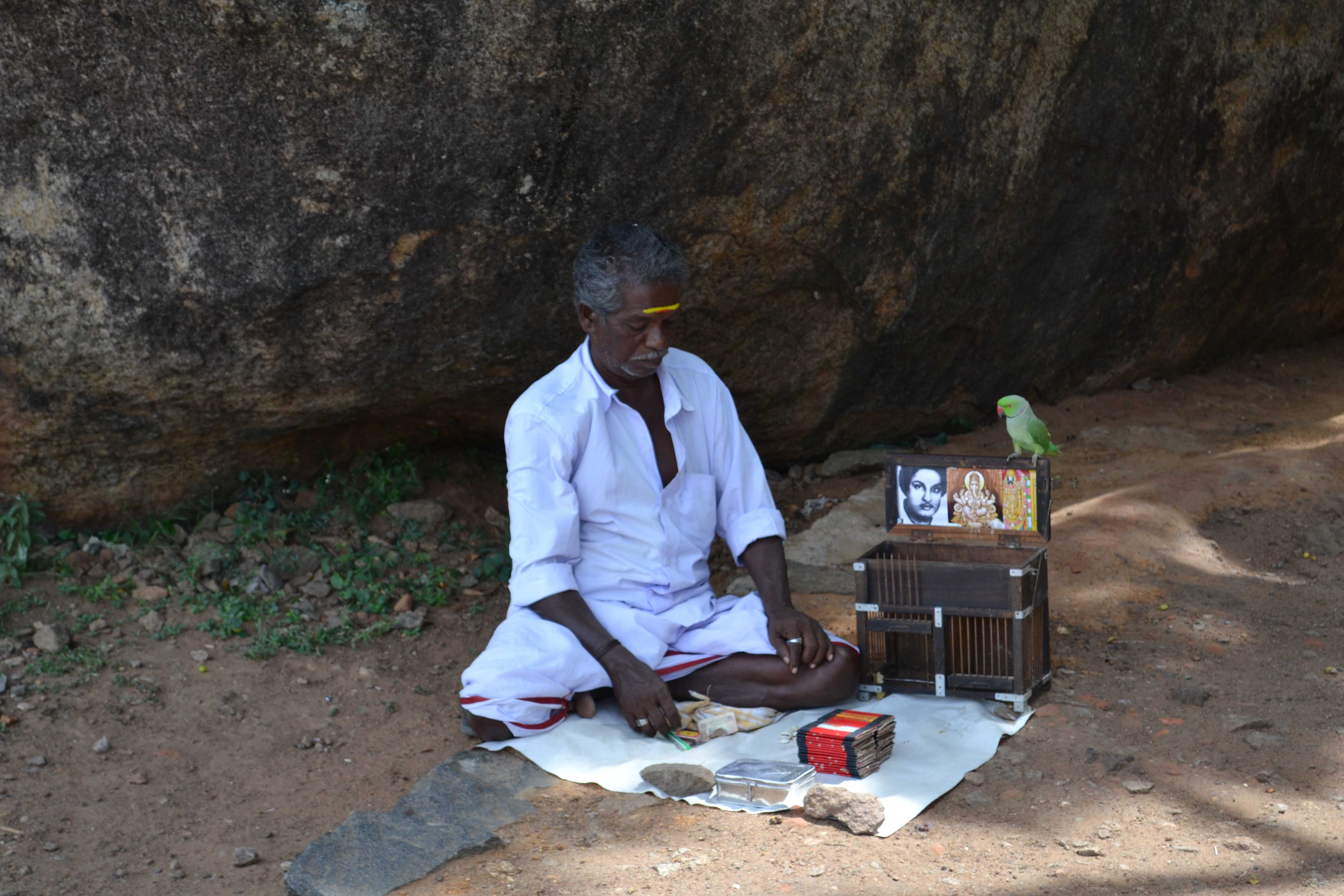
A parrot astrologer sitting beneath a tree

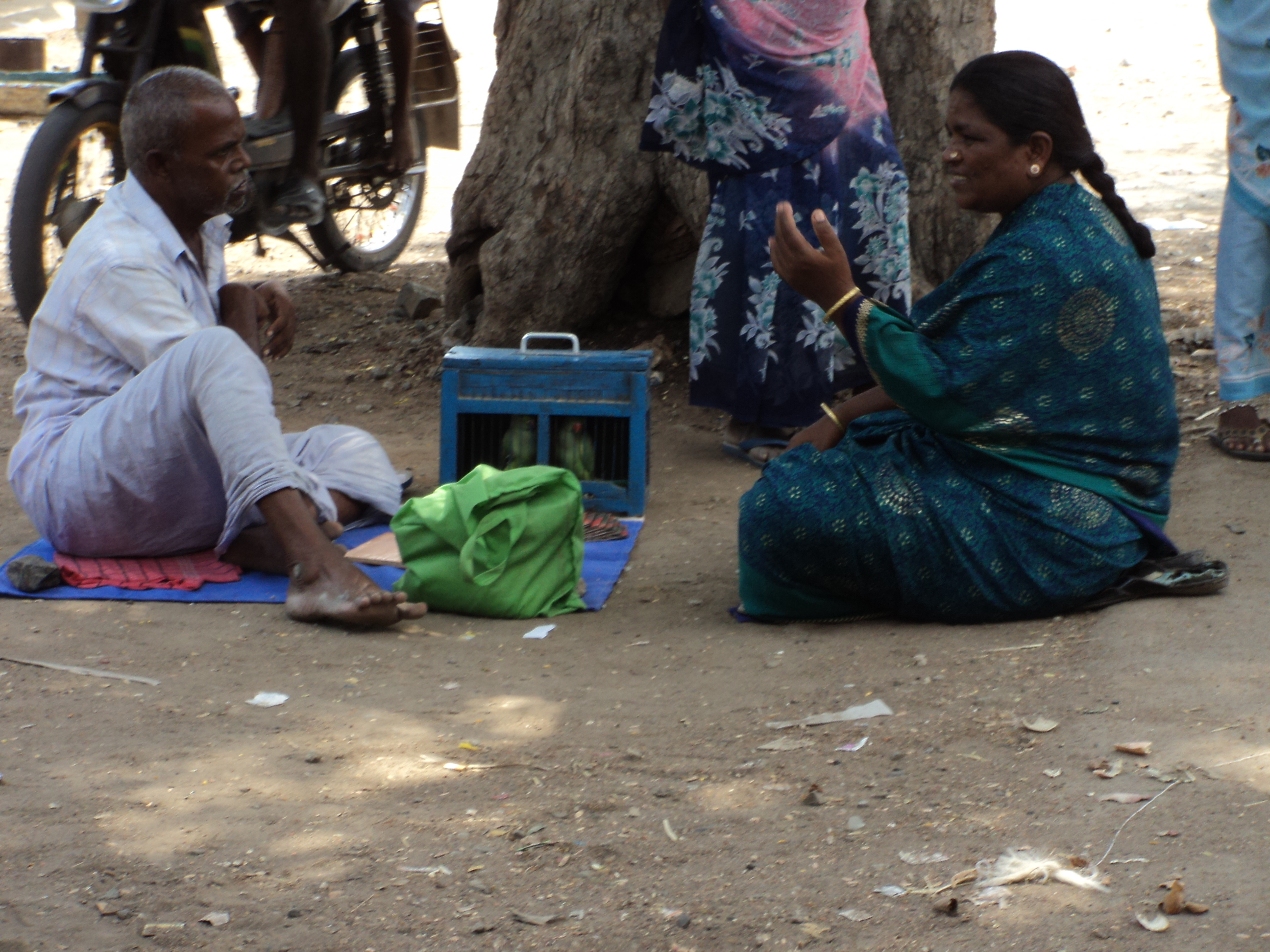
A patron seeks her fortune

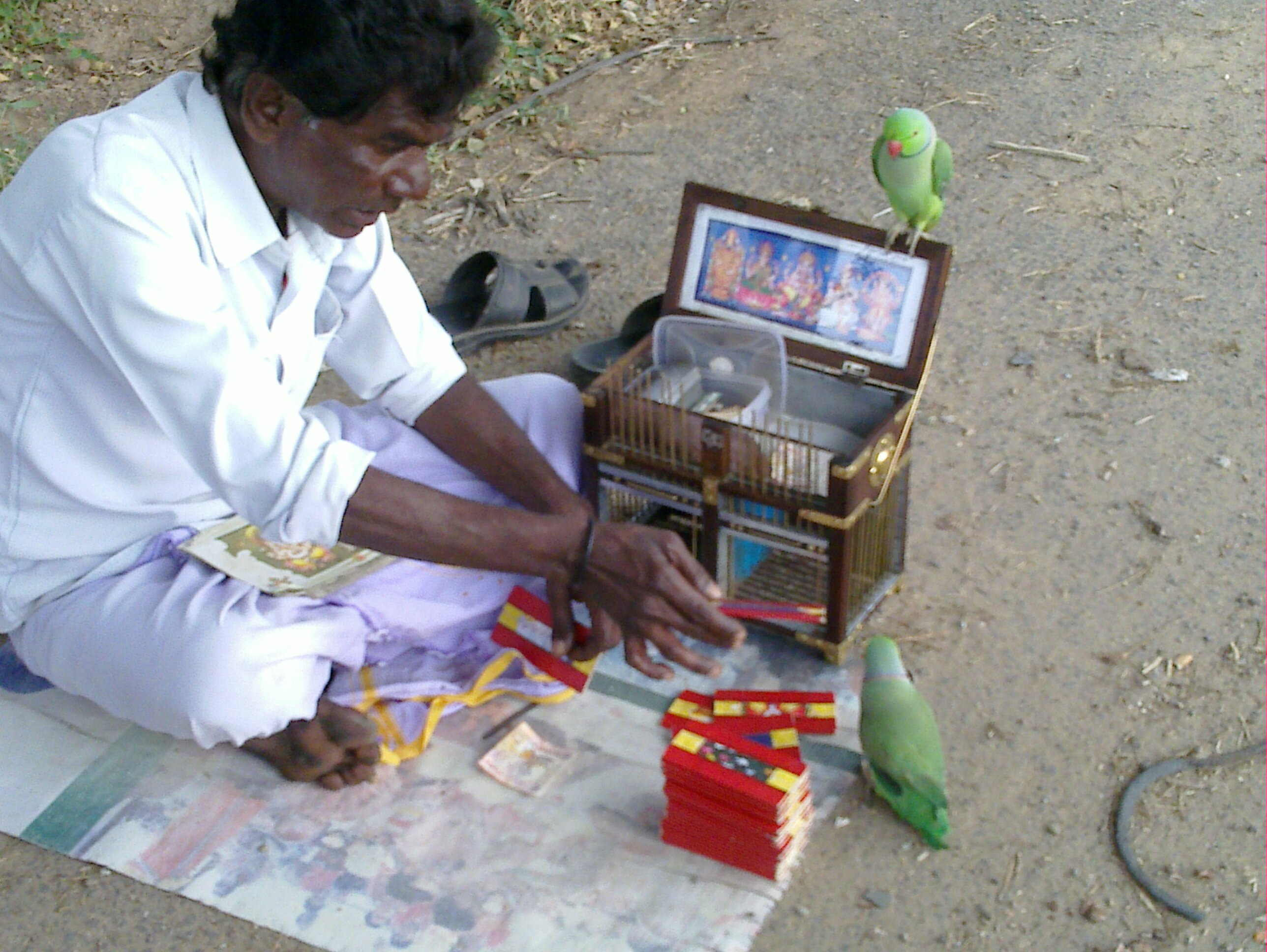
Parrot going through the cards

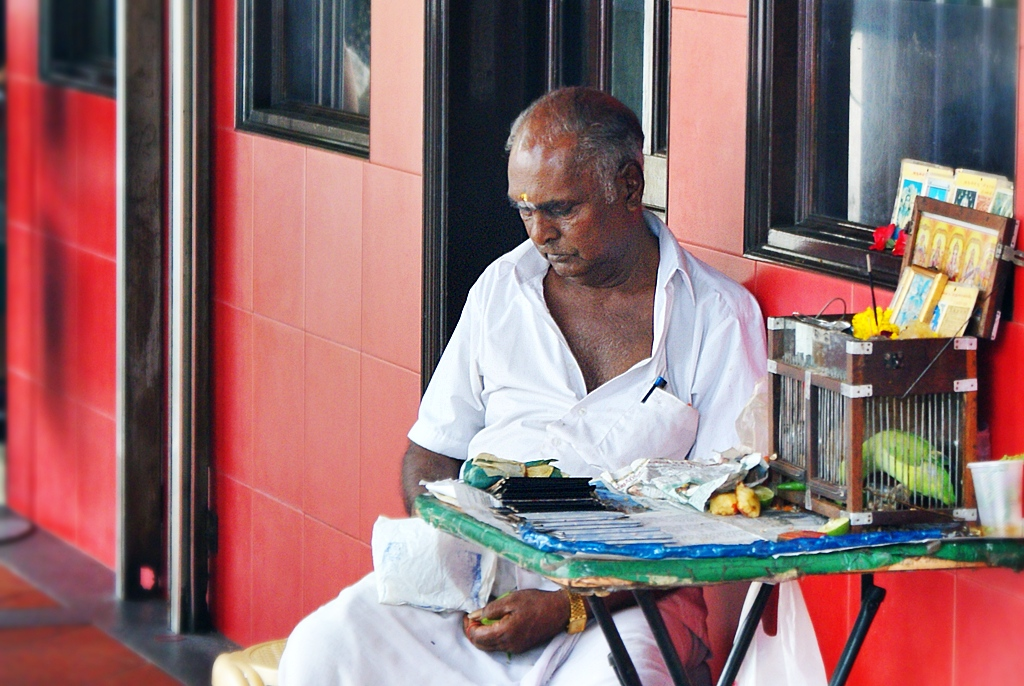
Mani the parakeet

== See also ==
- Fortune telling
- Mani the parakeet
