= Rabie Ridge Stadium =

Building in South Africa

- Interactive map of Rabie Ridge Stadium
- Location: Rabie Ridge, Johannesburg, South Africa
- Coordinates: 26.021276°S 28.169516°E
- Owner: City of Johannesburg

Construction
- Renovated: 2010

The Rabie Ridge Stadium is located in Rabie Ridge, a suburb of Johannesburg, South Africa. It is used mostly for football matches and was utilized as a training field for teams participating in the 2010 FIFA World Cup after seating, change rooms, and stadium management facilities were upgraded in 2010 and brought up to FIFA standards.
