= Paul the Octopus =

Octopus who predicted football match results

Paul
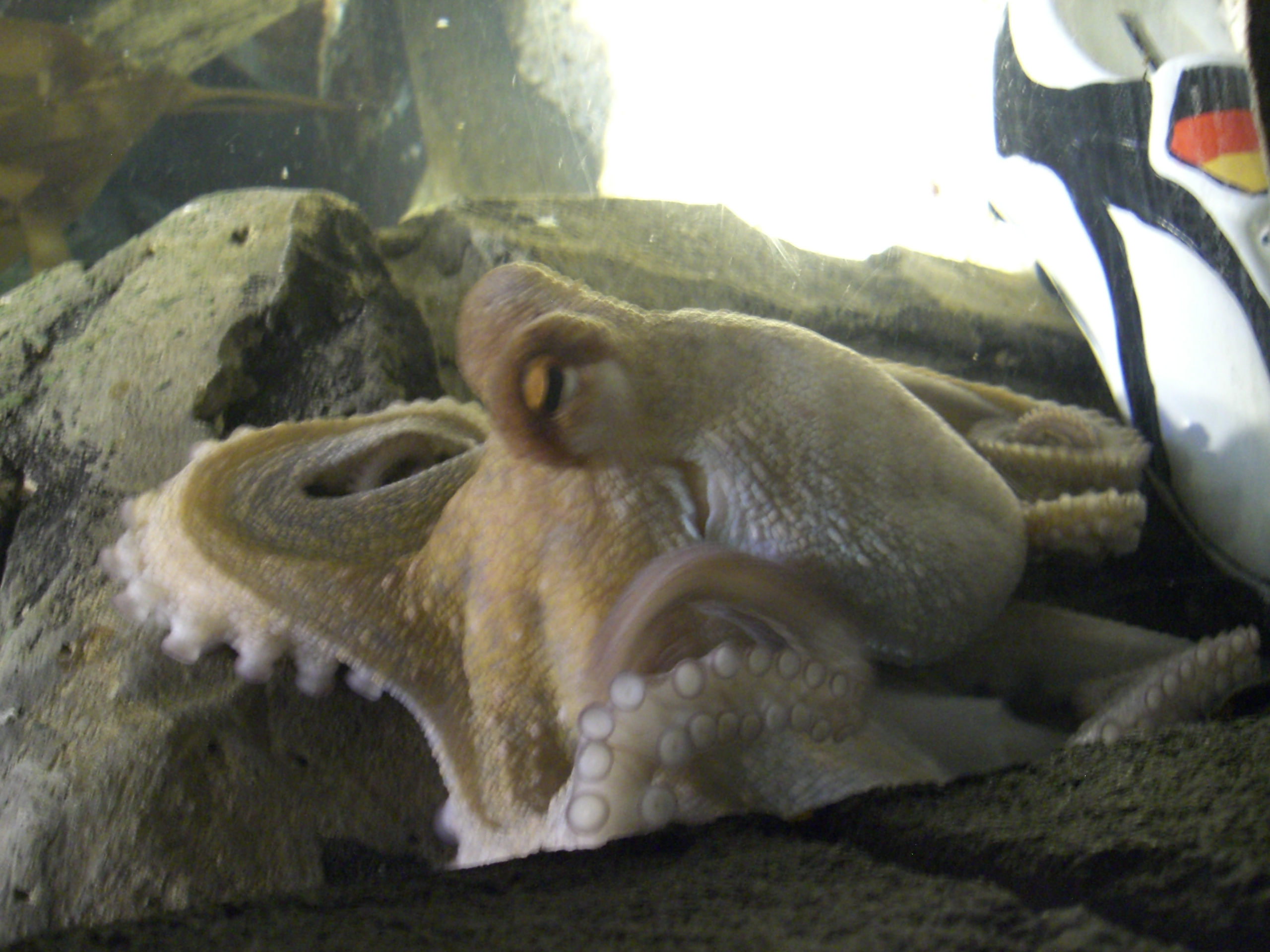
- Paul, next to a football boot with the German flag colours, in his tank
- Other names: Paul Oktopus, Die Krake Paul
- Species: Octopus vulgaris
- Sex: Male
- Hatched: 26 January 2008; Weymouth, England
- Died: 26 October 2010 (aged 2); Oberhausen, Germany
- Known for: Successfully predicting results of football matches
- Owner: Sea Life Centres
- Named after: Der Tintenfisch Paul Oktopus – poem by Boy Lornsen

Paul the Octopus (26 January 2008 – 26 October 2010) was a common octopus who predicted the results of international association football matches. Accurate predictions in the 2010 World Cup brought him worldwide attention as an animal oracle.

During divinations, Paul's keepers would present him with two food-containing boxes decorated with the flags of the teams in an upcoming match. Whichever box Paul ate from first was considered his prediction for which team would win the match.

His keepers at the Sea Life Centre in Oberhausen, Germany, mainly tasked him with predicting the outcomes of international matches in which the German team was playing. Paul correctly chose the winning team in four of Germany's six Euro 2008 matches, and all seven of their matches in the 2010 World Cup—including Germany's match for third place win over Uruguay on 10 July. He also correctly chose Spain as the winner of the 2010 FIFA World Cup final. In all, Paul amassed an overall record of 12 correct predictions out of 14: a success rate of approximately 85.7%.

== Life ==
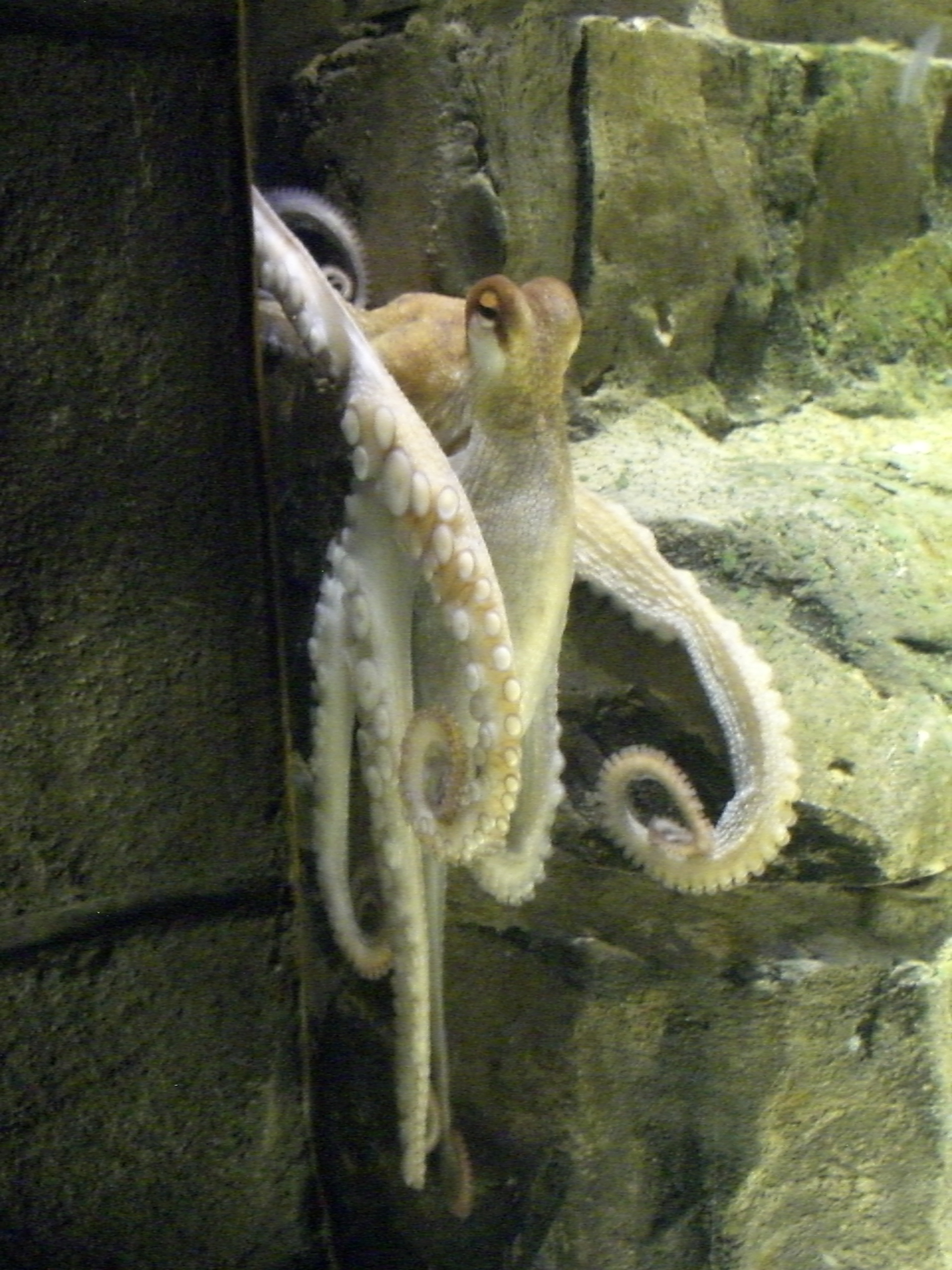
Paul in his tank, 2010

Paul was hatched from an egg at the Sea Life Centre in Weymouth, England, and was then moved to a tank at one of the chain's centres at Oberhausen in Germany. Paul's name derived from the title of a poem by the German children's writer Boy Lornsen: Der Tintenfisch Paul Oktopus.

According to Sea Life's entertainment director, Daniel Fey, Paul demonstrated intelligence early in life: "There was something about the way he looked at our visitors when they came close to the tank. It was so unusual, so we tried to find out what his special talents were."

The animal rights organisation PETA protested Paul's permanent confinement, citing octopuses' capability of complex thought processes, different personalities, and particular sensitivity to pain. Sea Life Centres responded that it would be dangerous to release him, as he was born in captivity, and was not accustomed to finding food for himself.

Following Paul's rise to fame, businessmen in Carballiño, a community in Galicia, collected about €30,000 for a "transfer fee" to get Paul as main attraction of the local Fiesta del Pulpo festival. Manuel Pazo, a fisherman and head of the local business club, assured people that Paul would be presented alive in a tank and not on the menu. Sea Life rejected the offer nevertheless.

Paul was last checked by staff on 25 October 2010, and was in good health, but the following morning he was found dead. He was aged two-and-a-half, a normal lifespan for the species. His agent, Chris Davies, said "It's a sad day. Paul was rather special but we managed to film Paul before he left this mortal earth". Sea Life Centre manager Stefan Porwoll remembered Paul as an octopus who had "enthused people across every continent".

== Divination ==
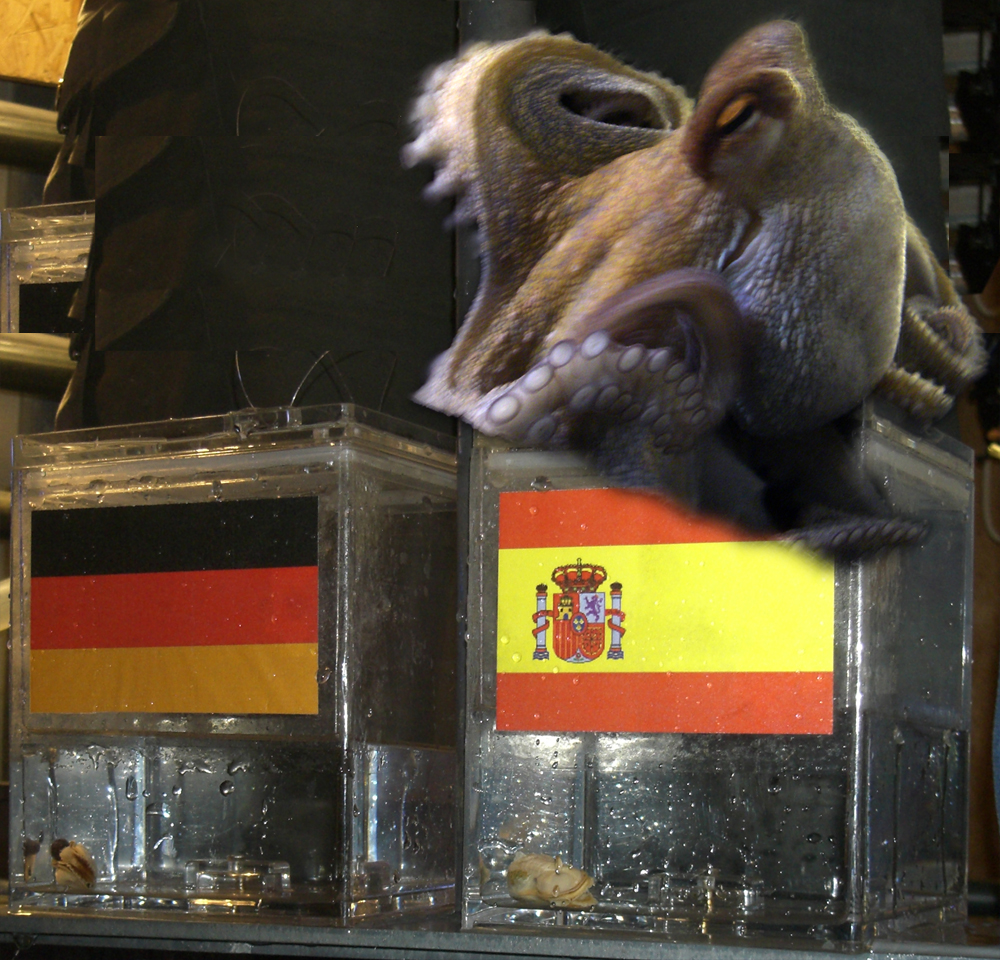
Paul choosing Spain over Germany for his 2010 semi-final prediction

Paul's career as an oracle began during the UEFA Euro 2008 tournament. In the lead-up to Germany's international football matches, Paul was presented with two clear plastic boxes, each containing food: a mussel or an oyster. Each container was marked with the flag of a team, one the flag of Germany, and the other the flag of Germany's opponent. The box which Paul opened first (and ate its contents) was deemed to be the predicted winner of the match. There was no method for Paul to pick a draw, despite this being a possible outcome for group stage matches.

Professor Chris Budd, of the University of Bath, and Professor David Spiegelhalter, of Cambridge University, both compared Paul's success to a run of luck when tossing a coin. Under the hypothesis that Paul was equally likely to choose the winner or the loser of a match, and neglecting the possibility of a draw, he had a 1 in 2 chance of predicting a single result and a 1 in 64 chance of predicting six in a row. This feat would be unlikely to happen by chance alone, but not hugely so. Spiegelhalter points out that there are "other animals that have attempted but failed to predict the outcome of football matches"; it is not remarkable that one animal is more successful than the others, and only the successful animals will gain public attention after the fact.

There was discussion as to whether differences in flags design could have influenced Paul (despite Octopus vulgaris being almost certainly colour blind), or whether he could have been choosing boxes based on differences in their smell.

== Career record ==
Germany (11)

Spain (2)

Serbia (1)

Flags picked by Paul over both competitions

=== UEFA Euro 2008 ===
In UEFA Euro 2008, Paul predicted Germany to win all of their games, a correct prediction in 4 out of 6 cases. He failed to predict their defeats by Croatia in the group stage, and by Spain in the championship's final. (Note: Some later sources reported his success rate at 80%.)

Projections by Paul the Octopus in the UEFA Euro 2008 tournament
Germany's opponent	Stage	Date	Prediction	Result	Outcome
Poland	group stage	8 June 2008	Germany	2–0	Correct
Croatia	group stage	12 June 2008	Germany	1–2	Incorrect
Austria	group stage	16 June 2008	Germany	1–0	Correct
Portugal	quarter-finals	19 June 2008	Germany	3–2	Correct
Turkey	semi-finals	25 June 2008	Germany	3–2	Correct
Spain	final	29 June 2008	Germany	0–1	Incorrect

=== 2010 FIFA World Cup ===
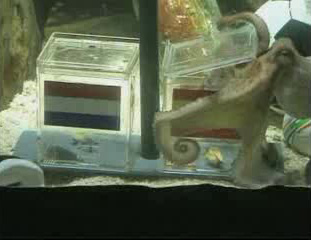
Paul choosing Spain over Netherlands for the final match

Paul's accurate choices for the 2010 World Cup, broadcast live by German news channel n-tv, endowed him with celebrity status. Paul predicted the winners of each of the seven 2010 FIFA World Cup matches that the German team played — against Australia, Serbia, Ghana, England, Argentina, Spain and Uruguay — as well as the tournament's Netherlands vs. Spain final. His prediction that Argentina would lose prompted Argentine chef Nicolas Bedorrou to post an octopus recipe on Facebook.

There are always people who want to eat our octopus but he is not shy and we are here to protect him as well. He will survive.

— Oliver Walenciak (Paul's keeper)

Paul correctly predicted the outcome of the semi-final, by choosing the food in the box marked with the Spanish flag. German supporters drew hope from his incorrect choice for the Germany versus Spain match in the UEFA Euro 2008 but were disappointed. The prediction led to German fans calling for Paul to be eaten. In response, the Spanish Prime Minister José Luis Rodríguez Zapatero offered to send Paul official state protection, and the Industry Minister Miguel Sebastian called for Paul to be given safe haven in Spain.

Paul's notoriety attracted criticism from the President of Iran, Mahmoud Ahmadinejad, who accused him of being a symbol of Western decadence and decay. Ahmadinejad went on to say that "Those who believe in this type of thing cannot be the leaders of the global nations that aspire, like Iran, to human perfection, basing themselves in the love of all sacred values."

Doubts were expressed as to whether "Paul" was actually the same octopus in both 2008 and 2010.

Projections by Paul the Octopus in the 2010 FIFA World Cup
Match	Stage	Date	Prediction	Result	Outcome
Germany vs. Australia	group stage	13 June 2010	Germany	4–0	Correct
Germany vs. Serbia	group stage	18 June 2010	Serbia	0–1	Correct
Ghana vs. Germany	group stage	23 June 2010	Germany	0–1	Correct
Germany vs. England	round of 16	27 June 2010	Germany	4–1	Correct
Argentina vs. Germany	quarter-finals	3 July 2010	Germany	0–4	Correct
Germany vs. Spain	semi-finals	7 July 2010	Spain	0–1	Correct
Uruguay vs. Germany	Match for third place	10 July 2010	Germany	2–3	Correct
Netherlands vs. Spain	final	11 July 2010	Spain	0–1	Correct

=== Similar predictors ===
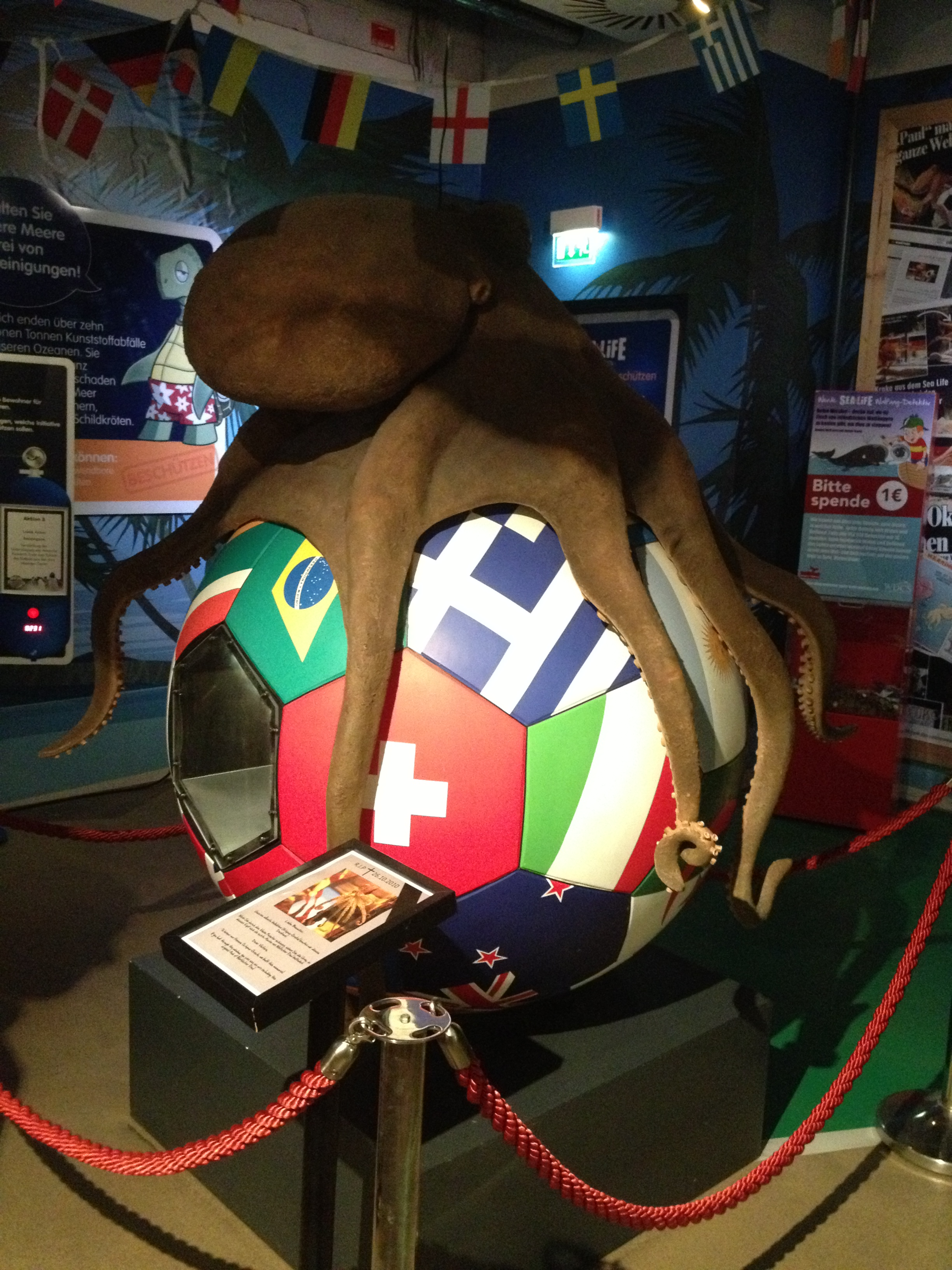
Memorial to Paul at the Sea Life Centre in Oberhausen

Some other German oracles did not fare so well in the World Cup. The animals at the Chemnitz Zoo were wrong on all of Germany's group-stage games, with Leon the porcupine picking Australia, Petty the pygmy hippopotamus spurning Germany's apple-topped pile of hay (instead of Serbia), and Anton the tamarin eating a raisin representing Ghana.

Mani the parakeet of Singapore became famous for correctly predicting the results of all four quarter-final matches. Mani contradicted Paul by picking the Netherlands to win the final, resulting in some media outlets describing the game as an "octopus-versus-parakeet showdown".

Rabio the Octopus, who correctly predicted the results of all of Japan’s group stage games at the 2018 FIFA World Cup, was killed and sent to market on 2 July 2018 by the Japanese fisherman who had caught it. During the 2026 FIFA World Cup, a goldfish in Toronto named Swimbappé was promoted as predicting the outcomes of games.

== Legacy ==
In 2010, uTouchLabs developed an iPhone app called "Ask the Octopus" which is no longer available.

A 2010 Chinese thriller film Kill Octopus Paul depicts Paul's predictions as being part of an international match-fixing scheme.

On 17 June 2014, during the 2014 FIFA World Cup, Paul was featured in a Google "doodle". He was represented as being in Heaven, perched on a billowy bed of clouds and adorned with a halo; when animated, he appeared to vacillate in his predictions for the day's matches. Paul was again featured on 13 July in the doodle for the 2014 final. In that doodle, clicking on the clouds in the upper left brings up an image of Paul, similar to that in the earlier doodle, "cheering" on the final from Heaven. He was also featured in the short film “A Visit from Mascot Verse” during the 2022 FIFA World Cup.
