= Mani the parakeet =

Parakeet serving as an astrologer 'assistant'

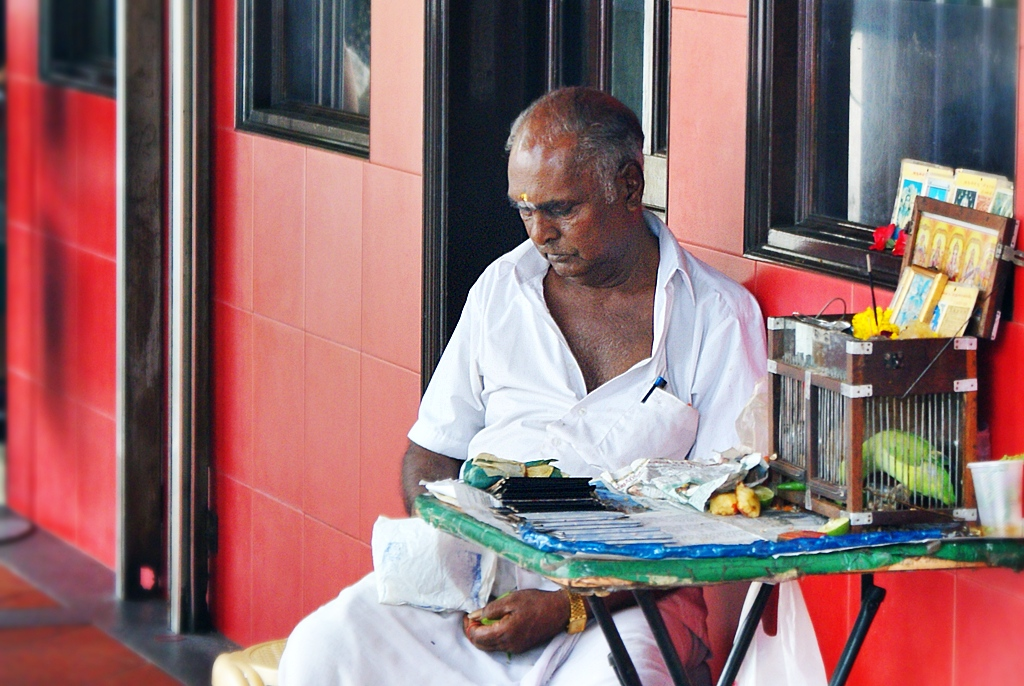
- Owner M. Muniyappan sits with Mani the parakeet in a cage in 2009
- Species: Rose-ringed parakeet (Psittacula krameri)
- Sex: Male
- Hatched: 1997 (age 28–29); Malaysia
- Nationality: Malaysia
- Occupation: Astrologer
- Years active: 2005–
- Known for: Making World Cup football predictions
- Owner: M. Muniyappan

Mani the parakeet (hatched 1997) is a Malaysian-born rose-ringed parakeet who resides in Singapore. He has been an "astrologer assistant" to M. Muniyappan since 2005, working from M. Muniyappan's fortune-telling shop in Little India along Serangoon Road. M. Muniyappan is locally known to make his predictions using a simplified form of cartomancy.

Mani became a celebrity in Singapore, and later internationally, when he picked the correct winners for all of the 2010 FIFA World Cup quarterfinal ties, as well as the Spain–Germany semifinal. However, Mani failed to predict the Spain–Netherlands final by choosing the Netherlands as the winner of the 2010 World Cup. At one point on 5 July 2010, a day before the Uruguay–Netherlands semifinal match, Mani topped Google's "Hot Searches" in Singapore.

Prior to his World Cup stint, Mani and his owner M. Muniyappan, used to see an average of 10 customers a day. Following his World Cup success, this increased to around 10 customers an hour.

== Predictions ==
While Mani typically assisted his owner M. Muniyappan in fortune-telling in day-to-day work, it was his predictions over the matches of the 2010 FIFA World Cup that saw him gain widespread recognition.

According to Singapore's The New Paper, Mani's most contentious pick for the World Cup thus far was underdog, the Netherlands, to beat Brazil. His prediction later proved to be correct.

For the quarterfinals, Mani guessed the four winners of the matches correctly – Spain, Germany, Uruguay, and the Netherlands. In the semi-finals, he predicted that Uruguay would beat the Netherlands and Spain would defeat Germany, thereby leading to a Uruguay vs. Spain final. Mani went on further to predict that Spain would be champions.

However, the Uruguay vs. Netherlands prediction turned out to be wrong, with Netherlands progressing on to the final. As a result, Mani made a new prediction for the World Cup Final between the Netherlands and Spain. It tipped a Dutch win over Spain. On the other hand, fellow oracle star Paul the Octopus of Germany went for a Spanish victory, resulted in some media outlets describing the game as an octopus-versus-parakeet proxy showdown. However, Spain defeated the Netherlands 1–0.

== Results ==
Date	Tournament	Stage	Match			Prediction	Results	Outcome
2 July 2010	World Cup 2010	Quarter-finals	Netherlands	v	Brazil	Netherlands	2–1	Correct
2 July 2010	World Cup 2010	Quarter-finals	Uruguay	v	Ghana	Uruguay	4–2 (PSO)	Correct
3 July 2010	World Cup 2010	Quarter-finals	Argentina	v	Germany	Germany	0–4	Correct
3 July 2010	World Cup 2010	Quarter-finals	Paraguay	v	Spain	Spain	0–1	Correct
6 July 2010	World Cup 2010	Semi-finals	Uruguay	v	Netherlands	Uruguay	2–3	Incorrect
7 July 2010	World Cup 2010	Semi-finals	Germany	v	Spain	Spain	0–1	Correct
11 July 2010	World Cup 2010	Final	Netherlands	v	Spain	Netherlands	0–1	Incorrect

== Method of divination ==
Mani exits his small wooden cage and chooses between two white cards — each punching the flag of the countries of a match that will be played. Mani will pick one of the cards up with his beak and flip it over, revealing the winner for the match.

== International reportage ==
Following his successful stint in predicting the semi-finalists of the World Cup, Mani rose to international stardom. The New Paper of Singapore was the first to feature his story and predictions, and newspapers from across the globe soon followed suit – partially as a result of The New Paper's frequent broadcast on the bird. News agencies including the AFP and Associated Press ran reports on Mani, alongside newspapers such as The Guardian, and American magazine Vanity Fair.

Mani's story is closely aligned with that of Paul the Octopus, who had 100% accuracy in his predictions for the tournament. The two animals chose opposing sides for the final, which caused some media outlets to term it as an octopus vs. parakeet showdown. Mani chose the Netherlands, who lost to Paul's choice of Spain.

== See also ==
- List of individual birds
- Paul the Octopus
