= List of C.D. Primeiro de Agosto players =

Clube Desportivo Primeiro de Agosto is an Angolan football (soccer) club based in Luanda, Angola and plays at Estádio 11 de Novembro. The club was established in 1977.

== 2020–2021 ==
List of C.D. Primeiro de Agosto players 2020–2021
Nat	J	Nickname	Full name	A	P	F.Z.	Total apps & Gls		
Nat	J	Nickname	Full name	A	P	2021	Total apps & Gls		
Nat	J	Nickname	Full name	A	P	^{C}	^{S}	^{A}	^{G}
(Democratic Republic of the Congo)	25	Asumani	Rachidi Asumani	25	MF	2021	0		
(Cameroon)	10	Atouba	Yazid Atouba	28	MF	2021	2	^{20}	^{2}
(Angola)	31	Bito	Camilo Mbule Ngongue	20	MF	2021	1		
(Democratic Republic of the Congo)	4	Bobó	Beaudrick Muselenge Ungenda	32	DF	2021	5	^{139}	^{10}
(Angola)	6	Bonifácio	Bonifácio Francisco Caetano	28	DF	2021	4	^{22}	^{0}
(Angola)	9	Buá	Luvumbo Lourenço Pedro	33	MF	2021	10	^{244}	^{20}
(Angola)	24	Catraio	Zinedine Moisés Catraio	23	MF	2021	3	^{11}	^{0}
(Angola)	7	Cirilo	Cirilo Van-Dúnem da Silva	23	MF	2021	3	^{8}	^{0}
(Angola)	5	Dani	Massunguna Alex Afonso	35	DF	2021	12	^{315}	^{12}
(Angola)	14	Duarte	Fernando Mateus Duarte	21	MF	2021	2	^{2}	^{0}
(Angola)	27	Edmilson	António Dipoco Teodor	20–21	MF	2021	0		
(Republic of the Congo)	17	Giovani	Elvia Giovani Ipamy	25	FW	2021	1	^{2}	^{0}
(Angola)	18	Herenilson	Herenilson Caifalo do Carmo	25	MF	2021	1	^{2}	^{0}
(Angola)	21	Isaac	Isaac Correia da Costa	30	DF	2021	7	^{172}	^{4}
(Angola)	15	Jó	Mariano da Costa Vidal	26	DF	2021	2	^{5}	^{0}
(Angola)	26	Mabululu	Agostinho Cristóvão Paciência	29	FW	2021	3	^{70}	^{36}
(Angola)	16	Macaia	José Macaia Ganga	27	MF	2021	5	^{122}	^{3}
(Angola)	30	Manico	Luís Manico Gonçalves	26	MF	2021	1	^{2}	^{0}
(Angola)	8	Mário	Mário Balbúrdia	24	MF	2021	4	^{70}	^{2}
(Angola)	28	Melono	Melono Muondo Dala	20	FW	2021	4	^{21}	^{3}
(Angola)	2	Mira	Daniel João Zongo Macuenho	30	DF	2021	1	^{2}	^{0}
(Angola)	23	Mona	Nelson Miango Mudile	22	DF	2021	0		
(Democratic Republic of the Congo)	13	Mongo	Kipe Mongo Lompala Bokamba	28	FW	2021	4	^{93}	^{14}
(Honduras)	11	Moya	Brayan Josué Velásquez Moya	26	MF	2021	1	^{3}	^{1}
(Angola)	3	Natael	Natael Paulo Masuekama	28	DF	2021	5	^{84}	^{0}
(Angola)	22	Neblú	Adilson Cipriano da Cruz	28	GK	2021	8	^{81}	^{0}
(Angola)	1	Nsesani	Nsesani Emanuel Simão	19	GK	2021	1	^{DNP}	
(Angola)	19	Paizo	Salomão Manuel Troco	29	DF	2021	10	^{234}	^{7}
(Angola)	12	Tony Cabaça	Adão Joaquim Bango Cabaça	35	GK	2021	13	^{177}	^{0}
(Angola)	20	Zini	Ambrosini António Cabaça Salvador	17	FW	2021	1	^{3}	^{0}
		Opponents							
Years						2021	Total		96

== 2011–2020 ==
List of C.D. Primeiro de Agosto players 2011–2020
Nat	Nickname	Full name	A	P	C.M.	R.F.	Daúto Faquirá (Note: Filemon was sacked on 5/6/2014. Faquirá took over on 5/14/2013.)			Dragan Jović (Note: Jović replaced Faquirá in April 2014.)												Z. Manojlović			Dragan Jović						Total apps & Gls			
Nat	Nickname	Full name	A	P	2011	2012	2013			2014			2015			2016			2017			2018			2018–19			2019–20			Total apps & Gls			
Nat	Nickname	Full name	A	P	6	2	^{#}	^{A}	^{G}	^{#}	^{A}	^{G}	^{#}	^{A}	^{G}	^{#}	^{A}	^{G}	^{#}	^{A}	^{G}	^{#}	^{A}	^{G}	^{#}	^{A}	^{G}	^{#}	^{A}	^{G}	^{S}	^{A}	^{G}	
(Angola)	Aldair	Aldair Domingos	17	MF																								2	^{1(1)}	^{0}	1	^{2}	^{0}	
(Cameroon)	Alfred	Alfred Tabot Mfongang Sarko	26	FW			25	^{3(2)}	^{3}																						1	^{8}	^{3}	
(Democratic Republic of the Congo)	Ali	Abengea Mambani Ali	25	DF	→	3	→																								1	^{6}	^{0}	
(Angola)	Amaro	Amândio Manuel Filipe da Costa	28	MF	24	26	26	^{26}	^{4}	26	^{19(3)}	^{5}	→																		4	^{113}	^{29}	
(Brazil)	Aquino	Anderson Angus Aquino	33	FW																		→			18	^{4(14)}	^{1}	→			1	^{19}	^{1}	
(Angola)	Ary Papel	Manuel David Afonso	26	MF	→	30	30	^{6(10)}	^{0}	30	^{24}	^{14}	30	^{26}	^{12}	30	^{21}	^{12}	→			→			30	^{24(6)}	^{9}	30	^{25(1)}	^{12}	7	^{170}	^{60}	→
(Cameroon)	Atouba	Yazid Atouba	–	MF																					→			18	^{12(6)}	^{2}	↑			
(Angola)	Baby	Valdemar Denso António	21	MF		35	28	^{(3)}	^{0}	→																					2	^{4}	^{0}	
(Zambia)	Banda	Ephraim Banda	26	FW		29																									1	^{7}	^{1}	
(Angola)	Belito Socola	Abelardo Gomes Socola	17	MF		→	–	^{(1)}	^{0}	→																					1	^{2}	^{0}	
(Senegal)	Ben Traoré	Naman Traoré	27	FW						→			28	^{12(8)}	^{7}	→															1	^{20}	^{7}	
(Angola)	Bena	Diveluca Simão Nascimento	28	FW	17	17	→																								7	^{129}	^{55}	
(Democratic Republic of the Congo)	Bobó Ungenda	Beaudrick Muselenge Ungenda	–	DF												→			4	^{38}	^{3}	4	^{33}	^{2}	4	^{33}	^{3}	4	^{31}	^{2}	↑			
(Angola)	Bonifácio Caetano	Bonifácio Francisco Caetano	27	DF															→			6	^{2(2)}	^{0}	6	^{3(1)}	^{0}	6	^{9(2)}	^{0}	↑			
(Angola)	Bruno Jesus	Bruno Manuel de Jesus	22	MF						→			24	^{(2)}	^{0}	24	^{DNP}		24	^{DNP}											3	^{2}	^{0}	
(Angola)	Bruno Nunes	Euclides José Nunes	21	FW	16																										1	^{3}	^{0}	
(Angola)	Buá	Luvumbo Lourenço Pedro	–	MF	9	9	→			9	^{5(21)}	^{4}	9	^{12(10)}	^{1}	9	^{23(2)}	^{2}	9	^{29(8)}	^{3}	9	^{12(22)}	^{3}	9	^{19(12)}	^{2}	9	^{17(11)}	^{1}	↑			
(Angola)	Capuco	Emanuel José Paulo João	26	MF	→	23	→																								1	^{8}	^{0}	
(Angola)	Catraio	Zinedine Moisés Catraio	–	MF												→			25	^{2(2)}	^{0}	25	^{DNP}		→			24	^{3(3)}	^{0}	↑			
(Angola)	Celson Barros	Celson João Barros Costa	26	DF	→	–	→																								1	^{3}	^{0}	
(Zambia)	Chileshe	Jackson Chileshe Chibwe Yokoniya	31	MF	8	8	8	^{24}	^{3}	8	^{7(6)}	^{1}	→																		5	^{132}	^{10}	
(Angola)	Chiwe	Alfredo Cassinda Calunganga	25	DF	–	→																									1	^{3}	^{0}	
(Angola)	Cirilo Silva	Cirilo Van-Dúnem da Silva	22	MF															→			30	^{2(1)}	^{0}	31	^{(2)}	^{0}	7	^{(3)}	^{0}	3	^{8}	^{0}	
(Angola)	Coio	Sebastião António Coio	19	GK												→			22	^{DNP}		→									1	^{DNP}		
(Democratic Republic of the Congo)	Dago	Tshibamba Samu	22	FW																					17	^{10(7)}	^{4}	→			1	^{18}	^{4}	
(Angola)	Dani	Massunguna Alex Afonso	–	DF	5	5	5	^{21}	^{1}	5	^{20}	^{1}	5	^{23}	^{0}	5	^{28}	^{3}	5	^{26}	^{1}	5	^{37}	^{2}	5	^{30}	^{3}	5	^{38}	^{0}	↑			
(Zambia)	Danny Hangunyu	Danny Hangunyu	34	FW	14	→	→			14	^{DNP}																				8			
(Angola)	Dany Traça	Danilson do Carmo Josefino Traça	25	MF	→	16	→																								1	^{10}	^{0}	
(Angola)	David Magalhães	David Dinis Magalhães	31	FW		→	16	^{8(8)}	^{6}	→																					1	^{18}	^{6}	
(Mali)	Diakité	Mourtala Diakité	36	DF									→			3	^{13}	^{0}	→												1	^{13}	^{0}	
(Portugal)	Diogo Rosado	Diogo Jorge Rosado	27	FW												→			6	^{16(8)}	^{5}	→									1	^{23}	^{5}	
(Angola)	Dominique	Signori Dominique Nymi António	22	GK									29	^{3}	^{0}	29	^{28}	^{0}	29	^{4}	^{0}										3	^{37}	^{0}	
(Angola)	Elísio Dala	Elísio Muondo Dala	33	DF	18	18	18	^{2(3)}	^{0}	→																					12			
(Portugal)	Fábio Paím	Fábio Miguel Malheiro Paím	23	MF	6																										1	^{DNP}		
(Angola)	Fernando Duarte	Fernando Duarte		MF																								2	^{1(1)}	^{0}	↑			
(Cape Verde)	Figo	Osvaldo Tavares Oliveira	28	FW			20	^{10(4)}	^{3}	17	^{6(14)}	^{2}																			2	^{35}	^{5}	
(Angola)	Fissy	Alberto Álvaro Paca	29	DF		→	23	^{10(1)}	^{0}	23	^{17(1)}	^{0}	23	^{4(6)}	^{0}	23	^{10(5)}	^{0}	→												4	^{59}	^{0}	
(Angola)	Fofaná	Pedro Cassunda Domingos	29	MF	26	→																									4			
(Angola)	Fofó	Afonso Sebastião Cabungula	24	FW															→			26	^{12(8)}	^{2}	→						1	^{20}	^{2}	
(Angola)	Freddy	Frederico Castro Roque dos Santos	34	FW			23	^{1(3)}	^{0}	→																					1	^{5}	^{1}	
(Angola)	Fuky	Manuel Paulo David	21	MF			27	^{5(2)}	^{0}	→																					1	^{8}	^{0}	
(Angola)	Gelson Dala	Jacinto Muondo Dala	20	FW			32	^{5(2)}	^{2}	27	^{18(3)}	^{10}	27	^{29}	^{10}	27	^{27}	^{23}	→												4	^{89}	^{45}	
(Angola)	Geraldo	Hermenegildo da Costa Paulo Bartolomeu	28	MF									→			11	^{24(2)}	^{7}	11	^{20(8)}	^{13}	11	^{29(4)}	^{9}	11	^{3(1)}	^{2}				4	^{93}	^{31}	
(Angola)	Gogoró	João Ngunza Muanha	23	MF						→			8	^{(7)}	^{0}	8	^{10(3)}	^{3}	8	^{8(12)}	^{2}	8	^{5(3)}	^{0}	→						4	^{48}	^{5}	
(Angola)	Guelor	Anderson Benjamim	30	FW												→			17	^{16(11)}	^{3}	17	^{8(9)}	^{0}	17	^{2}	^{0}				3	^{46}	^{3}	
(Angola)	Gui Cungulo	Eufrânio Carlos da Silva Cungulo	21	MF												→			2	^{(1)}	^{1}	→									1	^{1}	^{1}	
(Angola)	Guilherme Afonso	Guilherme Garcia Afonso	29	FW			24	^{10(2)}	^{6}	29	^{7(8)}	^{4}																			2	^{30}	^{11}	
(Angola)	Hugo Marques	Hugo Miguel Barreto Henriques Marques	28	GK		→	12	^{28}	^{0}	12	^{7}	^{0}	→																		2	^{40}	^{0}	
(Nigeria)	Ibukun	Ibukun Akinfenwa	30	MF						24	^{20(5)}	^{2}	10	^{25(1)}	^{0}	10	^{27(1)}	^{3}	10	^{24(2)}	^{1}	10	^{35(1)}	^{3}	10	^{DNP}		10	^{21(4)}	^{0}	7	^{171}	^{9}	→
(Angola)	Isaac Costa	Isaac Correia da Costa	–	DF						→			21	^{27(3)}	^{0}	21	^{28}	^{3}	21	^{9(1)}	^{1}	21	^{32(3)}	^{0}	21	^{31(1)}	^{0}	21	^{30(1)}	^{0}	↑			
(Democratic Republic of the Congo)	Jacques Bitumba	Jacques Bakulu Bitumba	26	FW															→			20	^{31(9)}	^{12}	20	^{5(5)}	^{1}				2	^{51}	^{13}	
(Zambia)	James Sangala	James Sangala	25	DF	2	→																									3	^{60}	^{3}	
(Democratic Republic of the Congo)	Jiresse	Mawiya Tutona Jiresse	20	FW		11	→			–	^{1}																				2	^{21}	^{7}	
(Angola)	Jó Vidal	Mariano da Costa Vidal	25	DF																					→			15	^{3(2)}	^{0}	1	^{5}	^{0}	
(Angola)	João Martins	João Pedro Pinto Martins	30	FW	10	10	→																								3	^{51}	^{13}	
(Angola)	João Vala	João José Delgado Vala	26	DF	11	→																									2	^{28}	^{0}	
(Angola)	Joãozinho Sequeira	Carlos Alemão Sequeira	17	FW	29																										1	^{1}	^{0}	
(Brazil)	Josimar	Josimar António Virmes	26	FW		–																									1	^{3}	^{0}	
(Angola)	Julião Pucusso	Justo Mateus Pucusso	28	GK	28	–	→			22	^{4(1)}	^{0}	22	^{DNP}		22	^{DNP}		1	^{6}	^{0}	1	^{DNP}		1	^{DNP}		1	^{1}	^{0}	3	^{12}	^{0}	→
(Mozambique)	Jumisse	Eduardo Jumisse	32	MF			→			15	^{25}	^{1}	15	^{12(4)}	^{2}	6	^{27(1)}	^{2}	→												3	^{71}	^{5}	
(Democratic Republic of the Congo)	Kabamba	Musasa Tshatsho Kabamba	31	FW		→	9	^{4(2)}	^{3}																						1	^{9}	^{3}	
(Angola)	Kali	Carlos Manuel Gonçalves Alonso	36	DF	21	21	21	^{28}	^{0}	21	^{11}	^{0}																			5	^{120}	^{3}	
(Democratic Republic of the Congo)	Kalulika	Dieudonné Kalulika	32	MF		→	9	^{11(10)}	^{5}	→																					1	^{22}	^{5}	
(Democratic Republic of the Congo)	Kila	Emmanuel Christian Ngudikama	33	MF																		→			20	^{6}	^{2}	20	^{20(5)}	^{2}	2	^{31}	^{4}	
(Angola)	Kuagica	Kuagica Sebastião Bondo David	24	DF						25	^{29}	^{4}	→																		1	^{32}	^{4}	
(Angola)	Kumaca	Adriano da Costa Mateus Alberto	33	DF	4	4	→																								7			
(Angola)	Lambito	Osvaldo Vasco Carlos	22	GK	12	12	→																								2	^{7}	^{0}	
(Angola)	Leyzller	Leyzller Jorge Lopes de Araújo	26	DF		→	17	^{6}	^{0}	17	^{DNP}		→																		2	^{8}	^{0}	
(Cameroon)	Lionel	Lionel Vera Yombi	26	FW																					→			27	^{9(14)}	^{7}	1	^{23}	^{7}	→
(Angola)	Lito Panzo	Pedro José Panzo	23	MF	→	–																									1	^{2}	^{0}	
(Angola)	Mabululu Paciência	Agostinho Cristóvão Paciência	–	FW																		→			26	^{27(4)}	^{17}	26	^{32(4)}	^{19}	↑			
(Angola)	Macaia	José Macaia Ganga	–	MF												→			16	^{25(6)}	^{1}	16	^{19(6)}	^{0}	16	^{26(4)}	^{2}	16	^{30(2)}	^{0}	↑			
(Angola)	Machado, Manuel	Manuel António Machado	26	DF	19																										1	^{18}	^{1}	
(Angola)	Makiavala	Josemar Makiavala	25	FW									17	^{(1)}	^{0}	17	^{(3)}	^{0}	→												2	^{6}	^{0}	
(Angola)	Mano Calesso	Luís Calesso Ginga	23	MF	→	28	→																								6			
(Angola)	Manucho Diniz	Osvaldo Paulo João Diniz	30	MF	13	13	13	^{23(1)}	^{0}	13	^{26}	^{0}	13	^{22(3)}	^{0}	13	^{5(9)}	^{0}	13	^{1(2)}	^{0}	→									9	^{200}	^{16}	
(Portugal)	Marco Bicho	Marco Paulo Amaral Bicho	31	MF	20	→																									1	^{19}	^{0}	
(Cape Verde)	Marco Soares	Marco Paulo da Silva Soares	31	MF						6	^{2}	^{0}	6	^{2}	^{0}																2	^{4}	^{0}	
(Angola)	Mário Balbúrdia	Mário César Azevedo Alves Balbúrdia	–	MF															→			2	^{16(5)}	^{2}	8	^{13(11)}	^{0}	8	^{19(3)}	^{0}	↑			
(Cape Verde)	Mário Costa	Mário Eugénio Fernando da Costa	28	DF			→			4	^{3}	^{0}	4	^{DNP}		→															2	^{3}	^{0}	
(Angola)	Mateus Galiano	Mateus Galiano da Costa	30	FW			→			11	^{14(7)}	^{5}	11	^{18(6)}	^{10}	→															2	^{48}	^{15}	
(Angola)	Meda Nsiandamba	Vidal Miguel Paulo Nsiandamba	26	MF												→			28	^{25(11)}	^{1}	28	^{2}	^{0}							2	^{38}	^{1}	
(Angola)	Melono	Melono Muondo Dala	–	FW																		14	^{4(4)}	^{1}	28	^{(2)}	^{0}	28	^{1(9)}	^{2}	↑			
(Democratic Republic of the Congo)	Milambo Mutamba	Albert Milambo-Mutamba	32	MF									→			14	^{2(3)}	^{0}	→												1	^{7}	^{0}	
(Angola)	Mingo Bile	Régio Francisco Congo Zalata	32	MF	7	7	7	^{27}	^{2}	7	^{27(1)}	^{0}	7	^{19(6)}	^{2}	7	^{4(13)}	^{0}	7	^{15(9)}	^{2}	7	^{11(7)}	^{0}	7	^{8(7)}	^{0}	→			12			
(Democratic Republic of the Congo)	Mongo	Kipe Mongo Lompala Bokamba	–	FW															→			13	^{33(4)}	^{7}	13	^{28(3)}	^{5}	13	^{13(9)}	^{2}	↑			
(Angola)	Mussumari	Gabriel Frederico Mussumari	27	MF			→			20	^{DNP}		20	^{2(2)}	^{0}																2	^{4}	^{0}	
(Angola)	Nandinho Macamo	Wilson Fernandes Augusto Macamo	27	MF	25	27	→																								2	^{31}	^{2}	
(Angola)	Nandinho Morais	Fernando Manuel Morais	22	MF												→			15	^{DNP}		→									1	^{DNP}		
(Angola)	Nari	Bráulio Adélio de Olim Diniz	28	MF						→			18	^{1(5)}	^{0}	→															1	^{7}	^{0}	
(Angola)	Natael	Natael Paulo Masuekama	–	DF												→			3	^{29(2)}	^{0}	3	^{8(3)}	^{0}	3	^{7(6)}	^{0}	3	^{19(6)}	^{0}	↑			
(Angola)	Ndieu	Ndieu Doune António Massadila	26	DF	→	2	2	^{18(3)}	^{2}	2	^{2(2)}	^{1}	2	^{16(2)}	^{0}	→															4	^{58}	^{3}	
(Burundi)	Ndikumana	Selemani Ndikumana	28	MF									20	^{7(2)}	^{2}	→															1	^{11}	^{2}	
(Angola)	Neblú	Adilson Cipriano da Cruz	–	GK	→	1	1	^{2}	^{0}	1	^{11}	^{0}	1	^{4}	^{0}	→			→			22	^{17}	^{0}	22	^{7}	^{0}	22	^{16}	^{0}	↑			
(Angola)	Nelson da Luz	Nelson Coquenão da Luz	22	MF									→			33	^{2(5)}	^{0}	14	^{26(5)}	^{4}	14	^{3(3)}	^{0}	14	^{10(9)}	^{2}	14	^{12(12)}	^{2}	5	^{88}	^{8}	→
(Angola)	Ngaxi	Francisco Gaspar	24	DF	27																										1	^{4}	^{0}	
(Angola)	Nsesani	Nsesani Emanuel Simão	19	GK																		→			29	^{DNP}		→			1	^{DNP}		
(Angola)	Nuno Cadete	Gerson Agostinho Sebastião Cadete	34	GK															30	^{13(1)}	^{0}	→									1	^{14}	^{0}	
(Portugal)	Nuno Gomes	Nuno Manuel Soares Gomes	31	FW	–																										1	^{6}	^{0}	
(Angola)	Orlando	Valdemar Simão João	24	MF	→	–	→																								1	^{6}	^{0}	
(Angola)	Paizo	Salomão Manuel Troco	–	DF	→	19	19	^{13(4)}	^{1}	19	^{20(6)}	^{2}	19	^{24(1)}	^{1}	19	^{22(4)}	^{0}	19	^{31(2)}	^{0}	19	^{26(3)}	^{0}	19	^{28(1)}	^{2}	19	^{25(4)}	^{1}	↑			
(Angola)	Pataca	Bernardo Fernando Pataca da Silva	23	DF		→	6	^{5(9)}	^{0}	–	^{5}	^{1}	→																		3	^{31}	^{1}	
(Democratic Republic of the Congo)	Patrick Anfumu	Patrick Lembo Anfumu	30	FW									→			18	^{(9)}	^{0}	→												1	^{11}	^{2}	
(Angola)	Pepé Alves	Pedro Correia Alves	19	DF																		28	^{DNP}		–	^{DNP}					1	^{DNP}		
(Angola)	Pepé Marinheiro	Veloso Marinheiro	20	FW	31																										2	^{6}	^{0}	
(Cape Verde)	Rambé	Ramilton Jorge Santos do Rosário	28	FW															27	^{16(13)}	^{12}	→									1	^{29}	^{12}	
(Nigeria)	Razaq	Razaq Akanni Adegbite	26	FW															→			27	^{14(8)}	^{2}	→						1	^{22}	^{2}	
(Angola)	Roger	António Bernardo Feliciano Gomes de Brito	29	MF	15																										7			
(Gabon)	Romaric	Romaric Rogombé	26	FW									→			20	^{(12)}	^{0}	→												1	^{12}	^{0}	
(Democratic Republic of the Congo)	Ruffin	Ruffin Motshumba Ebongo	22	MF	→	–	→																								1	^{2}	^{0}	
(Angola)	Sargento	Antunes Sargento Ekundi	27	DF						→			26	^{19(5)}	^{2}	26	^{16}	^{0}	26	^{16(2)}	^{0}	→									3	^{56}	^{2}	
(Angola)	Show	Manuel Luís da Silva Cafumana	20	MF												→			23	^{20(1)}	^{0}	23	^{30(3)}	^{0}	23	^{31}	^{2}	→			3	^{86}	^{2}	
(Angola)	Sidney	Eduardo Martins Candeias	25	MF	→	15	→																								1	^{12}	^{1}	
(Angola)	Simão Veya	Rosalino Valério Veya	22	DF		→	4	^{2(1)}	^{0}	→																					1	^{6}	^{0}	
(Angola)	Tchitchi	Cláudio Joaquim Segunda Adão	28	MF	→	14	14	^{12(2)}	^{1}	14	^{3(5)}	^{0}	→																		3	^{39}	^{3}	
(Cape Verde)	Tom Tavares	António Sérgio Lopes Tavares	24	MF	23	→																									1	^{11}	^{0}	
(Angola)	Tony Cabaça	Adão Joaquim Bango Cabaça	–	GK	22	22	22			22	^{9}	^{0}	12	^{23}	^{0}	12	^{1}	^{0}	12	^{18}	^{0}	12	^{25(3)}	^{0}	12	^{29}	^{0}	12	^{22}	^{0}	↑			
(Angola)	Vado Dias	Dorivaldo António Dias	31	FW												→			18	^{18(10)}	^{5}	18	^{1(3)}	^{0}							2	^{31}	^{5}	
(Angola)	Vado Kitenga	Osvaldo Pedro de Jesus Kitenga	23	DF									→			4	^{(1)}	^{0}	→												1	^{2}	^{0}	
(Angola)	Vanilson	Vanilson Tita Zéu	20	MF												→			24	^{(2)}	^{0}	24	^{DNP}		24	^{1(4)}	^{1}				3	^{7}	^{1}	
(Angola)	Wilson Alegre	Wilson Edgar Pereira Alegre	27	GK	1		→																								2	^{52}	^{0}	
(Nigeria)	Yisa	Kehinde Yisa Anifowoshe	27	DF															→			15	^{16(9)}	^{0}	15	^{6(2)}	^{0}	→			2	^{31}	^{0}	
(Angola)	Zé Ventura	Osvaldo Paulo Ventura	23	DF																		→			2	^{DNP}					1	^{DNP}		
(Angola)	Zito Luvumbo	Zito André Sebastião Luvumbo	18	FW																					11	^{5}	^{2}	11	^{20(6)}	^{5}	2	^{32}	^{7}	→
(Democratic Republic of the Congo)	Zola Matumona	Zola Matumona	32	FW		→	10	^{19(2)}	^{2}																						1	^{26}	^{2}	
Opponents									^{3}			^{2}			^{2}			^{0}			^{2}			^{2}			^{1}			^{1}			^{13}	
Years					2011	2012	2013		47	2014		59	2015		51	2016		60	2017		60	2018		47	2018–19		61	2019–20		58	Total		442	

== 2001–2010 ==
List of C.D. Primeiro de Agosto players 2001–2010 # Angola league winner
Nat	Nickname	Full name	A	P	W.C.	J.C.	D.C.	D.N.	Jan Brouwer			V.M.	H.C.	L.D.	
Nat	Nickname	Full name	A	P	2001	2002	2003	2004	2005	2006	2007	2008	2009	2010	
Nat	Nickname	Full name	A	P	7	2	4	6	4	1	2	2	4	3	
(Angola)	Abel	Abel Mudilo Dora		DF	2001	–	2003	2004	2005	2006	2007				
(Angola)	Alberto	Alberto Da Silva Munhelele	25	MF						→	2007	20	20	→	
(Angola)	André	Mateus André		FW							2007				
(Angola)	Ângelo	Ângelo Sebastião Manuel	25	GK						→	2007	12	→		
(Angola)	António			MF				2004							
(Angola)	Avex	Avelino Eduardo António Craque	25	MF							→	10	10		
(Angola)	Bebeto	Abel Miguel Vieira	25	FW				→	2005	2006	→				
(Angola)	Bemberé	Eduardo Ventura Augusto		FW			2003	→							
(Angola)	Bena	Diveluca Simão Nascimento	–	FW					→	2006	2007	17	17	17	↑
(Angola)	Benjamin					–									
(Angola)	Betinho	Alberto Tavares Ferreira	27	FW				2004							
(Democratic Republic of the Congo)	Bhana			FW				2004							
(Angola)	Bocandé	Carlos Bernardo Fuma		DF							2007				
(Angola)	Bolingó	Edvaldo Elvis Calado de Pina	25	MF									→	11	
(Angola)	Bondoso			MF		–	→								
(Angola)	Castigo	Eduardo de Andrade Cancelinhas	27	DF									→	20	
(Angola)	Chicangala	André Chicangala	27	FW			2003								
(Zambia)	Chileshe	Jackson Chileshe Chibwe Yokoniya	–	MF										8	↑
(Angola)	Chinês	José António Amaro Inácio	26	DF							→	21	21		
(Angola)	Dani Massunguna	Massunguna Alex Afonso	–	DF									→	5	↑
(Zambia)	Danny	Danny Hangunyu	–	FW					2005	2006	2007	14	14	14	↑
(Angola)	Dé	Hélder José Sérgio	31	MF	2001	9	2003	2004	2005						
(Angola)	Dedas	Benjamim Francisco de Oliveira	23	DF	2001	25	2003	2004	2005	→					
(Angola)	Delgado	Luís Manuel Ferreira Delgado	26	DF		→	2003	2004	2005						
(Namibia)	Dockies	Riaan Cloete	24	MF								→	5		
(Angola)	Efemberg	José Manuel Catendi	24	MF								→	19	→	
(Democratic Republic of the Congo)	Ekobolo	Ramazani Ewuizi	31	GK	2001	12	2003	2004	→						
(Angola)	Elísio	Elísio Muondo Dala	–	DF		18	2003	2004	2005	2006	2007	18	18	18	↑
(Angola)	Elson	Elson de Sousa Augusto		MF				→	2005	→					
(Angola)	Esquadra	Álvaro Manuel Ngunza Cambongo	22	DF								27	27		
(Zambia)	Fichite	Dudley Fichite	27	FW				→	2005						
(Angola)	Filipe Nzanza	Filipe Nzanza	36	MF	2001	22	2003	2004	2005						
(Angola)	Fofaná	Pedro Cassunda Domingos	–	MF							→	29	29	29	↑
(Angola)	Gazeta	Augusto Maneco Victor	31	MF					→	2006	2007	→			
(Angola)	Gil Martins	Gil Martins dos Santos	22	MF					2005	→					
(Angola)	Goliath	Matumona Lundala	31	GK	2001	1	2003								
(Angola)	Gomes	Manuel Lourenço Gomes											25		
(Angola)	Hélder Vicente	Hélder de Jesus Serafim Vicente	27	DF	→	–	→								
(Zambia)	Harry Milanzi	Harry Milanzi	30	FW					2005	2006	2007	12	→		
(Zambia)	Ian Bakala	Ian Bakala	28	FW				→	2005	2006	2007	24	→		
(Angola)	Isaac	Isaac Boelua André Lokuli	24	FW	2001										
(Angola)	Jacó	Hermenegildo Pimentel Bravo da Rosa	23	FW	2001										
(Malawi)	James Sangala	James Sangala	–	DF									2	2	↑
(Angola)	João Martins	João Pedro Pinto Martins	–	FW									→	10	↑
(Angola)	João Vala	João José Delgado Vala	–	DF										24	↑
(Angola)	Joãozinho	João Artur Machado	29	DF	2001	26	2003	2004	2005	2006	2007	26	26	26	→
(Angola)	Jonas †	Carlos Emanuel Romeu Lima	32	MF		→	2003	2004	→						
(Angola)	Josemar	Jorge de Carvalho Tomás		GK					→	2006					
(Angola)	Julião †	Julião Kutonda	39	DF	2001			2004							
(Angola)	Kalala	Wilson Quizanga Esteves		DF		3	2003	2004	→						
(Angola)	Kali	Carlos Manuel Gonçalves Alonso	–	DF										21	↑
	Kalusha †	Manianga Banza	24			–									
(Angola)	Kito	António Francisco Correia	23							2006					
(Angola)	Kumaca	Adriano da Costa Mateus Alberto	–	DF					→	2006	2007	4	4	4	↑
(Namibia)	Letu	Abraham Letu Shatimwene	21	MF						→	2007	→			
(Namibia)	Levis	Levis Petros Swartbooi	24	FW					→	2006	2007	11	→		
(Angola)	Locó	Manuel Armindo Morais Cange	24	DF					→	2006	2007	13	→		
(Angola)	Loló	Lourenço Tomás Cuxixima	25	FW	2001	14	→	2004			2007				
(Angola)	Love	Arsénio Sebastião Cabungula	31	FW						→	2007	7	7	7	
(Angola)	Lucas	Lucas Orlando Sabino Simão		FW	2001	17	2003	2004							
(Zambia)	Lungo	Michael Lungo		DF					2005						
(Democratic Republic of the Congo)	Mamale	Emeka Esanga Mamale	27	MF				2004							
(Angola)	Manaja	Gilberto Armindo Cange				–									
(Angola)	Maninho Loide	Loide Manuel Mendes	22	MF			2003	→							
(Angola)	Mano Calesso	Luís Calesso Ginga	–	MF						2006	2007	28	28	28	↑
(Angola)	Manucho	Osvaldo Paulo João Diniz	–	MF								→	13	13	↑
(Angola)	Mauro	Manuel Lourenço Gomes		FW								→	–		
(Angola)	Mbinda	Afonso Lando da Silva Zilungo		DF					2005	2006					
(Democratic Republic of the Congo)	Mbiyavanga	Mbiyavanga Kapela	32	MF						→	2007	25			
(Angola)	Mena	Daniel Mena Kuanzambi		GK			2003								
(Angola)	Mendes	Mário Olegário Pascoal Ginga	28	MF						→	2007	6	→		
(Angola)	Mendonça	António Manuel Viana Mendonça	28	MF										25	
(Angola)	Mingo Bile	Régio Francisco Congo Zalata	–	DF							→	3	3	3	↑
(Angola)	Mingo	Osvaldo António Ngunza Ngola	22	MF					2005						
(Angola)	Mingo Sanda	Domingos Fernando Sanda	28	DF								→	6	6	→
(Angola)	Miro	Belmiro da Conceição Pereira	25	DF						→	2007	2			
(Zambia)	Misheck	Misheck Lungu	25	DF				→	2005						
(Angola)	Moche	Moche Iyeti	29	GK				→	2005	→					
(Angola)	Moisés II	Moisés Augusto de Almeida	33	MF	2001	20	2003								
(Angola)	Moreno	Ruben Paulo Moreno	23	DF						2006	2007				
(Democratic Republic of the Congo)	Musumari	Biske Musumari		FW			2003	2004	2005						
(Angola)	Nando			DF			2003	2004							
(Angola)	Nelo	Manuel Augusto da Silva Bernardo	30	DF					→	2006					
(Angola)	Neruda	Stélvio de Assis Vieira de Olim		MF						2006	→				
(Angola)	Neto	António João Neto	32	DF		5	2003								
(Angola)	Nuno Neto	Nuno Miguel de Menezes Neto	22	DF				→	2005	→					
(Nigeria)	Pascal	Pascal Kondaponi	30	FW										30	
(Angola)	Pataca	Bernardo Fernando Pataca da Silva	–	DF									24	→	↑
(Angola)	Patrício	Patrício Lumingo Matundo		FW						2006	2007				
(Zambia)	Patrick	Patrick Kabamba Mpesa Monji		FW										19	
(Angola)	Pedro	Pedro da Cruz Rodrigo		DF	2001	21	2003	2004							
(Angola)	Pepe			MF					2005						
(Zambia)	Phiri	Adubelo Phiri	25	DF							→	30	→		
(Angola)	Pilolas	José Olívio Andrade Pereira	24	FW								→	23	→	
(Brazil)	Pirolito	Henrique Pirolito		FW				2004							
(Angola)	Pitchú			FW						2006					
(Angola)	Pitchú	Tubi Landu	28	GK						2006	2007	23	1		
(South Africa)	Ramaphoko	Philimon Ramaphoko Jr		MF									16	→	
(Angola)	Riquinho	Henrique Agostinho Morais Sebastião	25	FW					→	2006	→				
(Angola)	Roger	António Bernardo Feliciano Gomes de Brito	–	MF					2005	2006	2007	15	15	15	↑
(Brazil)	Rômulo	Rômulo Marques Macedo	21	FW					→	2006					
(Angola)	Rubian	Bernardo José Mulombo	21	GK								→	12	12	→
(Angola)	Sotto †	António Virgílio Sotto-Mayor	24	MF		19	2003	2004	2005	→					
(Angola)	Stélvio	Stélvio Rosa da Cruz	17	MF										27	→
(Angola)	Sting	Diogo José Mateus Pascoal		FW		–	2003	2004	2005						
(Angola)	Stopirrá	Edgar Jerónimo	27	MF	2001	10	2003	2004	2005	→					
(Angola)	Tatacho			GK			2003	→							
(Angola)	Tembua	Tetembua Quirino d’Almeida Neto		FW					2005	→					
(Angola)	Tião	Sebastião Félix Pereira de Carvalho	28	DF						2006	2007	19	→		
(Democratic Republic of the Congo)	Tokala	Paulin Tokala Kombe	28	GK			→	2004	2005	→					
(Angola)	Tony Cabaça	Adão Joaquim Bango Cabaça	–	GK								22	22	22	↑
(Democratic Republic of the Congo)	Tuabi	Richard Tuabi Kasende	25	FW								→	11		
(Angola)	Vado	Osvaldo Fernando Jorge	20	MF			2003		2005	2006	2007	→			
(Angola)	Vemba	Osvaldo Bruno Francisco Coxe	23	DF	2001	–	2003	2004	2005						
(Angola)	Vicy			MF				2004							
(Angola)	Wilson	Wilson Edgar Pereira Alegre	–	GK									→	1	↑
(Angola)	Yano	Herculano Cahossi Frederico	24	FW			2003								
(Angola)	Zé Augusto	José Augusto de Oliveira Gomes	25	MF			→	2004	2005	2006	2007	8	8	→	
Years					2001	2002	2003	2004	2005	2006	2007	2008	2009	2010	

== 1991–2000 ==
List of C.D. Primeiro de Agosto players 1991–2000 # Angola league winner
Nat	Nickname	Full name	A	P	D. Condić		Djalma Cavalcante			Mário Calado		Ndunguidi		M.C.*	
Nat	Nickname	Full name	A	P	1991	1992	1993	1994	1995	1996	1997	1998	1999	2000	
Nat	Nickname	Full name	A	P	1	1	4	5	3	1	4	1	1	4	
(Angola)	Abel	Abel Mudilo Dora	–	DF										2000	↑
(Democratic Republic of the Congo)	Agó	Augusto Matelle Lukikana		FW								17			
(Angola)	Alfa												→	2000	
(Angola)	Almeida			MF									1999		
(Angola)	Arsénio	Carlos Manuel Arsénio Ribeiro	28		1991	1992									
(Angola)	Assis	Francisco Vicente Assis	24	MF			1993	1994	1995	8	1997	8	1999	→	
(Angola)	Barbosa †	António Sebastião Barbosa	31	MF	1991	1992									
(Angola)	Bifex †	João Manuel Cardoso	21						1995	1996					
(Angola)	Bolefo †	João Bolefo	28	DF	1991	1992	1993	→		1996	1997				
(Angola)	Castella	Martinho Joaquim Castella Quessongo	28	DF					→	11	1997	1998	→		
(Angola)	Corola	José Francisco de Carvalho	24	MF	1991	1992	1993	1994	→						
(Angola)	Dé	Hélder José Sérgio	–	MF						→	1997	1998	1999	2000	↑
(Angola)	Dedas	Benjamim Francisco de Oliveira	–	DF									1999	2000	↑
(Democratic Republic of the Congo)	Ekobolo	Ramazani Ewuizi	–	GK									1999	2000	↑
(Angola)	Filipe	Filipe Nzanza	–	MF							→	1998	1999	2000	↑
(Angola)	Goliath	Matumona Lundala	–	GK							1997	1	1999		↑
(Angola)	Gonçalves		25	DF					1995	2	1997	1998	1999		
(Cape Verde)	Hélder Cruz	Hélder Cruz	26	GK						1996		1998		→	
(Angola)	Hélder Vicente	Hélder de Jesus Serafim Vicente	–	DF			1993	1994	1995	1996	1997	4		2000	↑
(Angola)	Isaac	Boelua Lokuli	–	FW							1997	1998	1999	2000	↑
(Angola)	Ismael		20	DF								1998			
(Angola)	Ivo	Ivo Raimundo Traça	31	DF	1991	1992									
(Angola)	Joãozinho						1993								
(Angola)	Joãozinho	João Artur Machado	–	DF										2000	↑
(Angola)	Jorge Andrade	Jorge Andrade		FW						→	1997	→			
(Angola)	Jorginho	Jorge Fernando Cabral Lopes	27	MF								→	1999	2000	
(Angola)	Julião †	Julião Kutonda	–	DF						→	1997	13	1999	2000	↑
(Angola)	Kialunguila			DF								1998			
(Angola)	Kiss †	Eugénio Fernandes	30	DF	1991	1992	1993	1994	1995	1996	1997	1998	→		
(Angola)	Langa	Alfredo da Costa Batila Manuel	26	MF										2000	→
(Angola)	Loth	Manuel António de Jesus Loth	34	MF	1991	1992	1993								
(Angola)	Lucau	João Lucau	25	MF	1991										
(Angola)	Luís Carlos	Luís Pedro Tavares Pereira									→	1998			
(Democratic Republic of the Congo)	Makita										1997				
(Angola)	Manda											1998			
(Angola)	Maninho Loide	Loide Manuel Mendes	–	MF									1999		↑
(Democratic Republic of the Congo)	Mara		24	FW								→	1999	2000	
(Angola)	Mateus Fuidimau	Mateus Fuidimau	27	MF	1991	1992	1993		1995	1996	1997	→			
(Angola)	Mbila	Sebastião Garcia	27	MF	1991	1992	1993	1994	→						
(Angola)	Mendonça	António Manuel Viana Mendonça	–	MF							→	14	1999	→	↑
(Angola)	Mfede			DF								1998			
(Angola)	Milonga	Francisco Capita Milonga	28	MF					→	1996					
(Angola)	Moisés I	Moisés Arsénio		FW			1993	1994	1995	1996	1997	9		2000	
(Angola)	Moisés II	Moisés Augusto de Almeida	–	DF						→	1997	1998	1999	2000	↑
(Angola)	Muanza	Muanza Teka		FW	1991	1992	1993	1994	1995	1996	1997	11	1999		
(Angola)	Muembe			MF										2000	
(Cameroon)	Mulendi													2000	
(Angola)	Ndisso	João Ndisso Manuel	36	FW	1991	1992	1993	1994	1995	1996	1997				
(Angola)	Ndola	Ndola Alberto	25	DF										2000	
(Angola)	Nelo †	Manuel Lopes		DF	1991										
(Angola)	Nelo			MF								15		2000	
(Angola)	Nelo Jorge			DF			1993		1995	1996					
(Angola)	Neto	António João Neto	–	DF	1991	1992	1993	1994	1995	1996	1997	5	1999	2000	↑
(Angola)	Nhanga	Ernesto Francisco Guedes Kanhanga	26	MF				→	1995	1996	→				
(Democratic Republic of the Congo)	Nsilulu	Makaya Nsilulu	21	MF						→	1997	18	→		
(Angola)	Ntomas			GK	1991		1993		1995	1	1997	→			
(Democratic Republic of the Congo)	Nzalambila	Nsiala Nzalambila		FW								1998	1999	2000	
(Angola)	Pedro	Pedro da Cruz Rodrigo	–	DF					1995	7	1997	21	1999	2000	↑
(Angola)	Pena	Pedro Morais Paulo Zanga	18	FW						1996		29			
(Angola)	Quim Faria	Baptista Lionel Faria	27					→	1995	1996	1997	→			
(Angola)	Rabolé	Hélder António Rabolé	25	DF	1991	1992									
(Angola)	Roberto			DF			1993	→							
(Angola)	Roque	Leopoldino Lito Neto	27	DF						1996	1997				
(Angola)	Russo †	José Neves		DF	1991	1992	1993	1994	→						
(Angola)	Serginho			FW			1993			1996	1997				
(Angola)	Stopirrá	Edgar Jerónimo	–	MF						1996	1997	3	1999	2000	↑
(Angola)	Teófilo	Teófilo Borges Moniz	27				1993								
(Angola)	Valentim	Valentim Francisco Neto		MF	1991	1992	1993	→							
(Angola)	Velho			DF		1992	1993	→							
(Angola)	Vieira Dias	José Vieira Dias Paulino do Carmo	35	FW	1991	1992	1993								
(Angola)	Xavier	Paulo Xavier	19	MF						3		1998			
(Angola)	Zacarias	Walter dos Santos Zacarias	30	MF		1992	1993	1994	→						
(Angola)	Zé Gordo	Faustino Fernando da Cruz	27	GK	1991	1992	1993	→							
Years					1991	1992	1993	1994	1995	1996	1997	1998	1999	2000	

== 1977–1990 ==
List of C.D. Primeiro de Agosto players 1977–1990 # Angola league winner
Nat	Nickname	Full name	A	P	N. Berardinelli			I.R.	J.D.	M.I.	M.I.	C.A.	P.R.	C.A.	João Machado (Note: In the 1988 season, Joca Santinho started as head coach, but on May 22 1988, he was sacked and replaced by João Machado following a heavy 0-6 defeat against arch-rival Petro Luanda.)			D.C.	
Nat	Nickname	Full name	A	P	1977	1978	1979	1980	1981	1982	1983	1984	1985	1986	1987	1988	1989	1990	
Nat	Nickname	Full name	A	P	–	–	1	1	1	2	2	8	8	4	2	3	3	3	
(Angola)	Adérito	Adérito do Rosário Barreto	21						1981	1982									
(Angola)	Agostinho	Joaquim Félix Feliciano	26	DF		1978	1979	1980	1981										
(Angola)	Alves	Francisco Carlos de Abreu	35	FW				1980	1981	1982	1983	1984	1985						
(Angola)	Amândio	Amândio dos Santos Eugênio Fernandes	26	MF			1979	1980	1981	1982	1983	1984	1985						
(Angola)	Amaral	Amaral Aleixo	22	FW											1987				
(Angola)	Ângelo †	Ângelo Manuel da Silva	29	GK	1977	1978	1979	1980	1981	1982	1983								
(Angola)	Arsénio	Carlos Manuel Arsénio Ribeiro	–	DF														1990	
(Angola)	Baltazar	Baltazar Pedro											1985						
(Angola)	Barbosa †	António Sebastião Barbosa	–	MF								→	1985	1986	1987				↑
(Angola)	Barros	João Joaquim Barros da Costa	34	FW	1977	1978	1979	1980	1981	1982	1983	1984		1986					
(Angola)	Belchior, Domingos	Domingos Lino Belchior		MF								→	1985	1986					
(Angola)	Belchior dos Santos	Belchior José dos Santos	21										1985						
(Angola)	Benedito			GK									1985						
(Angola)	Bielli †												1985						
(Angola)	Bolefo †	João Bolefo	–	DF														1990	↑
(Angola)	Bolinhas			DF										1986					
(Angola)	Botelho									1982									
(Angola)	Brandão	Hamilton Brandão	18	DF											1987				
(Angola)	Bula													1986	1987				
(Angola)	Cali	Carlos Silva		DF											1987				
(Angola)	Capeló	Alberto Paulo Juliana	32	GK					1981	1982	1983	1984	1985	1986	1987			1990	
(Angola)	Cardoso			MF									1985						
(Angola)	Cartaxo			DF		1978		1980											
(Angola)	Catarino	Miguel Romão Portela Júnior	34	DF											1987				
(Angola)	Chico Dinis	Francisco António Dinis Neto	25	DF								→	1985						
(Angola)	Chimalanga †	Jaime Chimalanga da Silva	28	MF	1977	1978	1979	1980											
(Angola)	Chinguito †	Nelson Constantino do Vale	23	FW				→	1981	1982									
(Angola)	Costa	Leonídio Rodrigues da Costa	20	FW					1981	1982									
(Angola)	Degas †	José António Rodrigues	21												1987			1990	
(Angola)	Dinis	Joaquim António Dinis	34	FW				1980	1981										
(Angola)	Docas	Osvaldo Saraiva	16							1982									
(Angola)	Eduardo Machado	Eduardo Rosa Sousa Machado	30	MF								→	1985	1986					
(Angola)	Fula	Hernâni Mateus Fula	20								1983								
(Angola)	Garcia	Pedro Garcia	27	DF			1979	1980											
(Angola)	Horácio			MF				1980											
(Angola)	Isaac	Isaac Joaquim Correia	18	MF					1981	1982									
(Angola)	Ivo	Ivo Raimundo Traça	–	DF				1980	1981	1982	1983	1984	1985			1988	1989	1990	↑
(Angola)	Janeiro	Janeiro Maria		DF														1990	
(Angola)	Januário †	António Leitão Ribeiro Neto		DF				1980											
(Angola)	Joãozinho			DF											1987				
(Angola)	Joaquim			DF									1985	1986	1987			1990	
(Angola)	Julião	Julião Inácio Dias	22	FW		1978	1979	1980	→										
(Angola)	Júlio	Júlio Mendes					1979												
(Angola)	Júnior				1977	1978													
(Angola)	Kelson	José António Quelson	28	DF										1986					
(Angola)	Kiss †	Eugénio Fernandes	–	DF											1987	1988	1989	1990	↑
(Angola)	Kuba	Luís Kuba		DF				1980											
(Angola)	Lenguela †	Mateus Lenguela		DF						1982	1983	1984							
(Angola)	Lito			MF														1990	
(Angola)	Loth	Manuel António de Jesus Loth	–	MF					→	1982	1983	1984							↑
(Angola)	Lourenço	Lourenço Caquinta Chilombo	30	DF		1978	1979	1980	1981	1982	1983	1984	1985						
(Angola)	Lucau	João Lucau	–	MF														1990	↑
(Angola)	Luvambo	Mário José Luvambo	26	FW	1977	1978	1979	1980	→										
(Democratic Republic of the Congo)	Maguy			MF								1984	1985						
(Angola)	Mandinho	Armando Queirós Manuel	22													1988			
(Angola)	Mané	Mateus António Vieira Dias Neto	25	DF							1983	1984	1985	1986	1987				
(Angola)	Manico	João Manuel	29	DF		1978	1979	1980	1981	1982									
(Angola)	Manuel	Manuel Domingos Martins	30	FW									1985	1986	1987			1990	
(Angola)	Mário Brás	Mário Brás		DF						→	1983	1984							
(Angola)	Mascarenhas	Filipe Martins Barbosa de Mascarenhas	28	DF	1977	1978	1979	1980											
(Angola)	Mateus †	Mateus César	29	DF		1978	1979	1980											
(Angola)	Mateus Fuidimau	Mateus Fuidimau	–	MF														1990	↑
(Angola)	Mavuba	António do Nascimento Mafuila Mavuba	31	MF				1980											
(Angola)	Mayele			FW				1980											
(Angola)	Mendes			DF	1977														
(Angola)	Mendinho	António Mendes da Silva	23	MF				1980	1981	→									
(Angola)	Mesquita †	José Mesquita Júnior	29	DF			1979	1980	1981	1982	1983	1984	1985	1986	1987				
(Angola)	Miranda			DF														1990	
(Angola)	Moisés I	Moisés Arsénio	–	FW														1990	↑
(Democratic Republic of the Congo)	Mpassy			FW									1985	1986					
(Angola)	Napoleão †	Napoleão Alfredo Brandão	35	GK	1977	1978	1979	1980	1981	1982	1983	1984	1985	1986					
(Angola)	Ndala	Ndala Manuel	22	FW					→	1982									
(Angola)	Ndisso	João Ndisso Manuel	–	FW														1990	↑
(Angola)	Ndongala †	Ndongala Peca		DF		1978	1979	1980	1981	→									
(Angola)	Ndunguidi	Ndunguidi Gonçalves Daniel	31	MF	1977	1978	1979	1980	1981	1982	1983	1984	1985	1986	1987				
(Angola)	Nelito Kwanza	Manuel Lourenço da Silva	25	MF					1981	1982	1983	1984	1985	1986	1987				
(Angola)	Nelo †	Manuel dos Reis Adriano	–	DF					1981	1982	1983	1984	1985	1986	1987			1990	↑
(Angola)	Nelson †	Nelson das Neves Baptista	22	MF										1986	1987	1988	1989	→	
(Angola)	Neto	António João Neto	–	DF														1990	↑
(Angola)	Ngusu	João Ngusu Mualu	22	DF								1984	1985	1986					
(Angola)	Nicola	Nicola Berardinelli		DF	1977														
(Angola)	Novato †	Pedro Cardoso Vicente	23	DF							1983	1984	1985	1986	1987				
(Angola)	Nsuka †	Melo Nsuka	32	FW				1980	1981	1982	1983	1984	1985	1986	1987			1990	
(Angola)	Ntomas		–	GK														1990	↑
(Angola)	Panzo			GK										1986					
(Angola)	Reis			DF					1981	1982			1985	1986					
(Angola)	Rico †	Henrique Pompeu de Almeida	21	MF										1986	1987				
(Angola)	Rolinha	Manuel da Cunha		DF											1987				
(Angola)	Rosinha	Manuel Neto		GK			1979	1980	→										
(Angola)	Rui Jorge	Rui Jorge Saraiva											1985		1987				
(Angola)	Russo †	José Neves	–	DF														1990	↑
(Angola)	Sabino	Sabino Manuel da Silva	24	FW	1977	1978	1979	1980											
(Angola)	Sansão †	Sansão Miguel Cambiona	21	MF			1979	1980	→										
(Angola)	Simões	Luís Alberto Domingos Simões	25	DF									→	1986	1987				
(Angola)	Suba			MF				1980											
(Angola)	Tandu †	Mendes Tandu Mayela	36	DF				1980	1981	1982	1983	1984	1985						
(Angola)	Tony Estraga	António Almeida Gomes	21	FW											1987				
(Angola)	Túbia	João Pedro da Silva	25	FW		1978	1979	1980											
(Angola)	Valentim	Valentim Francisco Neto	–															1990	↑
(Angola)	Van-Dúnem					1978													
(Angola)	Venant	Pedro Venant Sibo										1984							
(Angola)	Victoriano			MF					1981	1982	1983	1984							
(Angola)	Vieira Dias	José Vieira Dias Paulino do Carmo	–	FW			1979	1980	→	→	1983	1984	1985	1986	1987	1988	1989	1990	↑
(Angola)	Vieira Dias II	Gabriel Vieira Dias	27	FW							1983	→							
(Angola)	Vilela	Manuel Lebre Vilela Júnior	23	GK								1984	1985	1986	1987				
(Angola)	Zé Gordo	Simão Paulo	–	GK														1990	↑
(Angola)	Zé Luís	José Luís Pereira	20	FW			1979												
(Angola)	Zeca †	Manuel Lopes	29	MF	1977	1978	1979	1980	1981	1982	1983	1984							
(Angola)	Zezito	José Bráz								1982									
(Angola)	Zomi	Zomi Bernardo		DF				1980	1981	1982									
Years					1977	1978	1979	1980	1981	1982	1983	1984	1985	1986	1987	1988	1989	1990	

== See also ==
- Category:C.D. Primeiro de Agosto players
- List of C.D. Primeiro de Agosto men's basketball players
- List of C.D. Primeiro de Agosto women's basketball players
- List of Angola international footballers
