= 2016 C.D. Primeiro de Agosto season =

Clube Desportivo Primeiro de Agosto
2016 season
- President: Gen. Carlos Hendrick
- Manager: Dragan Jović (Apr 2014–)
- Stadium: Estádio 11 de Novembro
- Girabola: 1st
- Angola Cup: 1/16
- Top goalscorer: League: Gelson (23); All: Gelson (23)
- Biggest win: Interclube 1–6 1º Agosto (23 Oct 2016)
- Biggest defeat: Rec Caála 2–0 1º Agosto (3 Apr 2016); Kabuscorp 2–0 1º Agosto (14 May 2016)
Home colours	Away colours	Third colours
- All statistics correct as of 2 September 2016.

The 2016 season of Clube Desportivo Primeiro de Agosto is the club's 38th season in the Girabola, the Angolan Premier football League and 38th consecutive season in the top flight of Angolan football. In 2016, the club participated in the Girabola and the Angola Cup.

== Squad information ==
=== Players ===
No.	Nat	Nick	Name	Pos	Date of birth (age)
Goalkeepers
12	(Angola)	Tony Cabaça	Adão Joaquim Bango Cabaça	–	23 April 1986 (aged 30)
22	(Angola)	Julião	Justo Mateus Pucusso	–	1 January 1993 (aged 23)
29	(Angola)	Dominique	António Signori Dominique	–	25 July 1994 (aged 22)
Defenders
3	(Mali)	Diakité	Mourtala Diakité	CB	1 October 1980 (aged 36)
4	(Angola)	Vado	Osvaldo Pedro de Jesus Kitenga	CB	20 May 1993 (aged 23)
5	(Angola)	Dani (c)	Massunguna Alex Afonso	CB	1 May 1986 (aged 30)
19	(Angola)	Paizo	Salomão Manuel Troco	LB	10 May 1992 (aged 24)
21	(Angola)	Isaac	Isaac Correia da Costa	RB	25 April 1991 (aged 25)
23	(Angola)	Fissy	Alberto Álvaro Paca	LB	29 June 1987 (aged 29)
26	(Angola)	Sargento	Antunes Sargento Ekundi	CB	10 January 1989 (aged 27)
Midfielders
6	(Mozambique)	Jumisse	Jumisse	CM	6 June 1984 (aged 32)
7	(Angola)	Mingo Bile	Régio Francisco Congo Zalata	RW	15 June 1987 (aged 29)
8	(Angola)	Gogoró	João Ngunza Muanha	RW	—
9	(Angola)	Buá	Luvumbo Lourenço Pedro	MF	6 September 1988 (aged 28)
10	(Nigeria)	Ibukun	Ibukun Akinfenwa	RM	22 October 1990 (aged 26)
11	(Angola)	Geraldo	Hermenegildo da Costa Paulo Bartolomeu	LW	23 November 1991 (aged 25)
13	(Angola)	Manucho	Osvaldo Paulo João Diniz	RM	4 June 1986 (aged 30)
14	(Democratic Republic of the Congo)	Milambo	Albert Milambo-Mutamba	LM	1 December 1984 (aged 32)
30	(Angola)	Ary Papel	Manuel David Afonso	LW	6 May 1994 (aged 22)
33	(Angola)	Nelson	Nelson Coquenão da Luz	LW	4 February 1998 (aged 18)
Forwards
17	(Angola)	Makiavala	Josemar Makiavala	–	27 March 1991 (aged 25)
18	(Democratic Republic of the Congo)	Patrick	Patrick Lembo Anfumu	–	15 September 1986 (aged 30)
20	(Gabon)	Romaric	Romaric	–	25 November 1990 (aged 26)
27	(Angola)	Gelson	Jacinto Muondo Dala	–	13 July 1996 (aged 20)

=== Staff ===
Nat	Name	Position(s)	Date of birth (age)
Technical staff
(Bosnia and Herzegovina)	Dragan Jović	Head coach	19 July 1963 (aged 53)
(Bosnia and Herzegovina)	Nedžad Selimović	Assistant coach	8 June 1973 (aged 43)
(Angola)	Filipe Nzanza	Assistant coach	19 May 1969 (aged 47)
(Angola)	Napoleão Brandão	Goalkeeper coach	13 June 1952 (aged 64)
Medical
(Cuba)	Abel Sanz	Physician	–
(Angola)	Leonilde Ferreira	Psychotherapist	–
(Angola)	Jorge Nabais	Fitness coach	–
(Angola)	Feliciano Madalena	Physio	–
(Angola)	Andrade Mendes	Physio	–
Management
(Angola)	Gen. Carlos Hendrick	Chairman	–
(Angola)	Gouveia Sá Miranda	Vice-Chairman	–
(Angola)	José Marcelino	Head of Foot Dept	–
(Angola)	Carlos Alves	Spokesman	–

=== Pre-season transfers ===
No.	Nat	Nick	Name	Pos	Date of Birth (Age)	To
Transfers out
28	(Senegal)	Ben Traoré	Naman Traoré	FW	11 May 1988 (aged 28)	(Portugal) C.D. Gouveia
24	(Angola)	Bruno	Bruno Manuel de Jesus	MF	25 September 1995 (aged 21)	n/a
4	(Cape Verde)	Mário Costa	Mário Eugénio Fernando da Costa	MF	11 October 1987 (aged 29)	(Portugal) Casa Pia
11	(Angola)	Mateus Galiano	Mateus Galiano da Costa	FW	19 June 1984 (aged 32)	(Portugal) F.C. Arouca
18	(Angola)	Nari	Bráulio Adélio de Olim Diniz	MF	30 April 1987 (aged 29)	(Angola) Kabuscorp
1	(Angola)	Neblú	Adilson Cipriano da Cruz	GK	16 December 1993 (aged 23)	(Angola) Interclube
2	(Angola)	Ndieu	Ndieu Doune António Massadila	DF	10 December 1989 (aged 27)	(Angola) Progresso Sambizanga
Transfers in
3	(Mali)	Diakité	Mourtala Diakité	MF	1 October 1980 (aged 36)	(Brazil) Benfica Luanda
11	(Angola)	Geraldo	Hermenegildo da C.P. Bartolomeu	MF	23 November 1991 (aged 25)	(Brazil) A.C. Goianiense
14	(Democratic Republic of the Congo)	Milambo	Albert Milambo-Mutamba	MF	1 December 1984 (aged 32)	(Angola) Progresso Sambizanga
33	(Angola)	Nelson	Nelson Coquenão da Luz	MF	4 February 1998 (aged 18)	(Angola) Junior team
18	(Angola)	Patrick	Patrick Lembo Anfunu	FW	15 September 1986 (aged 30)	(Angola) Kabuscorp
20	(Gabon)	Romaric	Romaric Rogombé	FW	25 November 1990 (aged 26)	(Gabon) Akanda FC
4	(Angola)	Vado	Osvaldo P.J. Kitenga	DF	20 May 1993 (aged 23)	(Angola) Petro Luanda

== Overview ==
Competition	First match	Last match	Final position	Record							
Competition	First match	Last match	Final position	Pld	W	D	L	GF	GA	GD	Win %
Girabola	19 February 2016	5 November 2016	Winner	30	20	6	4	60	22	+38	66.67
Angola Cup	19 June 2016		Preliminary round	1	0	0	1	0	2	−2	0.00
Total				31	20	6	5	60	24	+36	64.52

Last updated: 5 November 2016

== Angolan League ==
=== League table ===
Pos	Team	Pld	W	D	L	GF	GA	GD	Pts	Qualification or relegation
1	Primeiro de Agosto (C)	30	20	6	4	60	22	+38	66	Qualification for Champions League
2	Petro de Luanda	30	19	7	4	37	14	+23	64	
3	Recreativo do Libolo	30	17	9	4	49	26	+23	60	
4	Progresso LS	30	13	7	10	25	20	+5	46	
5	Kabuscorp	30	13	7	10	30	24	+6	46	

Updated to match(es) played on 5 November 2016. Source: Girabola.com
Rules for classification: 1) Points; 2) Head-to-head points; 3) Head-to-head goal difference; 4) Goal difference; 5) Goals scored; 6) Fair-play points; 7) Play-off.
(C) Champions

=== Results ===
==== Results summary ====
Overall								Home						Away					
Pld	W	D	L	GF	GA	GD	Pts	W	D	L	GF	GA	GD	W	D	L	GF	GA	GD
30	20	6	4	60	22	+38	66	13	2	0	36	10	+26	7	4	4	24	12	+12

Last updated: 4 November 2016.

==== Results by round ====
Round	1	2	3	4	5	6	7	8	9	10	11	12	13	14	15	16	17	18	19	20	21	22	23	24	25	26	27	28	29	30
Ground	A	H	H	A	H	A	H	A	H	A	H	A	H	A	H	H	A	A	H	A	H	A	H	A	H	A	H	A	H	A
Result	W	W	W	W	W	L	W	D	W	W	W	L	D	W	W	W	D	D	W	L	W	D	D	W	W	W	W	W	W	L
Position	1	1	1	1	1	1	1	1	1	1	1	1	1	1	1	1	1	1	1	1	1	1	1	1	1	1	1	1	1	1

Updated to match(es) played on 5 November 2016. Source: www.girabola.com
A = Away; H = Home; W = Win; D = Draw; L = Loss

=== Match details ===
Fri, 19 Feb 2016 01	Benfica de Luanda	0–2	1º de Agosto	Coqueiros, Luanda
18:00 WAT (UTC+01:00)	Vado (yellow card) 22'; Manuel (yellow card) 36'; Savané (red card) 55'	Report	Jumisse (yellow card) 23'; Geraldo (yellow card) 32' (goal) 49'; Gelson 81'	Attendance: 12,000; Referee: Romualdo Baltazar; Jerson Emiliano, Estanislau Guedes
Note: Dominique / Dani (c), Isaac, Paizo, Sargento / Geraldo (substituted off) 72', Buá (substituted off) 84', Ibukun, Jumisse (substituted off) 90+4' / Ary, Gelson — M.Bile (substituted on) 72', Milambo (substituted on) 84', Manucho (substituted on) 90+4'

Sun, 28 Feb 2016 02	1º de Agosto	3–0	Progresso	11 de Novembro, Luanda
18:00 WAT (UTC+01:00)	Jumisse (yellow card) 25'; Gelson 40', 90'; Ibukun 61'; Ary (red card) 90'	Report	Anastácio (yellow card) 27'; Brazuca (yellow card) 68'; N'Dieu (yellow card) 76'	Attendance: 2.000; Referee: José Álvaro; Rosário Cassinda, Pedro Nguelengue
Note: Dominique / Dani (c), Isaac, Paizo, Sargento / Ibukun, Jumisse, Milambo (substituted off) 45', M.Bile (substituted off) 45' / Ary, Gelson — Geraldo (substituted on) 45', Manucho (substituted on) 45'

Sat, 05 March 2016 03	1º de Agosto	2–0	4 de Abril	11 de Novembro, Luanda
18:00 WAT (UTC+01)	Geraldo 18'; Isaac 45+1'; Jumisse (yellow card) 90'		Gui (yellow card) 34'; Lelo (red card) 72'	Referee: Paulo Talaia; Mário Andrade, Judith Mestre
Note: Dominique / Dani (c), Fissy, Isaac, Sargento / Geraldo (substituted off) 71', Ibukun, Jumisse (substituted off) 90', Manucho (substituted off) 69' / Gelson, Paizo — Mingo Bile (substituted on) 69', Buá (substituted on) 71', Nelson (substituted on) 90'

Sat, 12 March 2016 04	Académica do Lobito	1–3	1º de Agosto	Estádio do Buraco, Lobito
15:30 WAT (UTC+1)	Nelito 43'		Buá 11' (yellow card) 15' (yellow-red card) 61'; Gelson 16', 31'	Referee: Mauro de Oliveira; Luís Matos, Domingos Francisco
Note: Dominique / Dani (c), Fissy, Isaac, Sargento / Buá, Geraldo, Ibukun, Jumisse / Ary (substituted off) 90+2', Gelson (substituted off) 90+1' — Patrick (substituted on) 90+1', Manucho (substituted on) 90+2'

Sun, 20 March 2016 05	1º de Agosto	3–1	Progresso LS	11 de Novembro, Luanda
18:00 WAT (UTC+1)	Dani 46' (yellow card) 60'; Ary 87'; Patrick 90+3'		Bodunha (yellow card) 66'; Tshibuabua 81'	Referee: Inácio Rangel; Elias Calei, Emiliano Livongue
Note: Dominique / Dani, Fissy (substituted off) 46', Isaac, Sargento / Geraldo (substituted off) 64', Ibukun, Jumisse, Manucho (substituted off) 83' / Ary, Gelson — Paizo (substituted on) 46', Romaric (substituted on) 64', Patrick (substituted on) 83'

Sun, 3 Apr 2016 06	Rec da Caála	2–0	1º de Agosto	Mártires da Canhala, Caála
15:00 WAT (UTC+1)	Landry 78'; Zeca 86'	Report	Jumisse (yellow card) 76'; Ibukun (yellow card) 86'	Attendance: 12.000; Referee: Osvaldo Félix; José Félix, Sebastião da Silva
Note: Dominique / Dani, Isaac, Paizo, Sargento / Geraldo (substituted off) 45', Buá (substituted off) 60', Ibukun, Jumisse (substituted off) 82' / Ary, Gelson — Romaric (substituted on) 45', Patrick (substituted on) 60', M.Bile (substituted on) 82'

Sun, 10 Apr 2016 07	1º de Agosto	3–1	Rec do Libolo	11 de Novembro, Luanda
18:00 WAT (UTC+1)	Gelson 32', 61', 86'; Dominique (yellow card) 63'; Isaac (yellow card) 73'; Sargento (yellow card) 74'; Dani (yellow card) 75'	Report	Diawara 89'; Fredy (yellow card) 66'; Dany (yellow card) 82'	Referee: José Álvaro; Jerson Emiliano, Estanislau Guedes
Note: Dominique / Dani, Fissy, Isaac, Sargento / Geraldo (substituted off) 64', Buá (substituted off) 78', Ibukun, Jumisse / Ary, Gelson (substituted off) 90' — M.Bile (substituted on) 64', Manucho (substituted on) 78', Patrick (substituted on) 90'

Sun, 24 Apr 2016 09	1º de Agosto	2–1	Porcelana FC	11 de Novembro, Luanda
18:00 WAT (UTC+1)	Isaac (yellow card) 10'; Ary 36'; Buá (yellow card) 54'; Ibukun 61'	Report	Viola (yellow card) 32'; Makuntima (yellow card) 45'; Djemba 58'; Alexandre (yellow card) 70'	Attendance: 3.000; Referee: José Maxia; Diogo João, Flávio Dias
Note: Dominique / Dani, Fissy, Isaac, Sargento / Geraldo (substituted off) 67', Buá (substituted off) 69', Ibukun, Jumisse / Ary (substituted off) 90', Gelson — Patrick (substituted on) 67', M.Bile (substituted on) 69', Paizo (substituted on) 90'

Sun, 1 May 2016 10	1º de Agosto	2–1	Desportivo Huíla	11 de Novembro, Luanda
18:00 WAT (UTC+1)	Isaac 33'; Gelson 90+1'		Mendes 61'	Referee: João Goma; Orlando Pimenta, Luís Sá Miranda
Note: Dominique / Dani, Fissy, Isaac, Sargento / Geraldo (substituted off) 45', Buá (substituted off) 45', Ibukun, Jumisse / Paizo, Gelson — Romaric (substituted on) 45', Milambo (substituted on) 45' (substituted off) 69', Paizo (substituted on) 69'

Sun, 8 May 2016 11	1º de Agosto	3–1	1º de Maio	11 de Novembro, Luanda
18:00 WAT (UTC+1)	Gelson 4', 69' (pen.); Nelson (yellow card) 27'; Geraldo 30'; Ibukun (yellow card) 46'; Dani (yellow card) 48'; Manucho (yellow card) 80'; Vado (yellow card) 89'	Report	Dino (yellow card) 12'; Filipe 51'; Edson (yellow card) 67'; Yeyé (yellow card) 72'	Attendance: 3.000; Referee: Rodrigues Aleixo; Nicodemos Calembela, Paulo Van-Dúnem
Note: Dominique / Dani (c) (substituted off) 57', Isaac, Paizo, Sargento / Buá, Geraldo (substituted off) 81', Ibukun, Manucho / Gelson, Nelson (substituted off) 90+1' — Vado (substituted on) 57', Fissy (substituted on) 81', Romaric (substituted on) 90+1'

Sun, 14 May 2016 12	Kabuscorp	2–0	1º de Agosto	11 de Novembro, Luanda
18:00 WAT (UTC+1)	Mano 12' (yellow card) 33'; Fiston (yellow card) 58'; Trésor 90'; Mário (yellow card) 90+2'		Gelson (yellow card) 28'; Ary (yellow card) 49'; Manucho (yellow card) 61'	Attendance: 3.000; Referee: Rodrigues Aleixo; Nicodemos Calembela, Paulo Van-Dúnem
Note: Dominique / Dani (c), Isaac, Paizo, Sargento / Buá (substituted off) 66', Geraldo (substituted off) 66', Ibukun, Manucho (substituted off) 75' / Ary, Gelson — Milambo (substituted on) 66', Romaric (substituted on) 66', Jumisse (substituted on) 75'

Sun, 22 May 2016 13	1º de Agosto	3–3	Interclube	11 de Novembro, Luanda
15:00 WAT (UTC+1)	Gelson 7'; Ary 10'; Ibukun 23'	Report	Cachi 36' (yellow card) 77'; Pirolito (yellow card) 49'; Nelson (yellow card) 82'; Moco 86'; Paty 90'	Attendance: 2.500; Referee: João Goma; Luís Sá Miranda, Orlando Pimenta
Note: Dominique / Dani (c), Fissy, Isaac, Sargento / Buá, Geraldo (substituted off) 69', Ibukun, Jumisse / Ary (substituted off) 76', Gelson — Romaric (substituted on) 69', Paizo (substituted on) 76'

Fri, 27 May 2016 14	ASA	0–3	1º de Agosto	Coqueiros, Luanda
18:00 WAT (UTC+1)	Johnson (yellow card) 33'; Gerry (yellow card) 51' (yellow-red card) 86'; Kialunda (red card) 70'		Geraldo 43'; Gelson (yellow card) 27' (goal) 65', 70'	Attendance: 2.000; Referee: António Dungula; Tito Capingala, José Silva
Note: Dominique / Dani (c), Isaac, Paizo, Sargento / Buá (substituted off) 86', Geraldo, Ibukun, Jumisse / Gelson (substituted off) 77', Nelson (substituted off) 77' — Makiavala (substituted on) 77', M.Bile (substituted on) 77', Manucho (substituted on) 86'

Sat, 11 Jun 2016 15	1º de Agosto	1–0	Petro Atlético	11 de Novembro, Luanda
18:00 WAT (UTC+1)	Isaac 3'; Paizo (yellow card) 44'; Sargento (yellow card) 60'; Buá (yellow card) 79'	Report	Jiresse (yellow card) 42'; Job (yellow card) 64'; Wilson (yellow card) 75'	Attendance: 15.000; Referee: Osvaldo Felix; Sebastião Silva, José Felix
Note: Dominique / Dani (c), Isaac, Paizo, Sargento / Geraldo (substituted off) 85', Buá (substituted off) 90+2', Ibukun, Jumisse / Ary (substituted off) 73', Gelson — M.Bile (substituted on) 73', Fissy (substituted on) 85', Manucho (substituted on) 90+2'

Wed, 15 Jun 2016 08	Sagrada Esperança	0–0	1º de Agosto	Sagrada Esperança, Dundo
15:00 WAT (UTC+1)	Oliveira (yellow card) 17'			Referee: Benjamin Andrade; Bernabé Ngulo, Judith Mestre
Note: Dominique / Dani (c), Isaac, Paizo, Sargento / Ary, Ibukun, Jumisse, Makiavala (substituted off) 46' / Gelson, Geraldo — Buá (substituted on) 46'

Sat, 9 Jul 2016 16	1º de Agosto	2–1	Benfica Luanda	11 de Novembro, Luanda
18:00 WAT (UTC+1)	Gelson 11', 32'; Sargento (yellow card) 55'; Sargento (yellow card) 60'; Diakité (yellow card) 67'	Report	Baby (yellow card) 12'; Vado (yellow card) 12'; Gomito II (yellow card) 30'; Jeferson (yellow card) 30'; Douglas 41'	Attendance: 1.500; Referee: António Dungula; Tito Capingala, José Silva
Note: Dominique / Diakité, Fissy, Isaac, Sargento / Ibukun, Jumisse, Geraldo (substituted off) 75', Buá (substituted off) 90+6' / Gelson, Gogoró (substituted off) 64' — Romaric (substituted on) 64', M.Bile (substituted on) 75', Manucho (substituted on) 90+6'

Wed, 17 Jul 2016 17	Progresso	1–1	1º de Agosto	Cidadela, Luanda
15:00 WAT (UTC+1)	Yano 23'	Report	Geraldo 13'; Diakité (yellow card) 80'	Attendance: 3.000; Referee: Paulo Sérgio; Tomás Lima, Paulo Jacinto
Note: Dominique / Dani (c), Diakité, Isaac, Paizo / Buá (substituted off) 53', Geraldo (substituted off) 59', Ibukun, Jumisse / Gelson, Gogoró (substituted off) 45' — Nelson (substituted on) 45', Patrick (substituted on) 53', M.Bile (substituted on) 59'

Sat, 23 Jul 2016 18	4 de Abril	0–0	1º de Agosto	Cidadela, Luanda
15:00 WAT (UTC+1)	Kizombé (yellow card) 30'; Cadiata (yellow card) 50'	Report	Paizo (yellow card) 20'; Dani (yellow card) 40'; Dominique (yellow card) 60'	Attendance: 3.000; Referee: Ailton Carmelino; Ivanildo Lopes, Evanildo Martins
Note: Dominique / Dani (c), Diakité, Isaac, Paizo / Ibukun, Jumisse (substituted off) 46', Geraldo (substituted off) 70', Milambo (substituted off) 83' / Gelson, Gogoró (substituted off) 45' — Ary (substituted on) 46', Patrick (substituted on) 70', Makiavala (substituted on) 83'

Sun, 31 Jul 2016 19	1º de Agosto	5–0	Académica do Lobito	11 de Novembro, Luanda
18:00 WAT (UTC+1)	Dani 28'; Ary 52', 61'; Gelson 55', 90'			Attendance: 3.000; Referee: Ailton Carmelino; Ivanildo Lopes, Evanildo Martins
Note: Dominique / Dani (c), Diakité, Isaac, Paizo / Buá, Ibukun, Jumisse, Geraldo / Ary, Gelson

Sat, 6 Aug 2016 20	Progresso LS	1–0	1º de Agosto	Mangueiras, Saurimo
15:00 WAT (UTC+1)	Chileshe (yellow card) 20'; Wilson (yellow card) 28'; Vally (yellow card) 37'; Norberto 79'; Atunako (yellow card) 87'	Report	Sargento (yellow card) 50'	Attendance: 7.000; Referee: Rodrigues Aleixo; Nicodemos Calembela, Paulo Van-Dúnem
Note: Dominique / Dani (c), M.Bile, Paizo, Sargento / Buá, Ibukun, Geraldo (substituted off) 74', Jumisse (substituted off) 85' / Ary, Gelson — Romaric (substituted on) 74', Gogoró (substituted on) 85'

Sun, 14 Aug 2016 21	1º de Agosto	1–0	Rec da Caála	11 de Novembro, Luanda
18:00 WAT (UTC+1)	Dani 10'; Ary (yellow card) 74'	Report	Adilson (yellow card) 26'	Referee: José Álvaro; Estanislau Guedes, Pedro Alberto
Note: Dominique / Dani (c), Isaac, Paizo, Sargento / Buá (substituted off) 46', Ibukun, Geraldo (substituted off) 85', Jumisse / Ary (substituted off) 75', Gelson — Patrick (substituted on) 46', Gogoró (substituted on) 75', Milambo (substituted on) 85'

Sat, 20 Aug 2016 22	Rec do Libolo	0–0	1º de Agosto	Estádio Municipal, Calulo
15:00 WAT (UTC+1)	Erivaldo (yellow card) 33'; Jaime (yellow card) 37'; Sidnei (yellow card) 38'	Report	Jumisse (yellow card) 28'	Attendance: 5.000; Referee: Mauro de Oliveira; Luís Mateus, Domingos Francisco
Note: Dominique / Dani (c), Diakité, Isaac, Paizo / Ibukun, Jumisse, Geraldo (substituted off) 61', Gogoró (substituted off) 66' / Ary, Gelson — Nelson (substituted on) 61', Buá (substituted on) 66'

Sun, 11 Sep 2016 23	1º de Agosto	1–1	Sagrada Esperança	11 de Novembro, Luanda
18:00 WAT (UTC+1)	Gelson 9'; Buá (yellow card) 54'	Report	Guedes 7'; Depaiza (yellow card) 21'; Capuco (yellow card) 45+2'; Yuri (yellow card) 89'; Rolli (yellow card) 90'	Referee: Airton Carmelino; Ivanildo Lopes, Evanildo Martins
Note: Dominique / Dani (c), Diakité, Isaac, Paizo / Ibukun, Jumisse, Buá (substituted off) , Geraldo (substituted off) / Ary, Gelson — M.Bile (substituted on) , Gogoró (substituted on)

Sun, 18 Sep 2016 24	Porcelana FC	1–2	1º de Agosto	Santos Dinis, Ndalatando
15:00 WAT (UTC+1)	Lara (yellow card) 17'; Megue 43'; Pedro (yellow card) 70'	Report	18' (pen.) Geraldo; (yellow card) 22' Dominique; 56' Patrick; (yellow card) 52' Jumisse; (yellow card) 73' Ibukun	Referee: Armando Silva; Miguel Luvumbo, Manuel Lobe
Note: Porcelana played behind closed doors due to a previous round penalty Dominique / Dani (c), Diakité, Isaac, Paizo / Buá, Jumisse, M.Bile (substituted off) 58', Gogoró (substituted off) 68' / Ary (substituted off) 42', Geraldo — Patrick (substituted on) 42', Romaric (substituted on) 58', Ibukun (substituted on) 68'

Sun, 25 Sep 2016 25	Desportivo Huíla	1–4	1º de Agosto	Estádio do Ferrovia, Lubango
18:00 WAT (UTC+1)	Severino (yellow card) 45'; Dany 54' (yellow card) 57' (yellow-red card) 85'	Report	Ary 19', 86'; Gogoró 26', 44'; Dominique (yellow card) 30'; Manucho (yellow card) 79'	Attendance: 5.000; Referee: Nuno Eduardo; Manuel Benguela, Nílton Armando
Note: Dominique / Dani (c), Diakité, Paizo, Isaac (substituted off) 59' / Buá, Gogoró, Jumisse, Manucho / Ary, Geraldo (substituted off) 72' — M.Bile (substituted on) 59', Nelson (substituted on) 72'

Sat, 8 Oct 2016 26	1º de Maio	1–3	1º de Agosto	Edelfride Costa, Benguela
15:00 WAT (UTC+1)	Maria Pia 55'; Edson (yellow card) 69'	Report	19' Gelson; (yellow card) 44' Jumisse; 70' (pen.) Geraldo; 85' Ary; (yellow card) 90+1' Dani	Referee: Paulo Sérgio; Tomás Lima, Segunda Tchisseque
Note: Dominique / Dani (c), Diakité, Isaac, Paizo / Ibukun, Jumisse, Gogoró (substituted off) 58', Geraldo (substituted off) 79' / Ary, Gelson (substituted off) 90+7' — Buá (substituted on) 58', M.Bile (substituted on) 79', Nelson (substituted on) 90+7'

Sun, 16 Oct 2016 27	1º de Agosto	2–0	Kabuscorp	11 de Novembro, Luanda
18:00 WAT (UTC+1)	Ibukun (yellow card) 14'; Isaac (yellow card) 29'; Diakité (yellow card) 73'; Ary 75'; Gelson 90+6' (pen.)	Report	(yellow card) 7' Nandinho; (yellow card) 36' Magola; (yellow card) 90' Meda; (yellow card) 90+5' Estória	Attendance: 10.000; Referee: Inácio Rangel; Estanislau Guedes, Elias Kalei
Note: Dominique / Dani (c), Diakité, Isaac, Paizo (substituted off) 86' / Ibukun, Jumisse, Gogoró (substituted off) 65', Buá (substituted off) 90+1' / Ary, Gelson — Patrick (substituted on) 65', Fissy (substituted on) 86', Manucho (substituted on) 90+1'

Sun, 23 Oct 2016 28	Interclube	1–6	1º de Agosto	22 de Junho, Luanda
15:30 WAT (UTC+1)	Christ (yellow card) 5'; Valdez (yellow card) 38'; Paz (yellow card) 72'; Mabululu 88'	Report	17', 24' Jumisse; 20', 68' Gelson; 45+1' Ary; 60' Gogoró; (yellow card) 70' Ibukun; (yellow card) 79' Dani	Attendance: 10.000; Referee: Conceição Matias; Celestino Golombole, Infante Pedro
Note: Dominique / Dani (c), Diakité, Isaac, Paizo (substituted off) 62' / Ibukun (substituted off) 74', Jumisse, Gogoró, Buá / Ary (substituted off) 71', Gelson — Fissy (substituted on) 62', M.Bile (substituted on) 71', Manucho (substituted on) 74'

Sat, 29 Oct 2016 29	1º de Agosto	3–0	ASA	11 de Novembro, Luanda
15:30 WAT (UTC+1)	Buá 51'; Ary 88', 90'		(yellow card) 45' Anastácio; (yellow card) 59' Johnson	Referee: João Ngoma; Luís Sá Miranda, Orlando Pimenta
Note: Dominique / Buá, Dani (c), Diakité, Isaac, Fissy / Ibukun, Jumisse (substituted off) 45', Gogoró (substituted off) 45' / Ary, Gelson — Romaric (substituted on) 45', Patrick (substituted on) 45' (substituted off) 81', Nelson (substituted on) 81'

Sat, 05 Nov 2016 30	Petro Atlético	1–0	1º de Agosto	11 de Novembro, Luanda
15:30 WAT (UTC+1)	Herenilson (yellow card) 31'; Azulão 33'; Carlinhos (yellow card) 58'; Mira (yellow card) 72'	Report	(yellow card) 78' Fissy	Attendance: 20.000; Referee: Paulo Talaia; Ricardo Rangel, Ivanildo Lopes
Note: Dominique / Dani (c), Diakité, Isaac, Fissy / Ibukun, Paizo (substituted off) 45', Jumisse (substituted off) 57', Buá (substituted off) 81' / Ary, Gelson — Geraldo (substituted on) 45', Romaric (substituted on) 57', Gogoró (substituted on) 81'

== Angola Cup ==
=== Round of 16 ===
Sun, 19 Jun 2016	1º de Agosto	0–2	Benfica de Luanda	11 de Novembro, Luanda
15:00	Romaric (yellow card) 66'; Dani (yellow card) 90+3'	Report	14' Savané; 37' Gomito II; (yellow card) 72' Mariano	Attendance: 2.000; Referee: Rodrigues Aleixo; Wilson Ntyamba, Ricardo Daniel
Note: Tony / Buá, Dani (c), Isaac, Paizo (substituted off) 45' / Geraldo, Ibukun, Jumisse (substituted off) 45', M.Bile (substituted off) 61' / Gelson — Fissy (substituted on) 45', Romaric (substituted on) 45', Makiavala (substituted on) 61'

== FESA Tournament ==
=== Preliminary round ===
Sat, 27 Aug 2016	1º de Agosto	2–0	Petro Atlético	Coqueiros, Luanda
15:00 WAT (UTC+1)	Diakité (yellow card) 12'; Geraldo 35' (pen.); Ibukun (yellow card) 45'; Etah 54' (o.g.); Paizo (yellow card) 83'	Report	(yellow card) 20' Francis; (yellow card) 35' Lamá; (yellow card) 44' Élio; (yellow card) 58' Miguel	Attendance: 7.000; Referee: Aílton Carmelino; Ivanildo Lopes, Ismael Leitão
Note: Tony / Buá, Dani (c), Isaac, Paizo, Diakité (substituted off) 64' / Manucho, Nelson (substituted off) 45', Geraldo (substituted off) 64', Ibukun (substituted off) 71' / Ary, Gogoró (substituted off) 85' — M.Bile (substituted on) 45', Sargento (substituted on) 64', Bruno (substituted on) 64', Makiavala (substituted on) 85'

=== 1st place match ===
Sun, 28 Aug 2016	1º de Agosto	2–2 (a.e.t.) (4–2 p)	Kabuscorp	Coqueiros, Luanda
18:00 WAT (UTC+1)	Geraldo 51' (pen.); Ary Papel 62'; Dani (yellow card) 88'	Report	35' Mpele Mpele; (yellow card) 39' Pataca; (yellow card) 41' Mano; 81' (pen.) Meda	Attendance: 12.000; Referee: João Goma; Luís Sá Miranda, Fernando Pimenta
	Penalties
	Geraldo (penalty scored); Dani (penalty missed); Ibukun (penalty scored)		(penalty scored) Magola
Note: Dominique / Sargento, Vado, Isaac (substituted off) 45', Diakité (substituted off) 45' / M.Bile, Gogoró, Gui (substituted off) 45', Manucho (substituted off) 45' / Makiavala (substituted off) 45', Patrick (substituted off) 45' — Dani (substituted on) 45', Paizo (substituted on) 45', Geraldo (substituted on) 45', Nelson (substituted on) 45', Ary (substituted on) 45'

== Season statistics ==
=== Total results ===
Overall								Home						Away					
Pld	W	D	L	GF	GA	GD	Pts	W	D	L	GF	GA	GD	W	D	L	GF	GA	GD
31	20	6	5	60	24	+36	66	13	2	1	36	12	+24	7	4	4	24	12	+12

Last updated: 4 November 2016.

=== Appearances and goals ===
No.	Pos	Nat	Player	Total		League		Cup	
No.	Pos	Nat	Player	Apps	Goals	Apps	Goals	Apps	Goals
Goalkeepers
12	GK	(Angola) ANG	Tony	1	0	0	0	1	0
22	GK	(Angola) ANG	Julião	0	0	0	0	0	0
30	GK	(Angola) ANG	Dominique	28	0	28	0	0	0
Defenders
3	DF	(Mali) MLI	Diakité	13	0	13	0	0	0
4	DF	(Angola) ANG	Vado	1	0	0+1	0	0	0
5	DF	(Angola) ANG	Dani	28	3	27	3	1	0
19	DF	(Angola) ANG	Paizo	26	0	21+4	0	1	0
21	DF	(Angola) ANG	Isaac	28	3	27	3	1	0
23	DF	(Angola) ANG	Fissy	15	0	10+4	0	0+1	0
26	DF	(Angola) ANG	Sargento	16	0	16	0	0	0
Midfielders
6	MF	(Mozambique) MOZ	Jumisse	28	2	26+1	2	1	0
7	MF	(Angola) ANG	Mingo Bile	17	0	3+13	0	1	0
8	MF	(Angola) ANG	Gogoró	13	3	10+3	3	0	0
9	MF	(Angola) ANG	Buá	25	2	22+2	2	1	0
10	MF	(Nigeria) NGA	Ibukun	28	3	26+1	3	1	0
11	MF	(Angola) ANG	Geraldo	26	7	23+2	7	1	0
13	MF	(Angola) ANG	Manucho	14	0	5+9	0	0	0
14	MF	(Democratic Republic of the Congo) COD	Milambo	5	0	2+3	0	0	0
30	MF	(Angola) ANG	Ary Papel	21	12	21	12	0	0
33	MF	(Angola) ANG	Nelson	7	0	2+5	0	0	0
Forwards
17	FW	(Angola) ANG	Makiavala	3	0	0+2	0	0+1	0
18	FW	(Democratic Republic of the Congo) COD	Patrick	9	2	0+9	2	0	0
20	FW	(Gabon) GAB	Romaric	12	0	0+11	0	0+1	0
27	FW	(Angola) ANG	Gelson	27	23	26	23	1	0
Total
				308	60	308	60	11	0

Last updated: 5 November 2016
Source: Competitions

=== Scorers ===
As of 30 October 2016

Rank	Name	League		Total	
Rank	Name	Apps	Goals	Apps	Goals
1	(Angola) Gelson		23		23
2	(Angola) Ary		12		12
3	(Angola) Geraldo		7		7
4	(Angola) Gogoró		3		3
4	(Angola) Dani		3		3
4	(Angola) Isaac		3		3
4	(Nigeria) Ibukun		3		3

=== Clean sheets ===
As of 5 November 2016

Rank	Name	League		Cup		Total		%
		Apps	CS	Apps	CS	Apps	CS	
1	(Angola) Dominique	30	12	0	0	30	12	40
2	(Angola) Tony	0	0	1	0	1	0	0
3	(Angola) Julião	0	0	0	0	0	0	
Total			12		0		12	

== See also ==
- List of C.D. Primeiro de Agosto players
