= 2015 C.D. Primeiro de Agosto season =

Clube Desportivo Primeiro de Agosto
2015 season
- President: Gen. Carlos Hendrick
- Manager: Dragan Jović (Apr 2014–)
- Stadium: Estádio 11 de Novembro
- Girabola: 2nd
- Angola Cup: 1/16
- Top goalscorer: League: Ary Papel (12); All: Ary Papel (12)
- Biggest win: 1º Agosto 5–0 ASA (10 May 2015)
- Biggest defeat: Académica 2–0 1º Agosto (22 Feb 2015)
Home colours	Away colours	Third colours
- All statistics correct as of 10 October 2015.

The 2015 season of Clube Desportivo Primeiro de Agosto is the club's 37th season in the Girabola, the Angolan Premier football League and 37th consecutive season in the top flight of Angolan football. In 2015, the club participated in the Girabola and the Angola Cup.

== Squad information ==
The players are:

=== Players ===
No.	Nat	Nick	Name	Pos	Date of birth (age)
Goalkeepers
1	(Angola)	Neblú	Adilson Cipriano da Cruz	–	16 December 1993 (aged 22)
12	(Angola)	Tony Cabaça	Adão Joaquim Bango Cabaça	–	23 April 1986 (aged 29)
22	(Angola)	Julião	Justo Mateus Pucusso	–	1 January 1993 (aged 22)
29	(Angola)	Dominique	António Signori Dominique	–	25 July 1994 (aged 21)
Defenders
2	(Angola)	Ndieu	Ndieu Doune António Massadila	DF	10 December 1989 (aged 26)
4	(Cape Verde)	Mário Costa	Mário Eugénio Fernando da Costa	DF	11 October 1987 (aged 28)
5	(Angola)	Dani (c)	Massunguna Alex Afonso	CB	1 May 1986 (aged 29)
19	(Angola)	Paizo	Salomão Manuel Troco	LB	10 May 1992 (aged 23)
21	(Angola)	Isaac	Isaac Correia da Costa	RB	25 April 1991 (aged 24)
23	(Angola)	Fissy	Alberto Álvaro Paca	LB	29 June 1987 (aged 28)
26	(Angola)	Sargento	Antunes Sargento Ekundi	CB	10 January 1989 (aged 26)
Midfielders
7	(Angola)	Mingo Bile	Régio Francisco Congo Zalata	RW	15 June 1987 (aged 28)
8	(Angola)	Gogoró	João Ngunza Muanha	RW	6 June 1995 (aged 20)
9	(Angola)	Buá	Luvumbo Lourenço Pedro	MF	6 September 1988 (aged 27)
10	(Nigeria)	Ibukun	Ibukun Akinfenwa	RM	22 October 1990 (aged 25)
13	(Angola)	Manucho	Osvaldo Paulo João Diniz	RM	4 June 1986 (aged 29)
15	(Mozambique)	Jumisse	Eduardo Jumisse	LM	6 June 1984 (aged 31)
18	(Angola)	Nari	Bráulio Adélio de Olim Diniz	LM	30 April 1987 (aged 28)
20	(Burundi)	Ndikumana	Selemani Yamin Ndikumana	MF	18 March 1987 (aged 28)
24	(Angola)	Bruno	Bruno Manuel de Jesus	MF	25 September 1995 (aged 20)
30	(Angola)	Ary Papel	Manuel David Afonso	LW	6 May 1994 (aged 21)
Forwards
11	(Angola)	Mateus Galiano	Mateus Galiano da Costa	–	18 June 1984 (aged 31)
17	(Angola)	Makiavala	Josemar Makiavala	–	27 March 1991 (aged 24)
27	(Angola)	Gelson	Jacinto Muondo Dala	–	13 July 1996 (aged 19)
28	(Senegal)	Ben Traoré	Naman Traoré	–	11 May 1988 (aged 27)

=== Staff ===
Nat	Name	Position(s)	Date of birth (age)
Technical staff
(Bosnia and Herzegovina)	Dragan Jović	Head coach	19 July 1963 (aged 53)
(Bosnia and Herzegovina)	Nedžad Selimović	Assistant coach	8 June 1973 (aged 43)
(Angola)	Filipe Nzanza	Assistant coach	19 May 1969 (aged 47)
(Angola)	Napoleão Brandão	Goalkeeper coach	13 June 1952 (aged 64)
Medical
(Cuba)	Abel Sanz	Physician	–
(Angola)	Leonilde Ferreira	Psychotherapist	–
(Angola)	Jorge Nabais	Fitness coach	–
(Angola)	Feliciano Madalena	Physio	–
(Angola)	Andrade Mendes	Physio	–
Management
(Angola)	Gen. Carlos Hendrick	Chairman	–
(Angola)	Gouveia Sá Miranda	Vice-Chairman	–
(Angola)	José Marcelino	Head of Foot Dept	–
(Angola)	Carlos Alves	Spokesman	–

=== Pre-season transfers ===
No.	Nat	Nick	Name	Pos	Date of Birth (Age)	To
Transfers out
8	(Zambia)	Chileshe	Jackson Chileshe Chibwe Yokoniya	MF	14 October 1983 (aged 32)	Progresso da Lunda Sul
12	(Angola)	Hugo Marques	Hugo M. Barreto Henriques Marques	GK	15 January 1986 (aged 29)	Kabuscorp
14	(Angola)	Tchitchi	Cláudio Joaquim Segunda Adão	MF	12 October 1986 (aged 29)	Desportivo da Huíla
17	(Angola)	Leyzller	Leyzller Jorge Lopes de Araújo	DF	29 July 1988 (aged 27)	Recreativo de Huelva
25	(Angola)	Kuagica	Kuagica Sebastião Bondo David	DF	10 August 1990 (aged 25)	Recreativo do Libolo
26	(Angola)	Amaro	Amândio Manuel Filipe da Costa	MF	12 November 1986 (aged 29)	Benfica de Luanda
–	(Angola)	Pataca	Bernardo Fernando Pataca da Silva	DF	6 February 1990 (aged 25)	Recreativo do Libolo
Transfers in
8	(Angola)	Gogoró	João Ngunza Muanha	MF	6 June 1995 (aged 20)	Junior team
21	(Angola)	Isaac	Isaac Correia da Costa	RB	25 April 1991 (aged 24)	Petro de Luanda
26	(Angola)	Sargento	Antunes Sargento Ekundi	CB	10 January 1989 (aged 26)	Desportivo da Huíla

=== Mid-season transfers ===
No.	Nat	Nick	Name	Pos	Date of Birth (Age)	To
Transfers out
20	(Angola)	Mussumari	Gabriel Frederico Mussumari	MF	17 December 1988 (aged 27)	—
28	(Cape Verde)	Marco Soares	Marco Paulo da Silva Soares	MF	16 June 1984 (aged 31)	AEL Limassol
Transfers in
17	(Angola)	Makiavala	Josemar Makiavala	FW	27 March 1991 (aged 24)	RKC Waalwijk
20	(Burundi)	Ndikumana	Selemani Yamin Ndikumana	MF	18 March 1987 (aged 28)	KF Tirana
29	(Angola)	Dominique	Signori Dominique Nymi António	GK	25 July 1994 (aged 21)	FC Le Mont

== Overview ==
Competition	First match	Last match	Final position	Record							
Competition	First match	Last match	Final position	Pld	W	D	L	GF	GA	GD	Win %
Girabola	22 February 2015	10 October 2015	Runner-up	30	17	9	4	51	23	+28	56.67
Angola Cup	16 September 2015		Round of 16	1	0	0	1	0	1	−1	0.00
Total				31	17	9	5	51	24	+27	54.84

Last updated: 10 October 2015

== Angolan League ==
League outcomes:

=== League table ===
Pos	Team	Pld	W	D	L	GF	GA	GD	Pts	Qualification or relegation
1	Recreativo do Libolo (C)	30	16	12	2	44	20	+24	60 (Note: Head-to-head results: 1º de Agosto 1 Rec do Libolo 1; Rec do Libolo 3 1º de Agosto 2.)	Qualification for Champions League
2	Primeiro de Agosto	30	17	9	4	51	23	+28	60	
3	Benfica de Luanda	30	14	11	5	35	23	+12	53	
4	Kabuscorp	30	11	15	4	32	23	+9	48	
5	Interclube	30	11	12	7	34	24	+10	45	

Updated to match(es) played on 10 October 2015. Source: Girabola.com
Rules for classification: 1) Points; 2) Head-to-head points; 3) Head-to-head goal difference; 4) Goal difference; 5) Goals scored; 6) Fair-play points; 7) Play-off.
(C) Champions

=== Match details ===
Match outcomes:

Sun, 22 Feb 2015 01	Académica	2–0	1º de Agosto	Estádio do Buraco, Lobito
15:00 WAT (UTC+1)	Jacek 12'; Cachi 34'	Report		Referee: Rodrigues Aleixo; Rosário Calembela, Nicodemos Calembela

Sat, 28 Feb 2015 03	Bravos Maquis	3–2	1º de Agosto	Mundunduleno, Luena
15:00 WAT (UTC+1)	Quinzinho 2'; Benvindo 43'; Rasca 90+4'	Report	1' Jumisse; 8' Mingo Bile	Referee: Nuno Eduardo; Tito Capingala, Nilton Armando

Sat, 07 Mar 2015 04	1º de Agosto	0–1	Kabuscorp	11 de Novembro, Luanda
00:00 WAT (UTC+1)		Report	90' Mpele Mpele	Referee: Benjamin Andrade; Bernabé Ngulo, Judith Mestre

Sun, 15 Mar 2015 05	Desportivo Huíla	0–0	1º de Agosto	Tundavala, Lubango
00:00 WAT (UTC+1)		Report		Referee: Carlos Silva; Domingos Cordeiro, Manuel Lobe

Sat, 21 March 2015 06	1º de Agosto	2–0	Domant FC	11 de Novembro, Luanda
15:00 WAT (UTC+01)	Gelson 1'; Ben Traoré 40'	Report		Referee: Abel Banda; Rosário Cassinda, Elias Calei

Wed, 01 Apr 2015 01	1º de Agosto	1–1	Rec do Libolo	11 de Novembro, Luanda
15:00 WAT (UTC+1)	Ben Traoré 40'	Report	59' Dário	Referee: Inácio Rangel; Jerson Emiliano, Wilson Ntyamba

Sat, 04 Apr 2015 07	Progresso	0–3	1º de Agosto	Coqueiros, Luanda
15:00 WAT (UTC+1)		Report	38' Ben Traoré; 57' Ary Papel; 60' Gelson	Referee: Romualdo Baltazar; Pedro Alberto, Estanislau Guedes

Sat, 11 Apr 2015 08	1º de Agosto	2–0	Sagrada	11 de Novembro, Luanda
15:00 WAT (UTC+1)	Ben Traoré 35'; Mingo Bile 39'			Referee: Conceição Matias; Infante Pedro, Celestino Golombole

Sat, 18 Apr 2015 09	Sporting	1–2	1º de Agosto	Tafe, Cabinda
15:00 WAT (UTC+1)	Zeca 63'		37' Paizo; 45' Gelson	Referee: Ailton Carmelino; Domingos Cordeiro, Ivanildo Lopes

Sat, 25 Apr 2015 10	1º de Agosto	1–1	Petro Atlético	11 de Novembro, Luanda
15:00 WAT (UTC+1)	Ben Traoré 45' (pen.)	Report	16' Manguxi	Attendance: 30.000; Referee: Romualdo Baltazar; Jerson Emiliano, Wilson Ntyamba

Sat, 02 May 2015 11	Interclube	0–2	1º de Agosto	22 de Junho, Luanda
15:00 WAT (UTC+1)		Report	11' Ben Traoré; 62' Mateus	Referee: José Armando; Pedro Alberto, Estanislau Guedes

Sun, 10 May 2015 12	1º de Agosto	5–0	ASA	11 de Novembro, Luanda
15:00 WAT (UTC+1)	Ben Traoré 4'; Ary Papel 13', 46'; Gaca 60' (o.g.); Jumisse 81'	Report		Referee: Osvaldo Felix; Sebastião da Silva, José Felix

Sat, 16 May 2015 13	Progresso LS	0–0	1º de Agosto	Mangueiras, Saurimo
15:00 WAT (UTC+1)		Report		Referee: Benjamin Andrade; Bernabé Ngulo, Judith Mestre

Sun, 24 May 2015 14	1º de Agosto	1–1	Benfica	11 de Novembro, Luanda
15:00 WAT (UTC+1)	Gelson 57'	Report	38' Gilberto	Referee: Osvaldo Felix; José Felix, Sebastião da Silva

Sun, 31 May 2015 15	Rec da Caála	0–1	1º de Agosto	Mártires da Canhala, Caála
15:00 WAT (UTC+1)		Report	19' Mateus	Referee: António Dungula; Tito Capingala, José Silyia

Sat, 11 Jul 2015 16	Rec do Libolo	3–2	1º de Agosto	Estádio Municipal, Calulo
15:00 WAT (UTC+1)	Diawara 19', 80'; Dany 28'	Report	12' Gelson; 45' (pen.) Ndikumana	Referee: Romualdo Baltazar; Jerson Emiliano, Wilson Ntyamba

Sat, 18 Jul 2015 17	1º de Agosto	1–1	Académica	11 de Novembro, Luanda
15:00 WAT (UTC+1)	Gelson 23'		70' Joca	Referee: Osvaldo Felix; José Felix, Celestino Golombole

Sun, 02 Aug 2015 19	Kabuscorp	1–1	1º de Agosto	11 de Novembro, Luanda
15:00 WAT (UTC+1)	Meyong 24'	Report	15' Ary Papel	Attendance: 30.000; Referee: Benjamin Andrade; Jerson Emiliano, Júlio Lemos

Sat, 08 Aug 2015 20	1º de Agosto	4–1	Desportivo Huíla	11 de Novembro, Luanda
15:00 WAT (UTC+1)	Ary Papel 38', 84'; Ndikumana 59'; Sargento 73'	Report	66' Joãozinho	Referee: Paulo Talaia; Ricardo Daniel, Joaquim Chyio

Wed, 12 Aug 2015 21	Domant FC	2–3	1º de Agosto	Municipal, Caxito
15:00 WAT (UTC+1)	Estória 62'; A.Manfuila 66'	Report	13' Mateus; 53' Gelson; 71' Ary Papel	Referee: Rodrigues Aleixo; Nicodemos Calembela, Francisco Van-Dúnem

Sun, 16 Aug 2015 22	1º de Agosto	2–0	Progresso	11 de Novembro, Luanda
15:00 WAT (UTC+01:00)	Ary Papel 6'; Mateus 39'	Report		Referee: António Dungula; Tito Capingala, José Silyia

Sat, 22 Aug 2015 23	Sagrada	0–0	1º de Agosto	Sagrada Esperança, Dundo
15:00 WAT (UTC+1)		Report		Referee: Inácio Rangel; Estanislau Guedes, Feliciano Tchalo

Wed, 26 Aug 2015 18	1º de Agosto	2–0	Bravos Maquis	11 de Novembro, Luanda
15:00 WAT (UTC+1)	Gelson 18'; Mateus 41'	Report		Referee: Eduardo Oliveira; Luís Mateus, Domingos Francisco

Sun, 30 Aug 2015 24	1º de Agosto	0–0	Sporting	11 de Novembro, Luanda
15:00 WAT (UTC+1)		Report		Referee: Conceição Matias; Infante Pedro, Celestino Golombole

Sat, 12 Sep 2015 25	Petro Atlético	1–2	1º de Agosto	11 de Novembro, Luanda
15:00 WAT (UTC+1)	Job 29'	Report	12' Ary Papel; 36' Sargento	Attendance: 30,000; Referee: Mauro de Oliveira; Júlio Lemos, Luís Mateus

Sun, 20 Sep 2015 26	1º de Agosto	2–0	Interclube	11 de Novembro, Luanda
15:00 WAT (UTC+1)	Mateus 16', 78'	Report		Referee: Ailton Carmelino; Ivanildo Lopes, Evanildo Martins

Sat, 26 Sep 2015 27	ASA	1–2	1º de Agosto	Coqueiros, Luanda
15:00 WAT (UTC+1)	Manuel 7'		64' Gelson; 80' Ary Papel	Referee: Romualdo Baltazar; Wilson Ntyamba, Estanislau Guedes

Wed, 30 Sep 2015 28	1º de Agosto	2–1	Progresso LS	11 de Novembro, Luanda
18:00 WAT (UTC+1)	Gelson 6'; Mateus 30'	Report	46' (o.g.) Sargento	Referee: Osvaldo Felix; Sebastião Dias, José Felix

Sun, 04 Oct 2015 29	Benfica	1–4	1º de Agosto	Edelfride Costa, Benguela
15:00 WAT (UTC+1)	Bena 71'	Report	2', 4' Buá; 50', 62' Mateus	Referee: Osvaldo Felix; Ivanildo Lopes, Evanildo Martins

Sat, 10 Oct 2015 30	1º de Agosto	2–1	Rec da Caála	11 de Novembro, Luanda
15:00 WAT (UTC+1)	Ary Papel 7', 56' (pen.)	Report	16' Paizinho	Referee: José Álvaro; Pedro Alberto, Estanislau Guedes

=== Results ===
==== Results by round ====
Round	1	2	3	4	5	6	7	8	9	10	11	12	13	14	15	16	17	18	19	20	21	22	23	24	25	26	27	28	29	30
Ground	H	A	A	H	A	H	A	H	A	H	A	H	A	H	A	A	H	H	A	H	A	H	A	H	A	H	A	H	A	H
Result	D	L	L	L	D	W	W	W	W	D	W	W	D	D	W	L	D	W	D	W	W	W	D	D	W	W	W	W	W	W
Position																														

Updated to match(es) played on 10 October 2015. Source: www.girabola.com
A = Away; H = Home; W = Win; D = Draw; L = Loss

==== Results overview ====
Win Draw Loss

Team	Home score	Away score
Recreativo do Libolo	1-1	2-3
Académica do Lobito	0-2	1-1
Bravos do Maquis	2–0	2-3
Kabuscorp	0-1	1-1
Desportivo da Huíla	4–1	0-0
Domant FC	2–0	3–2
Progresso do Sambizanga	2–0	3–0
Sagrada Esperança	2–0	0-0
Sporting de Cabinda	0-0	2–1
Petro de Luanda	1-1	2–1
Interclube	2–0	2–0
ASA	5–0	2–1
Progresso LS	2–1	0-0
Benfica de Luanda	1-1	4–1
Recreativo da Caála	2–1	1–0

==== Results summary ====
Overall								Home						Away					
Pld	W	D	L	GF	GA	GD	Pts	W	D	L	GF	GA	GD	W	D	L	GF	GA	GD
30	17	9	4	51	23	+28	60	9	5	1	27	8	+19	8	4	3	24	15	+9

Last updated: 10 October 2015.

== Angola Cup ==
=== Round of 16 ===
Wed, 16 Sep 2015	Rec do Libolo	1–0	1º de Agosto	Estádio Municipal, Calulo
15:00	Fredy 27' (pen.)	Report

== Season statistics ==
=== Appearances and goals ===
No.	Pos	Nat	Player	Total		League		Cup	
No.	Pos	Nat	Player	Apps	Goals	Apps	Goals	Apps	Goals
Goalkeepers
1	GK	(Angola) ANG	Neblú	4	0	4	0	0	0
12	GK	(Angola) ANG	Tony Cabaça	23	0	23	0	0	0
22	GK	(Angola) ANG	Julião	0	0	0	0	0	0
30	GK	(Angola) ANG	Dominique	3	0	3	0	0	0
Defenders
2	DF	(Angola) ANG	Ndieu	18	0	16+2	0	0	0
4	DF	(Cape Verde) CPV	Mário Costa	0	0	0	0	0	0
5	DF	(Angola) ANG	Dani	23	0	23	0	0	0
19	DF	(Angola) ANG	Paizo	25	1	24+1	1	0	0
21	DF	(Angola) ANG	Isaac	30	0	27+3	0	0	0
23	DF	(Angola) ANG	Fissy	10	0	4+6	0	0	0
26	DF	(Angola) ANG	Sargento	24	2	19+5	2	0	0
Midfielders
6	MF	(Cape Verde) CPV	Marco Soares	2	0	2	0	0	0
7	MF	(Angola) ANG	Mingo Bile	25	2	19+6	2	0	0
8	MF	(Angola) ANG	Gogoró	7	0	0+7	0	0	0
9	MF	(Angola) ANG	Buá	22	1	12+10	1	0	0
10	MF	(Nigeria) NGA	Ibukun	26	0	25+1	0	0	0
13	MF	(Angola) ANG	Manucho	25	0	22+3	0	0	0
14	MF	(Democratic Republic of the Congo) COD	Milambo	0	0	0	0	0	0
15	MF	(Mozambique) MOZ	Jumisse	16	2	12+4	2	0	0
18	MF	(Angola) ANG	Nari	6	0	1+5	0	0	0
20	MF	(Angola) ANG	Mussumari	4	0	2+2	0	0	0
24	MF	(Angola) ANG	Bruno Jesus	2	0	0+2	0	0	0
30	MF	(Angola) ANG	Ary Papel	26	12	26	12	0	0
Forwards
11	FW	(Angola) ANG	Mateus Galiano	24	10	18+6	10	0	0
17	FW	(Angola) ANG	Makiavala	1	0	0+1	0	0	0
20	FW	(Burundi) BDI	Ndikumana	9	2	7+2	2	0	0
27	FW	(Angola) ANG	Gelson	29	10	29	10	0	0
28	FW	(Senegal) SEN	Ben Traoré	20	7	12+8	7	0	0
Opponents
15	DF	(Angola) ANG	Gaca	0	1	0	1	0	0
5	DF	(Brazil) BRA	Jeferson	0	1	0	1	0	0
Total
				418	51	330+74	51	11+3	0

Last updated: 10 October 2015
Source: Competitions

=== Scorers ===
As of 10 October 2015

Rank	Name	League	
Rank	Name	Apps	Goals
1	(Angola) Ary Papel	26	12
2	(Angola) Mateus Galiano	18(6)	10
3	(Angola) Gelson	29	10
4	(Senegal) Ben Traoré	12(8)	7
5	(Burundi) Ndikumana	8(2)	2
6	(Mozambique) Jumisse	11(4)	2
7	(Angola) Sargento	19(5)	2
8	(Angola) Mingo Bile	19(6)	2
9	(Angola) Buá	11(10)	1
9	(Angola) Paizo	24(1)	1

=== Clean sheets ===
As of 10 October 2015

Rank	Name	League		%
		Apps	CS	
1	(Angola) Tony Cabaça	23	13	56
2	(Angola) Dominique	3	0	0
3	(Angola) Neblú	4	0	0
Total		30	13	

=== Season progress ===
22/2	28/2	7/3	15/3	21/3	1/4	4/4	11/4	18/4	25/4	2/5	10/5	16/5	24/5	31/5	11/7	18/7	2/8	8/8	12/8	16/8	22/8	26/8	30/8	12/9	16/9	20/9	26/9	30/9	4/10	10/10
ACA	MAQ	KAB	DES	DOM	LIB	PRO	SAG	SCC	PET	INT	ASA	PLS	BEN	CAA	LIB	ACA	KAB	DES	DOM	PRO	SAG	MAQ	SCC	PET	LIB	INT	ASA	PLS	BEN	CAA
Girabola																									AC	Girabola				

== See also ==
- List of C.D. Primeiro de Agosto players
