= Rogombé =

Rogombé is a surname. Notable people with the surname include:

- Romaric Rogombé (born 1990), Gabonese footballer
- Rose Francine Rogombé (1942–2015), Gabonese politician
