= França Ndalu Stadium =

Football stadium in Luanda, Angola

Coordinates: 08°50′28.6902″S 13°14′30.1446″E

- Interactive map of França Ndalu Stadium
- Location: Cassequel, Luanda, Angola
- Owner: Primeiro de Agosto
- Capacity: 20,000

Construction
- Groundbreaking: 2012
- Opened: 2023

Tenant
- Primeiro de Agosto

França Ndalu Stadium is an Angolan football stadium built and owned by Clube Desportivo Primeiro de Agosto and will be the venue for the club's home games in all events that it takes part of.

The stadium is named after Gen. António França, nicknamed "Ndalu" who was a key figure in the club's foundation in 1977.

The 20,000-seat stadium is located in the Cassequel neighborhood, Maianga district, Luanda, Angola. The stadium is only the second private-owned stadium in Luanda, following Interclube's 22 de Junho as the remaining teams based in the capital play in the state-owned 11 de Novembro and Coqueiros.
