= Mandinho =

Angolan football player (born 1966)

Personal information
- Full name: Armando Queirós Manuel
- Date of birth: 10 November 1966 (age 59)
- Place of birth: Luanda, Angola
- Position: Midfielder

Senior career*
Years	Team	Apps	(Gls)
–1989	1º de Agosto		
1990–1993	Negro Rubro		
1993–1994	Hap Kuan		
1994–1995	Negro Rubro		
1995	Guangdong Winnerway		
1996–1997	Lam Pak		
2001–2002	Lam Pak		
2002–2007	Monte Carlo		
2007–2008	Heng Tai		
2010–2011	FC Porto	19+	(1+)
2013	Sporting de Macau		
2014	FC Porto		

International career
1989	Angola	1	(0)
1996–2003	Macau	11	(2)
- * Club domestic league appearances and goals

Armando Queirós Manuel (Chinese: 亞文度l; born 10 November 1966) is a former footballer who played as a midfielder. Born in Angola, he was a Macau international.

== Career ==
In 2010, he signed for Macau top flight side FC Porto after training with Belenenses in the Portuguese top flight. In 2013, Mandinho signed for Macau second-tier club Sporting de Macau, helping them earn promotion to the Macau top flight. On 16 February 2013, he fell unconscious during a 2–0 win over Alfândega.
