= Ivan Ridanović =

Yugoslavian football coach

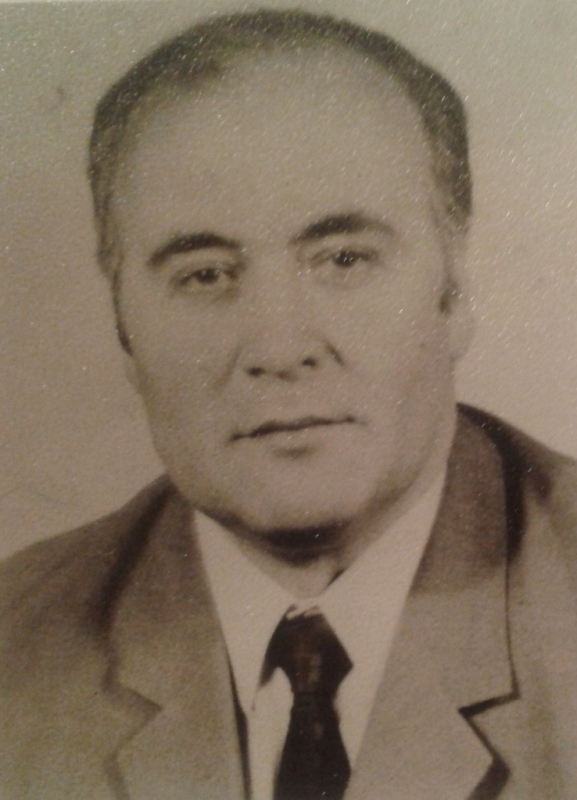

Personal information
- Date of birth: 6 January 1922
- Place of birth: Srpska Crnja, Kingdom of Yugoslavia
- Date of death: 2007 (aged 84–85)

Managerial career
- Years: Team
- 1976–1979: Cameroon
- 1980: Primeiro de Agosto

Ivan Ridanović (6 January 1922 - 2007) was a Yugoslav football coach active in Africa. He managed the Cameroon national team between 1976 and 1979, and won the Angolan Championship with Primeiro de Agosto in 1980.
