= Mourtala Diakité =

Malian footballer (born 1980)

Personal information
- Date of birth: 1 October 1980 (age 46)
- Place of birth: Bamako, Mali
- Height: 1.88 m (6 ft 2 in)
- Position: Defensive midfielder

Senior career*
Years	Team	Apps	(Gls)
1998–2005	Cercle Olympique	155	(24)
2005–2007	Beira-Mar	52	(5)
2007–2008	Boavista	23	(1)
2008	Dinamo Bucharest	6	(0)
2009–2010	Belenenses	32	(2)
2010	Marítimo	9	(1)
2010	Shandong Luneng	20	(0)
2011	Sunray Cave	13	(0)
2012–2013	Belenenses	48	(7)
2014–2015	Benfica Luanda	41	(2)
2016	1º de Agosto	13	(0)
Total		412	(42)

International career
2001–2007	Mali	4	(0)
- * Club domestic league appearances and goals as of 21 May 2017

Mourtala Diakité (born 1 October 1980, in Bamako) is a Malian former professional footballer who played as a defensive midfielder.

== Honours ==
Cercle Olympique

- Malien Cup: 2000, 2002

Shandong Luneng

- Chinese Super League: 2010

Benfica Luanda

- Taça de Angola: 2014

1° de Agosto

- Girabola: 2016
