= Wilson Alegre =

Angolan footballer (born 1984)

Personal information
- Full name: Wilson Edgar Pereira Alegre
- Date of birth: 22 July 1984 (age 42)
- Place of birth: Huambo, Angola
- Height: 1.84 m (6 ft 0 in)
- Position: Goalkeeper

Team information
- Current team: Libolo

Youth career
- 1998–2004: Boavista

Senior career*
Years	Team	Apps	(Gls)
2004–2007	Imortal DC	51	(0)
2007–2008	Portosantense	23	(0)
2008–2009	Chaves	16	(0)
2009	Recreativo Caála	11	(0)
2010–2011	1º de Agosto	9	(0)
2013	Interclube		
2014	Benfica de Luanda		
2015	Académica do Lobito		
2016–2017	Progresso da LS	19	
2018–2019	Libolo	19	(0)
2018–2019	Quarteira S.C.	2	(0)

International career
2010–2012	Angola	6	(0)
Medal record
Men's football
Representing Angola
African Nations Championship
Runner-up	2011 Sudan
- * Club domestic league appearances and goals

Wilson Edgar Pereira Alegre (born 22 July 1984) is an Angolan former professional footballer who played as a goalkeeper.

== Club career ==
Wilson was born in Huambo. He played for Recreativo Caála from 2008, and was their number 1.

== International career ==
Wilson also has been capped by the Angola national team with his debut appearance in early 2010 in a 2010 African Nations Cup warm up game.

He was called up to the 2010 African Nations Cup competition along with other goalkeepers Lamá and Carlos.

== Honours ==
Angola

- African Nations Championship: runner-up 2011
