= Tundavala Stadium =

Multi-purpose stadium in Lubango, Angola

- Interactive map of Tundavala Stadium
- Address: Lubango, Huíla Province; Angola
- Coordinates: 14°56′54.7368″S 13°32′15.6552″E
- Capacity: 20,000

Construction
- Opened: 2010

Tenant
- Clube Desportivo Da Huila

Tundavala National Stadium is a multi-use stadium in Lubango, Huíla Province, Angola. Completed in 2010, it is used mostly for football matches and hosted some events of the 2010 African Cup of Nations. The stadium has a capacity of 20,000 people.

The stadium is also often used by the football club Clube Desportivo Da Huila as their home ground for the professional football league in Angola, called Girabola.
