= Manucho Diniz =

Angolan footballer

Personal information
- Full name: Osvaldo Paulo João Diniz
- Date of birth: 4 June 1986 (age 40)
- Place of birth: Luanda, Angola
- Height: 1.85 m (6 ft 1 in)
- Position: Central midfielder

Team information
- Current team: Desportivo da Huíla

Senior career*
Years	Team	Apps	(Gls)
2010–2017	Primeiro de Agosto		
2018–	Desportivo da Huíla	23	(0)

International career^{‡}
2012–	Angola	26	(0)
- * Club domestic league appearances and goals as of 2 September 2018 ‡ National team caps and goals as of 10 June 2013

Osvaldo Paulo João Diniz (born 4 June 1986) is an Angolan footballer who plays as a central midfielder for Desportivo da Huíla.

In 2018, he was loaned to Desportivo da Huíla in Angola's premier league, the Girabola.
