= Eduardo Jumisse =

Mozambican footballer

Personal information
- Date of birth: 6 June 1984 (age 42)
- Place of birth: Maputo, Mozambique
- Height: 1.84 m (6 ft 0 in)
- Position: Attacking midfielder

Team information
- Current team: Ferroviário Nampula

Senior career*
Years	Team	Apps	(Gls)
2004–2009	Maxaquene Maputo		
2010	Liga Muçulmana Maputo		
2010–2011	Portimonense	14	(1)
2011	→ Ermis Aradippou (loan)	6	(0)
2011–2012	Leixões	25	(4)
2012–2013	FC Vaslui	19	(2)
2013–2014	FC Vaslui II		
2014–2016	Primeiro de Agosto	67	(5)
2017	UD Songo		
2017–2018	Gil Vicente	7	(0)
2018	União Madeira	1	(0)
2018	Cinfães	2	(0)
2019–	Ferroviário Nampula		

International career
2010–2016	Mozambique	23	(0)
- * Club domestic league appearances and goals as of 30 June 2019

Eduardo Jumisse (born June 6, 1984), commonly known as Jumisse, is a Mozambican footballer who plays as an attacking midfielder.

== Honours ==
Liga Muçulmana Maputo

- Championship of Mozambique: 2010

Primeiro de Agosto

- Angolan League: 2016

UD Songo

- Championship of Mozambique: 2017
