= Romaric Rogombé =

Gabonese footballer

Personal information
- Full name: Romaric Rogombé Daga
- Date of birth: 25 November 1990 (age 35)
- Place of birth: Libreville, Gabon
- Position: Forward

Senior career*
Years	Team	Apps	(Gls)
2010–2012	Mangasport	28	(12)
2012–2013	AS Vita Club	19	(7)
2013–2014	Étoile Fréjus Saint-Raphaël	17	(9)
2014–2015	AC Léopards	8	(2)
2016	1º de Agosto		

International career^{‡}
2012–	Gabon	8	(7)
- * Club domestic league appearances and goals as of 12 January 2015 ‡ National team caps and goals as of 12 January 2015

Romaric Rogombé (born 25 November 1990) is a Gabonese professional footballer who currently plays as a forward. At the moment he plays for AC Léopards in the Congo Premier League.

== Honours ==
AS Vita Club

Runner-up

- Linafoot: 2012

== Honours ==
1°de agosto

- Girabola: 2016
