= Mutamba Milambo =

Congolese footballer (born 1984)

Personal information
- Full name: Albert Milambo-Mutamba
- Date of birth: December 1, 1984 (age 41)
- Place of birth: Mbuji-Mayi, Zaire
- Height: 1.80 m (5 ft 11 in)
- Position: Defensive midfielder

Senior career*
Years	Team	Apps	(Gls)
2003–2005	AS Vita Club		
2005–2008	Le Havre	18	(1)
2008–2009	AS Beauvais	30	(4)
2009–2010	Cannes	26	(1)
2010–2013	AS Beauvais	72	(15)
2013–2015	Progresso Sambizanga	19	(2)
2016	1º de Agosto	5	(0)
2017	Académica Lobito	6	(1)

International career
2004–2012	Congo DR	28	(0)
- * Club domestic league appearances and goals

Albert Milambo-Mutamba, known as Mutamba Milambo (born 1 December 1984, in Mbuji-Mayi) is a Congolese former professional footballer who played as a midfielder.

He was a member of the Congolese 2006 African Nations Cup team, who progressed to the quarter finals, where they were eliminated by Egypt, who eventually won the tournament.
