= Gelson Dala =

Angolan footballer (born 1996)

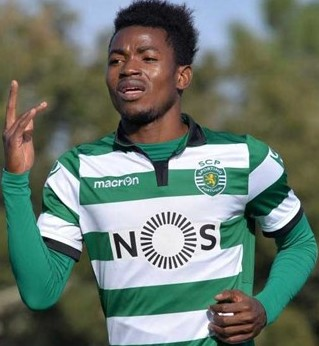
- Gelson with Sporting CP in 2017

Personal information
- Full name: Jacinto Muondo Dala
- Date of birth: 13 July 1996 (age 30)
- Place of birth: Luanda, Angola
- Height: 1.75 m (5 ft 9 in)
- Positions: Attacking midfielder; forward

Youth career
- 2012–2013: 1º de Agosto

Senior career*
Years	Team	Apps	(Gls)
2013–2016	1º de Agosto	72	(46)
2017–2018	Sporting B	23	(17)
2017–2020	Sporting CP	1	(0)
2018–2019	→ Rio Ave (loan)	24	(5)
2019	→ Antalyaspor (loan)	6	(0)
2020	→ Rio Ave (loan)	14	(6)
2020–2021	Rio Ave	31	(3)
2021–2022	→ Al-Wakrah (loan)	17	(11)
2022–2026	Al-Wakrah	62	(28)

International career^{‡}
2015–	Angola	57	(23)
- * Club domestic league appearances and goals as of 17 January 2026 ‡ National team caps and goals as of 29 December 2025

Jacinto Muondo "Gelson" Dala (born 13 July 1996) is an Angolan professional footballer who plays as an attacking midfielder or a forward for the Angola national team.

== Club career ==
Born in Luanda, Gelson began his career with local C.D. Primeiro de Agosto. In July 2015, it was reported that he was being scouted by Portugal's S.L. Benfica. He scored 23 goals in 27 games as his team won the Girabola in 2016, and subsequently he and teammate Ary Papel signed for Sporting Clube de Portugal for undisclosed fees on contracts with €60 million release clauses.

After arriving in Lisbon in January 2017, Gelson made his debut for Sporting B in LigaPro on 15 January, playing the full 90 minutes of a 4–0 loss at Portimonense. Eight days later he scored his first goal, opening a 1–1 home draw with S.C. Covilhã. He totalled 13 goals in 17 games in his first season in the league, including four on 2 April in a 5–1 win over S.C. Olhanense. He was first called up to Jorge Jesus' main squad for the Primeira Liga match at C.D. Feirense on 13 May, remaining unused in a 2–1 loss, but made his top flight debut eight days later in the final match of the season, replacing namesake Gelson Martins at the end of a 4–1 win over G.D. Chaves at the Estádio José Alvalade.

Back in the reserves on 30 September 2017, Gelson scored a hat-trick in a 4–3 home win over C.D. Santa Clara.

== International career ==
Gelson made his international debut for Angola on 13 June 2015 in a 2017 Africa Cup of Nations qualification match against the Central African Republic at the Estádio Nacional da Tundavala, scoring twice in a 4–0 victory. On 4 July, he scored both goals in a win over Swaziland in Luanda to win the tie 4–2 on aggregate in the preliminary round of 2016 African Nations Championship qualification.

On 20 January 2024, in the 2023 Africa Cup of Nations, he scored a brace in their 3–2 win over Mauritania. On 27 January 2024, he scored a first half brace for 10 men Angola in their Round of 16 win over Namibia.

On 3 December 2025, Dala was called up to the Angola squad for the 2025 Africa Cup of Nations.

== Career statistics ==
=== Club ===
Appearances and goals by club, season and competition
Club	Season	League			National cup		League cup		Continental		Total	
Club	Season	Division	Apps	Goals	Apps	Goals	Apps	Goals	Apps	Goals	Apps	Goals
1º de Agosto	2013	Girabola	4	2	—		—		—		4	2
1º de Agosto	2014	Girabola	19	9	2	1	—		—		21	10
1º de Agosto	2015	Girabola	26	8	—		—		—		26	8
1º de Agosto	2016	Girabola	27	23	1	0	—		—		28	23
1º de Agosto	Total		76	42	3	1	0	0	0	0	79	43
Sporting CP B	2016–17	LigaPro	17	13	—		—		—		17	13
Sporting CP B	2017–18	LigaPro	6	4	—		—		—		6	4
Sporting CP B	Total		23	17	0	0	0	0	0	0	23	17
Sporting CP	2016–17	Primeira Liga	1	0	0	0	0	0	0	0	1	0
Sporting CP	2017–18	Primeira Liga	0	0	1	0	0	0	0	0	1	0
Sporting CP	2018–19	Primeira Liga	0	0	0	0	0	0	0	0	0	0
Sporting CP	Total		1	0	1	0	0	0	0	0	2	0
Rio Ave (loan)	2017–18	Primeira Liga	5	0	1	1	0	0	—		6	1
Rio Ave (loan)	2018–19	Primeira Liga	19	5	0	0	3	1	2	1	24	7
Rio Ave (loan)	Total		24	5	1	1	3	1	2	1	30	8
Antalyaspor (loan)	2019–20	Süper Lig	6	0	3	1	—		—		9	1
Rio Ave (loan)	2019–20	Primeira Liga	14	6	0	0	0	0	—		14	6
Rio Ave (loan)	2020–21	Primeira Liga	31	3	3	2	0	0	2	1	36	6
Rio Ave (loan)	Total		45	9	3	2	0	0	2	1	50	12
Al-Wakrah	2021–22	Qatar Stars League	17	11	3	1	9	7	0	0	29	19
Al-Wakrah	2022–23	Qatar Stars League	20	15	1	0	3 (Note: Appearances in FIFA Referees Cup)	1	0	0	24	16
Al-Wakrah	2023–24	Qatar Stars League	21	7	0	0	0	0	1	0	22	7
Al-Wakrah	2024–25	Qatar Stars League	12	4	0	0	0	0	1	0	12	4
Al-Wakrah	2025-26	Qatar Stars League	11	2	1	0	0	0	0	0	12	2
Al-Wakrah	2026-27	Qatar Stars League	3	0	2	1					5	1
Al-Wakrah	Total		77	37	6	2	12	8	1	0	104	46
Career total			258	111	18	7	15	9	5	2	296	129

=== International ===
Scores and results list Angola's goal tally first, score column indicates score after each Dala goal.

List of international goals scored by Gelson Dala
No.	Date	Venue	Opponent	Score	Result	Competition
1	13 June 2015	Estádio Nacional da Tundavala, Lubango, Angola	Central African Republic	1–0	4–0	2017 Africa Cup of Nations qualification
2	13 June 2015	Estádio Nacional da Tundavala, Lubango, Angola	Central African Republic	3–0	4–0	2017 Africa Cup of Nations qualification
3	4 July 2015	Estádio 11 de Novembro, Talatona, Angola	Swaziland	1–0	2–0	2016 African Nations Championship qualification
4	4 July 2015	Estádio 11 de Novembro, Talatona, Angola	Swaziland	2–0	2–0	2016 African Nations Championship qualification
5	24 October 2015	Estádio 11 de Novembro, Talatona, Angola	South Africa	1–1	1–2	2016 African Nations Championship qualification
6	13 November 2015	Estadio Nacional de Ombaka, Benguela, Angola	South Africa	1–0	1–3	2018 FIFA World Cup qualification
7	21 January 2016	Stade Huye, Butare, Rwanda	DR Congo	1–3	2–4	2016 African Nations Championship
8	3 September 2016	Estádio 11 de Novembro, Talatona, Angola	Madagascar	1–1	1–1	2017 Africa Cup of Nations qualification
9	10 June 2017	Stade du 4 Août, Ouagadougou, Burkina Faso	Burkina Faso	1–1	1–3	2019 Africa Cup of Nations qualification
10	9 September 2018	Estádio 11 de Novembro, Talatona, Angola	Botswana	1–0	1–0	2019 Africa Cup of Nations qualification
11	12 October 2018	Estádio 11 de Novembro, Talatona, Angola	Mauritania	4–1	4–1	2019 Africa Cup of Nations qualification
12	13 October 2020	Estádio Municipal de Rio Maior, Rio Maior, Portugal	Mauritania	3–0	3–0	Friendly
13	1 June 2022	Estádio 11 de Novembro, Talatona, Angola	Central African Republic	2–1	2–1	2023 Africa Cup of Nations qualification
14	5 June 2022	Mahamasina Municipal Stadium, Antananarivo, Madagascar	Madagascar	2–1	1–1	2023 Africa Cup of Nations qualification
15	13 October 2023	Estádio Municipal de Albufeira, Albufeira, Portugal	Mozambique	1–1	1–1	Friendly
16	10 January 2024	Police Officers' Club Stadium, Dubai, United Arab Emirates	Bahrain	2–0	3–0	Friendly
17	20 January 2024	Stade de la Paix, Bouaké, Ivory Coast	Mauritania	1–0	3–2	2023 Africa Cup of Nations
18	20 January 2024	Stade de la Paix, Bouaké, Ivory Coast	Mauritania	2–1	3–2	2023 Africa Cup of Nations
19	27 January 2024	Stade de la Paix, Bouaké, Ivory Coast	Namibia	1–0	3–0	2023 Africa Cup of Nations
20	27 January 2024	Stade de la Paix, Bouaké, Ivory Coast	Namibia	2–0	3–0	2023 Africa Cup of Nations
21	25 March 2025	Estádio 11 de Novembro, Talatona, Angola	Cape Verde	1–1	1–2	2026 FIFA World Cup qualification
22	17 December 2025	Estádio centro de treinamento, Almancil, Portugal	Mozambique	1-0	4-1	Friendly match
23	26 December 2025	Marrakesh Stadium, Marrakesh, Morocco	Zimbabwe	1–0	1–1	2025 Africa Cup of Nations

== Honours ==
Angola

- Four Nations Tournament bronze medal: 2018
