= Antonio Dominique =

Swiss-Angolan footballer (born 1994)

Personal information
- Full name: Antonio Signori Nymi Dominique
- Date of birth: 25 July 1994 (age 32)
- Place of birth: Lausanne, Switzerland
- Height: 1.85 m (6 ft 1 in)
- Position: Goalkeeper

Senior career*
Years	Team	Apps	(Gls)
2012–2013	Lausanne-Sport II	9	(0)
2012–2014	Lausanne-Sport	12	(0)
2014–2015	FC Le Mont	8	(0)
2015–2017	Primeiro de Agosto	36	(0)
2017–2019	FC Basel II	8	(0)
2018–2019	FC Basel	1	(0)
2020–2022	Petro de Luanda	13	(0)
2023–2026	Étoile Carouge	82	(0)

International career^{‡}
2014–	Angola	16	(0)
- * Club domestic league appearances and goals as of 26 May 2026 ‡ National team caps and goals as of 16:49, 17 February 2024 (UTC)

Antonio Signori Nymi Dominique (born 25 July 1994) is a professional footballer who plays as a goalkeeper.

Born in Switzerland, António represents Angola at international level.

== Club career ==
Born in Lausanne, Switzerland, Dominique has played club football for Lausanne-Sport II, Lausanne-Sport, FC Le Mont, Primeiro de Agosto, FC Basel II, FC Basel and Petro de Luanda.

In summer 2023, Signori signed a contract with Swiss Promotion League club Étoile Carouge.

== International career ==
He made his international debut for Angola in 2014.

On 3 December 2025, Dominique was called up to the Angola squad for the 2025 Africa Cup of Nations.
