= C.D. Primeiro de Agosto =

Angolan sports club

1º de Agosto
- Full name: Clube Desportivo Primeiro de Agosto
- Nicknames: D'Agosto; Os Rubro e Negros; Os Militares; O Glorioso
- Founded: 1 August 1977; 49 years ago
- Ground: Estádio França Ndalu, Luanda, Angola
- Capacity: 20,000
- President: Gen. Carlos Hendrick
- Manager: Filipe Nzanza
- League: Girabola
- 2025–26: 3rd
- Website: www.1agosto.com
Home colours	Away colours	Third colours

Clube Desportivo 1º de Agosto is a multisports club from Luanda, Angola. The club, founded 1 August 1977, is attached to the Angolan Armed Forces, which is its sponsor. Its main team competes in men's football, and its professional basketball team is also noteworthy within the club. The club's colors are red and black. The club won its first title in football, the Angolan League, in 1979. and in basketball in 1980. Handball and Volleyball have also won many titles to the club.

The Primeiro de Agosto Sports Club has its football team competing at the local level, in the events organized by the Angolan Football Federation, namely the Angolan National Football Championship a.k.a. Girabola, the Angola Cup and the Angola Super Cup as well as at continental level, at the annual competitions organized by the African Football Confederation (CAF), including the CAF Champions League and the CAF Confederation Cup.

== History ==
The founding of 1º de Agosto stemmed from a sports development strategy defined by the People's Armed Forces for the Liberation of Angola (FAPLA) through the National Military Sports Committee (CODENM). It was the first club created in the post-independence period.

The club's predominant colors are red and black, but it also features yellow and blue.

== Achievements ==
- Angolan League: 13
  - 1979, 1980, 1981, 1991, 1992, 1996, 1998, 1999, 2006, 2016, 2017, 2018, 2018–19
- Angola Cup: 6
  - 1984, 1990, 1991, 2006, 2009, 2019

Runner-up: (6) 1992, 1997, 1998, 2004, 2011, 2017

- Angolan SuperCup: 9
  - 1991, 1992, 1997, 1998, 1999, 2000, 2010, 2017, 2019

Runner-up: (2) 1993, 2007

== Recent seasons ==
C.D. Primeiro de Agosto's season-by-season performance since 2011:
As of 22 May 2019

Overall match statistics
Season	Pld	W	D	L	GF	GA	GD	%
2018–19	35	24	10	1	59	14	+45	0.700
2018	42	22	17	3	47	20	+27	0.560
2017	40	24	10	6	60	25	+35	0.675
2016	31	20	6	5	60	23	+37	0.726
2015	30	17	9	4	51	23	+28	0.633
2014	36	19	4	13	61	40	+21	0.708
2013	35	17	7	11	48	31	+17	0.643
2012	31	17	7	7	47	27	+20	0.661
2011	40	15	17	8	55	45	+10	0.475

Classifications
LG	AC	SC	CL	CC
1st	–	–	PR	–
1st	–	–	SF	–
1st	2nd	W	PR	
1st	R16			
2nd	R16			
4th	QF		R32	
2nd	R16		R32	
2nd	R16			
6th	2nd			R16

Top season scorers
Player	LG	AC	SC	CL	T
Mabululu	14	3	–	0	17
Jacques	8			4	12
Geraldo	7	4	1	1	13
Gelson	23	0		–	23
Ary Papel	12	0		–	12
Ary Papel	13	0		1	14
Guilherme Afonso	6	1		–	7
Mingo Bile	12				
Amaro	10	2		2	14

- PR = Preliminary round, 1R = First round, GS = Group stage, R32 = Round of 32, R16 = Round of 16, QF = Quarter-finals, SF = Semi-finals, RU = Runner-Up, W = Winner

== Stadium ==
Primeiro de Agosto is in the process of building its own football stadium. Named after Gen. França Ndalu, the 20,000-seat stadium whose works began in 2012 and are scheduled to be completed in 2019, is part of a sports complex - Cidade Desportiva 1º de Agosto - that includes a youth academy with boarding facilities and two football courts for training purposes, a secondary school, a university, a tennis court, office buildings, an Olympic swimming pool and a 2,500-seat indoor sports arena. The complex and the stadium are located at the Cassequel neighborhood in Luanda.

Starting from the 2020–21 season, the club announced that they will be playing their home games at the França Ndalu.

== Performance in CAF competitions ==

1º Agosto 3-0 FC Platinum

- CAF Champions League: 12 appearances
  - 2019 – Preliminary Round
  - 2018 – Semi-finals
  - 2017 – Preliminary Round
  - 2014 – First Round of 32
  - 2013 – First Round of 32
  - 2011 – 1/16 Finals
  - 2009 – 1/8 Finals
  - 2008 – 1/16 Finals
  - 2007 – Preliminary Round
  - 2000 – Second Round of 16
  - 1999 – First Round of 32
  - 1997 – 3rd Place (group A)
- CAF Confederation Cup: 3 appearances
  - 2011 – Second Round of 16
  - 2010 – Second Round of 16
  - 2009 – Quarter-finals
- CAF Cup: 2 appearances
  - 2003 – First Round
  - 1996 – Second Round
- CAF Cup Winners' Cup: 3 appearances
  - 1998 – Finalist
  - 1991 – First Round
  - 1985 – First Round
- African Cup of Champions Clubs: 5 appearances
  - 1993 – First Round of 32
  - 1992 – Second Round of 16
  - 1982 – First Round of 32
  - 1981 – First Round of 32
  - 1980 – First Round of 32

== Players and staff ==
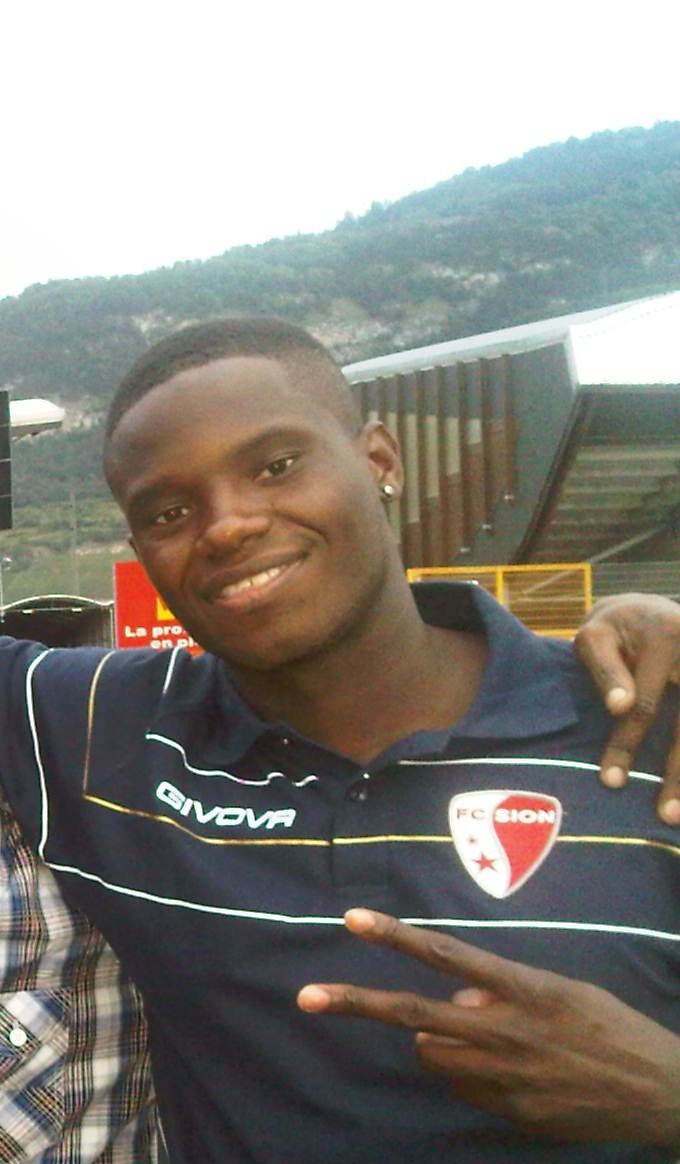
Guilherme Afonso signed with 1º de Agosto in 2013

=== Squad ===
As of 26 January 2024

Note: Flags indicate national team as defined under FIFA eligibility rules; some limited exceptions apply. Players may hold more than one non-FIFA nationality.

No.	Pos.	Nation	Player
3	DF	ANG	Mabele
4	DF	COD	Bobo (captain)
5	DF	ANG	Bonifácio Caetano
6	DF	ANG	Filipe Tchitungo
7	MF	ANG	Mingo Bile
8	MF	COD	Merveille Kikasa
9	FW	ANG	Liliano Pedro
10	MF	ANG	Calebi Yanda
11	FW	COD	Ricky Tulengi
12	GK	ANG	Mig
13	MF	ANG	Aguinaldo Matias
14	FW	COD	Obed Mukokiani
15	DF	ANG	Kukila Venancio
16	MF	ANG	José Macaia

No.	Pos.	Nation	Player
17	FW	COD	Dago Tshibamba
18	FW	ANG	Manu
19	DF	ANG	Paizo
20	FW	ANG	Tombé
21	DF	ANG	Isaac
22	GK	ANG	Neblú
23	FW	ANG	Clíver
24	MF	ANG	Zinedine Catraio
25	MF	ANG	Moisés Amor
27	DF	ANG	Antonio Hossi
28	FW	ANG	Melono
29	MF	ANG	Vingumba
34	MF	ANG	César Cangué

=== Staff ===
Name	Nat	Position(s)
Technical staff
Felipe Nzanza	(Angola)	Head Coach
Filipe Nzanza	(Angola)	Assistant Coach
Napoleão Brandão	(Angola)	Goalkeeper Coach
Medical
Abel Sanz	(Cuba)	Physician
Leonilde Ferreira	(Angola)	Psychotherapist
Jorge Nabais	(Angola)	Fitness Coach
Feliciano Madalena	(Angola)	Physio
Andrade Mendes	(Angola)	Physio
Management
Gen. Carlos Hendrick	(Angola)	Chairman
Paulo Magueijo	(Angola)	Vice-chairman
José Marcelino	(Angola)	Head of Foot Dept
Carlos Alves	(Angola)	Spokesman

== Manager history ==
Season	Coach	S	L	C	Coach	S	L	C
1979	(Angola) Nicola Berardinelli †		1979 Girabola					
1980 †	(Angola) Ferreira Pinto				(Socialist Federal Republic of Yugoslavia) Ivan Ridanović		1980 Girabola	
1981	(Socialist Federal Republic of Yugoslavia) Ivan Ridanović				(Angola) Joaquim Dinis		1981 Girabola	
1982	(Angola) Joaquim Dinis				(Argentina) Mário Imbelloni			
1983	(Argentina) Mário Imbelloni				(Angola) Nicola Berardinelli			
1984	(Angola) Carlos Alves				(Socialist Federal Republic of Yugoslavia) Petar Kzernević			1984 Angola Cup
1985	(Angola) Nicola Berardinelli				(Brazil) Paulo Roberto			
1986	(Brazil) Paulo Roberto				(Angola) Carlos Alves			
1987	(Angola) João Machado							
1988	(Angola) Joca Santinho				(Angola) João Machado			
1989	(Angola) João Machado				(Angola) Carlos Alves			
1990	(Serbia) Dušan Condić			1990 Angola Cup				
1991	(Serbia) Dušan Condić	1991 Angola SuperCup	1991 Girabola	1991 Angola Cup				
1992	(Serbia) Dušan Condić	1992 Angola SuperCup	1992 Girabola					
1993	(Serbia) Dušan Condić				(Angola) Carlos Alves			
1994	(Brazil) Djalma Cavalcante							
1995	(Brazil) Djalma Cavalcante							
1996	(Angola) Mário Calado		1996 Girabola					
1997	(Serbia) Dušan Condić				(Angola) Mário Calado			
1998	(Angola) Ndunguidi Daniel	1998 Angola SuperCup	1998 Girabola					
1999	(Angola) Ndunguidi Daniel	1999 Angola SuperCup	1999 Girabola					
2000	(Angola) Ndunguidi Daniel	2000 Angola SuperCup			(Angola) Mário Calado			
2001	(Brazil) Waldemar Cerdeira							
2002	(Brazil) Waldemar Cerdeira				(Angola) Jaime Chimalanga			

Season	Coach	S	L	C	Coach	S	L	C	Coach	S	L	C
2003	(Angola) Jaime Chimalanga				(Serbia) Dušan Condić							
2004	(Serbia) Dušan Condić				(Angola) Ndunguidi Daniel				(Netherlands) Jan Brouwer			
2005	(Netherlands) Jan Brouwer											
2006	(Netherlands) Jan Brouwer		2006 Girabola	2006 Angola Cup								
2007	(Netherlands) Jan Brouwer	2007 Angola SuperCup			(Portugal) Vítor Manuel							
2008	(Portugal) Vítor Manuel											
2009	(Russia) Viktor Bondarenko				(Angola) Humberto Chaves			2009 Angola Cup				
2010	(Serbia) Ljubinko Drulović	2010 Angola SuperCup										
2011	(Serbia) Ljubinko Drulović				(Portugal) Carlos Manuel				(Angola) Romeu Filemón			
2012	(Angola) Romeu Filemón											
2013	(Angola) Romeu Filemón				(Mozambique) Daúto Faquirá							
2014	(Mozambique) Daúto Faquirá				(Bosnia and Herzegovina) Dragan Jović							
2015	(Bosnia and Herzegovina) Dragan Jović											
2016	(Bosnia and Herzegovina) Dragan Jović		2016 Girabola									
2017 *	(Bosnia and Herzegovina) Dragan Jović	2017 Angola SuperCup	2017 Girabola									
2018	(Serbia) Zoran Manojlović		2018 Girabola									
2018-19	(Bosnia and Herzegovina) Dragan Jović		2018–19 Girabola	2019 Angola Cup								
2019-20	(Bosnia and Herzegovina) Dragan Jović	2019 Angola SuperCup										
2020-21	(Portugal) Paulo Duarte				(Angola) Filipe Nzanza							
2021-22	(Serbia) Srđan Vasiljević											
2022–23	(Angola) Filipe Nzanza											
2023–24	(Angola) Filipe Nzanza											

* Ivo Traça won the 2017 Super Cup as a caretaker manager

== Chairman history ==
Santana André Pitra Petroff	1977	–	1979
Pedro de Castro Van-Dúnem Loy	1979	–	1982
Iko Carreira	1982	–	1988
Justino Fernandes	1988	–	1993
Mello Xavier	1993	–	1997
Gen. Pedro Neto *	1997	–	Dec 2006
Gen. Raúl Hendrick	Dec 2006	–	Aug 2011
Gen. Carlos Hendrick *	Aug 2011	–	present

* Served two consecutive terms

== Sponsors ==
- Banco de Fomento Angola (BFA)
- Banco Português do Atlântico (BPA)

== See also ==
- Primeiro de Agosto Basketball
- Primeiro de Agosto Handball
- Primeiro de Agosto Volleyball
- Primeiro de Agosto Hockey
- Girabola
- Gira Angola

== Trivia ==
On 4 April 1981, before a capacity crowd of 70,000 in Kaduna, Primeiro de Agosto played against then CAN title holders The Green Eagles. In that match that ended in a scoreless draw, D'Agosto put up such a superb performance that the Nigerian supporters and media mistook the club for the Angola national team.
