= 2019–20 C.D. Primeiro de Agosto season =

Clube Desportivo Primeiro de Agosto
2019–20 season
- President: Gen. Carlos Hendrick
- Manager: Dragan Jović (Nov 2018–May 2019)
- Stadium: Estádio 11 de Novembro
- Angola Super Cup: Winner
- Top goalscorer: League: Mabululu (12); All: Mabululu (19)
- Biggest win: D'Agosto 4–0 Rec Caála (20 Oct 2019)
- Biggest defeat: D'Agosto 0–2 Petro (03 Nov 2019); Zamalek 2–0 D'Agosto (07 Dec 2019)
Home colours	Away colours	Third colours
- All statistics correct as of 19 March 2020.

The 2019–20 season of Clube Desportivo Primeiro de Agosto was the club's 42nd season in the Girabola, the Angolan Premier football League and 42nd consecutive season in the top flight of Angolan football. The club participated in the Super Cup, Girabola, the Angola Cup and the 2019–20 CAF Champions League.

On April 30, 2020, in a meeting with the representatives of the 2019–20 season girabola clubs, the Angolan Football Federation decided to cancel the 2019-20 Girabola season due to the coronavirus pandemic.

== Squad information ==
=== First team ===
As of August 2019

Squad No.	Name	Nationality	Position(s)	Place of birth	Date of birth (Age)	Previous club
Goalkeepers
1	Justo Pucusso Julião	(Angola)	GK	Luanda, Angola	15 July 1992 (aged 28)	(Angola) Recreativo da Caála
12	Adão Cabaça Tony	(Angola)	GK	Luanda, Angola	23 April 1986 (aged 34)	(Angola) Junior team
22	Adilson Cruz Neblú	(Angola)	GK	Luanda, Angola	16 December 1993 (aged 27)	(Angola) Interclube
Defenders
3	Natael Masuekama	(Angola)	LB	Kinshasa, D.R. Congo	23 September 1993 (aged 27)	(Angola) Recreativo do Libolo
4	Bodrick Muselenge Bobo	(Democratic Republic of the Congo)	CB	Kasa-Vubu, D.R. Congo	19 November 1989 (aged 31)	(Angola) Kabuscorp
5	Massunguna Afonso Dani	(Angola)	CB	Benguela, Angola	1 May 1986 (aged 34)	(Angola) Primeiro de Maio
6	Bonifácio Caetano	(Angola)	CB	Luanda, Angola	9 August 1993 (aged 27)	(Angola) Desportivo da Huíla
15	Mariano Vidal Jó	(Angola)	CB	Angola	20 February 1995 (aged 25)	(Angola) Progresso Sambizanga
19	Salomão Troco Paizo	(Angola)	LB	Luanda, Angola	10 May 1992 (aged 28)	(Angola) Norberto de Castro
21	Isaac Costa	(Angola)	RB	Luanda, Angola	25 April 1991 (aged 29)	(Angola) Petro de Luanda
Midfielders
7	Cirilo Silva	(Angola)	RW	Angola	2 March 1998 (aged 22)	(Angola) Junior team
8	Mário Balbúrdia	(Angola)	CM	Luanda, Angola	19 August 1997 (aged 23)	(Angola) Junior team
9	Luvumbo Pedro Buá	(Angola)	CM/DM	Luanda, Angola	6 September 1988 (aged 32)	(Angola) Petro de Luanda
10	Ibukun Akinfenwa	(Nigeria) (Belgium)	CM	Lagos, Nigeria	22 October 1990 (aged 30)	(Portugal) S.C. Farense
13	Kipe Bokamba Mongo	(Democratic Republic of the Congo)	LW	D.R. Congo	22 August 1993 (aged 27)	(Angola) Kabuscorp
14	Nelson da Luz	(Angola)	RW	Luanda, Angola	4 February 1998 (aged 22)	(Angola) Junior team
16	José Macaia	(Angola)	DM	Cabinda, Angola	24 March 1994 (aged 26)	(Angola) Benfica de Luanda
18	Yazid Atouba	(Cameroon)	AM	Yaoundé, Cameroon	2 January 1993 (aged 27)	(South Africa) Maritzburg United
20	Emmanuel Ngudikama Kila	(Democratic Republic of the Congo)	LW	Kinshasa, D.R. Congo	7 April 1987 (aged 33)	(Democratic Republic of the Congo) AS Vita Club
24	Zinedine Catraio	(Angola)	AM	Luanda, Angola	17 June 1998 (aged 22)	(Angola) Junior team
30	Manuel Afonso Ary Papel	(Angola)	LW	Luanda, Angola	6 May 1994 (aged 26)	Sporting de Portugal
33	Fernando Mateus Duarte	(Angola)	LW		28 February 2000 (aged 20)	(Angola) Junior team
34	Etson Congo Zalata Manelé	(Angola)	LW			(Angola) Junior team
Forwards
11	Zito Luvumbo	(Angola)	FW/RW	Luanda, Angola	9 March 2002 (aged 18)	(Angola) Junior team
26	Agostinho Paciência Mabululu	(Angola)	ST	Luanda, Angola	1 June 1992 (aged 28)	(Angola) Domant FC
27	Lionel Yombi	(Cameroon)	ST	Cameroon	5 February 1994 (aged 26)	(Angola) Desportivo da Huíla

=== Out on loan ===
As of August 2019

Name	Nationality	Position(s)	Date of birth (Age)	To Club	Notes
João Muanha Gogoró	(Angola)	RW	6 June 1995 (aged 25)	(Angola) Progresso Sambizanga	
Nelson Miango Mudile Mona	(Angola)	DF	26 July 1997 (aged 23)	(Angola) Recreativo da Caála	
Nsesani Simão	(Angola)	GK	5 November 2000 (aged 20)	(Angola) Académica do Lobito	
Régio Zalata Mingo Bile	(Angola)	RW	15 June 1987 (aged 33)	(Angola) Desportivo da Huíla	

=== Staff ===
Nat	Name	Position(s)	Date of birth (age)
Technical staff
(Bosnia and Herzegovina)	Dragan Jović	Head coach	19 June 1963 (aged 57)
(Angola)	Filipe Nzanza	Assistant Coach	19 May 1969 (aged 51)
(Angola)	Ivo Traça	Assistant Coach	19 May 1961 (aged 59)
(Angola)	Napoleão Brandão	Goalkeeper Coach	13 June 1952 (aged 68)
Medical
(Cuba)	Abel Sanz	Physician	–
(Angola)	Leonilde Ferreira	Psychotherapist	–
(Angola)	Jorge Nabais	Fitness Coach	–
(Angola)	Feliciano Madalena	Physio	–
(Angola)	Andrade Mendes	Physio	–
Management
(Angola)	Gen. Carlos Hendrick	Chairman	–
(Angola)	Paulo Magueijo	Vice-Chairman	–
(Angola)	José Marcelino	Head of Foot Dept	–
(Angola)	Carlos Alves	Spokesman	–

=== Pre-season transfers ===
No.	Nat	Nick	Name	Pos	Date of Birth (Age)	
Transfers out To
7	(Angola)	Mingo Bile	Régio Francisco Congo Zalata	RW	15 June 1987 (aged 33)	Desportivo da Huíla
15	(Nigeria)	Yisa	Kehinde Yisa Anifowoshe	CB	11 October 1992 (aged 28)	
17	(Democratic Republic of the Congo)	Dago	Tshibamba Samu	FW	3 September 1997 (aged 23)	Olympique de Khouribga
18	(Brazil)	Aquino	Anderson Angus Aquino	MF	18 December 1986 (aged 34)	
23	(Angola)	Show	Manuel Luís da Silva Cafumana	MF	6 March 1999 (aged 21)	Lille
Transfers in From
15	(Angola)	Jó	Mariano da Costa vidal	DF	20 February 1995 (aged 25)	Progresso Sambizanga
18	(Cameroon)	Atouba	Yazid Atouba	MF	2 January 1993 (aged 27)	Maritzburg United
27	(Cameroon)	Lionel	Lionel Vera Yombi	FW	5 February 1994 (aged 26)	Desportivo da Huíla

=== Mid-season transfers ===
No.	Nat	Nick	Name	Pos	Date of Birth (Age)
Transfers out To
Transfers in From

== Overview ==
Competition	First match	Last match	Final position	Record							
Competition	First match	Last match	Final position	Pld	W	D	L	GF	GA	GD	Win %
Girabola	20 August 2019	14 March 2020	cancelled	23	16	3	4	42	13	+29	69.57
Angola Cup	29 January 2010	18 March 2020		4	3	1	0	4	1	+3	75.00
Angola Super Cup	2 August 2019	5 August 2019	Winners	2	1	0	1	2	1	+1	50.00
CAF Champions League	10 August 2019	1 February 2020	Group stage	10	3	4	3	10	9	+1	30.00
Total				39	23	8	8	58	24	+34	58.97

Last updated: 18 March 2020

== Angola Super Cup ==
=== First leg ===
Fri, 2 August 2019
15:30

Desportivo da Huíla	1–0	Primeiro de Agosto
Manico 45+1'	Report

Estádio do Ferrovia, Lubango
Referee: João Goma

Desportivo	D'Agosto

GK	22	(Angola)	Benvindo
RB	8	(Brazil)	Sidney
CB	5	(Ghana)	Seth
CB	13	(Angola)	Chiwe (c)	(yellow card) 78'
LB	27	(Angola)	Bruno
RM	21	(Angola)	Yuri		(substituted off) 90+1'
CM	15	(Angola)	Elias	(yellow card) 27'
CM	28	(Angola)	Nuno
LM	14	(Angola)	Manico		(substituted off) 80'
FW	11	(Angola)	Nandinho		(substituted off) 51'
FW	21	(Angola)	Tchutchu		(substituted off) 75'
Substitutions:
MF	18	(Angola)	Milton		(substituted on) 51'
MF	3	(Angola)	Malamba		(substituted on) 75'
FW	25	(Angola)	Pedro		(substituted on) 90+1'
–
Manager:
(Angola) Mário Soares

GK	12	(Angola)	Tony	(yellow card) 41'
RB	21	(Angola)	Isaac
CB	4	(Democratic Republic of the Congo)	Bobo
CB	5	(Angola)	Dani (c)
LB	19	(Angola)	Paizo		(substituted off) 71'
RM	30	(Angola)	Ary Papel	Yellow card
CM	10	(Nigeria)	Ibukun
CM	16	(Angola)	Macaia		(substituted off) 52'
LM	14	(Angola)	Nelson
FW	11	(Angola)	Zito		(substituted off) 72'
FW	27	(Cameroon)	Lionel
Substitutions:
MF	20	(Democratic Republic of the Congo)	Kila		(substituted on) 72'
DF	3	(Angola)	Natael		(substituted on) 71'
MF	18	(Cameroon)	Atouba	(yellow card) 85'	(substituted on) 52'
–
Manager:
(Bosnia and Herzegovina) Dragan Jović

Assistant referees:
José Felix
Dário Gaspar

Fourth official:
Edson Essoko

Commissioner:
João Gonçalves

=== Second leg ===
Mon, 5 August 2019
18:50

Primeiro de Agosto	2–0	Desportivo da Huíla
Ary Papel 40' (pen.); Lionel 85'	Report

Estádio 11 de Novembro, Luanda
Referee: António Cachala

D'Agosto	Desportivo

GK	12	(Angola)	Tony
RB	21	(Angola)	Isaac
CB	4	(Democratic Republic of the Congo)	Bobo
CB	5	(Angola)	Dani (c)
LB	3	(Angola)	Natael
RM	30	(Angola)	Ary Papel	(yellow card) 40'
CM	10	(Nigeria)	Ibukun	(yellow card) 84'
CM	16	(Angola)	Macaia
LM	20	(Democratic Republic of the Congo)	Kila		(substituted off) 73'
FW	11	(Angola)	Zito		(substituted off) 90'
FW	26	(Angola)	Mabululu		(substituted off) 78'
Substitutions:
MF	9	(Angola)	Buá		(substituted on) 73'
FW	27	(Cameroon)	Lionel		(substituted on) 78'
MF	13	(Democratic Republic of the Congo)	Mongo		(substituted on) 90'
–
Manager:
(Bosnia and Herzegovina) Dragan Jović

GK	22	(Angola)	Benvindo	(yellow card) 24'
RB	8	(Brazil)	Sidney
CB	5	(Ghana)	Seth	(yellow card) 39'
CB	13	(Angola)	Chiwe (c)
LB	27	(Angola)	Bruno
RM	18	(Angola)	Milton
CM	15	(Angola)	Elias
CM	28	(Angola)	Nuno		(substituted off) 88'
LM	3	(Angola)	Malamba		(substituted off) 78'
FW	14	(Angola)	Manico
FW	16	(Angola)	Yuri		(substituted off) 46'
Substitutions:
MF	25	(Angola)	Pedro		(substituted on) 46'
MF	21	(Angola)	Tchutchu		(substituted on) 78'
FW	11	(Angola)	Nandinho		(substituted on) 88'
–
Manager:
(Angola) Mário Soares

Assistant referees:
Ivanildo Lopes
António Sylia

Fourth official:

Commissioner:

== Angolan League ==
=== League table ===
Pos	Team	Pld	W	D	L	GF	GA	GD	Pts	Qualification or relegation
1	Petro de Luanda	24	16	6	2	41	10	+31	54	Qualification for Champions League
2	Primeiro de Agosto	23	16	3	4	42	13	+29	51	Qualification for Champions League
3	Bravos do Maquis	23	12	4	7	26	22	+4	40	Qualification for Confederation Cup
4	Desportivo da Huíla	22	10	7	5	24	16	+8	37	
5	Sagrada Esperança	23	9	7	7	21	16	+5	34	

Updated to match(es) played on 22 March 2020. Source: Girabola.com Girabola
Rules for classification: 1) Points; 2) Head-to-head points; 3) Goal difference; 4) Head-to-head goal difference; 5) Goals scored; 6) Fair-play points; 7) Play-off.

=== Match details ===
Tue, 20 Aug 2019 02	1º de Agosto	2–0	Desportivo Huíla	11 de Novembro, Luanda
16:00 WAT (UTC+1)	Zito 26'; Lionel 35' (pen.)	Report		Referee: Paulo Sérgio; Assts: Lídio Coimbra, Segunda Tchisseque
Note: Tony / Bobo, Dani (c), Isaac, Paizo / Ary Papel (substituted off) 39', Ibukun (substituted off) 29', Macaia, Nelson / Lionel (substituted off) 79', Zito — Catraio (substituted on) 29', Kila (substituted on) 39', Mabululu (substituted on) 79'

Tue, 27 Aug 2019 01	Progresso	1–0	1º de Agosto	Coqueiros, Luanda
17:30 WAT (UTC+1)	Moco 5'			Referee: Carlos Armando; Assts: Manuel Lobe, Alberto Dumbi
Note: Tony / Bobo, Dani (c), Isaac, Natael (substituted off) 47' / Catraio (substituted off) 46', Kila, Macaia, Zito / Lionel (substituted off) 48', Mabululu — Mário (substituted on) 46', Paizo (substituted on) 47', Atouba (substituted on) 48'

Sat, 31 Aug 2019 03	Sagrada	0–1	1º de Agosto	Sagrada Esperança, Dundo
15:00 WAT (UTC+1)		Report	63' (pen.) Mabululu	Referee: Benjamin Andrade; Bernabé Ngulo, Ricardo Daniel
Note: Tony / Bobo, Dani (c), Isaac, Paizo / Atouba (substituted off) 84', Kila (substituted off) 82', Macaia, Mário / Mabululu, Zito (substituted off) 90+2' — Lionel (substituted on) 82', Catraio (substituted on) 84', Melono (substituted on) 90+2'

Thu, 19 Sep 2019 04	1º de Agosto	2–0	Ferrovia Huambo	11 de Novembro, Luanda
16:00 WAT (UTC+1)	Ary Papel 44' (pen.); Mabululu 57'	Report		Referee: Bernardo Moreira; Ailton Carmelino, Cláudio Francisco
Note: Neblú / Dani (c), Isaac, Jó, Paizo / Ary Papel, Ibukun (substituted off) 85', Kila (substituted off) 67', Macaia / Mabululu (substituted off) 76', Zito — Nelson (substituted on) 67', Atouba (substituted on) 76', Buá (substituted on) 85'

Sun, 22 Sep 2019 05	S^{ta} Rita de Cássia	1–4	1º de Agosto	4 de Janeiro, Uíge
15:00 WAT (UTC+1)	Vidinho 38'	Report	4' Buá; 53' Kila; 77' Lionel; 88' Zito	Referee: Rafael Dala; Nelson Kiala, Pedro Micolo
Note: Neblú / Bonifácio, Dani (c), Isaac (substituted off) 61', Paizo / Ary Papel, Buá, Kila (substituted off) 69', Macaia / Lionel (substituted off) 80', Zito — Jó (substituted on) 61', Nelson (substituted on) 69', Mabululu (substituted on) 80'

Sun, 06 Oct 2019 07	Cuando Cubango	0–1	1º de Agosto	Eucaliptos, Kuito
15:00 WAT (UTC+1)		Report	80' Melono	Referee: João Mavungo; Evaristo Baco, João Bundo
Note: Tony / Bobo, Dani (c), Isaac, Natael / Ary Papel, Ibukun (substituted off) 46', Kila (substituted off) 39', Macaia / Mabululu, Zito — Nelson (substituted on) 39', Buá (substituted on) 46', Melono (substituted on) 78'

Sun, 13 Oct 2019 08	1º de Agosto	1–0	Interclube	11 de Novembro, Luanda
16:00 WAT (UTC+1)	Mabululu 41' (pen.)	Report		Referee: António Dungula; Tito Pena, Bernabé Ngulo
Note: Tony / Bobo, Dani (c), Isaac, Paizo / Buá, Ibukun, Macaia, Mongo (substituted off) 81' / Mabululu (substituted off) 87', Nelson (substituted off) 67' — Melono (substituted on) 67', Cirilo (substituted on) 81', Lionel (substituted on) 87'

Sun, 20 Oct 2019 06	1º de Agosto	4–0	Rec da Caála	11 de Novembro, Luanda
17:00 WAT (UTC+1)	Nelson 71', 84'; Paizo 73'; Melono 86'	Report		Referee: Hélder Martins; Júlio Lemos, Joaquim da Rocha
Note: Tony / Bobo, Dani (c), Isaac, Paizo / Buá (substituted off) 83', Ibukun, Macaia, Mongo (substituted off) 69' / Mabululu (substituted off) 81', Nelson — Melono (substituted on) 69', Lionel (substituted on) 81', Mário (substituted on) 83'

Wed, 23 Oct 2019 09	Bravos do Maquis	1–3	1º de Agosto	Mundunduleno, Luena
15:00 WAT (UTC+1)	Mussumari 63'	Report	11' Lionel; 45' Mongo; 77' Mabululu	Referee: Bernardo Moreira; Luís Mateus, Aldair Carmelino
Note: Tony / Bobo, Bonifácio (substituted off) 71', Dani (c), Paizo / Buá, Ibukun, Macaia, Mongo (substituted off) 84' / Lionel (substituted off) 66', Nelson — Mabululu (substituted on) 66', Natael (substituted on) 71', Melono (substituted on) 84'

Sun, 27 Oct 2019 10	1º de Agosto	Annulled (originally 3–1)	1º de Maio	11 de Novembro, Luanda
17:30 WAT (UTC+1)	Ary Papel 57' (pen.); Mabululu 72' (pen.); Natael 79'	Report	30' (pen.) Miguel	Referee: Donaciano Mulumba; Alzandro Capola, Ilídio Baptista
Note: Tony / Bobo, Dani (c), Isaac, Natael / Buá (substituted off) 75', Ibukun, Macaia, Mongo (substituted off) 47' / Lionel (substituted off) 46', Nelson — Mabululu (substituted on) 46', Ary Papel (substituted on) 47', Kila (substituted on) 75'

Sun, 03 Nov 2019 11	1º de Agosto	0–2	Petro Atlético	11 de Novembro, Luanda
16:00 WAT (UTC+1)		Report	42' Dany; 80' Mensah	Referee: Hélder Martins; Jerson Emiliano, Ivanildo Lopes
Note: Tony / Bobo, Dani (c), Isaac, Paizo (substituted off) 82' / Buá, Ibukun, Macaia, Mongo (substituted off) 64' / Ary Papel, Mabululu (substituted off) 63' — Lionel (substituted on) 63', Kila (substituted on) 64', Natael (substituted on) 82'

Sun, 23 Nov 2019 12	Rec do Libolo	1–4	1º de Agosto	Estádio Municipal, Calulo
15:00 WAT (UTC+1)	Leandro 36'		16' Ary Papel; 24', 39' Mabululu; 27' Atouba	Referee: António Dungula; Manuel Benguela, Nilton Armando
Note: Tony / Bobo, Dani (c), Isaac, Paizo / Atouba (substituted off) 70', Kila (substituted off) 69', Ibukun, Macaia / Ary Papel, Mabululu (substituted off) 86' — Mongo (substituted on) 69', Buá (substituted on) 70', Natael (substituted on) 86'

Sun, 15 Dec 2019 13	1º de Agosto	3–0	Académica	11 de Novembro, Luanda
16:00 WAT (UTC+1)	Ary Papel 5', 64', 73'	Report		Referee: Feliciano Lucas; Horácio Tchissingue, Alexandre Bengue
Note: Neblú / Bobo, Dani (c), Isaac, Natael / Ary Papel, Atouba, Buá (substituted off) 77', Mário / Lionel (substituted off) 61', Zito (substituted off) 61' — Mabululu (substituted on) 61', Nelson (substituted on) 61', Catraio (substituted on) 77'

Wed, 18 Dec 2019 14	Sporting Cabinda	1–1	1º de Agosto	Tafe, Cabinda
15:22 WAT (UTC+1)	Foguinho 22'		68' Mabululu
Note: Neblú / Bobo, Dani (c), Natael, Paizo / Atouba, Ibukun (substituted off) 45', Mário, Nelson (substituted off) 45' / Kila, Mabululu — Buá (substituted on) 45', Zito (substituted on) 45' (substituted off) 62', Lionel (substituted on) 62'

Sun, 22 Dec 2019 15	1º de Agosto	2–0	Wiliete SC	11 de Novembro, Luanda
17:00 WAT (UTC+1)	Mabululu 40'; Ary Papel 50'			Referee: Tânia Duarte; Luísa Luhaco, Andália Jeremias
Note: Neblú / Bobo, Dani (c), Isaac, Natael / Ary Papel (substituted off) 65', Atouba (substituted off) 26', Kila, Mário / Mabululu (substituted off) 80', Mongo — Nelson (substituted on) 26', Ibukun (substituted on) 65', Melono (substituted on) 80'

Sun, 19 Jan 2020 16	1º de Agosto	4–0	Progresso	11 de Novembro, Luanda
17:00 WAT (UTC+1)	Bobo 13'; Mabululu 22'; Ary Papel 45'; Lionel 67'			Referee: Paulo Talaia; Ricardo Daniel, Joaquim Chiyo
Note: Neblú / Bobo, Dani (c), Natael, Paizo / Buá, Ibukun (substituted off) 75', Mário, Nelson (substituted off) 69' / Ary Papel, Mabululu (substituted off) 57' — Lionel (substituted on) 57', Zito (substituted on) 69', Aldair (substituted on) 75'

Sat, 08 Feb 2020 19	Ferrovia Huambo	1–1	1º de Agosto	Estádio do Ferrovia, Huambo
15:00 WAT (UTC+1)	Betinho 38'	Report	26' Mabululu	Referee: José Álvaro; Estanislau Guedes, Rosário Calembela
Note: Neblú / Bobo, Dani (c), Isaac, Natael / Ibukun (substituted off) 45', Macaia, Mário, Mongo (substituted off) 78' / Kila, Mabululu — Lionel (substituted on) 45', Fernando (substituted on) 78', Paizo (substituted on) 85'

Wed, 12 Feb 2020 17	Desportivo Huíla	0–1	1º de Agosto	Estádio do Ferrovia, Lubango
15:30 WAT (UTC+1)		Report	80' Ary Papel	Referee: Sabino de Carvalho; Adão da Silva, Evandro Rocha
Note: Neblú / Bobo, Dani (c), Isaac, Natael / Buá (substituted off) 82', Macaia, Mário (substituted off) 45', Mongo / Ary Papel (substituted off) 88', Mabululu — Ibukun (substituted on) 45', Paizo (substituted on) 82', Bonifácio (substituted on) 88'

Sun, 16 Feb 2020 20	1º de Agosto	0–0	S^{ta} Rita de Cássia	11 de Novembro, Luanda
17:00 WAT (UTC+1)		Report		Referee: Nelson Milagre; Miguel Coelho, Hélder Milagre
Note: Neblú / Dani (c), Isaac, Jó, Paizo (substituted off) 45' / Buá, Ibukun, Macaia, Mongo (substituted off) 66' / Mabululu, Zito (substituted off) 71' — Natael (substituted on) 45', Lionel (substituted on) 66', Atouba (substituted on) 71'

Sun, 23 Feb 2020 21	Rec da Caála	1–0	1º de Agosto	Mártires da Canhala, Caála
15:00 WAT (UTC+1)	Deco 77'			Referee: Yuri de Melo; Adão Silva, Evandro Rocha
Note: Neblú / Bonifácio, Dani (c), Natael, Paizo / Buá (substituted off) 64', Macaia, Mário (substituted off) 75', Mongo (substituted off) 45' / Ary Papel, Mabululu — Zito (substituted on) 45', Atouba (substituted on) 64', Ibukun (substituted on) 75'

Wed, 26 Feb 2020 18	1º de Agosto	1–2	Sagrada	11 de Novembro, Luanda
17:00 WAT (UTC+1)	Mabululu 71'	Report	(yellow card) 35' (yellow-red card) 58' L.Tati; 36' Cachi; 83' Gaspar	Referee: Paulo Sérgio; Segunda Tchisseque, Ilídio Coimbra
Note: Neblú / Bonifácio, Dani (c), Isaac (substituted off) 64', Natael / Atouba, Buá (substituted off) 45', Macaia, Mário / Ary Papel (substituted off) 72', Mabululu — Zito (substituted on) 45', Lionel (substituted on) 64', Nelson (substituted on) 72'

Sun, 01 Mar 2020 22	1º de Agosto	2–1	Cuando Cubango	11 de Novembro, Luanda
17:00 WAT (UTC+1)	Massadila 16' (o.g.); Mabululu 56'		78' Cuca	Referee: Carlos Armando; Manuel Lobe, Alberto Dumbi
Note: Neblú / Bobo, Dani (c), Isaac, Paizo / Atouba (substituted off) 77', Buá (substituted off) 63', Kila (substituted off) 60', Mário / Mabululu, Zito — Nelson (substituted on) 60', Macaia (substituted on) 63', Mongo (substituted on) 77'

Sun, 08 Mar 2020 23	Interclube	0–2	1º de Agosto	22 de Junho, Luanda
15:30 WAT (UTC+1)		Report	9' Atouba; 20' Zito	Referee: António Dungula; Júlio Lemos, Judith Mestre
Note: Tony / Bonifácio, Dani (c), Isaac, Paizo / Atouba (substituted off) 79', Buá, Macaia, Mongo (substituted off) 45' / Mabululu, Zito (substituted off) 73' — Ary Papel (substituted on) 45', Kila (substituted on) 73', Jó (substituted on) 79'

Sat, 14 Mar 2020 24	1º de Agosto	3–1	Bravos do Maquis	11 de Novembro, Luanda
17:00 WAT (UTC+1)	Zito 10', 64'; Ary Papel 83'	Report	15' Wiwí	Referee: João Goma; Evanildo Lopes, José Felix
Note: Tony / Bobo, Bonifácio (substituted off) 71', Dani (c), Paizo (substituted off) 60' / Ary Papel, Atouba (substituted off) 45', Macaia, Mário / Mabululu, Zito — Buá (substituted on) 45', Nelson (substituted on) 60', Natael (substituted on) 71'

Sun, 22 Mar 2020 25	1º de Maio	Cancelled	1º de Agosto	Coqueiros, Luanda
15:00 WAT (UTC+1)

Sat, 04 Apr 2020 26	Petro Atlético	Cancelled	1º de Agosto	11 de Novembro, Luanda
16:00 WAT (UTC+1)

Sat, 11 Apr 2020 27	1º de Agosto	Cancelled	Rec do Libolo	11 de Novembro, Luanda
17:00 WAT (UTC+1)

Sun, 19 Apr 2020 28	Académica	Cancelled	1º de Agosto	Ombaka, Benguela
15:00 WAT (UTC+1)

Sat, 25 Apr 2020 29	1º de Agosto	Cancelled	Sporting Cabinda	11 de Novembro, Luanda
16:00 WAT (UTC+1)

Sun, 03 May 2020 30	Wiliete SC	Cancelled	1º de Agosto	Ombaka, Benguela
16:00 WAT (UTC+1)

=== Results ===
==== Results by round ====
Round	1	2	3	4	5	6	7	8	9	10	11	12	13	14	15	16	17	18	19	20	21	22	23	24	25	26	27	28	29	30
Ground	A	H	A	H	A	H	A	H	A	H	H	A	H	A	H	H	A	H	A	H	A	H	A	H	A	A	H	A	H	A
Result	L	W	W	W	W	W	W	W	W		L	W	W	D	W	W	W	L	D	D	L	W	W	W						
Position	10	6	4	4	1	1	1	1	1		1	1	1	2	2	1	1	1	1	1	2	2	2	1						

Updated to match(es) played on 14 March 2020. Source: girabolazap.co.ao
A = Away; H = Home; W = Win; D = Draw; L = Loss

==== Results summary ====
Overall								Home						Away					
Pld	W	D	L	GF	GA	GD	Pts	W	D	L	GF	GA	GD	W	D	L	GF	GA	GD
23	16	3	4	42	13	+29	51	9	1	2	24	6	+18	7	2	2	18	7	+11

Last updated: 14 March 2020.

== CAF Champions League ==
=== Group stage ===
Pos	Team	Pld	W	D	L	GF	GA	GD	Pts	Qualification
1	(Democratic Republic of the Congo) TP Mazembe	6	4	2	0	11	4	+7	14	Advance to knockout stage
2	(Egypt) Zamalek	6	2	3	1	5	4	+1	9	Advance to knockout stage
3	(Angola) 1º de Agosto	6	0	4	2	4	7	−3	4	
4	(Zambia) ZESCO United	6	0	3	3	5	10	−5	3	

Source: CAF
Rules for classification: Tiebreakers

Sat, 01 Feb 2019 GA R3 2L	1º de Agosto (Angola)	0–0	(Egypt) Zamalek	11 de Novembro, Luanda
14:00 WAT (UTC+1)		Report		Referee: Tsegay Teklu (Eritrea); Eyobel Ghebru, Yohannes Tewelde
Note: Neblú / Bobo, Dani (c), Natael, Paizo / Ary Papel, Ibukun, Kila (substituted off) 69', Mário (substituted off) 83' / Lionel (substituted off) 45', Mabululu — Buá (substituted on) 45', Mongo (substituted on) 69', Macaia (substituted on) 83'

Sat, 25 Jan 2019 GA R2 2L	ZESCO United (Zambia)	1–1	(Angola) 1º de Agosto	Levy Mwanawasa, Ndola
18:00 CAT (UTC+2)	Kalengo 49'		66' Ary Papel	Referee: Mehdi Charef (Algeria); Bouabdalah Omari, Abbes Zerhouni
Note: Neblú / Bobo, Dani (c), Isaac, Natael / Ary Papel, Ibukun (substituted off) 78', Macaia, Mário (substituted off) 45', Nelson (substituted off) 54' / Mabululu — Kila (substituted on) 45', Buá (substituted on) 54', Lionel (substituted on) 78'

Sat, 11 Jan 2019 GA R1 2L	TP Mazembe (Democratic Republic of the Congo)	2–1	(Angola) 1º de Agosto	TP Mazembe, Lubumbashi
15:00 CAT (UTC+2)	Muleka 58', 67'	Report	8' Mabululu	Referee: Souleiman Djama (Guinea); Assts: Salah Mohamed, Mohamed Guedi (Djibouti)
Note: Neblú / Bobo, Dani (c) (substituted off) 79', Isaac (substituted off) 66', Natael / Ary Papel, Macaia, Mário, Nelson / Kila (substituted off) 57', Mabululu — Paizo (substituted on) 57', Buá (substituted on) 66', Mongo (substituted on) 79'

Fri, 27 Dec 2019 GA R3 1L	1º de Agosto (Angola)	1–1	(Democratic Republic of the Congo) TP Mazembe	11 de Novembro, Luanda
17:00 WAT (UTC+1)	Mabululu 11'	Report	7' Kalaba	Referee: Davies Omweno (Kenya); Assts: Gilbert Cheruiyot (Kenya), Dick Okello (Uganda)
Note: Tony / Bobo, Dani (c), Isaac, Natael / Ary Papel (substituted off) 71', Buá, Macaia, Mário / Kila (substituted off) 45', Mabululu — Mongo (substituted on) 45', Nelson (substituted on) 71'

Sat, 07 Dec 2019 GA R2 1L	Zamalek (Egypt)	2–0	(Angola) 1º de Agosto	Cairo International, Cairo
18:00 EST (UTC+2)	Bencharki 16', 67'	Report	(yellow card) 39' (yellow-red card) 70' Ibukun	Referee: Louis Hakizimana (Rwanda)
Note: Tony / Bobo, Dani (c), Isaac, Natael / Atouba, Buá (substituted off) 73', Kila (substituted off) 45', Ibukun / Ary Papel, Mabululu (substituted off) 75' — Zito (substituted on) 45', Bonifácio (substituted on) 73', Mongo (substituted on) 75'

Fri, 29 Nov 2019 GA R1 1L	1º de Agosto (Angola)	1–1	(Zambia) ZESCO United	11 de Novembro, Luanda
17:00 WAT (UTC+1)	Mabululu 9'	Report	16' Mwape	Referee: Andofetra Rakotojaona (Madagascar); Assts: Lionel Andrianantenaina, Randrianarivelo Harizo
Note: Tony / Bobo, Dani (c), Isaac, Paizo / Atouba (substituted off) 75', Kila (substituted off) 69', Ibukun, Macaia (substituted off) 85' / Ary Papel, Mabululu — Buá (substituted on) 69', Zito (substituted on) 75', Mongo (substituted on) 85'

=== First round ===
Sun, 29 Sep 2019 FR 2L	1º de Agosto (Angola)	0–1	(Zambia) Green Eagles	11 de Novembro, Luanda
16:00 WAT (UTC+1)		Report	43' Kaseba	Referee: Bamlak Weyesa (Ethiopia); Temesgin Atango,
Note: Tony / Bobo, Dani (c), Isaac, Paizo / Ary Papel, Ibukun, Kila (substituted off) 86', Macaia / Mabululu (substituted off) 83', Zito (substituted off) 74' — Buá (substituted on) 74', Lionel (substituted on) 83', Nelson (substituted on) 86'

Sat, 14 Sep 2019 FR 1L	Green Eagles (Zambia)	1–2	(Angola) 1º de Agosto	National Heroes, Lusaka
15:00 CAT (UTC+2)	Shamende 76'		28' Mabululu; 85' Kila	Referee: Victor Gomes (South Africa); Assts: Zakhele Siwela, Kgara Mokoena
Note: Tony / Bobo, Dani (c), Isaac, Paizo / Ary Papel, Ibukun, Kila, Macaia / Mabululu (substituted off) 78', Zito (substituted off) 72' — Lionel (substituted on) 78', Nelson (substituted on)

=== Preliminary round ===
Sat, 24 Aug 2019 PR 2L	1º de Agosto (Angola)	2–0	(Zanzibar) KMKM	11 de Novembro, Luanda
17:00 WAT (UTC+1)	Mabululu 34', 68' (pen.)	Report		Referee: Victor Gomes (South Africa); Assts: Zakhele Siwela, Kgara Mokoena
Note: Tony / Bobo, Dani (c), Isaac (substituted off) 83', Paizo / Catraio, Kila (substituted off) 78', Macaia, Nelson / Mabululu, Zito (substituted off) 72' — Mário (substituted on) 72', Melono (substituted on) 78', Cirilo (substituted on) 83'

Sat, 10 Aug 2019 PR 1L	KMKM (Zanzibar)	0–2	(Angola) 1º de Agosto	Amaan Stadium, Zanzibar
16:15 EAT (UTC+3)		Report	71' Ary Papel; 90+1' Lionel	Referee: Ali Chelanget (Uganda); Assts: Mark Ssonko, Isa Masembe
Note: Tony / Bobo, Dani (c), Isaac, Paizo / Ary Papel, Ibukun, Macaia, Nelson / Mabululu, Zito — Buá (substituted on) , Lionel (substituted on)

=== Results summary ===
Overall								Home						Away					
Pld	W	D	L	GF	GA	GD	Pts	W	D	L	GF	GA	GD	W	D	L	GF	GA	GD
10	3	4	3	10	9	+1	13	1	3	1	4	3	+1	2	1	2	6	6	0

Last updated: 1 February 2020.

== Angola Cup ==
=== Round of 16 ===
Wed, 29 Jan 2020 R16 1	J.A.S.	0–1	1º de Agosto	Mangueiras, Saurimo
15:00 WAT (UTC+1)			35' (pen.) Lionel	Referee: Donaciano Mulumba; Alzandre Capola, Ilídio Baptista
Note: Tony / Aldair (substituted off) 65', Bonifácio, Jó, Paizo / Catraio, Kila, Mário (c), Mongo (substituted off) 75' / Lionel, Melono (substituted off) 81' — Manele (substituted on) 65', Fernando (substituted on) 75', Fiete (substituted on) 81'

=== Quarter-finals ===
Wed, 19 Feb 2020 QF 1	1º de Agosto	1–0	Académica Lobito	11 de Novembro, Luanda
17:00 WAT (UTC+1)	Mongo 28'	Report		Referee: Bernardo Nangolo; António Livongue, Pedro Alberto
Note: Tony / Bonifácio, Dani (c), Isaac, Natael / Buá, Macaia, Mário, Mongo (substituted off) 67' / Mabululu, Zito (substituted off) 45' — Atouba (substituted on) 45', Ibukun (substituted on) 67'

Wed, 04 Mar 2020 QF 2	Académica Lobito	1–1	1º de Agosto	Ombaka, Benguela
15:18 WAT (UTC+1)	Odilon 66'	Report	90+3' Bobo	Referee: João Goma; Jerson Emiliano, Wilson Ntyamba
Note: Tony / Bobo, Bonifácio (substituted off) 44', Dani (c), Natael / Atouba, Macaia, Mário, Mongo (substituted off) 73' / Lionel (substituted off) 73', Zito — Isaac (substituted on) 44', Nelson (substituted on) 73', Melono (substituted on) 73'

=== Semi-finals ===
Wed, 18 Mar 2020 SF 1	1º de Agosto	1–0	Bravos do Maquis	11 de Novembro, Luanda
17:00 WAT (UTC+1)	Mabululu 6'			Referee: José Chitumba; Estanislau Guedes, Rosário Calembela
Note: Julião / Bobo, Dani (c), Natael, Paizo / Ary Papel, Buá, Mário, Nelson (substituted off) 67' / Mabululu (substituted off) 68', Zito (substituted off) 73' — Mongo (substituted on) 67', Melono (substituted on) 68', Cirilo (substituted on) 73'

Wed, 08 Apr 2020 SF 2	Bravos do Maquis	Cancelled	1º de Agosto	Mundunduleno, Luena
15:00 WAT (UTC+1)

== Statistics ==
=== Appearances ===
As of 18 March 2020

No.	Pos.	Nat.	Name	Girabola		Angola Cup		CAF Champions League		Super Cup		Total	
No.	Pos.	Nat.	Name	Mins	Apps	Mins	Apps	Mins	Apps	Mins	Apps	Mins	Apps
5	DF	(Angola)	Dani	2070	23	270	3	889	10	180	2	3409	38
4	DF	(Democratic Republic of the Congo)	Bobo	1530	17	180	2	900	10	180	2	2790	31
26	FW	(Angola)	Mabululu	1684	19(4)	158	2	866	10	78	1	2786	32(4)
16	MF	(Angola)	Macaia	1647	18(1)	180	2	722	8(1)	142	2	2691	30(2)
21	DF	(Angola)	Isaac	1552	18	136	1(1)	779	9	180	2	2647	30(1)
19	DF	(Angola)	Paizo	1413	16(3)	180	2	573	6(1)	71	1	2237	25(4)
30	MF	(Angola)	Ary Papel	1119	13(1)	90	1	791	9	180	2	2180	25(1)
12	GK	(Angola)	Tony	990	11	270	3	540	6	180	2	1980	22
3	DF	(Angola)	Natael	952	10(5)	270	3	450	5	109	1(1)	1781	19(6)
10	MF	(Nigeria)	Ibukun	949	12(3)	23	(1)	618	7	180	2	1770	21(4)
11	FW	(Angola)	Zito	1049	11(4)	208	3	348	4(2)	162	2	1767	20(6)
9	MF	(Angola)	Buá	1204	13(5)	180	2	305	2(5)	17	(1)	1706	17(11)
8	MF	(Angola)	Mário	982	11(2)	360	4	326	4(1)	–		1668	19(3)
20	MF	(Democratic Republic of the Congo)	Kila	840	10(3)	90	1	584	8(1)	91	1(1)	1605	20(5)
22	GK	(Angola)	Neblú	1080	12	–		360	4	–		1440	16
14	MF	(Angola)	Nelson	717	6(8)	84	1(1)	352	4(3)	90	1	1243	12(12)
18	MF	(Cameroon)	Atouba	752	9(4)	135	1(1)	165	2	38	(1)	1090	12(6)
13	MF	(Democratic Republic of the Congo)	Mongo	746	10(2)	238	3(1)	97	(5)	1	(1)	1082	13(9)
27	FW	(Cameroon)	Lionel	537	5(9)	163	2	86	1(4)	102	1(1)	815	8(14)
6	DF	(Angola)	Bonifácio	504	6(1)	224	3	17	(1)	–		745	9(2)
15	DF	(Angola)	Jó	220	2(2)	90	1	–		–		310	3(2)
24	MF	(Angola)	Catraio	125	1(3)	90	1	90	1	–		305	3(3)
28	FW	(Angola)	Melono	73	(6)	120	1(2)	12	(1)	–		205	1(9)
1	GK	(Angola)	Julião	–		90	1	–		–		90	1
2	MF	(Angola)	Aldair	15	(1)	65	1	–		–		80	1(1)
7	MF	(Angola)	Cirilo	9	(1)	17	(1)	7	(1)	–		33	(3)
33	MF	(Angola)	Fernando	12	(1)	15	(1)	–		–		27	(2)
34	DF	(Angola)	Manele	–		25	(1)	–		–		25	(1)
–	MF	(Angola)	Fiete	–		9	(1)	–		–		9	(1)

=== Scorers ===
As of 18 March 2020

No.	Pos.	Nat.	Name	Girabola		Angola Cup		CAF Champions League		Super Cup		Total	
No.	Pos.	Nat.	Name	Mins	Gls	Mins	Gls	Mins	Gls	Mins	Gls	Mins	Gls
1	FW	(Angola)	Mabululu	1684	12	158	1	866	6	78	0	2786	19
2	MF	(Angola)	Ary Papel	1119	9	90	0	791	2	180	1	2180	12
3	FW	(Cameroon)	Lionel	537	4	163	1	86	1	102	1	888	7
4	FW	(Angola)	Zito	1049	5	208	0	350	0	162	0	1767	5
5	FW	(Angola)	Melono	73	2	120	0	12	0	–		205	2
5	MF	(Democratic Republic of the Congo)	Mongo	746	1	238	1	97	0	3	0	1082	2
5	MF	(Cameroon)	Atouba	752	2	135	0	165	0	38	0	1090	2
5	MF	(Angola)	Nelson	717	2	84	0	352	0	90	0	1243	2
5	MF	(Democratic Republic of the Congo)	Kila	840	1	90	0	584	1	91	0	1588	2
5	DF	(Democratic Republic of the Congo)	Bobo	1530	1	180	1	900	0	180	0	2790	2
6	MF	(Angola)	Buá	1204	1	180	0	305	0	17	0	1706	1
6	DF	(Angola)	Paizo	1413	1	180	0	573	0	71	0	2237	1
Opponents
–	DF	(Angola)	Massadila	–	1	–		–		–		–	1
Total					42		4		10		2		58

=== Clean sheets ===
As of 18 March 2020

No.	Pos.	Nat.	Name	Girabola		Angola Cup		CAF Champions League		Super Cup		Total	
No.	Pos.	Nat.	Name	Apps	CS	Apps	CS	Apps	CS	Apps	CS	Apps	CS
12	GK	(Angola)	Tony Cabaça	11	6	3	2	6	2	2	1	22	11
22	GK	(Angola)	Neblú	12	6	–		4	1	–		16	7
1	GK	(Angola)	Julião	–		1	1	–		–		1	1
Total					12		3		3		1		19

=== Disciplinary record ===
As of 18 March 2020

No.	Pos.	Nat.	Name	Girabola			Angola Cup			CAF Champions League			Super Cup			Total		
No.	Pos.	Nat.	Name	Yellow card	Double yellow card	Red card	Yellow card	Double yellow card	Red card	Yellow card	Double yellow card	Red card	Yellow card	Double yellow card	Red card	Yellow card	Double yellow card	Red card
21	DF	(Angola)	Isaac	4	1					2						6	1	
10	MF	(Nigeria)	Ibukun	2						1	1		1			4	1	
4	DF	(Democratic Republic of the Congo)	Bobo	3			2			1						6		
26	FW	(Angola)	Mabululu	3			1			2						6		
8	MF	(Angola)	Mário	4			1									5		
16	MF	(Angola)	Macaia	3						1						4		
3	DF	(Angola)	Natael	3												3		
5	DF	(Angola)	Dani	3												3		
9	MF	(Angola)	Buá	2			1									3		
12	GK	(Angola)	Tony Cabaça	2									1			3		
30	MF	(Angola)	Ary Papel	1									2			3		
13	MF	(Democratic Republic of the Congo)	Mongo	1			1									2		
20	MF	(Democratic Republic of the Congo)	Kila	2												2		
1	GK	(Angola)	Julião				1									1		
6	DF	(Angola)	Bonifácio	1												1		
14	MF	(Angola)	Nelson	1												1		
15	DF	(Angola)	Jó				1									1		
19	DF	(Angola)	Paizo	1												1		
27	FW	(Cameroon)	Lionel				1									1		
Total				35			9			7	1		4			55	2	

=== Season progress ===
2/8	5/8	10/8	21/8	24/8	27/8	31/8	14/9	18/9	22/9	29/9	6/10	13/10	20/10	23/10	27/10	3/11	23/11	30/11	7/12	15/12	18/12	22/12	27/12	11/1	19/1	25/1	29/1	1/2	8/2	12/2	16/2	19/2	23/2	26/2	1/3	4/3	8/3	14/3	18/3
DES	DES	KMK	DES	KMK	PRO	SAG	GRE	FER	SRC	GRE	CCU	INT	CAA	MAQ	~~MAI~~	PET	LIB	ZES	ZAM	ACA	SCC	WIL	TPM	TPM	PRO	ZES	JAS	ZAM	FER	DES	SRC	ACA	CAA	SAG	CCU	ACA	INT	MAQ	MAQ
Super Cup		CH	GB	CH	Girabola		CH	Girabola		CH	Girabola							Champions		Girabola			Champions		GB	CH	AC	CH	Girabola			AC	Girabola			AC	Girabola		AC

== See also ==
- List of C.D. Primeiro de Agosto players
