= 2018–19 C.D. Primeiro de Agosto season =

Clube Desportivo Primeiro de Agosto
2018–19 season
- President: Gen. Carlos Hendrick
- Manager: Dragan Jović (Nov 2018–)
- Stadium: Estádio 11 de Novembro
- Girabola: Champion
- Angola Cup: Winner
- Angola Super Cup: n/a
- Champions League: Preliminary round
- Top goalscorer: League: Mabululu (14); All: Mabululu (17)
- Biggest win: D'Agosto 5–0 S^{ta} Rita (1 Dec 2018)
- Biggest defeat: AS Otôho 2–0 D'Agosto (5 Dec 2018)
Home colours	Away colours	Third colours
- All statistics correct as of 25 May 2019.

The 2018–19 season of Clube Desportivo Primeiro de Agosto is the club's 41st season in the Girabola, the Angolan Premier football League and 41st consecutive season in the top flight of Angolan football. In 2019, the club is participating in the Girabola, the Angola Cup and the 2018–19 CAF Champions League.

== FAF Penalty ==
As a result of a match-fixing investigation launched by the Angolan Football Federation (FAF) on the 17th round match between Desportivo da Huila and 1º de Agosto, each team forfeited 3 points and a $5,000 fine.

== Squad information ==
=== Players ===
No.	Nat	Nick	Name	Pos	Date of birth (age)
Goalkeepers
12	(Angola)	Tony Cabaça	Adão Joaquim Bango Cabaça	–	23 April 1986 (aged 33)
22	(Angola)	Neblú	Adilson Cipriano da Cruz	–	16 December 1993 (aged 26)
29	(Angola)	Nsesani	Nsesani Emanuel Simão	–	5 November 2000 (aged 19)
Defenders
3	(Angola)	Natael	Natael Paulo Masuekama	LB	23 September 1993 (aged 26)
4	(Democratic Republic of the Congo)	Bobo	Beaudrick Muselenge Ungenda	CB	19 November 1989 (aged 30)
5	(Angola)	Dani (c)	Massunguna Alex Afonso	CB	1 May 1986 (aged 33)
6	(Angola)	Bonifácio	Bonifácio Francisco Caetano	CB	9 August 1993 (aged 26)
15	(Nigeria)	Yisa	Kehinde Yisa Anifowoshe	CB	11 October 1992 (aged 27)
19	(Angola)	Paizo	Salomão Manuel Troco	LB	10 May 1992 (aged 27)
21	(Angola)	Isaac	Isaac Correia da Costa	RB	25 April 1991 (aged 28)
Midfielders
8	(Angola)	Mário Balbúrdia	Mário César Azevedo Alves Balbúrdia	MF	19 August 1997 (aged 22)
7	(Angola)	Mingo Bile	Régio Francisco Congo Zalata	RW	15 June 1987 (aged 32)
9	(Angola)	Buá	Luvumbo Lourenço Pedro	DM	6 September 1988 (aged 31)
10	(Nigeria)	Ibukun	Ibukun Akinfenwa	CM	22 October 1990 (aged 29)
14	(Angola)	Nelson	Nelson Coquenão da Luz	MF	4 February 1998 (aged 21)
16	(Angola)	Macaia	José Macaia Ganga	CM	24 March 1994 (aged 25)
20	(Democratic Republic of the Congo)	Kila	Emmanuel Christian Ngudikama	MF	7 April 1987 (aged 32)
23	(Angola)	Show	Manuel Luís da Silva Cafumana	MF	6 March 1999 (aged 20)
24	(Angola)	Vanilson	Vanilson Tita Zéu	MF	20 March 1999 (aged 20)
28	(Angola)	Melono	Melono Muondo Dala	LW	25 August 2001 (aged 18)
30	(Angola)	Ary Papel	Manuel David Afonso	LW	6 May 1994 (aged 25)
31	(Angola)	Cirilo	Cirilo Van-Dúnem da Silva	MF	2 March 1998 (aged 21)
Forwards
13	(Democratic Republic of the Congo)	Mongo	Kipe Mongo Lompala Bokamba	–	22 August 1993 (aged 26)
17	(Democratic Republic of the Congo)	Dago	Tshibamba Samu	–	3 September 1997 (aged 22)
18	(Brazil)	Aquino	Anderson Angus Aquino	–	18 December 1986 (aged 33)
26	(Angola)	Mabululu	Agostinho Cristóvão Paciência	–	1 June 1992 (aged 27)

=== Staff ===
Nat	Name	Position(s)	Date of birth (age)
Technical staff
(Bosnia and Herzegovina)	Dragan Jović	Head coach	19 June 1963 (aged 56)
(Angola)	Filipe Nzanza	Assistant coach	19 May 1969 (aged 50)
(Angola)	Ivo Traça	Assistant coach	19 May 1961 (aged 58)
(Angola)	Napoleão Brandão	Goalkeeper coach	13 June 1952 (aged 67)
Medical
(Cuba)	Abel Sanz	Physician	–
(Angola)	Leonilde Ferreira	Psychotherapist	–
(Angola)	Jorge Nabais	Fitness coach	–
(Angola)	Feliciano Madalena	Physio	–
(Angola)	Andrade Mendes	Physio	–
Management
(Angola)	Gen. Carlos Hendrick	Chairman	–
(Angola)	Paulo Magueijo	Vice-Chairman	–
(Angola)	José Marcelino	Head of Foot Dept	–
(Angola)	Carlos Alves	Spokesman	–

=== Pre-season transfers ===
No.	Nat	Nick	Name	Pos	Date of Birth (Age)	
Transfers out To
6	(Angola)	Gogoró	João Ngunza Muanha	MF	6 June 1995 (aged 24)	Desportivo Huíla
25	(Angola)	Catraio	Zinedine Moisés Catraio	MF	17 June 1998 (aged 21)	Desportivo Huíla
27	(Nigeria)	Razaq	Razaq Akanni Adegbite	FW	20 December 1992 (aged 27)	Desportivo Huíla
Transfers in From
18	(Brazil)	Aquino	Anderson Angus Aquino	FW	18 December 1986 (aged 33)	Ituano FC
30	(Angola)	Ary Papel	Manuel David Afonso	MF	3 March 1994 (aged 25)	Moreirense
26	(Angola)	Mabululu	Agostinho Cristóvão Paciência	FW	1 June 1992 (aged 27)	Domant FC
25	(Angola)	Nandinho	Fernando Manuel Morais	MF	24 May 1997 (aged 22)	Desportivo Huíla
29	(Angola)	Nsesani	Nsesani Emanuel Simão	GK	5 November 2000 (aged 19)	Junior team
2	(Angola)	Zé	Osvaldo Paulo Ventura	DF	3 August 1996 (aged 23)	Desportivo Huíla

=== Mid-season transfers ===
No.	Nat	Nick	Name	Pos	Date of Birth (Age)	
Transfers out To
1	(Angola)	Julião	Justo Mateus Pucusso	GK	15 July 1992 (aged 27)	Recreativo da Caála
2	(Angola)	Zé	Osvaldo Paulo Ventura	DF	3 August 1996 (aged 23)	Desportivo da Huíla
11	(Angola)	Geraldo	Hermenegildo da Costa Paulo Bartolomeu	LW	23 November 1991 (aged 27)	(Egypt) Al Ahly SC
17	(Angola)	Guelor	Anderson Benjamim	FW	10 August 1989 (aged 30)	Académica do Lobito
20	(Democratic Republic of the Congo)	Jacques	Jacques Bakulu Bitumba	FW	28 August 1993 (aged 26)	Desportivo da Huíla
Transfers in From
17	(Democratic Republic of the Congo)	Dago	Tshibamba Samu	FW	3 September 1997 (aged 22)	(Democratic Republic of the Congo) DC Motema Pembe
20	(Democratic Republic of the Congo)	Kila	Emmanuel Christian Ngudikama	MF	7 April 1987 (aged 32)	(Democratic Republic of the Congo) AS Vita Club

== Overview ==
Competition	First match	Last match	Final position	Record							
Competition	First match	Last match	Final position	Pld	W	D	L	GF	GA	GD	Win %
Girabola	30 October 2018	19 May 2019	Winner	30	20	10	0	51	9	+42	66.67
Angola Cup	8 May 2019	25 May 2019	Winner	4	4	0	0	6	2	+4	100.00
CAF Champions League	28 November 2018	5 December 2018	Preliminary round	2	1	0	1	4	4	+0	50.00
Total				36	25	10	1	61	15	+46	69.44

Last updated: 25 May 2018

== CAF Champions League ==
=== Preliminary round ===
Wed, 05 Dec 2018 PR 2L	AS Otôho (Republic of the Congo)	2–0	(Angola) 1º de Agosto	Marien Ngouabi, Owando
15:30 WAT (UTC+1)	Bagayoko 45+2' (pen.); Mbenza 90+2'	Report		Referee: Pierre Atcho; Angelo Mambana, Felix Eyaga (Gabon)
Note: Tony / Bobo, Dani (c), Isaac (substituted off) 75', Paizo / Geraldo (substituted off) 60', Macaia, Mongo, Show / Jacques, Mabululu (substituted off) 87' — M.Bile (substituted in) 60', Yisa (substituted in) 75', Mário (substituted in) 87'

Wed, 28 Nov 2018 PR 1L	1º de Agosto (Angola)	4–2	(Republic of the Congo) AS Otôho	11 de Novembro, Luanda
16:00 WAT (UTC+1)	Mongo 29'; Geraldo 37' (pen.), 60'; Jacques 88'	Report	22' Kivutuka; 25' Konte	Referee: Ganesh Chutooree; Sailesh Gobin, Akhtar Rossaye (Mauritius)
Note: Tony / Bobo, Dani (c), Guelor (substituted off) 46', Isaac / Ary, Buá, Geraldo (substituted off) 65', Show / Mabululu (substituted off) 74', Mongo — M.Bile (substituted in) 46', Aquino (substituted in) 65', Jacques (substituted in) 74'

=== Results summary ===
Overall								Home						Away					
Pld	W	D	L	GF	GA	GD	Pts	W	D	L	GF	GA	GD	W	D	L	GF	GA	GD
2	1	0	1	4	4	0	3	1	0	0	4	2	+2	0	0	1	0	2	−2

Last updated: 5 December 2018.

== Angolan League ==
=== League table ===
Pos	Team	Pld	W	D	L	GF	GA	GD	Pts	Qualification or relegation (Note: No teams enter the Confederation Cup. Desportivo da Huíla are Angola Cup runners-up (Primeiro de Agosto are cup winners) but declined to participate, while Kabuscorp were relegated and thus not eligible.)
1	Primeiro de Agosto (Note: Primeiro de Agosto and Desportivo da Huíla forfeited 3 points on suspicion of match-fixing on the 17th round match.) (C)	30	20	10	0	51	9	+42	67	Qualification for Champions League
2	Petro de Luanda	30	19	7	4	40	15	+25	64	Qualification for Champions League
3	Desportivo da Huíla	30	15	8	7	36	25	+11	50	
4	Kabuscorp (Note: Kabuscorp had forfeited 9 points as a result of payment default. On appeal, after the plaintiffs dropped their claims, all points were restored. Regarding their dispute with former player Rivaldo, the club was ordered to be relegated by FIFA for failing to pay the outstanding debt within the established deadline.) (R)	30	13	10	7	35	26	+9	49	Relegation to Provincial stages
5	Interclube	30	11	11	8	27	22	+5	44	

Source: Girabola.com
Rules for classification: 1) Points; 2) Head-to-head points; 3) Goal difference; 4) Head-to-head goal difference; 5) Goals scored; 6) Fair-play points; 7) Play-off.
(C) Champions; (R) Relegated

=== Match details ===
Tue, 30 Oct 2018 01	Interclube	0–0	1º de Agosto	22 de Junho, Luanda
15:00 WAT (UTC+1)		Report		Referee: Hélder Martins; Júlio Lemos, Joaquim Rocha
Note: Tony / Bobo, Dani (c), Isaac, Paizo / Ary, Buá, Macaia (substituted off) 44', Show / Mongo (substituted off) 88', Jacques (substituted off) 67' — Mário (substituted in) 44', M.Bile (substituted in) 67', Melono (substituted in) 88'

Sun, 04 Nov 2018 02	1º de Agosto	2–0	Desportivo Huíla	11 de Novembro, Luanda
17:00 WAT (UTC+1)	Mabululu 23'; Buá 40'	Report		Referee: Chitano Francisco; Wilson Ntyamba, Jeremias
Note: Tony (c) / Bobo, Isaac, Paizo, Yisa / Ary (substituted off) 90+1', Buá, Mário, Show / Mabululu (substituted off) 81', Mongo (substituted off) 46' — Geraldo (substituted in) 46', M.Bile (substituted in) 81', Jacques (substituted in) 90+1'

Thu, 22 Nov 2018 03	ASA	0–3	1º de Agosto	Coqueiros, Luanda
18:00 WAT (UTC+1)		Report	57' Mabululu; 76' Aquino; 81' Bobo	Referee: Mauro de Oliveira; Domingos Francisco, Nery Silva
Note: Tony / Bobo, Dani (c), Isaac, Paizo / Ary, Buá (substituted off) 83', Geraldo, Show / Mabululu (substituted off) 80', Mongo (substituted off) 67' — Aquino (substituted in) 67', Jacques (substituted in) 80', Mário (substituted in) 83'

Sat, 01 Dec 2018 04	1º de Agosto	5–0	S^{ta} Rita de Cássia	11 de Novembro, Luanda
17:30 WAT (UTC+1)	Mabululu 14', 29'; Paizo 46'; Ary 55', 88' (pen.)	Report		Referee: Feliciano Lucas; Horácio Tchissingue, Alexandre Bengue
Note: Tony / Bobo, Dani (c), M.Bile, Paizo / Ary, Buá (substituted off) 73', Macaia, Show (substituted off) 54' / Jacques, Mabululu (substituted off) 59' — Mário (substituted in) 54', Cirilo (substituted in) 59', Aquino (substituted in) 73'

Sun, 09 Dec 2018 05	Académica	0–1	1º de Agosto	Ombaka, Benguela
15:30 WAT (UTC+1)		Report	64' Mongo	Referee: João Goma; José Felix, Dário Gaspar
Note: Tony / Dani (c), Isaac, Paizo, Yisa / Buá (substituted off) 70', M.Bile (substituted off) 83', Mongo, Show / Jacques (substituted off) 61', Mabululu — Nelson (substituted in) 61', Macaia (substituted in) 70', Aquino (substituted in) 83'

Thu, 13 Dec 2018 06	1º de Agosto	0–0	Progresso	11 de Novembro, Luanda
17:30 WAT (UTC+1)		Report		Referee: António Caxala; Júlio Lemos, Joaquim Rocha
Note: Tony / Bobo, Dani (c), Isaac, Paizo / Buá, M.Bile (substituted in) 58', Mário (substituted off) 57', Mongo, Show / Mabululu (substituted off) 80' — Nelson (substituted in) 57', Aquino (substituted in) 58', Macaia (substituted in) 80'

Wed, 19 Dec 2018 07	Rec do Libolo	0–0	1º de Agosto	Estádio Municipal, Calulo
15:00 WAT (UTC+1)				Referee: Benjamin Andrade; Bernabé Ngulo, Ricardo Daniel
Note: Tony / Bobo, Dani (c), Isaac, Paizo / Ary (substituted off) 68', Buá (substituted off) 67', Mário, Mongo, Show / Mabululu (substituted off) 86' — Aquino (substituted in) 67', Nelson (substituted in) 68', M.Bile (substituted in) 86'

Sat, 29 Dec 2018 09	Saurimo FC	0–0	1º de Agosto	Mangueiras, Saurimo
15:00 WAT (UTC+1)		Report		Referee: Sabino de Carvalho; Pedro Futa, Ladislau Miguel
Note: Tony / Bobo, Dani (c), Isaac, Paizo / Ary, Buá (substituted off) 57', Mário (substituted off) 66', Mongo, Show / Jacques (substituted off) 58' — Nelson (substituted in) 57', Mabululu (substituted in) 58', Aquino (substituted in) 66'

Sun, 06 Jan 2019 10	1º de Agosto	1–0	Sporting Cabinda	11 de Novembro, Luanda
17:00 WAT (UTC+1)	Show 42'	Report		Referee: Tânia Duarte; Luísa Luhaco, Andália Jeremias
Note: Tony / Bobo, Dani (c), Isaac, Paizo / Ary, Macaia (substituted off) 85', Nelson (substituted off) 64', Show / Mabululu (substituted off) 74', Mongo — Buá (substituted in) 64', M.Bile (substituted in) 74', Mário (substituted in) 85'

Thu, 10 Jan 2019 11	Rec da Caála	0–2	1º de Agosto	Mártires da Canhala, Caála
15:00 WAT (UTC+1)		Report	27', 40' Nelson	Referee: Miguel Mateus; Celestino Golombole, Celso António
Note: Tony / Bobo, Dani (c) (substituted off) 16', Isaac, Paizo / Macaia, Mário, Mongo (substituted off) 85', Nelson (substituted off) 74', Show / Ary — Yisa (substituted in) 16', M.Bile (substituted in) 74', Buá (substituted in) 85'

Wed, 16 Jan 2019 12	1º de Agosto	3–3	Sagrada	11 de Novembro, Luanda
17:30 WAT (UTC+1)	Ary Papel 8'; Jó 23' (o.g.); Mongo 67'	Report	7', 45+2' Jiresse; 82' Cachi	Referee: Paulo Sérgio; Segunda Tchisseque, Lídio Coimbra
Note: Tony (c) / Bobo, Isaac, Paizo, Yisa / Buá (substituted off) 70', Macaia (substituted off) 84', Mongo, Nelson (substituted off) 82', Show / Ary — Mário (substituted in) 70', Mabululu (substituted in) 82', Cirilo (substituted in) 84'

Sun, 20 Jan 2019 13	Bravos Maquis	0–0	1º de Agosto	Mundunduleno, Luena
15:00 WAT (UTC+1)		Report		Referee: José Álvaro; Estanislau Guedes, Rosário Calembela
Note: Tony (c) / Bobo, M.Bile, Paizo, Yisa / Macaia, Mário, Mongo, Nelson (substituted off) 90+5' / Guelor (substituted off) 72', Vanilson (substituted off) 46' — Buá (substituted in) 46', Melono (substituted in) 72', Isaac (substituted in) 90+5'

Sun, 27 Jan 2019 14	1º de Agosto	1–0	Cuando Cubango	11 de Novembro, Luanda
17:00 WAT (UTC+1)	Mabululu 54'	Report		Referee: Donaciano Mulumba; Alzandre Capola, Ilídio Baptista
Note: Tony (c) / Bobo, Isaac, Paizo, Yisa / Mário (substituted off) 45', M.Bile (substituted off) 46', Show, Nelson / Mabululu, Mongo (substituted off) 75' — Vanilson (substituted in) 45', Buá (substituted in) 46', Macaia (substituted in) 75'

Sun, 03 Feb 2019 15	1º de Agosto	2–0	Kabuscorp	11 de Novembro, Luanda
17:30 WAT (UTC+1)	Macaia 38'; Mabululu 46'	Report		Referee: Paulo Talaya; Ricardo Daniel, Joaquim Chiyo
Note: Tony / Bobo, Dani (c), Isaac, Paizo / Buá (substituted off) 46', Macaia, Show, Nelson / Mabululu (substituted off) 76', Mongo (substituted off) 80' — Mário (substituted in) 46', Jacques (substituted in) 76', Vanilson (substituted in) 80'

Sat, 09 Feb 2019 08	1º de Agosto	1–0	Petro Atlético	11 de Novembro, Luanda
16:00 WAT (UTC+1)	Dani 38'	Report		Referee: João Goma; Jerson Emiliano, Ivanildo Lopes
Note: Tony / Bobo, Dani (c), Isaac, Paizo / Macaia, Mongo (substituted off) 46', Nelson, Show / Ary (substituted off) 79', Mabululu (substituted off) 60' — Buá (substituted in) 46', Jacques (substituted in) 60', Mário (substituted in) 79'

Wed, 27 Feb 2019 16	1º de Agosto	0–0	Interclube	11 de Novembro, Luanda
17:00 WAT (UTC+1)		Report		Referee: Nuno Eduardo; Manuel Benguela, Judith Mestre
Note: Tony / Bobo, Dani (c), Isaac, Paizo / Macaia, Mongo (substituted off) 66', Nelson, Show / Ary, Aquino (substituted off) 46' — Buá (substituted in) 46', Mabululu (substituted in) 66'

Sun, 03 Mar 2019 17	Desportivo Huíla	3–3	1º de Agosto	Estádio do Ferrovia, Lubango
15:00 WAT (UTC+1)	Lionel 31'; Milton 71'; Manico 76'	Report	32' Kila; 82' Vanilson; 88' Ary	Referee: Airton Carmelino; Evanildo Martins, Ivanildo Lopes
Note: Tony (c) / Bobo, Isaac, Natael, Yisa / Kila, Macaia (substituted off) 73', Nelson (substituted off) 46', Show / Ary, Dago (substituted off) 67' — Vanilson (substituted in) 46', Mabululu (substituted in) 67', Buá (substituted in) 73'

Fri, 08 Mar 2019 18	1º de Agosto	4–0	ASA	11 de Novembro, Luanda
17:00 WAT (UTC+1)	Mabululu 17', 48'; Mongo 32'; Kila 59'	Report		Referee: Bernardo Nangolo; Pedro Alberto, António Pitra
Note: Tony / Bobo, Dani (c), Isaac, Natael / Buá, Macaia, Mário, Mongo (substituted off) 61' / Kila (substituted off) 67', Mabululu (substituted off) 71' — Vanilson (substituted in) 61', Ary (substituted in) 67', Dago (substituted in) 71'

Wed, 13 Mar 2019 19	S^{ta} Rita de Cássia	0–1	1º de Agosto	4 de Janeiro, Uíge
15:00 WAT (UTC+1)		Report	74' Mabululu	Referee: José Maxia; Cláudio Vunge, Flávio Dias
Note: Tony / Bobo, Dani (c), Isaac, Natael / Buá (substituted off) 60', Mário (substituted off) 67', Mongo (substituted off) 68', Show / Kila, Mabululu — Dago (substituted in) 60', Aquino (substituted in) 67', Ary (substituted in) 68'

Sun, 17 Mar 2019 20	1º de Agosto	1–0	Académica	11 de Novembro, Luanda
17:00 WAT (UTC+1)	Dani 87'	Report		Referee: Tânia Duarte; Andália Jeremias, Luísa Luhaco
Note: Tony / Bobo, Dani (c), M.Bile (substituted off) 70', Paizo / Buá (substituted off) 47', Mário (substituted off) 46', Mongo, Show / Kila, Mabululu — Macaia (substituted in) 46', Ary (substituted in) 47', Dago (substituted in) 70'

Fri, 29 Mar 2019 21	Progresso	0–3	1º de Agosto	Coqueiros, Luanda
17:00 WAT (UTC+1)		Report	18', 30' Mabululu; 59' Ary Papel	Referee: Paulo Sérgio; Segunda Tchisseque, Ilídio Coimbra
Note: Neblú / Bobo, Dani (c) (substituted off) 65', Isaac, Paizo / Ary, Buá (substituted off) 74', Macaia, Show / Kila (substituted off) 46', Mabululu — Mongo (substituted in) 46', Bonifácio (substituted in) 65', Aquino (substituted in) 74'

Tue, 02 Apr 2019 22	1º de Agosto	3–0	Rec do Libolo	11 de Novembro, Luanda
17:00 WAT (UTC+1)	Bobo 13'; Macaia 16'; Show 45'	Report		Referee: Feliciano Lucas; Horácio Tchissingue, Alexandre Bengue
Note: Neblú / Bobo, Dani (c), Isaac (substituted off) 55', Paizo / Ary, Buá (substituted off) 59', Macaia, Show / Kila (substituted off) 36', Mabululu — Mongo (substituted in) 36', Natael (substituted in) 55', Dago (substituted in) 59'

Sun, 07 Apr 2019 23	Petro Atlético	0–0	1º de Agosto	11 de Novembro, Luanda
16:00 WAT (UTC+1)		Report		Referee: Hélder Martins; Jerson Emiliano, Ivanildo Lopes
Note: Neblú / Bobo, Dani (c), Isaac, Paizo / Ary, Buá (substituted off) 71', Macaia, Show / Mongo, Mabululu (substituted off) 82' — Dago (substituted in) 71', Mário (substituted in) 82'

Sun, 14 Apr 2019 24	1º de Agosto	2–0	Saurimo FC	11 de Novembro, Luanda
17:00 WAT (UTC+1)	Dago 36'; Mabululu 43'	Report		Referee: Donaciano Mulumba; Alzandro Capola, Ilídio Baptista
Note: Neblú / Bobo, Dani (c), Isaac, Paizo / Ary (substituted off) 76', Buá (substituted off) 23', Macaia, Show / Mongo (substituted off) 70', Mabululu — Dago (substituted in) 23', Natael (substituted in) 70', Mário (substituted in) 76'

Wed, 17 Apr 2019 25	Sporting Cabinda	2–4	1º de Agosto	Tafe, Cabinda
15:00 WAT (UTC+1)	Fundo 44'; Gláucio I 80'		18' Mongo; 20' Dago; 50' Dani; 55' Paizo	Referee: António Caxala; Evandro Rocha, Aldair Carmelino
Note: Tony / Bobo, Dani (c), Isaac, Paizo / Ary, Dago (substituted off) , Macaia, Show / Mongo (substituted off) , Mabululu — Natael (substituted in) , Mário (substituted in)

Sat, 20 Apr 2019 26	1º de Agosto	1–0	Rec da Caála	11 de Novembro, Luanda
17:00 WAT (UTC+1)	Ary Papel 54' (pen.)			Referee: José Álvaro; Estanislau Guedes, Jeremias Cafussa
Note: Tony / Bobo (substituted off) 87', Dani (c), Isaac, Paizo / Ary, Dago, Macaia, Show / Mongo (substituted off) 78', Mabululu (substituted off) 46' — Aquino (substituted in) 46', Natael (substituted in) 78', Mário (substituted in) 87'

Wed, 24 Apr 2019 27	Sagrada	1–1	1º de Agosto	Sagrada Esperança, Dundo
15:00 WAT (UTC+1)	Dago 35'		20' (o.g.) Paizo	Referee: Sabino de Carvalho; Pedro Futa, Ladislau Miguel
Note: Tony / Bonifácio, Dani (c), Isaac, Paizo / Ary (substituted off) 77', Dago, Macaia, Show / Mongo, Mabululu (substituted off) 37' — Buá (substituted in) 37', Nelson (substituted in) 77', Aquino (substituted in)

Sun, 28 Apr 2019 28	1º de Agosto	3–0	Bravos Maquis	11 de Novembro, Luanda
17:00 WAT (UTC+1)	Bobo 13'; Buá 82'; Ary Papel 90+1'			Referee: António Dungula; Tito Capingala, José Silyia
Note: Tony / Bobo, Dani (c), Isaac, Paizo (substituted off) 82' / Aquino (substituted off) 70', Dago, Macaia, Show / Ary, Mongo (substituted off) 46' — Nelson (substituted in) 46', Buá (substituted in) 70', Natael (substituted in) 82'

Sun, 12 May 2019 29	Cuando Cubango	0–3	1º de Agosto	Municipal, Menongue
15:00 WAT (UTC+1)		Report	48' Mabululu; 54' Zito; 87' Papel	Referee: Chitano Francisco; Wilson Ntyamba, Andália Jeremias
Note: Tony / Bobo, Dani (c), Isaac, Natael / Aquino (substituted off) 46', Dago, Macaia, Show / Mabululu (substituted off) 85', Zito (substituted off) 68' — Ary (substituted in) 46', Nelson (substituted in) 68', Mongo (substituted in) 85'

Sun, 19 May 2019 30	Kabuscorp	0–1	1º de Agosto	Coqueiros, Luanda
15:00 WAT (UTC+1)		Report	45+1' Mabululu	Referee: Nuno Eduardo; Judith Mestre, Manuel Benguela
Note: Tony / Bobo, Dani (c), Isaac, Natael / Ary (substituted off) 90+3', Dago, Macaia, Show / Mabululu (substituted off) 76', Zito (substituted off) 78' — Aquino (substituted in) 76', Nelson (substituted in) 78', Buá (substituted in) 90+3'

=== Results ===
==== Results summary ====
Overall								Home						Away					
Pld	W	D	L	GF	GA	GD	Pts	W	D	L	GF	GA	GD	W	D	L	GF	GA	GD
30	20	10	0	51	9	+42	70	12	3	0	27	3	+24	8	7	0	24	6	+18

Last updated: 19 May 2019.

==== Results by round ====
Round	1	2	3	4	5	6	7	8	9	10	11	12	13	14	15	16	17	18	19	20	21	22	23	24	25	26	27	28	29	30
Ground	A	H	A	H	A	H	A	H	A	H	A	H	A	H	H	H	A	H	A	H	A	H	A	H	A	H	A	H	A	A
Result	D	W	W	W	W	D	D	W	D	W	W	D	D	W	W	D	D	W	W	W	W	W	D	W	W	W	D	W	W	W
Position	11	2	1	1	1	1	1	1	1	1	1	1	1	1	1	1	2	2	2	1	1	1	1	1	1	1	1	1	1	1

Updated to match(es) played on 19 May 2019. Source: girabolazap.co.ao
A = Away; H = Home; W = Win; D = Draw; L = Loss

==== Results overview ====
Win Draw Loss

Team	Home score	Away score
Interclube	0-0	0-0
Desportivo da Huíla	2–0	3-3
ASA	4–0	3–0
Santa Rita de Cássia FC	5–0	1–0
Académica do Lobito	1–0	1–0
Progresso do Sambizanga	0-0	3–0
Recreativo do Libolo	3–0	0-0
Petro de Luanda	1–0	0-0
Saurimo FC	2–0	0-0
Sporting de Cabinda	1–0	4–2
Recreativo da Caála	1–0	2–0
Sagrada Esperança	3-3	1-1
Bravos do Maquis	3–0	0-0
Cuando Cubango FC	1–0	3–0
Kabuscorp	2–0	1–0

== Angola Cup ==
=== Round of 16 ===
Wed, 08 May 2019 R16	Cuando Cubango	0–1	1º de Agosto	Eucaliptos, Kuito
15:00 WAT (UTC+1)		Report	35' (pen.) Mabululu	Referee: Paulo Talaia; Ricardo Daniel, Joaquim Chiyo
Note: Neblú / Bonifácio, Bobo, M.Bile, Natael / Aquino (substituted off) , Dago, Mário, Macaia / Mabululu (substituted off) 70', Zito — Paizo (substituted in) 44', Buá (substituted in) , Ary (substituted in) 70'

=== Quarter finals ===
Wed, 15 May 2019 QF	Progresso	1–2	1º de Agosto	Coqueiros, Luanda
15:00 WAT (UTC+1)	Chiló 2'	Report	20', 85' Mabululu	Referee: Paulo Talaia; Judith Mestre, Ricardo Daniel
Note: Neblú / Dani, Bonifácio, M.Bile, Natael / Buá (substituted off) 46', Mário, Nelson (substituted off) 47', Show / Mabululu, Mongo (substituted off) 72' — Dago (substituted in) 46', Aquino (substituted in) 47', Ary (substituted in) 72'

=== Semi finals ===
Wed, 22 May 2019 SF	1º de Agosto	1–0	Petro de Luanda	11 de Novembro, Luanda
16:00 WAT (UTC+1)	Dago 72'	Report		Referee: Hélder Martins; Evanildo Martins, Ivanildo Lopes
Note: Neblú / Bobo, Dani (c), Isaac, Paizo / Ary, Dago, Macaia, Show / Mabululu (substituted off) 90+1', Zito (substituted off) 68' — Nelson (substituted in) 68', Buá (substituted in) 90+1'

=== Final ===
Sat, 25 May 2019
15:38

Primeiro de Agosto	2–1	Desportivo da Huíla
Zito 59'; Papel 63' (pen.)	Report	45+1' Lionel

11 de Novembro, Luanda
Attendance: 5,000
Referee: Benjamin Andrade

D'Agosto	Desportivo

GK	12	(Angola)	Tony
RB	21	(Angola)	Isaac	(yellow card) 90+2'
CB	4	(Democratic Republic of the Congo)	Bobo	(yellow card) 53'
CB	5	(Angola)	Dani (c)
LB	19	(Angola)	Paizo	(yellow card) 83'
RM	17	(Democratic Republic of the Congo)	Dago
CM	8	(Angola)	Mário		(substituted off) 47'
CM	16	(Angola)	Macaia
LM	13	(Democratic Republic of the Congo)	Mongo		(substituted off) 46'
FW	11	(Angola)	Zito		(substituted off) 88'
FW	30	(Angola)	Ary Papel
Substitutions:
MF	18	(Brazil)	Aquino		(substituted in) 46'
MF	9	(Angola)	Buá		(substituted in) 47'
DF	3	(Angola)	Natael		(substituted in) 88'
–
Manager:
(Bosnia and Herzegovina) Dragan Jović

GK	1	(Angola)	Ndulo
RB	8	(Brazil)	Sidney	(yellow card) 66'
CB	10	(Angola)	Sargento
CB	13	(Angola)	Chiwe (c)	(yellow card) 90+4'
LB	6	(Angola)	Zé		(substituted off) 68'
RM	18	(Angola)	Milton
CM	3	(Angola)	Malamba
CM	29	(Angola)	Cagodó	(yellow card) 22'
LM	14	(Angola)	Manico		(substituted off) 80'
FW	17	(Cameroon)	Lionel
FW	21	(Angola)	Tchutchu		(substituted off) 20'
Substitutions:
MF	23	(Nigeria)	Razaq		(substituted in) 20'
MF	11	(Angola)	Nandinho		(substituted in) 68'
FW	19	(Angola)	Mendes		(substituted in) 80'
–
Manager:
(Angola) Mário Soares

Assistant referees:
Bernabé Ngulo
Ricardo Daniel

Fourth official:
Airton Carmelino

Commissioner:
João Gonçalves

== Statistics ==
=== Appearances and goals ===
No.	Pos	Nat	Player	Total		League		Angola Cup		Champions	
No.	Pos	Nat	Player	Apps	Goals	Apps	Goals	Apps	Goals	Apps	Goals
Goalkeepers
12	GK	(Angola) ANG	Tony	29	0	26	0	1	0	2	0
22	GK	(Angola) ANG	Neblú	7	0	4	0	3	0	0	0
29	GK	(Angola) ANG	Nsesani	0	0	0	0	0	0	0	0
Defenders
3	DF	(Angola) ANG	Natael	13	0	5+5	0	2+1	0	0	0
4	DF	(Democratic Republic of the Congo) COD	Bobo	33	3	28	3	3	0	2	0
5	DF	(Angola) ANG	Dani	30	3	25	3	3	0	2	0
6	DF	(Angola) ANG	Bonifácio	4	0	1+1	0	2	0	0	0
7	MF	(Angola) ANG	Mingo Bile	15	0	6+5	0	2	0	0+2	0
15	DF	(Nigeria) NGA	Yisa	8	0	6+1	0	0	0	0+1	0
19	DF	(Angola) ANG	Paizo	29	2	25	2	2+1	0	1	0
21	DF	(Angola) ANG	Isaac	32	0	27+1	0	2	0	2	0
Midfielders
8	MF	(Angola) ANG	Mário	22	0	9+9	0	3	0	0+1	0
9	MF	(Angola) ANG	Buá	32	2	17+10	2	1+3	0	1	0
13	MF	(Democratic Republic of the Congo) COD	Mongo	31	5	24+3	4	2	0	2	1
14	MF	(Angola) ANG	Nelson	19	2	9+8	2	1+1	0	0	0
16	MF	(Angola) ANG	Macaia	29	2	21+4	2	3	0	1	0
18	MF	(Brazil) BRA	Aquino	18	1	3+11	1	1+2	0	0+1	0
20	MF	(Democratic Republic of the Congo) COD	Kila	6	2	6	2	0	0	0	0
23	MF	(Angola) ANG	Show	32	2	28	2	2	0	2	0
30	MF	(Angola) ANG	Ary	30	9	21+4	8	2+2	1	1	0
31	MF	(Angola) ANG	Cirilo	2	0	0+2	0	0	0	0	0
Forwards
17	MF	(Democratic Republic of the Congo) COD	Dago	17	4	7+6	3	3+1	1	0	0
24	DF	(Angola) ANG	Vanilson	4	1	1+3	1	0	0	0	0
26	FW	(Angola) ANG	Mabululu	31	17	22+4	14	3	3	2	0
28	FW	(Angola) ANG	Melono	2	0	0+2	0	0	0	0	0
11	FW	(Angola) ANG	Zito	5	2	2	1	3	1	0	0
Players transferred out during the season
11	MF	(Angola) ANG	Geraldo	4	2	1+1	0	0	0	2	2
17	DF	(Angola) ANG	Guelor	2	0	1	0	0	0	1	0
20	FW	(Democratic Republic of the Congo) COD	Jacques	10	1	4+4	0	0	0	1+1	1
Opponents
5	DF	(Angola) ANG	Jó	0	1	0	1	0	0	0	0

Last updated: 25 May 2019
Source: Competitions

=== Scorers ===
As of 25 May 2019

Rank	Name	League		Cup		Champions		Total	
		Apps	Goals	Apps	Goals	Apps	Goals	Apps	Goals
1	(Angola) Mabululu	22(4)	14	3	3	2	0	27(4)	17
2	(Angola) Ary Papel	21(4)	8	2(2)	1	1	0	24(6)	9
3	(Democratic Republic of the Congo) Mongo	24(3)	4	2	0	2	1	28(3)	5
4	(Democratic Republic of the Congo) Dago	7(6)	3	3(1)	1	0	0	10(7)	4
5	(Angola) Dani	25	3	3	0	2	0	30	3
6	(Democratic Republic of the Congo) Bobo	28	3	3	0	2	0	33	3
7	(Angola) Geraldo	1(1)	0	–		2	2	3(1)	2
8	(Angola) Zito	2	1	3	1	–		5	2
9	(Democratic Republic of the Congo) Kila	6	2	–		–		6	2
10	(Angola) Nelson	9(8)	2	1(1)	0	0	0	10(9)	2
11	(Angola) Buá	17(10)	2	1(3)	0	1	0	19(15)	2
12	(Angola) Macaia	21(4)	2	3	0	1	0	25(4)	2
13	(Angola) Paizo	25	2	2(1)	0	1	0	28(1)	2
14	(Angola) Show	28	2	2	0	2	0	32	2
15	(Angola) Vanilson	1(4)	1	–		0	0	1(4)	1
16	(Brazil) Aquino	3(11)	1	1(2)	0	(1)	0	4(14)	1
17	(Democratic Republic of the Congo) Jacques	4(4)	0	–		1(1)	1	5(5)	1
—	Opponents	–	1			0	0	–	1
Total			51		6		4		61

=== Clean sheets ===
As of 25 May 2019

Rank	Name	League		Cup		Champ		Total		%
		Apps	CS	Apps	CS	Apps	CS	Apps	CS	
1	(Angola) Neblú	4	4	3	2	0	0	7	6	85
2	(Angola) Tony	26	22	1	0	2	0	29	22	75
–	(Angola) Nsesani	0	0	0	0	0	0	0	0	
Total			26		2		0		28	

=== Disciplinary record ===
As of 25 May 2019

No.	Pos	Nat	Name	Girabola			Angola Cup			Champions			Total		
No.	Pos	Nat	Name	Booked	Double yellow card	Sent off (straight red)	Booked	Double yellow card	Sent off (straight red)	Booked	Double yellow card	Sent off (straight red)	Booked	Double yellow card	Sent off (straight red)
4	DF	(Democratic Republic of the Congo)	Bobo	1	0	0	1	0	0	1	0	0	3	0	0
5	DF	(Angola)	Dani	4	0	0	–	–	–	0	0	0	4	0	0
8	MF	(Angola)	Mário	1	0	0	1	0	0	0	0	0	2	0	0
9	MF	(Angola)	Buá	3	0	0	–	–	–	0	0	0	3	0	0
23	MF	(Angola)	Show	8	0	0	1	–	–	2	0	0	11	0	0
12	GK	(Angola)	Tony Cabaça	5	0	0	–	–	–	1	0	0	6	0	0
13	MF	(Angola)	Mongo	4	0	0	–	–	–	1	0	0	5	0	0
14	MF	(Angola)	Nelson	1	0	0	–	–	–	0	0	0	1	0	0
15	DF	(Nigeria)	Yisa	2	0	0	–	–	–	0	0	0	2	0	0
16	MF	(Angola)	Macaia	1	0	0	0	0	0	0	0	0	1	0	0
17	MF	(Democratic Republic of the Congo)	Dago	1	0	0	0	0	0	0	0	0	1	0	0
17	DF	(Angola)	Guelor	0	0	0	–	–	–	1	0	0	1	0	0
19	DF	(Angola)	Paizo	4	0	0	2	0	0	0	0	0	6	0	0
20	FW	(Democratic Republic of the Congo)	Jacques	0	0	0	–	–	–	1	0	0	1	0	0
20	FW	(Democratic Republic of the Congo)	Kila	1	0	0	–	–	–	0	0	0	1	0	0
21	DF	(Angola)	Isaac	4	0	0	1	0	0	1	0	0	6	0	0
22	GK	(Angola)	Neblú	1	0	0	0	0	0	0	0	0	1	0	0
24	MF	(Angola)	Vanilson	1	0	0	–	–	–	0	0	0	1	0	0
26	FW	(Angola)	Mabululu	3	0	0	1	0	0	0	0	0	4	0	0
30	MF	(Angola)	Ary Papel	3	0	0	0	0	0	0	0	0	3	0	0
—	FW	(Angola)	Zito	–	–	–	1	0	0	–	–	–	1	0	0
Totals				48	0	0	8	0	0	7	0	0	63	0	0

=== Season progress ===
30/10	4/11	22/11	28/11	1/12	5/12	9/12	13/12	19/12	29/12	6/1	10/1	16/1	20/1	27/1	3/2	9/2	27/2	3/3	8/3	13/3	17/3	29/3	2/4	7/4	14/4	17/4	20/4	24/4	28/4	8/5	12/5	15/5	19/5	22/5	25/5
INT	DES	ASA	OTO	SRC	OTO	ACA	PRO	LIB	SAU	SCC	CAA	SAG	MAQ	CCU	KAB	PET	INT	DES	ASA	SRC	ACA	PRO	LIB	PET	SAU	SCC	CAA	SAG	MAQ	CCU	CCU	PRO	KAB	PET	DES
Girabola			CH	GB	CH	Girabola																								AC	GB	AC	GB	Angola Cup	

== See also ==
- List of C.D. Primeiro de Agosto players
