= 2019–20 Angola Super Cup =

2019 Angola Super Cup
Desportivo da Huíla	Primeiro de Agosto
Taça Angola	Girabola
1	2
- on aggregate

First leg
Desportivo da Huíla	Primeiro de Agosto
1	0
- Date: 3 August 2019
- Venue: Estádio do Ferrovia, Lubango
- Referee: João Goma

Second leg
Primeiro de Agosto	Desportivo da Huíla
2	0
- Date: 5 August 2019
- Venue: Estádio 11 de Novembro, Luanda
- Referee: António Cachala

The 2019–20 Supertaça de Angola (30th edition) was contested by Primeiro de Agosto, the 2018–19 Girabola champion and Desportivo da Huíla, the 2018–19 Angola Cup winner, in the return of the two leg format. On home court. D'Agosto beat Desportivo 2–0 to secure their 10th title, following a 0-1 defeat in the first leg match in Lubango.

== Match details ==
=== First leg ===
Fri, 2 August 2019
15:30

Desportivo da Huíla	1–0	Primeiro de Agosto
Manico 45+1'	Report

Estádio do Ferrovia, Lubango
Referee: João Goma

Desportivo	D'Agosto

GK	22	(Angola)	Benvindo
RB	8	(Brazil)	Sidney
CB	–	(Ghana)	Seth
CB	13	(Angola)	Chiwe (c)	(yellow card) 78'
LB	21	(Angola)	Yuri		(substituted off) 90+1'
RM	3	(Angola)	Malamba
CM	15	(Angola)	Elias	(yellow card) 27'
CM	28	(Angola)	Nuno
LM	14	(Angola)	Manico		(substituted off) 80'
FW	11	(Cameroon)	Nandinho		(substituted off) 51'
FW	21	(Angola)	Tchutchu		(substituted off) 75'
Substitutions:
MF	18	(Nigeria)	Milton		(substituted in) 51'
MF	3	(Angola)	Malamba		(substituted in) 75'
FW	25	(Angola)	Pedro		(substituted in) 90+1'
–
Manager:
(Angola) Mário Soares

GK	12	(Angola)	Tony	(yellow card) 41'
RB	21	(Angola)	Isaac
CB	4	(Democratic Republic of the Congo)	Bobo
CB	5	(Angola)	Dani (c)
LB	19	(Angola)	Paizo		Substituted off
RM	30	(Angola)	Ary Papel	Booked
CM	10	(Nigeria)	Ibukun
CM	16	(Angola)	Macaia		Substituted off
LM	14	(Angola)	Nelson
FW	11	(Angola)	Zito		Substituted off
FW	27	(Cameroon)	Lionel
Substitutions:
MF	20	(Democratic Republic of the Congo)	Kila		Substituted in
DF	3	(Angola)	Natael		Substituted in
DF	18	(Cameroon)	Atouba	(yellow card) 85'	(substituted in) 52'
–
Manager:
(Bosnia and Herzegovina) Dragan Jović

Assistant referees:
José Felix
Dário Gaspar

Fourth official:
Edson Essoko

Commissioner:
João Gonçalves

=== Second leg ===
Mon, 5 August 2019
18:50

Primeiro de Agosto	2–0	Desportivo da Huíla
Ary Papel 40' (pen.); Lionel 85'	Report

Estádio 11 de Novembro, Luanda
Referee: António Cachala

D'Agosto	Desportivo

GK	12	(Angola)	Tony
RB	21	(Angola)	Isaac
CB	4	(Democratic Republic of the Congo)	Bobo
CB	5	(Angola)	Dani (c)
LB	3	(Angola)	Natael
RM	30	(Angola)	Ary Papel	(yellow card) 40'
CM	10	(Nigeria)	Ibukun	(yellow card) 84'
CM	16	(Angola)	Macaia
LM	20	(Democratic Republic of the Congo)	Kila		(substituted off) 73'
FW	11	(Angola)	Zito		(substituted off) 90'
FW	26	(Angola)	Mabululu		(substituted off) 78'
Substitutions:
MF	9	(Angola)	Buá		(substituted in) 73'
FW	27	(Angola)	Lionel		(substituted in) 78'
MF	13	(Democratic Republic of the Congo)	Mongo		(substituted in) 90'
–
Manager:
(Bosnia and Herzegovina) Dragan Jović

GK	22	(Angola)	Benvindo	(yellow card) 24'
RB	8	(Brazil)	Sidney
CB	5	(Ghana)	Seth	(yellow card) 39'
CB	13	(Angola)	Chiwe (c)
LB	27	(Angola)	Bruno
RM	18	(Angola)	Milton
CM	15	(Angola)	Elias
CM	28	(Angola)	Nuno		(substituted off) 88'
LM	3	(Angola)	Malamba		(substituted off) 78'
FW	14	(Angola)	Manico
FW	16	(Angola)	Yuri		(substituted off) 46'
Substitutions:
MF	25	(Angola)	Pedro		(substituted in) 46'
MF	21	(Angola)	Tchutchu		(substituted in) 78'
FW	11	(Angola)	Nandinho		(substituted in) 88'
–
Manager:
(Angola) Mário Soares

Assistant referees:
Ivanildo Lopes
António Sylia

Fourth official:

Commissioner:

2019 Angola Super Cup winner
Clube Desportivo Primeiro de Agosto
9th title

Squad:
Julião, Neblú, Tony Cabaça (GK)
Bobo, Bonifácio, Dani Massunguna, Isaac, Jó, Natael, Paizo (DF)
Ary Papel, Atouba, Buá, Cirilo, Ibukun, Kila, Macaia, Mário, Mongo, Nelson (MF)
Dago, Lionel, Mabululu, Melono, Vanilson, Zito (FW)
Dragan Jović (Head Coach)

== See also ==
- 2019 Angola Cup
- 2018–19 Girabola
- Primeiro de Agosto players
- Desportivo da Huíla players
