= 2018–19 Angola Cup =

Tournament details
- Country: Angola
- Dates: 10 February – 25 May 2019
- Teams: 23

Final positions
- Champions: 1º de Agosto
- Runners-up: Desp da Huíla

Tournament statistics
- Matches played: 17
- Goals scored: 29 (1.71 per match)
- Top goal scorer: Mabululu (3)
- All statistics correct as of 17 February 2019.

The 2018–19 Taça de Angola was the 37th edition of the Taça de Angola, the second most important and the top knock-out football club competition in Angola following the Girabola. The competition returns after having not been played in 2018 due to the transitional calendar.

The winner qualifies to the 2019–20 CAF Confederation Cup.

== Stadia and locations ==
Locations of the 2018–19 Angola Cup teams

P	Team	Home city	Stadium	Capacity	2017	Current
–	Académica do Lobito	Lobito	Estádio do Buraco	3,000	R16	R16
–	AKC FC	Ondjiva	Estádio dos Castilhos	429	PR	PR
–	ASA	Luanda	Estádio da Cidadela	60,000	R16	R16
–	Benfica do Lubango	Lubango	Estádio do Ferroviário	25,000	DNP	WD
–	Bravos do Maquis	Luena	Estádio Mundunduleno	4,300	SF	QF
–	Semba FC	Cabinda	Estádio do Tafe	25,000	DNP	WD
–	Cuando Cubango FC	Kuito	Estádio dos Eucaliptos	3,300	DNP	R16
–	Desportivo da Huíla	Lubango	Estádio do Ferroviário	25,000	DNP	Runner-Up
–	Domant FC	Caxito	Estádio Municipal do Dande	5,000	R16	R16
–	Ferroviário do Huambo	Huambo	Estádio dos Kurikutelas	10,000	DNP	WD
–	Interclube	Luanda	Estádio 22 de Junho	7,000	QF	SF
–	Kabuscorp	Luanda	Estádio dos Coqueiros	8,000	QF	QF
–	Paulo FC	Caxito	Estádio Municipal do Dande	5,000	R16	DQ
–	Petro de Luanda	Luanda	Estádio 11 de Novembro	50,000	Champion	SF
–	Primeiro de Agosto	Luanda	Estádio 11 de Novembro	50,000	Runner-Up	Champion
–	Primeiro de Maio	Benguela	Estádio Edelfride Costa	6,000	QF	PR
–	Progresso do Sambizanga	Luanda	Estádio dos Coqueiros	8,000	SF	QF
–	Recreativo da Caála	Caála	Estádio Mártires da Canhala	12,000	R16	R16
–	Recreativo do Libolo	Calulo	Estádio Municipal de Calulo	10,000	R16	R16
–	Sagrada Esperança	Dundo	Estádio Sagrada Esperança	8,000	R16	R16
–	Santa Rita de Cássia	Uíge	Estádio 4 de Janeiro	12,000	QF	QF
–	Saurimo FC	Saurimo	Estádio das Mangueiras	7,000	R16	PR
–	Sporting de Cabinda	Cabinda	Estádio do Tafe	25,000	PR	WD
–	Wiliete SC	Benguela	Estádio Edelfride Costa	6,000	DNP	R16

== Preliminary rounds ==
Sat, 16 Feb 2019 PR	ASA	Cancelled	Paulo FC	Luanda
15:00				Stadium: Estádio dos Coqueiros

Sat, 16 Feb 2019 PR	Desportivo da Huíla	Walkover	Benfica do Lubango	Lubango
15:00				Stadium: Estádio do Ferrovia

Sat, 16 Feb 2019 PR	Rec da Caála	Walkover	Semba FC	Caála
15:00				Stadium: Mártires da Canhala

Sat, 16 Feb 2019 PR	Rec do Libolo	Walkover	Sporting Cabinda	Calulo
15:30				Stadium: Municipal de Calulo

Sat, 16 Feb 2019 PR	S^{ta} Rita de Cássia	Walkover	Ferrovia do Huambo	Uíge
15:30				Stadium: Estádio 4 de Janeiro

Sun, 10 Feb 2019 PR	Saurimo FC	0–0 (3–4 p)	Académica Lobito	Saurimo
15:00		Report		Stadium: Estádio das Mangueiras; Referee: Paulo Sérgio; Assistants: Segunda Chisseque, Lídio Coimbra
	Penalties
	Dudú (penalty missed); Chileshe (penalty scored); João (penalty scored); Pino (penalty scored); Anselmo (penalty missed)		(penalty scored) Lito; (penalty scored) Márcio; (penalty scored) Cruz; (penalty scored) Ayala

Sat, 16 Feb 2019 PR	Primeiro de Maio	1–1 (4–5 p)	Cuando Cubango FC	Benguela
15:30	Ning 90+6'		90+4' Jú	Stadium: Estádio Edelfride Costa; Referee: Bernardo Nangolo; Assistants: Pedro Nguelengue, Emiliano Livongue
	Penalties
	Tito (penalty scored); Eliseu (penalty scored); Pick (penalty scored); Andy (penalty missed); Ning (penalty scored); Bruno (penalty missed)		(penalty scored) Lito; (penalty scored) Landrick; (penalty scored) Mahinga; (penalty scored) Luís; (penalty missed) Yoyó; (penalty scored) Xavier

Sun, 17 Feb 2019 PR	Wiliete SC	2–1	AKC FC	Benguela
15:30	Marcos 26'; Etoh 46'		81' Pitra	Stadium: Estádio Edelfride Costa; Referee: Rodrigues Aleixo; Assistants: Nicodemos Calembela, Francisco Paulo

== Round of 16 ==
Tue, 07 May 2019 R16	ASA	0–2	Progresso	Luanda
15:30		Report	68' Celso; 87' Liliano	Stadium: Estádio dos Coqueiros; Referee: António Caxala; Joaquim da Rocha, Aldair Carmelino

Wed, 08 May 2019 R16	Cuando Cubango FC	0–1	1º de Agosto	Kuito
15:00			35' (pen.) Mabululu	Stadium: Campo dos Eucaliptos; Referee: Paulo Talaia; Ricardo Daniel, Joaquim Chiyo

Wed, 08 May 2019 R16	Rec do Libolo	0–2	Petro de Luanda	Calulo
15:00			13' Azulão; 87' Tony	Stadium: Estádio Municipal; Referee: Benjamin Andrade; Judith Mestre, Bernabé Ngulo

Wed, 08 May 2019 R16	S^{ta} Rita de Cássia	Walkover	Domant FC	Uíge
15:00				Stadium: Estádio 4 de Janeiro

Wed, 08 May 2019 R16	Académica Lobito	0–0 (3–4 p)	Bravos do Maquis	Lobito
15:30				Stadium: Estádio do Buraco; Referee: Sabino de Carvalho; Pedro Futa, Ladislau Miguel
	Penalties
	Luvambo (penalty scored); Lito (penalty missed); Edú (penalty scored); Cebola (penalty missed); Gerry (penalty missed)		(penalty scored) Chico; (penalty scored) Chole; (penalty missed) Cabibi; (penalty missed) Madzou; (penalty scored) Miro

Wed, 08 May 2019 R16	Desportivo da Huíla	2–2 (5–4 p)	Sagrada Esperança	Lubango
15:30	Lionel 6'; Maludi 8'		22' Guedes; 51' Jiresse	Stadium: Estádio do Ferrovia; Referee: Rodrigues Aleixo; Nicodemos Calembela, Francisco Van-Dúnem
	Penalties
	Lionel (penalty scored); Elias (penalty scored); Sargento (penalty missed); Milton (penalty missed); Sidney (penalty scored); Emilson (penalty missed); Cagodó (penalty scored); Malamba (penalty scored)		(penalty scored) Jiresse; (penalty missed) Mussa; (penalty scored) Gaspar; (penalty scored) Higino; (penalty missed) L.Tati; (penalty missed) ? (penalty scored) Almeida; (penalty missed) Adó Pena

Wed, 08 May 2019 R16	Rec da Caála	0–1	Interclube	Caála
15:36		Report	5' Dasfaa	Stadium: Mártires da Canhala; Referee: Ailton Carmelino; Evanildo Martins, Evandro Rocha

Wed, 08 May 2019 R16	Wiliete SC	2–3	Kabuscorp	Benguela
16:00	Kalú 82'; J.Vala 90+1'		5' Meda; 78' Amaro; 86' (o.g.) Gervinho	Stadium: Estádio de Ombaka; Referee: José Álvaro; Estanislau Guedes, Rosário Calembela

== Quarter-finals ==
Wed, 15 May 2019 QF	Progresso	1–2	1º de Agosto	Luanda
15:00	Chiló 2'	Report	20', 85' Mabululu	Stadium: Estádio dos Coqueiros; Referee: Paulo Talaia; Judith Mestre, Ricardo Daniel

Wed, 15 May 2019 QF	Santa Rita	0–0 (3–4 p)	Interclube	Uíge
15:00		Report		Stadium: 4 de Janeiro; Referee: António Cachala; Evandro Rocha, Luís Mateus

Wed, 15 May 2019 QF	Petro de Luanda	1–0	Bravos do Maquis	Luanda
15:00	Azulão 39'	Report		Stadium: 11 de Novembro; Referee: Bernardo Nangolo; Pedro Alberto, António Livongue

Wed, 15 May 2019 QF	Desportivo Huíla	0–0 (5–4 p)	Kabuscorp	Lubango
15:00		Report		Stadium: Estádio do Ferrovia; Referee: Horácio Tchissingui; Alexandre Bengue, Gilberto Kativa

== Semifinals ==
Wed, 22 May 2019 SF	Desportivo Huíla	1–0	Interclube	Lubango
15:00	Manucho 70'	Report		Stadium: Estádio do Ferrovia; Referee: António Cachala; Wilson Ntyamba, Judith Mestre

Wed, 22 May 2019 SF	1º de Agosto	1–0	Petro de Luanda	Luanda
16:00	Dago 72'	Report		Stadium: 11 de Novembro; Referee: Hélder Martins; Evanildo Martins, Ivanildo Lopes

== Final ==
Sat, 25 May 2019
15:38

Primeiro de Agosto	2–1	Desportivo da Huíla
Zito 59'; Papel 63' (pen.)	Report	45+1' Lionel

11 de Novembro, Luanda
Attendance: 5,000
Referee: Benjamin Andrade

D'Agosto	Desportivo

GK	12	(Angola)	Tony
RB	21	(Angola)	Isaac	(yellow card) 90+2'
CB	4	(Democratic Republic of the Congo)	Bobo	(yellow card) 53'
CB	5	(Angola)	Dani (c)
LB	19	(Angola)	Paizo	(yellow card) 83'
RM	17	(Democratic Republic of the Congo)	Dago
CM	8	(Angola)	Mário		(substituted off) 47'
CM	16	(Angola)	Macaia
LM	13	(Democratic Republic of the Congo)	Mongo		(substituted off) 46'
FW	11	(Angola)	Zito		(substituted off) 88'
FW	30	(Angola)	Ary Papel
Substitutions:
MF	18	(Brazil)	Aquino		(substituted on) 46'
MF	9	(Angola)	Buá		(substituted on) 47'
DF	3	(Angola)	Natael		(substituted on) 88'
–
Manager:
(Bosnia and Herzegovina) Dragan Jović

GK	1	(Angola)	Ndulo
RB	8	(Brazil)	Sidney	(yellow card) 66'
CB	10	(Angola)	Sargento
CB	13	(Angola)	Chiwe (c)	(yellow card) 90+4'
LB	6	(Angola)	Zé		(substituted off) 68'
RM	18	(Angola)	Milton
CM	3	(Angola)	Malamba
CM	29	(Angola)	Cagodó	(yellow card) 22'
LM	14	(Angola)	Manico		(substituted off) 80'
FW	17	(Cameroon)	Lionel
FW	21	(Angola)	Tchutchu		(substituted off) 20'
Substitutions:
MF	23	(Nigeria)	Razaq		(substituted on) 20'
MF	11	(Angola)	Nandinho		(substituted on) 68'
FW	19	(Angola)	Mendes		(substituted on) 80'
Manager:
(Angola) Mário Soares

Assistant referees:
Bernabé Ngulo
Ricardo Daniel

Fourth official:
Airton Carmelino

Commissioner:
João Gonçalves

== Goalscorers ==
As of 25 May 2019

Team eliminated / inactive for this round.

Rank	Player	Team	PR	R16	QF	SF	F	Total
1	(Angola) Mabululu	1º de Agosto		1	2			3
2	(Brazil) Azulão	Petro de Luanda		1	1			2
2	(Cameroon) Lionel	Desportivo da Huíla		1			1	2
3	(Angola) Guedes	Sagrada Esperança		1				1
3	(Democratic Republic of the Congo) Jiresse	Sagrada Esperança		1				1
3	(Angola) Ning	Primeiro de Maio	1					1
3	(Angola) Pitra	A.K.C.	1					1
4	(Angola) Amaro	Kabuscorp		1				1
4	(Angola) Celso	Progresso		1				1
4	(Angola) Chiló	Progresso			1			1
4	(Angola) Etoh	Wiliete	1					1
4	(Angola) Gervinho (Note: Own goal)	Kabuscorp		1				1
4	(Angola) João Vala	Wiliete		1				1
4	(Angola) Jú	Cuando Cubango FC	1					1
4	(Angola) Kalú	Wiliete		1				1
4	(Angola) Liliano	Progresso		1				1
4	(Angola) Meda	Kabuscorp		1				1
4	(Angola) Marcos	Wiliete	1					1
5	(Angola) Dasfaa	Interclube		1				1
5	(Angola) Manucho	Desportivo da Huíla				1		1
5	(Brazil) Tony	Petro de Luanda		1				1
5	(Angola) Zito	1º de Agosto					1	1
6	(Angola) Ary Papel	1º de Agosto					1	1
6	(Democratic Republic of the Congo) Dago	1º de Agosto				1		1
6	(Angola) Maludi	Desportivo da Huíla		1				1
–	Total		5	15	4	2	3	29

== See also ==
- 2018–19 Girabola
- 2019–20 Angola Super Cup
- 2019–20 CAF Confederation Cup
