= Cuíma =

Cuima
- Commune and town
- Location in Angola
- Coordinates: 13°14′40″S 15°38′29″E
- Country: Angola
- Province: Huambo
- Municipality: Caála
- Time zone: UTC+1 (WAT)
- Climate: Cwb

Cuima is a town and commune in the municipality of Caála, province of Huambo, Angola.

== Transport ==
It is the terminus of a branch railway that junctions of the Benguela Railway near Pais.

== See also ==
- Railway stations in Angola
