= Emmanuel Ngudikama =

Congolese footballer

Personal information
- Full name: Emmanuel Ngudikama Mingiedi
- Date of birth: 7 September 1987 (age 39)
- Position: Midfielder

Senior career*
| Years | Team | Apps | (Gls) |
| 2009 | FC Les Stars | | |
| 2010–2019 | AS Vita Club | | |
| 2019–2020 | Primeiro de Agosto | | |

International career^{‡}
| 2010–2016 | Congo | 5 | (0) |
- * Club domestic league appearances and goals as of 1 August 2020 ‡ National team caps and goals as of 1 August 2020

Emmanuel Ngudikama (born 7 September 1987) is a Congolese football midfielder.
