= Anderson Aquino =

Brazilian footballer (born 1986)

Personal information
- Full name: Anderson Angus Aquino
- Date of birth: February 18, 1986 (age 40)
- Place of birth: Foz do Iguaçu, Brazil
- Height: 1.74 m (5 ft 9 in)
- Position: Striker

Youth career
- 2003–2004: Paraná

Senior career*
Years	Team	Apps	(Gls)
2005–2010	Atlético Paranaense	16	(1)
2006–2007	→ Sport (loan)	50	(6)
2008	→ Goiás (loan)	4	(1)
2009	→ Ituano (loan)	8	(0)
2009–2010	→ FC Olimpi Rustavi (loan)	31	(26)
2010	→ Paraná (loan)	11	(6)
2011–2015	Coritiba	66	(26)
2015	→ Santa Cruz (loan)	25	(10)
2016	Linense	10	(4)
2016	Botafogo	6	(0)
2017	Figueirense	0	(0)
2017	Londrina	1	(0)
2017–	Figueirense	0	(0)
2019	1º de Agosto		
- * Club domestic league appearances and goals as of 17 December 2017

Anderson Angus Aquino (born 18 February 1986), known as Anderson Aquino , is a Brazilian footballer who plays as a striker.

In 2018–19, he signed in for Primeiro de Agosto in Angola's premier league, the Girabola.

== Career statistics ==
Club performance			League		Cup		Continental		Total	
Season	Club	League	Apps	Goals	Apps	Goals	Apps	Goals	Apps	Goals
Georgia			League		Georgian Cup		Europe		Total	
2009-10	Olimpi Rustavi	Umaglesi liga	31	26	1	0	2	0	34	26
Total	Georgia		31	26	1	0	2	0	34	26
Career total			31	26	1	0	2	0	34	26

== Honours ==
Atlético Paranaense

- Dallas Cup: 2005
- Parana State Superleague: 2002

Sport

- Campeonato Pernambucano: 2006, 2007
- Campeonato Brasileiro Série B: 2006

FC Olimpi Rustavi

- Umaglesi Liga: 2009-10

Coritiba

- Campeonato Paranaense: 2011, 2012
