= Mabululu =

Angolan footballer (born 1992)

Personal information
- Full name: Agostinho Cristóvão Paciência
- Date of birth: 1 June 1992 (age 34)
- Place of birth: Luanda, Angola
- Height: 1.78 m (5 ft 10 in)
- Position: Striker

Team information
- Current team: Wiliete
- Number: 9

Senior career*
Years	Team	Apps	(Gls)
2006–2007	Santos		
2008–2009	Kabuscorp		
2010	Progresso		
2012–2013	Petro de Luanda	12	(3)
2013	Rec do Libolo	5	(0)
2014–2015	Petro de Luanda	21	(4)
2016	Interclube	12	(2)
2017	ASA	10	(1)
2018	Domant FC	20	(9)
2019–2021	1º de Agosto	73	(37)
2021–2024	Al Ittihad Alexandria	81	(40)
2024–2026	Al Ahli Tripoli	31	(20)
2026	Al Ittihad Alexandria	14	(0)
2026-	Wiliete	6	(8)

International career^{‡}
2013–	Angola	50	(16)
- * Club domestic league appearances and goals ‡ National team caps and goals as of 6 October 2026

Agostinho Cristóvão Paciência (born 1 June 1992), commonly known as Mabululu, is an Angolan professional footballer who plays as a striker. He played at the 2014 FIFA World Cup qualification.

In 2018–19, he signed in for Primeiro de Agosto in Angola's premier league, the Girabola.

== International career ==
In 2024, Mabululu was called up for his second AFCON (after 2019, when he was a substitute and Angola was eliminated in the group stage) he scored 3 goals in 5 Matches, helping Angola reach the quarterfinals, and his goal against Namibia (in a 3–0 round-of 16 win) was voted the best African goal of 2024.

Style Of Play

He is right footed and plays as a striker.

== Club career statistics ==
Appearances and goals by club, season and competition
Club	Season	League			Cup		Continental		Other		Total	
Club	Season	Division	Apps	Goals	Apps	Goals	Apps	Goals	Apps	Goals	Apps	Goals
Atlético Petróleos de Luanda	2012	Girabola	7	0	0	0	0	0	—		7	0
Atlético Petróleos de Luanda	2013	Girabola	5	3	0	0	0	0	—		5	3
Atlético Petróleos de Luanda	2014	Girabola	6	0	0	0	0	0	—		6	0
Atlético Petróleos de Luanda	2015	Girabola	15	4	1	0	1	2	—		17	6
Atlético Petróleos de Luanda	Total		33	7	1	0	1	2	0	0	35	9
C.R.D. Libolo	2013	Girabola	5	0	0	0	0	0	—		5	0
Interclube	2016	Girabola	12	2	0	0	0	0	—		12	2
ASA	2017	Girabola	10	1	0	0	0	0	—		10	1
Domant	2018	Girabola	20	9	0	0	0	0	—		20	9
Primeiro de Agosto	2018–19	Girabola	26	14	3	3	2	0	—		31	17
Primeiro de Agosto	2019–20	Girabola	23	12	2	1	10	6	1	0	36	19
Primeiro de Agosto	2020–21	Girabola	23	9	2	1	2	1	—		27	10
Primeiro de Agosto	Total		72	35	7	5	14	7	1	0	94	47
Al Ittihad	2021–22	EPL	24	13	1	1	—		—		25	14
Al Ittihad	2022–23	EPL	32	16	1	0	—		—		33	16
Al Ittihad	2023–24	EPL	25	11	0	0	—		—		25	11
Al Ittihad	2025-26	EPL	14	0			1	1			15	1
Al Ittihad	Total		95	40	2	1	1	1	0	0	98	42
Al Ahli	2024–25	LPL	19	17	0	0	1	1	—		20	18
Wiliete	2026-27	Girabola	6	8			4	4			10	12
Career total			272	119	10	6	21	15	1	0	304	140

== International career ==
=== International goals ===
Scores and results list Angola's goal tally first.

No	Date	Venue	Opponent	Score	Result	Competition
1.	14 July 2013	Nkana Stadium, Kitwe, Zambia	Lesotho	1–0	1–1 (3–5 p)	2013 COSAFA Cup
2.	16 July 2013	Arthur Davies Stadium, Kitwe, Zambia	Malawi	1–1	3–2	2013 COSAFA Cup
3.	16 July 2013	Arthur Davies Stadium, Kitwe, Zambia	Malawi	2–2	3–2	2013 COSAFA Cup
4.	7 September 2013	Estádio Nacional da Tundavala, Lubango, Angola	Liberia	2–0	4–1	2014 FIFA World Cup qualification
5.	8 June 2019	Estádio Municipal 25 de Abril, Penafiel, Portugal	Guinea-Bissau	2–0	2–0	Friendly
6.	17 November 2022	Dobsonville Stadium, Johannesburg, South Africa	Botswana	1–0	1–0	Friendly
7.	10 January 2024	Police Officers' Club Stadium, Dubai, United Arab Emirates	Bahrain	2–0	3–0	Friendly
8.	15 January 2024	Stade de la Paix, Bouaké, Ivory Coast	Algeria	1–1	1–1	2023 Africa Cup of Nations
9.	23 January 2024	Charles Konan Banny Stadium, Yamoussoukro, Ivory Coast	Burkina Faso	1–0	2–0	2023 Africa Cup of Nations
10.	27 January 2024	Stade de la Paix, Bouaké, Ivory Coast	Namibia	3–0	3–0	2023 Africa Cup of Nations
11.	7 June 2024	Estádio 11 de Novembro, Talatona, Angola	Eswatini	1–0	1–0	2026 FIFA World Cup qualification
12.	9 September 2024	Estádio 11 de Novembro, Talatona, Angola	Sudan	1–0	2–1	2025 Africa Cup of Nations qualification
13.	11 October 2024	Estádio 11 de Novembro, Talatona, Angola	Niger	1–0	2–0	2025 Africa Cup of Nations qualification
14.	18 November 2025	Estádio 11 de Novembro, Talatona, Angola	Zambia	3–2	3–2	Friendly
15.	9 June 2026	Larbi Zaouli Stadium, Casablanca, Morocco	Central African Republic	2–0	3–0	Friendly
16.	6 October 2026	Estádio 11 de Novembro, Talatona, Angola	Malawi	2–0	3–1	2027 Africa Cup of Nations qualification

== Honours ==
Individual

- Girabola top scorers: 2019
- 2022–23 Egyptian Premier League Top Scorer: 16 Goals
- 2022–23 Egyptian Premier League Team of the Season
- Best African goal 2024
- Top scorer 2024-25 Libyan Premier League: 18 goals
