= Yazid Atouba =

Cameroonian footballer

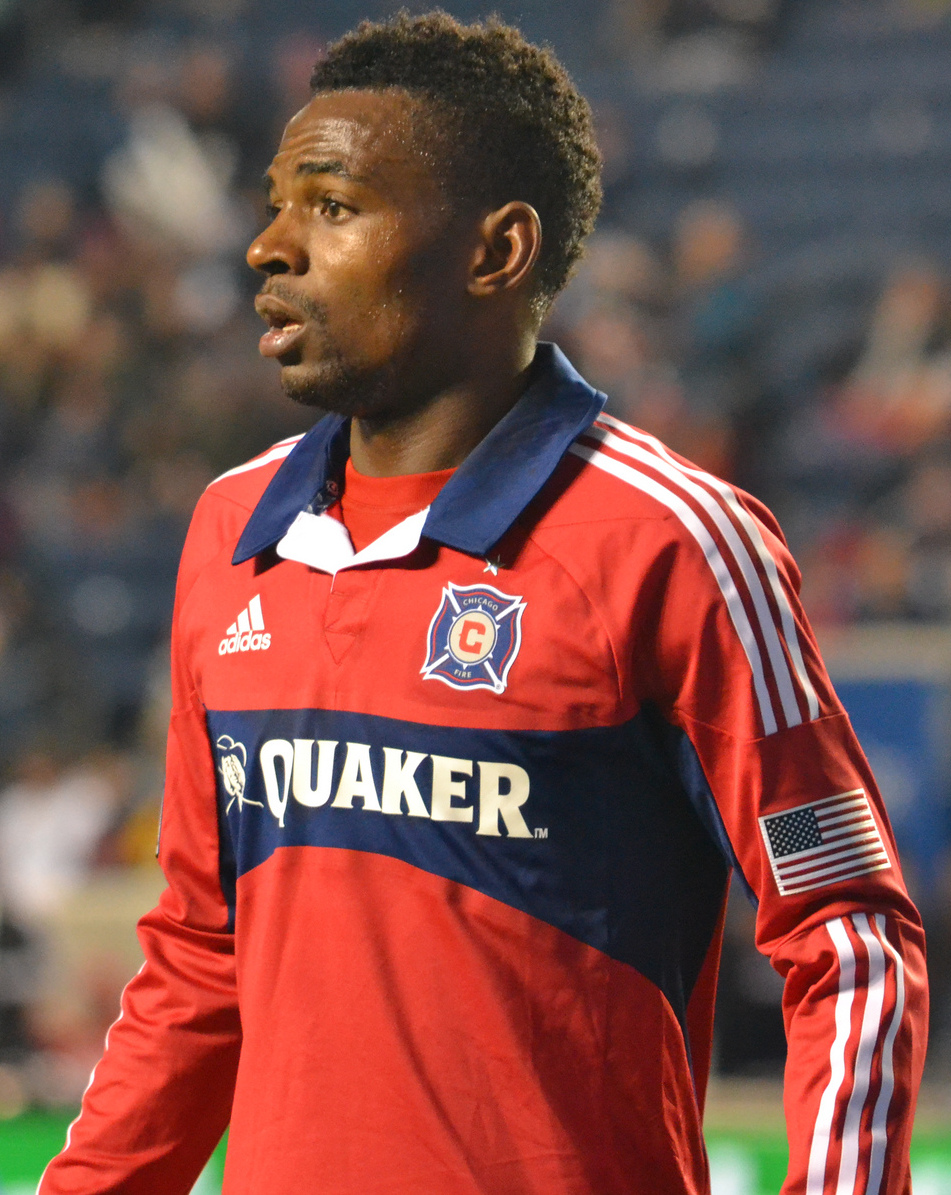
- Yazid Atouba playing for Chicago Fire

Personal information
- Full name: Yazid Atouba Emane
- Date of birth: 2 January 1993 (age 33)
- Place of birth: Yaoundé, Cameroon
- Height: 1.68 m (5 ft 6 in)
- Position: Midfielder

Youth career
- 2010–2012: Renaissance
- 2012–2013: Canon Yaoundé

Senior career*
| Years | Team | Apps | (Gls) |
| 2013–2014 | Chicago Fire | 3 | (0) |
| 2015–2016 | Coton Sport | | |
| 2016–2017 | AS Vita Club | | |
| 2017–2019 | Maritzburg United | 19 | (0) |
| 2020–2021 | 1º de Agosto | 26 | (3) |

International career^{‡}
| 2011 | Cameroon U20 | 4 | (0) |
| 2016 | Cameroon | 6 | (2) |
- * Club domestic league appearances and goals as of 8 July 2023 ‡ National team caps and goals as of 8 July 2023

Yazid Atouba (French pronunciation: [jazi atuba]; born 2 January 1993) is a Cameroonian footballer who plays as a midfielder, lastly for Angolan football club Primeiro de Agosto.

== Career ==
=== Club ===
After spending his early career in his native land of Cameroon, Atouba was drafted by the Chicago Fire of Major League Soccer on 17 January 2013 as the 30th overall pick in the 2013 MLS SuperDraft. Then after impressing coaches in Chicago's pre-season camps, Atouba was officially signed by the team on 1 March 2013. Then, just two days after signing his first professional contract, Atouba made his MLS debut in the Fire's first match of the season against the defending champions Los Angeles Galaxy at the Home Depot Center in Carson, California when he came on in the 70th minute for Joel Lindpere; however the Fire came out in the end with a 4–0 loss.

He was waived by the Fire in March 2014. On 31 January 2015, Atouba signed with Elite One champions Coton Sport. He remained there until July 2016 when he departed to join Linafoot side AS Vita Club in the DR Congo.

On 26 February 2019, Atouba was released by Maritzburg United.

In 2019–20, he signed in for Primeiro de Agosto in the Angolan league, the Girabola.

=== International ===
Atouba has represented Cameroon at U20 and senior level. He won four caps for the U20s while he has currently won five caps and scored two goals for the seniors, both goals and all but one appearance came during the 2016 African Nations Championship in Rwanda.

== Career statistics ==
=== Club ===
As of 11 October 2015

| Club | Season | League | | Cup | | Continental (Note: Includes the CAF Champions League) | | Total | |
| Club | Season | Apps | Goals | Apps | Goals | Apps | Goals | Apps | Goals |
|---|---|---|---|---|---|---|---|---|---|
| Chicago Fire | 2013 | 3 | 0 | 0 | 0 | — | | 3 | 0 |
| Chicago Fire | Total | 3 | 0 | 0 | 0 | — | | 3 | 0 |
| Coton Sport | 2015 | 0 | 0 | 0 | 0 | 1 | 0 | 1 | 0 |
| Coton Sport | Total | 0 | 0 | 0 | 0 | 1 | 0 | 1 | 0 |
| Career total | | 3 | 0 | 0 | 0 | 1 | 0 | 4 | 0 |

=== International ===
As of 21 January 2017.

| National team | Year | Apps | Goals | |
|---|---|---|---|---|
Cameroon
| Cameroon | 2016 | 5 | 2 | |
| Cameroon | Total | | 5 | 2 |

=== International goals ===
As of 21 January 2017. Scores and results list Cameroon's goal tally first.

| Goal | Date | Venue | Opponent | Score | Result | Competition |
|---|---|---|---|---|---|---|
| 1 | 17 January 2016 | Stade Huye, Butare, Rwanda | Angola | 1–0 | 1–0 | 2016 African Nations Championship |
| 2 | 25 January 2016 | Stade Huye, Butare, Rwanda | DR Congo | 1–0 | 3–1 | 2016 African Nations Championship |
