= Estádio Mártires da Canhala =

Football stadium in Caála, Angola

Coordinates: 12.846323°S 15.559387°E

- Interactive map of Estádio Mártires da Canhala
- Location: Caála, Huambo, Angola
- Owner: Recreativo da Caála
- Capacity: 11,000

Construction
- Renovated: October 6, 2013; 12 years ago

Tenant
- Recreativo da Caála

Estádio Mártires da Canhala is a football stadium in Caála, Huambo, Angola. It is owned by C.R. Caála.

The stadium underwent a major rehabilitation in 2012. and has an 11,000-seat capacity.
