= Zé Ventura =

Angolan footballer

Personal information
- Full name: Osvaldo Paulo Ventura
- Date of birth: 3 August 1996 (age 30)
- Place of birth: Maianga, Angola
- Height: 1.66 m (5 ft 5 in)
- Position: Midfielder

Team information
- Current team: Desportivo da Huíla

Youth career
- –2016: Primeiro de Agosto

Senior career*
Years	Team	Apps	(Gls)
2017–2018	1º de Agosto	0	(0)
2017–2018	→ Desportivo Huíla (loan)	26	(0)
2019–	Desportivo Huíla	6	(0)

International career^{‡}
2018–	Angola	2	(0)
- * Club domestic league appearances and goals as of 11:44, 9 July 2019 (UTC) ‡ National team caps and goals as of 11:44, 9 July 2019 (UTC)

Osvaldo Paulo Ventura (born 3 August 1996), commonly known as Zé Ventura, is an Angolan footballer who currently plays as a midfielder for Desportivo Huíla.

== Career statistics ==
=== Club ===
As of 9 July 2019.

Club	Season	League			Cup		Continental		Other		Total	
Club	Season	Division	Apps	Goals	Apps	Goals	Apps	Goals	Apps	Goals	Apps	Goals
1º de Agosto	2017	Girabola	0	0	0	0	–		0	0	0	0
1º de Agosto	2018	Girabola	0	0	0	0	–		0	0	0	0
1º de Agosto	Total		0	0	0	0	0	0	0	0	0	0
Desportivo Huíla (loan)	2017	Girabola	11	0	0	0	–		0	0	11	0
Desportivo Huíla (loan)	2018	Girabola	15	0	0	0	–		0	0	15	0
Desportivo Huíla	2018–19	Girabola	6	0	3 (Note: Appearances in the Taça de Angola)	0	–		0	0	9	0
Career total			32	0	3	0	0	0	0	0	35	0

=== International ===
As of matches played 23 September 2018.

National team	Year	Apps	Goals
Angola	2018	2	0
Total		2	0
