= Seth Owusu =

Ghanaian footballer (born 1990)

Personal information
- Full name: Seth Owusu
- Date of birth: September 20, 1990 (age 36)
- Place of birth: Accra, Ghana
- Height: 1.89 m (6 ft 2 in)
- Position: Defender

Senior career*
Years	Team	Apps	(Gls)
2007–2008	FC Medeama	21	(1)
2008–2009	Tarkwa Real United	20	
2009–2010	Kessben	17	(2)
2011–2012	Medeama SC	19	
2011	→ Chivas USA (loan)	10	
2012–2013	Hearts of Oak	22	(3)
2013–2014	Golden Arrows	4	
2015–2017	Sagrada Esperança	26	(5)

International career
	Ghana U-17	6	
	Ghana U-20	13	
- * Club domestic league appearances and goals as of May 3, 2013

Seth Owusu (born September 20, 1990, in Accra) is a Ghanaian footballer who last played for Sagrada Esperança in Angola. He previously played in the Ghana Premier League and for Chivas USA in Major League Soccer.

== Career ==
=== Club ===
Owusu began his career in the Ghanaian Second Division with FC Medeama, before signing with First Division club Tarkwa Real United in 2008. In 2009, he moved to Kessben where he played in the Glo Premier League. Kessben's playing license was bought by Tarkwa-based Medeama SC in December 2010, and Owusu's rights were transferred to the new club.

Following an unsuccessful trial with Polish side Legia Warszawa, Owusu moved to the United States in 2011, signing a one-year contract with Chivas USA of Major League Soccer. He made his debut for Chivas on March 29, 2011, in a Lamar Hunt US Open Cup game against the Portland Timbers.

Owusu was released by Chivas USA in late June 2011 due to injury. He was expected back by Chivas but Medeama SC did not release him .

=== International ===
Owusu has experience of various youth national teams in Ghana, having played for the BlackStars at U-17 and U-21 level, and being a member of several camps with the full national team. He was named in a Ghana squad picked for a 2012 Africa Cup of Nations qualifier against Sudan at home in October 2010.

== See also ==
- List of current MLS players
