= Dragan Jović =

Bosnian football manager (born 1963)

Personal information
- Date of birth: 19 July 1963 (age 63)
- Place of birth: Travnik, SFR Yugoslavia

Managerial career
- Years: Team
- 2005–2006: Travnik
- 2006–2007: Posušje
- 2007–2010: Zrinjski Mostar
- 2010–2012: Zvijezda Gradačac
- 2012–2013: Sarajevo
- 2013–2014: Borac Banja Luka
- 2014–2017: Primeiro de Agosto
- 2018–2020: Primeiro de Agosto
- 2021: Ismaily
- 2022: Tuzla City

Dragan Jović (born 19 July 1963) is a Bosnian professional football manager. He is regarded as one of the most successful Bosnian football managers.

== Managerial career ==
=== Early career ===
In his early career, Jović managed Travnik and Posušje. He replaced Blaž Slišković as manager of Zrinjski Mostar in late 2007, and led the team to win the Bosnian Cup in 2008 and the Bosnian Premier League in 2009.

After leaving Zrinjski, Jović became the new manager of Zvijezda Gradačac. Later on, he also managed Sarajevo and Borac Banja Luka.

=== Primeiro de Agosto ===
Jović went on to manage Angolan Girabola club Primeiro de Agosto, from 2014 until he left the club for health reasons in December 2017. During his tenure in the club, Jović won two Angolan league titles and one Super Cup.

=== Return to Primeiro de Agosto ===
In November 2018, Jović returned as the manager of Primeiro de Agosto. He had success with the club again, winning the 2018–19 Angola Cup after beating Huíla in the final on 25 May 2019. Jović also won the league title in the 2018–19 season and the 2019 Angola Super Cup.

=== Ismaily ===
Jović briefly managed Egyptian Premier League club Ismaily from January to March 2021.

=== Tuzla City ===
On 13 May 2022, Tuzla City signed Jović to a three-year contract for the start of the 2022–23 season, marking his return to the Bosnian Premier League after eight years. On 7 July 2022, he managed his first match with Tuzla City in a 2–0 away win against Tre Penne in the first qualifying round of the UEFA Europa Conference League. On 21 July, Jović had his first defeat as Tuzla City's manager as AZ Alkmaar was victorious in the second qualifying round of the UEFA Europa Conference League.

On 10 August 2022, he led Tuzla City to a 5–1 away win over Sarajevo, the latter's biggest ever Bosnian Premier League defeat in history.

Jović terminated his contract with Tuzla City by mutual consent in November 2022, following some weeks of him having health problems.

== Managerial statistics ==
As of 19 November 2022

Managerial record by team and tenure
Team	From	To	Record							
Team	From	To	G	W	D	L	GF	GA	GD	Win %
Travnik	1 July 2005	30 June 2006	31	10	4	17	33	45	−12	32.26
Posušje	4 September 2006	7 October 2007	39	15	7	17	50	61	−11	38.46
Zrinjski Mostar	11 October 2007	12 September 2010	69	38	10	21	119	83	+36	55.07
Zvijezda Gradačac	24 November 2010	5 January 2012	30	11	9	10	43	40	+3	36.67
Sarajevo	6 January 2012	17 March 2013	42	23	9	10	70	43	+27	54.76
Borac Banja Luka	25 June 2013	18 March 2014	25	12	6	7	31	25	+6	48.00
Primeiro de Agosto	19 March 2014	31 December 2017	119	73	27	19	204	87	+117	61.34
Primeiro de Agosto	26 November 2018	8 June 2020	62	38	16	8	102	35	+67	61.29
Ismaily	29 January 2021	18 March 2021	9	1	4	4	6	11	−5	11.11
Tuzla City	1 June 2022	28 November 2022	20	9	2	9	39	29	+10	45.00
Total			446	230	94	122	697	459	+238	51.57

== Honours ==
Zrinjski Mostar

- Bosnian Premier League: 2008–09
- Bosnian Cup: 2007–08

Primeiro de Agosto

- Girabola: 2016, 2017, 2018–19
- Taça de Angola: 2018–19
- Supertaça de Angola: 2017, 2019
