= Bobo Ungenda =

Congolese footballer (born 1989)

Personal information
- Full name: Bodrick Ungenda Muselenge
- Date of birth: 19 November 1989 (age 36)
- Place of birth: Kasa-Vubu, Kinshasa, Zaire
- Height: 1.87 m (6 ft 2 in)
- Position: Defender

Team information
- Current team: Primeiro de Agosto

Senior career*
Years	Team	Apps	(Gls)
20??–2015	DC Motema Pembe		
2015–2016	Kabuscorp	35	(1)
2017–2026	Primeiro de Agosto	283	(25)

International career^{‡}
2012–2020	DR Congo	12	(0)
- * Club domestic league appearances and goals ‡ National team caps and goals as of 18:14, 17 June 2019 (UTC)

Bodrick Ungenda Muselenge (born 19 November 1989), commonly known as Bobo Ungenda, is a Congolese assistant coach for Angolan club Primeiro de Agosto.

== Club career ==
Ungenda was born in 1989 in Kasa-Vubu, Kinshasa, and played football for the Kinshasa-based clubs AC Tonnerre and FC Les Stars before joining DC Motema Pembe. He went on to captain the team, but in 2015 the club declared all its players available for transfer, and Ungenda left in what was initially described as a six-month loan to Angolan Girabola club Kabuscorp.

Ungenda moved on to Primeiro de Agosto ahead of the 2017 Girabola season, at the end of which he was named Best Foreign Player in the Girabola, and narrowly missed out on the main Player of the Year award to his team-mate, Geraldo. He helped them win three consecutive league titles, and represented them in the CAF Champions League. In the 2018 edition, Ungenda scored a 98th-minute winner against ZESCO United that proved instrumental in their qualifying from the group stage, and helped them reach the semi-final in which he had a second-leg away goal disallowed that would have left Espérance de Tunis needing to score five. Espérance won the tie 4–3 on aggregate and went on to win the competition.

== International career ==
Ungenda represented his country at under-age levels before receiving his first call-up to the DR Congo senior squad for a 2014 World Cup qualifier against Cameroon in June 2012. A shock inclusion in the starting eleven for a match played in an "atmosphere of hostility", Ungenda had time to receive a yellow card before being substituted after just 15 minutes. Cameroon won 1–0. He played in all four of DR Congo's matches at the 2014 African Nations Championship, and captained his country at the 2016 COSAFA Cup, at which DR Congo lost to Swaziland in the bronze-medal match. Ungenda was named in DR Congo's 23-man squad for the 2019 Africa Cup of Nations.

== Titles ==
Primeiro de Angola

- Angola Cup (1): 2019
