= Ary Papel =

Angolan footballer

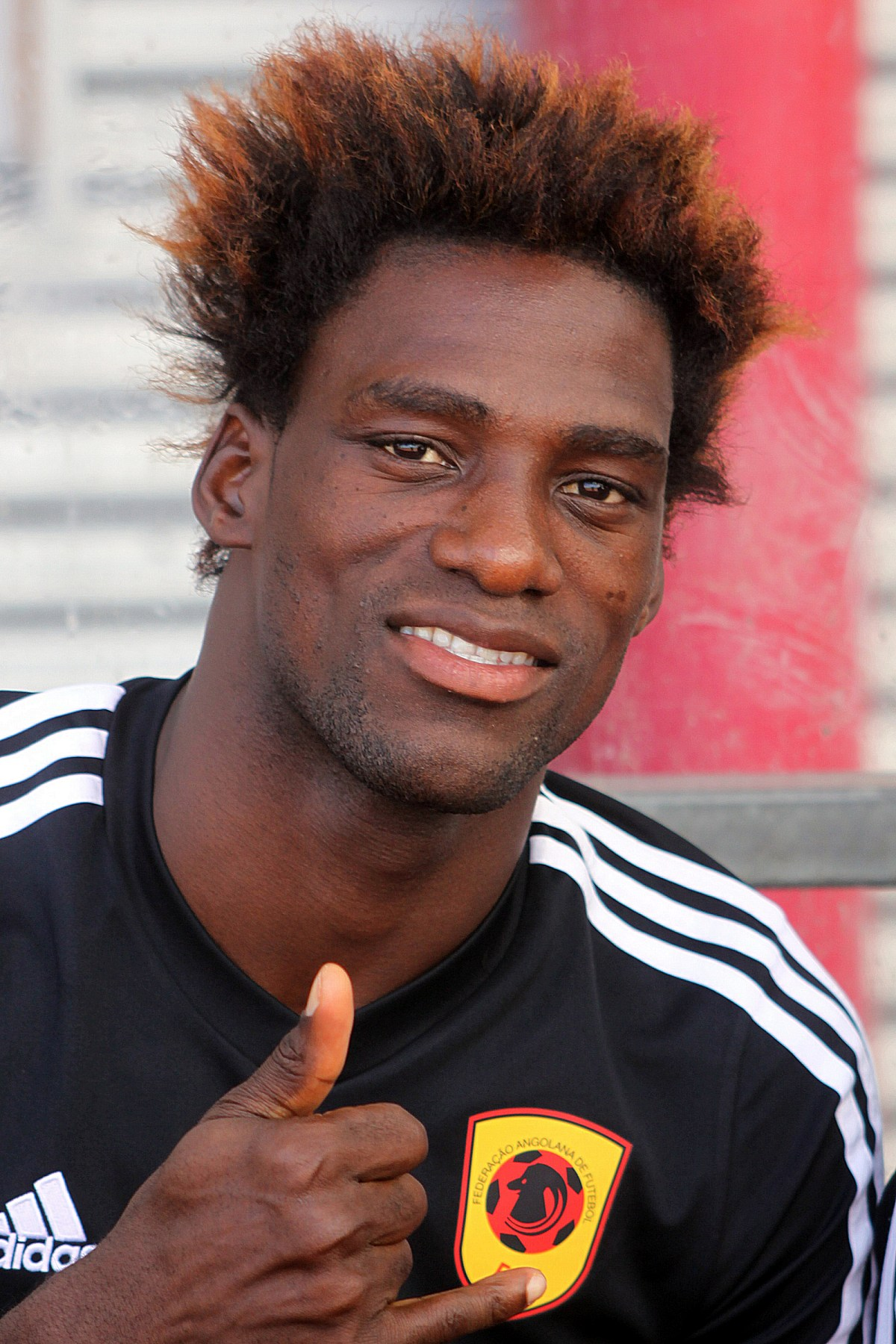
- Ary Papel in 2014

Personal information
- Full name: Manuel David Afonso
- Date of birth: 3 March 1994 (age 32)
- Place of birth: Cabinda, Angola
- Height: 1.88 m (6 ft 2 in)
- Position: Winger

Team information
- Current team: Al Akhdar
- Number: 30

Senior career*
Years	Team	Apps	(Gls)
2012–2016	1º de Agosto	85	(36)
2017–2018	Sporting CP B	31	(0)
2017	→ Moreirense (loan)	1	(0)
2019	→ 1º de Agosto (loan)	23	(7)
2019–2020	1º de Agosto	15	(11)
2020	Al Taawoun	0	(0)
2020–2021	Ismaily	22	(6)
2021–	Al Akhdar	73	(41)

International career^{‡}
2012–	Angola	59	(10)
- * Club domestic league appearances and goals as of 15 January 2025 ‡ National team caps and goals as of 9 June 2025

Manuel David Afonso (born 3 March 1994), known as Ary Papel, is an Angolan professional footballer who plays as winger for in Libyan Premier League club Al Akhdar.

== Club career ==
In 2018–19, he returned to Primeiro de Agosto in Angola's premier league, the Girabola after a stint in Liga NOS with Sporting CP B.

On 7 October 2020, Saudi club Al-Taawoun announced that Ary Papel would join them for two years. Three weeks later, he joined Egyptian club Ismaily.

== International career ==
On 3 December 2025, Papel was called up to the Angola squad for the 2025 Africa Cup of Nations.

Scores and results list Angola's goal tally first.

Goal	Date	Venue	Opponent	Score	Result	Competition
1.	15 October 2014	Estádio 11 de Novembro, Luanda, Angola	Lesotho	2–0	4–0	2015 Africa Cup of Nations qualification
2.	21 June 2015	Somhlolo National Stadium, Lobamba, Swaziland	Swaziland	2–0	2–2	2016 African Nations Championship qualification
3.	17 October 2015	Rand Stadium, Johannesburg, South Africa	South Africa	2–0	2–0	2016 African Nations Championship qualification
4.	25 January 2016	Stade Amahoro, Kigali, Rwanda	Ethiopia	1–0	2–1	2016 African Nations Championship
5.	25 January 2016	Stade Amahoro, Kigali, Rwanda	Ethiopia	2–0	2–1	2016 African Nations Championship
6.	8 October 2021	Estádio 11 de Novembro, Luanda, Angola	Gabon	2–0	3–1	2022 FIFA World Cup qualification
7.	26 March 2022	Estádio Municipal de Rio Maior, Rio Maior, Portugal	Guinea-Bissau	1–0	3–2	Friendly
8.	26 March 2022	Estádio Municipal de Rio Maior, Rio Maior, Portugal	Guinea-Bissau	3–1	3–2	Friendly
9.	8 October 2025	Somhlolo National Stadium, Lobamba, Eswatini	Eswatini	2–2	2–2	2026 FIFA World Cup qualification
10.	9 June 2026	Larbi Zaouli Stadium, Casablanca, Morocco	Central African Republic	3–0	3–0	Friendly

== Titles ==
- Libyan Premier League 2021/2022
- Girabola 2018 and 2019
- Angola Cup 2016
- Supertaça Angolana 2019-20

Individual

- Top scorer Libyan Premier League 2021-22: 12 goals
- Top scorer Libyan Premier League 2023-23: 17 goals
