= Neblú =

Angolan footballer (born 1993)

Personal information
- Full name: Adilson Cipriano da Cruz
- Date of birth: 16 December 1993 (age 32)
- Place of birth: Luanda, Angola
- Height: 1.83 m (6 ft 0 in)
- Position: Goalkeeper

Team information
- Current team: C.D. Primeiro de Agosto
- Number: 22

Senior career*
Years	Team	Apps	(Gls)
2011	ASA		
2012–2016	1º de Agosto	27	(0)
2016	G.D. Interclube	24	(0)
2017–2026	1º de Agosto	184	(0)
2026-	Petro de Luanda		

International career^{‡}
2012–	Angola	53	(0)
- * Club domestic league appearances and goals as of 9 May 2026 ‡ National team caps and goals as of 9 June 2026

Adilson Cipriano da Cruz (born 16 December 1993) is an Angolan footballer who goes by the nickname Neblú and plays as a goalkeeper for Petro de Luanda.

== International career ==
On 3 December 2025, Neblú was called up to the Angola squad for the 2025 Africa Cup of Nations.

=== Titles ===
2 Girabolas 1 Angola CUP 1 Angolan supercup 1 COSAFA CUP: 2025
