= Tony Cabaça =

Angolan footballer

Personal information
- Full name: Adão Joaquim Bango Cabaça
- Date of birth: 23 April 1986 (age 40)
- Place of birth: Luanda, Angola
- Height: 1.80 m (5 ft 11 in)
- Position: Goalkeeper

Senior career*
Years	Team	Apps	(Gls)
2007	ASA		
2011–2019	1º de Agosto		

International career^{‡}
- Angola
- * Club domestic league appearances and goals as of 21 June 2026 ‡ National team caps and goals as of 21 June 2026

Adão Joaquim Bango Cabaça best known as Tony Cabaça (born April 23, 1986) is an Angolan footballer who plays as a goalkeeper.
