= Paizo (footballer) =

Angolan footballer

Paízo
Personal information
- Full name: Salomão Manuel Troco
- Date of birth: 10 May 1992 (age 34)
- Place of birth: Luanda, Angola
- Height: 1.69 m (5 ft 7 in)
- Position: Left-back

Team information
- Current team: Interclube
- Number: 19

Senior career*
Years	Team	Apps	(Gls)
2012–2025	Primeiro de Agosto	284	(9)
2025-	Interclube	13	(0)

International career^{‡}
2012–	Angola	20	(0)
- * Club domestic league appearances and goals as of 19 May 2026 ‡ National team caps and goals as of 6 October 2019

Salomão Manuel Troco (born 10 May 1992) is an Angolan footballer who plays for Interclube and the Angola national football team.

== International career ==
Paízo made his senior international debut on 19 December 2012 in a 1-0 friendly victory over Cameroon.

== Honors ==
=== Club ===
Primeiro de Agosto

- Girabola Champion: 2018
