= Caála =

- Municipality and town
- Location in Angola
- Coordinates: 12°51′09″S 15°33′38″E
- Country: Angola
- Province: Huambo

Area
  - Municipality and town: 3,873 km^{2} (1,495 sq mi)

Population (2014 Census)
  - Urban: 130,000
- [municipality]366,480
- Time zone: UTC+1 (WAT)
- Climate: Cwb

Caála is a town and a municipality located 23 km west of the city of Huambo, in the namesake province in Angola. It was known as Vila Robert Williams while Angola was a Portuguese colony, after the railroad developer and mining magnate Sir Robert Williams. The town has a population of 130,000 and the municipality a population of 279,792 according to the 2014 census.

== History ==
Vila Robert Williams was the former name of Caála, in the then Portuguese Angola (before 1975). The town of Robert Williams was just west of Nova Lisboa (now Huambo) and was remarkable for huge outcroppings of boulders that jutted from the fields just outside the town. In those outcroppings researchers could find pottery shards, primitive metal smelting pits, and other archeological detritus.

== Sports ==
Caála is home to the local popular soccer club Clube Recreativo da Caála who plays in Angola's top league, the Girabola.

== Transport ==
Caála is served by a station on the Benguela Railway and is also the junction for a branch railway to Cuima. There are no airports found within 15 km around Caala, however one airport is within 50 kilometers.

== See also ==
- Sir Robert Williams
- Railway stations in Angola
