= Isaac Costa =

Angolan footballer (born 1991)

Isaac
Personal information
- Full name: Isaac Correia da Costa
- Date of birth: 25 April 1991 (age 35)
- Place of birth: Luanda, Angola
- Height: 1.69 m (5 ft 7 in)
- Position: Right-back

Team information
- Current team: Primeiro de Agosto
- Number: 19

Senior career*
Years	Team	Apps	(Gls)
2013–2014	Petro de Luanda		
2015–	Primeiro de Agosto	135	(4)

International career^{‡}
2012–	Angola	20	(0)
- * Club domestic league appearances and goals as of 6 October 2019 ‡ National team caps and goals as of 6 October 2019

Isaac Correia da Costa (born 25 April 1991) is an Angolan footballer who plays for C.D. Primeiro de Agosto and the Angola national football team.

== International career ==
Isaac made his senior international debut on 3 June 2012 in a world cup qualification 1–1 home draw against Cameroon.

== Honors ==
=== Club ===
Primeiro de Agosto

- Girabola Champion: 2018
