= Dani Massunguna =

Angolan footballer

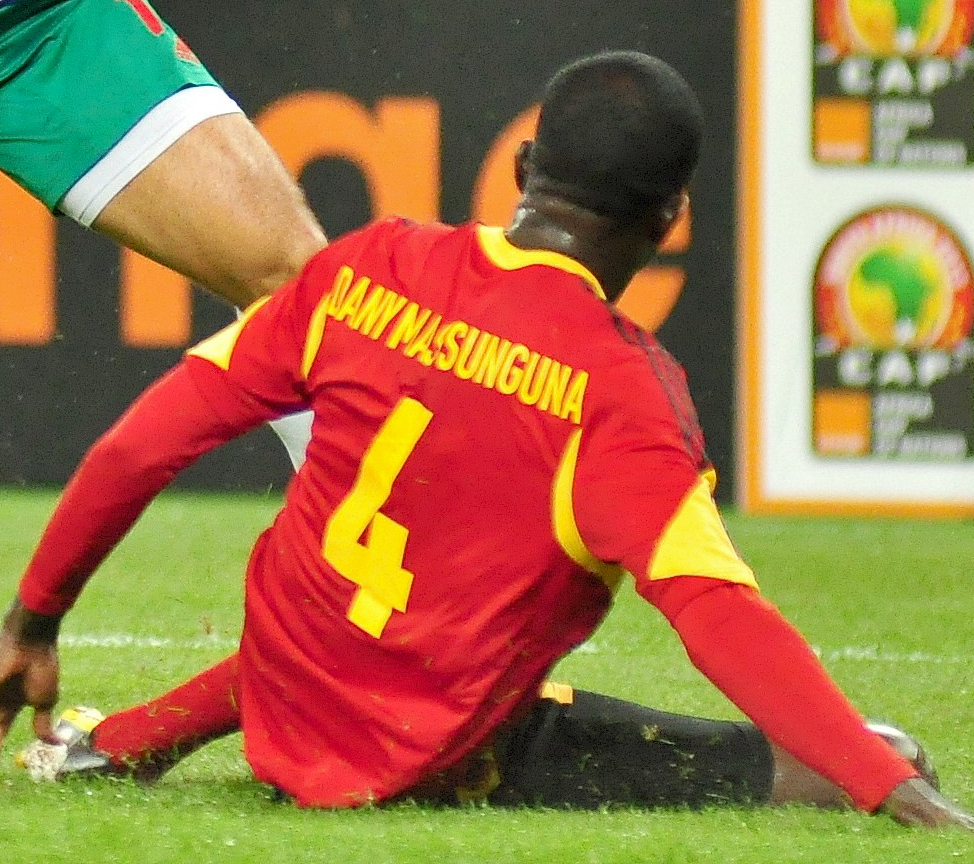
- Dani Massunguna in 2013

Personal information
- Full name: Alex Afonso Massunguna
- Date of birth: May 1, 1986 (age 40)
- Place of birth: Benguela, Angola
- Height: 1.80 m (5 ft 11 in)
- Position: Defender

Team information
- Current team: Primeiro de Agosto
- Number: 5

Youth career
- 1997–2002: Primeiro de Agosto

Senior career*
Years	Team	Apps	(Gls)
2002–2004	Primeiro de Agosto		
2005–2007	Desportivo da Huíla		
2008–2009	Primeiro de Maio		
2010–	Primeiro de Agosto		

International career^{‡}
2010–	Angola	50	(1)
Medal record
Men's football
Representing Angola
African Nations Championship
Runner-up	2011 Sudan
- * Club domestic league appearances and goals ‡ National team caps and goals as of 6 October 2019

Alex Afonso Massunguna (born May 1, 1986, in Benguela), better known as Dani Massunguna is an Angolan football defender who currently plays for Primeiro de Agosto.

== Club career ==
Massunguna started his career at Primeiro de Agosto, when he was promoted from the youth team in 2002. He played three seasons for them in the Girabola before moving to Deportivo Huíla in 2005. He spent two seasons for them before moving to Primeiro de Maio. Dani only played for them for one season before moving back to his first club, Primeiro de Agosto. He is now an integral part of their first team, and his good performances led to an international call-up.

== International career ==
Massunguna has so far won 50 caps for the Angolan national team.

=== International goals ===
Scores and results list Angola's goal tally first.

No.	Date	Venue	Opponent	Score	Result	Competition
1.	19 August 2017	Estádio 11 de Novembro, Luanda, Angola	Madagascar	1–0	1–0	2018 African Nations Championship qualification

== Honours ==
Angola

- African Nations Championship: runner-up 2011
