= 2018 C.D. Primeiro de Agosto season =

Clube Desportivo Primeiro de Agosto
2018 season
- President: Gen. Carlos Hendrick
- Manager: Zoran Manojlović (Dec 2017–Oct 2018)
- Stadium: Estádio 11 de Novembro
- Girabola: Champion
- Angola Cup: n/a
- Angola Super Cup: n/a
- Champions League: Semi-finals
- Top goalscorer: League: Jacques (8); All: Jacques (12)
- Biggest win: Kabuscorp 0–5 D'Agosto (30 Jun 2018)
- Biggest defeat: Espérance 4–2 D'Agosto (23 Oct 2018)
Home colours	Away colours	Third colours
- All statistics correct as of 23 October 2018.

The 2018 season of Clube Desportivo Primeiro de Agosto is the club's 40th season in the Girabola, the Angolan Premier football League and 40th consecutive season in the top flight of Angolan football. In 2018, the club participated in the Girabola and the 2018 CAF Champions League.

== 1º de Agosto vs TP Mazembe post-match incident ==
Five people were reportedly killed after the 45.000 capacity crowd match on Saturday 15 September, at the Estádio 11 de Novembro, including two children who were trampled and/or suffocated to death while exiting the stadium. Before the match began, supporters called a radio station urging the organization to open all gates after the match ended for fear of a tragedy and after going through similar ordeals in the past. The Angolan Ministry of Youth and Sports in a statement regretted the incident, expressed condolences to the relatives and vowed to launch an investigation. On their part, the club's management promised to assist the relatives in funeral expenses.

== Espérance Tunis vs 1º de Agosto ==
In 2018, they reached the semi-finals of the champions league where they were unfairly eliminated in a second-leg 4–2 defeat to Espérance Tunis with a heavily biased, shameful performance by referee Janny Sikazwe.

1º Agosto 3–0 FC Platinum

== Squad information ==
=== Players ===
No.	Nat	Nick	Name	Pos	Date of birth (age)
Goalkeepers
1	(Angola)	Julião	Justo Mateus Pucusso	–	15 July 1992 (aged 26)
12	(Angola)	Tony Cabaça	Adão Joaquim Bango Cabaça	–	23 April 1986 (aged 32)
22	(Angola)	Neblú	Adilson Cipriano da Cruz	–	16 December 1993 (aged 25)
Defenders
3	(Angola)	Natael	Natael Paulo Masuekama	LB	23 September 1993 (aged 25)
4	(Democratic Republic of the Congo)	Bobo	Beaudrick Muselenge Ungenda	CB	19 November 1989 (aged 29)
5	(Angola)	Dani (c)	Massunguna Alex Afonso	CB	1 May 1986 (aged 32)
6	(Angola)	Bonifácio	Bonifácio Francisco Caetano	CB	9 August 1993 (aged 25)
15	(Nigeria)	Yisa	Kehinde Yisa Anifowoshe	CB	11 October 1992 (aged 26)
19	(Angola)	Paizo	Salomão Manuel Troco	LB	10 May 1992 (aged 26)
21	(Angola)	Isaac	Isaac Correia da Costa	RB	25 April 1991 (aged 27)
Midfielders
2	(Angola)	Mário Balbúrdia	Mário César Azevedo Alves Balbúrdia	MF	19 August 1997 (aged 21)
7	(Angola)	Mingo Bile	Régio Francisco Congo Zalata	RW	15 June 1987 (aged 31)
8	(Angola)	Gogoró	João Ngunza Muanha	RW	6 June 1995 (aged 23)
9	(Angola)	Buá	Luvumbo Lourenço Pedro	DM	6 September 1988 (aged 30)
10	(Nigeria)	Ibukun	Ibukun Akinfenwa	CM	22 October 1990 (aged 28)
11	(Angola)	Geraldo	Hermenegildo da Costa Paulo Bartolomeu	LW	23 November 1991 (aged 27)
14	(Angola)	Nelson	Nelson Coquenão da Luz	MF	4 February 1998 (aged 20)
16	(Angola)	Macaia	José Macaia Ganga	CM	24 March 1994 (aged 24)
23	(Angola)	Show	Manuel Luís da Silva Cafumana	MF	6 March 1999 (aged 19)
24	(Angola)	Vanilson	Vanilson Tita Zéu	MF	20 March 1999 (aged 19)
25	(Angola)	Catraio	Zinedine Catraio	MF	17 June 1998 (aged 20)
28	(Angola)	Meda	Vidal Miguel Paulo Nsiandamba	MF	18 November 1992 (aged 26)
29	(Angola)	Melono	Melono Muondo Dala	LW	25 August 2001 (aged 17)
30	(Angola)	Cirilo	Cirilo Van-Dúnem da Silva	MF	2 March 1998 (aged 20)
Forwards
13	(Democratic Republic of the Congo)	Mongo	Kipe Mongo Lompala Bokamba	–	22 August 1993 (aged 25)
17	(Angola)	Guelor	Anderson Benjamim	–	10 August 1989 (aged 29)
18	(Angola)	Vado	Dorivaldo António Dias	–	25 January 1987 (aged 31)
20	(Democratic Republic of the Congo)	Jacques	Jacques Bakulu Bitumba	–	28 August 1993 (aged 25)
26	(Angola)	Fofó	Afonso Sebastião Cabungula	–	30 June 1994 (aged 24)
27	(Nigeria)	Razaq	Razaq Akanni Adegbite	–	20 December 1998 (aged 20)

=== Staff ===
Nat	Name	Position(s)	Date of birth (age)
Technical staff
(Serbia)	Zoran Manojlović	Head coach	21 July 1962 (aged 56)
(Angola)	Filipe Nzanza	Assistant coach	19 May 1969 (aged 49)
(Angola)	Ivo Traça	Assistant coach	19 May 1961 (aged 57)
(Angola)	Napoleão Brandão	Goalkeeper coach	13 June 1952 (aged 66)
Medical
(Cuba)	Abel Sanz	Physician	–
(Angola)	Leonilde Ferreira	Psychotherapist	–
(Angola)	Jorge Nabais	Fitness coach	–
(Angola)	Feliciano Madalena	Physio	–
(Angola)	Andrade Mendes	Physio	–
Management
(Angola)	Gen. Carlos Hendrick	Chairman	–
(Angola)	Paulo Magueijo	Vice-Chairman	–
(Angola)	José Marcelino	Head of Foot Dept	–
(Angola)	Carlos Alves	Spokesman	–

=== Pre-season transfers ===
No.	Nat	Nick	Name	Pos	Date of Birth (Age)	
Transfers out To
6	(Portugal)	Diogo Rosado	Diogo Jorge Rosado	MF	21 February 1990 (aged 28)	Gaz Metan Mediaș
13	(Angola)	Manucho Diniz	Osvaldo Paulo João Diniz	MF	4 June 1986 (aged 32)	Desportivo Huíla
22	(Angola)	Coio	Sebastião António Coio	GK	13 May 1998 (aged 20)	Desportivo Huíla
27	(Cape Verde)	Rambé	Ramilton Jorge Santos do Rosário	FW	4 October 1989 (aged 29)	–
26	(Angola)	Sargento	Antunes Sargento Ekundi	DF	10 January 1989 (aged 29)	Desportivo Huíla
30	(Angola)	Nuno	Gerson Agostinho Sebastião Cadete	GK	25 April 1983 (aged 35)	J.G.M.
Transfers in From
2	(Angola)	Mário	Mário César Balbúrdia	MF	19 August 1997 (aged 21)	Junior team
6	(Angola)	Bonifácio	Bonifácio Francisco Caetano	DF	9 August 1993 (aged 25)	Desportivo Huíla
30	(Angola)	Cirilo	Cirilo Van-Dúnem da Silva	MF	2 March 1998 (aged 20)	Junior team
26	(Angola)	Fofó	Afonso Sebastião Cabungula	FW	30 June 1994 (aged 24)	Progresso Sambizanga
20	(Democratic Republic of the Congo)	Jacques	Jacques Bakulu Bitumba	FW	28 August 1993 (aged 25)	Kabuscorp
13	(Democratic Republic of the Congo)	Mongo	Kipe Mongo Lompala Bokamba	MF	22 August 1993 (aged 25)	Kabuscorp
22	(Angola)	Neblú	Adilson Cipriano da Cruz	GK	16 December 1993 (aged 25)	Interclube
15	(Nigeria)	Yisa	Kehinde Yisa Anifowoshe	MF	11 October 1992 (aged 26)	Al-Ittihad Club
27	(Nigeria)	Razaq	Razaq Akanni Adegbite	FW	20 December 1998 (aged 20)	Doğan Türk Birliği

=== Mid-season transfers ===
No.	Nat	Nick	Name	Pos	Date of Birth (Age)	
Transfers out To
30	(Angola)	Cirilo	Cirilo Van-Dúnem da Silva	MF	2 March 1998 (aged 20)	(Angola) Desportivo da Huila
28	(Angola)	Meda	Vidal Miguel Paulo Nsiandamba	MF	18 November 1992 (aged 26)	(Angola) Domant FC
18	(Angola)	Vado	Dorivaldo António Dias	MF	25 January 1987 (aged 31)	(Angola) Bravos do Maquis
Transfers in From
29	(Angola)	Melono	Melono Muondo Dala	MF	25 August 2001 (aged 17)	(Angola) Junior team

== Overview ==
Competition	First match	Last match	Final position	Record							
Competition	First match	Last match	Final position	Pld	W	D	L	GF	GA	GD	Win %
Girabola	28 February 2018	2 September 2019	Winner	28	15	12	1	31	8	+23	53.57
CAF Champions League	11 February 2018	23 October 2018	Semi-finals	14	7	5	2	16	12	+4	50.00
Total				42	22	17	3	47	20	+27	52.38

Last updated: 23 October 2018

== CAF Champions League ==
=== Results summary ===
Overall								Home						Away					
Pld	W	D	L	GF	GA	GD	Pts	W	D	L	GF	GA	GD	W	D	L	GF	GA	GD
14	7	5	2	16	12	+4	26	5	2	0	10	3	+7	2	3	2	6	9	−3

Last updated: 23 October 2018.

=== Semi-finals ===
The heavily biased performance of Zambian referee Janny Sikazwe positively prevented D'Agosto from reaching the finals. The renowned referee had a disgraceful performance during the entire match, completely ignoring the rules of the game and clearly siding with the home team. The ice on the cake of his shameful performance occurred shortly before Espérance's final goal, when D'Agosto scored but he inexplicably disallowed the goal on a would-be push to the Tunisian goal-keeper. In the aftermath, Sikazwe was suspended by CAF on suspicion of corruption.

Tue, 23 Oct 2018 SF 2L	Espérance (Tunisia)	4–2	(Angola) 1º de Agosto	Stade Olympique, Radès
17:00 CET (UTC+1)	Belaïli 15' (pen.); Yacoubi 26'; Jouini 67'; Badri 83'		7' Geraldo; 57' Mongo	Referee: Janny Sikazwe; Romeo Kasengele, Kab Chansa (Zambia)
Note: Tony / Bobo, Dani (c), M.Bile, Paizo / Geraldo, Ibukun (substituted off) 46', Macaia, Show / Mongo (substituted off) 69', Razaq (substituted off) 83' — Mário (substituted on) 46', Guelor (substituted on) 69', Jacques (substituted on) 83'

Tue, 02 Oct 2018 SF 1L	1º de Agosto (Angola)	1–0	(Tunisia) Espérance	11 de Novembro, Luanda
17:00 WAT (UTC+1)	Buá 79'			Referee: Maguette Ndiaye; Djibril Camara, Hadji Samba (Senegal)
Note: Tony / Bobo, Dani (c), Isaac, Paizo / Geraldo, Ibukun (substituted off) 88', Macaia, Show / Jacques (substituted off) 76', Mongo (substituted off) 69' — Buá (substituted on) 69', Razaq (substituted on) 76', Yisa (substituted on) 88'

=== Quarter-finals ===
Fri, 21 Sep 2018 QF 2L	TP Mazembe (Democratic Republic of the Congo)	1–1	(Angola) 1º de Agosto	TP Mazembe, Lubumbashi
15:00 CAT (UTC+2)	Muleka 12'		33' Mongo	Referee: Mehdi Charef, Abdelhak Etchiali, Mokrane Gourari (Algeria)
Note: Tony / Bobo, Dani (c), Isaac, Paizo / Geraldo, Ibukun (substituted off) 90+2', Macaia, Show (substituted off) 75' / Jacques, Mongo (substituted off) 83' — Yisa (substituted on) 75', Mário (substituted on) 83', Buá (substituted on) 90+2'

Sat, 15 Sep 2018 QF 1L	1º de Agosto (Angola)	0–0	(Democratic Republic of the Congo) TP Mazembe	11 de Novembro, Luanda
17:00 WAT (UTC+1)				Referee: Rédouane Jiyed, Yahya Nouali, Essam Benpapa (Morocco)
Note: Tony / Bobo, Dani (c), Guelor, Isaac (substituted off) 59' / Ibukun, Mário, M.Bile, Show (substituted off) 61' / Jacques (substituted off) 77', Mongo — Buá (substituted on) 59', Macaia (substituted on) 61', Razaq (substituted on) 77'

=== Group stage ===
Pos	Team	Pld	W	D	L	GF	GA	GD	Pts	Qualification
1	(Tunisia) Étoile du Sahel	6	3	3	0	10	4	+6	12	Quarter-finals
2	(Angola) 1º de Agosto	6	2	3	1	6	5	+1	9	Quarter-finals
3	(Zambia) ZESCO United	6	1	3	2	7	6	+1	6	
4	(Eswatini) Mbabane Swallows	6	1	1	4	3	11	−8	4	

Source: CAF
Rules for classification: Group stage tiebreakers

Tue, 28 Aug 2018 GD R3 2L	1º de Agosto (Angola)	2–1	(Eswatini) Mbabane Swallows	11 de Novembro, Luanda
14:00 WAT (UTC+1)	Jacques 33'; Geraldo 37'	Report	57' Aladeokun	Referee: Ahmad Heeralall; Cauvelet Fabien, Ram Babajee (Mauritius)
Note: Tony / Bobo, Dani (c), M.Bile (substituted off) 77', Paizo / Geraldo, Ibukun, Mário (substituted off) 60', Show / Jacques, Mongo (substituted off) 80' — Macaia (substituted on) 60', Isaac (substituted on) 77', Buá (substituted on) 80'

Sat, 18 Aug 2018 GD R2 2L	Étoile du Sahel (Tunisia)	1–1	(Angola) 1º de Agosto	Stade Olympique, Sousse
20:00 CET (UTC+1)	Chermiti 87'	Report	12' Dani	Referee: Jean-Jacques Ngambo; Olivier Kabene (DRC), Soulaimane Amaldine (Comoros)
Note: Tony / Bobo, Dani (c), Guelor, Yisa / Ibukun, Mário (substituted off) 72', M.Bile (substituted off) 83', Show / Jacques, Mongo (substituted off) 62' — Fofó (substituted on) 62', Isaac (substituted on) 72', Macaia (substituted on) 83'

Fri, 27 Jul 2018 GD R1 2L	1º de Agosto (Angola)	2–1	(Zambia) ZESCO United	11 de Novembro, Luanda
17:00 WAT (UTC+1)	Geraldo 90'; Bobo 90+7'	Report	66' Ching'andu	Referee: Bernard Camille; Hensley Petrousse, James Emile (Seychelles)
Note: Tony / Bobo, Dani (c), Isaac, Paizo (substituted off) 72' / Ibukun, Mário (substituted off) 54', Mongo, Show / Jacques (substituted off) 55', Razaq — Buá (substituted on) 54', Geraldo (substituted on) 55', Guelor (substituted on) 72'

Tue, 17 Jul 2018 GD R3 1L	ZESCO United (Zambia)	0–0	(Angola) 1º de Agosto	Levy Mwanawasa, Ndola
15:00 CAT (UTC+2)		Report		Referee: Bamlak Weyesa; Temesgin Atango, Kindie Mussie (Ethiopia)
Note: Tony / Bobo, Dani (c), Guelor, M.Bile (substituted off) 70' / Geraldo (substituted off) 42', Ibukun, Mongo (substituted off) 83', Show, Yisa / Razaq — Isaac (substituted on) 42', Paizo (substituted on) 70', Buá (substituted on) 83'

Tue, 15 May 2018 GD R2 1L	Mbabane Swallows (Eswatini)	1–0	(Angola) 1º de Agosto	Mavuso, Manzini
15:00 SAST (UTC+2)	Badenhorst 59'	Report		Referee: Souleiman Djamal; Farhan Salime, Salah Mohamed (Djibouti)
Note: Neblú / Bobo, Dani (c), Isaac, Paizo / Bonifácio (substituted off) 64', Geraldo, Ibukun, Macaia (substituted off) 79' / Jacques, Mongo (substituted off) 78' — Fofó (substituted on) 64', Guelor (substituted on) 78', Buá (substituted on) 79'

Sat, 05 May 2018 GD R1 1L	1º de Agosto (Angola)	1–1	(Tunisia) Étoile du Sahel	11 de Novembro, Luanda
17:00 WAT (UTC+1)	Mongo 41'	Report	65' Jemal	Referee: Rédouane Jiyed; Hicham Abbou, Yahya Nouali (Morocco)
Note: Neblú / Bobo, Dani (c), Isaac, Paizo / Geraldo, Ibukun (substituted off) 83', Macaia, Fofó (substituted off) 71' / Jacques, Mongo (substituted off) 78' — Buá (substituted on) 71', Show (substituted on) 78', Nelson (substituted on) 83'

=== First round ===
Sat, 17 Mar 2018 FR 2L	Bidvest Wits (South Africa)	1–0 (2–3 p)	(Angola) 1º de Agosto	Bidvest, Johannesburg
17:00 SAST (UTC+2)	Dominguês 80'	Report		Referee: Hassan Hagi; Hamza Abdi, Bashir Suleiman (Somalia)
	Penalties
	Majoro (penalty missed); Dominguês (penalty missed); Klate (penalty missed); Frosler (penalty scored); Claasen (penalty scored)		(penalty scored) Isaac; (penalty missed) Ibukun; (penalty missed) Natael; (penalty scored) Paizo; (penalty scored) Geraldo
Note: Neblú (substituted off) 90+2' / Bobo, Dani (c) (substituted off) 25', Isaac, Natael / Geraldo, Ibukun, Macaia, Show / Jacques, Mongo (substituted off) 70' — Yisa (substituted on) 25', Paizo (substituted on) 70', Tony (substituted on) 90+2'

Wed, 07 Mar 2018 FR 1L	1º de Agosto (Angola)	1–0	(South Africa) Bidvest Wits	11 de Novembro, Luanda
16:00 WAT (UTC+1)	Geraldo 86'	Report		Referee: Antoine Essouma; Elvis Nguegoue, Ernest Ekokobe (Cameroon)
Note: Neblú / Bobo, Dani (c), Isaac, Natael / Geraldo, Ibukun (substituted off) 90', Nelson (substituted off) 65', Show / Jacques, Mongo (substituted off) 81' — Buá (substituted on) 65', Fofó (substituted on) 81', Macaia (substituted on) 90'

=== Preliminary round ===
Wed, 21 Feb 2018 PR 2L	FC Platinum (Zimbabwe)	1–2	(Angola) 1º de Agosto	Mandava, Zvishavane
15:00 CAT (UTC+2)	Chinyengetere 65'	Report	54' (o.g.) Mhango; 90+3' Jacques	Referee: Christofer Harrison; Athenkosi Ndongeni, John Mervyn (South Africa)
Note: Neblú / Bobo, Dani (c), Isaac, Natael / Geraldo (substituted off) 90+1', Ibukun, Macaia (substituted off) 80', Show / Jacques, Mongo (substituted off) 71' — Guelor (substituted on) 71', Yisa (substituted on) 80', M.Bile (substituted on) 90+1'

Sun, 11 Feb 2018 PR 1L	1º de Agosto (Angola)	3–0	(Zimbabwe) FC Platinum	11 de Novembro, Luanda
16:00 WAT (UTC+1)	Mongo 7'; Jacques 54', 61'	Report		Referee: Audrick Nkole; Oliver Mweene, Romeo Kasengele (Zambia)
Note: Neblú / Bobo, Dani (c), Isaac, Natael / Geraldo (substituted off) 85', Gogoró (substituted off) 50', Ibukun, Show / Jacques, Mongo (substituted off) 75' — Nelson (substituted on) 50', Buá (substituted on) 75', Fofó (substituted on) 85'

== Angolan League ==
=== League table ===
Pos	Team	Pld	W	D	L	GF	GA	GD	Pts	Qualification or relegation
1	Primeiro de Agosto (C)	28	15	12	1	31	8	+23	57	Qualification for Champions League
2	Petro de Luanda	28	14	12	2	38	15	+23	54	Qualification for Confederation Cup (Note: Due to the fact that this season's cup was not held.)
3	Interclube	28	12	6	10	32	23	+9	42	
4	Recreativo do Libolo	28	10	10	8	28	26	+2	40	
5	Académica do Lobito	28	9	11	8	19	21	−2	38	

Updated to match(es) played on 2 September 2018. Source: Girabola.com
Rules for classification: 1) Points; 2) Head-to-head points; 3) Head-to-head goal difference; 4) Goal difference; 5) Goals scored; 6) Fair-play points; 7) Play-off.
(C) Champions

=== Results ===
==== Results summary ====
Overall								Home						Away					
Pld	W	D	L	GF	GA	GD	Pts	W	D	L	GF	GA	GD	W	D	L	GF	GA	GD
28	15	12	1	31	8	+23	57	7	7	0	10	1	+9	8	5	1	21	7	+14

Last updated: 2 September 2018.

==== Results by round ====
Round	1	2	3	4	5	6	7	8	9	10	11	12	13	14	15	16	17	18	19	20	21	22	23	24	25	26	27	28	29	30
Ground	H	A	H	A	H	A	H	A	A	H	A	H	A	H	A	A	H	A	H	A	H	A	H	H	A	H	A	H	A	H
Result	D	W	W	L	W	D		D	W	D	W	W	W	W	W	D	D	D	D	W	D		D	D	W	W	W	W	D	W
Position	5	3	2	3	2	3		3	3	3	2	2	1	1	1	1	1	1	2	1	2		2	2	1	1	1	1	1	1

Updated to match(es) played on 2 September 2018. Source: Girabola
A = Away; H = Home; W = Win; D = Draw; L = Loss

==== Results overview ====
Win Draw Loss

Team	Home score	Away score
Progresso do Sambizanga	0-0	1-1
Primeiro de Maio	0-0	1–0
Bravos do Maquis	1–0	1-1
Académica do Lobito	0-0	0-1
Kabuscorp	3–1	5–0
Sporting de Cabinda	0-0	0-0
J.G.M.		
Recreativo do Libolo	0-0	0-0
Recreativo da Caála	0-0	2–0
Petro de Luanda	0-0	2–0
Domant FC	1–0	3–1
Desportivo da Huíla	1–0	2–1
Interclube	2–0	1–0
Sagrada Esperança	1–0	2-2
Cuando Cubango FC	1–0	1–0

=== Match details ===
Wed, 28 Feb 2018 01	1º de Agosto	0–0	Progresso	11 de Novembro, Luanda
17:30 WAT (UTC+1)		Report		Referee: Hélder Martins; Cláudio Francisco, Aldair Carmelino
Note: Neblú / Bobo, Guelor (substituted off) 81', Isaac, Yisa / Cirilo (substituted off) 72', Gogoró (substituted off) 62', Ibukun (c), Show / Jacques, Mongo — Razaq (substituted on) 62', Vado (substituted on) 72', M.Bile (substituted on) 81'

Sat, 03 Mar 2018 04	Académica	1–0	1º de Agosto	Estádio do Buraco, Lobito
15:00 WAT (UTC+1)	Lourenço 14'	Report		Referee: José Álvaro; Estanilau Guedes, Rosário Cassinga
Note: Neblú / Bobo, Dani, Guelor, M.Bile / Buá (substituted off) 81', Cirilo (substituted off) 46', Ibukun (c), Macaia / Fofó, Razaq (substituted off) 62' — Jacques (substituted on) 46', Mongo (substituted on) 62', Vado (substituted on) 81'

Sun, 11 Mar 2018 05	1º de Agosto	3–1	Kabuscorp	11 de Novembro, Luanda
17:00 WAT (UTC+1)	Ibukun 29'; Fofó 55', 82'	Report	74' Arouna	Referee: João Goma; José Felix, Dário Gaspar
Note: Neblú (substituted off) 42' / Bobo, Dani (c), Isaac, Paizo / Fofó, Geraldo, Ibukun (substituted off) 85', Show / Jacques, Mongo (substituted off) 66' — Tony (substituted on) 42', Macaia (substituted on) 66', Buá (substituted on) 85'

Sun, 01 Apr 2018 08	Rec do Libolo	0–0	1º de Agosto	Estádio Municipal, Calulo
15:00 WAT (UTC+1)				Referee: José Maxia; Cláudio Vunge, Celestino Golombole
Note: Neblú / Bobo, Dani (c), Isaac, Natael / Geraldo, Ibukun, Nelson (substituted off) 63', Show / Jacques, Mongo (substituted off) 45' — Razaq (substituted on) 45', Vado (substituted on) 63'

Sat, 07 Apr 2018 09	Rec da Caála	0–2	1º de Agosto	Mártires da Canhala, Caála
15:00 WAT (UTC+1)		Report	41' Razaq; 46' Ibukun	Referee: Paulo Talaia; Ricardo Daniel, Joaquim Chiyo
Note: Neblú / Bobo, Isaac, Paizo, Yisa / Geraldo (substituted off) 72', Ibukun (c), Macaia, Show (substituted off) 73' / Fofó, Razaq (substituted off) 82' — Natael (substituted on) 72', Buá (substituted on) 73', Jacques (substituted on) 82'

Sat, 14 Apr 2018 10	1º de Agosto	0–0	Petro Atlético	11 de Novembro, Luanda
17:00 WAT (UTC+1)		Report		Referee: Rodrigues Aleixo; Júlio Lemos, Ivanildo Lopes
Note: Neblú / Bobo, Isaac, Paizo, Yisa / Geraldo, Ibukun (c), Macaia, Show (substituted off) 70' / Fofó (substituted off) 63', Razaq (substituted off) 24' — Jacques (substituted on) 24', Buá (substituted on) 63', Natael (substituted on) 70'

Wed, 18 Apr 2018 03	1º de Agosto	1–0	Bravos Maquis	11 de Novembro, Luanda
16:00 WAT (UTC+1)	Geraldo 16'	Report		Referee: Pedro dos Santos; Luís Mateus, Pedro Futa
Note: Neblú / Bonifácio, Isaac, Paizo (substituted off) 33', Yisa / Buá (c) (substituted off) 33', Geraldo, Ibukun, Macaia / Fofó, Jacques (substituted off) 80' — Natael (substituted on) 33', Show (substituted on) 72', Guelor (substituted on) 80'

Sun, 22 Apr 2018 11	Domant FC	1–3	1º de Agosto	Municipal, Caxito
15:00 WAT (UTC+1)	Zizí 78'	Report	18' Geraldo; 29' Jacques; 90+3' Ibukun	Referee: Julião Mateus; Celso António, Luís Mateus
Note: Neblú / Bobo, Isaac, Natael, Yisa / Geraldo (substituted off) 76', Ibukun (c), Macaia, Medá (substituted off) 55' / Fofó (substituted off) 84', Jacques — Show (substituted on) 55', Nelson (substituted on) 76', Bonifácio (substituted on) 84'

Wed, 25 Apr 2018 12	1º de Agosto	1–0	Desportivo Huíla	11 de Novembro, Luanda
16:00 WAT (UTC+1)	Mongo 65'	Report		Referee: Paulo Talaia; Ricardo Daniel, Joaquim Chiyo
Note: Neblú / Dani (c), M.Bile, Natael, Yisa / Geraldo, Medá (substituted off) 45', Nelson (substituted off) 64', Show / Jacques, Vado (substituted off) 46' — Mongo (substituted on) 45', Razaq (substituted on) 46', Cirilo (substituted on) 64'

Sun, 29 Apr 2018 13	Interclube	0–1	1º de Agosto	22 de Junho, Luanda
16:00 WAT (UTC+1)		Report	59' Jacques	Referee: Pedro dos Santos; Júlio Lemos, Luís Mateus
Note: Neblú / Bobo, Dani (c), Isaac, Natael / Geraldo (substituted off) 86', Ibukun, Macaia, Mongo (substituted off) 74' / Fofó (substituted off) 58', Jacques — Buá (substituted on) 58', Bonifácio (substituted on) 74', M.Bile (substituted on) 86'

Sun, 20 May 2018 02	1º de Maio	0–1	1º de Agosto	Edelfride Costa, Benguela
16:00 WAT (UTC+1)			35' Bobo	Referee: Paulo Sérgio; Segunda Tchisseque, Elias Coimbra
Note: Tony / Bobo, Dani (c), M.Bile, Paizo / Geraldo, Ibukun, Macaia, Mongo (substituted off) 77' / Fofó (substituted off) 51', Razaq (substituted off) 76' — Gogoró (substituted on) 51', Jacques (substituted on) 76', Buá (substituted on) 77'

Fri, 25 May 2018 14	1º de Agosto	1–0	Sagrada	11 de Novembro, Luanda
17:30 WAT (UTC+1)	Jacques 62'			Referee: Bernardo Nangolo; Ivanildo Lopes, Evanildo Martins
Note: Tony / Dani (c), Isaac, Paizo, Yisa / Buá (substituted off) 83', Geraldo, Ibukun, Macaia (substituted off) 61' / Mongo, Razaq (substituted off) 46' — Jacques (substituted on) 46', M.Bile (substituted on) 61', Guelor (substituted on) 83'

Wed, 30 May 2018 15	Cuando Cubango FC	0–1	1º de Agosto	Municipal, Menongue
15:00 WAT (UTC+1)		Report	50' Jacques	Referee: António Dungula; Tito Capingala, Manuel Benguela
Note: Tony / Dani (c), Isaac, Paizo, Yisa / Buá (substituted off) 90+1', Geraldo, Ibukun, Macaia / Jacques (substituted off) 88', Mongo (substituted off) 73' — M.Bile (substituted on) 73', Razaq (substituted on) 88', Mário (substituted on) 90+1'

Sun, 03 Jun 2018 06	Sporting Cabinda	0–0	1º de Agosto	Tafe, Cabinda
15:00 WAT (UTC+1)				Referee: António Cachala; Júlio Lemos, Joaquim da Rocha
Note: Tony / Dani (c), Isaac, Paizo, Yisa / Buá (substituted off) 62', Geraldo, Ibukun, Macaia (substituted off) 13' / Jacques, Mongo (substituted off) 74' — M.Bile (substituted on) 13', Mário (substituted on) 62', Razaq (substituted on) 74'

Mon, 11 Jun 2018 16	Progresso	1–1	1º de Agosto	Coqueiros, Luanda
17:30 WAT (UTC+1)		Report		Referee: Bernardo Moreira; Aldair Carmelino, Adão Silva
Note: Tony / Bobo, Dani (c), Isaac, Paizo / Buá (substituted off) 71', Geraldo, Mongo (substituted off) 81', Show / Jacques (substituted off) 82', Fofó — Yisa (substituted on) 71', Mário (substituted on) 81', M.Bile (substituted on) 82'

Sun, 17 Jun 2018 17	1º de Agosto	0–0	1º de Maio	11 de Novembro, Luanda
17:30 WAT (UTC+1)		Report		Referee: Chitano Francisco; Wilson Ntyamba, Estanislau Prata
Note: Tony / Dani (c), Isaac, Paizo, Yisa / Geraldo, Ibukun (substituted off) 46', Mongo (substituted off) 64', Show / Jacques, Fofó (substituted off) 47' — Buá (substituted on) 46', Gogoró (substituted on) 47', Razaq (substituted on) 64'

Fri, 22 Jun 2018 18	Bravos Maquis	1–1	1º de Agosto	Mundunduleno, Luena
15:00 WAT (UTC+1)	Chico 4'	Report	14' (pen.) Buá	Referee: José Maxia; Cláudio Vunge, Flávio Dias
Note: Tony / Dani (c), Isaac, Paizo (substituted off) 69', Yisa / Buá, Mário, Gogoró, Show / Jacques (substituted off) 56', Fofó (substituted off) 79' — Geraldo (substituted on) 56', Melono (substituted on) 69', Mongo (substituted on) 79'

Tue, 26 Jun 2018 19	1º de Agosto	0–0	Académica	11 de Novembro, Luanda
17:30 WAT (UTC+1)				Referee: Carlos Silva; Manuel Lobe, Alberto Ndumbi
Note: Neblú (substituted off) 45+1' / Bobo, Dani (c), Isaac, Paizo (substituted on) 61' / Buá, Geraldo, Mário (substituted off) 46', Show / Gogoró, Melono — Tony (substituted on) 45+1', Mongo (substituted on) 46', Jacques (substituted on) 61'

Sat, 30 Jun 2018 20	Kabuscorp	0–5	1º de Agosto	11 de Novembro, Luanda
17:00 WAT (UTC+1)		Report	22' Dani; 50' Mongo; 58' Geraldo; 83', 89' Jacques	Referee: Airton Carmelino; Ivanildo Lopes, Evanildo Martins
Note: Tony / Bobo, Dani (c), Isaac, Paizo / Buá (substituted off) 74', Geraldo, Mário (substituted off) 82', Show / Melono (substituted off) 73', Mongo — Jacques (substituted on) 73', Fofó (substituted on) 74', Yisa (substituted on) 82'

Wed, 04 Jul 2018 21	1º de Agosto	0–0	Sporting Cabinda	11 de Novembro, Luanda
17:30 WAT (UTC+1)				Referee: Nuno Eduardo; Manuel Benguela, Nilton Armando
Note: Tony / Bobo, Dani (c), Isaac, Paizo (substituted off) 66' / Buá (substituted off) 47', Mário, Mongo, Show / Jacques, Melono (substituted off) 46' — Ibukun (substituted on) 46', Fofó (substituted on) 47', Guelor (substituted on) 66'

Wed, 11 Jul 2018 23	1º de Agosto	0–0	Rec do Libolo	11 de Novembro, Luanda
17:30 WAT (UTC+1)	Guelor (red card) 65'	Report		Referee: António Dungula; Tito Pena, José Siliya
Note: Tony / Bobo, Dani (c), Isaac, Paizo / Buá (substituted off) 47', Ibukun, Mário, Show / Gogoró (substituted off) 46', Melono (substituted off) 77' — Jacques (substituted on) 46', Guelor (substituted on) 47', Yisa (substituted on) 77'

Sun, 22 Jul 2018 25	Petro Atlético	0–2	1º de Agosto	11 de Novembro, Luanda
16:00 WAT (UTC+1)		Report	2' Razaq; 27' Mário	Referee: Hélder Martins; Jerson Emiliano, Wilson Ntyamba
Note: Tony / Bobo, Dani (c), Isaac, Paizo / Ibukun, Mário, Mongo (substituted off) 62', Show / Jacques (substituted off) 85', Razaq (substituted off) — Fofó (substituted on) 62', Buá (substituted on) , Yisa (substituted on) 85'

Tue, 31 Jul 2018 27	Desportivo Huíla	1–2	1º de Agosto	Estádio do Ferrovia, Lubango
15:00 WAT (UTC+1)	Beto 35'	Report	8' Mongo; 60' Melono	Referee: Chitano Francisco; Wilson Ntyamba, Andália Jeremias
Note: Tony / Dani (c), M.Bile, Paizo, Yisa / Ibukun, Macaia (substituted off) 57', Mário, Mongo / Jacques (substituted off) 81', Razaq (substituted off) 46' — Melono (substituted on) 46', Geraldo (substituted on) 57', Buá (substituted on) 81'

Sat, 04 Aug 2018 28	1º de Agosto	2–0	Interclube	11 de Novembro, Luanda
17:30 WAT (UTC+1)	Geraldo 17'; Buá 83'	Report		Referee: António Dungula; Wilson Ntyamba, Estanislau Prata
Note: Tony / Dani (c), Isaac, Paizo (substituted off) 45+2', Yisa / Ibukun, Mário, Mongo, Show / Geraldo (substituted off) 26', Razaq (substituted off) 64' — Jacques (substituted on) 26', Guelor (substituted on) 45+2', Buá (substituted on) 64'

Wed, 08 Aug 2018 24	1º de Agosto	0–0	Rec da Caála	11 de Novembro, Luanda
17:30 WAT (UTC+1)		Report		Referee: Paulo Sérgio; Segunda Tchisseque, Lídio Coimbra
Note: Tony / Bobo, Dani (c), Guelor, Isaac / Ibukun, Macaia (substituted off) 46', Mário / Jacques (substituted off) 56', Mongo, Razaq (substituted off) 79' — Buá (substituted on) 46', Melono (substituted on) 56', Fofó (substituted on) 79'

Sun, 12 Aug 2018 26	1º de Agosto	1–0	Domant FC	11 de Novembro, Luanda
17:30 WAT (UTC+1)	Edson 38' (o.g.)	Report		Referee: Miguel Mateus; Luís Mateus, Rosário Pedro
Note: Tony / Bobo, Dani (c), Guelor (substituted off) 47', M.Bile / Ibukun, Mário, Mongo, Show (substituted off) 46' / Jacques, Razaq (substituted off) 78' — Buá (substituted on) 46', Gogoró (substituted on) 47', Yisa (substituted on) 78'

Thu, 23 Aug 2018 29	Sagrada	2–2	1º de Agosto	Sagrada Esperança, Dundo
15:00 WAT (UTC+1)	Panilson 20'; Ben Traoré 26' (pen.)	Report	45' Geraldo; 60' Mário	Referee: Airton Carmelino; Ivanildo Lopes, Evanildo Martins
Note: Tony / Bobo, Dani (c), Guelor (substituted off) 53', Isaac / Buá, Mário, Mongo (substituted off) 77', Show / Jacques, Razaq (substituted off) 32' — Geraldo (substituted on) 32', Paizo (substituted on) 53', Melono (substituted on) 77'

Sun, 02 Sep 2018 30	1º de Agosto	1–0	Cuando Cubango FC	11 de Novembro, Luanda
15:00 WAT (UTC+1)	Jacques 14'	Report		Referee: Benjamin Andrade; Judith Mestre, Bernabé Ngulo
Note: Tony / Bobo, Dani (c), M.Bile, Paizo / Geraldo, Ibukun (substituted off) 75', Mário, Show / Jacques (substituted off) 42', Mongo (substituted off) 46' — Razaq (substituted on) 42', Buá (substituted on) 46', Macaia (substituted on) 75'

== Season statistics ==
=== Appearances and goals ===
No.	Pos	Nat	Player	Total		League		Champions	
No.	Pos	Nat	Player	Apps	Goals	Apps	Goals	Apps	Goals
Goalkeepers
12	GK	(Angola) ANG	Tony	28	0	17+2	0	8+1	0
22	GK	(Angola) ANG	Neblú	17	0	11	0	6	0
Defenders
3	DF	(Angola) ANG	Natael	11	0	4+3	0	4	0
4	DF	(Democratic Republic of the Congo) COD	Bobo	33	2	19	1	14	1
5	DF	(Angola) ANG	Dani	37	2	23	1	14	1
6	DF	(Angola) ANG	Bonifácio	4	0	1+2	0	1	0
15	DF	(Nigeria) NGA	Yisa	24	0	13+5	0	2+4	0
17	DF	(Angola) ANG	Guelor	17	0	5+5	0	3+4	0
19	DF	(Angola) ANG	Paizo	29	0	19+1	0	7+2	0
21	DF	(Angola) ANG	Isaac	35	0	22	0	10+3	0
Midfielders
2	MF	(Angola) ANG	Mário	21	2	12+3	2	4+2	0
7	MF	(Angola) ANG	Mingo Bile	18	0	6+6	0	5+1	0
8	MF	(Angola) ANG	Gogoró	8	0	4+3	0	1	0
9	MF	(Angola) ANG	Buá	34	3	12+12	2	0+10	1
10	MF	(Nigeria) NGA	Ibukun	36	3	21+1	3	14	0
11	MF	(Angola) ANG	Geraldo	33	9	18+3	5	11+1	4
13	MF	(Democratic Republic of the Congo) COD	Mongo	37	7	19+4	3	14	4
14	MF	(Angola) ANG	Nelson	6	0	2+1	0	1+2	0
16	MF	(Angola) ANG	Macaia	25	0	12+2	0	7+4	0
23	MF	(Angola) ANG	Show	33	0	18+2	0	12+1	0
28	MF	(Angola) ANG	Meda	2	0	2	0	0	0
30	MF	(Angola) ANG	Cirilo	3	0	2+1	0	0	0
Forwards
14	FW	(Angola) ANG	Melono	8	1	4+4	1	0	0
18	FW	(Angola) ANG	Vado	4	0	1+3	0	0	0
20	FW	(Democratic Republic of the Congo) COD	Jacques	41	12	19+9	8	12+1	4
26	FW	(Angola) ANG	Fofó	20	2	11+4	2	1+4	0
27	FW	(Nigeria) NGA	Razaq	22	2	11+6	2	3+2	0
Opponents
25	MF	(Zimbabwe) ZIM	Mhango	1	1	0	0	1	1
2	DF	(Angola) ANG	Edson	1	1	1	1	0	0
Total
Total				462(123)	47	308(79)	31	154(42)	16

=== Scorers ===
As of 23 October 2018

Rank	Name	League		Champions		Total	
Rank	Name	Apps	Goals	Apps	Goals	Apps	Goals
1	(Democratic Republic of the Congo) Jacques	19(9)	8	12(1)	4	31(8)	12
2	(Angola) Geraldo	18(3)	5	11(1)	4	29(4)	9
3	(Democratic Republic of the Congo) Mongo	19(4)	3	14	4	33(4)	7
4	(Angola) Buá	12(12)	2	(10)	1	12(22)	3
5	(Nigeria) Ibukun	21(1)	3	14	0	35(1)	3
6	(Angola) Fofó	11(4)	2	1(4)	0	12(8)	2
7	(Nigeria) Razaq	11(6)	2	3(2)	0	14(8)	2
8	(Angola) Mário	12(3)	2	4(1)	0	16(5)	2
9	(Democratic Republic of the Congo) Bobo	19	1	14	1	33	2
10	(Angola) Dani	23	1	14	1	37	2
11	(Angola) Melono	4(4)	1	0	0	4(4)	1
Opponents
–	(Zimbabwe) Mhango	–		–	1	–	1
–	(Angola) Edson	–	1	–		–	1
Total		–	31	–	16	–	47

- Note: Numbers in parentheses indicate appearances as substitute.

=== Clean sheets ===
As of 23 October 2018

Rank	Name	League		Champ		Total		%
		Apps	CS	Apps	CS	Apps	CS	
1	(Angola) Tony	17	13	8	3	25	16	64
2	(Angola) Neblú	11	8	6	2	17	10	58
3	(Angola) Julião	0	0	0	0	0	0	
Total			21		5		26	

=== Season progress ===
11/2	21/2	28/2	3/3	7/3	11/3	17/3	1/4	7/4	14/4	18/4	22/4	25/4	29/4	5/5	15/5	20/5	25/5	30/5	3/6	11/6	17/6	22/6	26/6	30/6	4/7	11/7	17/7	22/7	27/7	31/7	4/8	8/8	12/8	18/8	23/8	28/8	2/9	15/9	21/9	2/10	23/10
		PRO	ACL		KAB		LIB	CAA	PET	MAQ	DOM	DES	INT			MAI	SAG	CCU	SCC	PRO	MAI	MAQ	ACL	KAB	SCC	LIB		PET		DES	INT	CAA	DOM		SAG		CCU				
PLA	PLA			BID		BID								ESS	MBA												ZES		ZES					ESS		MBA		TPM	TPM	EST	EST

== See also ==
- List of C.D. Primeiro de Agosto players
