= 2017 C.D. Primeiro de Agosto season =

Clube Desportivo Primeiro de Agosto
2017 season
- President: Gen. Carlos Hendrick
- Manager: Dragan Jović (Apr 2014–Nov 2017)
- Stadium: Estádio 11 de Novembro
- Girabola: Champion
- Angola Cup: Runner-Up
- Angola Super Cup: Winner
- Champions League: Preliminary round
- Top goalscorer: League: Rambé (11); All: Geraldo (13)
- Biggest win: D'Agosto 4–0 Progresso (16 Apr 2017); J.G.M. 0–4 D'Agosto (18 Jun 2017)
- Biggest defeat: Kabuscorp 2–0 D'Agosto (21 May 2017)
Home colours	Away colours	Third colours
- All statistics correct as of 22 October 2017.

The 2017 season of Clube Desportivo Primeiro de Agosto is the club's 39th season in the Girabola, the Angolan Premier football League and 39th consecutive season in the top flight of Angolan football. In 2017, the club participated in the Supercup, the Girabola, the Angola Cup and the 2017 CAF Champions League.

== Squad information ==
Alternative 1	Alternative 2

=== Players ===
No.	Nat	Nick	Name	Pos	Date of birth (age)
Goalkeepers
1	(Angola)	Julião	Justo Mateus Pucusso	–	15 July 1992 (aged 25)
12	(Angola)	Tony Cabaça	Adão Joaquim Bango Cabaça	–	23 April 1986 (aged 31)
22	(Angola)	Coio	Sebastião António Coio	–	13 May 1998 (aged 19)
29	(Angola)	Dominique	António Signori Dominique	–	25 July 1994 (aged 23)
30	(Angola)	Nuno	Gerson Agostinho Sebastião Cadete	–	25 April 1983 (aged 34)
Defenders
3	(Angola)	Natael	Natael Paulo Masuekama	LB	23 September 1993 (aged 24)
4	(Democratic Republic of the Congo)	Bobo	Beaudrick Muselenge Ungenda	CB	19 November 1989 (aged 28)
5	(Angola)	Dani (c)	Massunguna Alex Afonso	CB	1 May 1986 (aged 31)
21	(Angola)	Isaac	Isaac Correia da Costa	RB	25 April 1991 (aged 26)
26	(Angola)	Sargento	Antunes Sargento Ekundi	CB	10 January 1989 (aged 28)
Midfielders
7	(Angola)	Mingo Bile	Régio Francisco Congo Zalata	RW	15 June 1987 (aged 30)
8	(Angola)	Gogoró	João Ngunza Muanha	RW	6 June 1995 (aged 22)
9	(Angola)	Buá	Luvumbo Lourenço Pedro	DM	6 September 1988 (aged 29)
10	(Nigeria)	Ibukun	Ibukun Akinfenwa	CM	22 October 1990 (aged 27)
13	(Angola)	Manucho	Osvaldo Paulo João Diniz	CM	4 June 1986 (aged 31)
14	(Angola)	Nelson	Nelson Coquenão da Luz	LW	4 February 1998 (aged 19)
16	(Angola)	Macaia	José Macaia Ganga	CM	24 March 1994 (aged 23)
19	(Angola)	Paizo	Salomão Manuel Troco	LW	10 May 1992 (aged 25)
23	(Angola)	Show	Manuel Luís da Silva Cafumana	MF	6 March 1999 (aged 18)
24	(Angola)	Vanilson	Vanilson Tita Zéu	MF	20 March 1999 (aged 18)
25	(Angola)	Catraio	Zinedine Catraio	MF	17 June 1998 (aged 19)
28	(Angola)	Meda	Vidal Miguel Paulo Nsiandamba	MF	18 November 1992 (aged 25)
Forwards
6	(Portugal)	Diogo	Diogo Jorge Rosado	–	21 February 1990 (aged 27)
11	(Angola)	Geraldo	Hermenegildo da Costa Paulo Bartolomeu	–	23 November 1991 (aged 26)
18	(Angola)	Vado	Dorivaldo António Dias	–	25 January 1987 (aged 30)
27	(Cape Verde)	Rambé	Ramilton Jorge Santos do Rosário	–	4 October 1989 (aged 28)

=== Staff ===
Nat	Name	Position(s)	Date of birth (age)
Technical staff
(Bosnia and Herzegovina)	Dragan Jović	Head coach	19 July 1963 (aged 54)
(Bosnia and Herzegovina)	Nedžad Selimović	Assistant coach	8 June 1973 (aged 44)
(Angola)	Filipe Nzanza	Assistant coach	19 May 1969 (aged 48)
(Angola)	Ivo Traça	Assistant coach	19 May 1961 (aged 56)
(Angola)	Napoleão Brandão	Goalkeeper coach	13 June 1952 (aged 65)
Medical
(Cuba)	Abel Sanz	Physician	–
(Angola)	Leonilde Ferreira	Psychotherapist	–
(Angola)	Jorge Nabais	Fitness coach	–
(Angola)	Feliciano Madalena	Physio	–
(Angola)	Andrade Mendes	Physio	–
Management
(Angola)	Gen. Carlos Hendrick	Chairman	–
(Angola)	Paulo Magueijo	Vice-chairman	–
(Angola)	José Marcelino	Head of Foot Dept	–
(Angola)	Carlos Alves	Spokesman	–

=== Pre-season transfers ===
No.	Nat	Nick	Name	Pos	Date of Birth (Age)	
Transfers out To
30	(Angola)	Ary Papel	Manuel David Afonso	FW	6 May 1994 (aged 23)	Sporting Portugal B
3	(Mali)	Diakité	Mourtala Diakité	FW	1 October 1980 (aged 37)	n/a
23	(Angola)	Fissy	Alberto Álvaro Paca	DF	29 June 1987 (aged 30)	Kabuscorp
27	(Angola)	Gelson	Jacinto Moundo Dala	FW	13 July 1996 (aged 21)	Sporting Portugal B
6	(Mozambique)	Jumisse	Eduardo Jumisse	MF	6 June 1984 (aged 33)	GD HCB Songo
17	(Angola)	Makiavala	Josemar Makiavala	FW	27 March 1991 (aged 26)	TEC
14	(Democratic Republic of the Congo)	Milambo	Albert Milambo-Mutamba	MF	1 December 1984 (aged 33)	Académica do Lobito
18	(Democratic Republic of the Congo)	Patrick	Patrick Lembo Anfumu	FW	15 September 1986 (aged 31)	Progresso Sambizanga
20	(Gabon)	Romaric	Romaric Rogombé	DF	25 November 1990 (aged 27)	n/a
4	(Angola)	Vado	Osvaldo Pedro de Jesus Kitenga	DF	20 May 1993 (aged 24)	Sagrada Esperança
Transfers in From
4	(Democratic Republic of the Congo)	Bobo	Beaudrick Muselenge Ungenda	DF	19 November 1989 (aged 28)	Kabuscorp
25	(Angola)	Catraio	Zinedine Catraio	MF	17 June 1998 (aged 19)	Junior team
22	(Angola)	Coio	Sebastião António Coio	GK	13 May 1998 (aged 19)	Junior team
6	(Portugal)	Diogo Rosado	Diogo Jorge Rosado	FW	21 February 1990 (aged 27)	Progresso Lunda Sul
17	(Angola)	Guelor	Anderson Benjamim	FW	10 August 1989 (aged 28)	ASA
16	(Angola)	Macaia	José Macaia Ganga	MF	24 March 1994 (aged 23)	Sporting Cabinda
28	(Angola)	Meda	Vidal Miguel Paulo Nsiandamba	MF	18 November 1992 (aged 25)	Kabuscorp
15	(Angola)	Nandinho	Fernando Manuel Morais	MF	24 May 1997 (aged 20)	Junior team
3	(Angola)	Natael	Natael Paulo Masuekama	DF	23 September 1993 (aged 24)	Recreativo Libolo
27	(Cape Verde)	Rambé	Ramilton Jorge Santos do Rosário	FW	4 October 1989 (aged 28)	Universitatea Craiova
23	(Angola)	Show	Manuel Luís da Silva Cafumana	MF	6 March 1999 (aged 18)	Junior team
18	(Angola)	Vado	Dorivaldo António Dias	FW	25 January 1987 (aged 30)	Benfica Luanda

=== Mid-season transfers ===
No.	Nat	Nick	Name	Pos	Date of Birth (Age)	
Transfers out To
24	(Angola)	Bruno	Bruno Manuel de Jesus	MF	25 September 1995 (aged 22)	Desportivo da Huíla
15	(Angola)	Nandinho	Fernando Manuel Morais	MF	24 May 1997 (aged 20)	Desportivo da Huíla
29	(Angola)	Dominique	António Signori Dominique	GK	25 July 1994 (aged 23)	–
Transfers in From
30	(Angola)	Nuno	Gerson Agostinho Sebastião Cadete	GK	25 April 1983 (aged 34)	Desportivo da Huíla
24	(Angola)	Vanilson	Vanilson Tita Zéu	MF	20 March 1999 (aged 18)	Junior team

== Overview ==
Competition	First match	Last match	Final position	Record							
Competition	First match	Last match	Final position	Pld	W	D	L	GF	GA	GD	Win %
Girabola	22 February 2017	5 November 2017	Winners	30	19	8	3	44	14	+30	63.33
Angola Cup	6 August 2017	11 November 2017	Runner-up	8	4	2	2	13	9	+4	50.00
Angola Super Cup	4 February 2017		Winners	1	1	0	0	1	0	+1	100.00
CAF Champions League	10 February 2017	19 February 2017	Preliminary round	2	1	0	1	2	2	+0	50.00
Total				41	25	10	6	60	25	+35	60.98

Last updated: 5 November 2017

== Angola Super Cup ==
4 February 2017
15:30

Primeiro de Agosto	1–0	Recreativo do Libolo
Geraldo 2'	Report

Estádio dos Coqueiros, Luanda
Attendance: 6,000
Referee: João Ngoma

D'Agosto	Libolo

GK	12	(Angola) Tony
RB	21	(Angola) Isaac
CB	4	(Democratic Republic of the Congo) Bobo	(yellow card) 58'
CB	5	(Angola) Dani (c)
LB	3	(Angola) Natael
RM	9	(Angola) Buá
CM	10	(Nigeria) Ibukun
CM	23	(Angola) Macaia
LM	19	(Angola) Paizo		(substituted off) 72'
CF	11	(Angola) Geraldo		(substituted off) 62'
CF	18	(Angola) Vado		(substituted off) 81'
Substitutions:
MF	8	(Angola) Gogoró		(substituted on) 62'
MF	14	(Angola) Nelson		(substituted on) 72'
FW	28	(Angola) Meda		(substituted on) 81'
Manager:
(Angola) Ivo Traça

GK	1	(Portugal) Ricardo
RB	27	(Angola) Carlitos (c)
CB	5	(Angola) Gomito
CB	6	(Angola) Celso
LB	18	(Angola) Eddie
RM	23	(Republic of the Congo) Kaya		(substituted off) 45'
CM	14	(Angola) Ito	(yellow card) 86'
CM	8	(Cape Verde) Sidnei
LM	7	(Angola) Viet		(substituted off) 76'
CF	9	(Brazil) Fabrício
CF	11	(Angola) Nandinho	(yellow card) 18'	(substituted off) 64'
Substitutions:
MF	30	(Angola) Higino		(substituted on) 45'
FW	17	(Angola) Cabibi		(substituted on) 64'
FW	15	(Angola) Paizinho		(substituted on) 76'
Manager:
(Portugal) Carlos Vaz Pinto

Assistant referees:
Júlio Lemos
Rosário Cassinda
Fourth official:
António Cachala

== Angolan League ==
=== League table ===
Pos	Team	Pld	W	D	L	GF	GA	GD	Pts	Qualification or relegation
1	Primeiro de Agosto (C)	30	19	8	3	44	14	+30	65	Qualification for Champions League
2	Petro de Luanda	30	20	2	8	46	20	+26	62	
3	Sagrada Esperança	30	15	8	7	34	23	+11	53	
4	Kabuscorp	30	13	11	6	40	29	+11	50	
5	Recreativo do Libolo	30	13	9	8	41	23	+18	48	

Updated to match(es) played on 3 November 2017. Source: Girabola.com
Rules for classification: 1) Points; 2) Head-to-head points; 3) Head-to-head goal difference; 4) Goal difference; 5) Goals scored; 6) Fair-play points; 7) Play-off.
(C) Champions

=== Results ===
==== Results summary ====
Overall								Home						Away					
Pld	W	D	L	GF	GA	GD	Pts	W	D	L	GF	GA	GD	W	D	L	GF	GA	GD
30	19	8	3	44	14	+30	65	13	1	1	25	4	+21	6	7	2	19	10	+9

Last updated: 5 November 2017.

==== Results by round ====
Round	1	2	3	4	5	6	7	8	9	10	11	12	13	14	15	16	17	18	19	20	21	22	23	24	25	26	27	28	29	30
Ground	H	A	A	H	A	H	A	H	A	H	A	H	A	H	A	A	H	H	A	H	A	H	A	H	A	H	A	H	A	H
Result	W	D	W	W	W	W	L	W	D	W	D	W	W	W	L	W	D	W	D	W	W	W	D	W	D	W	D	W	W	L
Position	2	3	2	2	1	1	2	2	3	2	5	3	1	1	2	2	2	1	2	2	1	1	2	1	2	1	1	1	1	1

Updated to match(es) played on 5 November 2017. Source: www.girabola.com
A = Away; H = Home; W = Win; D = Draw; L = Loss

=== Match details ===
Wed, 22 Feb 2017 01	1º de Agosto	2–0	J.G.M.	11 de Novembro, Luanda
17:00 WAT (UTC+1)	Meda 9'; Pick 90+4' (o.g.)	Report	(yellow card) 31' Rafa; (yellow card) 45' Deco	Attendance: 5,000; Referee: Benjamim Andrade; Judith Mestre, Bernabé Ngulo
Note: Tony / Bobo, Dani (c), Isaac, Natael / Buá, Ibukun, Nelson (substituted off) 45', Meda (substituted off) 45' / Diogo (substituted off) 60', Geraldo — Gogoró (substituted on) 45', Macaia (substituted on) 45', Rambé (substituted on) 60'

Sat, 25 Feb 2017 03	1º de Maio	0–3	1º de Agosto	Edelfride Costa, Benguela
15:30 WAT (UTC+1)	Yeyé (red card) 68'	Report	13' Vado; 44' Diogo; 90+4' Mingo Bile	Attendance: 8,000; Referee: Bernardo Nangolo; Elias Calei, Jeremias Cafussa
Note: Tony / Bobo, Dani (c), Mingo Bile, Paizo / Geraldo, Ibukun, Macaia, Meda (substituted off) 45' / Diogo (substituted off) 76', Vado (substituted off) 84' — Buá (substituted on) 45', Isaac (substituted on) 84', Rambé (substituted on) 76'

Wed, 1 Mar 2017 02	Rec da Caála	1–1	1º de Agosto	Mártires da Canhala, Caála
15:00 WAT (UTC+1)	Dudú (yellow card) 17'; Landry (yellow card) 40'; Careca 77'	Report	(yellow card) 31' (goal) 53' Geraldo	Attendance: 8,000; Referee: Paulo Talaia; Ricardo Daniel, Tchiyo
Note: Tony / Bobo, Dani (c), Isaac, Paizo / Buá (substituted off) 81', Ibukun, Macaia, Mingo Bile (substituted off) 45' / Diogo (substituted off) 73', Geraldo — Natael (substituted on) 45', Rambé (substituted on) 73', Medá (substituted on) 81'

Sun, 5 Mar 2017 04	1º de Agosto	2–0	Académica	11 de Novembro, Luanda
17:00 WAT (UTC+1)	Bobo 27' (yellow card) 31'; Rambé 73'	Report	(yellow card) 25' Zebedeu; (yellow card) 74' Guebuza	Attendance: 10,000; Referee: António Caxala; Evanildo Martins, José Félix
Note: Tony (c) / Bobo, Isaac, Natael, Sargento / Buá, Geraldo, Meda (substituted off) 45', Show / Diogo (substituted off) 45', Vado (substituted off) 71' — Nelson (substituted on) 45', Rambé (substituted on) 45', Paizo (substituted on) 71'

Fri, 10 Mar 2017 05	Desportivo Huíla	0–2	1º de Agosto	Estádio do Ferrovia, Lubango
15:00 WAT (UTC+1)	Muenho (yellow card) 28'; Kembua (yellow card) 63'	Report	(yellow card) 43' (goal) 72' Buá; 46' Mingo Bile	Attendance: 8,000; Referee: Feliciano Lucas; Horácio Tchissingui, Nicodemos Calembela
Note: Tony (c) / Bobo, Isaac, Natael, Sargento / Buá, Gogoró (substituted off) 45', Ibukun (substituted off) 24', Show / Diogo (substituted off) 69', Nelson — Meda (substituted on) 24', Mingo Bile (substituted on) 45', Rambé (substituted on) 69'

Tue, 14 Mar 2017 06	1º de Agosto	2–0	Bravos Maquis	11 de Novembro, Luanda
17:00 WAT (UTC+1)	Nelson 32'; Isaac 56'; Rambé (yellow card) 83'	Report	(yellow card) 16' Sávio; (yellow card) 68' Vado II	Referee: Miguel J. Mateus; Celestino Golombole, Celso António
Note: Tony (c) / Bobo, Isaac, Natael, Sargento / Buá, Meda (substituted off) 86', Nelson, Show / Diogo (substituted off) 61', Vado (substituted off) 88' — Rambé (substituted on) 61', Macaia (substituted on) 86', Paizo (substituted on) 88'

Sun, 19 Mar 2017 07	Sagrada	1–0	1º de Agosto	Sagrada Esperança, Dundo
15:30 WAT (UTC+1)	Femi 3'	Report		Referee: João Ngoma; Júlio Lemos, Ivanildo Lopes
Note: Tony (c) / Bobo, Isaac (substituted off) , Natael, Sargento / Buá, Meda (substituted off) , Paizo, Show / Diogo, Nelson (substituted off) — Vado (substituted on) , Gogoró (substituted on) , Rambé (substituted on)

Sun, 2 Apr 2017 08	1º de Agosto	1–0	Santa Rita	11 de Novembro, Luanda
16:30 WAT (UTC+1)	Vado (yellow card) 46'; Nelson 86'		(yellow card) 41' A.Doce; (yellow card) 55' Kiss; (yellow card) 90+3' Simão	Referee: Rodrigues Aleixo; Nicodemos Calembela, Francisco Paulo
Note: Tony (c) / Bobo, Dani (c), Mingo Bile, Vado / Buá, Diogo, Paizo, Show / Nelson, Guelor (substituted off) — Natael (substituted on) 46', Medá (substituted on) 46', Rambé (substituted on)

Sat, 8 Apr 2017 09	Petro Atlético	0–0	1º de Agosto	11 de Novembro, Luanda
18:00 WAT (UTC+1)	Nandinho (yellow card) 21'; Job (yellow card) 43'; Mabiná (yellow card) 28'		Bobo (yellow card) 24'; Buá (yellow card) 27'; Medá (yellow card) 74'	Attendance: 25,000; Referee: Pedro dos Santos; Jerson Emiliano, Wilson Ntyamba
Note: Tony (c) / Bobo, Dani (c), Natael, Paizo / Buá, Medá (substituted off) 74', Nelson, Show / Gogoró (substituted off) 46', Guelor (substituted off) 82' — Geraldo (substituted on) 46', Diogo (substituted on) 74', Vado (substituted on) 82'

Sat, 15 Apr 2017 10	1º de Agosto	4–0	Progresso	11 de Novembro, Luanda
17:00 WAT (UTC+1)	Rambé 10' 48'; Buá 13'; Geraldo 42'	Report		Referee: José Álvaro; Rosário Cassinda, Estanislau Prata
Note: Tony (c) / Bobo, Dani (c), Natael, Paizo / Buá (substituted off) , Medá, Nelson, Show / Geraldo (substituted off) , Rambé (substituted off) — Mingo Bile (substituted on) , Guelor (substituted on) , Macaia (substituted on)

Sun, 23 Apr 2017 11	Rec do Libolo	2–2	1º de Agosto	Estádio Municipal, Calulo
15:00 WAT (UTC+1)	Kuagica 5'; Fabrício 75' (pen.)		60' Rambé; 72' Vado	Referee: António Dungula; Bernabé Ngulo, Judith Mestre
Note: Julião / Bobo, Dani (c), Natael, Paizo / Macaia, Medá, Nelson, Show / Buá (substituted off) , Rambé (substituted off) 62' — Diogo (substituted on) 46', Vado (substituted on) 62', Gogoró (substituted on)

Sun, 30 Apr 2017 12	1º de Agosto	1–0	Interclube	11 de Novembro, Luanda
17:00 WAT (UTC+1)	Rambé 15'	Report		Attendance: 5,000; Referee: Hélder Martins; Jerson Emiliano, Wilson Ntyamba
Note: Julião / Bobo, Dani (c), Natael (substituted off) 8', Paizo / Macaia, Medá (substituted off) 78', Nelson, Show / Buá, Rambé (substituted off) 90+4' — Mingo Bile (substituted on) 8', Guelor (substituted on) 78', Vado (substituted on) 90+4'

Sat, 6 May 2017 13	Progresso LS	1–2	1º de Agosto	Mangueiras, Saurimo
15:00 WAT (UTC+1)	Hervé 9'	Report	86' Rambé; 90+' Vado	Attendance: 5,000; Referee: Paulo Sérgio; Tomás Lima, Segunda Tchisseque
Note: Julião / Bobo, Dani (c), Mingo Bile, Paizo / Macaia (substituted off) 45', Medá (substituted off) 68', Nelson, Show / Buá (substituted off) 74', Rambé — Vado (substituted on) 45', Gogoró (substituted on) 68', Guelor (substituted on) 74'

Sun, 14 May 2017 14	1º de Agosto	2–0	ASA	11 de Novembro, Luanda
17:00 WAT (UTC+1)	Nelson 32'; Vado 65'	Report		Attendance: 5,000; Referee: Nuno Eduardo; Nilton João, Manuel Bernardo
Note: Julião / Bobo, Dani (c), Mingo Bile, Gogoró / Buá (substituted off) 74', Medá (substituted off) 90', Nelson, Show / Rambé, Vado (substituted off) 80' — Ibukun (substituted on) 74', Guelor (substituted on) 80', Macaia (substituted on) 90'

Sun, 21 May 2017 15	Kabuscorp	2–0	1º de Agosto	11 de Novembro, Luanda
18:00 WAT (UTC+1)	Ebunga 5'; Mongo 60'			Referee: Hélder Martins; Júlio Lemos, Ivanildo Lopes
Note: Julião / Bobo, Dani (c), Natael, Paizo / Ibukun (substituted off) 65', Macaia (substituted off) 45', Nelson, Show / Rambé, Vado (substituted off) 35' — Buá (substituted on) 35', Medá (substituted on) 45', Geraldo (substituted on) 65'

Sun, 18 Jun 2017 16	J.G.M.	0–4	1º de Agosto	Kurikutelas, Huambo
15:00 WAT (UTC+1)		Report	18', 44' Geraldo; 55' Bobo; 83' Guelor	Referee: Maximina Bernardo; José Félix, Nery Silva
Note: Nuno / Bobo, Dani (c), Natael, Paizo / Buá, Macaia (substituted off) 74', Nelson (substituted off) 70', Show / Geraldo (substituted off) 77', Rambé — Mingo Bile (substituted on) 70', Sargento (substituted on) 74', Guelor (substituted on) 77'

Sun, 25 Jun 2017 17	1º de Agosto	0–0	Rec da Caála	11 de Novembro, Luanda
17:00 WAT (UTC+1)		Report	(yellow card) 82' Silva; (yellow card) 82' Lokwa	Referee: Mauro Oliveira; Ivanildo Lopes, Domingos Francisco
Note: Dominique / Bobo, Mingo Bile (c), Paizo, Sargento / Buá, Geraldo, Macaia, Meda (substituted off) 71' / Guelor, Rambé (substituted off) 46' — Diogo (substituted on) 46', Gogoró (substituted on) 71'

Sun, 02 Jul 2017 18	1º de Agosto	2–1	1º de Maio	11 de Novembro, Luanda
17:30 WAT (UTC+1)	Guelor 7'; Rambé 26'		84' Cristiano	Referee: Feliciano Lucas; Horácio Tchissingui, Alexandre Bengue
Note: Dominique / Bobo, Mingo Bile (c), Paizo, Sargento / Buá (substituted off) 55', Geraldo, Macaia, Meda / Guelor (substituted off) 87', Rambé (substituted off) 77' — Manucho (substituted on) 55', Vado (substituted on) 77', Gogoró (substituted on) 87'

Sun, 09 Jul 2017 19	Académica	1–1	1º de Agosto	Estádio do Buraco, Lobito
15:00 WAT (UTC+1)	Jiresse 64'		90+4' Rambé	Referee: Romualdo Baltazar; Pedro Alberto, Wilson Ntyamba
Note: Dominique / Bobo, Mingo Bile (c), Paizo, Sargento / Buá, Geraldo, Macaia (substituted off) 72', Meda (substituted off) 65' / Guelor, Vado (substituted off) 46' — Rambé (substituted on) 46', Diogo (substituted on) 65', Gogoró (substituted on) 72'

Sun, 16 Jul 2017 20	1º de Agosto	3–0	Desportivo Huíla	11 de Novembro, Luanda
17:00 WAT (UTC+1)	Rambé 28'; Geraldo 31', 39'			Referee: Ailton Carmelino; Orlando Pimenta, Domingos Cordeiro
Note: Dominique / Bobo, Mingo Bile (c), Paizo, Sargento / Buá (substituted off) 88', Geraldo, Macaia, Meda (substituted off) 70' / Guelor (substituted off) 82', Rambé — Ibukun (substituted on) 70', Vanilson (substituted on) 82', Catraio (substituted on) 88'

Sun, 30 Jul 2017 21	Bravos Maquis	0–1	1º de Agosto	Mundunduleno, Luena
15:00 WAT (UTC+1)		Report	49' Guelor	Referee: Paulo Talaia; Ricardo Daniel, Joaquim Tchiyo
Note: Nuno / Bobo, Natael, Paizo, Dani (c) / Buá, Ibukun, Mingo Bile (substituted off) 45+2', Macaia / Nelson, Rambé (substituted off) 90+2' — Guelor (substituted on) 45+2', Vado (substituted on) 90+2'

Sun, 27 Aug 2017 22	1º de Agosto	1–0	Sagrada	11 de Novembro, Luanda
17:00 WAT (UTC+1)	Rambé 15'	Report		Referee: Pedro dos Santos; Pedro Fula, Airton Carmelino
Note: Nuno / Bobo, Natael, Paizo, Dani (c) / Buá (substituted off) 77', Ibukun, Nelson, Show / Rambé (substituted off) 84', Guelor — Medá (substituted on) 77', Diogo (substituted on) 84'

Sat, 2 Sep 2017 23	Santa Rita	1–1	1º de Agosto	4 de Janeiro, Uíge
15:00 WAT (UTC+1)	Liliano 51'		31' Rambé	Referee: José Maxia; Cláudio Vunge, Flávio Dias
Note: Nuno / Bobo, Macaia (substituted off) 60', Natael, Sargento (substituted off) 78' / Ibukun (c), Medá (substituted off) 61', Nelson, Vado / Guelor, Rambé — Buá (substituted on) 60', Diogo (substituted on) 61', Manucho (substituted on) 78'

Sun, 10 Sep 2017 24	1º de Agosto	1–0	Petro Atlético	11 de Novembro, Luanda
17:00 WAT (UTC+1)	Bobo 74'	Report		Referee: António Caxala; Jerson Emiliano, Júlio Lemos
Note: Tony / Bobo, Dani (c), Natael, Paizo / Buá (substituted off) 83', Ibukun, Nelson, Show / Rambé (substituted off) 21', Vado (substituted off) 59' — Guelor (substituted on) 21', Geraldo (substituted on) 59', Macaia (substituted on) 83'

Sun, 17 Sep 2017 25	Progresso	0–0	1º de Agosto	Coqueiros, Luanda
17:30 WAT (UTC+1)		Report		Referee: António Dungula; Luís Mateus, José Felix
Note: Tony / Bobo, Natael, Paizo, Sargento (substituted off) 82' / Buá (c), Diogo (substituted off) 66', Macaia, Nelson / Guelor, Vado (substituted off) 46' — Geraldo (substituted on) 46', Meda (substituted on) 66', Gogoró (substituted on) 82'

Sun, 01 Oct 2017 26	1º de Agosto	1–0	Rec do Libolo	11 de Novembro, Luanda
17:30 WAT (UTC+1)	Dani 39'			Referee: Rodrigues Aleixo; Nicodemos Calembela, Francisco Paulo
Note: Tony (substituted off) 58' / Bobo, Dani (c), Natael, Paizo / Ibukun, Macaia, Medá (substituted off) 66', Nelson / Geraldo, Guelor (substituted off) 76' — Nuno (substituted on) 58', Buá (substituted on) 66', Mingo Bile (substituted on) 76'

Sat, 14 Oct 2017 27	Interclube	1–1	1º de Agosto	22 de Junho, Luanda
15:00 WAT (UTC+1)	Fabrício 64'	Report	37' Ibukun	Referee: Paulo Talaia; Judith Mestre, Tito Capingala
Note: Nuno / Bobo (substituted off) 34', Dani (c), Natael, Paizo / Ibukun (substituted off) , Macaia, Medá, Nelson (substituted off) 45' / Geraldo, Vado — Sargento (substituted on) 34', Guelor (substituted on) 45', Buá (substituted on)

Sun, 22 Oct 2017 28	1º de Agosto	2–1	Progresso LS	11 de Novembro, Luanda
17:30 WAT (UTC+1)	Geraldo 34'	Report	17' David; 66' (o.g.) Barrezó	Referee: Feliciano Lucas; Horácio Tchissingue, Alexandre Bengue
Note: Nuno / Bobo, Catraio, Paizo, Sargento / Buá (c) (substituted off) 60', Ibukun, Macaia, Nelson / Geraldo (substituted off) 77', Vado (substituted off) 46' — Rambé (substituted on) 46', Guelor (substituted on) 60', Meda (substituted on) 77'

Sun, 29 Oct 2017 29	ASA	0–1	1º de Agosto	Coqueiros, Luanda
15:00 WAT (UTC+1)		Report	43' Gogoró	Referee: Rodrigues Aleixo; Nicodemos Calembela, Francisco Paulo
Note: Nuno / Bobo, Dani (c), Natael, Paizo / Buá (substituted off) 87', Gogoró (substituted off) 72', Ibukun, Macaia / Diogo (substituted off) 68', Geraldo — Guelor (substituted on) 68', Nelson (substituted on) 72', Meda (substituted on) 87'

Sun, 05 Nov 2017 30	1º de Agosto	1–2	Kabuscorp	11 de Novembro, Luanda
15:00 WAT (UTC+1)	Diogo 12'	Report	87' Dr. Lami; 90+1' L.Tati	Referee: Inácio Rangel; Miguel Luvumbo, Luís Sá Miranda
Note: Julião / Dani (c), Mingo Bile, Paizo, Sargento / Gogoró, Macaia, Show (substituted off) 46', Vado (substituted off) 72' / Diogo (substituted off) 45', Rambé — Meda (substituted on) 45', Nelson (substituted on) 46', Geraldo (substituted on) 72'

== CAF Champions League ==
=== Preliminary round ===
Fri, 10 Feb 2017 PR 1L	Kampala City (Uganda)	1–0	(Angola) 1º de Agosto	Phillip Omondi, Kampala
16:00 EAT (UTC+3)	Sserunkuma 48'			Referee: Israel Mpaima; Peter Sabatia, Joshua Achila (Kenya)
Note: Tony / Bobo, Dani (c), Isaac, Natael /, Buá, Ibukun, Meda, Paizo (substituted off) 77' / Geraldo (substituted off) 67', Vado (substituted off) 81' — Gogoró (substituted on) 67', M.Bile (substituted on) 77', Nelson (substituted on) 78'

Sun, 19 Feb 2017 PR 2L	1º de Agosto (Angola)	2–1	(Uganda) Kampala City	11 de Novembro, Luanda
17:00 WAT (UTC+1)	Buá 31'; Geraldo 38'		21' Sserunkuma	Referee: Lazard Kamba; Styven Moyo, Blaise Boutamba (Congo)
Note: Tony / Bobo, Dani (c), Isaac, Natael /, Buá (substituted off) 85', Ibukun, Meda, Nelson (substituted off) 69' / Diogo (substituted off) 58', Geraldo — Vado (substituted on) 58', Gogoró (substituted on) 69', M.Bile (substituted on) 85'

== Angola Cup ==
=== Results ===
Overall								Home						Away					
Pld	W	D	L	GF	GA	GD	Pts	W	D	L	GF	GA	GD	W	D	L	GF	GA	GD
8	4	2	2	13	9	+4	14	2	0	2	6	7	−1	2	2	0	7	2	+5

Last updated: 5 November 2017.

=== Preliminary round ===
Sun, 6 Aug 2017 PR	AKC FC	1–2	1º de Agosto	Estádio dos Castilhos, Ondjiva
15:00 WAT (UTC+1)	Danax 43'		59' (pen.) Rambé; 87' Gui
Note: Nuno / Manucho, M.Bile, Paizo, Sargento / Gogoró, Ibukun, Macaia, Meda / Guelor, Rambé — Catraio (substituted on) , Gui (substituted on) , Vanilson (substituted on)

=== Round of 16 ===
Sat, 23 Sep 2017 R16	1º de Agosto	1–3	Académica Lobito	11 de Novembro, Luanda
16:00 WAT (UTC+1)	Geraldo 4'	Report	15' Milambo; 60', 90+3' Chiló	Referee: José Chitumba; Rosário Calembela, Elias Calei
Note: Tony / Bobo, Macaia, Natael, Paizo / Catraio (substituted off) 46', Ibukun (c), Nelson, Show / Geraldo (substituted off) 73', Guelor (substituted off) 45' — Meda (substituted on) 45', Vado (substituted on) 46', Diogo (substituted on) 73'

Wed, 27 Sep 2017 R16	Académica Lobito	0–4	1º de Agosto	Estádio do Buraco, Lobito
15:00 WAT (UTC+1)			32' Macaia; 67', 81' (pen.) Geraldo; 90' Nelson	Referee: João Ngoma; Luís Sá Miranda, Orlando Pimenta
Note: Tony / Bobo, M. Bile, Natael, Sargento (substituted off) 61' / Diogo, Ibukun, Macaia, Meda (substituted off) 64' / Guelor, Vado (substituted off) 45' — Nelson (substituted on) 45', Geraldo (substituted on) 61', Show (substituted on) 64'

=== Quarter-finals ===
Sat, 07 Oct 2017 QF	Interclube	1–1	1º de Agosto	22 de Junho, Luanda
15:30 WAT (UTC+1)	Duarte 38'	Report	52' Vado	Referee: António Dungula; Wilson Ntyamba, Evanildo Martins
Note: Nuno / Bobo, Dani, Natael, Paizo / Ibukun, Macaia, Meda (substituted off) 46', Nelson / Geraldo (substituted off) 87', Vado (substituted off) 58' — Buá (substituted on) 46', Guelor (substituted on) 58', M.Bile (substituted on) 87'

Tue, 17 Oct 2017 QF	1º de Agosto	1–0	Interclube	11 de Novembro, Luanda
16:00 WAT (UTC+1)	Geraldo 80'	Report		Referee: Pedro dos Santos; Júlio Lemos, Ivanildo Lopes
Note: Nuno / Dani, M.Bile, Natael, Sargento / Buá, Ibukun, Diogo (substituted off) 52', Show / Guelor, Vado (substituted off) 65' — Rambé (substituted on) 52', Geraldo (substituted on) 65'

=== Semi-finals ===
Wed, 25 Oct 2017 SF	1º de Agosto	3–2	Progresso	11 de Novembro, Luanda
16:00 WAT (UTC+1)	Diogo 14', 46'; Gogoró 54'	Report	38' Almeida; 79' Serge	Referee: João Goma; Júlio Lemos, Ivanildo Lopes
Note: Nuno / Bobo, M.Bile (substituted off) 90+3', Natael, Sargento / Macaia, Meda (substituted off) 46', Gogoró, Ibukun / Diogo (substituted off) 62', Guelor — Buá (substituted on) 46', Rambé (substituted on) 62', Vado (substituted on) 90+3'

Wed, 01 Nov 2017 SF	Progresso	0–0	1º de Agosto	Coqueiros, Luanda
16:00 WAT (UTC+1)				Referee: Julião Mateus; Ivanildo Lopes, Evanildo Martins
Note: Nuno / Bobo, Dani, Natael, Paizo / Gogoró, Ibukun (substituted off) 12', Meda, Show / Nelson, Guelor (substituted off) 45' — Buá (substituted on) 12', Diogo (substituted on) 45', Geraldo (substituted on)

=== Final ===
Sat, 11 Nov 2017
16:00

Petro Atlético	2–1	1º de Agosto
Job 40'; Azulão 56'	Report	57' Diogo

Estádio 11 de Novembro, Luanda
Attendance: 30.000
Referee: João Goma

Petro	D'Agosto

GK	22	(Angola) Gerson	(yellow card) 87'
RB	2	(Angola) Mira
CB	5	(Angola) Élio
CB	15	(Angola) Wilson
LB	7	(Angola) Diógenes	(yellow card) 54'
RM	11	(Angola) Job (c)		(substituted off) 86'
CM	18	(Angola) Herenilson	(yellow card) 60'
CM	10	(Angola) Manguxi
LM	19	(Brazil) Toni
FW	20	(Brazil) Diney		(substituted off) 64'
FW	26	(Brazil) Azulão
Substitutions:
MF	24	(Angola) Pedro		(substituted on) 64'
DF	3	(Angola) Ary		(substituted on) 86'
–
Manager:
(Brazil) Beto Bianchi

GK	30	(Angola) Nuno
RB	19	(Angola) Paizo		(substituted off) 80'
CB	4	(Democratic Republic of the Congo) Bobo
CB	5	(Angola) Dani (c)
LB	3	(Angola) Natael
RM	14	(Angola) Nelson
CM	10	(Nigeria) Ibukun		(substituted off) 81'
CM	23	(Angola) Show	(yellow card) 33'
LM	9	(Angola) Buá	(yellow card) 54'	(substituted off) 75'
FW	6	(Portugal) Diogo
FW	11	(Angola) Geraldo
Substitutions:
MF	8	(Angola) Gogoró		(substituted on) 75'
MF	7	(Angola) Mingo Bile		(substituted on) 80'
FW	27	(Cape Verde) Rambé		(substituted on) 81'
Manager:
(Bosnia and Herzegovina) Dragan Jović

Assistant referees:
Ivanildo Lopes
Evanildo Martins

Fourth official:
António Cachala

Commissioner:
Jorge Mário Fernandes

== Season statistics ==
=== Total results ===
Overall								Home						Away					
Pld	W	D	L	GF	GA	GD	Pts	W	D	L	GF	GA	GD	W	D	L	GF	GA	GD
41	25	10	6	60	25	+35	85	17	1	3	34	12	+22	8	9	3	26	13	+13

Last updated: 11 November 2017.

=== Appearances and goals ===
No.	Pos	Nat	Player	Total		League		Angola Cup		Super Cup		Champions	
No.	Pos	Nat	Player	Apps	Goals	Apps	Goals	Apps	Goals	Apps	Goals	Apps	Goals
Goalkeepers
1	GK	(Angola) ANG	Julião	6	0	6	0	0	0	0	0	0	0
12	GK	(Angola) ANG	Tony	18	0	13	0	2	0	1	0	2	0
29	GK	(Angola) ANG	Dominique	4	0	4	0	0	0	0	0	0	0
30	GK	(Angola) ANG	Nuno	14	0	7+1	0	6	0	0	0	0	0
Defenders
3	DF	(Angola) ANG	Natael	31	0	19+2	0	7	0	1	0	2	0
4	DF	(Democratic Republic of the Congo) COD	Bobo	38	3	29	3	6	0	1	0	2	0
5	DF	(Angola) ANG	Dani	26	1	19	1	4	0	1	0	2	0
19	DF	(Angola) ANG	Paizo	33	0	24+2	0	5	0	1	0	1	0
21	DF	(Angola) ANG	Isaac	10	1	6+1	1	0	0	1	0	2	0
26	DF	(Angola) ANG	Sargento	18	0	12+2	0	4	0	0	0	0	0
Midfielders
2	MF	(Angola) ANG	Gui	1	1	0	0	0+1	1	0	0	0	0
7	MF	(Angola) ANG	Mingo Bile	24	2	11+5	2	4+2	0	0	0	0+2	0
8	MF	(Angola) ANG	Gogoró	20	2	5+8	1	3+1	1	0+1	0	0+2	0
9	MF	(Angola) ANG	Buá	37	3	24+5	2	2+3	0	1	0	2	1
10	MF	(Nigeria) NGA	Ibukun	26	1	13+2	1	8	0	1	0	2	0
13	MF	(Angola) ANG	Manucho	3	0	0+2	0	1	0	0	0	0	0
14	MF	(Angola) ANG	Nelson	31	4	21+2	3	4+1	1	0+1	0	1+1	0
16	MF	(Angola) ANG	Macaia	31	1	19+6	0	5	1	1	0	0	0
23	MF	(Angola) ANG	Show	21	0	16	0	4+1	0	0	0	0	0
24	MF	(Angola) ANG	Vanilson	2	0	0+1	0	0+1	0	0	0	0	0
25	MF	(Angola) ANG	Catraio	4	0	1+1	0	1+1	0	0	0	0	0
28	MF	(Angola) ANG	Meda	36	1	18+9	1	5+1	0	0+1	0	2	0
Forwards
6	FW	(Portugal) POR	Diogo	24	5	11+6	2	4+2	3	0	0	1	0
11	FW	(Angola) ANG	Geraldo	28	13	14+5	7	3+3	4	1	1	2	1
17	FW	(Angola) ANG	Guelor	27	3	10+10	3	6+1	0	0	0	0	0
18	FW	(Angola) ANG	Vado	28	5	13+7	4	3+2	1	1	0	1+1	0
27	FW	(Cape Verde) CPV	Rambé	29	12	15+10	11	1+3	1	0	0	0	0
Opponents
8	DF	(Angola) ANG	Pick	1	1	1	1	0	0	0	0	0	0
21	DF	(Angola) ANG	Barrezó	1	1	1	1	0	0	0	0	0	0
Total
Total				451(113)	60	330(81)	44	88(23)	13	11(3)	1	22(6)	2

Last updated: 11 November 2017
Source: Competitions

=== Scorers ===
As of 11 November 2017

Rank	Name	League		Cup		Super Cup		Champions		Total	
Rank	Name	Apps	Goals	Apps	Goals	Apps	Goals	Apps	Goals	Apps	Goals
1	(Angola) Geraldo	14(5)	7	3(3)	4	1	1	2	1	20(8)	13
2	(Cape Verde) Rambé	15(10)	11	1(3)	1	–				16(13)	12
3	(Portugal) Diogo	11(6)	2	4(2)	3	0		1	0	16(8)	5
4	(Angola) Vado	13(7)	4	3(2)	1	1	0	1(1)	0	18(10)	5
5	(Angola) Nelson	21(2)	3	4(1)	1	(1)	0	1(1)	0	26(5)	4
6	(Angola) Guelor	10(10)	3	6(1)	0	–				16(11)	3
7	(Angola) Buá	24(5)	2	2(3)	0	1	0	2	1	29(8)	3
8	(Democratic Republic of the Congo) Bobo	29	3	6	0	1	0	2	0	38	3
9	(Angola) Gogoró	5(8)	1	3(1)	1	(1)	0	(2)	0	8(12)	2
10	(Angola) Mingo Bile	11(5)	2	4(2)	0	0		(2)	0	15(9)	2
11	(Angola) Gui	0	0	(1)	1	–				(1)	1
12	(Angola) Isaac	6	1	0	0	1	0	2	0	9	1
13	(Nigeria) Ibukun	13(2)	1	8	0	1	0	2	0	24(2)	1
14	(Angola) Macaia	19(6)	0	5	1	1	0	0	0	25(6)	1
15	(Angola) Meda	18(9)	1	5(1)	0	(1)	0	2	0	25(11)	1
16	(Angola) Dani	19	1	4	0	1	0	2	0	26	1
Opponents											
–	(Angola) Pick	–	1	–		–		–		–	1
–	(Angola) Barrezó	–	1	–		–		–		–	1
Total		–	44	–	12	–	1	–	2	–	59

- Note: Numbers in parentheses indicate appearances as substitute.

=== Clean sheets ===
As of 11 November 2017

Rank	Name	League		Cup		Champ		S.Cup		Total		%
		Apps	CS	Apps	CS	Apps	CS	Apps	CS	Apps	CS	
1	(Angola) Tony	12	11	2	1	2	0	1	1	17	13	76
2	(Angola) Dominique	4	2	0	0	0	0	0	0	4	2	50
4	(Angola) Nuno	7	4	6	2	0	0	0	0	13	6	46
3	(Angola) Julião	6	2	0	0	0	0	0	0	6	2	33
Total			19		3		0		1		23	

== See also ==
- List of C.D. Primeiro de Agosto players
