= 2017 Angola Cup =

Tournament details
- Country: Angola
- Dates: 5 Aug – 11 Nov 2017
- Teams: 23

Final positions
- Champions: Petro Atlético
- Runners-up: 1º de Agosto
- Confederation Cup: Petro Atlético (winner)

Tournament statistics
- Matches played: 35

The 2017 Taça de Angola was the 36th edition of the Taça de Angola, the second most important and the top knock-out football club competition following the Girabola.

The winner qualified to the 2018 CAF Confederation Cup.

== Stadia and locations ==
Locations of the 2017 Angola Cup teams

P	Team	Home city	Stadium	Capacity	2016	Current	P
6	Adecofil	Menongue	Campo Municipal	5,000	DNP	PR	n/a
5	Académica do Lobito	Lobito	Estádio do Buraco	3,000	QF	R16	▼1
6	Ajuda Social	Saurimo	Estádio das Mangueiras	7,000	DNP	PR	n/a
6	AKC FC	Ondjiva	Estádio dos Castilhos	429	DNP	PR	n/a
6	ASK Dragão	Uíge	Estádio 4 de Janeiro	12,000	DNP	PR	n/a
5	ASA	Luanda	Estádio da Cidadela	60,000	R16	R16	Steady
3	Bravos do Maquis	Luena	Estádio Mundunduleno	4,300	QF	SF	▲1
5	Domant FC	Caxito	Estádio Municipal do Dande	5,000	SF	R16	▼2
4	Interclube	Luanda	Estádio 22 de Junho	7,000	QF	QF	Steady
5	J.G.M.	Huambo	Estádio dos Kurikutelas	7,000	R16	R16	Steady
6	Jackson Garcia	Benguela	Estádio de São Filipe	5,000	R16	PR	▼1
4	Kabuscorp	Luanda	Estádio dos Coqueiros	8,000	R16	QF	▲1
1	Petro de Luanda	Luanda	Estádio 11 de Novembro	50,000	SF	Champion	▲2
2	Primeiro de Agosto	Luanda	Estádio 11 de Novembro	50,000	PR	Runner-Up	▲4
4	Primeiro de Maio	Benguela	Estádio Edelfride Costa	6,000	PR	QF	▲2
3	Progresso do Sambizanga	Luanda	Estádio dos Coqueiros	8,000	Runner-Up	SF	▼1
5	Progresso da Lunda Sul	Saurimo	Estádio das Mangueiras	7,000	R16	R16	Steady
5	Recreativo da Caála	Caála	Estádio Mártires da Canhala	12,000	PR	R16	▲1
5	Recreativo do Libolo	Calulo	Estádio Municipal de Calulo	10,000	Champion	R16	▼5
5	Sagrada Esperança	Dundo	Estádio Sagrada Esperança	8,000	QF	R16	▼1
4	Santa Rita de Cássia	Uíge	Estádio 4 de Janeiro	12,000	PR	QF	▲2
6	Sporting de Cabinda	Cabinda	Estádio do Tafe	25,000	PR	PR	Steady
6	Sporting do Bié	Kuito	Estádio dos Eucaliptos	16,000	DNP	PR	n/a

== Championship bracket ==
Preliminary Rounds; Sat, 5 Aug 2017
Sat, 5 Aug 2017 (pen)
Sporting do Bié	5
S^{ta} Rita de Cássia	6
Rec do Libolo (bye)
Sat, 5 Aug 2017 (pen)
ASK Dragão	6
J.G.M.	7
Petro de Luanda (bye)
Sat, 5 Aug 2017
Adecofil	1
1º de Maio	4
Sagrada Esperança (bye)
Sat, 5 Aug 2017 Walkover
Ajuda Social	0
ASA	3
Bravos do Maquis (bye)
Progresso LS (bye)
Interclube (bye)
Sun, 6 Aug 2017
Kafelango	1
1º de Agosto	2
Académica Lobito (bye)
Sat, 5 Aug 2017
Jackson Garcia	0
Recreativo Caála	1
Progresso (bye)
Sat, 5 Aug 2017
Sporting Cabinda	2
Kabuscorp	3
Domant FC (bye)

1/16 Finals; 23/27 Sep 2017
23/27 Sep 2017
S^{ta} Rita de Cássia	2 3
Rec do Libolo	1 3
23/27 Sep 2017 Walkover
J.G.M.
Petro de Luanda
23/27 Sep 2017
1º de Maio	3 1
Sagrada Esperança	2 1
24/27 Sep 2017
ASA	0 0
Bravos do Maquis	0 1
23/27 Sep 2017
Progresso LS	0 0
Interclube	0 2
24/27 Sep 2017
1º de Agosto	1 4
Académica Lobito	3 0
23/27 Sep 2017
Recreativo Caála	1 0
Progresso	2 1
23/27 Sep 2017
Kabuscorp	1 3
Domant FC	1 2

Quarterfinals; 7/18 Oct 2017
8/18 Oct 2017
S^{ta} Rita de Cássia	1 1
Petro de Luanda	2 1
7/19 Oct 2017
1º de Maio	0 0
Bravos do Maquis	1 1
7/17 Oct 2017
Interclube	1 0
1º de Agosto	1 1
7/18 Oct 2017
Progresso	2 3
Kabuscorp	1 1

Semifinals; 26 Oct / 1 Nov
26 Oct /1 Nov 2017
Petro de Luanda	2 0
Bravos do Maquis	0 1
25 Oct /1 Nov 2017
1º de Agosto	3 0
Progresso	2 0

Final; Sat, 11 Nov 2017
Sat, 11 Nov 2017
Petro de Luanda	2
1º de Agosto	1

== Preliminary rounds ==
Sat, 5 Aug 2017 PR	Ajuda Social	Walkover	ASA	Saurimo
15:00				Stadium: Estádio das Mangueiras

Sat, 5 Aug 2017 PR	Jackson Garcia	0–1	Recreativo Caála	Benguela
15:00			57' Zeca	Stadium: Estádio de S. Filipe; Referee: Bernardo Moreira; Aldair Carmelino, Nery da Silva

Sat, 5 Aug 2017 PR	Sporting Cabinda	2–3	Kabuscorp	Cabinda
15:00	Shoma 6'; Fuka 44'		38' Mongo; 55' Jacques; 83' Dr Lami	Stadium: Estádio do Tafe; Referee: António Caxala

Sat, 5 Aug 2017 PR	Sporting do Bié	2–2 (3–4 p)	S^{ta} Rita de Cássia	Kuito
15:00	Nick 10'; Kanjila 49'		66' Modeste; 73' Liliano	Stadium: Estádio dos Eucaliptos; Referee: Benjamim Andrade

Sat, 5 Aug 2017 PR	ASK Dragão	2–2 (4–5 p)	J.G.M.	Uíge
15:00	Zidane 48'; Disque 60'		(red card) Song; 88' Luciano; 90+2' Mazoua	Stadium: 4 de Janeiro; Referee: Maximina Bernardo; Domingos Cordeiro, Cláudio Francisco
	Penalties
	Luisão (penalty scored); Alberto (penalty scored); Nzau (penalty scored); Caixa (penalty scored); Disque (penalty missed)		(penalty scored) Dilman; (penalty scored) Luciano; (penalty scored) Geovani; (penalty scored) Viví; (penalty scored) Song

Sat, 5 Aug 2017 PR	Adecofil	1–4	1º de Maio	Menongue
15:00	Gildo 64'		7' Jó; 9', 26' (pen.) Kaporal; 28' Edú	Stadium: Estádio Municipal

Sun, 6 Aug 2017 PR	AKC FC	1–2	1º de Agosto	Ondjiva
15:00	Danax 43'		59' (pen.) Rambé; 87' Gui	Stadium: Estádio dos Castilhos

== Round of 16 ==
Sat, 23 Sep 2017 R16	Progresso LS	0–0	Interclube	Saurimo
15:00	Gerard (yellow card) 29'	Report	(yellow card) 27' Paty; (yellow card) 90+1' Roland	Stadium: Mangueiras; Referee: Paulo Talaia, Luís Mateus, Pedro Futa

Wed, 27 Sep 2017 R16	Interclube	2–0	Progresso LS	Luanda
15:00	Richard 27'; Mano 59'			Stadium: 22 de Junho; Referee: Mauro de Oliveira, Joaquim da Rocha, Dário Gaspar

Sat, 23 Sep 2017 R16	1º de Agosto	1–3	Académica Lobito	Luanda
16:00	Geraldo 4'	Report	15' Milambo; 60', 90+3' Chiló	Stadium: 11 de Novembro; Referee: José Chitumba, Rosário Calembela, Elias Calei

Wed, 27 Sep 2017 R16	Académica Lobito	0–4	1º de Agosto	Lobito
15:00			32' Macaia; 67', 81' (pen.) Geraldo; 90' Nelson	Stadium: Buraco; Referee: João Goma, Luís Sá Miranda, Orlando Pimenta

Sat, 23 Sep 2017 R16	Rec da Caála	1–2	Progresso	Caála
15:00	Landry 85'	Report	41' Celso; 88' Fofó	Stadium: Mártires da Canhala; Referee: Benjamin Andrade, Tito Capingala, Bernabé Ngulo

Wed, 27 Sep 2017 R16	Progresso	1–0	Rec da Caála	Luanda
15:00	Fofó 58'			Stadium: Coqueiros; Referee: Nuno Eduardo, Manuel Benguela, Nilton Eduardo

Sat, 23 Sep 2017 R16	Kabuscorp	1–1	Domant FC	Luanda
15:00	Basta 82' (o.g.)	Report	38' Angelino	Stadium: Coqueiros; Referee: Paulo Sérgio, Adália Jeremias, Luísa Luhaco

Wed, 27 Sep 2017 R16	Domant FC	2–3	Kabuscorp	Caxito
15:00	Abel 3'; Sigui 18'		10', 71' Dr Lami; 21' Mongo	Stadium: Estádio Municipal; Referee: José Maxia

Sat, 23 Sep 2017 R16	S^{ta} Rita de Cássia	2–1	Rec do Libolo	Uíge
15:00	Gazeta 1', 35'		19' Paizinho	Stadium: 4 de Janeiro

Wed, 27 Sep 2017 R16	Rec do Libolo	3–3	S^{ta} Rita de Cássia	Calulo
15:00	Figo 16'; Diawara 52'; Paizinho 82'	Report	2', 10' (pen.) Modeste; 64' Frank	Stadium: Municipal de Calulo; Referee: Pedro dos Santos, Evanildo Martins, Rosário Pedro

Sat, 23 Sep 2017 R16	J.G.M.	Walkover	Petro Atlético	Huambo
15:00				Stadium: Kurikutelas

Wed, 27 Sep 2017 R16	Petro Atlético	Walkover	J.G.M.	Luanda
15:00				Stadium: 11 de Novembro

Sun, 24 Sep 2017 R16	1º de Maio	3–2	Sagrada Esperança	Benguela
15:00	Brazuca 57'; Kaporal 86', 90+1'		24' (pen.) Tresor; 49' Adó Pena	Stadium: Edelfride Costa; Referee: Rodrigues Aleixo, Nicodemos Calembela, Paulo Van-Dúnem

Wed, 27 Sep 2017 R16	Sagrada Esperança	1–1	1º de Maio	Dundo
15:00	Dany 90'		33' Kaporal	Stadium: Sagrada Esperança; Referee: António Caxala, Domingos Cordeiro, Nery da Silva

Sun, 24 Sep 2017 R16	ASA	0–0	Bravos Maquis	Luanda
16:00	Milex (yellow card) 25'; Leandro (yellow card) 38'; Negra (yellow card) 78'	Report	(yellow card) 42' Borges; (yellow card) 87' Pataca; (yellow card) 90' Chole	Stadium: Coqueiros; Referee: António Dungula, Wilson Ntyamba, Muluta Prata

Wed, 27 Sep 2017 R16	Bravos Maquis	1–0	ASA	Luena
16:00	Djo 90+4'	Report		Stadium: Mundunduleno; Referee: Airton Carmelino, José Félix, Cláudio Francisco

== Quarter-finals ==
Sat, 07 Oct 2017 QF	Interclube	1–1	1º de Agosto	Luanda
15:30	Duarte 38'	Report	52' Vado	Stadium: 22 de Junho; Referee: António Dungula, Wilson Ntyamba, Evanildo Martins

Tue, 17 Oct 2017 QF	1º de Agosto	1–0	Interclube	Luanda
16:00	Geraldo 80'	Report		Stadium: 11 de Novembro; Referee: Pedro dos Santos, Júlio Lemos, Ivanildo Lopes

Sat, 07 Oct 2017 QF	Progresso	2–1	Kabuscorp	Luanda
17:00	Yano 35'; Fofó 72'	Report	47' Nelito	Stadium: Coqueiros; Referee: João Goma, Luís Sá Miranda, Orlando Pimenta

Wed, 18 Oct 2017 QF	Kabuscorp	1–3	Progresso	Luanda
16:00	Nari 32'	Report	26' (o.g.) Ebunga; 48' Yano; 90' Vá	Stadium: Coqueiros; Referee: António Cachala, Jerson Emiliano, Wilson Ntyamba

Sat, 07 Oct 2017 QF	1º de Maio	0–1	Bravos Maquis	Benguela
15:00			22' (pen.) Pataca	Stadium: Edelfride Costa; Referee: Rodrigues Aleixo, Nicodemos Calembela, Paulo Van-Dúnem

Thu, 19 Oct 2017 QF	Bravos Maquis	1–0	1º de Maio	Luena
15:00	Brazuca 65' (o.g.)	Report		Stadium: Mundunduleno; Referee: Feliciano Lucas, Orlando Pimenta, Aldair Quissanga

Sun, 08 Oct 2017 QF	S^{ta} Rita de Cássia	1–2	Petro Atlético	Uíge
15:00	Frank 53'		37' Manguxi; 40' Azulão	Stadium: 4 de Janeiro; Referee: Rodrigues Aleixo, Nicodemos Calembela, Francisco Paulo

Wed, 18 Oct 2017 QF	Petro Atlético	1–1	S^{ta} Rita de Cássia	Luanda
15:00	Bruno 45+1' (o.g.)	Report	84' Mavambu	Stadium: 11 de Novembro; Referee: Romualdo Baltazar, José Felix, Luís Sá Miranda

== Semi-finals ==
Wed, 25 Oct 2017 SF	1º de Agosto	3–2	Progresso	Luanda
16:00	Diogo 14', 46'; Gogoró 54'	Report	38' Almeida; 79' Serge	Stadium: 11 de Novembro; Referee: João Goma, Júlio Lemos, Evanildo Lopes

Wed, 01 Nov 2017 SF	Progresso	0–0	1º de Agosto	Luanda
16:00				Stadium: Coqueiros; Referee: Julião Mateus, Ivanildo Lopes, Evanildo Martins

Thu, 26 Oct 2017 SF	Petro Atlético	2–0	Bravos Maquis	Luanda
16:00	Azulão 17'; Job 87'			Stadium: 11 de Novembro; Referee: Romualdo Baltazar, Jerson Emiliano, Estanislau Prata

Wed, 01 Nov 2017 SF	Bravos Maquis	1–0	Petro Atlético	Luena
15:00	Yuri 6'			Stadium: Mundunduleno; Referee: Pedro dos Santos, Júlio Lemos, Luís Mateus

== Final ==
Sat, 11 Nov 2017
16:00

Petro Atlético	2–1	1º de Agosto
Job 40'; Azulão 56'	Report	57' Diogo

Estádio 11 de Novembro, Luanda
Attendance: 30.000
Referee: João Goma

Petro	D'Agosto

GK	22	(Angola) Gerson	(yellow card) 87'
RB	2	(Angola) Mira
CB	5	(Angola) Élio
CB	15	(Angola) Wilson
LB	7	(Angola) Diógenes	(yellow card) 54'
RM	11	(Angola) Job (c)		(substituted off) 86'
CM	18	(Angola) Herenilson	(yellow card) 60'
CM	10	(Angola) Manguxi
LM	19	(Brazil) Tony
FW	20	(Brazil) Diney		(substituted off) 64'
FW	26	(Brazil) Azulão
Substitutions:
MF	24	(Angola) Pedro		(substituted on) 64'
DF	3	(Angola) Ary		(substituted on) 86'
–
Manager:
(Brazil) Beto Bianchi

GK	30	(Angola) Nuno
RB	19	(Angola) Paizo		(substituted off) 80'
CB	4	(Democratic Republic of the Congo) Bobo
CB	5	(Angola) Dani (c)
LB	3	(Angola) Natael
RM	14	(Angola) Nelson
CM	10	(Nigeria) Ibukun		(substituted off) 81'
CM	23	(Angola) Show	(yellow card) 33'
LM	9	(Angola) Buá	(yellow card) 54'	(substituted off) 75'
FW	6	(Portugal) Diogo
FW	11	(Angola) Geraldo
Substitutions:
MF	8	(Angola) Gogoró		(substituted on) 75'
MF	7	(Angola) Mingo Bile		(substituted on) 80'
FW	27	(Cape Verde) Rambé		(substituted on) 81'
Manager:
(Bosnia and Herzegovina) Dragan Jović

Assistant referees:
Ivanildo Lopes
Evanildo Martins

Fourth official:
António Cachala

Commissioner:
Jorge Mário Fernandes

2017 Angola Football Cup winner

12th title

Squad:
Augusto, Gerson, Lamá (GK)
Abdul, Ary, Maludi, Mira, Élio, Eliseu, Mabiná, Wilson (DF)
Balacai, Bebo, Carlinhos, Diney, Diógenes, Herenilson, Job, Manguxi, Mateus, Nandinho (MF)
Azulão, Dennis, Pedro, Tony (FW)
Beto Bianchi (Head Coach)

== See also ==
- 2017 Girabola
- 2018 Angola Super Cup
- 2018 CAF Confederation Cup
