= 2017 Angola Super Cup =

Supertaça de Angola 2017
| 1º de Agosto | Rec do Libolo |
| Girabola | Taça Angola |
| 1 | 0 |
- Date: February 4, 2017
- Venue: Estádio dos Coqueiros, Luanda
- Man of the Match: Luvumbo Pedro Buá
- Referee: João Ngoma
- Attendance: 6,000

The 2017 Supertaça de Angola (30th edition) was contested by Primeiro de Agosto, the 2016 Girabola champion and Recreativo do Libolo, the 2016 cup winner. Primeiro de Agosto won the match, making it its 8th super cup win.

== Match details ==
4 February 2017
15:30

| Primeiro de Agosto | 1–0 | Recreativo do Libolo |
|---|---|---|
| Geraldo 2' | Report |

Estádio dos Coqueiros, Luanda
Attendance: 6,000
Referee: João Ngoma

| D'Agosto | Libolo |

| GK | 12 | (Angola) Tony |
| RB | 21 | (Angola) Isaac |
| CB | 4 | (Democratic Republic of the Congo) Bobo | (yellow card) 58' |
| CB | 5 | (Angola) Dani (c) |
| LB | 3 | (Angola) Natael |
| RM | 9 | (Angola) Buá |
| CM | 10 | (Nigeria) Ibukun |
| CM | 23 | (Angola) Macaia |
| LM | 19 | (Angola) Paizo | | (substituted off) 72' |
| CF | 11 | (Angola) Geraldo | | (substituted off) 62' |
| CF | 18 | (Angola) Vado | | (substituted off) 81' |
Substitutions:
| MF | 8 | (Angola) Gogoró | | (substituted in) 62' |
| MF | 14 | (Angola) Nelson | | (substituted in) 72' |
| MF | 28 | (Angola) Meda | | (substituted in) 81' |
Manager:
(Angola) Ivo Traça

| GK | 1 | (Portugal) Ricardo |
| RB | 27 | (Angola) Carlitos (c) |
| CB | 5 | (Angola) Gomito |
| CB | 6 | (Angola) Celso |
| LB | 18 | (Angola) Eddie |
| RM | 23 | (Republic of the Congo) Kaya | | (substituted off) 45' |
| CM | 14 | (Angola) Ito | (yellow card) 86' |
| CM | 8 | (Cape Verde) Sidnei |
| LM | 7 | (Angola) Viet | | (substituted off) 76' |
| CF | 9 | (Brazil) Fabrício |
| CF | 11 | (Angola) Nandinho | (yellow card) 18' | (substituted off) 64' |
Substitutions:
| MF | 30 | (Angola) Higino | | (substituted in) 45' |
| FW | 17 | (Angola) Cabibi | | (substituted in) 64' |
| FW | 15 | (Angola) Paizinho | | (substituted in) 76' |
Manager:
(Portugal) Carlos Vaz Pinto

Assistant referees:
Júlio Lemos
Rosário Cassinda
Fourth official:
António Cachala

2017 Angola Super Cup winner
Clube Desportivo Primeiro de Agosto
8th title

Squad:
Coio, Dominique, Julião, Tony (GK)
Bobó, Dani, Isaac, Natael, Paizo, Sargento (DF)
Bruno, Buá, Catraio, Geraldo, Gogoró, Gui, Ibukun, Macaia, Manucho, Medá, M.Bile, Nelson, Show (MF)
Diogo, Guelor, Nandinho, Rambé, Vado (FW)
Ivo Traça (Head Coach)

== See also ==
- 2016 Angola Cup
- 2017 Girabola
- 2017 Primeiro de Agosto season
- 2017 Recreativo do Libolo season
