= Razaq Adegbite =

Nigerian footballer (born 1992)

Razaq Akanni Adegbite
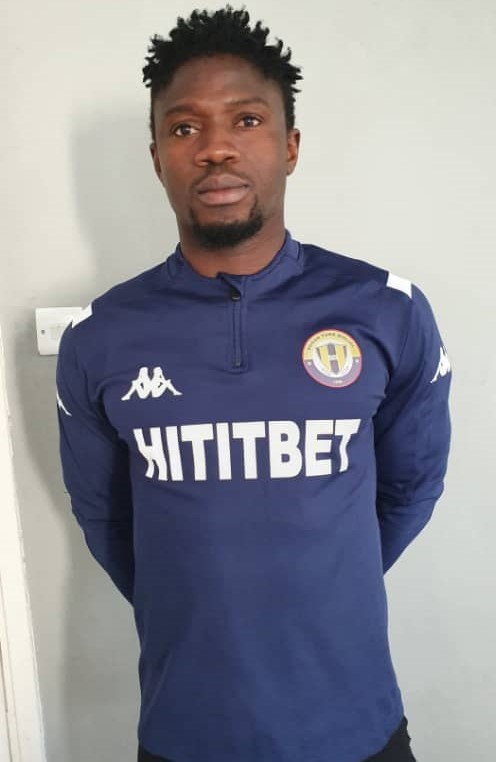

Personal information
- Full name: Razaq Akanni Adegbite
- Date of birth: 20 December 1992 (age 33)
- Place of birth: Lagos, Nigeria
- Height: 1.83 m (6 ft 0 in)
- Position: Forward

Youth career
- 2006–2010: Karamone

Senior career*
Years	Team	Apps	(Gls)
2010–2011	Gateway United	27	(14)
2011–2012	Enugu Rangers	43	(23)
2012–2013	Enyimba International	14	(8)
2013–2014	Enugu Rangers	21	(12)
2015–2016	Sunshine Stars	23	(12)
2016–2017	Kano Pillars	19	(10)
2017	Doğan Türk Birliği	13	(7)
2018–2019	1º de Agosto	11	(8)
2019	Desportivo da Huíla	15	(4)
2019	US Tataouine		
2019	Sunshine Stars		
2020	Doğan Türk Birliği	8	(4)
2020–2021	Happy Valley	15	(1)

International career^{‡}
	Nigeria U-17	6	(3)
	Nigeria U-20	7	(4)
- * Club domestic league appearances and goals as of 30 May 2021 ‡ National team caps and goals as of 31 May 2015

Razaq Akanni Adegbite (born 20 December 1992) is a Nigerian professional footballer who plays as a forward.

== Club career ==
Adegbite Razaq started his playing career with Karamone youth team later joined Gateway United, before he later joined Enugu Rangers. Razaq has a brother also playing professional football in Nigeria Professional League known as Adegbite Alhameen Adeniyi who also started his football youth career with Karamone.

In 2012 Enugu Rangers warned Enyimba Internstional off, but Adegbite decided to join Enyimba International, Jomo Cosmos (working permit delay) and cancellation of deal with Kahramanspor due to disagreement of transfer clauses then returned to Nigeria to extend his contract with Enugu Rangers. He went on to sign a deal with Kano Pillars within 2016 and 2017. He joined Cyprus based club Doğan Türk Birliği in 2017.

In 2018, he signed in for Primeiro de Agosto and in 2018–19, he was loaned to Desportivo da Huíla in Angola's premier league, the Girabola.

Razaq joined Desportivo da Huíla on loan in 2019. In the summer 2019, he joined Tunisian club US Tataouine but left the club a few months later and returned to Nigeria to join Sunshine Stars. In January 2020, he returned to Turkish Cypriot club Doğan Türk Birliği.

On 2 November 2020, it was announced that Razaq had joined Hong Kong Premier League club Happy Valley.

== International career ==
Razaq has earned 6 appearances, scoring 3 goals for the Nigeria U-17. Rasaq has also earned 7 appearances, scoring 4 goals for the Nigeria U-20. In 2014, the striker was invited by the Nigeria national football team in an international friendly match.

== CAF Champions League ==
He had featured for Enugu Rangers International FC in the 2012–13 CAF Champions League and Enyimba in 2013–14 respectively. He was swapped to Enyimba International F.C. when Enyimba needed him badly and replaced with Ifeanyi Ede to Enugu Rangers.
