= Geraldo (footballer, born 1991) =

Angolan footballer

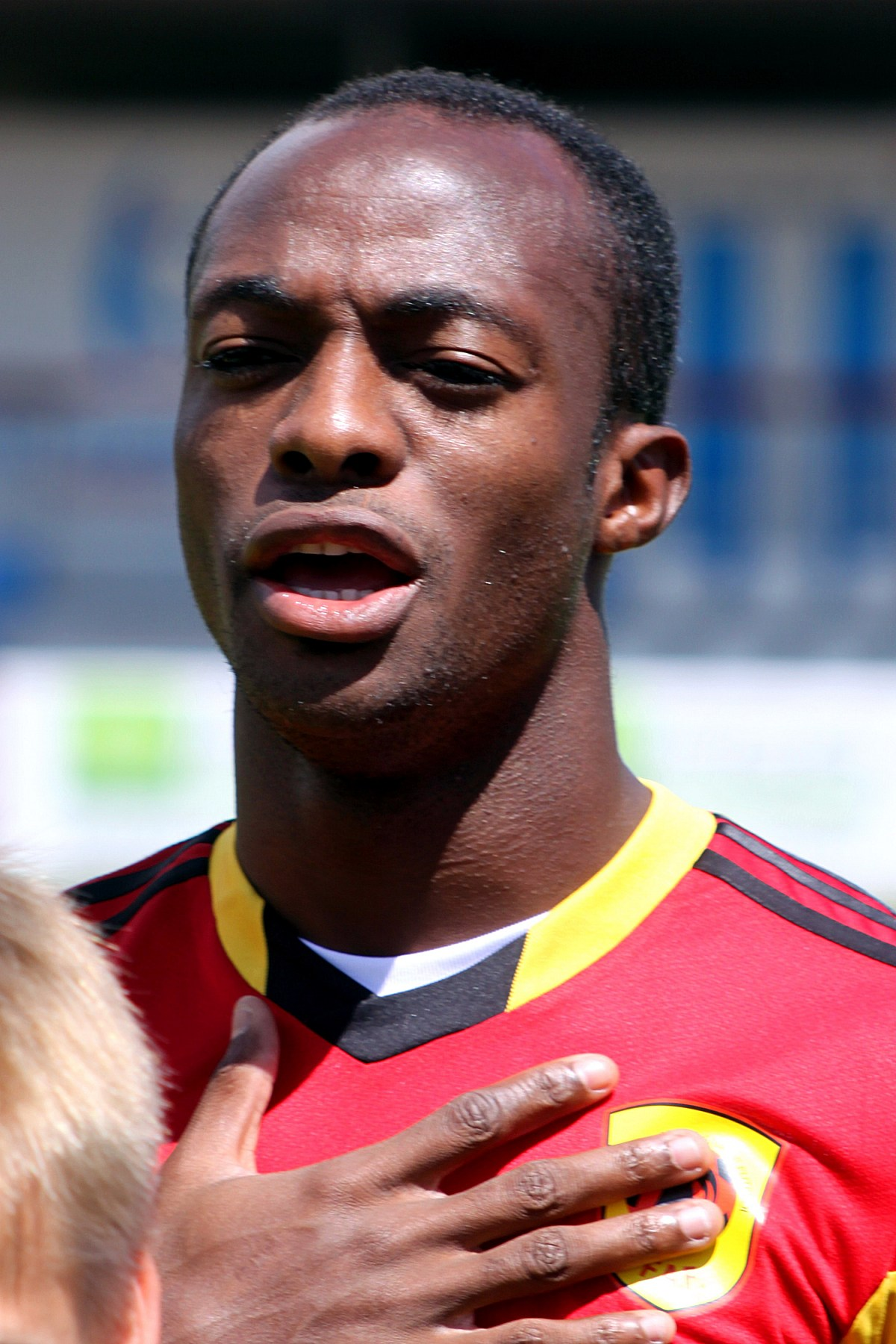
- Geraldo with Angola in 2014

Personal information
- Full name: Hermenegildo da Costa; Paulo Bartolomeu
- Date of birth: 23 November 1991 (age 34)
- Place of birth: Luanda, Angola
- Height: 1.68 m (5 ft 6 in)
- Position: Midfielder

Youth career
- 2009: Norberto de Castro
- 2009: Rio Claro
- 2009: Andraus
- 2010: Coritiba

Senior career*
Years	Team	Apps	(Gls)
2010–2014	Coritiba	68	(5)
2012–2012	→ Paraná Clube (loan)	18	(0)
2015	Red Bull Brasil	0	(0)
2015–2016	Atlético-GO	15	(1)
2016–2019	1º de Agosto	68	(19)
2019–2021	Al Ahly	35	(5)
2021–2022	Ankaragücü	32	(1)
2022–2023	Ümraniyespor	29	(1)
2023–2026	Çorum	60	(9)

International career
2010–	Angola	28	(2)
- * Club domestic league appearances and goals as of 5 May 2026

Hermenegildo da Costa Paulo Bartolomeu (born 23 November 1991), simply known as Geraldo, is an Angolan professional football midfielder.

== Club career ==
=== Early career ===
Born in Luanda, he started his career in 2009, defending Angolan club Norberto de Castro, moving in the same year to Brazilian club Rio Claro, playing in the 2009 Copa São Paulo de Juniores. He joined Andraus of Curitiba after leaving Rio Claro.

=== Coritiba ===
In July 2009, after being observed by head coach René Simões in a friendly game between the reserve squads of Coritiba and Andraus, he was transferred to Coritiba youth team. He joined Coritiba's main squad in 2010, playing his first Série B game on 8 May 2010, at Estádio dos Aflitos, Recife, when his club was defeated 3–1 to Náutico and he came as a substitute for Renatinho. He scored his first Série B goal for Coritiba on 20 November 2010, when he scored a goal against Icasa at Romeirão stadium, thus helping his team win the 2010 edition of the league. Geraldo played his first Série A game on 22 May 2011, when he came up as a substitute for Lucas Mendes in the game against Atlético Goianiense, at Estádio Couto Pereira, won 1–0 by the opponent team.

=== Paraná ===
Geraldo was loaned to Coritiba's fellow Curitiba-based club Paraná on 4 July 2012.

=== D'Agosto ===
Geraldo played 3 seasons for Primeiro de Agosto. Whereas in the first season he may have been overshadowed by the likes of Gelson and Ary Papel, after they moved overseas, he undisputably became the club's biggest asset, finishing all three seasons and the beginning of the 2018–19 with 31 goals, winning 3 league titles and one super cup.

=== Al Ahly ===
In the aftermath of D'Agosto's performance in 2018 where they reached the semi-finals of the Champions League, he signed with Egyptian side Al Ahly SC. He appeared several times on different occasions with Al Ahly in which he surprised, yet he never had a regular basises game time.

=== Ankaragücü ===
In January 2021, Geraldo joined Ankaragücü, after the termination of his contract with Al Ahly.

== International career ==
Geraldo's first game for the Angolan national team was played in Houston, United States, on 13 May 2010, in his country's defeat against Mexico 1–0, when he came as a substitute for Minguito. He played his second game for the Angolan national team on 11 August 2010, when his country was defeated 2–0 by Uruguay at Estádio do Restelo, Lisbon, Portugal. Geraldo played his third game for Angola on 4 September 2010, when his country was defeated 3–0 by Uganda at Mandela National Stadium, Kampala, Uganda. He played his fourth game for his country on 26 March 2011, when his country was defeated 2–1 by Kenya at Kasarani Stadium, Nairobi, Kenya.

Geraldo played three 2013 Africa Cup of Nations games. The first one, against Morocco on 19 January the second one against South Africa on 23 January and the last one on 27 January against Cape Verde, when he came out as a substitute for Gilberto.

== Career statistics ==
Appearances and goals by national team and year
National team	Year	Apps	Goals
Angola	2010	3	0
Angola	2011	1	0
Angola	2012	5	0
Angola	2013	6	0
Angola	2014	1	0
Angola	2015	0	0
Angola	2016	0	0
Angola	2017	1	1
Angola	2018	3	0
Angola	2019	5	1
Total		25	2

Scores and results list Angola's goal tally first, score column indicates score after each Geraldo goal.

List of international goals scored by Geraldo
No.	Date	Venue	Opponent	Score	Result	Competition
1	23 July 2017	Estádio 11 de Novembro, Luanda, Angola	Mauritius	2–1	3–2	2018 African Nations Championship qualification
2	10 September 2019	Estádio 11 de Novembro, Luanda, Angola	Gambia	1–0	2–1	2022 FIFA World Cup qualification

== Honors ==
Coritiba

- Campeonato Brasileiro Série B: 2010
- Campeonato Paranaense: 2010, 2011, 2012, 2013

Al Ahly

- Egyptian Premier League: 2018–19, 2019–20
- Egypt Cup: 2019–20
- Egyptian Super Cup: 2018–19
- CAF Champions League: 2019–20
