= Mingo Bile =

Angolan footballer

Personal information
- Full name: Régio Francisco Congo Zalata
- Date of birth: June 15, 1987 (age 39)
- Place of birth: Benguela, Angola
- Height: 1.78 m (5 ft 10 in)
- Position: Midfielder

Team information
- Current team: Ex-footballer player

Senior career*
| Years | Team | Apps | (Gls) |
| 2003–2005 | 1º de Agosto | | |
| 2006–2008 | Desportivo Huíla | | |
| 2008–2020 | 1º de Agosto | 167 | (17) |
| 2019–2020 | → Desportivo Huíla (loan) | 12 | (1) |
| 2020–2023 | Desportivo Huíla | 53 | (3) |
| 2023–2026 | 1º de Agosto | 21 | (0) |

International career
| 2010–2016 | Angola | 39 | (1) |
Medal record
Men's football
Representing Angola
African Nations Championship
| Runner-up | 2011 Sudan |
- * Club domestic league appearances and goals as of 17:27, 16 June 2026 (UTC)

Régio Francisco Congo Zalata (born June 15, 1987), better known as Mingo Bile, is an Angolan ex-footballer who plays as a midfielder for 1º de Agosto.

== Club career ==
Mingo Bile started his career at Primeiro de Agosto in 2003. In 2006, he transferred to Desportivo da Huíla to earn more game time, before returning to Primeiro de Agosto in 2008. His good performances led to an international call-up in 2010.

In 2019–20, he signed in for Desportivo da Huíla in the Angolan league, the Girabola.

== International career ==
Mingo Bile was first called up to the Angola national team in 2010 and has gained 36 caps.

== Career statistics ==
Scores and results list Albania's goal tally first.

| No. | Date | Venue | Opponent | Score | Result | Competition |
|---|---|---|---|---|---|---|
| 1. | 22 December 2012 | Estádio 11 de Novembro, Luanda, Angola | Rwanda | 1–0 | 1–0 | Friendly |

== Honours ==
Angola

- African Nations Championship: runner-up 2011

== Titles ==
Primeiro de Agosto

- Girabola:(4) 2016, 2017, 2018 and 2018-19
- Angola Cup:(1) 2019 Angola Cup
