= Rambé =

Cape Verdean footballer

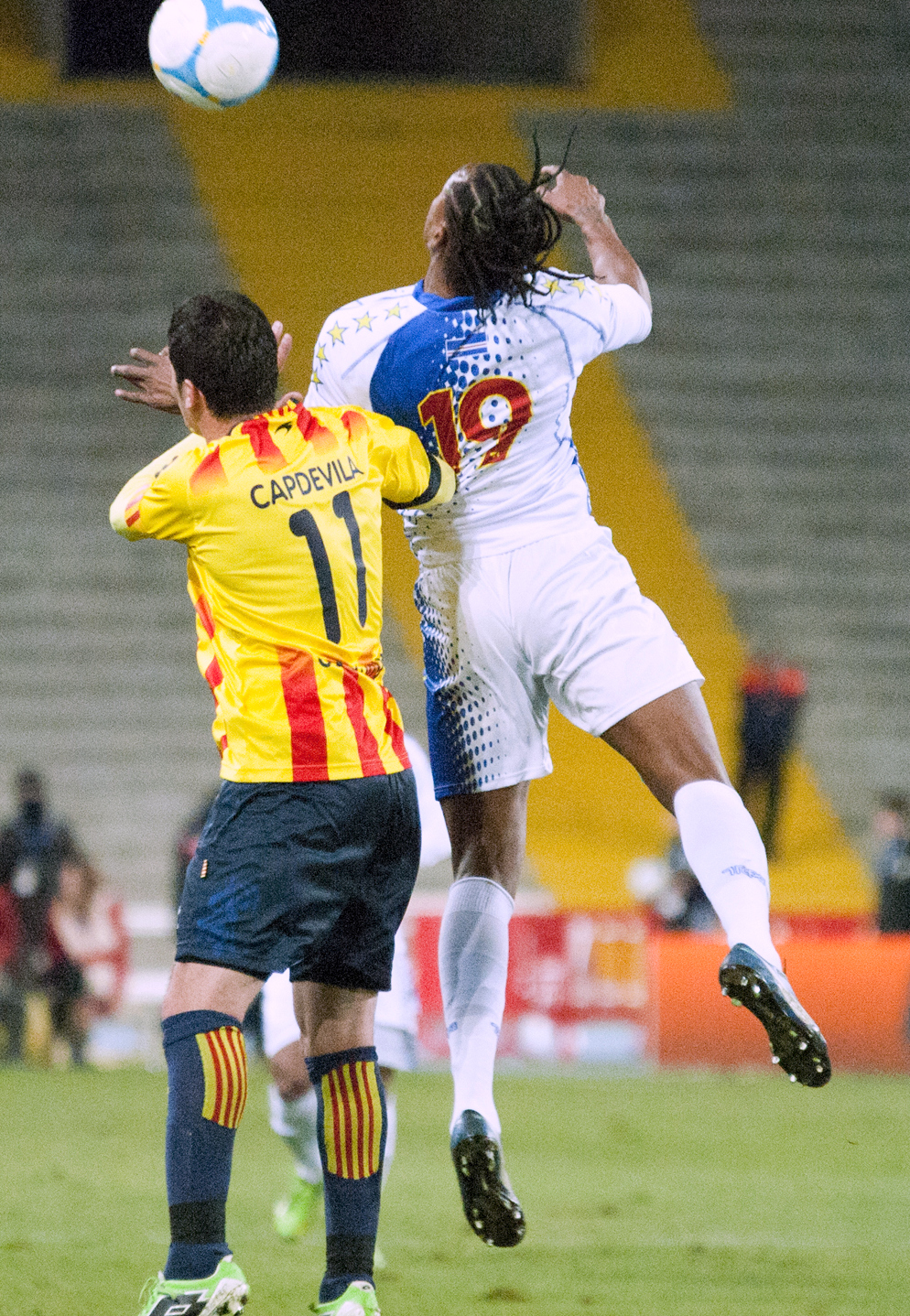
- Rambé (right) in action for Cape Verde

Personal information
- Full name: Ramilton Jorge Santos do Rosário
- Date of birth: 4 October 1989 (age 37)
- Place of birth: São Vicente, Cape Verde
- Height: 1.86 m (6 ft 1 in)
- Position: Striker

Team information
- Current team: Derby São Vicente

Senior career*
| Years | Team | Apps | (Gls) |
| 2008–2009 | Batuque | | |
| 2009–2010 | Mindelense | | |
| 2010–2011 | Macedo Cavaleiros | 30 | (8) |
| 2011–2012 | Pinhalnovense | 30 | (10) |
| 2012–2014 | Belenenses | 26 | (2) |
| 2013–2014 | → Farense (loan) | 15 | (10) |
| 2014–2016 | Braga B | 22 | (4) |
| 2015 | → Vitória Setúbal (loan) | 10 | (1) |
| 2015–2016 | → Farense (loan) | 33 | (7) |
| 2016–2017 | Universitatea Craiova | 12 | (0) |
| 2017 | 1º Agosto | 24 | (11) |
| 2019–2021 | Académica Mindelo | | |
| 2021–2022 | Batuque | | |
| 2022– | Derby São Vicente | | |

International career^{‡}
| 2011–2013 | Cape Verde | 6 | (0) |
- * Club domestic league appearances and goals as of 21 October 2025 ‡ National team caps and goals as of 21 October 2025

Ramilton Jorge Santos do Rosário (born 4 October 1989), known as Rambé, is a Cape Verdean professional footballer who plays for Derby São Vicente as a striker.

== Club career ==
Rambé was born in São Vicente. He started out in his native country with Batuque and Mindelense before moving to Portugal in 2010, where he played one season apiece in the third division with Macedo de Cavaleiros and Pinhalnovense.

In the 2012 off-season, Rambé signed for Belenenses in the second level. He missed the first three months of his first season, due to injury.

In the following years, Rambé alternated between the Portuguese second tier and the Primeira Liga, representing Belenenses, Farense (two spells), Braga B and Vitória de Setúbal. He made his debut in the latter competition on 12 January 2014 whilst at the service of the first club, playing the full 90 minutes in a 0–2 away loss against Arouca, and scored his first during his spell with the latter, contributing to a 1–0 win at Vitória de Guimarães on 14 March 2015.

On 15 July 2016, Rambé moved to Romanian side Universitatea Craiova, joining compatriots Kay and Nuno Rocha. He left in January 2017, signing with 1º de Agosto of the Angolan Girabola the following month.

After two years without a club, Rambé returned to his homeland in September 2019 to sign a one-year contract with Académica do Mindelo.

== International career ==
Rambé made his debut for Cape Verde in 2011. He was named for the squad that appeared at the 2013 Africa Cup of Nations.
