= José Macaia =

Angolan footballer

Personal information
- Full name: José Macaia Ganga
- Date of birth: 24 March 1994 (age 32)
- Place of birth: Cabinda, Angola
- Position: Midfielder

Team information
- Current team: Al-Merrikh SC
- Number: 6

Senior career*
| Years | Team | Apps | (Gls) |
| 2014–2015 | Sporting Cabinda | | |
| 2016 | Benfica Luanda | | |
| 2017–2022 | 1º de Agosto | | |
| 2022-2023 | Al-Merrikh SC | | |
| 2023- | 1° de Agosto | | |

International career^{‡}
| 2018– | Angola | 4 | (0) |
- * Club domestic league appearances and goals ‡ National team caps and goals as of 6 October 2019

José Macaia Ganga best known as Macaia (born March 24, 1994) is an Angolan footballer who plays as a midfielder for Clube Primeiro de Agosto.
