= Diogo Rosado =

Portuguese footballer (born 1990)

Personal information
- Full name: Diogo Jorge Rosado
- Date of birth: 21 February 1990 (age 36)
- Place of birth: Peniche, Portugal
- Height: 1.85 m (6 ft 1 in)
- Position: Midfielder

Team information
- Current team: Vilaverdense

Youth career
- 1998–2002: Peniche
- 2002–2003: Sporting CP
- 2003–2004: Peniche
- 2004–2009: Sporting CP

Senior career*
Years	Team	Apps	(Gls)
2009–2012	Sporting CP	0	(0)
2009–2010	→ Real Massamá (loan)	15	(1)
2010–2011	→ Penafiel (loan)	8	(0)
2011–2012	→ Feirense (loan)	17	(2)
2012–2013	Blackburn Rovers	2	(0)
2013	→ Benfica B (loan)	12	(4)
2013–2014	Vitória Setúbal	10	(0)
2014	Arles-Avignon	4	(0)
2015	Paços Ferreira	5	(0)
2016	Ermis	13	(0)
2016	Progresso		
2017	1º Agosto		
2018	Gaz Metan Mediaș	14	(1)
2019	Farul Constanța	10	(1)
2020–2021	Concordia Chiajna	19	(0)
2021–2022	Leça	22	(2)
2022–2024	Lusitânia	61	(7)
2024–2025	Marco 09	28	(8)
2025	Salgueiros	10	(1)
2026–	Vilaverdense	3	(0)

International career
2006–2007	Portugal U17	11	(1)
2007	Portugal U18	3	(1)
2007–2009	Portugal U19	24	(2)
2010	Portugal U20	2	(0)
2011–2012	Portugal U21	6	(0)
- * Club domestic league appearances and goals as of 10:04, 26 January 2026 (UTC)

Diogo Jorge Rosado (born 21 February 1990) is a Portuguese professional footballer who plays as a midfielder for Campeonato de Portugal club Vilaverdense.

Developed at Sporting CP, he made 32 Primeira Liga appearances with Feirense, Vitória de Setúbal and Paços de Ferreira, as well as 20 in the second tier for Penafiel and Benfica B. He spent much of his career abroad, in brief spells in England, France, Cyprus, Angola and Romania.

== Club career ==
=== Sporting CP ===
Rosado was born in Peniche, Leiria District. A product of Sporting CP's prolific youth system, he made his professional debut in the 2009–10 season, being loaned to Lisbon neighbours Real Massamá in Massamá as the third division side was coached by Filipe Ramos – a former Sporting player.

Still owned by the Lions, Rosado moved to Feirense for 2011–12, making his Primeira Liga debut on 14 August in a 0–0 home draw against Nacional (two minutes played). He eventually started in 12 of his league appearances and scored twice, as the campaign ended in relegation.

=== Blackburn Rovers ===
On 31 August 2012, Rosado signed for Blackburn Rovers of the Football League Championship, on a three-year deal. On 31 January of the following year, however, he was loaned to Benfica B until June, with the option to make the move permanent.

=== Vitória de Setúbal ===
On 23 August 2013, Rosado had his contract at Blackburn terminated by mutual consent. He returned to his country shortly after, and agreed to a two-year deal at Vitória de Setúbal in the top tier.

=== Later years ===
Subsequently, Rosado rarely settled with a club, representing in quick succession Arles-Avignon (France), Paços de Ferreira, Ermis Aradippou (Cypriot First Division), and Progresso and Primeiro de Agosto (both in the Angolan Girabola).

Rosado moved to Gaz Metan Mediaș of the Romanian Liga II in January 2018. On 7 February the following year, he signed a contract with Farul Constanța alongside compatriots João Diogo and Pedro Celestino. He was one of 13 acquisitions by Concordia Chiajna of the same league in the winter 2020 transfer window.

In 2021, Rosado returned to domestic football for the first time in six years, at Leça in the fourth division. He scored the only goal on 20 November as they won at home to top-flight Gil Vicente in the fourth round of the Taça de Portugal.

== International career ==
All youth levels comprised, Rosado won 46 caps for Portugal and scored four goals. He made his debut for the under-21 side on 9 August 2011, starting and being replaced during the second half of the 1–1 friendly draw with Slovakia.

== Career statistics ==
As of 2 January 2016

Appearances and goals by club, season and competition
Club	Season	League			Cup		Continental		Total	
Club	Season	Division	Apps	Goals	Apps	Goals	Apps	Goals	Apps	Goals
Sporting CP	2008–09	Primeira Liga	0	0	0	0	—		0	0
Real Massamá (loan)	2009–10	Segunda Divisão	15	1	2	1	—		17	2
Penafiel (loan)	2010–11	Segunda Liga	8	0	1	0	—		9	0
Feirense (loan)	2011–12	Primeira Liga	17	2	2	0	—		19	2
Blackburn Rovers	2012–13	Championship	2	0	1	0	—		3	0
Benfica B (loan)	2012–13	Segunda Liga	12	4	—		—		12	4
Vitória Setúbal	2013–14	Primeira Liga	10	0	5	0	—		15	0
Arles-Avignon	2014–15	Ligue 2	4	0	0	0	—		4	0
Paços Ferreira	2014–15	Primeira Liga	5	0	0	0	—		5	0
Career total			73	7	11	1	0	0	84	8

== Honours ==
1º de Agosto

- Girabola: 2017
