= Nelson da Luz =

Angolan footballer (born 1998)

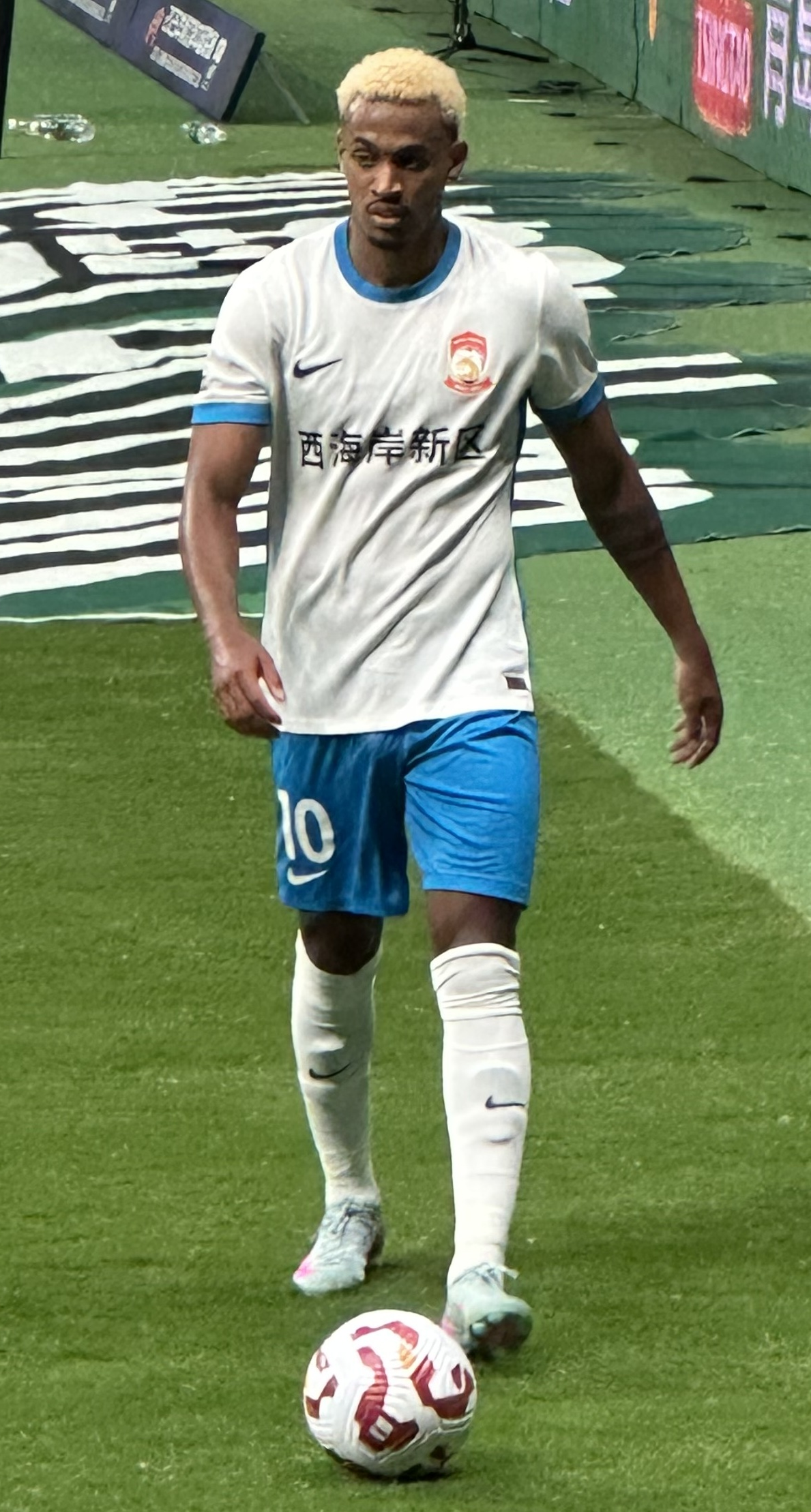
- da Luz with Qingdao West Coast in 2025

Personal information
- Full name: Nelson Conceição da Luz
- Date of birth: 4 February 1998 (age 28)
- Place of birth: Luanda, Angola
- Height: 1.83 m (6 ft 0 in)
- Position: Winger

Team information
- Current team: Qingdao West Coast
- Number: 10

Youth career
- 1º de Agosto

Senior career*
Years	Team	Apps	(Gls)
2016–2020	1º de Agosto	62	(7)
2020–2021	Vitória de Guimarães B	19	(1)
2020–	Vitória de Guimarães	56	(7)
2024	→ Qingdao West Coast (loan)	25	(5)
2025–	Qingdao West Coast	55	(13)

International career^{‡}
- Angola U17
2016	Angola U20	5	(1)
2016–	Angola	12	(0)
- * Club domestic league appearances and goals as of 8 November 2026 ‡ National team caps and goals as of 5 June 2022

Nelson Conceição da Luz (born 4 February 1998) is an Angolan professional footballer who plays as a winger for Chinese Super League club Qingdao West Coast.

== Club career ==
In September 2020, da Luz signed for Portuguese Primeira Liga club Vitória de Guimarães.

On 20 January 2024, Vitória de Guimarães sent da Luz on a one-year loan with an option-to-buy to Qingdao West Coast, who had just been promoted to the Chinese Super League club .

== International career ==
At the youth international level he played in 2015 African U-17 Championship qualification and the 2016 COSAFA U-20 Cup.

== Career statistics ==
=== Club ===
As of match played 8 November 2026

Appearances and goals by club, season and competition
Club	Season	League			National cup		League cup		Continental		Other		Total	
Club	Season	Division	Apps	Goals	Apps	Goals	Apps	Goals	Apps	Goals	Apps	Goals	Apps	Goals
1º de Agosto	2016	Girabola	8	0	0	0	—		—		—		8	0
1º de Agosto	2017	Girabola	23	3	5	1	—		2 (Note: Appearances in CAF Champions League)	0	1 (Note: Appearance in Supertaça de Angola)	0	31	4
1º de Agosto	2018	Girabola	3	0	—		—		3	0	—		6	0
1º de Agosto	2018–19	Girabola	15	2	2	0	—		0	0	—		17	2
1º de Agosto	2019–20	Girabola	13	2	2	0	—		6	0	1	0	22	2
1º de Agosto	Total		62	7	9	1	—		11	0	2	0	84	8
Vitória Guimarães B	2020–21	Campeonato de Portugal	7	0	—		—		—		—		7	0
Vitória Guimarães B	2021–22	Liga 3	12	1	—		—		—		—		12	1
Vitória Guimarães B	Total		19	1	—		—		—		—		19	1
Vitória Guimarães	2021–22	Primeira Liga	12	3	0	0	0	0	—		—		12	3
Vitória Guimarães	2022–23	Primeira Liga	29	3	2	0	2	0	4 (Note: Appearance(s) in UEFA Europa Conference League)	0	—		37	3
Vitória Guimarães	2023–24	Primeira Liga	15	1	2	0	1	0	1	0	—		19	1
Vitória Guimarães	Total		56	7	4	0	3	0	5	0	—		68	7
Qingdao West Coast (loan)	2024	Chinese Super League	25	5	0	0	—		—		—		25	5
Qingdao West Coast	2025	Chinese Super League	27	5	1	0	—		—		—		28	5
Qingdao West Coast	2026	Chinese Super League	28	8	1	0	—		—		—		29	8
Qingdao West Coast	Qingdao total		80	18	2	0	—		—		—		82	18
Career total			217	33	15	1	3	0	16	0	2	0	253	34

=== International ===
As of matches played 5 June 2022

National team	Year	Apps	Goals
Angola	2016	2	0
Angola	2017	7	0
Angola	2018	3	0
Total		12	0
