= 11 November Stadium =

Multi-use stadium in Camama, Luanda, Angola

Coordinates: 8°58′11″S 13°17′1″E

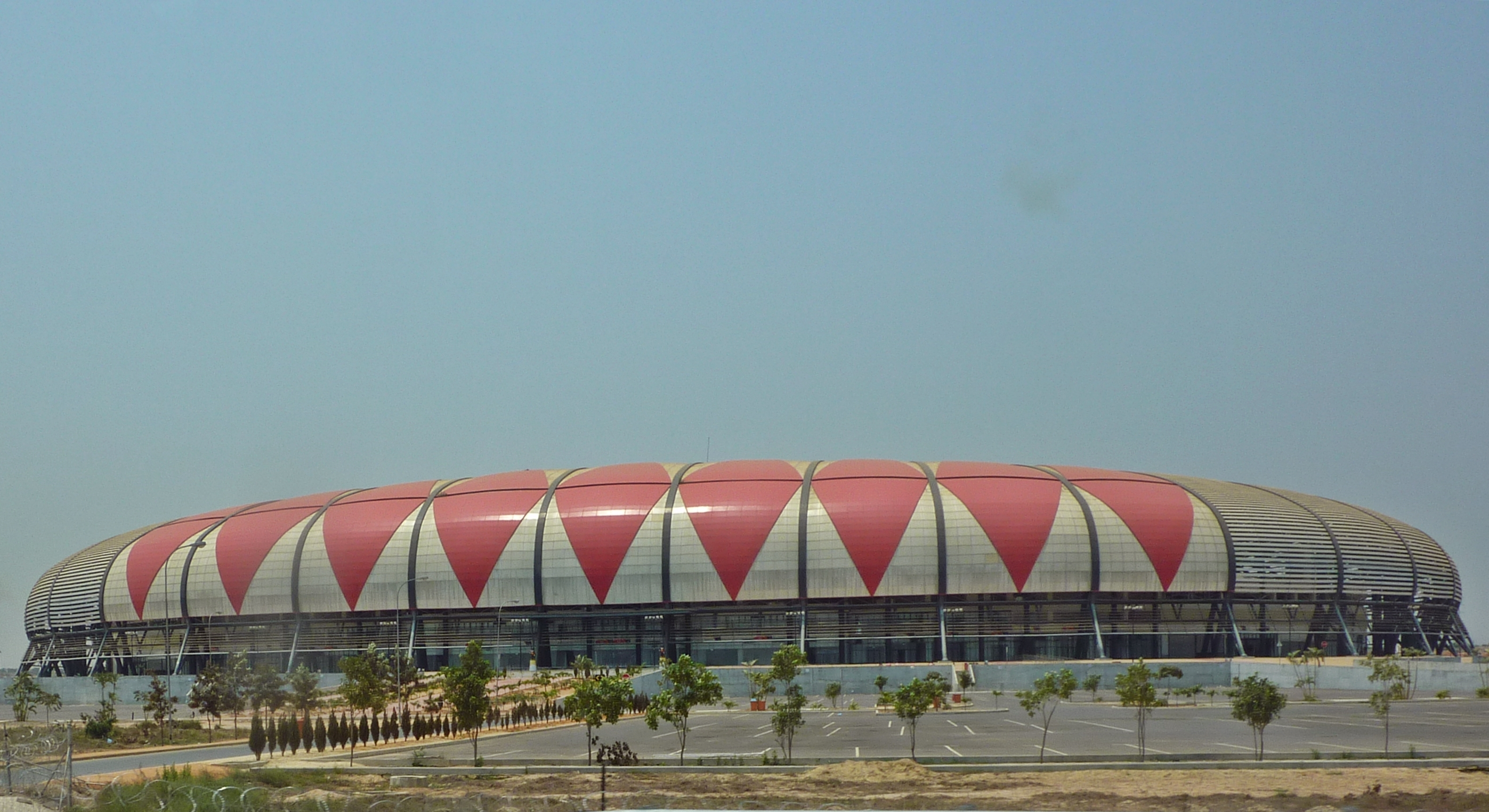
- Interactive map of 11 November Stadium
- Full name: Estádio Nacional 11 de Novembro
- Location: Talatona, Angola
- Capacity: 48,500
- Surface: Grass
- Scoreboard: Electronic
- Field size: 105m x 68m

Construction
- Built: 23 February 2008; 18 years ago
- Opened: 27 December 2009; 16 years ago
- Main contractor: Shanghai Construction Group

Tenants
- Petro de Luanda; Angola national football team

The 11 November Stadium or Estádio Nacional 11 de Novembro is a multi-use stadium in Talatona (near Luanda), Angola. Completed in 2010 ahead of the 2010 Africa Cup of Nations, it hosted nine matches during the tournament, including five Group A matches, one Group B match, one quarter final, one semi-final, and the final. Its estimated cost is around 227 million US dollars.

== Overview ==
It is currently used on a regular basis by football clubs Primeiro de Agosto, Petro de Luanda and Benfica de Luanda who play in Girabola. Its capacity is 48,000.

The stadium is named after the date of Angola's independence.

The stadium is located in Talatona municipality at the Expressway surrounding Luanda on the road side.

== 1º de Agosto vs TP Mazembe post-match incident ==
Five people were reportedly killed after the 45,000 capacity crowd match on Saturday 15 September 2018, including two children who were trampled and/or suffocated to death while exiting the stadium. Before the match began, supporters called a radio station urging the organization to open all gates after the match ended for fear of a tragedy and after going through similar ordeals in the past. The Angolan Ministry of Youth and Sports said it regretted the incident, expressed condolences to the relatives and vowed to launch an investigation. The club's management promised to assist the relatives in funeral expenses.

Preceded by Ohene Djan Stadium; Accra	Africa Cup of Nations; Final Venue; 2010	Succeeded by Stade d'Angondjé; Libreville
