= 2020–21 CAF Confederation Cup qualifying rounds =

- Dates: 27 November 2020 – 21 February 2021

Tournament statistics
- Matches played: 92
- Goals scored: 207 (2.25 per match)

The 2020–21 CAF Confederation Cup qualifying rounds were played from 27 November 2020 to 21 February 2021. A total of 67 teams competed in the international football qualifying rounds to decide the 16 places in the group stage of the 2020–21 CAF Confederation Cup.

== Draw ==
The draw for the qualifying rounds was held on 9 November 2020 at the CAF headquarters in Cairo, Egypt.

The entry round of the 51 teams entered into the draw was determined by their performances in the CAF competitions for the previous five seasons (CAF 5-year ranking points shown in parentheses).

Entry round	First round (13 teams)	Preliminary round (38 teams)
Teams	(Morocco) RS Berkane (47 pts); (Tunisia) Étoile du Sahel (47 pts); (Egypt) Pyramids (20 pts); (Algeria) ES Sétif (12 pts); (Algeria) JS Kabylie (10 pts); (South Africa) Orlando Pirates (8 pts); (Uganda) KCCA (8 pts); (Libya) Al Ahli Tripoli (6.5 pts); (Democratic Republic of the Congo) DC Motema Pembe (5 pts); (Sudan) El Hilal El Obeid (4 pts); (Mozambique) UD Songo (3 pts); (Benin) ESAE (2.5 pts); (Ivory Coast) FC San Pédro (2.5 pts)	(Burkina Faso) Salitas (2 pts); (Cameroon) Coton Sport (2 pts); (Nigeria) Rivers United (1 pt); (Angola) Bravos do Maquis; (Angola) Sagrada Esperança; (Botswana) Orapa United; (Burundi) Musongati; (Chad) Renaissance; (Comoros) Ngazi Sport; (Republic of the Congo) Étoile du Congo; (Democratic Republic of the Congo) AS Maniema Union; (Djibouti) Arta/Solar7; (Egypt) Al Mokawloon Al Arab; (Equatorial Guinea) Futuro Kings; (Eswatini) ~~Mbabane Swallows~~; (Ethiopia) Fasil Kenema; (The Gambia) GAMTEL; (Ghana) Ashanti Gold; (Guinea) AS Kaloum Star; (Guinea) CI Kamsar; (Libya) Al Ittihad; (Mali) Yeelen Olympique; (Mauritania) Tevragh-Zeina; (Morocco) TAS Casablanca; (Niger) USGN; (Nigeria) Kano Pillars; (Rwanda) AS Kigali; (Senegal) ASC Jaraaf; (Somalia) Horseed; (South Africa) Bloemfontein Celtic; (South Sudan) Al Rabita; (Sudan) Al Amal Atbara; (Tanzania) Namungo; (Togo) UFC Sokodé; (Tunisia) US Monastir; (Zambia) Green Eagles; (Zambia) NAPSA Stars; (Zanzibar) KVZ

== Format ==
In the qualifying rounds, each tie will be played on a home-and-away two-legged basis. If the aggregate score is tied after the second leg, the away goals rule will be applied, and if still tied, extra time will not be played, and the penalty shoot-out will be used to determine the winner (Regulations III. 13 & 14).

== Schedule ==
The schedule of the competition is as follows.

Round	First leg	Second leg
Preliminary round	27–29 November 2020	4–6 December 2020
First round	22–23 December 2020	5–6 January 2021
Play-off round	14 February 2021	21 February 2021

== Bracket ==
The bracket of the draw was announced by the CAF on 9 November 2020. The 16 winners of the first round advance to the play-off round, where they will be joined by the 16 losers of the Champions League first round.

Preliminary round
1	(Guinea) AS Kaloum Star	1	0	1
4	(Mauritania) Tevragh-Zeina	1	1	2
3	(Morocco) RS Berkane	Bye
2

First round
(Mauritania) Tevragh-Zeina	0	0	0
(Morocco) RS Berkane	0	2	2

Preliminary round
1	(Guinea) CI Kamsar	0	0	0
4	(Chad) Renaissance	0	1	1
3	(Algeria) ES Sétif	Bye
2

First round
(Chad) Renaissance	—	—
(Algeria) ES Sétif	—	—	w/o

Preliminary round
1	(Mali) Yeelen Olympique	0	1	1
4	(Niger) USGN	1	1	2
3	(Algeria) JS Kabylie	Bye
2

First round
(Niger) USGN	1	0	1
(Algeria) JS Kabylie	2	2	4

Preliminary round
1	(The Gambia) GAMTEL	0	—
4	(Morocco) TAS Casablanca	1	—	w/o
3	(Benin) ESAE	Bye
2

First round
(Morocco) TAS Casablanca	4	1	5
(Benin) ESAE	0	1	1

Preliminary round
1	(Senegal) ASC Jaraaf	3	0	3
4	(Nigeria) Kano Pillars	1	0	1
3	(Ivory Coast) FC San Pédro	Bye
2

First round
(Senegal) ASC Jaraaf (a)	0	2	2
(Ivory Coast) FC San Pédro	1	1	1

Preliminary round
1	(Djibouti) Arta/Solar7	0	1	1
4	(Egypt) Al Mokawloon Al Arab	1	9	10
3	(Tunisia) Étoile du Sahel	Bye
2

First round
(Egypt) Al Mokawloon Al Arab	0	1	1
(Tunisia) Étoile du Sahel	0	2	2

Preliminary round
1	(Libya) Al Ittihad	4	3	7
4	(Somalia) Horseed	1	0	1
3	(Egypt) Pyramids	Bye
2

First round
(Libya) Al Ittihad	0	2	2
(Egypt) Pyramids	1	3	4

Preliminary round
1	(Tunisia) US Monastir	2	1	3
4	(Ethiopia) Fasil Kenema	0	2	2
3	(Libya) Al Ahli Tripoli	Bye
2

First round
(Tunisia) US Monastir	2	0	2
(Libya) Al Ahli Tripoli	0	0	0

Preliminary round
1	(Tanzania) Namungo	3	—	w/o
4	(South Sudan) Al Rabita	0	—
3	(Sudan) El Hilal El Obeid	Bye
2

First round
(Tanzania) Namungo	2	3	5
(Sudan) El Hilal El Obeid	0	3	3

Preliminary round
1	(Angola) Sagrada Esperança	—	—	w/o
4	(Eswatini) Mbabane Swallows	—	—
3	(South Africa) Orlando Pirates	Bye
2

First round
(Angola) Sagrada Esperança	0	—
(South Africa) Orlando Pirates	1	—	w/o

Preliminary round
1	(Botswana) Orapa United	2	0	2
4	(Rwanda) AS Kigali (a)	1	1	2
3	(Uganda) KCCA	Bye
2

First round
(Rwanda) AS Kigali (a)	2 (awd.)	1	3
(Uganda) KCCA	0	3	3

Preliminary round
1	(Comoros) Ngazi Sport	1	1	2
4	(Zambia) NAPSA Stars	5	4	9
3	(Mozambique) UD Songo	Bye
2

First round
(Zambia) NAPSA Stars (a)	0	1	1
(Mozambique) UD Songo	0	1	1

Preliminary round
1	(Republic of the Congo) Étoile du Congo	1	0	1
4	(Angola) Bravos do Maquis (a)	1	0	1
3	(Democratic Republic of the Congo) DC Motema Pembe	Bye
2

First round
(Angola) Bravos do Maquis	0	1	1
(Democratic Republic of the Congo) DC Motema Pembe	1	2	3

Preliminary round
1	(Sudan) Al Amal Atbara	1	3	4
4	(Zanzibar) KVZ	0	0	0
3	(Ghana) Ashanti Gold	0	1	1
2	(Burkina Faso) Salitas	0	2	2

First round
(Sudan) Al Amal Atbara	0	0	0
(Burkina Faso) Salitas	1	2	3

Preliminary round
1	(Burundi) Musongati	2	1	3
4	(Zambia) Green Eagles	2	2	4
3	(Togo) UFC Sokodé	0	1	1
2	(Cameroon) Coton Sport	2	0	2

First round
(Zambia) Green Eagles	0	0	0
(Cameroon) Coton Sport	2	1	3

Preliminary round
1	(Democratic Republic of the Congo) AS Maniema Union	0	2	0 (2)
4	(South Africa) Bloemfontein Celtic (p)	2	0	2 (3)
3	(Equatorial Guinea) Futuro Kings	2	1	3 (0)
2	(Nigeria) Rivers United (p)	1	2	3 (2)

First round
(South Africa) Bloemfontein Celtic	0	0	0
(Nigeria) Rivers United	2	3	5

== Preliminary round ==
The preliminary round, also called the first preliminary round, includes the 38 teams that did not receive byes to the first round.

Team 1	Agg.	Team 2	1st leg	2nd leg
AS Kaloum Star (Guinea)	1–2	(Mauritania) Tevragh-Zeina	1–1	0–1
CI Kamsar (Guinea)	0–1	(Chad) Renaissance	0–0	0–1
Yeelen Olympique (Mali)	1–2	(Niger) USGN	0–1	1–1
GAMTEL (The Gambia)	w/o (Note: TAS Casablanca won on a walkover after GAMTEL withdrew from the second leg in Morocco citing financial constraints.)	(Morocco) TAS Casablanca	0–1	—
ASC Jaraaf (Senegal)	3–1	(Nigeria) Kano Pillars	3–1	0–0
Arta/Solar7 (Djibouti)	1–10	(Egypt) Al Mokawloon Al Arab	0–1	1–9
Al Ittihad (Libya)	7–1	(Somalia) Horseed	4–1	3–0
US Monastir (Tunisia)	3–2	(Ethiopia) Fasil Kenema	2–0	1–2
Namungo (Tanzania)	w/o (Note: Namungo won on walkover after Al Rabita were disqualified by CAF due to violation of regulations from the club and the South Sudan Football Association.)	(South Sudan) Al Rabita	3–0	—
Sagrada Esperança (Angola)	w/o (Note: Sagrada Esperança won on walkover after the Eswatini Football Association was not able to confirm the engagement of their representative in the CAF Confederation Cup by the CAF deadline.)	(Eswatini) Mbabane Swallows	—	—
Orapa United (Botswana)	2–2 (a)	(Rwanda) AS Kigali	2–1	0–1
Ngazi Sport (Comoros)	2–9	(Zambia) NAPSA Stars	1–5	1–4
Étoile du Congo (Republic of the Congo)	1–1 (a)	(Angola) Bravos do Maquis	1–1	0–0
Al Amal Atbara (Sudan)	4–0	(Zanzibar) KVZ	1–0	3–0
Ashanti Gold (Ghana)	1–2	(Burkina Faso) Salitas	0–0	1–2
Musongati (Burundi)	3–4	(Zambia) Green Eagles	2–2	1–2
UFC Sokodé (Togo)	1–2	(Cameroon) Coton Sport	0–2	1–0
AS Maniema Union (Democratic Republic of the Congo)	2–2 (2–3 p)	(South Africa) Bloemfontein Celtic	0–2	2–0
Futuro Kings (Equatorial Guinea)	3–3 (0–2 p)	(Nigeria) Rivers United	2–1	1–2

Notes:

28 November 2020
16:30 UTC+0

AS Kaloum Star (Guinea)	1–1	(Mauritania) Tevragh-Zeina
Fofana 10'	Report	Bagayoko 5'

Stade du 28 Septembre, Conakry
Referee: Baboucarr Bass (Gambia)
6 December 2020
16:00 UTC+0

Tevragh-Zeina (Mauritania)	1–0	(Guinea) AS Kaloum Star
Hattab 38'	Report

Stade Cheikha Ould Boïdiya, Nouakchott
Referee: Abdoulaye Sissoko (Mali)

Tevragh-Zeina won 2–1 on aggregate.

27 November 2020
16:30 UTC+0

CI Kamsar (Guinea)	0–0	(Chad) Renaissance
	Report

Stade du 28 Septembre, Conakry
Referee: El Hadji Amadou Sy (Senegal)
6 December 2020
15:00 UTC+1

Renaissance (Chad)	1–0	(Guinea) CI Kamsar
Harouna 45' (pen.)	Report

Stade Omnisports Idriss Mahamat Ouya, N'Djamena
Referee: Nve Esimi (Equatorial Guinea)

Renaissance won 1–0 on aggregate.

29 November 2020
16:00 UTC+0

Yeelen Olympique (Mali)	0–1	(Niger) USGN
	Report	Hinsa 48' (pen.)

Stade du 26 Mars, Bamako
Referee: Fabricio Duarte (Cape Verde)
5 December 2020
15:30 UTC+1

USGN (Niger)	1–1	(Mali) Yeelen Olympique
Ogbonna 10'	Report	Diabaté 33' (pen.)

Stade Général Seyni Kountché, Niamey
Referee: Daniel Luc Kassa (Benin)

USGN won 2–1 on aggregate.

28 November 2020
17:00 UTC+0

GAMTEL (The Gambia)	0–1	(Morocco) TAS Casablanca
	Report	Raiani 82'

Independence Stadium, Bakau
Referee: Babacar Sarr (Mauritania)
5 December 2020
20:00 UTC+1

TAS Casablanca (Morocco)	Cancelled	(The Gambia) GAMTEL
	Report

Stade Mohammed V, Casablanca

TAS Casablanca won on walkover after GAMTEL withdrew from the second leg in Morocco citing financial constraints.

28 November 2020
17:00 UTC+0

ASC Jaraaf (Senegal)	3–1	(Nigeria) Kano Pillars
Mbodj 18'; Sambou 38'; N'Diaye 76'	Report	Muhammad 12'

Stade Lat-Dior, Thiès
Referee: Bangaly Konate (Guinea)
5 December 2020
16:00 UTC+1

Kano Pillars (Nigeria)	0–0	(Senegal) ASC Jaraaf
	Report

Ahmadu Bello Stadium, Kaduna
Referee: Hamidou Diero (Burkina Faso)

ASC Jaraaf won 3–1 on aggregate.

28 November 2020
17:00 UTC+3

Arta/Solar7 (Djibouti)	0–1	(Egypt) Al Mokawloon Al Arab
	Report	Song 19' (o.g.)

El Hadj Hassan Gouled Aptidon Stadium, Djibouti City
Referee: Lemma Nigussie (Ethiopia)
4 December 2020
20:00 UTC+2

Al Mokawloon Al Arab (Egypt)	9–1	(Djibouti) Arta/Solar7
Dawouda 2', 35'; Jaziri 8', 10'; Kabore 21'; Essam 51' (pen.); Nagah 67'; El Shimi 72'; Mostafa 89'	Report	Dadzie 80'

Osman Ahmed Osman Stadium, Cairo
Referee: Abdulwahid Huraywidah (Libya)

Al Mokawloon Al Arab won 10–1 on aggregate.

28 November 2020
18:00 UTC+2

Al Ittihad (Libya)	4–1	(Somalia) Horseed
Mohammed 44', 70'; Al Shadi 53'; Salih 64'	Report	Oyoo 18'

Al Salam Stadium, Cairo (Egypt) (Note: Teams from Libya play their home matches outside the country due to security concerns from the ongoing civil war.)
Referee: Mehrez Melki (Tunisia)
6 December 2020
15:00 UTC+2

Horseed (Somalia)	0–3	(Libya) Al Ittihad
	Report	Zubya 1'; Aijbali 56'; Salih 83'

Al Salam Stadium, Cairo (Egypt) (Note: Teams from Somalia played their home matches outside the country due to security concerns from the ongoing civil war.)
Referee: Mfaume Ali Nassoro (Tanzania)

Al Ittihad won 7–1 on aggregate.

27 November 2020
19:00 UTC+1

US Monastir (Tunisia)	2–0	(Ethiopia) Fasil Kenema
Amri 2'; Ben Romdhane 56'	Report

Stade Mustapha Ben Jannet, Monastir
Referee: Karim Sabry (Morocco)
6 December 2020
16:00 UTC+3

Fasil Kenema (Ethiopia)	2–1	(Tunisia) US Monastir
Dagnachew 28'; Kassim 50'	Report	Arfaoui 85'

Addis Ababa Stadium, Addis Ababa
Referee: Samuel Uwikunda (Rwanda)

US Monastir won 3–2 on aggregate.

28 November 2020
19:00 UTC+3

Namungo (Tanzania)	3–0	(South Sudan) Al Rabita
Sey 20', 38'; Kichuya 61'	Report

Chamazi Stadium, Dar es Salaam
Referee: Alex Nsulumbi (Uganda)
6 December 2020
18:00 UTC+3

Al Rabita (South Sudan)	Cancelled	(Tanzania) Namungo
	Report

Chamazi Stadium, Dar es Salaam (Tanzania) (Note: Teams from South Sudan played their home matches outside the country due to renovation of Juba Stadium.)

Namungo won on walkover after Al Rabita were disqualified by CAF due to violation of regulations from the club and the South Sudan Football Association.

29 November 2020
15:30 UTC+2

Orapa United (Botswana)	2–1	(Rwanda) AS Kigali
Mabaya 13'; Elias 20'	Report	Lawal 58'

National Stadium, Gaborone
Referee: Thando Ndzandzeka (South Africa)
6 December 2020
15:00 UTC+2

AS Kigali (Rwanda)	1–0	(Botswana) Orapa United
Lawal 89'	Report

Nyamirambo Regional Stadium, Kigali
Referee: Haileyesus Bazezew (Ethiopia)

2–2 on aggregate. AS Kigali won on away goals.

29 November 2020
15:00 UTC+3

Ngazi Sport (Comoros)	1–5	(Zambia) NAPSA Stars
Raharinjatovo 87'	Report	Otieno 6'; Silavwe 61', 64'; Mayuka 75'; Ngulube 90+2'

Stade de Moroni, Moroni
Referee: Abdoul Ohabee Kanoso (Madagascar)
5 December 2020
15:00 UTC+2

NAPSA Stars (Zambia)	4–1	(Comoros) Ngazi Sport
Mayuka 29'; Ngulube 45'; Adoko 70'; Mushili 72'	Report	Batomanga 35' (pen.)

National Heroes Stadium, Lusaka
Referee: Brighton Chimene (Zimbabwe)

NAPSA Stars won 9–2 on aggregate.

28 November 2020
15:30 UTC+1

Étoile du Congo (Republic of the Congo)	1–1	(Angola) Bravos do Maquis
Babélé 63'	Report	Dabanda 53'

Stade Alphonse Massemba-Débat, Brazzaville
Referee: Tanguy Lopembe Tangi (DR Congo)
6 December 2020
15:00 UTC+1

Bravos do Maquis (Angola)	0–0	(Republic of the Congo) Étoile du Congo
	Report

Estádio dos Coqueiros, Luanda
Referee: Gift Chicco (Malawi)

1–1 on aggregate. Bravos do Maquis won on away goals.

27 November 2020
15:00 UTC+2

Al Amal Atbara (Sudan)	1–0	(Zanzibar) KVZ
Bashir 12'	Report

Al Hilal Stadium, Omdurman
Referee: Jean Claude Ishimwe (Rwanda)
5 December 2020
19:00 UTC+3

KVZ (Zanzibar)	0–3	(Sudan) Al Amal Atbara
	Report	Salim 27'; Mohamed 30'; Akech 58'

Amaan Stadium, Zanzibar City
Referee: Djaffari Nduwimana (Burundi)

Al Amal Atbara won 4–0 on aggregate.

29 November 2020
15:00 UTC+0

Ashanti Gold (Ghana)	0–0	(Burkina Faso) Salitas
	Report

Len Clay Stadium, Obuasi
Referee: Issa Mouhamed (Benin)
5 December 2020
18:00 UTC+0

Salitas (Burkina Faso)	2–1	(Ghana) Ashanti Gold
Boissy 12', 44'	Report	Abagna 45'

Stade du 4 Août, Ouagadougou
Referee: Abubakar Abdullahi (Nigeria)

Salitas won 2–1 on aggregate.

28 November 2020
15:00 UTC+2

Musongati (Burundi)	2–2	(Zambia) Green Eagles
Nibibona 24'; Ndizeye 68'	Report	Mwikisa 32'; Silwimba 42'

Intwari Stadium, Bujumbura
Referee: Elly Sasii (Tanzania)
6 December 2020
15:00 UTC+2

Green Eagles (Zambia)	2–1	(Burundi) Musongati
Mwikisa 39'; Kanema 52'	Report	Ndizeye 10'

Nkoloma Stadium, Lusaka
Referee: Thulani Sibandze (Eswatini)

Green Eagles won 4–3 on aggregate.

29 November 2020
15:30 UTC+0

UFC Sokodé (Togo)	0–2	(Cameroon) Coton Sport
	Report	Marou 34'; Araina 49'

Stade de Kégué, Lomé
Referee: Ali Mahaman (Niger)
6 December 2020
15:30 UTC+1

Coton Sport (Cameroon)	0–1	(Togo) UFC Sokodé
	Report	Ouro-Ayeva 46'

Roumdé Adjia Stadium, Garoua
Referee: Pousri Alfred (Chad)

Coton Sport won 2–1 on aggregate.

29 November 2020
15:00 UTC+2

AS Maniema Union (Democratic Republic of the Congo)	0–2	(South Africa) Bloemfontein Celtic
	Report	Tchilimbou 6'; Ndwandwe 8'

Stade Joseph-Kabila, Kindu
Referee: Justus Mbelle (Cameroon)
5 December 2020
15:30 UTC+2

Bloemfontein Celtic (South Africa)	0–2	(Democratic Republic of the Congo) AS Maniema Union
	Report	Basiala 37'; Yelemaya 48'
Penalties
Mereko (penalty scored); Tchilimbou (penalty missed); Luthuli (penalty scored); Ndwandwe (penalty scored)	3–2	(penalty scored) Tansele; (penalty missed) Basiala; (penalty missed) Mvumbi; (penalty scored) Aruna; (penalty missed) Monzali

Dr. Petrus Molemela Stadium, Bloemfontein
Referee: Simoes Guambe (Mozambique)

2–2 on aggregate. Bloemfontein Celtic won 3–2 on penalties.

28 November 2020
16:00 UTC+1

Futuro Kings (Equatorial Guinea)	2–1	(Nigeria) Rivers United
Nkama 46', 65'	Report	Aguda 88' (pen.)

Estadio de Mongomo, Mongomo
Referee: Esterline Género (São Tomé and Príncipe)
6 December 2020
16:00 UTC+1

Rivers United (Nigeria)	2–1	(Equatorial Guinea) Futuro Kings
Aguda 12'; Adedipe 38'	Report	Oba 52'
Penalties
Bamba (penalty scored); Ihunda (penalty missed); Enyinaya (penalty missed); Odunlami (penalty scored)	2–0	(penalty missed) Nkama; (penalty missed) Nahimana; (penalty missed) Ángel; (penalty missed) Devesa

Adokiye Amiesimaka Stadium, Port Harcourt
Referee: Charles Benle Bulu (Ghana)

3–3 on aggregate. Rivers United won 2–0 on penalties.

== First round ==
The first round, also called the second preliminary round, will include 32 teams: the 13 teams that received byes to this round, and the 19 winners of the preliminary round.

Team 1	Agg.	Team 2	1st leg	2nd leg
Tevragh-Zeina (Mauritania)	0–2	(Morocco) RS Berkane	0–0	0–2
Renaissance (Chad)	w/o (Note: Renaissance failed to appear for the first leg in N'Djamena following disputes between the Ministry of Youth and Sports in the country and the Chadian Football Federation, which prevented the club from playing the match in their home country. As a result, Renaissance were disqualified from the competition by CAF, and ES Sétif won on walkover.)	(Algeria) ES Sétif	—	—
USGN (Niger)	1–4	(Algeria) JS Kabylie	1–2	0–2
TAS Casablanca (Morocco)	5–1	(Benin) ESAE	4–0	1–1
ASC Jaraaf (Senegal)	2–2 (a)	(Ivory Coast) FC San Pédro	0–1	2–1
Al Mokawloon Al Arab (Egypt)	1–2	(Tunisia) Étoile du Sahel	0–0	1–2
Al Ittihad (Libya)	2–4	(Egypt) Pyramids	0–1	2–3
US Monastir (Tunisia)	2–0	(Libya) Al Ahli Tripoli	2–0	0–0
Namungo (Tanzania)	5–3	(Sudan) El Hilal El Obeid	2–0	3–3
Sagrada Esperança (Angola)	w/o (Note: Orlando Pirates won on a walkover after Sagrada Esperança withdrew from the second leg in South Africa citing health concerns caused due to the new COVID-19 variant.)	(South Africa) Orlando Pirates	0–1	—
AS Kigali (Rwanda)	3–3 (a)	(Uganda) KCCA	2–0 (awd.) (Note: The first round first leg match between AS Kigali and KCCA could not be played after 2 of the 15 players from KCCA tested positive for COVID-19. Thus, KCCA were not able to name the required 15 players for holding the match, and subsequently, AS Kigali were awarded a technical 2–0 victory for the first leg by CAF in accordance with the regulations related to COVID-19.)	1–3
NAPSA Stars (Zambia)	1–1 (a)	(Mozambique) UD Songo	0–0	1–1
Bravos do Maquis (Angola)	1–3	(Democratic Republic of the Congo) DC Motema Pembe	0–1	1–2
Al Amal Atbara (Sudan)	0–3	(Burkina Faso) Salitas	0–1	0–2
Green Eagles (Zambia)	0–3	(Cameroon) Coton Sport	0–2	0–1
Bloemfontein Celtic (South Africa)	0–5	(Nigeria) Rivers United	0–2	0–3

Notes:

23 December 2020
16:00 UTC+0

Tevragh-Zeina (Mauritania)	0–0	(Morocco) RS Berkane
	Report

Stade Cheikha Ould Boïdiya, Nouakchott
Referee: Lamin Jammeh (Gambia)
6 January 2021
19:00 UTC+1

RS Berkane (Morocco)	2–0	(Mauritania) Tevragh-Zeina
Iajour 30' (pen.), 90'	Report

Stade Municipal de Berkane, Berkane
Referee: Lyes Bekouassa (Algeria)

RS Berkane won 2–0 on aggregate.

23 December 2020
15:00 UTC+1

Renaissance (Chad)	Cancelled	(Algeria) ES Sétif
	Report

Stade Omnisports Idriss Mahamat Ouya, N'Djamena
Referee: André Kolissala (Central African Republic)
5 January 2021
18:00 UTC+1

ES Sétif (Algeria)	Cancelled	(Chad) Renaissance
	Report

Stade 8 Mai 1945, Sétif

ES Sétif won on walkover after Renaissance were disqualified by CAF for failing to appear for the first leg in N'Djamena.

22 December 2020
15:30 UTC+1

USGN (Niger)	1–2	(Algeria) JS Kabylie
Moumouni 34' (pen.)	Report	Bensayah 25'; Nezla 88'

Stade Général Seyni Kountché, Niamey
Referee: Quadri Adebimpe (Nigeria)
5 January 2021
15:00 UTC+1

JS Kabylie (Algeria)	2–0	(Niger) USGN
Bensayah 5'; Oukaci 64'	Report

Stade du 1er Novembre 1954, Tizi Ouzou
Referee: Mohamed Agha (Libya)

JS Kabylie won 4–1 on aggregate.

23 December 2020
20:00 UTC+1

TAS Casablanca (Morocco)	4–0	(Benin) ESAE
Rabja 15'; Bentayg 34'; Acha 59'; Ennebgui 68'	Report

Stade Mohammed V, Casablanca
Referee: Nabil Boukhalfa (Algeria)
6 January 2021
14:00 UTC+1

ESAE (Benin)	1–1	(Morocco) TAS Casablanca
Chukwudi 81'	Report	Rabja 90'

Stade Charles de Gaulle, Porto-Novo
Referee: Joseph Ogabor (Nigeria)

TAS Casablanca won 5–1 on aggregate.

23 December 2020
17:00 UTC+0

ASC Jaraaf (Senegal)	0–1	(Ivory Coast) FC San Pédro
	Report	Soumaro 41'

Stade Lat-Dior, Thiès
Referee: Beida Dahane (Mauritania)
6 January 2021
16:00 UTC+0

FC San Pédro (Ivory Coast)	1–2	(Senegal) ASC Jaraaf
Zumah 86'	Report	Diène 17'; N'Diaye 76'

Stade Félix Houphouët-Boigny, Abidjan
Referee: Raphiou Ligali (Benin)

2–2 on aggregate. ASC Jaraaf won on away goals.

22 December 2020
18:00 UTC+2

Al Mokawloon Al Arab (Egypt)	0–0	(Tunisia) Étoile du Sahel
	Report

Osman Ahmed Osman Stadium, Cairo
Referee: Abdulrazig Ahmed (Libya)
6 January 2021
18:00 UTC+1

Étoile du Sahel (Tunisia)	2–1	(Egypt) Al Mokawloon Al Arab
Coulibaly 22', 87' (pen.)	Report	Jaziri 51'

Stade Mustapha Ben Jannet, Monastir
Referee: Noureddine El Jaafari (Morocco)

Étoile du Sahel won 2–1 on aggregate.

22 December 2020
17:00 UTC+2

Al Ittihad (Libya)	0–1	(Egypt) Pyramids
	Report	Antwi 55'

Alexandria Stadium, Alexandria (Egypt)
Referee: Rédouane Jiyed (Morocco)
5 January 2021
18:30 UTC+2

Pyramids (Egypt)	3–2	(Libya) Al Ittihad
El Said 23' (pen.); Traoré 27'; El Gabbas 36'	Report	Mohammed 3'; Salih 90'

30 June Stadium, Cairo
Referee: Haythem Guirat (Tunisia)

Pyramids won 4–2 on aggregate.

23 December 2020
14:00 UTC+1

US Monastir (Tunisia)	2–0	(Libya) Al Ahli Tripoli
Mumuni 33'; Jlassi 45'	Report

Stade Mustapha Ben Jannet, Monastir
Referee: Ibrahim Nour El Din (Egypt)
6 January 2021
15:30 UTC+2

Al Ahli Tripoli (Libya)	0-0	(Tunisia) US Monastir
	Report

Petro Sport Stadium, Cairo (Egypt)
Referee: Sidi Alioum (Cameroon)

US Monastir won 2–0 on aggregate.

23 December 2020
17:00 UTC+3

Namungo (Tanzania)	2–0	(Sudan) El Hilal El Obeid
Sabilo 13'; Sey 31'	Report

Chamazi Stadium, Dar es Salaam
Referee: Hassan Mohammed Hagi (Somalia)
5 January 2021
15:00 UTC+2

El Hilal El Obeid (Sudan)	3–3	(Tanzania) Namungo
Eisa 12', 19'; Ali 13'	Report	Sey 2'; Bigirimana 38'; Manyama 50'

Al Hilal Stadium, Omdurman
Referee: Chelangat Sabilla (Uganda)

Namungo won 5–3 on aggregate.

22 December 2020
15:00 UTC+1

Sagrada Esperança (Angola)	0–1	(South Africa) Orlando Pirates
	Report	Lorch 73'

Estádio dos Coqueiros, Luanda
Referee: Audrick Nkole (Zambia)
6 January 2021
19:00 UTC+2

Orlando Pirates (South Africa)	Cancelled	(Angola) Sagrada Esperança
	Report

Johannesburg Stadium, Johannesburg

Orlando Pirates won on walkover after Sagrada Esperança withdrew from the second leg in South Africa citing health concerns caused due to the new COVID-19 variant.

23 December 2020
15:00 UTC+2

AS Kigali (Rwanda)	2–0 (awarded) (Note: The first round first leg match between AS Kigali and KCCA could not be played after 2 of the 15 players from KCCA tested positive for COVID-19. Thus, KCCA were not able to name the required 15 players for holding the match, and subsequently, AS Kigali were awarded a technical 2–0 victory for the first leg by CAF in accordance with the regulations related to COVID-19.)	(Uganda) KCCA
	Report

Nyamirambo Regional Stadium, Kigali
Referee: Elsiddig Mohamed Eltreefe (Sudan)
6 January 2021
16:00 UTC+3

KCCA (Uganda)	3–1	(Rwanda) AS Kigali
Aheebwa 1', 38', 76'	Report	Hakizimana 49' (pen.)

Mandela National Stadium, Kampala
Referee: Anthony Ogwayo (Kenya)

3–3 on aggregate. AS Kigali won on away goals.

22 December 2020
15:00 UTC+2

NAPSA Stars (Zambia)	0–0	(Mozambique) UD Songo
	Report

National Heroes Stadium, Lusaka
Referee: Gift Chicco (Malawi)
6 January 2021
15:00 UTC+2

UD Songo (Mozambique)	1–1	(Zambia) NAPSA Stars
Lau King 22'	Report	Mayuka 75'

Estádio do Ferroviário, Beira
Referee: Lebalang Mokete (Lesotho)

1–1 on aggregate. NAPSA Stars won on away goals.

23 December 2020
17:00 UTC+1

Bravos do Maquis (Angola)	0–1	(Democratic Republic of the Congo) DC Motema Pembe
	Report	Ngimbi 90'

Estádio dos Coqueiros, Luanda
Referee: Eugene Mdluli (South Africa)
5 January 2021
15:30 UTC+1

DC Motema Pembe (Democratic Republic of the Congo)	2–1	(Angola) Bravos do Maquis
Kabangu 58'; Pumba 84'	Report	Lourenço 89' (pen.)

Stade des Martyrs, Kinshasa
Referee: Ahmat Hassane (Chad)

DC Motema Pembe won 3–1 on aggregate.

22 December 2020
15:00 UTC+2

Al Amal Atbara (Sudan)	0–1	(Burkina Faso) Salitas
	Report	Boissy 11'

Al Hilal Stadium, Omdurman
Referee: Souleiman Ahmed Djama (Djibouti)
6 January 2021
18:00 UTC+0

Salitas (Burkina Faso)	2–0	(Sudan) Al Amal Atbara
Aouba 7'; Nikièma 45'	Report

Stade du 4 Août, Ouagadougou
Referee: Mohamed Ali Moussa (Niger)

Salitas won 3–0 on aggregate.

23 December 2020
15:00 UTC+2

Green Eagles (Zambia)	0–2	(Cameroon) Coton Sport
	Report	Oukiné 46'; Tchuente 63' (pen.)

Nkoloma Stadium, Lusaka
Referee: Thulani Sibandze (Eswatini)
5 January 2021
15:30 UTC+1

Coton Sport (Cameroon)	1–0	(Zambia) Green Eagles
Araina 4'	Report

Stade Roumdé Adjia, Garoua
Referee: Kabanga Malala (DR Congo)

Coton Sport won 3–0 on aggregate.

23 December 2020
18:00 UTC+2

Bloemfontein Celtic (South Africa)	0–2	(Nigeria) Rivers United
	Report	Aguda 70'; Omoniwari 81'

Dr. Petrus Molemela Stadium, Bloemfontein
Referee: Ali Mohamed Adelaid (Comoros)
23 January 2021
16:00 UTC+1

Rivers United (Nigeria)	3–0	(South Africa) Bloemfontein Celtic
Aguda 1', 33' (pen.); Omoniwari 59'	Report

Stade Charles de Gaulle, Porto-Novo (Benin)
Referee: Kalilou Traoré (Ivory Coast)

Rivers United won 5–0 on aggregate.

== Play-off round ==
The play-off round, also called the additional second preliminary round, includes 32 teams: the 16 winners of the Confederation Cup first round, and the 16 losers of the Champions League first round.

The draw for the play-off round was held on 8 January 2021, 12:00 GMT (14:00 local time, UTC+2), at the CAF headquarters in Cairo, Egypt.

The teams were seeded by their performances in the CAF competitions for the previous five seasons (CAF 5-year ranking points shown in parentheses):

- Pot A contained the 7 seeded losers of the Champions League first round.
- Pot B contained the 7 unseeded winners of the Confederation Cup first round.
- Pot C contained the 8 unseeded losers of the Champions League first round.
- Pot D contained the 8 seeded winners of the Confederation Cup first round.

Teams from Pot A were drawn against teams from Pot B into seven ties, and teams from Pot C were drawn against teams from Pot D into eight ties.

	Withdrawn	Bye to group stage
Qualified from	Champions League	Confederation Cup
Teams	(Chad) ~~Gazelle~~	(Morocco) RS Berkane (47 pts)

Pot	Pot A	Pot B	Pot C	Pot D
Qualified from	Champions League	Confederation Cup	Champions League	Confederation Cup
Teams	(Morocco) Raja Casablanca (39 pts); (Angola) 1º de Agosto (22 pts); (Nigeria) Enyimba (21 pts); (Tunisia) CS Sfaxien (16 pts); (Kenya) Gor Mahia (11 pts); (Zimbabwe) FC Platinum (9 pts); (Zambia) Nkana (8 pts)	(Nigeria) Rivers United (1 pt) (Note: The identity of the winners of the tie between Rivers United and Bloemfontein Celtic was not known at the time of the draw, as their CAF Confederation Cup first round second leg fixture was postponed and not played before the draw.); (Morocco) TAS Casablanca; (Rwanda) AS Kigali; (Senegal) ASC Jaraaf; (Tanzania) Namungo; (Tunisia) US Monastir; (Zambia) NAPSA Stars	(Ghana) Asante Kotoko (4 pts); (Botswana) Jwaneng Galaxy; (Eswatini) Young Buffaloes; (Gabon) AS Bouenguidi; (Ivory Coast) RC Abidjan; (Libya) Al Ahly Benghazi; (Mali) Stade Malien; (Niger) AS SONIDEP	(Tunisia) Étoile du Sahel (47 pts); (Egypt) Pyramids (20 pts); (Algeria) ES Sétif (12 pts); (Algeria) JS Kabylie (10 pts); (South Africa) Orlando Pirates (8 pts); (Democratic Republic of the Congo) DC Motema Pembe (5 pts); (Burkina Faso) Salitas (2 pts); (Cameroon) Coton Sport (2 pts)

The 15 winners of the play-off round will advance to the group stage to join RS Berkane, who advanced directly to the group stage as the winners of the first round with the best CAF 5-year ranking following Gazelle withdrawal from the competition after being transferred from the Champions League.

Team 1	Agg.	Team 2	1st leg	2nd leg
Enyimba (Nigeria)	1–1 (5–4 p)	(Nigeria) Rivers United	1–0	0–1
1º de Agosto (Angola)	5–7	(Tanzania) Namungo	2–6	3–1
FC Platinum (Zimbabwe)	0–2	(Senegal) ASC Jaraaf	0–1	0–1
CS Sfaxien (Tunisia)	5–2	(Rwanda) AS Kigali	4–1	1–1
Raja Casablanca (Morocco)	1–1 (6–5 p)	(Tunisia) US Monastir	1–0	0–1
Nkana (Zambia)	3–2	(Morocco) TAS Casablanca	2–0	1–2
Gor Mahia (Kenya)	2–3	(Zambia) NAPSA Stars	0–1	2–2
AS Bouenguidi (Gabon)	2–3	(Burkina Faso) Salitas	1–0	1–3
Asante Kotoko (Ghana)	1–2	(Algeria) ES Sétif	1–2	0–0
Young Buffaloes (Eswatini)	1–4	(Tunisia) Étoile du Sahel	1–2	0–2
AS SONIDEP (Niger)	0–2	(Cameroon) Coton Sport	0–1	0–1
Al Ahly Benghazi (Libya)	2–2 (8–7 p)	(Democratic Republic of the Congo) DC Motema Pembe	1–1	1–1
Stade Malien (Mali)	2–2 (a)	(Algeria) JS Kabylie	2–1	0–1
RC Abidjan (Ivory Coast)	0–4	(Egypt) Pyramids	0–2	0–2
Jwaneng Galaxy (Botswana)	0–4	(South Africa) Orlando Pirates	0–3	0–1

14 February 2021
16:00 UTC+1

Enyimba (Nigeria)	1–0	(Nigeria) Rivers United
Olisema 60'	Report

Enyimba International Stadium, Aba
Referee: Mehdi Abid Charef (Algeria)
21 February 2021
16:00 UTC+1

Rivers United (Nigeria)	1–0	(Nigeria) Enyimba
Omoniwari 42'	Report
Penalties
Bamba (penalty scored); Anaemena (penalty scored); Odunlami (penalty missed); Aguda (penalty scored); Afelokhai (penalty scored); Emmanuel (penalty missed)	4–5	(penalty missed) Olisema; (penalty scored) Kadiri; (penalty scored) Iwuala; (penalty scored) Orok; (penalty scored) Oladapo; (penalty scored) Noble

Adokiye Amiesimaka Stadium, Port Harcourt
Referee: Omar Sallah (Gambia)

1–1 on aggregate. Enyimba won 5–4 on penalties.

21 February 2021
19:00 UTC+3

1º de Agosto (Angola)	2–6	(Tanzania) Namungo
Moya 15'; Bokamba 52'	Report	Manyanya 35'; Sabilo 41', 60'; Lusajo 56'; Kwizera 66'; Sey 72'

Chamazi Stadium, Mbagala (Tanzania)
Referee: Mohamed Adel (Egypt)
25 February 2021
17:00 UTC+3

Namungo (Tanzania)	1–3	(Angola) 1º de Agosto
Sabilo 8'	Report	Moya 28' (pen.), 51'; Jó 90'

Chamazi Stadium, Mbagala
Referee: Andofetra Rakotojaona (Madagascar)

Namungo won 7–5 on aggregate

14 February 2021
15:00 UTC+2

FC Platinum (Zimbabwe)	0–1	(Senegal) ASC Jaraaf
	Report	Diène 68'

National Sports Stadium, Harare
Referee: Victor Gomes (South Africa)
21 February 2021
16:00 UTC+0

ASC Jaraaf (Senegal)	1–0	(Zimbabwe) FC Platinum
Kané 12'	Report

Stade Lat-Dior, Thiès
Referee: Younoussa Camara (Guinea)

ASC Jaraaf won 2–0 on aggregate

13 February 2021
15:00 UTC+1

CS Sfaxien (Tunisia)	4–1	(Rwanda) AS Kigali
Chaouat 7'; Ammar 54'; Soulah 71', 89'	Report	Zammouri 61' (o.g.)

Stade Taïeb Mhiri, Sfax
Referee: Bernard Camille (Seychelles)
20 February 2021
15:00 UTC+2

AS Kigali (Rwanda)	1–1	(Tunisia) CS Sfaxien
Lawal 44'	Report	Chaouat 61'

Nyamirambo Regional Stadium, Kigali
Referee: Godfrey Nkhakananga (Malawi)

CS Sfaxien won 5–2 on aggregate

14 February 2021
17:00 UTC+1

Raja Casablanca (Morocco)	1–0	(Tunisia) US Monastir
Benhalib 35'	Report

Stade Mohammed V, Casablanca
Referee: Daouda Gueye (Senegal)
21 February 2021
14:00 UTC+1

US Monastir (Tunisia)	1–0	(Morocco) Raja Casablanca
Jlassi 38'	Report
Penalties
Ben Romdhane (penalty missed); Chikhaoui (penalty scored); Mhirsi (penalty scored); Arfaoui (penalty scored); Jlassi (penalty scored); Tshibamba (penalty scored); Saghraoui (penalty missed)	5–6	(penalty scored) Rahimi; (penalty missed) Hafidi; (penalty scored) Al Warfali; (penalty scored) El Wardi; (penalty scored) Arjoune; (penalty scored) Madkour; (penalty scored) Malango

Stade Mustapha Ben Jannet, Monastir
Referee: Mehdi Abid Charef (Algeria)

1–1 on aggregate. Raja Casablanca won 6–5 on penalties.

14 February 2021
15:00 UTC+2

Nkana (Zambia)	2–0	(Morocco) TAS Casablanca
Tshimenga 17'; Masumbuko 85'	Report

Nkana Stadium, Kitwe
Referee: Anthony Ogwayo (Kenya)
21 February 2021
20:00 UTC+1

TAS Casablanca (Morocco)	2–1	(Zambia) Nkana
Bentyag 4'; Dairani 37'	Report	Mulenga 57'

Stade Mohammed V, Casablanca
Referee: Abdulwahid Huraywidah (Libya)

Nkana won 3–2 on aggregate

14 February 2021
15:00 UTC+3

Gor Mahia (Kenya)	0–1	(Zambia) NAPSA Stars
	Report	Adoko 85'

Nyayo National Stadium, Nairobi
Referee: William Oloya (Uganda)
21 February 2021
15:00 UTC+2

NAPSA Stars (Zambia)	2–2	(Kenya) Gor Mahia
Banda 17'; Mayuka 90' (pen.)	Report	Onyango 16'; Miheso 19'

National Heroes Stadium, Lusaka
Referee: Lebalang Mokete (Lesotho)

NAPSA Stars won 3–2 on aggregate

14 February 2021
15:30 UTC+1

AS Bouenguidi (Gabon)	1–0	(Burkina Faso) Salitas
Aubiang 82' (pen.)	Report

Stade Augustin Monédan de Sibang, Libreville
Referee: Bienvenu Sinko (Ivory Coast)
21 February 2021
18:00 UTC+0

Salitas (Burkina Faso)	3–1	(Gabon) AS Bouenguidi
Kaboré 10'; Hien 45'; Boissy 54'	Report	Aubiang 12'

Stade du 4 Août, Ouagadougou
Referee: Djindo Houngnandande (Benin)

Salitas won 3–2 on aggregate

14 February 2021
15:00 UTC+0

Asante Kotoko (Ghana)	1–2	(Algeria) ES Sétif
Opoku 70'	Report	Amoura 74'; Kendouci 81'

Accra Sports Stadium, Accra
Referee: Antoine Effa Essouma (Cameroon)
21 February 2021
18:00 UTC+1

ES Sétif (Algeria)	0–0	(Ghana) Asante Kotoko
	Report

Stade 8 Mai 1945, Sétif
Referee: Haythem Guirat (Tunisia)

ES Sétif won 2–1 on aggregate

14 February 2021
15:00 UTC+2

Young Buffaloes (Eswatini)	1–2	(Tunisia) Étoile du Sahel
Matsebula 86'	Report	Coulibaly 6', 74'

Mavuso Sports Centre, Manzini
Referee: Ali Adelaid (Comoros)
23 February 2021
16:00 UTC+1

Étoile du Sahel (Tunisia)	2–0	(Eswatini) Young Buffaloes
Chikhaoui 79'; Belhadj 87'	Report

Stade Taïeb Mhiri, Sfax
Referee: Ibrahim Nour El Din (Egypt)

Étoile du Sahel won 4–1 on aggregate

14 February 2021
16:00 UTC+1

AS SONIDEP (Niger)	0–1	(Cameroon) Coton Sport
	Report	Tchuenté 71'

Stade Général Seyni Kountché, Niamey
Referee: Jean Claude Ishimwe (Rwanda)
21 February 2021
16:00 UTC+1

Coton Sport (Cameroon)	1–0	(Niger) AS SONIDEP
Araina 73'	Report

Stade Roumdé Adjia, Garoua
Referee: Hassan Mohammed Hagi (Somalia)

Coton Sport won 2–0 on aggregate

14 February 2021
19:00 UTC+2

Al Ahly Benghazi (Libya)	1–1	(Democratic Republic of the Congo) DC Motema Pembe
Hamid 10'	Report	Kabangu 43'

Petro Sport Stadium, Cairo (Egypt)
Referee: Noureddine El Jaafari (Morocco)
21 February 2021
15:30 UTC+1

DC Motema Pembe (Democratic Republic of the Congo)	1–1	(Libya) Al Ahly Benghazi
Tomandzoto 44'	Report	Al Sherif 86'
Penalties
Kabangu (penalty scored); Tomandzoto (penalty scored); Kapela (penalty missed); Likuta (penalty scored); Inonga (penalty scored); Kanda (penalty scored); Koné (penalty scored); Ngimbi (penalty scored); Kayembe (penalty missed); Nkosi (penalty missed)	7–8	(penalty scored) Imhamed; (penalty scored) Ben Aamer; (penalty scored) Al Tawerghi; (penalty missed) El Taib; (penalty scored) Omran; (penalty scored) Al Sherif; (penalty scored) Al Naeli; (penalty scored) Al Musrati; (penalty missed) Rizq; (penalty scored) Huwaydi

Stade des Martyrs, Kinshasa
Referee: Louis Hakizimana (Rwanda)

2–2 on aggregate. Al Ahly Benghazi won 8–7 on penalties.

14 February 2021
16:00 UTC+0

Stade Malien (Mali)	2–1	(Algeria) JS Kabylie
Aristides 28'; Coulibaly 90' (pen.)	Report	Souyad 53'

Stade du 26 Mars, Bamako
Referee: Fabricio Duarte (Cape Verde)
21 February 2021
16:00 UTC+1

JS Kabylie (Algeria)	1–0	(Mali) Stade Malien
Souyad 5'	Report

Stade du 1er Novembre 1954, Tizi Ouzou
Referee: Sadok Selmi (Tunisia)

2–2 on aggregate. JS Kabylie won on away goals.

14 February 2021
16:00 UTC+0

RC Abidjan (Ivory Coast)	0–2	(Egypt) Pyramids
	Report	Issa 19', 82'

Stade Olympique Alassane Ouattara, Abidjan
Referee: Quadri Adebimpe (Nigeria)
21 February 2021
18:00 UTC+2

Pyramids (Egypt)	2–0	(Ivory Coast) RC Abidjan
Rolán 3'; Sobhi 74'	Report

30 June Stadium, Cairo
Referee: Sabri Mohamed Fadul (Sudan)

Pyramids won 4–0 on aggregate

14 February 2021
15:00 UTC+2

Jwaneng Galaxy (Botswana)	0–3	(South Africa) Orlando Pirates
	Report	Hlatshwayo 32'; Mntambo 77'; Mundele 84'

Botswana National Stadium, Gaborone
Referee: Mathews Hamalila (Zambia)
21 February 2021
17:00 UTC+2

Orlando Pirates (South Africa)	1–0	(Botswana) Jwaneng Galaxy
Mntambo 55'	Report

Orlando Stadium, Soweto
Referee: Norman Matemera (Zimbabwe)

Orlando Pirates won 4–0 on aggregate
