= 2020–21 C.D. Primeiro de Agosto season =

Clube Desportivo Primeiro de Agosto
2020–21 season
- President: Gen. Carlos Hendrick
- Manager: Paulo Duarte (Sep 2020–Jun 2021); Filipe Nzanza (Jun 2021–Jul 2021)
- Stadium: Estádio 11 de Novembro
- Champions League: Round 1
Home colours	Away colours	Third colours

The 2020–21 season of Clube Desportivo Primeiro de Agosto is the club's 43rd season in the Girabola, the Angolan Premier football League and 43rd consecutive season in the top flight of Angolan football. In 2020–21, the club is participating in the Girabola, the Angola Cup and the 2020–21 CAF Champions League.

== Squad information ==
=== First team ===
As of August 2019

Squad No.	Name	Nationality	Position(s)	Place of birth	Date of birth (Age)	Previous club	Seasons
Goalkeepers
12	Adão Cabaça Tony	(Angola)	GK	Luanda, Angola	23 April 1986 (aged 35)	(Angola) Junior team	
22	Adilson Cruz Neblú	(Angola)	GK	Luanda, Angola	16 December 1993 (aged 28)	(Angola) Interclube	
31	Nsesani Simão	(Angola)	GK	Luanda, Angola	5 November 2000 (aged 21)	(Angola) Académica do Lobito	
Defenders
3	Natael Masuekama	(Angola)	LB	Kinshasa, D.R. Congo	23 September 1993 (aged 28)	(Angola) Recreativo do Libolo	
4	Bodrick Muselenge Bobo	(Democratic Republic of the Congo)	CB	Kasa-Vubu, D.R. Congo	19 November 1989 (aged 32)	(Angola) Kabuscorp	
5	Massunguna Afonso Dani	(Angola)	CB	Benguela, Angola	1 May 1986 (aged 35)	(Angola) Primeiro de Maio	
6	Bonifácio Caetano	(Angola)	CB	Luanda, Angola	9 August 1993 (aged 28)	(Angola) Desportivo da Huíla	
15	Mariano Vidal Jó	(Angola)	CB	Angola	20 February 1995 (aged 26)	(Angola) Progresso Sambizanga	
19	Salomão Troco Paizo	(Angola)	LB	Luanda, Angola	10 May 1992 (aged 29)	(Angola) Norberto de Castro	
21	Isaac Costa	(Angola)	RB	Luanda, Angola	25 April 1991 (aged 30)	(Angola) Petro de Luanda	
23	Nelson Mudile Mona	(Angola)	RB	Luanda, Angola	26 July 1997 (aged 24)	(Angola) Recreativo da Caála	1
Midfielders
7	Cirilo Silva	(Angola)	RW	Angola	2 March 1998 (aged 23)	(Angola) Junior team	
8	Mário Balbúrdia	(Angola)	CM	Luanda, Angola	19 August 1997 (aged 24)	(Angola) Junior team	
9	Luvumbo Pedro Buá	(Angola)	CM/DM	Luanda, Angola	6 September 1988 (aged 33)	(Angola) Petro de Luanda	
10	Yazid Atouba	(Cameroon)	AM	Yaoundé, Cameroon	2 January 1993 (aged 28)	(South Africa) Maritzburg United	
13	Kipe Bokamba Mongo	(Democratic Republic of the Congo)	LW	D.R. Congo	22 August 1993 (aged 28)	(Angola) Kabuscorp	
14	Fernando Mateus Duarte	(Angola)	LW		28 February 2000 (aged 21)	(Angola) Junior team	2
16	José Macaia	(Angola)	DM	Cabinda, Angola	24 March 1994 (aged 27)	(Angola) Benfica de Luanda	
18	Herenilson do Carmo	(Angola)	DM	Luanda, Angola	27 August 1996 (aged 25)	(Angola) Petro de Luanda	1
24	Zinedine Catraio	(Angola)	AM	Luanda, Angola	17 June 1998 (aged 23)	(Angola) Junior team	
30	Luís Manico Gonçalves	(Angola)	LW	Luanda, Angola	10 January 1995 (aged 26)	(Angola) Desportivo da Huíla	1
33	Etson Congo Zalata Manelé	(Angola)	LW		9 August 2002 (aged 18)	(Angola) Junior team	
Forwards
11	Brayan Moya	(Venezuela)	ST	Luanda, Angola	19 October 1993 (aged 28)	(Angola) Zulia F.C.	1
20	Ambrosini António Cabaça Salvador Zini	(Angola)	ST	Luanda, Angola	3 July 2002 (aged 19)	(Angola) Junior team	1
26	Agostinho Paciência Mabululu	(Angola)	ST	Luanda, Angola	1 June 1992 (aged 29)	(Angola) Domant FC	

=== Out on loan ===
As of August 2019

Name	Nationality	Position(s)	Date of birth (Age)	To Club	Notes
João Muanha Gogoró	(Angola)	RW	6 June 1995 (aged 26)	(Angola) Progresso Sambizanga	
Régio Zalata Mingo Bile	(Angola)	RW	15 June 1987 (aged 34)	(Angola) Desportivo da Huíla	

=== Staff ===
Nat	Name	Position(s)	Date of birth (age)	Note
Technical staff
(Portugal)	Paulo Duarte	Head coach	6 April 1969 (aged 52)	Sacked 29/06/2021
(Burkina Faso)	Narcisse Yaméogo	Assistant coach	19 November 1980 (aged 41)	Sacked 29/06/2021
(Angola)	Filipe Nzanza	Assistant coach	19 May 1969 (aged 52)	Promoted 29/06/2021
(Angola)	Ivo Traça	Assistant coach	19 May 1961 (aged 60)	
(Angola)	Napoleão Brandão	Goalkeeper coach	13 June 1952 (aged 69)	
Medical
(Cuba)	Abel Sanz	Physician	–	
(Angola)	Leonilde Ferreira	Psychotherapist	–	
(Portugal)	Tiago Sobral	Fitness coach	–	
(Angola)	Feliciano Madalena	Physio	–	
(Angola)	Andrade Mendes	Physio	–	
Management
(Angola)	Gen. Carlos Hendrick	Chairman	–	
(Angola)	Paulo Magueijo	Vice-Chairman	–	
(Angola)	José Marcelino	Head of Foot Dept	–	
(Angola)	Carlos Alves	Spokesman	–	

=== Pre-season transfers ===
No.	Nat	Nick	Name	Pos	Date of Birth (Age)	
Transfers out To
1	(Angola)	Julião	Justo Mateus Pucusso	GK	15 July 1992 (aged 28)	Desportivo da Huíla
10	(Nigeria)	Ibukun	Ibukun Akinfenwa	CM	22 October 1990 (aged 30)	
11	(Angola)	Zito	Zito Luvumbo	FW	9 March 2002 (aged 18)	Cagliari Calcio
20	(Democratic Republic of the Congo)	Kila	Emmanuel Ngudikama	FW	7 September 1987 (aged 33)	
27	(Cameroon)	Lionel	Lionel Véra Yombi	ST	5 February 1994 (aged 26)	
30	(Angola)	Ary Papel	Manuel David Afonso	LW	6 May 1994 (aged 26)	Ismaily SC
Transfers in From
1	(Angola)	Nsesani	Nsesani Simão	GK	5 November 2000 (aged 21)	Académica do Lobito
2	(Angola)	Mira	Daniel João Zongo Macuenho	MF	12 February 1991 (aged 30)	Interclube
11	(Honduras)	Brayan	Brayan Josué Velásquez Moya	AM	19 October 1993 (aged 28)	Zulia F.C.
14	(Angola)	Duarte	Fernando Mateus Duarte	MF	28 February 2000 (aged 21)	Junior team
17	(Republic of the Congo)	Giovani	Elvia Giovani Ipamy	FW	27 September 1994 (aged 27)	TP Mazembe
18	(Angola)	Herenilson	Herenilson Caifalo do Carmo	DM	27 August 1996 (aged 25)	Petro de Luanda
20	(Angola)	Zini	Ambrosini António Cabaça Salvador	FW	3 July 2002 (aged 19)	Junior team
23	(Angola)	Mona	Nelson Miango Mudile	DF	26 July 1997 (aged 24)	Recreativo da Caála
25	(Angola)	Edmilson	António Dipoco Teodor	MF	6 February 1999 (aged 22)	Recreativo da Caála
30	(Angola)	Manico	Luís Manico Gonçalves	MF	10 January 1995 (aged 26)	Desportivo da Huíla
–	(Democratic Republic of the Congo)	Rachidi	Rachidi Asumani	CM	25 February 1994 (aged 27)	DC Motema Pembe

=== Mid-season transfers ===
No.	Nat	Nick	Name	Pos	Date of Birth (Age)
Transfers out To
Transfers in From

== Overview ==
Competition	First match	Last match	Record							
Competition	First match	Last match	Pld	W	D	L	GF	GA	GD	Win %
Girabola	29 December 2020	28 February 2021	5	4	0	1	8	4	+4	80.00
Angola Cup			0	0	0	0	0	0	+0	—
CAF Champions League	23 December 2020	5 January 2021	2	0	1	1	0	1	−1	0.00
CAF Confederation Cup							—			
Total			7	4	1	2	8	5	+3	57.14

Last updated: 28 February 2021

== Pre-season and friendlies ==
Wed, 28 Oct 2020 1	1º de Agosto	3–1	Bravos do Maquis	11 de Novembro, Luanda
18:00 WAT (UTC+1)	Bobo 64'; Mabululu 72'; Manico 90+1'		32' Mussumari
Note: Tony / Bobo, Dani (c), Isaac, Paizo / Fernando, Herenilson, Macaia, Mongo / Brayan, Mabululu — Manico

Sun, 1 Nov 2020 2	1º de Agosto	3–2	Sagrada Esperança	11 de Novembro, Luanda
18:00 WAT (UTC+1)	Mário 10'; Brayan 24'; Zini 34'		14' Jó; 49' Lima	Referee: Sabino de Carvalho; Pedro Futa, Nelson Teka
Note: Neblú / Bonifácio, Dani (c), Jó, Natael / Buá, Catraio, Duarte, Mário / Brayan, Zini —

Tue, 3 Nov 2020 3	1º de Agosto	1–2	Petro de Luanda	11 de Novembro, Luanda
18:00 WAT (UTC+1)	Mabululu 71'		40' Tony; 51' Matuwila	Referee: João Ngoma

Sun, 8 Nov 2020 4	1º de Agosto	2–0	Bravos do Maquis	França Ndalu, Luanda
15:00 WAT (UTC+1)	Zine 21'; Buá 38'

== Angolan League ==
=== League table ===
Pos	Team	Pld	W	D	L	GF	GA	GD	Pts	Qualification or relegation
1	Sagrada Esperança (C)	30	21	7	2	42	10	+32	70	Qualification for Champions League
2	Petro de Luanda (Q)	30	21	4	5	47	17	+30	67	Qualification for Champions League
3	Primeiro de Agosto (Q)	30	19	7	4	54	23	+31	64	Qualification for Confederation Cup
4	Bravos do Maquis (Note: Bravos do Maquis was awarded 6 points and 3–0 wins against Santa Rita and Desportivo da Huíla in the 11th and 6th round matches, respectively.)	30	15	10	5	43	23	+20	55	
5	Interclube (Note: Santa Rita was awarded a 3–0 win against Interclube as Interclube failed to produce valid licences in their away match against Santa Rita.)	30	11	11	8	35	22	+13	44	

Updated to match(es) played on 31 July 2021. Source: Girabola.com Girabola, SOCCERWAY
Rules for classification: 1) Points; 2) Head-to-head points; 3) Goal difference; 4) Head-to-head goal difference; 5) Goals scored; 6) Fair-play points; 7) Play-off.
(C) Champions; (Q) Qualified to the phase indicated

=== Match details ===
Tue, 29 Dec 2020 01	1º de Agosto	1–0	Interclube	11 de Novembro, Luanda
17:00 WAT (UTC+1)	Moya 57'			Referee: António Dungula; Jerson Emiliano, Wilson Ntyamba
Note: Neblú / Bobo (c), Bonifácio, Jó (substituted off) 34', Mira, Natael (substituted off) 45' / Herenilson (substituted off) 46', Mário, Mongo (substituted off) 72' / Moya, Zini (substituted off) 88' — Giovani (substituted on) 34', Paizo (substituted on) 45', Macaia (substituted on) 46', Melono (substituted on) 72', Catraio (substituted on) 88'

Sun, 07 Feb 2021 09	1º de Agosto	1–0	Petro Atlético	11 de Novembro, Luanda
17:00 WAT (UTC+1)	Matuwila 86' (o.g.)			Referee: Bernardo Nangolo; Ivanildo Martins, Evanildo Lopes
Note: Tony (c) / Bobo, Bonifácio, Isaac (substituted off) 53', Paizo / Herenilson, Macaia, Mário (substituted off) 74', Mongo (substituted off) 54' / Mabululu (substituted off) 86', Moya (substituted off) 75'— Mira (substituted on) 53', Buá (substituted on) 54', Edmilson (substituted on) 74', Zini (substituted on) 75', Atouba (substituted on) 86'

Thu, 10 Feb 2021 08	Bravos do Maquis	3–2	1º de Agosto	11 de Novembro (Note: Match to be played at away court for mutual agreement. Home court rule to be reversed on the 2nd leg match), Luanda
17:00 WAT (UTC+1)	Benarfa 44', 80'; Da Banda 50'		16' Mário; 90+2' Mabululu	Referee: Feliciano Lucas; Nicodemos Calembela, Alexandre Bengue
Note: Tony (c) / Bobo, Bonifácio, Mira, Paizo (substituted off) 64' / Edmilson (substituted off) 64', Herenilson (substituted off) 45', Mário, Mongo (substituted off) 78' / Mabululu, Zini — Moya (substituted on) 45', Natael (substituted on) 64', Buá (substituted on) 64', Atouba (substituted on) 78'

Thu, 18 Feb 2021 11	1º de Agosto	2–0	Académica	11 de Novembro, Luanda
17:00 WAT (UTC+1)	Libero (o.g.); Buá 90+4'			Referee: Mbunga Nkanzi; Sérgio David, Tomás Lima
Note: Neblú / Bobo, Bonifácio, Isaac, Paizo / Herenilson (substituted off) 85', Macaia, Mário, Moya (substituted off) 70' / Mabululu (substituted off) 88', Zini — Buá (substituted on) 70', Edmilson (substituted on) 85', Atouba (substituted on) 88'

Mon, 01 Mar 2021 13	1º de Agosto	2–1	Sporting Cabinda	11 de Novembro, Luanda
17:00 WAT (UTC+1)	Mabululu 38', 52'		Lazi 83'	Referee: Paulo Sérgio; Segunda Tchisseque, Ilídio Coimbra
Note: Neblú / Bobo, Bonifácio, Isaac, Paizo (c) / Herenilson (substituted off) 77', Macaia, Mário, Moya (substituted off) 90+4' / Mabululu (substituted off) 77', Zini (substituted off) 43' — Manico (substituted on) 45' (substituted off) 64', Mongo (substituted on) 67', Cirilo (substituted on) 77', Edmilson (substituted on) 77', Mira (substituted on) 90+4'

Sat, 06 Mar 2021 14	S^{ta} Rita de Cássia	0–2	1º de Agosto	4 de Janeiro, Uíge
15:00 WAT (UTC+1)		Report	75' Cirilo; 85' José Macaia	Referee: Chitano Francisco; Rosário Calembela, Luísa Luhaco
Note: Neblú / Bobo, Bonifácio, Isaac, Paizo (c) / Atouba (substituted off) 59', Herenilson, Macaia (substituted off) 87', Mário / Mabululu (substituted off) 78', Moya (substituted off) 87' — Cirilo (substituted on) 59', Melono (substituted on) 78', Dito (substituted on) 87', Edmilson (substituted on) 87'

Sun, 14 Mar 2021 15	Ferrovia Huambo	1–2	1º de Agosto	Estádio do Ferrovia, Huambo
15:00 WAT (UTC+1)	Vingumba 24'		59' Mira; 90+7' Bobo	Referee: Benjamin Andrade; Jerson Emiliano, Wilson Ntyamba
Note: Neblú / Bobo, Bonifácio, Isaac (substituted off) 45', Paizo (c) / Atouba (substituted off) 45', Herenilson, Macaia (substituted off) 82', Mário (substituted off) 67' / Mabululu, Moya — Mira (substituted on) 45' (substituted off) 72', Cirilo (substituted on) 45', Melono (substituted on) 67', Natael (substituted on) 72', Edmilson (substituted on) 82'

Wed, 17 Mar 2021 04	Desportivo Huíla	0–0	1º de Agosto	Estádio do Ferrovia, Lubango
15:30 WAT (UTC+1)				Referee: Hélder Martins; Evanildo Martins, Joaquim da Rocha
Note: Neblú / Bobo, Bonifácio, Natael, Paizo (c) (substituted off) 88' / Herenilson, Macaia, Manico (substituted off) 55', Mário (substituted off) 76' / Mabululu, Moya (substituted off) 45' — Cirilo (substituted on) 45', Melono (substituted on) 55', Atouba (substituted on) 76', Edmilson (substituted on) 88'

Sat, 20 Mar 2021 02	Cuando Cubango	0–2	1º de Agosto	Eucaliptos, Kuito
15:00 WAT (UTC+1)			22' Melono; 69' Mabululu	Referee: Chitano Francisco; Wilson Ntyamba, Luísa Luhaco
Note: Neblú / Bonifácio, Jó, Natael, Paizo (c) (substituted off) 89' / Edmilson (substituted off) 70', Herenilson (substituted off) 89', Manico (substituted off) 56', Mário / Mabululu, Melono (substituted off) 70' — Cirilo (substituted on) 56', Bito (substituted on) 70', Macaia (substituted on) 70', Mona (substituted on) 89', Duarte (substituted on) 89'

Wed, 31 Mar 2021 12	Baixa de Cassanje	0–2	1º de Agosto	1º de Maio, Malanje
15:30 WAT (UTC+1)		Report	28', 49' Mabululu	Referee: Paulo Talaya; Pedro Micolo, Nery da Silva
Note: Neblú / Bito (substituted off) 81', Bonifácio, Jó, Paizo (c) (substituted off) 89' / Atouba (substituted off) 81', Herenilson, Macaia (substituted off) 65', Mona / Mabululu, Melono (substituted off) 65' — Zini (substituted on) 65', Edmilson (substituted on) 65', Manelé (substituted on) 81', Buá (substituted on) 81'

Sat, 03 Apr 2021 10	Rec do Libolo	2–2	1º de Agosto	Estádio Municipal, Calulo
15:00 WAT (UTC+1)	Ning 46', 74'		5' Mabululu; 15' Melono	Referee: Bernardo Nangolo; Pedro Alberto, Jeremias Cafussa
Note: Neblú / Bonifácio, Jó, Mona, Paizo (c) / Atouba (substituted off) 74', Bito, Herenilson, Macaia (substituted off) 65' / Mabululu, Melono (substituted off) 89' — Zini (substituted on) 65', Buá (substituted on) 74', Manelé (substituted on) 89'

Tue, 06 Apr 2021 06	Sagrada	2–1	1º de Agosto	Sagrada Esperança, Dundo
15:30 WAT (UTC+1)	Jó Paciência 29', 57'	Report	69' Aldair	Referee: Feliciano Lucas; Horácio Tchissingue, Alexandre Bengue
Note: Neblú / Bonifácio, Jó, Mona (substituted off) 45', Paizo (c) (substituted off) 45' / Atouba (substituted off) 45', Herenilson, Macaia, Moya / Mabululu, Melono (substituted off) 83' — Zini (substituted on) 45', Buá (substituted on) 45', Aldair (substituted on) 45', Cirilo (substituted on) 83'

Sat, 10 Apr 2021 07	1º de Agosto	2–1	Progresso	11 de Novembro, Luanda
17:00 WAT (UTC+1)	Jó 15'; Mário 27'		73' Julinho	Referee: José Maxia
Note: Neblú / Bobo (c), Bonifácio, Jó, Paizo / Bito (substituted off) 60', Edmilson, Herenilson, Mário / Mabululu (substituted off) 60', Zini — Moya (substituted on) 60', Melono (substituted on) 60'

Tue, 13 Apr 2021 05	1º de Agosto	4–0	Rec da Caála	11 de Novembro, Luanda
17:00 WAT (UTC+1)	Bobo 21'; Bito 31', 90+1'; Zini 47'			Referee: José Maxia; Cláudio Vunge, Flávio Dias
Note: Neblú / Bobo (c), Bonifácio, Jó, Natael (substituted off) 82' / Bito, Edmilson (substituted off) 82', Herenilson (substituted off) 60', Mário / Moya (substituted off) 71', Zini (substituted off) 71' — Aldair (substituted on) 60', Mabululu (substituted on) 71', Melono (substituted on) 71', Asumani (substituted on) 82', Paizo (substituted on) 82'

Sun, 18 Apr 2021 03	1º de Agosto	2–2	Wiliete SC	11 de Novembro, Luanda
17:00 WAT (UTC+1)	Zini 40', 60'		8' Bugos; 18' Jó	Referee: Mbunga Nkazi; Sérgio Manuel, Tomás Lima
Note: Neblú / Bobo (c), Jó, Mona (substituted off) 70', Paizo / Bito (substituted off) 59', Edmilson (substituted off) 70', Mário, Moya / Melono (substituted off) 80', Zini — Mabululu (substituted on) 59', Isaac (substituted on) 70', Herenilson (substituted on) 70', Cirilo (substituted on) 80'

Wed, 24 Apr 2021 16	Interclube	0–1	1º de Agosto	22 de Junho, Luanda
15:00 WAT (UTC+1)			52' Moya	Referee: José Álvaro; Estanislau Guedes, Rosário Calembela
Note: Neblú / Bobo (c), Bonifácio, Mona, Paizo / Edmilson (substituted off) 69', Herenilson, Mário (substituted off) 87', Moya (substituted off) 56' / Melono, Zini — Bito (substituted on) 45', Mabululu (substituted on) 56', Atouba (substituted on) 69', Macaia (substituted on) 87'

Sun, 2 May 2021 17	1º de Agosto	2–0	Cuando Cubango	11 de Novembro, Luanda
17:00 WAT (UTC+1)	Paizo 42'; Bobo 67'			Referee: Sabino de Carvalho; Ladislau Miguel, Celestino Golombole
Note: Neblú / Bobo, Bonifácio, Mona (substituted off) 28', Paizo (c) / Bito, Herenilson (substituted off) 80', Mário (substituted off) 28', Moya (substituted off) 67' / Mabululu, Melono (substituted off) 67' — Asumani (substituted on) 28', Isaac (substituted on) 28', Cirilo (substituted on) 67', Edmilson (substituted on) 67', Buá (substituted on) 80'

Sun, 09 May 2021 18	Wiliete SC	1–1	1º de Agosto	Ombaka, Benguela
15:00 WAT (UTC+1)	Zeca 59'		67' Bito
Note: Neblú / Bobo, Bonifácio, Isaac, Paizo (c) / Bito (substituted off) 86', Edmilson, Herenilson (substituted off) 60', Mário (substituted off) 73' / Mabululu (substituted off) 73', Zini — Moya (substituted on) 60', Asumani (substituted on) 73', Melono (substituted on) 73', Cirilo (substituted on) 86'

Sun, 12 May 2021 19	1º de Agosto	2–0	Desportivo Huíla	11 de Novembro, Luanda
17:30 WAT (UTC+1)	Melono 67'; Mabululu 74'
Note: Neblú / Bobo, Bonifácio, Isaac, Paizo (c) / Bito, Edmilson (substituted off) 45', Herenilson (substituted off) 45', Moya (substituted off) 65' / Mabululu, Zini (substituted off) 45' — Asumani (substituted on) 45', Mário (substituted on) 45', Melono (substituted on) 45', Cirilo (substituted on) 65'

Wed, 16 May 2021 20	Rec da Caála	1–2	1º de Agosto	Mártires da Canhala, Caála
15:00 WAT (UTC+1)	Depú 76'	Report	20', 90' Zini	Referee: Nuno Nsumbo; Manuel Benguela, Nilton Armando
Note: Neblú / Bobo (c), Bonifácio, Isaac (substituted off) 66', Mona / Bito (substituted off) 78', Edmilson (substituted off) 45', Herenilson (substituted off) 45', Mário / Mabululu, Zini (substituted off) 45' — Melono (substituted on) 45', Macaia (substituted on) 45', Dani (substituted on) 66', Cirilo (substituted on) 78'

Sun, 23 May 2021 21	1º de Agosto	0–0	Sagrada	11 de Novembro, Luanda
17:00 WAT (UTC+1)				Referee: António Dungula; Carlos Caliongo, Tito Capingala
Note: Neblú / Bobo, Bonifácio, Mona (substituted off) 65', Paizo / Asumani, Mário, Moya / Mabululu (substituted off) 65', Melono (substituted off) 79', Zini (substituted off) 79' — Bito (substituted on) 65', Isaac (substituted on) 65', Herenilson (substituted on) 79', Cirilo (substituted on) 79'

Sat, 29 May 2021 22	Progresso	0–1	1º de Agosto	Coqueiros, Luanda
16:30 WAT (UTC+1)			25' Mabululu	Referee: Ailton Carmelino; Júlio Lemos, Ivanildo Martins
Note: Neblú / Bonifácio, Dani, Isaac, Paizo / Asumani (substituted off) 73', Bito (substituted off) 90+3', Herenilson (substituted off) 74', Mário / Mabululu (substituted off) 87', Zini — Macaia (substituted on) 73', Melono (substituted on) 74', Cirilo (substituted on) 87', Jó (substituted on) 90+3'

Sat, 5 Jun 2021 23	1º de Agosto	0–0	Bravos do Maquis	Mundunduleno, Luena
15:00 WAT (UTC+1)				Referee: João Goma; Ivanildo Lopes, António Teixeira
Note: Neblú / Bobo, Dani (c), Isaac (substituted off) 80', Paizo / Asumani (substituted off) 45', Bito, Herenilson, Mário / Mabululu, Melono — Cirilo (substituted on) 65', Mona (substituted on) 80', Manelé (substituted on) 80'

Sat, 12 Jun 2021 24	Petro Atlético	3–0	1º de Agosto	11 de Novembro, Luanda
16:30 WAT (UTC+1)				Referee: Hélder Martins; Jerson Emiliano, Ivanildo Lopes
Note: Neblú / Bobo, Dani (c), Isaac (substituted off) 54', Paizo / Asumani (substituted off) 45', Bito, Herenilson, Mário / Mabululu, Melono (substituted off) 54' — Moya (substituted on) 45', Mona (substituted on) 54', Zini (substituted on) 54' (substituted off) 79', Manelé (substituted on) 79'

Sat, 26 Jun 2021 26	Académica	3–1	1º de Agosto	Ombaka, Benguela
15:30 WAT (UTC+1)	Ady 6'; Mano Mano 19'; Makusa 90+4'		90+3' Bobo
Note: Neblú / Bobo, Bonifácio, Jó, Paizo (c) / Herenilson, Jeremias (substituted off) 45', Mona (substituted off) 81', Moya / Catraio (substituted off) 39', Melono — Cirilo (substituted on) 39', Manico (substituted on) 45', Manilson (substituted on) 81'

Wed, 30 Jun 2021 27	1º de Agosto	3–0	Baixa de Cassanje	11 de Novembro, Luanda
17:00 WAT (UTC+1)	Moya 33' (pen.), 52'; Mário 44'
Note: Neblú / Bobo, Bonifácio (substituted off) 60', Mona, Paizo (c) / Cirilo (substituted off) 45', Herenilson, Macaia (substituted off) 72', Mário / Melono, Moya (substituted off) 72' — Mabululu (substituted on) 45', Dani (substituted on) 60', Buá (substituted on) 72', Manico (substituted on) 72'

Sun, 16 Jul 2021 25	1º de Agosto	1–1	Rec do Libolo	11 de Novembro, Luanda
17:00 WAT (UTC+1)	Zini 71'		50' Lukeba

Mon, 19 Jul 2021 28	Sporting Cabinda	0–4	1º de Agosto	Tafe, Cabinda
15:30 WAT (UTC+1)			42', 51' Zini; 43' Mário; 60' Bito	Referee: Paulo Talaya
Note: Neblú / Dani (c), Jó, Mona, Natael / Buá (substituted off) 72', Cirilo (substituted off) 67', Macaia, Mário (substituted off) 72' / Bito (substituted off) 81', Zini (substituted off) 81' — Manelé (substituted on) 67', Atouba (substituted on) 72', Manilson (substituted on) 72', Mira (substituted on) 81', Aldair (substituted on) 81'

Sat, 24 Jul 2021 29	1º de Agosto	4–2	S^{ta} Rita de Cássia	11 de Novembro, Luanda
15:00 WAT (UTC+1)	Zini 2', 42', 52'; Atouba 56'		43' Paulo; 84' Papel	Referee: Nuno Eduardo; Joaquim Chio, Lucas Caliongo
Note: Neblú / Dani (c) (substituted off) 58', Jó, Mona, Natael / Buá (substituted off) 45', Cirilo (substituted off) 45', Macaia (substituted off) 58', Mário / Bito (substituted off) 58', Zini — Ansumani (substituted on) 45', Atouba (substituted on) 45', Aldair (substituted on) 58', Manilson (substituted on) 58', Oldair (substituted on) 58'

Sat, 31 Jul 2021 30	1º de Agosto	4–1	Ferrovia Huambo	22 de Junho, Luanda
15:00 WAT (UTC+1)	Bito 24'; Natael 31'; Zini 67'; Edú 85' (o.g.)		73' Benvindo	Referee: Hélder Martins
Note: Nsesani / Dani (c) (substituted off) 71', Jó, Mona, Natael / Atouba (substituted off) 62', Cirilo (substituted off) 70', Macaia, Manilson / Bito (substituted off) 81', Zini — Buá (substituted on) 62', Jeremias (substituted on) 70', Odair (substituted on) 71', Manico (substituted on) 81'

=== Results ===
==== Results by round ====
Round	1	2	3	4	5	6	7	8	9	10	11	12	13	14	15	16	17	18	19	20	21	22	23	24	25	26	27	28	29	30
Ground	H	A	H	A	H	A	H	A	A	A	H	A	H	A	A	A	H	A	H	A	H	A	H	H	H	A	H	A	H	H
Result	W							L	W		W		W	W																
Position	3																													

Updated to match(es) played on 7 March 2021. Source: girabolazap.co.ao
A = Away; H = Home; W = Win; D = Draw; L = Loss

==== Results summary ====
Overall								Home						Away					
Pld	W	D	L	GF	GA	GD	Pts	W	D	L	GF	GA	GD	W	D	L	GF	GA	GD
5	4	0	1	8	4	+4	12	4	0	0	6	1	+5	0	0	1	2	3	−1

Last updated: 28 February 2021.

== CAF Champions League & Confederation Cup ==
=== Results summary ===
Overall								Home						Away					
Pld	W	D	L	GF	GA	GD	Pts	W	D	L	GF	GA	GD	W	D	L	GF	GA	GD
0	0	0	0	0	0	0	0	0	0	0	0	0	0	0	0	0	0	0	0

Last updated: 23 December 2020.

=== Playoff round ===
The COVID-19 policy of the Angolan health authorities was not aligned with that of CAF and as a result, following 4 Namungo players having tested positive for COVID-19, the Angolan health authorities ruled that the match was not to be held. As part of the COVID-19 protocol in use in Angola, Namungo FC claimed to have been subject to inhuman, harsh treatment from the Angolan authorities. CAF ruled that both matches were to take place in Tanzania, even though they acknowledged that none of the clubs were to blame for the match not being held. D'Agosto feared that some kind of retaliation was expected from the Tanzanian side for the alleged inhuman treatment that they had allegedly been subject to in Luanda. Only ninety minutes away from the first leg match, the Tanzanian health authorities announced that five D'Agosto players had tested positive for COVID-19, a confirmation test or one by an independent lab was denied and D'Agosto was in disbelief when it was announced that the five players were no other than the five most influential players in the team, all of whom from the initial line-up, including goal-keeper Neblú, centrebacks Bobo Ungenda and Bonifácio Caetano, central midfielder Mário Balbúrdia and the team's top scorer Mabululu. The stage had carefully been set for an easy win by Namungo, with the aggravating circumstance that the D'Agosto players in the makeshift team that was hastily assembled for the match, were psychologically affected by the way that their teammates were discarded.

Thu, 25 Feb 2021 PO 2L	Namungo (Tanzania)	1–3	(Angola) 1º de Agosto	Chamazi, Dar es Salaam
17:00 EAT (UTC+3)	Sabilo 7'		27', 51' Moya; 90+3' Jó	Referee: Andofetra Rakotojaona; Lionel Andrianantenaina, Pierre Andrivoavonjy (Madagascar)
Note: Tony (c) / Isaac, Jó, Mira, Natael / Atouba, Edmilson, Herenilson, Mongo (substituted off) 73' / Manico, Moya — Buá (substituted on) 73'

Sun, 21 Feb 2021 PO 1L	1º de Agosto (Angola)	2–6	(Tanzania) Namungo	Chamazi, Dar es Salaam
17:00 EAT (UTC+3)	Moya 12'; Zini 50'	Report	32' Manyanya; 38', 59' Sabilo; 55' Lusajo; 66' Kwizera; 72' Sey	Referee: Mohamed Elsaid; Ahmed Hossam, Hany Elsnadidy (Egypt)
Note: Tony (c) / Edmilson (substituted off) 66', Isaac, Jó, Paizo (substituted off) 57' / Buá (substituted off) 57', Herenilson, Macaia, Mongo / Moya (substituted off) 82', Zini — Manico (substituted on) 57', Natael (substituted on) 57', Atouba (substituted on) 66', Melono (substituted on) 82'

=== Results summary ===
Overall								Home						Away					
Pld	W	D	L	GF	GA	GD	Pts	W	D	L	GF	GA	GD	W	D	L	GF	GA	GD
2	0	1	1	0	1	−1	1	0	0	1	0	1	−1	0	1	0	0	0	0

Last updated: 23 December 2020.

Tue, 05 Jan 2021 R1 2L	1º de Agosto (Angola)	0–1	(South Africa) Kaizer Chiefs	11 de Novembro, Luanda
16:00 WAT (UTC+1)			41' Castro	Referee: Brighton Chimene; Tafadzwa Nkala, Luckson Mhara (Zimbabwe)
Note: Tony Cabaça (c) / Bobo, Bonifácio (substituted off) 71', Isaac (substituted off) 85', Natael / Buá (substituted off) 45', Macaia, Manico (substituted off) 58', Mário / Mabululu (substituted off) 85', Moya — Atouba (substituted on) 45', Giovani (substituted on) 58', Zini (substituted on) 71', Mongo (substituted on) 85', Mira (substituted on) 85'

Wed, 23 Dec 2020 R1 1L	Kaizer Chiefs (South Africa)	0–0	(Angola) 1º de Agosto	FNB Stadium, Johannesburg
18:00 SAST (UTC+2)				Referee: Ibrahim Tsimanohitsy, Andriatianarivelo, Harizo (Madagascar)
Note: Neblú / Bobo, Isaac, Jó, Natael / Atouba (substituted off) 87', Boni, Herenilson, Mongo (c) (substituted off) 74' / Mabululu (substituted off) 74', Moya (substituted off) 90+5' — Mário (substituted on) 74', Zini (substituted on) 74', Macaia (substituted on) 87', Manico (substituted on) 90+5'

== Angola Cup ==
=== Round of 16 ===
Wed, 02 Jun 2021 R16	Jovens de Hoje	2–6	1º de Agosto	Mangueiras, Saurimo
15:00 WAT (UTC+1)	Gorbacé 16'; Benjamin 43'	Report	5' Jó; 20' Melono; 46' Aldair; 53' Manelé; 58' Catraio; 79' (pen.) Mabululu	Referee: Bernardo Moreira; Aldair Carmelino, Evandro da Rocha
Note: Moio / Fernando (substituted off) 65', Jó, Mona, Natael (c) / Aldair (substituted off) 70', Cirilo (substituted off) 69', Macaia (substituted off) 65', Manelé / Catraio (substituted off) 65', Melono — Herenilson (substituted on) 65', Mabululu (substituted on) 65', Mário (substituted on) 65', Bito (substituted on) 69', Dani (substituted on) 70'

=== Quarter-finals ===
Wed, 23 Jun 2021 QF	Bravos do Maquis	2–3	1º de Agosto	Mundunduleno, Luena
15:00 WAT (UTC+1)	Estevão 51'; Da Banda 57'	Report	8', 20' Moya; 29' Melono	Referee: Benjamin Andrade; Bernabé Ngulo, Manuel Benguela
Note: Neblú / Bobó, Bonifácio, Jó, Paizo (c) / Cirilo (substituted off) 62', Herenilson, Mona (substituted off) 77', Moya / Catraio (substituted off) 77', Melono (substituted off) 90' — Manico (substituted on) 62', Odair (substituted on) 77', Manilson (substituted on) 77', Jeremias (substituted on) 90'

=== Semi-finals ===
Thu, 08 Jul 2021 SF	1º de Agosto	0–2	Petro de Luanda	11 de Novembro, Luanda
16:30 WAT (UTC+1)			15' Maya; 88' Yano	Referee: José Chitumba; Estanislau Guedes, Rosário Calembela
Note: Neblú / Bobó, Bonifácio, Dani (c), Mona (substituted off) 79' / Cirilo, Herenilson (substituted off) 45', Macaia, Mário / Melono (substituted off) 45', Moya (substituted off) 77' — Buá (substituted on) 45', Mabululu (substituted on) 45', Atouba (substituted on) 77', Jó (substituted on) 79'

== Statistics ==
=== Appearances ===
As of 31 July 2021

No.	Pos.	Nat.	Name	Girabola		Angola Cup		CAF Champions League		Total	
No.	Pos.	Nat.	Name	Mins	Apps	Mins	Apps	Mins	Apps	Mins	Apps
22	GK	(Angola)	Neblú	2430	27	180	2	90	1	2700	30
6	DF	(Angola)	Bonifácio	2105	24	180	2	161	2	2446	28
4	DF	(Democratic Republic of the Congo)	Bobo	1980	22	180	2	180	2	2340	26
18	MF	(Angola)	Herenilson	1907	24(3)	160	2(1)	270	3	2337	29(4)
8	MF	(Angola)	Mário	2052	24(1)	115	1(1)	106	1(1)	2273	26(3)
19	DF	(Angola)	Paizo	2025	23(1)	90	1	57	1	2172	25(1)
26	FW	(Angola)	Mabululu	1798	20(3)	70	(2)	159	2	2027	22(5)
11	FW	(Honduras)	Moya	1429	17(4)	167	2	352	4	1948	23(4)
20	MF	(Angola)	Zini	1487	16(6)			125	1(2)	1612	17(8)
16	MF	(Angola)	Macaia	1247	14(5)	155	2	151	2(1)	1553	18(6)
15	DF	(Angola)	Jó	1024	12(1)	180	2(1)	270	3	1474	17(2)
7	MF	(Angola)	Bito	1351	16(5)	53	(2)			1404	16(7)
28	FW	(Angola)	Melono	1158	12(9)	236	3	8	(1)	1402	15(10)
23	DF	(Angola)	Mona	1125	13(4)	257	3			1382	16(4)
21	DF	(Angola)	Isaac	945	11(2)	0	0	355	4	1300	15(2)
3	DF	(Angola)	Natael	711	8(2)	90	1	303	3(1)	1104	12(3)
27	MF	(Angola)	Edmilson	724	9(7)	0	0	156	2	880	11(7)
10	MF	(Cameroon)	Atouba	527	7(7)	13	(1)	246	2(2)	831	9(10)
7	MF	(Angola)	Cirilo	640	5(15)	179	3	0	0	819	8(15)
5	DF	(Angola)	Dani	633	7(2)	110	1(1)	0	0	743	8(3)
9	MF	(Angola)	Buá	350	2(1)	45	(1)	119	2(1)	514	4(3)
13	MF	(Democratic Republic of the Congo)	Mongo	227	3(1)	0	0	242	3(1)	469	6(2)
25	MF	(Democratic Republic of the Congo)	Asumani	465	4(5)	0	0	0	0	465	4(5)
12	GK	(Angola)	Tony	180	2	0	0	270	3	450	5
30	MF	(Angola)	Manico	184	2(4)	25	(1)	213	2(2)	422	4(7)
2	DF	(Angola)	Mira	278	2(5)	0	0	95	1(1)	373	3(6)
35	MF	(Angola)	Manilson	174	1(4)	13	(1)	0	0	187	1(5)
37	MF	(Angola)	Aldair	116	(3)	70	1	0	0	186	1(3)
24	MF	(Angola)	Catraio	41	1(1)	142	2	0	0	183	3(1)
33	MF	(Angola)	Manelé	74	(6)	90	1	0	0	164	1(6)
1	GK	(Angola)	Coio			90	1			90	1
1	GK	(Angola)	Nsesani	90	1					90	1
17	MF	(Democratic Republic of the Congo)	Giovani	56	(2)	0	0	32	(1)	88	(3)
36	MF	(Angola)	Jeremias	65	1(1)	2	(1)	0	0	67	1(2)
14	MF	(Angola)	Duarte	1	(1)	65	1	0	0	66	1(2)
34	DF	(Angola)	Odair	51	(2)	13	(1)	0	0	64	(3)

=== Scorers ===
As of July 31 2021

P.	Pos.	Nat.	Name	Girabola		Angola Cup		CAF Champions League		Total	
P.	Pos.	Nat.	Name	Mins	Gls	Mins	Gls	Mins	Gls	Mins	Gls
1	FW	(Angola)	Zini	1487	12	0	0	125	1	1612	13
2	FW	(Angola)	Mabululu	1798	9	70	1	159	0	2027	10
3	FW	(Honduras)	Moya	1429	4	167	2	352	3	1948	9
4	FW	(Angola)	Melono	1158	3	236	2	8	0	1402	5
5	MF	(Angola)	Bito	1351	5	53	0	0	0	1404	5
6	MF	(Angola)	Mário	2052	4	115	0	106	0	2273	4
7	DF	(Democratic Republic of the Congo)	Bobo	1980	4	180	0	180	0	2340	4
8	DF	(Angola)	Jó	1024	1	180	1	270	1	1474	3
9	MF	(Angola)	Aldair	116	1	70	1	0	0	186	2
10	MF	(Angola)	Manelé	74	0	90	1	0	0	164	1
11	FW	(Angola)	Catraio	41	0	142	1	0	0	183	1
12	DF	(Angola)	Mira	278	1	0	0	95	0	373	1
13	MF	(Angola)	Buá	350	1	45	0	119	0	514	1
14	MF	(Angola)	Cirilo	640	1	179	0	0	0	819	1
15	MF	(Cameroon)	Atouba	572	1	13	0	246	0	831	1
16	DF	(Angola)	Natael	711	1	90	0	303	0	1104	1
17	MF	(Angola)	Macaia	1247	1	155	0	151	0	1553	1
18	DF	(Angola)	Paizo	2025	1	90	0	57	0	2172	1
Opponents				0	4	0	0	0	0	0	4
Total					54		9		5		68

=== Assists ===
As of 17 February 2021

P	Pos.	Nat.	Name	Girabola		Angola Cup		CAF Champions League		Total	
P	Pos.	Nat.	Name	Apps	Asts	Apps	Asts	Apps	Asts	Apps	Asts
1	DF	(Angola)	Mira	2(1)	1	0	0	0	0	2(2)	1
1	DF	(Angola)	Zini	3(1)	1	0	0	0	0	3(3)	1
2	MF	(Honduras)	Moya	3(1)	1	0	0	2	0	5(1)	1
Total					3		0		0		3

=== Clean sheets ===
As of 17 February 2021

P.	No.	Nat.	Name	Girabola		Angola Cup		CAF Champions League		Total	
P.	No.	Nat.	Name	Apps	CS	Apps	CS	Apps	CS	Apps	CS
1	22	(Angola)	Neblú	2	2	0	0	1	1	3	3
2	12	(Angola)	Tony Cabaça	2	1	0	0	1	0	3	1
3	1	(Angola)	Nsesani	0	0	0	0	0	0	0	0
Total					3		0		1		4

=== Disciplinary record ===
As of 7 February 2021

P.	Pos.	Nat.	Name	Girabola			Angola Cup			CAF Champions League			Total		
P.	Pos.	Nat.	Name	Yellow card	Double yellow card	Red card	Yellow card	Double yellow card	Red card	Yellow card	Double yellow card	Red card	Yellow card	Double yellow card	Red card
1	DF	(Democratic Republic of the Congo)	Bobo	1						1			2		
1	DF	(Angola)	Isaac	2									2		
2	DF	(Angola)	Natael							1			1		
2	DF	(Angola)	Bonifácio	1									1		
2	GK	(Angola)	Tony Cabaça	1									1		
2	MF	(Democratic Republic of the Congo)	Mongo	1									1		
–	GK	(Angola)	Nsesani												
–	DF	(Angola)	Dani												
–	MF	(Angola)	Mário												
–	MF	(Angola)	Buá												
–	DF	(Angola)	Jó												
–	MF	(Angola)	Macaia												
–	DF	(Angola)	Paizo												
–	FW	(Honduras)	Moya												
–	FW	(Angola)	Mabululu												
Total				6						2			8		

=== Season progress ===
23/12	29/12	5/1	7/2	10/2	17/2	21/2	25/2	1/3
KAI	INT	KAI	PET	MAQ	ACA	NAM	NAM	SCC
0–0	1–0	0–1	1–0	3–2	2–0	2–6	1–3	2–1
CH	GB	CH	Girabola			Champions		GB

== See also ==
- List of C.D. Primeiro de Agosto players
