= Aguda =

Aguda may refer to:

== People ==
- Aguda people
- In Nigeria, liberated "returnee" Africans from Brazil were commonly known as "Agudas"; see Liberated Africans in Nigeria
- Emperor Taizu of Jin, born Wányán Āgǔdǎ (1068–1123), the founder and first emperor of the Jurchen-led Jin dynasty of China
- Wanyan Aguda (manga artist)
- Akinola Aguda (1923–2001), Nigerian jurist and former Chief Justice of Botswana
- Pemi Aguda, Nigerian writer, architect, and podcast host
- Godwin Aguda (born 1997, Nigerian professional footballer

== Other ==
- Aguda Point, on the west coast of Graham Land, on the Antarctic Peninsula
- Aguda, Portugal, a parish in the municipality of Figueiró dos Vinhos, Portugal
- Aguda or agudah (אגודה) (possessive: agudas or agudath (אגודת)) are Hebrew terms for "union" or "organisation". Organizations known commonly as "Aguda" include:
  - Agudath Israel of America
  - World Agudath Israel
  - Agudas Chasidei Chabad
  - Agudat Israel
  - The Aguda, Israel's national LGBT organization
