= Arfaoui =

Arfaoui is an Arabic surname of North African origin. It is most commonly used in Tunisia.

- Amira Arfaoui (born 1999), Swiss footballer
- Fedi Arfaoui (born 1992), Tunisian footballer
- Latifa Bint Alaya El Arfaoui (born 1961), Tunisian singer
- Rached Arfaoui (born 1996), Tunisian footballer
