= Captain Bashir =

Sudanese footballer (born 1994)

Personal information
- Full name: Captain Bashir Aldukhun Belal
- Date of birth: 1 June 1994 (age 32)
- Place of birth: Sudan
- Position: Defensive midfielder

Team information
- Current team: Jamus FC
- Number: 18

Senior career*
Years	Team	Apps	(Gls)
2013–2014	Al-Nasr SC Omdurman		
2015–2018	Al-Nesoor SC		
2018–2022	Alamal Atbara		
2022-2023	Al-Merrikh SC		
2023-2024	Al-Fallah Club		
2024-	Jamus FC		

International career^{‡}
2022–	Sudan	2	(0)
- * Club domestic league appearances and goals as of 18:26, 4 June 2024 (UTC) ‡ National team caps and goals as of 18:26, 9 January 2022 (UTC)

Captain Bashir Aldukhun Belal (Arabic: كابتن بشير; born 1 June 1994), known as just Captain Bashir, is a Sudanese professional footballer who plays as a defensive midfielder for the South Sudan club Jamus FC and the Sudan national team.

== International career ==
Bashir made his international debut with the Sudan national team in a 0–0 friendly tie with Zimbabwe on 2 January 2022. He was part of the Sudan squad that was called up for the 2021 Africa Cup of Nations.
