= Fahmi Ben Romdhane =

Tunisian footballer

Personal information
- Date of birth: 12 December 1990 (age 35)
- Place of birth: Monastir, Tunisia
- Height: 1.75 m (5 ft 9 in)
- Position: Defender

Team information
- Current team: ES Tunis
- Number: 30

Senior career*
Years	Team	Apps	(Gls)
2009–2012	US Monastir		
2012	EGS Gafsa		
2013	ES Hammam-Sousse		
2013–2016	CS Hammam-Lif		
2016–2017	CS Sfaxien		
2017	AS Marsa		
2017	US Monastir		
2017–	ES Tunis	55	(6)
- * Club domestic league appearances and goals as of 17:05, 11 December 2021 (UTC)

Fahmi Ben Romdhane (born 12 December 1990) is a Tunisian football midfielder and later defender who currently plays for ES Tunis. (Note: Fahmi Ben Romdhane at WorldFootball.net)

== Career ==
Ben Romhane joined ES Tunis in the 2017–18 season.

== Honours ==
ES Tunis

- Tunisian Super Cup: 2020–21
