= Thierry Tchuenté =

Cameroonian footballer

Personal information
- Date of birth: 27 March 1992 (age 34)
- Place of birth: Cameroon
- Height: 1.90 m (6 ft 3 in)
- Position: Midfielder

Senior career*
| Years | Team | Apps | (Gls) |
| 2019–2020 | Cotonsport | - | (-) |
| 2020–2022 | CS Chebba | 17 | (2) |
| 2020–2021 | → Cotonsport (loan) | - | (-) |
| 2022 | Al-Dahab | | |

International career^{‡}
| 2009 | Cameroon U17 | | |
| 2021– | Cameroon | 4 | (0) |
- * Club domestic league appearances and goals ‡ National team caps and goals as of 22 March 2021

Thierry Tchuenté (born 27 March 1992) is a Cameroonian footballer who plays as a midfielder. In January 2020, Tchuente signed a two-and-a-half-year contract with CS Chebba.
