= Brian Aheebwa =

Ugandan footballer (born 1998)

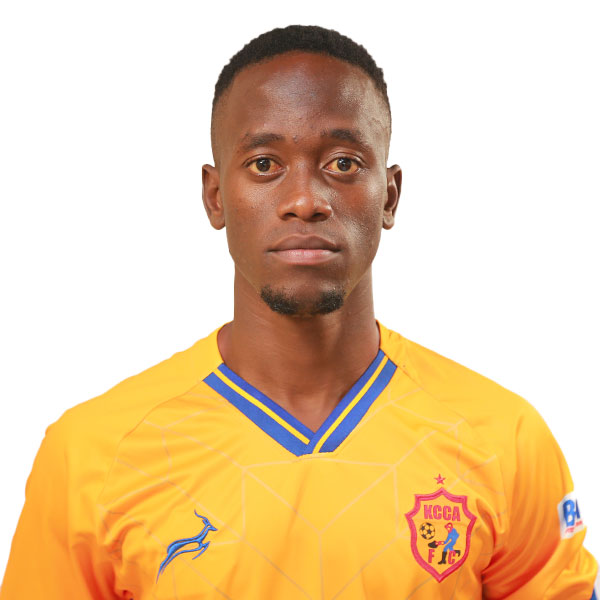
- Aheebwa with KCCA in 2020

Personal information
- Full name: Brian Aheebwa
- Date of birth: 1 July 1998 (age 28)
- Place of birth: Kibaale, Uganda
- Position: Forward

Team information
- Current team: Arba Minch City
- Number: 7

Youth career
- 2009–2014: St. John Bosco Seminary
- 2014–2016: Mbarara Sports Acacdemy

Senior career*
Years	Team	Apps	(Gls)
2016–2020	Mbarara City	79	(32)
2020–2023	KCCA	38	(8)
2023–2024	Kitara	27	(4)
2024–2025	Arba Minch City	25	(12)

International career^{‡}
2021	Uganda	3	(0)
- * Club domestic league appearances and goals as of 13 January 2020 ‡ National team caps and goals as of 22:14, 13 January 2020 (UTC)

Brian Aheebwa (born 1 July 1998) is a Ugandan professional footballer who plays as a striker for Ethiopian Premier League club Arba Minch City, and the Uganda national team.

== Youth career ==
At an early age, he was a member of St. John Bosco Seminary School and in 2014 joined Mbarara Sports Academy until 2016.

== Career ==
=== Mbarara FC (2016-2020) ===
Aheebwa joined Mbarara City FC in 2016 graduating from Mbarara Sports Academy. He signed a 4year contract upon joining Mbarara City FC, In 2016, he was the Regional League top scorer with eight goals. He made his Big League 2017 debut for Mbarara City FC against Kireka United FC. He scored his first goal against Masavu FC in March 2017. On 9 April 2017 he scored four goals for Mbarara City FC against Nyamityobora FC. He scored 39 goals during his four-year tenure he was at Mbarara City FC.

=== KCCA FC ===
In June 2020 he joined KCCA FC and signed a 3-year contract. On 3 December 2020, he made his debut for KCCA FC against Bright Stars FC. He scored his first goal for K.C.C.A FC in that game, K.C.C.A FC won 2–1.

== Personal life ==
Aheebwa was born on 1 July 1998 in Kibale District. He attended Kahunde Primary School, St. John Bosco Seminary Secondary School in Hoima before joining St. Kirigwajjo Secondary School where he received his UCE. Between 2014 and 2015, Aheebwa was admitted to Mayanja Memorial Medical Training Institute where he graduated with a certificate in Nursing thus a certified clinical officer.
