= Kunle Odunlami =

Nigerian footballer

Personal information
- Full name: Kunle Ebenezer Odunlami
- Date of birth: 5 March 1991 (age 35)
- Place of birth: Nigeria
- Height: 1.87 m (6 ft 1 1/2 in)
- Position: Defender

Senior career*
Years	Team	Apps	(Gls)
2011–2013	First Bank F.C.	54	(3)
2013–2016	Sunshine Stars F.C.	89	(11)
2016–2018	FC Botoșani	10	(2)
2018–2019	Gokulam Kerala FC	0	(0)
2019-2021	Rivers United	51	(1)

International career^{‡}
2013–2014	Nigeria	11	(0)
- * Club domestic league appearances and goals as of 20 July 2016 ‡ National team caps and goals as of 11 May 2015

Kunle Odunlami (born 5 March 1990) is a Nigerian former professional footballer who played as a defender.

== International career ==
In January 2014, coach Stephen Keshi, invited him to be included in the Nigeria national football team for the 2014 African Nations Championship team, where he started every match and made the tournament's Best XI as the team placed third.
