= Richard Zumah =

Ghanaian footballer

Personal information
- Full name: Richard Agbalegah Zumah
- Date of birth: July 15, 1997 (age 29)
- Place of birth: Accra, Ghana
- Height: 1.91 m (6 ft 3 in)
- Position: Striker

Team information
- Current team: DHJ
- Number: 28

Senior career*
Years	Team	Apps	(Gls)
2013−2015	Ambah FC	25	(15)
2015−2018	Emmanuel City	15	(11)
2018	Karbalaa	6	(2)
2018−2019	Emmanuel City	20	(17)
2019−2020	Amanat Baghdad	12	(8)
2020−2021	San Pédro	15	(9)
2021−2022	Maritzburg United	7	(2)
2022–2023	ASEC Mimosas	8	(2)
2023−2024	DHJ	7	(01)
- * Club domestic league appearances and goals as of February 20, 2019

Richard Agbalegah Zumah (born 15 July 1997) is a Ghanaian professional footballer who plays as a striker for ASEC Mimosas.

== Club career ==
Zumah started playing with Ambah FC, in 2015 moved to Emmanuel City FC and played with them three seasons, and appeared at an excellent level, which led many clubs to put it under its radar. On 23 February 2018 he began his professional career when he moved to Karbalaa FC for a short time and played the 2018 season in the Iraqi Premier League, and quickly merged with the team, scored a goal against Naft Al-Wasat SC, and scored against Al-Quwa Al-Jawiya. He then returned to Emmanuel City FC, came back to an excellent level and scored several goals for them.

On February 20, 2019, Zumah returned to play in the Iraqi Premier League after moving to Amanat Baghdad Club as a professional player.
