= Grégoire Gael Nkama =

Cameroonian footballer

Grégoire Nkama
Personal information
- Full name: Grégoire Gaël Nkama
- Date of birth: 30 August 1994 (age 32)
- Place of birth: Garoua, Cameroon
- Position: Centre forward

Team information
- Current team: Futuro Kings
- Number: 9

Youth career
- –2012: Achille Sa'a

Senior career*
| Years | Team | Apps | (Gls) |
| 2010–2012 | Achille Sa'a | | |
| 2012–2014 | Panthère Sportive du Ndé | | |
| 2014–2015 | JS Kabylie | | |
| 2020– | Futuro Kings | | |
- * Club domestic league appearances and goals as of 25 December 2013

Grégoire Gaël Nkama (born 30 August 1994) is a Cameroonian footballer who plays as a centre forward for Equatorial Guinean Liga Nacional club Futuro Kings FC.
