= Elvia Ipamy =

Congolese footballer

Personal information
- Full name: Elvia Giovani Ipamy
- Date of birth: 27 September 1994 (age 32)
- Place of birth: Brazzaville, Congo
- Height: 1.75 m (5 ft 9 in)
- Position: Forward

Team information
- Current team: Primeiro de Agosto

Senior career*
Years	Team	Apps	(Gls)
2013–2014	Étoile du Congo		
2015	ACNFF		
2016	Étoile du Congo		
2016–2018	Mangasport		
2018	Jeddah		
2019–2020	TP Mazembe		
2020–	1º de Agosto		

International career^{‡}
2016–2017	Congo	3	(0)
- * Club domestic league appearances and goals as of 1 August 2020 ‡ National team caps and goals as of 1 August 2020

Elvia Ipamy (born 27 September 1994) is a Congolese football striker who plays for Primeiro de Agosto in the Angolan league.

In September 2020, Ipamy joined Angolan side C.D. Primeiro de Agosto.
