= Unisport de Sokodé =

Togolese football club

Unisport de Sokodé is a Togolese football club. They play in the top division in Togolese football. 10,000 capacity Stade Municipal is their home.
