= Olivier Boissy =

French footballer

Personal information
- Full name: Olivier Stephane Boissy
- Date of birth: 22 January 1999 (age 27)
- Place of birth: Dakar, Senegal
- Height: 1.91 m (6 ft 3 in)
- Position: Striker

Team information
- Current team: Stade Poitevin
- Number: 9

Senior career*
Years	Team	Apps	(Gls)
2017	Accra Lions		
2017–2018	Hapoel Petah Tikva B		
2018–2019	Accra Lions		
2020–2021	Salitas	27	(16)
2021–2024	Grenoble	11	(0)
2023	→ Saint-Pryvé (loan)	13	(3)
2024	→ La Roche VF (loan)	12	(5)
2024–2025	La Roche VF	24	(5)
2025	Bourges Foot	10	(2)
2025–	Stade Poitevin	4	(0)

International career^{‡}
2017	Senegal U20	1	(0)
- * Club domestic league appearances and goals as of 4 December 2025 ‡ National team caps and goals as of 7 December 2024

Olivier Stephane Boissy (born 22 January 1999) is a Senegalese professional footballer who plays as a striker for French Championnat National 1 club Stade Poitevin.

== Club career ==
Boissy began his senior career in Ghana with the Accra Lions, before joining the reserve side of Hapoel Petah Tikva in 2017, before returning to Accra Lions again in 2018. He then moved to Salitas in Burkina Faso, scoring 21 goals in all competitions in his first season. On 17 July 2021, he transferred to Grenoble in the French Ligue 2. He made his professional debut with Grenoble in a 4–0 Ligue 2 loss to Paris FC on 24 July 2021.

On 1 February 2023, Boissy was loaned to Saint-Pryvé in Championnat National 2.

== International career ==
Boissy is a youth international for Senegal, having represented the Senegal U20s once in 2017.
