= Jó Vidal =

Angolan footballer

Jó
Personal information
- Full name: Mariano da Costa Vidal
- Date of birth: 20 February 1995 (age 31)
- Position: Defender

Team information
- Current team: Wiliete S.C
- Number: 15

Senior career*
Years	Team	Apps	(Gls)
2017–2018	Desportivo Huíla	24	(1)
2018	Interclube	9	(0)
2019–2020	Progresso	17	(0)
2020–2022	1º de Agosto		
2022-2023	Sagrada Esperança		
2023-	Wiliete S.C		

International career^{‡}
2018–	Angola	2	(0)
- * Club domestic league appearances and goals as of 11:44, 9 July 2019 (UTC) ‡ National team caps and goals as of 11:44, 9 July 2019 (UTC)

Mariano da Costa Vidal (born 20 February 1995), commonly known as Jó, is an Angolan footballer who currently plays as a defender for Primeiro de Agosto in the Angolan league, the Girabola.

In 2018–19, he joined Progresso do Sambizanga in Angola's first league division.

In 2019–20, he signed in for Primeiro de Agosto.

== Career statistics ==
=== Club ===
As of 9 July 2019.

Club	Season	League			Cup		Continental		Other		Total	
Club	Season	Division	Apps	Goals	Apps	Goals	Apps	Goals	Apps	Goals	Apps	Goals
Desportivo Huíla	2017	Girabola	11	1	0	0	–		0	0	11	1
Desportivo Huíla	2018	Girabola	13	0	0	0	–		0	0	13	0
Desportivo Huíla	Total		24	1	0	0	0	0	0	0	24	1
Interclube	2018	Girabola	9	0	0	0	–		0	0	9	0
Progresso	2018–19	Girabola	17	0	2 (Note: Appearances in the Taça de Angola)	0	–		0	0	19	0
Career total			50	1	2	0	0	0	0	0	52	1

=== International ===
As of matches played 23 September 2018.

National team	Year	Apps	Goals
Angola	2018	2	0
Total		2	0
