= Godwin Aguda =

Nigerian footballer (born 1997)

Personal information
- Full name: Wanbe Godwin Aguda
- Date of birth: December 30, 1997 (age 28)
- Height: 1.72 m (5 ft 8 in)
- Position: Forward

Team information
- Current team: Falkenbergs FF
- Number: 30

Senior career*
Years	Team	Apps	(Gls)
2010–2015	Christ Ambassadors	-	(-)
2015–2019	Enugu Rangers	118	(28)
2019–2020	Al-Washm	19	(4)
2020–2021	Rivers United	52	(23)
2021–	Falkenbergs FF	155	(44)
- * Club domestic league appearances and goals as of 11 November 2026

Wanbe Godwin Aguda (born December 30, 1997) is a Nigerian professional footballer who plays as a forward, for Falkenbergs FF in the Swedish Superettan division following his stellar performance with Rivers United in the league and CAF Confederations Cup playoff.

== Career ==
Aguda was named Falkensberg Player of the Year 2022.

Aguda was the top scorer of the 2018-19 CAF Confederation Cup with six goals.

Aguda was named in the NPFL team of the year in 2016.

Lagos FA Cup Winner 2015

Lagos FA Cup MVP 2015

Lagos FA Cup highest goal scorer 2015

== Honours ==
- Nigerian FA Cup (AITEO CUP): 2018
- Nigeria Professional Football League: 2016
- Lagos FA Cup: 2015
