= Fedi Arfaoui =

Tunisian footballer

Personal information
- Date of birth: 7 March 1992 (age 34)
- Height: 1.86 m (6 ft 1 in)
- Position: Defender

Team information
- Current team: US Monastir
- Number: 4

Senior career*
Years	Team	Apps	(Gls)
2012–2013	Espérance		
2013–2014	CS Hammam-Lif		
2014–2015	JS Kairouan		
2015–2017	US Ben Guerdane		
2017–2018	CO Médenine		
2018–	US Monastir		
- * Club domestic league appearances and goals

Fedi Arfaoui (born 7 March 1992) is a Tunisian football defender who currently plays for US Monastir.
