= 2006 Angola Cup =

Tournament details
- Country: Angola
- Dates: 11 Jun – 11 Nov 2006
- Teams: 16

Final positions
- Champions: Primeiro de Agosto
- Runners-up: Benfica Luanda
- 2007 CAF Confederation Cup: Benfica de Luanda (runner-up)

Tournament statistics
- Matches played: 15

The 2006 Taça de Angola was the 25th edition of the Taça de Angola, the second most important and the top knock-out football club competition following the Girabola.

Benfica de Luanda, the runner-up, qualified to the CAF Confederation Cup since Primeiro de Agosto, the winner, contested the CAF Champions League in their capacity as the Girabola winner.

== Stadiums and locations ==
Locations of the 2006 Angola Cup teams

P	Team	Home city	Stadium	Capacity	2005	Current	P
5	Académica do Soyo	Soyo	Estádio dos Imbondeiros	10,000	QF	R16	▼1
5	ASA	Luanda	Estádio da Cidadela	60,000	Champion	R16	▼4
4	Atlético do Namibe	Namibe	Estádio Joaquim Morais	5,000	R16	QF	▲1
2	Benfica de Luanda	Luanda	Estádio dos Coqueiros	8,000	R16	Runner-Up	▲3
5	Benfica do Lubango	Lubango	Estádio da N.Sra do Monte	14,000	PR	R16	▲1
5	Bravos do Maquis	Luena	Estádio Mundunduleno	4,300	DNP	R16	n/a
5	Desportivo da Huíla	Lubango	Estádio do Ferrovia	15,000	R16	R16	Steady
5	Inter do Moxico	Luena	Estádio Mundunduleno	4,300	DNP	R16	n/a
5	Interclube	Luanda	Estádio 22 de Junho	7,000	Runner-Up	R16	▼3
3	Petro de Luanda	Luanda	Estádio da Cidadela	65,000	R16	SF	▲2
1	Primeiro de Agosto	Luanda	Estádio da Cidadela	65,000	SF	Champion	▲2
4	Primeiro de Maio	Benguela	Estádio Edelfride Costa	6,000	QF	QF	Steady
5	Progresso	Luanda	Estádio da Cidadela	65,000	QF	R16	▼1
3	Sagrada Esperança	Dundo	Estádio Sagrada Esperança	8,000	SF	SF	Steady
4	Santos FC	Luanda	Estádio dos Coqueiros	8,000	DNP	QF	n/a
4	Sporting de Cabinda	Cabinda	Estádio do Tafe	25,000	QF	QF	Steady

== Championship bracket ==
The knockout rounds were played according to the following schedule:

- Jun 11: preliminary rounds
- Sep 3 - 27: Round of 16
- Oct 5 - 11: Quarter-finals
- Nov 7/8: Semi-finals
- Nov 11: Final

Preliminary Rounds; 11 Jun 2006
Sun, 11 Jun 2006 Walkover
Inter do Moxico	3
Kakuvas Cunene	0
0
1

1/16 Finals; 3/27 Sep 2006
Wed, 27 Sep 2006
Sporting Cabinda	2
ASA	1
Wed, 27 Sep 2006
Primeiro de Agosto	2
Académica Soyo	1
Sun, 3 Sep 2006
Inter do Moxico	0
Sagrada Esperança	1
Sun, 3 Sep 2006 (pen) a.e.t.
Santos FC	6
Progresso	5
Sun, 3 Sep 2006 (pen) a.e.t.
Primeiro de Maio	4
Desp da Huíla	2
Sun, 3 Sep 2006 (pen) a.e.t.
Benfica Lubango	2
Benfica Luanda	5
Wed, 27 Sep 2006
Interclube	1
Petro de Luanda	2
Sun, 3 Sep 2006
Atlético Namibe	1
Bravos Maquis	0

Quarterfinals; 9 Oct - 5 Nov 2006
Wed, 11 Oct 2006
Sporting Cabinda	0
1º de Agosto	1
Mon, 9 Oct 2006
Sagrada Esperança	3
Santos FC	0
Tue, 10 Oct 2006
Primeiro de Maio	1
Benfica Luanda	2
Sun, 5 Nov 2006
Petro de Luanda	2
Atlético Namibe	1

Semifinals; 7/8 Nov 2006
Tue, 7 Nov 2006 (pen) a.e.t.
Primeiro de Agosto	6
Sagrada Esperança	4
Wed, 8 Nov 2006 (pen) a.e.t.
Benfica Luanda	4
Petro de Luanda	2

Final; 11 Nov 2006
Sun, 11 Nov 2006 (pen) a.e.t.
Primeiro de Agosto	5
Benfica de Luanda	4

== 1/16 finals ==
Sun, 3 Sep 2006 R16	Santos FC	2–2 (a.e.t.) (4–3 p)	Progresso	Luanda
15:00				Stadium: Estádio da Cidadela

Sun, 3 Sep 2006 R16	Primeiro de Maio	0–0 (a.e.t.) (4–2 p)	Desportivo Huíla	Benguela
15:00

Sun, 3 Sep 2006 R16	Inter do Moxico	0–1	Sagrada Esperança	Luena
15:00

Sun, 3 Sep 2006 R16	Atlético do Namibe	1–0	Bravos do Maquis	Namibe
15:00

Sun, 3 Sep 2006 R16	Benfica do Lubango	1–1 (a.e.t.) (1–4 p)	Benfica de Luanda	Lubango
15:00				Stadium: Estádio do Ferrovia

Wed, 27 Sep 2006 R16	1º de Agosto	2–1	Académica do Soyo	Luanda
15:00	Gazeta 13'; Danny 41'		43' Dady	Stadium: Estádio da Cidadela

Wed, 27 Sep 2006 R16	Interclube	1–2	Petro Luanda	Luanda
15:00	André 45'		11' (pen.) Cléber; 73' Bikima	Stadium: Estádio 22 de Junho

Wed, 27 Sep 2006 R16	Sporting Cabinda	2–1	ASA	Cabinda
15:00	Kodjo 16'; Raúl 20'		64' Zinho	Stadium: Estádio do Tafe

== Quarter-finals ==
Mon, 9 Oct 2006 QF	Sagrada Esperança	3–0	Santos FC	Malanje
15:00				Stadium: Estádio 1º de Maio; Referee: Paulo Talaya

Tue, 10 Oct 2006 QF	1º de Maio	1–2	Benfica de Luanda	Benguela
15:30				Stadium: Estádio Municipal

Wed, 11 Oct 2006 QF	Sporting Cabinda	0–2	1º de Agosto	Cabinda
15:30			49' Danny; 68' Milanzi	Stadium: Estádio do Tafe

Sun, 5 Nov 2006 QF	Petro de Luanda	2–1	Atlético do Namibe	Luanda
15:00	Chinho 3' (pen.); Lebo Lebo 82'		83' (pen.) Adolfo	Stadium: Estádio da Cidadela; Attendance: 1,000; Referee: Venâncio de Matos

== Semi-finals ==
Tue, 7 Nov 2006 SF	1º de Agosto	1–1 (5–3 p)	Sagrada Esperança	Luanda
15:00	Danny 3'		37' Sotto	Stadium: Estádio da Cidadela; Referee: João Bastos
	Penalties
	Penalty scored		Penalty missed Penalty scored

Wed, 8 Nov 2006 SF	Benfica Luanda	0–0 (4–2 p)	Petro Luanda	Luanda
15:00		Report		Stadium: Estádio da Cidadela; Referee: Belmiro Carmelino
	Penalties
	Paíto (penalty scored); Totó (penalty scored); Eros (penalty scored); Nato Faial (penalty scored)		(penalty scored) Mbiyavanga; (penalty scored) Miro; (penalty missed) Chara; (penalty missed) Chinho

== Final ==
Sun, 11 November 2006
15:00

Primeiro de Agosto	1–1 (a.e.t.)	Benfica de Luanda
Gazeta 45+1'	Report	62' Vado
Penalties
Riquinho (penalty scored)	4–3	(penalty missed) Eros; (penalty missed) Ekoboló

Estádio da Cidadela, Luanda
Attendance: 10,000
Referee: Pedro dos Santos

D'Agosto	Benfica

GK	–	(Democratic Republic of the Congo) Pitchu
DF	–	(Angola) Elísio	Booked
DF	–	(Angola) Joãozinho
DF	–	(Angola) Kumaca
DF	–	(Angola) Locó
MF	–	(Zambia) Bakala
MF	–	(Angola) Gazeta		Substituted off
MF	–	(Angola) Tião		Substituted off
MF	–	(Angola) Zé Augusto	Booked
FW	–	(Zambia) Danny
FW	–	(Zambia) Milanzi		Substituted off
Substitutions:
FW	–	(Namibia) Levis		Substituted on
MF	–	(Angola) Patrício		Substituted on
FW	–	(Angola) Riquinho		Substituted on
Manager:
(Netherlands) Jan Brouwer

GK	–	(Democratic Republic of the Congo) Dede		Substituted off
DF	–	(Angola) Buco
DF	–	(Angola) Hero
DF	–	(Angola) Lito
DF	–	(Angola) Mbala	Booked
MF	–	(Angola) Amaro
MF	–	(Angola) Nato Faial		Substituted off
MF	–	(Angola) Paíto
MF	–	(Angola) Totó	Booked
FW	–	(Angola) Avex
FW	–	(Angola) Vado
Substitutions:
GK	–	(Democratic Republic of the Congo) Ekobolo		Substituted on
MF	–	(Democratic Republic of the Congo) Masiala		Substituted on
Manager:
(Angola) Zeca Amaral

Assistant referees:
Pedro Mussungo
Inácio Cândido

2006 Angola Football Cup winner

Clube Desportivo Primeiro de Agosto
4th title

Squad: Abel, Bakala, Bebeto, Bena, Danny, Elísio, Gazeta, Joãozinho, Josemar, Kumaca, Levis, Locó, Mano, Mbinda, Milanzi, Moreno, Nelo, Neruda, Patrício, Pitchu, Riquinho, Roger, Rômulo, Tião, Vado, Zé Augusto
Head coach: Jan Brouwer

== See also ==
- 2006 Girabola
- 2007 Angola Super Cup
- 2007 CAF Confederation Cup
- Primeiro de Agosto players
- Benfica de Luanda players
