= 2001 Angola Cup =

Tournament details
- Country: Angola
- Dates: 16 May – 11 Nov 2001
- Teams: 17

Final positions
- Champions: Sonangol do Namibe
- Runners-up: Sporting de Cabinda
- 2002 African Cup Winners' Cup: Sonangol Namibe (cup winner)

Tournament statistics
- Matches played: 15

The 2001 Taça de Angola was the 20th edition of the Taça de Angola, the second most important and the top knock-out football club competition following the Girabola. Sonangol do Namibe beat Sporting de Cabinda 3-2 in the final to secure its 1st title.

The winner qualified to the 2002 African Cup Winners' Cup.

== Stadiums and locations ==
Locations of the 2001 Angola Cup teams

P	Team	Home city	Stadium	Capacity	2000	Current	P
4	Académica do Lobito	Lobito	Estádio do Buraco	10,000		QF	
4	ASA	Luanda	Estádio da Cidadela	60,000		QF	
5	Benfica de Luanda	Luanda	Campo de São Paulo	2,000		R16	Steady
6	Benfica do Lubango	Lubango				PR	
4	Desportivo do Bengo	Caxito	Municipal do Dande	5,000		QF	
5	FC de Cabinda	Cabinda	Estádio do Tafe	25,000		R16	
5	Ferroviário de Luanda	Luanda	Campo de S.Paulo	2,000		R16	
5	Inter de Luanda (Note: Later changed their name to Interclube)	Luanda	Estádio da Cidadela	65,000		R16	▼1
5	Onze Bravos (Note: Later changed their name to Bravos do Maquis)	Luena	Estádio Mundunduleno	4,300		R16	
4	Petro de Luanda	Luanda	Estádio da Cidadela	65,000		QF	
3	Petro do Huambo	Huambo	Estádio dos Kurikutelas	10,000		SF	Steady
5	Primeiro de Agosto	Luanda	Estádio da Cidadela	65,000		R16	
5	Primeiro de Maio	Benguela	Estádio Municipal	6,000		R16	Steady
3	Progresso	Luanda	Estádio da Cidadela	65,000		SF	Steady
5	Sagrada Esperança	Dundo	Estádio Sagrada Esperança	8,000		R16	
1	Sonangol do Namibe (Note: Later changed their name to Atlético do Namibe)	Namibe	Estádio Joaquim Morais	5,000		Champion	
2	Sporting de Cabinda	Cabinda	Estádio do Tafe	25,000		Runner-up	Steady

== Championship bracket ==
The knockout rounds were played according to the following schedule:

- May 16 - preliminary rounds
- Jul 18 - Sep 5: Round of 16
- Oct 10 - Sep 12: Quarter-finals
- Oct 31: Semi-finals
- Nov 11: Final

Preliminary Rounds; Wed, 16 May 2001
Wed, 16 May 2001 Walkover
Benfica Lubango	0
Petro Huambo	3

1/16 Finals; 17 July / 5 Sep 2001
Wed, 25 Jul 2001
11 Bravos	1
Progresso	2
Tue, 17 Jul 2001
Petro de Luanda	4
Benfica de Luanda	1
Wed, 18 Jul 2001
Académica Lobito	2
Sagrada Esperança	0
Wed, 5 Sep 2001 Walkover
Sonangol do Namibe	3
Primeiro de Maio	0
Wed, 18 Jul 2001 (pen) a.e.t.
Ferroviário de Luanda	3
Petro do Huambo	6
Wed, 18 Jul 2001
Desportivo do Bengo	2
Inter de Luanda	0
Thu, 19 Jul 2001
Primeiro de Agosto	0
Sporting Cabinda	2
Wed, 18 Jul 2001
ASA	5
FC Cabinda	3

Quarterfinals; 11 Oct / 12 Sep 2001
Thu, 11 Oct 2001 (pen) a.e.t.
Progresso	10
Petro de Luanda	7
Wed, 12 Sep 2001
Académica do Lobito	2
Sonangol do Namibe	4
Wed, 12 Sep 2001
Petro do Huambo	3
Desportivo do Bengo	1
Wed, 10 Oct 2001
Sporting Cabinda	7
ASA	6

Semifinals; Wed, 31 Oct 2001
Wed, 31 Oct 2001
Progresso Sambizanga	0
Sonangol do Namibe	1
Wed, 31 Oct 2001
Petro do Huambo	3
Sporting Cabinda	5

Final; Mon, 11 Nov 2001
Mon, 11 Nov 2001
Sonangol do Namibe	3
Sporting Cabinda	2

== Preliminary rounds ==
Wed, 16 May 2001 PR	Benfica do Lubango	Walkover	Petro do Huambo	Lubango
15:00

== 1/16 finals ==
Tue, 17 Jul 2001 R16	Petro de Luanda	4–1	Benfica de Luanda	Luanda
15:00	Flávio; Av.Lopes; Mbunga; Zico		Paulito	Stadium: Estádio da Cidadela

Wed, 18 Jul 2001 R16	ASA	1–1 (a.e.t.) (4–2 p)	FC Cabinda	Luanda
15:00	Mabululo		Adolfo	Stadium: Estádio da Cidadela

Wed, 18 Jul 2001 R16	Ferroviário de Luanda	1–1 (a.e.t.) (2–5 p)	Petro do Huambo	Luanda
15:00				Stadium: Campo de S.Paulo

Wed, 18 Jul 2001 R16	Desportivo do Bengo	2–0	Inter de Luanda	Caxito
15:00				Stadium: Campo Municipal do Dande

Wed, 18 Jul 2001 R16	Académica Lobito	2–0	Sagrada Esperança	Catumbela
15:00				Stadium: Campo da Catumbela

Thu, 19 Jul 2001 R16	1º de Agosto	0–2	Sp de Cabinda	Luanda
15:00				Stadium: Estádio da Cidadela

Wed, 25 Jul 2001 R16	11 Bravos	–	Progresso	Luena
15:00				Stadium: Estádio Mundunduleno

Wed, 5 Sep 2001 R16	Sonangol Namibe	Walkover	Primeiro de Maio	Namibe
15:00				Stadium: Estádio Joaquim Morais

== Quarter-finals ==
Wed, 12 Sep 2001 QF	Petro do Huambo	3–1	Desportivo do Bengo	Huambo
15:00

Wed, 12 Sep 2001 QF	Académica Lobito	0–0 (a.e.t.) (2–4 p)	Sonangol Namibe	Lobito
15:00

Wed, 10 Oct 2001 QF	Sp de Cabinda	0–0 (a.e.t.) (7–6 p)	ASA	Cabinda
15:00				Stadium: Estádio do Tafe

Thu, 11 Oct 2001 QF	Progresso Sambizanga	3–3 (a.e.t.) (7–4 p)	Petro de Luanda	Luanda
15:00				Stadium: Estádio da Cidadela

== Semi-finals ==
Wed, 31 Oct 2001 SF	Progresso Sambizanga	0–1	Sonangol Namibe	Luanda
15:00				Stadium: Estádio da Cidadela

Wed, 31 Oct 2001 SF	Petro Huambo	1–1 (a.e.t.) (2–4 p)	Sporting Cabinda	Huambo
15:00				Stadium: Estádio dos Kurikutelas

== Final ==
Sun, 11 November 2001
15:00

Sonangol do Namibe	3–2	Sporting de Cabinda
Lukikana 3'; Hugo 16'; Tony 34'		36' (pen.) Tyson; 62' Lucien

Estádio da Cidadela, Luanda
Referee: José António de Sousa

Sonangol	Sporting

GK	–	(Angola)
DF	–	(Angola)
DF	–	(Angola)
DF	–	(Angola)
DF	–	(Angola)
MF	–	(Angola)	Substituted off
MF	–	(Angola)
MF	–	(Angola)
MF	–	(Angola)
FW	–	(Angola)	Substituted off
FW	–	(Angola) (c)	Substituted off
Substitutions:
MF	–	(Democratic Republic of the Congo)	Substituted on
MF	–	(Angola)	Substituted on
DF	–	(Angola)	Substituted on
Manager:
(Angola) Zeca Amaral

GK	–	(Angola)
DF	–	(Angola)
DF	–	(Angola)
DF	–	(Angola)
DF	–	(Angola)
MF	–	(Angola)
MF	–	(Angola)
MF	–	(Angola)
MF	–	(Angola)
FW	–	(Angola)
FW	–	(Angola)
Substitutions:
MF	–	(Angola)	Substituted on
MF	–	(Angola)	Substituted on
MF	–	(Angola)	Substituted on
Manager:
(Democratic Republic of the Congo) JC Kenzo

Assistant referees:

2001 Angola Football Cup winner

Desportivo Sonangol do Namibe
1st title

Squad:
Head coach: Zeca Amaral

== See also ==
- 2001 Girabola
- 2002 Angola Super Cup
- 2002 African Cup Winners' Cup
- Sonangol do Namibe players
- Sporting de Cabinda players
