= 2000 Angola Cup =

Tournament details
- Country: Angola
- Dates: 24 Feb - 11 Nov 2000
- Teams: 16

Final positions
- Champions: Petro Luanda
- Runners-up: Inter de Luanda
- 2001 African Cup Winners' Cup: Inter de Luanda (cup runner-up)

Tournament statistics
- Matches played: 15

The 2000 Taça de Angola was the 19th edition of the Taça de Angola, the second most important and the top knock-out football club competition following the Girabola. Petro de Luanda beat Inter de Luanda 1-0 in the final to secure its 7th title.

Inter de Luanda, the runner-up, qualified to the African Cup Winners' Cup since Petro de Luanda, the winner, contested the CAF Champions League in their capacity as the Girabola winner.

== Stadiums and locations ==
Locations of the 2001 Angola Cup teams

P	Team	Home city	Stadium	Capacity	1999	Current	P
5	Académica do Lobito	Lobito	Estádio do Buraco	10,000		R16	
3	Académica do Soyo	Soyo				SF	
6	ARA da Gabela	Sumbe				PR	
4	ASA	Luanda	Estádio da Cidadela	60,000		QF	
5	Benfica de Luanda	Luanda	Campo de São Paulo	2,000		R16	Steady
6	Cambondo	Malanje	Estádio 1º de Maio			PR	
6	FC da Corimba	Luanda	Campo de S.Paulo	2,000		PR	
4	FC de Cabinda	Cabinda	Estádio do Tafe	25,000		QF	
2	Inter de Luanda (Note: Later changed their name to Interclube)	Luanda	Estádio da Cidadela	65,000		Runner-up	▼1
1	Petro de Luanda	Luanda	Estádio da Cidadela	65,000		Champion	
5	Primeiro de Agosto	Luanda	Estádio da Cidadela	65,000		R16	
5	Progresso	Luanda	Estádio da Cidadela	65,000		R16	Steady
4	Sagrada Esperança	Dundo	Estádio Sagrada Esperança	8,000		QF	
4	Sonangol do Namibe (Note: Later changed their name to Atlético do Namibe)	Namibe	Estádio Joaquim Morais	5,000		QF	
5	Sporting de Cabinda	Cabinda	Estádio do Tafe	25,000		R16	Steady
3	Sporting do bié	Kuito				SF	

== Championship bracket ==
The knockout rounds were played according to the following schedule:

- Mar 15 - Feb 24: preliminary rounds
- Jun 20 - 28: Round of 16
- Aug 2 - 3: Quarter-finals
- Sep 6: Semi-finals
- Nov 11: Final

Preliminary Rounds; 15 Mar - 24 Feb 2000
Wed, 15 Mar 2000
Petro de Luanda	4
Cambondo	0
Thu, 16 Mar 2000
Benfica Luanda	2
ARA da Gabela	0
Thu, 24 Feb 2000
Progresso
FC da Corimba

1/16 Finals; 20–28 Jun 2000
Wed, 21 Jun 2000
Petro de Luanda	3
Académica Lobito	2
Wed, 28 Jun 2000
Benfica de Luanda	0
Sonangol Namibe	1
Tue, 20 Jun 2000
ASA	2
Progresso	0
Sagrada Esperança
Sporting Cabinda
Sat, 4 Mar 2000
Primeiro de Agosto	1
Inter de Luanda	2

Quarterfinals; 2 / 3 Aug 2000
Wed, 2 Aug 2000
Petro de Luanda	1
FC de Cabinda	0
Wed, 2 Aug 2000
Sonangol do Namibe	1
Académica do Soyo	2
Thu, 3 Aug 2000 (pen) a.e.t.
Sporting Bié	6
ASA	4
Thu, 3 Aug 2000
Sagrada Esperança	0
Inter de Luanda	1

Semifinals; Wed, 6 Sep 2000
Wed, 6 Sep 2000
Petro de Luanda	4
Académica Soyo	0
Wed, 6 Sep 2000
Sporting do Bié	0
Inter de Luanda	1

Final; Sat, 11 Nov 2000
Sat, 11 Nov 2000
Petro de Luanda	1
Inter de Luanda	0

== Preliminary rounds ==
Thu, 24 Feb 2000 PR	Progresso	–	FC Corimba	Luanda
15:00

== Round 1 ==
R16	Sagrada Esperança	–	Sporting Cabinda	Dundo
15:00				Stadium: Quintalão do Dundo

Sat, 4 Mar 2000 R16	1º de Agosto	1–2	Inter Luanda	Luanda
15:00	Moisés 10'		81' Papy; 90' (pen.) Ab.Amaral	Stadium: Estádio da Cidadela

Wed, 15 Mar 2000 R16	Petro Luanda	4–0	Cambondo	Luanda
15:00	William 24' 53'; Betinho 34'; Guedes 49'			Stadium: Estádio da Cidadela

Thu, 16 Mar 2000 R16	Benfica de Luanda	2–0	ARA da Gabela	Luanda
15:00	Rabolé 47'; Marcelo 62' (pen.)			Stadium: Campo de S.Paulo

== 1/16 finals ==
Tue, 20 Jun 2000 R16	ASA	2–0	Progresso	Luanda
15:00

Wed, 21 Jun 2000 R16	Petro de Luanda	3–2	Académica Lobito	Luanda
15:00				Stadium: Estádio da Cidadela

Wed, 28 Jun 2000 R16	Benfica de Luanda	0–1	Sonangol do Namibe	Luanda
15:00			26' Minhas	Stadium: Estádio da Cidadela

== Quarter-finals ==
Wed, 2 Aug 2000 QF	Petro de Luanda	1–0	FC de Cabinda	Luanda
15:00	Zico (pen.)			Stadium: Estádio da Cidadela

Wed, 2 Aug 2000 QF	Sonangol do Namibe	1–2	Académica do Soyo	Namibe
15:00				Stadium: Estádio Joaquim Morais

Thu, 3 Aug 2000 QF	Sporting Bié	1–1 (a.e.t.) (5–3 p)	ASA	Kuito
15:00	Dady		Joni

Thu, 3 Aug 2000 QF	Sagrada Esperança	0–1	Inter de Luanda	Dundo
15:00			Pathy	Stadium: Quintalão do Dundo

== Semi-finals ==
Wed, 6 Sep 2000 SF	Petro de Luanda	4–0	Académica do Soyo	Luanda
15:00	Av.Lopes 16' 80'; Gui 59'; Flávio 64'			Stadium: Estádio da Cidadela

Wed, 6 Sep 2000 SF	Sporting do Bié	0–1	Inter de Luanda	Kuito
15:00			Ab.Amaral

== Final ==
Sat, 11 November 2000
15:00

Petro de Luanda	1–0	Inter de Luanda
Flávio 79'

Estádio da Cidadela, Luanda
Referee: Luís Manuel João

Petro	Inter

GK	–	(Angola) Nando
RB	–	(Angola) Renato
CB	–	(Angola) Dias Caires
CB	–	(Angola) Didí
LB	–	(Angola) Nsuka
MF	–	(Angola) Gui
MF	–	(Democratic Republic of the Congo) Mbiyavanga	Substituted off
MF	–	(Angola) Jonas
MF	–	(Angola) Zico	Substituted off
FW	–	(Angola) Avelino Lopes
FW	–	(Angola) Flávio
Substitutions:
MF	–	(Angola) Caricoco	Substituted on
MF	–	(Angola) Gilberto	Substituted on
Manager:
(Brazil) Djalma Cavalcante

GK	–	(Democratic Republic of the Congo) Papy
DF	–	(Angola) Baptista
DF	–	(Angola) Kikas
DF	–	(Angola) Não Tiri
DF	–	(Angola) Zequinhas
MF	–	(Angola) Buta	Substituted off
MF	–	(Angola) Dadi	Substituted off
MF	–	(Angola) Miloy
MF	–	(Democratic Republic of the Congo) Pathy
FW	–	(Angola) Mimoso
FW	–	(Angola) Paulito	Substituted off
Substitutions:
MF	–	(Angola) Abílio Amaral	Substituted on
FW	–	(Angola) André	Substituted on
MF	–	(Angola) Igor	Substituted on
Manager:
(Angola) Oliveira Gonçalves

Assistant referees:

2000 Angola Football Cup winner

Atlético Petróleos de Luanda
7th title

Squad: Avelino Lopes, Betinho, Cacharamba, Caricoco, Chinho, Dias Caires, Didí, Filipe, Flávio, Gilberto, Guedes, Gui, Jonas, Mbiyavanga, Nando, Nsuka, Renato, William, Zico
Head coach: Djalma Cavalcante

== See also ==
- 2000 Girabola
- 2001 Angola Super Cup
- 2001 African Cup Winners' Cup
- Sonangol do Namibe players
- Inter de Luanda players
