= 2009 Angola Cup =

Tournament details
- Country: Angola
- Dates: 13 Jun – 11 Nov 2009
- Teams: 23

Final positions
- Champions: 1º de Agosto
- Runners-up: Sagrada Esperança
- CAF Confederation Cup: 1º de Agosto (winner); Ac Soyo (semi-finalist)

Tournament statistics
- Matches played: 22

The 2009 Taça de Angola was the 28th edition of the Taça de Angola, the second most important and the top knock-out football club competition in Angola, following the Girabola. Primeiro de Agosto beat Sagrada Esperança 2–1 in the final, to secure its 3rd title.

The winner and the runner-up qualified to the CAF Confederation Cup. Sagrada who were supposed to participate as the runner-up, later declined to participate citing financial reasons, being replaced by Académica do Soyo.

== Stadia and locations ==
Location of the 2009 Angola Cup teams

P	Team	Home city	Stadium	Capacity	2008	Current	P
5	Académica do Lobito	Lobito	Estádio do Buraco	3,000	R16	R16	Steady
3	Académica do Soyo	Soyo	Estádio dos Imbondeiros	10,000	DNP	SF	n/a
5	ASA	Luanda	Estádio da Cidadela	60,000	R16	R16	Steady
5	Atlético do Namibe	Namibe	Estádio Joaquim Morais	5,000	DNP	R16	n/a
6	Baixa de Cassanje	Malanje	Estádio 1º de Maio	3,500	PR	PR	Steady
5	Benfica de Luanda	Luanda	Estádio dos Coqueiros	8,000	R16	R16	Steady
6	Benfica do Lubango	Lubango	Estádio da N.Sra do Monte	14,000	R16	PR	▼1
5	Bravos do Maquis	Luena	Estádio Mundunduleno	4,300	R16	R16	Steady
6	Casa Helu	Dundo	Estádio Sagrada Esperança	8,000	DNP	PR	n/a
3	Desportivo da Huíla	Lubango	Estádio do Ferrovia	15,000	QF	SF	▲1
4	Interclube	Luanda	Estádio 22 de Junho	7,000	QF	QF	Steady
5	Kabuscorp	Luanda	Estádio dos Coqueiros	8,000	QF	R16	▼1
4	Petro de Luanda	Luanda	Estádio da Cidadela	50,000	R16	QF	▲1
6	Petro do Huambo	Huambo	Estádio dos Kuricutelas	17,000	R16	PR	▼1
1	Primeiro de Agosto	Luanda	Estádio da Cidadela	50,000	QF	Champion	▲3
5	Primeiro de Maio	Benguela	Estádio Edelfride Costa	6,000	SF	R16	▼2
6	Progresso	Luanda	Estádio dos Coqueiros	8,000	R16	PR	▼1
6	Real M'buco	Cabinda	Estádio do Tafe	25,000	DNP	PR	n/a
4	Rec da Caála	Huambo	Estádio do Ferrovia		DNP	QF	n/a
6	Rec do Kafanda	Caxito	Campo da Açucareira	10,000	DNP	PR	n/a
5	Recreativo do Libolo	Calulo	Estádio Municipal de Calulo	10,000	Runner-Up	R16	▼3
2	Sagrada Esperança	Dundo	Estádio Sagrada Esperança	8,000	SF	Runner-Up	▲1
4	Santos FC	Luanda	Estádio dos Coqueiros	8,000	Champion	QF	▼4

== Championship bracket ==
Preliminary Rounds; 14 Jun 2009
1º de Agosto (bye)
1º de Maio (bye)
Petro Luanda (bye)
Sat, 13 Jun 2009
Bravos Maquis	6
Rec do Kafanda	0
Sun, 14 Jun 2009
Casa Helu	1
Desportivo Huíla	3
Sun, 14 Jun 2009
Real M'buco
Atlético Namibe
Académica Lobito (bye)
Rec da Caála (bye)
Sun, 14 Jun 2009
Progresso	2
Kabuscorp	3
Sun, 14 Jun 2009
Benfica Lubango
Interclube
Sun, 14 Jun 2009
Petro Huambo
Sagrada
Benfica Luanda (bye)
Sun, 14 Jun 2009
Baixa Cassanje
Académica Soyo
Rec do Libolo (bye)
ASA (bye)
Santos FC (bye)

1/16 Finals; 25/26 Jul 2009
Sat, 25 Jul 2009
1º de Agosto	2
1º de Maio	1
Sun, 26 Jul 2009
Petro Luanda	3
Bravos Maquis	0
Tue, 28 Jul 2009
Atlético Namibe	0
Desportivo Huíla	1
Sun, 26 Jul 2009 (pen)
Académica Lobito	4
Rec da Caála	6
Sun, 26 Jul 2009
Kabuscorp	1
Interclube	3
Tue, 28 Jul 2009 (pen)
Sagrada	6
Benfica Luanda	5
Sat, 25 Jul 2009 (pen)
Académica Soyo	5
Rec do Libolo	2
Mon, 27 Jul 2009
ASA	1
Santos FC	3

Quarterfinals; 19 Aug 2009
Wed, 19 Aug 2009 (pen)
Petro Luanda	3
1º de Agosto	5
Sun, 16 Aug 2009
Desportivo Huíla	2
Rec da Caála	1
Wed, 19 Aug 2009
Interclube	3
Sagrada	5
Thu, 20 Aug 2009
Académica Soyo	2
Santos FC	1

Semifinals; 30 Sep 2009
Wed, 30 Sep 2009 (pen)
Desportivo Huíla	3
1º de Agosto	4
Wed, 30 Sep 2009 (pen)
Sagrada Esperança	11
Académica Soyo	10

Final; 11 Nov 2009
Fri, 11 Nov 2009
1º de Agosto	2
Sagrada Esperança	1

== Provincial stage ==
Sun, 17 May 2009 PS	Petro do Huambo	2–2 (9–8 p)	Benfica do Huambo	Huambo
15:00 WAT (UTC+1)	Vado 2'; Cigarro 4'	Report	29' Deco; 34' Etumba	Stadium: Kurikutelas; Referee: José Chiquito; Francisco Lucas, Aleixo Rodrigues

== Preliminary rounds ==
Sat, 13 Jun 2009 PR	Bravos Maquis	6–0	Rec da Kafanda	Luanda
15:00 WAT (UTC+1)				Stadium: Cidadela

Sun, 14 Jun 2009 PR	Casa Helu	1–3	Desportivo Huíla	Dundo
15:00 WAT (UTC+1)	Guedes 45+'		28' Agostinho; 65' Carol; Sidnei	Stadium: Sagrada Esperança

Sun, 14 Jun 2009 PR	Real M'buco	–	Atlético Namibe	Cabinda
15:00 WAT (UTC+1)

Sun, 14 Jun 2009 PR	Progresso	2–3	Kabuscorp	Luanda
15:00 WAT (UTC+1)	Dione 28' (pen.); Dedé 44'	Report	38' Riquinho; 85' Zinho; 89' Agugú	Stadium: Cidadela; Referee: Hélder Martins; Denilson Gourgel, Victor Paulino

Sun, 14 Jun 2009 PR	Benfica Lubango	–	Interclube	Lubango
15:00 WAT (UTC+1)

Sun, 14 Jun 2009 PR	Petro Huambo	–	Sagrada Esperança	Huambo
15:00 WAT (UTC+1)

Sun, 14 Jun 2009 PR	Baixa Cassanje	–	Académica Soyo	Huambo
15:00 WAT (UTC+1)

== Round of 16 ==
Sat, 25 Jul 2009 R16	1º de Agosto	2–1	1º de Maio	Luanda
15:00 WAT (UTC+1)	Danny 80' 90+'		(yellow card) (yellow-red card) 59' Coimbra; 84' William	Stadium: Cidadela

Sun, 26 Jul 2009 R16	Petro Luanda	3–0	Bravos Maquis	Luanda
15:00 WAT (UTC+1)	Joka; Etah; Massinga			Stadium: Cidadela

Tue, 28 Jul 2009 R16	Atlético Namibe	0–1	Desportivo Huíla	Namibe
15:00 WAT (UTC+1)			30' Norla	Stadium: Joaquim Morais; Referee: Marximina Bernardo

Sun, 26 Jul 2009 R16	Académica Lobito	2–2 (a.e.t.) (2–4 p)	Rec da Caála	Cabinda
15:00 WAT (UTC+1)

Sun, 26 Jul 2009 R16	Kabuscorp	1–3	Interclube	Luanda
15:00 WAT (UTC+1)	Mbiyavanga		P. Henriques; Nuno; Minguito	Stadium: Coqueiros

Tue, 28 Jul 2009 R16	Sagrada Esperança	1–1 (a.e.t.) (5–4 p)	Benfica Luanda	Dundo
16:00 WAT (UTC+1)	Fita (red card); Beto 84'		54' Avex	Stadium: Sagrada Esperança; Referee: Romualdo Baltazar, Jerson Emiliano, Eduardo Samuel

Sat, 25 Jul 2009 R16	Académica Soyo	1–1 (a.e.t.) (4–1 p)	Rec do Libolo	Soyo
15:00 WAT (UTC+1)

Mon, 27 Jul 2009 R16	ASA	1–3	Santos FC	Luanda
15:30 WAT (UTC+1)	T.Osódio 45+' (pen.)		74' (o.g.) Jamba; 82' 89' Rainho	Stadium: Cidadela

== Quarter-finals ==
Wed, 19 Aug 2009 QF	Petro Luanda	2–2 (a.e.t.) (1–3 p)	1º de Agosto	Luanda
15:00 WAT (UTC+1)	David 23' (pen.); Job 61'; Locó (yellow card); Nelo (yellow card)	Report	28' Bena; 43' (pen.) Love; (yellow card) M.Sanda; (yellow card) James; (yellow card) Danny	Stadium: Cidadela; Attendance: 3.500; Referee: Hélder Martins; Denilson Gourgel, Júlio Lemos
	Penalties
	Locó (penalty scored)		(penalty scored) Kumaca; (penalty scored) Manucho; (penalty scored) Danny

Sun, 16 Aug 2009 QF	Desportivo Huíla	2–1	Rec da Caála
15:00 WAT (UTC+1)

Wed, 19 Aug 2009 QF	Interclube	3–5	Sagrada	Luanda
15:00 WAT (UTC+1)

Thu, 20 Aug 2009 QF	Académica Soyo	2–1	Santos FC	Soyo
15:00 WAT (UTC+1)	Mano 30'; Francisco 73'; Debele (yellow card); Dady (yellow card); Tshukuma (yellow card)	Report	14' (pen.) (yellow card) Chinho; (yellow card) (yellow-red card) 52' Milex	Stadium: Estádio dos Embondeiros; Referee: Venâncio Daniel

== Semi-finals ==
Wed, 30 Sep 2009 SF	Desportivo Huíla	1–1 (a.e.t.) (3–4 p)	1º de Agosto	Namibe
15:30 WAT (UTC+1)	Esquadra 84'		77' Tuabi	Stadium: Joaquim Morais

Wed, 30 Sep 2009 SF	Sagrada Esperança	1–1 (a.e.t.) (10–9 p)	Académica Soyo	Dundo
15:00 WAT (UTC+1)	Sotto 51'		73' Tshukuma	Stadium: Sagrada Esperança; Attendance: 8.000; Referee: Romualdo Baltazar; Jerson Emiliano, Eduardo Samuel

== Final ==
11 November 2009
16:00

1º de Agosto	2–1	Sagrada Esperança
Fofaná 15'; Love 67'	Report	87' Fatite

Estádio da Cidadela, Luanda
Attendance: 10.000
Referee: Fernando Mação

D'Agosto	Sagrada

GK	22	(Angola) Tony
RB	18	(Angola) Elísio (c)
CB	4	(Angola) Kumaca
CB	6	(Angola) Mingo Sanda
LB	26	(Angola) Joãozinho
RM	17	(Angola) Bena
CM	15	(Angola) Roger
CM	13	(Angola) Manucho	(yellow card) 52'
LM	29	(Angola) Fofaná		(substituted off) 75'
CF	7	(Angola) Love
CF	14	(Zambia) Danny		(substituted off) 60'
Substitutions:
MF	8	(Angola) Zé Augusto		(substituted on) 60'
MF	5	(Namibia) Dockies		(substituted on) 75'
Manager:
(Angola) Humberto Chaves

GK	–	(Democratic Republic of the Congo) Zamba
RB	–	(Angola) Carlos	Booked
CB	–	(Angola) Dias Caires		(substituted off) 77'
CB	–	(Angola) Vilar
LB	–	(Angola) Palucho
RM	–	(Angola) Loló		(substituted off) 61'
CM	–	(Angola) Fatite
CM	–	(Angola) Paíto		(substituted off) 45'
LM	–	(Democratic Republic of the Congo) Nsingui
CF	–	(Angola) Beto
CF	–	(Ivory Coast) Savané
Substitutions:
MF	–	(Angola) Sotto		(substituted on) 45'
–	–	(Angola) Nelito		(substituted on) 61'
MF	–	(Namibia) Djo		(substituted on) 77'
Manager:
(Angola) Napoleão Brandão

Assistant referees:
Domingos Adão
Wilson Ntyamba

2009 Angola Football Cup winner

5th title

Squad:
Pitchú, Rúbian, Tony Cabaça (GK)
Chinês, Elísio, Esquadra, James Sangala, Joãozinho, Kumaca, Mingo Sanda, Pataca, (DF)
Alberto, Dockies, Fofaná, Gomes, Mano, Manucho, Mingo Bile, Ramaphoko, Roger, Zé Augusto (MF)
Bena, Danny Hangunyu, Efemberg, Love, Pilola, Tuabi (FW)
Jorge Humberto Chaves (Head Coach)

== See also ==
- 2009 Girabola
- 2010 Angola Super Cup
- 2010 CAF Confederation Cup
- Primeiro de Agosto players
- Sagrada Esperança players
