= 2002 Angola Cup =

Tournament details
- Country: Angola
- Dates: 8 Jun – 11 Nov 2002
- Teams: 17

Final positions
- Champions: Petro de Luanda
- Runners-up: Desp da Huíla
- 2003 African Cup Winners' Cup: Petro de Luanda (cup winner)

Tournament statistics
- Matches played: 15

The 2002 Taça de Angola was the 21st edition of the Taça de Angola, the second most important and the top knock-out football club competition following the Girabola. Petro de Luanda beat Desportivo da Huíla 3–0 in the final to secure its 8th title.

The winner qualified to the 2003 African Cup Winners' Cup.

== Stadiums and locations ==
Locations of the 2002 Angola Cup teams

P	Team	Home city	Stadium	Capacity	2001	Current	P
5	Académica do Lobito	Lobito	Estádio do Buraco	10,000	QF	R16	▼1
5	ASA	Luanda	Estádio da Cidadela	60,000	QF	R16	▼1
5	Benfica de Luanda	Luanda	Campo de São Paulo	2,000	R16	R16	Steady
6	Benfica do Lubango	Lubango			PR	PR	Steady
5	Bravos do Maquis	Luena	Estádio Mundunduleno	4,300	R16	R16	Steady
2	Desportivo Huíla	Lubango	Estádio do Ferrovia	15,000	DNP	Runner-up	n/a
5	FC de Cabinda	Cabinda	Estádio do Tafe	25,000	R16	R16	Steady
5	Inter de Luanda (Note: Later changed their name to Interclube)	Luanda	Estádio da Cidadela	65,000	R16	R16	Steady
1	Petro de Luanda	Luanda	Estádio da Cidadela	65,000	QF	Champion	▲4
4	Petro do Huambo	Huambo	Estádio dos Kurikutelas	10,000	SF	QF	▼1
3	Primeiro de Agosto	Luanda	Estádio da Cidadela	65,000	R16	SF	▲2
5	Primeiro de Maio	Benguela	Estádio Municipal	6,000	R16	R16	Steady
4	Progresso	Luanda	Estádio da Cidadela	65,000	SF	QF	▼1
3	Sagrada Esperança	Dundo	Estádio Sagrada Esperança	8,000	R16	SF	▲2
5	Sonangol do Namibe (Note: Later changed their name to Atlético do Namibe)	Namibe	Estádio Joaquim Morais	5,000	Champion	R16	▼4
4	Sporting de Cabinda	Cabinda	Estádio do Tafe	25,000	Runner-up	QF	▼2
4	Sporting do Bié	Kuito	Estádio dos Eucaliptos	16,000	DNP	QF	n/a

== Championship bracket ==
The knockout rounds were played according to the following schedule:

- June 8 - preliminary rounds
- Jul 20 - 24: Round of 16
- Sep 8 - 12: Quarter-finals
- Nov 2–3: Semi-finals
- Nov 11: Final

Preliminary Rounds; Sun, 8 Jun 2002
Sun, 8 Jun 2003 Walkover
1º de Agosto	3
Benfica Lubango	0

1/16 Finals; 20 / 24 Jul 2002
Sat, 20 Jul 2002
Petro de Luanda	3
ASA	1
Sun, 21 Jul 2002 (pen) a.e.t.
FC de Cabinda	4
Sporting Cabinda	5
Wed, 24 Jul 2002
Benfica de Luanda	0
Sagrada Esperança	2
Sat, 20 Jul 2002
Bravos Maquis	0
Progresso	2
Sat, 20 Jul 2002 (pen) a.e.t.
Académica Lobito	1
Desp da Huíla	4
Tue, 23 Jul 2002 (pen) a.e.t.
Inter de Luanda	1
Sporting do Bié	3
Sun, 21 Jul 2002
Sonangol do Namibe	1
Primeiro de Agosto	2
Sun, 21 Jul 2002
Primeiro de Maio	1
Petro do Huambo	2

Quarterfinals; 8 / 12 Sep 2002
Thu, 12 Sep 2002 (pen) a.e.t.
Petro de Luanda	5
Sporting Cabinda	3
Sun, 8 Sep 2002
Sagrada Esperança	1
Progresso Sambizanga	0
Wed, 11 Sep 2002
Desportivo Huíla	2
Sporting do Bié	1
Wed, 11 Sep 2002
Primeiro de Agosto	4
Petro do Huambo	1

Semifinals; 2–3 Nov 2002
Sat, 2 Nov 2002 (pen) a.e.t.
Petro de Luanda	5
Sagrada Esperança	4
Sun, 3 Nov 2002
Desportivo Huíla	2
Primeiro de Agosto	1

Final; Mon, 11 Nov 2002
mON, 11 Nov 2002
Petro de Luanda	3
Desportivo da Huíla	0

== Preliminary rounds ==
Sat, 11 May 2002 PR	1º de Agosto	Walkover	Benfica Lubango	Luanda
15:00				Stadium: Estádio da Cidadela

== 1/16 finals ==
Sat, 20 Jul 2002 R16	Aca Lobito	1–1 (a.e.t.) (0–3 p)	Desp da Huíla	Lobito
18:30				Referee: Muluta Prata

Sat, 20 Jul 2002 R16	Bravos Maquis	0–2	Progresso	Luena
15:00			58' (pen.) Zacarias; 78' Tinto	Stadium: Estádio Mundunduleno; Referee: Eduardo Kadicana

Sat, 20 Jul 2002 R16	Petro Luanda	3–1	ASA	Luanda
15:00	Chinho 46'; Flávio 72'; Zico 79'		80' Kadima	Stadium: Estádio da Cidadela; Referee: Roberto Talaia Jr; Victor Paulino, Midreth Sousa

Sun, 21 Jul 2002 R16	Sonangol Namibe	1–2	1º de Agosto	Namibe
15:00				Stadium: Estádio Joaquim Morais; Referee: Fernando Mação

Sun, 21 Jul 2002 R16	FC Cabinda	1–1 (a.e.t.) (3–4 p)	Sp de Cabinda	Cabinda
15:00				Stadium: Estádio do Tafe; Referee: Luís Manuel João

Sun, 21 Jul 2002 R16	Primeiro de Maio	1–2	Petro do Huambo	Benguela
15:00				Stadium: Estádio Municipal; Referee: José de Sousa

Tue, 23 Jul 2002 R16	Inter Luanda	0–0 (a.e.t.) (1–3 p)	Sp do Bié	Luanda
15:00				Stadium: Estádio da Cidadela; Referee: Bebiano Melo

Wed, 24 Jul 2002 R16	Benfica Luanda	0–2	Sagrada Esperança	Luanda
15:00				Stadium: Campo de S.Paulo; Referee: Ernesto Tati

== Quarter-finals ==
Sun, 8 Sep 2002 QF	Sagrada	1–0	Progresso	Sumbe
15:00				Attendance: 500

Wed, 11 Sep 2002 QF	Primeiro de Agosto	4–1	Petro do Huambo	Lubango
15:00	Sotto 46'; Loló 67' 80'; Ngueno (o.g.)		86' Gazeta	Stadium: Estádio do Ferrovia

Wed, 11 Sep 2002 QF	Desp da Huíla	2–1	Sp do Bié	Luanda
15:00				Stadium: Estádio da Cidadela

Thu, 12 Sep 2002 QF	Petro de Luanda	2–2 (a.e.t.) (3–1 p)	Sp de Cabinda	Luanda
15:00	Jonas 67'; Zico 78'		57' Lucien; 87' Eugénio	Stadium: Estádio da Cidadela
	Penalties
	Delgado (penalty scored); N.Faial (penalty scored); D.Caires (penalty scored)		(penalty scored) Alain

== Semi-finals ==
Sat, 2 Nov 2002 SF	Petro de Luanda	0–0 (a.e.t.) (5–4 p)	Sagrada Esperança	Luanda
15:30				Stadium: Estádio da Cidadela

Sun, 3 Nov 2002 SF	Desp da Huíla	2–1	1º de Agosto	Lubango
15:00	Múcua 1'; Pepé 57'		20' Lucas

== Final ==
Mon, 11 November 2002
15:00

Petro de Luanda	3–0	Desportivo da Huíla
Renato 38'; Mbunga 67', 88'

Estádio da Cidadela, Luanda
Attendance: 30,000
Referee: Carlos Lopes

Petro	Desportivo

GK	22	(Angola) Lamá
RB	13	(Angola) Renato
CB	4	(Angola) Dias Caires
CB	29	(Angola) Mandiango
LB	3	(Angola) Delgado
RM	5	(Angola) Dione	(yellow card) 27'	(substituted off) 87'
CM	27	(Angola) Andia
CM	28	(Angola) Chara
LM	9	(Angola) Jonas (c)	(yellow card) 40'
FW	7	(Angola) Betinho		(substituted off) 71'
FW	19	(Angola) Chinho		(substituted off) 65'
Substitutions:
MF	23	(Democratic Republic of the Congo) Mbunga		(substituted on) 65'
MF	10	(Angola) Zico		(substituted on) 71'
MF	20	(Angola) Caricoco		(substituted on) 87'
Manager:
(Brazil) José Roberto Ávilas

GK	12	(Angola) Virgílio
DF	5	(Angola) Luís
DF	25	(Angola) Melco
DF	26	(Angola) Paulo Augusto
DF	28	(Angola) Nejó
MF	8	(Angola) Betinho
MF	13	(Angola) Múcua (c)	(yellow card) 10'
MF	17	(Angola) Ito	(yellow card) 50'
MF	24	(Angola) Pepé		(substituted off) 77'
FW	7	(Angola) Piquina
FW	14	(Angola) Paulo II		(substituted off) 46'
Substitutions:
MF	23	(Angola) Frederico		(substituted on) 46'
MF	20	(Angola) Brandão	(yellow card) 79'	(substituted on) 77'
Manager:
(Angola) Augusto Kamati

Assistant referees:

2002 Angola Football Cup winner

Atlético Petróleos de Luanda
8th title

Squad: Adolfo, Andia, Betinho, Chara, Chinho, Delgado, Dias Caires, Didí, Flávio, Jonas, Lamá, Mandiangu, Maninho, Marito, Mbunga, Nato Faial, Pitchu, Renato, Santana, Zico
Head coach: José Roberto Ávilas

== See also ==
- 2002 Girabola
- 2003 Angola Super Cup
- 2003 African Cup Winners' Cup
- Petro de Luanda players
- Desportivo da Huíla players
