= 2001 Girabola =

Girabola 2001
- Season: 2001 (Mar 17–Dec 16)
- Champions: Petro de Luanda
- Relegated: Bravos do Maquis; Primeiro de Maio; Progresso do Sambizanga
- 2002 CAF Champions League: Petro de Luanda (Girabola winner)
- 2002 CAF Cup: ASA (Girabola runner-up)
- Matches: 182
- Goals: 410 (2.25 per match)
- Top goalscorer: Flávio Amado (23 goals)
- Biggest home win: Pet Lua 7–0 Pri Mai (1 Aug 2001); Pet Lua 7–0 Pet Hua (4 Aug 2001)
- Biggest away win: 3 matches: FC Cab 0–3 ASA (19 May 2001); Pet Hua 0–3 ASA (7 Oct 2001); Sonang 0–3 Pet Lua (14 Oct 2001)
- Highest scoring: Pet Lua 6–4 Br. Maq (19 May 2001)

The 2001 Girabola was the 23rd season of top-tier football competition in Angola. The season ran from 17 March to 16 December 2001. Petro de Luanda were the defending champions.

The league comprised 14 teams, the bottom three of which were relegated to the 2002 Gira Angola.

Petro de Luanda were crowned champions, winning their 13th title, while Bravos do Maquis, Primeiro de Maio and Progresso do Sambizanga, were relegated.

Flávio Amado of Petro de Luanda finished as the top scorer with 23 goals.

== Changes from the 2000 season ==
Relegated: ARA da Gabela, Sporting Cabinda and Sporting do Bié
Promoted: Benfica do Lubango, Primeiro de Maio and Progresso do Sambizanga

Locations of the 2001 Girabola teams

== League table ==
Pos	Team	Pld	W	D	L	GF	GA	GD	Pts	Qualification or relegation
1	Petro de Luanda (C)	26	17	6	3	60	20	+40	57	Qualification for Champions League
2	ASA	26	15	5	6	55	27	+28	50	Qualification for CAF Cup
3	Petro do Huambo	26	12	6	8	31	30	+1	42	
4	Académica do Lobito	26	11	8	7	25	23	+2	41	
5	Interclube	26	9	9	8	24	23	+1	36	
6	Sagrada Esperança	26	9	9	8	20	22	−2	36	
7	Primeiro de Agosto	26	8	10	8	27	24	+3	34	
8	Benfica do Lubango	26	10	4	12	23	29	−6	34	
9	Benfica de Luanda	26	8	8	10	37	33	+4	32	
10	Sonangol do Namibe (Note: Name later changed to Atlético do Namibe)	26	9	5	12	17	28	−11	32	
11	FC de Cabinda	26	8	6	12	30	32	−2	30	
12	Progresso do Sambizanga (R)	26	4	13	9	19	31	−12	25	Relegation to Provincial stages
13	Bravos do Maquis (R)	26	5	9	12	29	44	−15	24	Relegation to Provincial stages
14	Primeiro de Maio (R)	26	5	6	15	13	44	−31	21	Relegation to Provincial stages

Updated to match(es) played on 16 December 2001. Source: Girabola.com
Rules for classification: 1) Points; 2) Head-to-head points; 3) Head-to-head goal difference; 4) Goal difference; 5) Goals scored; 6) Fair-play points; 7) Play-off.
(C) Champions; (R) Relegated

== Results ==
Home \ Away	ACL	ASA	BEN	BLB	BRA	FCC	INT	PET	PHU	PRI	MAI	PRO	SAG	SON
Académica do Lobito	—	0–0	1–0	2–0	1–0	2–1	0–0	1–0	2–1	0–1	3–0	0–0	0–0	1–0
ASA	5–1	—	2–6	1–0	6–2	2–1	2–1	1–1	3–0	2–1	5–1	6–0	1–0	5–1
Benfica de Luanda	0–2	1–0	—	3–1	4–2	5–2	0–0	2–3	0–0	3–2	3–1	0–1	0–1	0–2
Benfica do Lubango	2–0	1–2	1–0	—	3–2	2–1	1–0	0–0	2–2	1–0	2–0	2–1	2–1	0–0
Bravos do Maquis	1–1	2–3	3–2	0–0	—	3–0	0–0	2–3	1–0	1–1	1–0	0–0	0–0	1–0
FC de Cabinda	2–3	0–3	0–0	2–0	3–0	—	1–1	2–0	2–0	2–1	4–0	0–0	0–0	3–1
Interclube	0–1	2–1	1–1	2–1	1–0	1–0	—	0–2	3–1	1–0	0–1	1–1	1–0	1–0
Petro de Luanda	5–2	1–1	1–1	1–0	6–4	1–0	2–1	—	7–0	2–0	7–0	0–0	4–0	3–0
Petro do Huambo	1–0	0–3	0–0	5–1	3–0	1–1	0–0	1–3	—	1–0	1–0	3–2	3–0	2–0
Primeiro de Agosto	1–1	1–0	0–0	1–0	1–1	2–0	3–2	1–1	0–0	—	3–0	0–0	1–1	2–0
Primeiro de Maio	0–0	1–0	1–1	1–0	3–1	0–1	1–1	0–2	0–2	1–1	—	0–0	0–2	1–0
Progresso do Sambizanga	1–1	2–0	1–3	0–1	1–1	2–2	4–3	0–2	0–1	1–2	0–0	—	1–1	0–0
Sagrada Esperança	1–0	0–0	3–2	1–0	1–1	1–0	0–0	1–0	0–1	1–0	3–1	0–1	—	0–1
Sonangol do Namibe	1–0	0–0	2–0	1–0	1–0	1–0	0–1	0–3	0–2	2–2	1–0	2–0	1–1	—

Updated to match(es) played on 16 December 2001. Source: girabola.com
Legend: Blue = home team win; Yellow = draw; Red = away team win.

== Season statistics ==
=== Top scorers ===
Rank	Scorer	Club	Goals
1	(Angola) Flávio	Petro Luanda	23
2	(Angola) Adolfo	F.C. Cabinda	20
3	(Angola) Love	ASA	17

=== Most goals scored in a single match ===
Player	For	Against	S	R	Date
5 goals
(Angola) Love	ASA	Sonangol do Namibe	5–1 (H)	3	April 6, 2001
4 goals (Poker)
(Angola) Love	ASA	Progresso Sambizanga	6–0 (H)	10	June 24, 2001
(Angola) Flávio	Petro de Luanda	Sagrada Esperança	4–0 (H)	21	November 25, 2001
3 goals (Hat-trick)
(Angola) Flávio	Petro de Luanda	Bravos do Maquis	6–4 (H)	7	May 19, 2001

2001 Girabola winner

13th title

Squad: Avelino Lopes, Betinho, Caricoco, Chinho, Delgado, Deodato, Dias Caires, Didí, Flávio, Gilberto, Gui, Jonas, Lamá, Mbiyavanga, Mbunga, Nando, Renato, Zico
Head coach: Djalma Cavalcante
