= 1984 Taça de Angola =

The 1984 Taça de Angola was the 3rd edition of the Taça de Angola, the second most important and the top knock-out football club competition following the Girabola.

== Provincial stage ==
=== Benguela ===
Sat, 16 Jun 1984 1	Nacional de Benguela	3–2	Gaiatos de Benguela	Dondo
15:00

Sat, 16 Jun 1984 1	Primeiro de Maio	–	Desportivo de Benguela	Dondo
15:00

Sat, 16 Jun 1984 1	Académica do Lobito	–	União da Catumbela	Dondo
15:00

=== Cuanza Norte ===
Wed, 20 Jun 1984 1	Desp. da EKA	5–3	Dínamos SC	Dondo
15:00

Wed, 20 Jun 1984 1	Kwanza Textil	1–0	Desp. de Cambambe	Dondo
15:00

Wed, 20 Jun 1984 1	FC Golungo Alto	0–2	Inter	Dondo
15:00

Wed, 20 Jun 1984 1	Juv MINTEC	0–3	Juv da Vinelo	Dondo
15:00

Wed, 20 Jun 1984 1	Desp. do MINCI	0–3	Vitória de Camabatela	Dondo
15:00

Wed, 4 Jul 1984 2	Desp. da EKA	–	Kwanza Textil	Dondo
15:00

Wed, 4 Jul 1984 2	Juv da Vinelo	–	Vitória Camabatela	Dondo
15:00

Wed, 11 Jul 1984 Cuanza Norte F	Desp. da EKA	–	Juv da Vinelo	Dondo
15:00

=== Luanda ===
Wed, 13 Jun 1984 2	Desp. da TAAG	10–0	A.S. Escola	Luanda
21:00				Stadium: Coqueiros

Wed, 13 Jun 1984 2	Petro de Luanda	6–1	F.A.T.A.	Luanda
21:00				Stadium: Coqueiros

Wed, 13 Jun 1984 2	1º de Agosto	4–1	Textil	Luanda
21:00				Stadium: Coqueiros

Fri, 15 Jun 1984 2	Progresso	7–1	Cruz Vermelha	Luanda
21:00				Stadium: Coqueiros

Fri, 15 Jun 1984 2	SECIL	6–1	Porto de Luanda	Luanda
21:00				Stadium: Campo de S.Paulo

Sat, 16 Jun 1984 2	Belavista FC	3–1	FAMA	Luanda
21:00				Stadium: Campo de S.Paulo

Sat, 16 Jun 1984 2	Desp. da Cuca	7–1	Kaxicane	Luanda
21:00				Stadium: Campo de S.Paulo

Sat, 16 Jun 1984 2	EDAL	–	NOCAL	Luanda
21:00				Stadium: Campo de S.Paulo

Sat, 16 Jun 1984 2	F.C. de Luanda	6–2	SIGA	Luanda
21:00				Stadium: Campo de S.Paulo

Sat, 16 Jun 1984 2	Ferroviário de Luanda	–	UNIASES	Luanda
21:00				Stadium: Campo de S. Paulo

Sat, 16 Jun 1984 2	EDEL	1–2	Bangú FC	Luanda
21:00				Stadium: Campo de S.Paulo

Sat, 16 Jun 1984 2	Maxinde	–	Leões de Luanda	Luanda
21:00				Stadium: Campo de S. Paulo

Sat, 16 Jun 1984 2	Paviterra	–	SOCIBORDA	Luanda
21:00				Stadium: Campo de S. Paulo

Sat, 16 Jun 1984 2	Refrinor	–	Vitória Sambizanga	Luanda
21:00				Stadium: Campo de S. Paulo

Sat, 16 Jun 1984 2	E.T.P.	–	13 de Setembro	Luanda
21:00				Stadium: Campo de S. Paulo

Sat, 14 Jul 1984 3	Bangú FC	6–3	EDAL	Luanda
21:00				Stadium: Coqueiros

3	Inter de Luanda	10–0	CONDEL	Luanda
15:00

3	Desp. da TAAG	1–2	Indep. do Rangel	Luanda
15:00

Sat, 14 Jul 1984 3	F.C. de Luanda	–	E.T.P.	Luanda
15:00

Sat, 14 Jul 1984 3	Ind. do Rangel	–	UNIASES	Luanda
15:00

Sat, 14 Jul 1984 3	Inter de Luanda	–	Desp. da Cuca	Luanda
15:00

Wed, 11 Jul 1984 3	Primeiro de Agosto	4–0	Vitória Sambizanga	Luanda
15:00

Sat, 14 Jul 1984 3	Progresso Sambizanga	4–3	Leões de Luanda	Luanda
19:30				Stadium: Coqueiros

Fri, 13 Jul 1984 3	SECIL	5–2	Bela Vista	Luanda
19:30

Fri, 13 Jul 1984 3	SOCIBORDA	0–3	Petro de Luanda	Luanda
21:00

=== Lunda Sul ===
F	Sassamba da L.S.	2–0	Dínamos da L.S.	Saurimo
15:00

=== Malanje ===
F	Leões do Planalto	3–2	Veículos SC	Malanje
15:00

== National stage ==
Preliminary Rounds; 17 Sep–3 Oct 1984
17 Sep 1984 (pen)
Sassamba da L.S.	4
Nacional de Benguela	5
(Walkover)
11 de Novembro	3
Dínamos do Zaire	0
Sat, 5 Aug 2017
Palancas do Huambo	2
F.C. de Luanda	1
17 Sep 1984
Desportivo da EKA	0
Primeiro de Agosto	2
Sat, 5 Aug 2017
Vitória do Bié	1
Académica do Lobito	2
Petro do Huambo	6
Recreativo da Caála	0
Sat, 5 Aug 2017
Kilambas do K.S.	1
Guedal da Huíla	0
UNIASES	0
Petro de Luanda	4
F.C. de Cabinda	1
Inter de Luanda	5
Desp. de Benguela	3
Inter do Cunene	0
6 Oct 1984 (pen)
Desp. da Chela	5
Cooperação do Leste	4
17 Sep 1984
Leões do Planalto
Mambroa
Sat, 5 Aug 2017
Primeiro de Maio	6
Sonangol do Namibe	1
Sagrada Esperança
Habitação do Bengo
17 Sep 1984
Progresso Sambizanga	4
Bangú FC	2
3 Oct 1984
Desp. da SECIL	1
Construtores do Uíge	5

1/16 Finals; 21 Oct 1984
21 Oct 1984
Nacional de Benguela	3
11 de Novembro do K.K.	1
21 Oct 1984
Palancas do Huambo	0
Primeiro de Agosto	3
21 Oct 1984
Académica do Lobito	1
Petro do Huambo	2
21 Oct 1984 (pen)
Kilambas do KS	4
Petro de Luanda	5
21 Oct 1984
Inter de Luanda	0
Desp. de Benguela	2
14 Nov 1984
Desp. da Chela	3
Leões do Planalto	1
21 Oct 1984 (pen)
Primeiro de Maio	4
Sagrada Esperança	5
21 Oct 1984
Progresso Sambizanga	0
Construtores do Uíge	3

Quarterfinals; 3–20 Nov 1984
3 Nov 1984
Nacional de Benguela	0
1º de Agosto	1
14 Nov 1984 (pen)
Petro do Huambo	7
Petro de Luanda	6
20 Nov 1984 (pen)
Desp. de Benguela	5
Desp. da Chela	4
20 Nov 1984 (Walkover)
Sagrada Esperança	3
Construtores do Uíge	0

Semifinals; 17 / 22 Nov 1984
17 Nov 1984
1º de Agosto	1
Petro do Huambo	0
22 Nov 1984
Desp de Benguela
Sagrada Esperança

Final; Wed, 28 Nov 1984
Wed, 28 Nov 1984
1º de Agosto	2
Desp de Benguela	0
