= 1997 Girabola =

Girabola 1997
- Season: 1997 (–)
- Champions: Petro Luanda
- Relegated: Benfica; 1º de Maio
- 1997 CAF Champions League: Petro Luanda (Girabola winner)
- 1997 CAF Cup: Sagrada (Girabola 2nd place)
- Matches played: 210

The 1996 Girabola was the 19th season of top-tier football competition in Angola. Primeiro de Agosto were the defending champions.

The league comprised 14 teams, the bottom two of which were relegated.

Petro de Luanda were crowned champions, winning their 11th title, while Benfica do Huambo and Primeiro de Maio were relegated.

Zé Neli of Petro do Huambo finished as the top scorer with 12 goals.

== Changes from the 1996 season ==
Relegated: Nacional de Benguela
Promoted: FC de Cabinda, Kabuscorp, Sonangol do Namibe

Locations of the 1997 Girabola teams

== League table ==
Pos	Team	Pld	W	D	L	GF	GA	GD	Pts	Qualification or relegation
1	Petro de Luanda (C)	26	16	6	4	46	20	+26	54	Qualification for Champions League
2	Sagrada Esperança	26	15	5	6	41	26	+15	50	Qualification for CAF Cup
3	Sonangol do Namibe (Note: Name later changed to Atlético do Namibe)	26	10	9	7	33	25	+8	39	
4	Primeiro de Agosto	26	9	10	7	35	29	+6	37	
5	Petro do Huambo	26	9	8	9	30	32	−2	35	
6	Rangol (Note: Name later changed to Benfica de Luanda)	26	9	8	9	32	25	+7	35	
7	Kabuscorp	26	9	8	9	35	37	−2	35	
8	ASA	26	10	5	11	25	29	−4	35	
9	Académica do Lobito	26	7	12	7	25	29	−4	33	
10	FC de Cabinda	26	9	4	13	31	33	−2	31	
11	Progresso do Sambizanga	26	7	8	11	28	34	−6	29	
12	Independente do Tômbwa	26	8	5	13	23	35	−12	29	
13	Benfica do Huambo (R)	26	8	3	15	21	37	−16	27	Relegation to Provincial stages
14	Primeiro de Maio (R)	26	6	7	13	32	50	−18	25	Relegation to Provincial stages

Updated to match(es) played on 22 November 1997. Source: Girabola.com
Rules for classification: 1) Points; 2) Head-to-head points; 3) Head-to-head goal difference; 4) Goal difference; 5) Goals scored; 6) Fair-play points; 7) Play-off.
(C) Champions; (R) Relegated

== Results ==
Home \ Away	ACL	ASA	BHU	FCC	IND	KAB	PET	PHU	PRI	MAI	PRO	RAN	SAG	SON
Académica do Lobito	—													
ASA		—												
Benfica do Huambo			—											
FC de Cabinda				—										
Independente do Tômbwa					—									
Kabuscorp						—								
Petro de Luanda							—							
Petro do Huambo								—						
Primeiro de Agosto									—					
Primeiro de Maio										—				
Progresso do Sambizanga											—			
Rangol												—		
Sagrada Esperança													—	
Sonangol do Namibe														—

Updated to match(es) played on 22 November 1997. Source: girabola.com
Legend: Blue = home team win; Yellow = draw; Red = away team win.

== Season statistics ==
=== Top scorer ===
- (Angola) Zé Neli

== Champions ==
1997 Girabola winner
Atlético Petróleos de Luanda
11th title

Squad: Amaral, Aurélio, Betinho, Bodunha, Cacharamba, Chico Dinis, Delgado, Guedes, Gui, Joãozinho, Jonas, Langa, Maninho, Marito, Minhas, Nelo Bumba, Paulo Dias, Zico
Head coach: Jorge Ferreira
