= Taça de Angola =

- Founded: 1981
- Region: Angola
- Related competitions: Supertaça de Angola
- International cup: CAF Confederation Cup
- Current champions: Wiliete S.C. (2025–26)
- Most championships: Petro de Luanda (15 titles)
- 2025–26

This is about the Angolan football (soccer) competition. For the similarly named sports competitions, see Taça de Angola (basketball), Taça de Angola (handball) Taça de Angola (roller hockey)

The Taça de Angola (Portuguese pronunciation: [ˈtasɐ dɨ ɐ̃ˈɡɔlɐ]; lit. 'Cup of Angola') is an annual association football competition and the premier knockout tournament in Angolan football. The tournament is organized by the Angolan Football Federation and was first held in 1981. The winners qualify for the CAF Confederation Cup and also play for the Supertaça de Angola against the winners of that season's Girabola.

The inaugural winners were Huíla in 1981. Petro de Luanda are the most successful team in the competition, with 15 titles. Wiliete S.C. are the current title holders, defeating Kabuscorp S.C.P. 2-1 in the final on 31 May 2026.

== Finals ==
Thu, 10 Dec 1981	Huíla	4–2 (a.e.t.)	Malanje	Luanda
15:00	Basílio 15', 24'; Dala 90+13'; Tó Zé 90+25'		17' Pinheiro; 21' Jamaicano	Stadium: Coqueiros; Referee: Pereira Lopes; António Gonçalves, Eurico Barata

Thu, 30 Dec 1982	Primeiro de Maio	2–1	Petro do Huambo	Luanda
15:00	Maluka 48', 85'		8' Almeida	Stadium: Coqueiros; Referee: Júlio de Aveiro; Manuel Fernandes, Carlos Zacarias

Wed, 30 Nov 1983	Primeiro de Maio	9–1	11 de Novembro do KK	Luanda
21:00	Fusso 12' (pen.); Maluka 22', 45'; Fidéle 50', 66'; Daniel 80', 85', 87', 89'		60' Nené	Stadium: Coqueiros; Referee: Silva Cardoso Macenas; Jorge Mário

Wed, 28 Nov 1984	Primeiro de Agosto	2–0	Desportivo de Benguela	Luanda
15:30	N.Kwanza 20'; Nsuka 80'			Stadium: Coqueiros; Referee: Manuel Fernandes

Wed, 20 Nov 1985	Ferroviário da Huíla	2–0	Inter de Luanda	Luanda
15:00	Esp.Santo 6'; Barbosa			Stadium: Coqueiros; Referee: Dionísio de Almeida

Tue, 11 Nov 1986	Inter de Luanda	1–0	1º de Maio	Luanda
15:00	Aguião 10'			Stadium: Coqueiros; Referee: Joaquim Oliveira, António Mazanza, João Gonçalves

Wed, 11 Nov 1987	Petro de Luanda	4–1	Ferroviário da Huíla	Luanda
15:00	Jesus; Ndongala; Abel		Mavó	Stadium: Cidadela; Referee: Luciano Rosa

Fri, 11 Nov 1988	Sagrada Esperança	2–0 (a.e.t.)	FC de Cabinda	Luanda
15:00	Quintino 90+27'; Man'Adão 90+28'			Stadium: Coqueiros; Referee: Jorge Mário Fernandes

Sat, 11 Nov 1989	Ferroviário da Huíla	2–1	Inter de Luanda	Luanda
15:00	Jorgito 19'; Mavó 62'		76' Mingo	Stadium: Cidadela; Referee: João Gonçalves

Mon, 17 Sep 1990	1º de Agosto	1–0	Petro de Luanda	Luanda
15:00	Fuidimau 7'			Stadium: Cidadela; Referee: Eduardo Marcos, Charumbo Neto, Eduardo Ferreira

Mon, 11 Nov 1991	1º de Agosto	2–1 (a.e.t.)	Petro de Luanda	Luanda
15:00	Mbila 61'; Loth 90+5' (pen.)		71' Luizinho	Stadium: Cidadela; Referee: Jorge Mário Fernandes

Sun, 27 Sep 1992	Petro de Luanda	3–2	1º de Agosto	Luanda
17:00	N.Bumba 15'; C.Dinis 34'; Felito 89' (pen.)		2' Ndisso; Kiss	Stadium: Cidadela; Attendance: 70,000; Referee: João Gonçalves

Sun, 10 Oct 1993	Petro de Luanda	2–1	ASA	Luanda
15:00	Oliveira 45'; Amaral 68'		10' Arlindo	Stadium: Cidadela; Referee: Manuel Fernandes; Luciano António, Leopoldo Mavunza

Sun, 4 Dec 1994	Petro de Luanda	0–0	Independente	Luanda
15:30				Stadium: Cidadela; Referee: Oliveira Pinto; Francisco Tomás, Elísio Francisco

Wed, 7 Dec 1994	Petro de Luanda	2–1	Independente	Luanda
15:30	N.Bumba; Paulito (pen.)		Tostão	Stadium: Cidadela; Referee: Mário J. Fernandes

Sat, 11 Nov 1995	ASA	3–1	Independente	Luanda
15:00	B.Carmelino 8', 21'; Quinzinho 30'		17' Lopes	Stadium: Cidadela; Referee: Jorge Mário Fernandes; Diogo Ferreira, Roberto Talaya

Mon, 11 Nov 1996	1º de Maio	1–1	Progresso	Luanda
15:00	Jorge 54'		72' Vidal	Stadium: Cidadela

Wed, 20 Nov 1996	Progresso	1–0	1º de Maio	Luanda
15:00	Vidal 28'			Stadium: Cidadela

Tue, 27 Oct 1997	Petro de Luanda	2–1	1º de Agosto	Luanda
15:00	Amaral 20'; Maninho		13' Dé	Stadium: Cidadela

Wed, 11 Nov 1998	Petro de Luanda	4–1	1º de Agosto	Luanda
15:00	Guedes 22', 50'; Zico 58'; Betinho 61'		19' Nsilulu	Stadium: Cidadela; Referee: Jorge Mário Fernandes

Thu, 11 Nov 1999	Sagrada	1–0	ASA	Luanda
15:00	Jaburú			Stadium: Cidadela; Referee: João Soyamba

Sat, 11 Nov 2000	Petro de Luanda	1–0	Inter de Luanda	Luanda
15:00	Flávio 80'			Stadium: Cidadela

Mon, 11 Nov 2001	Sonangol Namibe	3–2	Sporting Cabinda	Luanda
15:00	Lukikana 3'; Hugo 16'; Tony 34'		36' (pen.) Tyson; 62' Lucien	Stadium: Cidadela; Referee: José António de Sousa

Mon, 11 Nov 2002	Petro de Luanda	3–0	Desp da Huíla	Luanda
15:00	Renato 38'; Mbunga 65', 88'			Stadium: Cidadela; Attendance: 30,000; Referee: Carlos Lopes

Tue, 11 Nov 2003	Interclube	1–0 (a.e.t.)	Sagrada	Luanda
15:00	Paty 90+29'	Report		Stadium: Cidadela; Attendance: 3,500; Referee: Muanza Romano; Nsundidi Armando, Manuel Patriota

Thu, 11 Nov 2004	Sonangol	2–0	1º de Agosto	Luanda
15:30	Capick 34'; Nuno 83'			Stadium: Cidadela; Referee: Luís Manuel João

Fri, 11 Nov 2005	ASA	1–0	Interclube	Luanda
15:00	Kadima 83'	Report		Stadium: Cidadela; Attendance: 2,000; Referee: Domingos Pedro; Luciano António, Inácio Cândido

Sat, 11 Nov 2006	1º de Agosto	1–1 (a.e.t.) (4–3 p)	Benfica de Luanda	Luanda
15:00	Gazeta 45+1'	Report	62' Vado	Stadium: Cidadela; Referee: Pedro dos Santos; Pedro Mussungo, Inácio Candido
	Penalties
	Riquinho (penalty scored)		(penalty missed) Eros; (penalty missed) Ekoboló

Sun, 11 Nov 2007	1º de Maio	1–0	Benfica de Luanda	Luanda
15:00	Adolfo 76' (pen.); Fita 90+5'	Report	37' Bena	Stadium: Cidadela; Attendance: 3.000; Referee: Pedro dos Santos; Inácio Cândido, Denilson Gourgel

Tue, 11 Nov 2008	Santos FC	1–0	Rec do Libolo	Luanda
15:00	Manucho 90+'	Report		Stadium: Coqueiros; Attendance: 4.000; Referee: Muluta Prata; Luciano António, Zeferino Muanda

Wed, 11 Nov 2009	1º de Agosto	2–1	Sagrada Esperança	Luanda
15:00	Fofaná 15'; Love 67'	Report	87' Fatite	Stadium: Cidadela; Attendance: 10.000; Referee: Fernando Mação; Domingos Adão, Wilson Ntyamba

Thu, 11 Nov 2010	ASA	0–0 (a.e.t.) (4–3 p)	Interclube	Luanda
16:00		Report		Stadium: Cidadela; Referee: Hélder Martins; Denilson Gourgel, Victor Paulino
	Penalties
	Bokungu (penalty scored); Lau (penalty missed); Anastácio (penalty missed); Nuno (penalty scored); Jamba (penalty scored); Papi (penalty scored)		(penalty scored) P.Henriques; (penalty scored) Capuco; (penalty scored) Joel; (penalty missed) Nari; (penalty missed) Tsherry; (penalty missed) Diop

Fri, 11 Nov 2011	Interclube	1–1 (a.e.t.) (5–3 p)	1º de Agosto	Luanda
16:00	Alex 79'	Report	39' Amaro	Stadium: 11 de Novembro; Attendance: 10,000; Referee: Hélder Martins; Inácio Cândido, Diakanua Miguel

Sun, 11 Nov 2012	Petro de Luanda	2–0	Recreativo Caála	Luanda
16:00	Mabululu 71', 90+2'			Stadium: 11 de Novembro; Attendance: 10.000

Mon, 11 Nov 2013	Petro de Luanda	1–0	Desportivo da Huíla	Luanda
16:00	Keita 50'	Report		Stadium: 11 de Novembro; Attendance: 10.000; Referee: Paulo Talaya; Pedro Kanombo, Ricardo Daniel

Sun, 23 Nov 2014	Benfica de Luanda	1–0 (a.e.t.)	Petro de Luanda	Luanda
16:00	Braga 90+23'	Report		Stadium: 11 de Novembro; Attendance: 20.000; Referee: Osvaldo Félix; José Félix, Rosário Pedro

Sat, 31 Oct 2015	Bravos do Maquis	1–0	Sagrada Esperança	Luanda
15:00	Bruno 90'	Report		Stadium: Coqueiros; Attendance: 3.000; Referee: João Goma; Pedro Canombo, Júlio Lemos

Fri, 11 Nov 2016	Rec do Libolo	2–1	Progresso	Luanda
15:00	Erivaldo 23'; Ito 90+10'	Report	84' Vá	Stadium: 11 de Novembro; Attendance: 10,000; Referee: Hélder Martins; Júlio Lemos, Joaquim da Rocha

Sat, 11 Nov 2017	Petro de Luanda	2–1	1º de Agosto	Luanda
15:00	Job 40'; Azulão 56'		56' Diogo	Stadium: 11 de Novembro; Referee: João Goma; Ivanildo Lopes, Evanildo Martins

Sat, 25 May 2018	1º de Agosto	2–1	Desportivo Huíla	Luanda
15:40	Zito 59'; Papel 63' (pen.)	Report	45+1' Lionel	Stadium: 11 de Novembro; Referee: Benjamin Andrade; Bernabé Ngulo, Ricardo Daniel

Thu, 15 Jul 2021	Petro de Luanda	2–0	Interclube	Luanda
16:00	Pirolito 12' (o.g.); Figueira 85'	Report		Stadium: 11 de Novembro; Referee: Nuno Sumbo; Joaquim Chio, Lucas Caliongo

Sun, 12 June 2022	Petro de Luanda	2–1 (a.e.t.)	Desportivo Huíla	Lubango
	Kinito 28'; Azulão 114'		Dino 70'	Stadium: Nacional da Tundavala

Sat, 3 June 2023	Petro de Luanda	3–0	Académica do Lobito	Lubango
	Azulão 18' (pen.), 26'; Carlinhos 77'			Stadium: Nacional da Tundavala; Attendance: 15.000; Referee: Francisco Chitano

Sat, 23 June 2024	Petro de Luanda	2–0	Bravos do Maquis	Saurimo
	Julinho 32', 63'			Stadium: Estádio das Mangueiras; Attendance: 7,000

Sat, 31 May 2025	Kabuscorp	1–0	1⁰ de Agosto	Luanda
	Wilfried Yessoh 6'			Stadium: 11 de Novembro; Referee: Nelson da Silva

Mon, 31 May 2026	Wiliete de Benguela	2–1	Kabuscorp	Huambo
16:00	César Cangué 42'; Júnior Goiano 46'		Benarfa 77'	Stadium: Estádio Daniel Cassoma Lutucuta; Referee: Airton Cardlin

== Titles by team ==
Pos	Club	Won	Years won
1	Petro de Luanda	15	1987, 1992, 1993, 1994, 1997, 1998, 2000, 2002, 2012, 2013, 2017, 2020–21, 2021–22, 2022–23, 2023–24
2	Primeiro de Agosto	6	1984, 1990, 1991, 2006, 2009, 2018–19
3	Interclube	3	1986, 2003, 2011
3	ASA	3	1995, 2005, 2010
3	Primeiro de Maio	3	1982, 1983, 2007
6	Sonangol do Namibe	2	2001, 2004
6	Sagrada Esperança	2	1988, 1999
6	Ferroviário da Huíla	2	1985, 1989
10	Wiliete de Benguela	1	2026
10	Kabuscorp	1	2025
10	Recreativo do Libolo	1	2016
10	Bravos do Maquis	1	2015
10	Benfica de Luanda	1	2014
10	Santos FC	1	2008
10	Progresso do Sambizanga	1	1996

== Managers ==
Year	Club	Coach
1981	Selecção da Huíla	(Angola) Damião Pinto
1982	Primeiro de Maio	(Portugal) Emílio Ventura
1983	Primeiro de Maio	(Serbia) Petar Kzernević
1984	Primeiro de Agosto	(Angola) Napoleão Brandão
1985	Ferroviário da Huíla	(Angola) David Sousa
1986	Inter de Luanda	(Angola) Joca Santinho
1987	Petro de Luanda	(Brazil) Antônio Clemente
1988	Sagrada Esperança	(Angola) Adé
1989	Ferroviário da Huíla	(Argentina) Rúben Garcia
1990	1º de Agosto	(Serbia) Dušan Condić

Year	Club	Coach
1991	1º de Agosto	(Serbia) Dušan Condić
1992	Petro de Luanda	(Serbia) Gojko Zec
1993	Petro de Luanda	(Serbia) Gojko Zec
1994	Petro de Luanda	(Serbia) Gojko Zec
1995	ASA	(Angola) João Machado
1996	Progresso	(Angola) Joaquim Dinis
1997	Petro de Luanda	(Brazil) Jorge Ferreira
1998	Petro de Luanda	(Brazil) Jorge Ferreira
1999	Sagrada Esperança	(Angola) João Machado
2000	Petro de Luanda	(Brazil) Djalma Cavalcante

Year	Club	Coach
2001	Desportivo Sonangol	(Angola) Zeca Amaral
2002	Petro de Luanda	(Brazil) José Roberto Ávila
2003	Interclube	(Serbia) Zoran Pešić
2004	Desportivo Sonangol	(Angola) Romeu Filemon
2005	ASA	(Angola) Bernardino Pedroto
2006	1º de Agosto	(Netherlands) Jan Brouwer
2007	Primeiro de Maio	(Angola) Rui Teixeira
2008	Santos F.C.	(Angola) Mário Calado
2009	1º de Agosto	(Angola) Humberto Chaves
2010	ASA	(Portugal) José Dinis

Year	Club	Coach
2011	Interclube	(Portugal) António Caldas
2012	Petro de Luanda	(Angola) Miller Gomes
2013	Petro de Luanda	(Portugal) José Dinis
2014	Benfica de Luanda	(Angola) Zeca Amaral
2015	Bravos do Maquis	(Angola) Alberto Cardeau
2016	Rec do Libolo	(Portugal) João Paulo Costa
2017	Petro de Luanda	(Brazil) Beto Bianchi
2018	cancelled	
2018–19	Primeiro de Agosto	(Bosnia and Herzegovina) Dragan Jović
2019–20	cancelled	

Year	Club	Coach
2020–21	Petro de Luanda	(Angola) Bodunha
2021–22	Petro de Luanda	(Portugal) Alexandre Santos
2022–23	Petro de Luanda	(Portugal) Alexandre Santos

== Participation details ==
=== 2000–2020 ===
Club
Club	PRO	2000	2001	2002	2003	2004	2005	2006	2007	2008	2009	2010	2011	2012	2013	2014	2015	2016	2017	2018–19	
Club /# teams		16	17	17	19	21	16	17	18	18	23	22	25	20	18	24	23	22	23	24	–
15 de Setembro	LDS				R16																1
17 de Maio	BGL												R16								1
21 de Janeiro	CAB					PR															1
4 de Abril	CCU															R16	R16	PR			3
Académica do Lobito	BGL	R16	QF	R16	R16	PR	R16			R16	R16		PR	PR			PR	QF	R16	R16	14
Académica Soyo	ZAI	SF				R16	QF	R16	R16		SF	QF		QF	R16	PR					10
Adecofil	CCU																		PR		1
Águias SC do Uíge	UIG					PR															1
Ajuda Social	LDS																		PR		1
AKC do Cunene	CUN																		PR	PR	3
ARA da Gabela	CSL	PR																			1
ASA	LUA	QF	QF	R16	SF	R16	CH	R16	QF	R16	R16	CH	R16	R16	PR	R16	PR	R16	R16	R16	19
ASK Dragão	UIG																		PR		1
Atlético do Namibe	NMB	QF	CH	R16	PR	CH	R16	QF	R16		R16		PR	PR	R16						12
Baixa de Cassanje	MLG									PR	PR	PR	PR								4
Benfica de Luanda	LUA	R16	R16	R16	R16	R16	R16	RU	RU	R16	R16	PR	SF	QF	QF	CH	R16	R16			17
Benfica do Huambo	HBO												PR								1
Benfica do Lubango	HLA		PR	PR	PR			R16	QF	R16	PR	QF				PR				WD	10
Bravos do Maquis	MOX		R16	R16		R16		R16	R16	R16	R16	R16	R16	R16	QF	R16	CH	QF	SF	QF	16
Brilhantes da Quissama	BGO					QF															1
Cambondo	MLG	PR																			1
Casa Helu	LDN										PR										1
Cuando Cubango	CCU																	R16		R16	2
Construtores do Uíge	UIG															PR					1
Desportivo da Huíla	HLA			RU	R16	SF	R16	R16	R16	QF	SF	R16	PR		RU	QF	R16			RU	14
Desportivo do Bengo	BGO		QF																		1
Desportivo do Keve	CSL					R16															1
Domant FC	BGO											R16	QF	R16		PR	QF	SF	R16	R16	8
Estrela José Sita	CAB											PR									1
Evale FC	CUN													R16							1
FC da Corimba	LUA	PR																			1
FC de Cabinda	CAB	QF	R16	R16	R16							PR	PR								6
Ferroviário de Luanda	LUA		R16																		1
Ferroviário do Huambo	HBO																			WD	1
Inter do Moxico	MOX							R16													1
Interclube	LUA	RU	R16	R16	CH	SF	RU	R16	R16	QF	QF	RU	CH	QF	SF	R16	SF	QF	QF	SF	19
Ismael FC	UIG																R16				1
J.G.M.	HBO																	R16	R16		2
Jackson Garcia	BGL															PR		R16	PR		3
Juventude do Moxico	MOX								QF												1
Kabuscorp	LUA								PR	QF	R16	R16	QF	R16	R16	SF	QF	R16	QF	QF	12
Kakuvas do Cunene	CUN							PR													1
Lacrau Army	MOX					PR															1
Lândana FC	CAB								PR												1
Mpatu a Ponta	BGO																PR				1
Nacional de Benguela	BGL													PR							1
Norberto de Castro	LUA												R16	R16	QF						3
Paraná FC	LUA				QF																1
Paulo FC	BGO																			WD	1
Petro de Luanda	LUA	CH	QF	CH	R16	QF	R16	SF	SF	R16	QF	R16	PR	CH	CH	RU	SF	SF	CH	SF	19
Petro do Huambo	HBO		SF	QF	SF	QF	R16		R16	R16	PR										8
Polivalentes FC	LUA						R16									PR	PR				3
Polivalente KS	CSL																	PR			1
Porcelana FC	BGO											PR	PR		R16	R16	R16				5
Primeiro de Agosto	LUA	R16	R16	SF	QF	RU	SF	CH	SF	QF	CH	QF	RU	R16	R16	QF	R16	PR	RU	CH	19
Primeiro de Maio	BGL		R16	R16	PR	R16	QF	QF	CH	SF	R16		SF		PR	PR	PR	PR	QF	PR	16
Progresso da LS	LDS																PR	R16	R16		3
Progresso do Sambizanga	LUA	R16	SF	QF	R16	R16	QF	R16		R16	PR	R16	R16	SF	R16	SF	QF	RU	SF	QF	18
Real M'buco	ZAI										PR						PR				2
Recreativo da Caála	HBO					PR					QF	R16	QF	RU	SF	R16	R16	PR	R16	R16	11
Recreativo da Kafanda	BGO										PR										1
Recreativo do Chingo	CSL											PR									1
Recreativo do Libolo	CSL								R16	RU	R16	SF	R16	QF	QF	QF	QF	CH	R16	R16	12
Ritondo	MLG				QF																1
Sagrada Esperança	LDN	QF	R16	SF	RU	R16	SF	SF	QF	SF	RU	SF	R16	SF	R16	R16	RU	QF	R16	R16	19
Santa Rita de Cássia	UIG																	PR	QF	QF	3
Santos FC	LUA							QF	R16	CH	QF	QF	QF	R16	R16						8
Saurimo FC	LDS																			PR	1
Semba FC	CAB																			WD	1
Sporting de Cabinda	CAB	R16	RU	QF	QF	QF	QF	QF		PR		R16	R16	PR		QF	R16	PR⋅	PR	WD	16
Sporting do Bié	BIE	SF		QF			R16												PR		4
Sporting do Sumbe	CSL				R16																1
Stad do Uíge	UIG												PR								1
Talentosos do Pai Joca	CAB															PR					1
União do Uíge	UIG															R16					1
Wiliete SC	BGL																			R16	1
# Teams		2000 16	2001 17	2002 17	2003 19	2004 21	2005 16	2006 17	2007 18	2008 18	2009 23	2010 22	2011 25	2012 20	2013 18	2014 24	2015 23	2016 22	2017 23	2018–19 24	

=== 1982–1990 ===
Club
Club	1982	1983	1984	1985	1986	1987	1988	1989	1990	
Club /# teams	X	X	X	X	X	X	X	X	X	–
3 de Dezembro (LS)		P1								1
11 de Novembro (KK)	R16	RU			R32	R32				2
14 de Abril (Cabinda)										1
15 de Fevereiro (Zaire)					R32	R32				1
17 de Setembro (LS)		PSF								1
27 de Março (Cabinda)	PQF									1
9 de Janeiro (Cabinda)						R32				1
Águias do Belize										1
Andorinhas do MINCI	QF									2
Avante Juventude										1
B.C.R.		PSF								1
Bangú FC	P1	PQF								2
Cambondo		PF				R16				1
CIFAL										1
Comércio Sport de Benguela					R32					1
Construtores de Cabinda	PQF									1
Construtores de Malanje	QF	R16								2
Construtores do Uíge	SF	QF	QF	QF		R32				2
Construtores do Zaire	R16									1
Cooperação do Leste		QF								1
Cruz Vermelha da LS		PF								1
Desportivo da Chela			QF	R16	SF	R16				1
Desportivo da Cuca	P1									1
Desportivo da EKA	R16	SF								2
Desportivo da Guedal	PSF									1
Desportivo da SECIL		P1								1
Desportivo da Sonor					R32					1
Desportivo da TAAG	PF	PQF			SF	R16				2
Desportivo de Benguela		PSF	RU	R16	QF	R16				1
Desportivo de Cambambe										1
Desportivo de Quilengues		P1								1
Desportivo do Tchioco		PF								1
Desportivo Welwitchia	PSF									1
Diabos do Leste		P1								1
Dínamos da LS		P1								1
Dínamos de Ndalatando										1
Dínamos do Bengo						R32				1
Dínamos do Moxico					R32	R32				1
Dínamos do Sumbe				R16	R32	QF				1
Educação do Huambo	P1	PSF								2
Electro SC Huambo		PSF								1
Estrela de Angola	PQF									1
Evestang						R32				1
F.C. de Cabinda					R16	SF				1
F.C. de Luanda	P1									1
F.C. do Lubango					R16					1
F.C. do Moxico	R16									1
Ferroviário da Huíla	QF	SF		CH	QF	RU				2
Ferroviário de Luanda		P1								1
Ferroviário do Huambo	P1									1
Ferroviário do Namibe	R16	PSF				R32				2
Gaiatos de Benguela				R16						1
Independentes do Golfe	PQF									1
Inter da Huíla	PSF	P1				R32				2
Inter da Lunda Sul				QF	R32					1
Inter de Cabinda	PQF									1
Inter de Luanda	P1	P1	R16	RU	CH	QF				2
Inter de Ndalatando		PF			R16	R32				1
Inter do Cunene						R32				1
Inter do Namibe		R16			R32					1
Jovens de Caxito	R16									1
Juventude do Kunje		PF								1
Kilambas do Kwanza Sul						R32				1
Kwanza Textil		P1								1
Leões de Luanda	P1	PSF			R32	R32				2
Leões do Lobito		PSF								1
Leões do Planalto				SF						1
Madeiras do Buco Zau	PQF									1
Mambroa	PF	PF		R16	QF	R32				2
Maxinde		P1								1
MINTEC		P1								1
Nacional de Benguela		PF								1
Ngoio Sport Clube	QF									1
Operários da Vinelo		P1								1
Palancas do Huambo										1
Petro de Luanda	PSF	PF	QF	SF	R16	CH				2
Petro do Bié	R16									1
Petro do Huambo	RU	R16	SF	QF	R16	R16				2
Primeiro de Agosto	PQF	P1	CH	R16	R32	R16				2
Primeiro de Maio	CH	CH		QF	RU	SF				2
Primeiro de Maio (Cabinda)		R16								1
Primeiro de Maio (L.Norte)						R32				1
Progresso da Saúde da LS		PSF								1
Progresso do Sambizanga	SF	R16				QF				2
Recreativo da Caála	PR	P1			QF					2
Sagrada Esperança	R16	QF	SF	R16	R32	R16				2
Sassamba da Lunda Sul	R16					R32				2
Sociborda					R32					1
Sonangol do Namibe	PR	PF								2
Têxtil de Luanda		P1								1
União Sport do Bié					R16	QF				1
Uniases	P1									1
U.S. Leões de Cabinda					R32					1
Veículos de Malanje					R16					1
Vitória Atlético do Bié						R16				1
Vitória de Camabatela		P1								1
Vitória do Sambizanga	PSF									1
Zebras da LS		P1			R16					1
Zebras do Bengo		QF			R32					1
zzz										1
# Teams	1982 X	1983 X	1984 X	1985 X	1986 X	1987 X	1988 X	1989 X	1990 X	

=== 1982–1990 National stage brackets ===
==== 1987 ====
Round of 32; 17–31 May 1987
17/31 May 1987
Primeiro de Agosto	7 – 3
Inter do Cunene	2 – 1
16/30 May 1987
Inter de Luanda	2 – 2
Inter da Huíla	0 – 4
17/31 May 1987
Sassamba da Lunda Sul	1 – 0
Petro de Luanda	2 – 6
17/31 May 1987
Desp. de Benguela	1 – 2
Mambroa	0 – 1
31 May 1987
Dínamos do Sumbe	3 – 0
Vitória do Bié	0 – 1
17/30 May 1987
Kilambas do Kwanza Sul	2 – 0
Leões de Luanda	2 – 1
31 May 1987
F.C. de Cabinda	6
Dínamos do Moxico	0
17/30 May 1987
Petro do Huambo	11
15 de Novembro	0
17/30 May 1987
Inter do Kwanza Norte	1 – 1
Progresso Sambizanga	2 – 3
17/30 May 1987
Desp. da TAAG	3 – 1
9 de Janeiro de Cabinda	1 – 0
17/31 May 1987
1º de Maio da L.Norte	0 – 0
1º de Maio Benguela	4 – 2
17/31 May 1987
Desp. da Chela	1 – 3
Ferroviário do Namibe	0 – 1
17/31 May 1987
Dínamos do Bengo	0 – 1
Cambondo de Malanje	1 – 3
17/30 May 1987
União Sport do Bié	1 – 3
Evestang do Huambo	1 – 2
17/31 May 1987
Construtores do Uíge	1 – 1
Ferroviário da Huíla	3 – 0
31 May 1987
11 de Novembro do KK	0 – 2
Sagrada Esperança	2 – 4

Round of 16; 14–27 Jul 1987
15/26 Jul 1987
1º de Agosto	1 – 1
Inter de Luanda	3 – 0
16/26 Jul 1987 (pen)
Petro de Luanda	0 – 1(5)
Desp. de Benguela	1 – 0(3)
8 Aug 1987
Dínamos do Sumbe	1 – 0
Leões de Luanda	0 – 0
17 Aug 1986
F.C. de Cabinda	0 – 2
Petro do Huambo	0 – 2
14/25 Jul 1987
Progresso	2 – 4
Desp. da TAAG	3 – 3
15/25 Jul 1987
Primeiro de Maio	2 – 2
Desp. da Chela	1 – 2
13/25 Jul 1987
Cambondo	2 – 0
União Sport do Bié	0 – 4
13/26 Jul 1987
Ferroviário da Huíla	1 – 3
Sagrada Esperança	0 – 2

Quarterfinals; 5–20 Sep 1987
6/20 Sep 1987
Inter de Luanda	3 - 0
Petro de Luanda	3 - 2
5/20 Sep 1987
Dínamos do Sumbe	1 – 0
F.C. de Cabinda	0 – 2
5/20 Sep 1987
Progresso	1 – 0
Primeiro de Maio	1 – 1
6/20 Sep 1987
União Sport do Bié	1 – 2
Ferroviário da Huíla	4 – 4

Semifinals; 10–25 Oct 1987
10/24 Oct 1987
Petro de Luanda	4 – 1
F.C. de Cabinda	1 – 0
14/25 Oct 1987
Primeiro de Maio	1 - 0
Ferroviário da Huíla	0 - 3

Final; 11 Nov 1987
Wed, 11 Nov 1987
Petro de Luanda	4
Ferroviário da Huíla	1

==== 1986 ====
Round of 32; 20 Jul—6 Aug 1986
Inter do Kwanza Norte
Inter da Lunda Sul
20 Jul 1986
Leões de Cabinda	0
Desp. de Benguela	1
20 Jul 1986
11 de Novembro
Desp. da Chela
20 Jul 1986
União Sport do Bié	1
Dínamos do Sumbe	0
20 Jul 1986
Veículos de Malanje
Inter do Cunene
20 Jul 1986
Ferroviário da Huíla	10
Desportivo da Sonor	1
20 Jul 1986
Construtores do Uíge
Inter de Luanda
20 Jul 1986 (pen)
Sociborda	(5)
Petro do Huambo	(6)
20 Jul 1986
Inter do Namibe	1
Primeiro de Maio	3
20 Jul 1986
Comércio Sport Clube	0
Petro de Luanda	2
Dínamos do Moxico
Mambroa
20 Jul 1986
F.C. do Lubango
1º de Agosto
F.C. de Cabinda
20 Jul 1986
Desp. da TAAG	2
Leões de Luanda	0
20 Jul 1986
Zebras do Bengo	6
15 de Fevereiro	4
6 Aug 1986
Recreativo da Caála	1
Sagrada Esperança	0

Round of 16; 17 Aug 1986
17 Aug 1986
Inter do Kwanza Norte	1
Desp. de Benguela	4
17 Aug 1986
Desp. da Chela	2
União Petro do Bié	0
17 Aug 1986
Veículos de Malanje	1
Ferroviário da Huíla	3
17 Aug 1986
Inter de Luanda	1
Petro do Huambo	0
17 Aug 1986 (pen)
Primeiro de Maio	0(4)
Petro de Luanda	0(2)
17 Aug 1986 (pen)
Mambroa	1(4)
F.C. do Lubango	1(2)
17 Aug 1986
F.C. de Cabinda	1
Desp. da TAAG	2
17 Aug 1986
Zebras da Lunda Sul	0
Rec. da Caála	2

Quarterfinals; 20–21 Sep 1986
21 Sep 1986
Desp. de Benguela	0
Desp. da Chela	1
21 Sep 1986
Ferroviário da Huíla	0
Inter de Luanda	1
20 Sep 1986
Primeiro de Maio	2
Mambroa	0
21 Sep 1986
Desp. da TAAG	2
Rec. da Caála	1

Semifinals; 29 Oct 1986
29 Oct 1986 (pen)
Desp. da Chela	0(2)
Inter de Luanda	0(5)
29 Oct 1986
Primeiro de Maio	2
Desp. da TAAG	0

Final; 11 Nov 1986
Wed, 11 Nov 1986
Inter de Luanda	2
Primeiro de Maio	0

==== 1985 ====
Round of 32; 25 Aug 1985
25 Aug 1985
Dínamos do Moxico
Desp. de Benguela
25 Aug 1985 (pen)
Ferroviário da Huíla	2(7)
Dínamos do Zaire	2(6)
25 Aug 1985
Primeiro de Maio	7
Vitória do Bié	6
25 Aug 1985
Desp. da Chela	5
F.C. de Cabinda	0
25 Aug 1985
Construtores do Uíge	2
Desportivo da EKA	0
25 Aug 1985
Gaiatos de Benguela
Cadá
25 Aug 1985
Desp. da TAAG	2
F.C. do Lubango	0
25 Aug 1985
Inter do Zaire	0
Petro de Luanda	2
25 Aug 1985
11 de Novembro	2
Inter de Luanda	4
25 Aug 1985
Zebras do Bengo	1
Primeiro de Agosto	6
6 Oct 1984
Petro do Huambo	4
Palancas do Huambo	0
25 Aug 1985
Dínamos do Kwanza Sul
Dínamos do Kwanza Norte
25 Aug 1985
Inter da Lunda Sul	2
Dínamos da Lunda Norte	1
25 Aug 1985
Sagrada Esperança	3
Dínamos de Malanje	0
25 Aug 1985
Desp. da Cuca	0
Leões do Planalto	0
25 Aug 1985
Mambroa	3
Ferroviário do Namibe	0

Round of 16; 15–17 Sep 1985
17 Sep 1985
Desp. de Benguela
Ferroviário da Huíla
15 Sep 1985
Primeiro de Maio	4
Desp. da Chela	0
17 Sep 1985
Construtores do Uíge
Gaiatos de Benguela
17 Sep 1985 (pen)
Desp. da TAAG
Petro de Luanda
15 Sep 1985
Inter de Luanda	4
Primeiro de Agosto	3
15 Sep 1985
Petro do Huambo
Dínamos do Kwanza Sul
15 Sep 1985 (pen)
Inter da Lunda Sul	7
Sagrada Esperança	5
15 Sep 1985
Leões do Planalto	1
Mambroa	0

Quarterfinals; 6–9 Oct 1985
6 Oct 1985
Ferroviário da Huíla	1
Primeiro de Maio	0
9 Oct 1985
Construtores do Uíge	0
Petro de Luanda	1
6 Oct 1985
Inter de Luanda	3
Petro do Huambo	1
9 Oct 1985
Inter da Lunda Sul
Leões do Planalto

Semifinals; 16–17 Nov 1985
17 Nov 1984
Ferroviário da Huíla	1
Petro de Luanda	0
16 Nov 1985
Inter de Luanda	5
Leões do Planalto	2

Final; Wed, 20 Nov 1985
Wed, 20 Nov 1985
Ferroviário da Huíla	2
Inter de Luanda	0

==== 1984 ====
Preliminary Rounds; 17 Sep–3 Oct 1984
17 Sep 1984 (pen)
Sassamba da L.S.	4
Nacional de Benguela	5
(Walkover)
11 de Novembro	3
Dínamos do Zaire	0
Mon, 17 Sep 1984
Palancas do Huambo	2
F.C. de Luanda	1
17 Sep 1984
Desportivo da EKA	0
Primeiro de Agosto	2
Sat, 5 Aug 2017
Vitória do Bié	1
Académica do Lobito	2
Petro do Huambo	6
Recreativo da Caála	0
Sat, 5 Aug 2017
Kilambas do K.S.	1
Guedal da Huíla	0
UNIASES	0
Petro de Luanda	4
F.C. de Cabinda	1
Inter de Luanda	5
Desp. de Benguela	3
Inter do Cunene	0
6 Oct 1984 (pen)
Desp. da Chela	5
Cooperação do Leste	4
17 Sep 1984
Leões do Planalto
Mambroa
Sat, 5 Aug 2017
Primeiro de Maio	6
Sonangol do Namibe	1
Sagrada Esperança
Habitação do Bengo
17 Sep 1984
Progresso Sambizanga	4
Bangú FC	2
3 Oct 1984
Desp. da SECIL	1
Construtores do Uíge	5

1/16 Finals; 21 Oct 1984
21 Oct 1984
Nacional de Benguela	3
11 de Novembro	1
21 Oct 1984
Palancas do Huambo	0
Primeiro de Agosto	3
21 Oct 1984
Académica do Lobito	1
Petro do Huambo	2
21 Oct 1984 (pen)
Kilambas do KS	4
Petro de Luanda	5
21 Oct 1984
Inter de Luanda	0
Desp. de Benguela	2
14 Nov 1984
Desp. da Chela	3
Leões do Planalto	1
21 Oct 1984 (pen)
Primeiro de Maio	4
Sagrada Esperança	5
21 Oct 1984
Progresso Sambizanga	0
Construtores do Uíge	3

Quarterfinals; 3–20 Nov 1984
3 Nov 1984
Nacional de Benguela	0
1º de Agosto	1
14 Nov 1984 (pen)
Petro do Huambo	7
Petro de Luanda	6
20 Nov 1984 (pen)
Desp. de Benguela	5
Desp. da Chela	4
20 Nov 1984 (Walkover)
Sagrada Esperança	3
Construtores do Uíge	0

Semifinals; 17 / 22 Nov 1984
17 Nov 1984
1º de Agosto	1
Petro do Huambo	0
22 Nov 1984
Desp de Benguela
Sagrada Esperança

Final; Wed, 28 Nov 1984
Wed, 28 Nov 1984
1º de Agosto	2
Desp de Benguela	0

== Taça de Angola (women's) ==
Season	Date	Winner	Score	Runner-up
1999	Nov 11	Progresso do Sambizanga (Luanda)	1–0	SINA (Luanda)
2000	Sep 16	Progresso do Sambizanga (Luanda)	3–0	SINA (Luanda)
2001	Nov 11	Progresso do Sambizanga (Luanda)	–
2002	Feb 4 '03	Progresso do Sambizanga (Luanda)	2–1	Masilva FC (Luanda)
2003	Dec 10	Desportivo da Expresso (Luanda)	4–1	Amigas do Mártires (Luanda)
2004	Sep 25	Progresso do Sambizanga (Luanda)	–	Amigas do Mártires (Luanda)
2005	Nov 12	Progresso do Sambizanga (Luanda)	1–0	Amigas do Mártires (Luanda)
2006	Oct 21	Amigas do Mártires (Luanda)	–	Terra Nova (Luanda)
2007	Sep 29	Progresso do Sambizanga (Luanda)	3–0	Amigas do Mártires (Luanda)
2009	Oct 24	Progresso do Sambizanga (Luanda)	1–0	Fagec FC (Luanda)
2010	Oct 30	Regedoria de Viana (Luanda)	2–1	Progresso do Sambizanga (Luanda)

== See also ==
- Supertaça de Angola
- Girabola
- Women's League
