= Campeonato Provincial de Futebol Feminino de Angola =

Football competition in Angola

- Founded: 1995
- Country: Angola
- Confederation: CAF
- Level on pyramid: 2
- Domestic cup(s): Taça de Angola; SuperTaça de Angola
- Current champions: Progresso do Sambizanga (2003)
- Most championships: Progresso do Sambizanga (4 titles)

The Angolan Women's Provincial Championships are the second tier women's clubs competition in Angola. The winning team in each province goes on to compete in the national league.

Since women's football tournaments began in 1993, over 30 clubs in Luanda became defunct due to lack of support. At present, Progresso and G.D. Fagec are among the few clubs to maintain a women's football team, even as official competition has halted.

== Luanda Provincial Championship ==
- 1995: Blocos FC
- 1996: Desportivo da Orion
- 1997: Desportivo da Expresso
- 1998: Desportivo da Expresso
- 1999: Progresso do Sambizanga
- 2000: Desportivo da Expresso
- 2001: Desportivo da Expresso
- 2002: Progresso do Sambizanga
- 2003: Progresso do Sambizanga

=== Trivia ===
- In the 2000 edition, Progresso do Sambizanga thrashed Desportivo do Kilamba Kiaxi 25-0. Guigi, a Progresso striker scored 10 goals.

== See also ==
- Taça de Angola
- Supertaça de Angola
