= Campo Mário Santiago =

Football stadium in Luanda, Angola

- Interactive map of Campo Mário Santiago
- Location: Luanda, Angola
- Coordinates: 08°48′31″S 13°16′02″E
- Owner: Progresso do Sambizanga
- Capacity: 16,000

Construction
- Renovated: 1996 (30 years ago)

Campo Mário Santiago is a football stadium in Angola owned by football club Progresso Associação do Sambizanga. Located in the club's home neighborhood of Sambizanga, the 8,000-seat stadium whose rehabilitation began in 1996 with private funding and stopped afterwards for lack of funding, resumed in 2016 under a sponsorship deal with the Fundação Eduardo dos Santos (FESA). The stadium's capacity is expected to be increased to 16,000 seats following the 18-month-long rehabilitation.

== History ==
The area were the court is located was the home ground of two football clubs that closed down in the post-independence period: Académica do Ambrizete and Benfica do Quinzau.

During the pro-communist rule that followed the country's independence in 1975, the area where the court is located was called Campo da Revolução (Revolution Camp) and was the venue of several firing-squad executions ordered by the MPLA regime in 1975, the most famous of which was the shooting of MPLA commander Virgílio Sotto Mayor under the charge of treason.

Following that ill-famed period, the field was renamed in honour of Angolan nationalist Mário Afonso Santiago (9 Sep 1942–13 Nov 1971), a local resident, ownership given to Progresso do Sambizanga and the construction work for the football stadium beginning afterwards.
