= Angolan Women's Football League =

Campeonato Nacional Sénior Feminino
- Founded: 1997
- Country: Angola
- Confederation: CAF
- Level on pyramid: 1
- Domestic cup(s): Taça de Angola; SuperTaça de Angola
- International cup: CAF W-Champions League
- Current champions: Progresso do Sambizanga (2008)
- Most championships: Petro de Luanda femenino (1 titles)
- Current: 2025-26

The Campeonato Nacional Sénior Feminino (English: National Women's Senior Championship), currently inactive, is the top tier women's clubs competition in Angola. In 1997, a national championship was organized in Lubango, Huíla for the first time and on an experimental basis. Blocos FC, a team from Luanda was the winner.

In Luanda, ever since women's football tournaments began in 1993, over 30 clubs went out of business due to lack of support. At present, Progresso is one of the few, if not the only club to maintain a women's football team, even as official competition has halted.

== History ==
The beginning of the 90's is registered as the beginning of the practice of semi-professional women's soccer in Angola, after independence.

The first experimental national championship was held in the city of Lubango, province of Huíla, in 1999, with the participation of six teams (three from Luanda and three from Huíla), ending up as National Champion by the Blocos Futebol Clube team.

The first provincial championship with an official character was held in Luanda in 1996, with the participation of 12 teams. The Grupo Desportivo da Oríon team won this edition of the unified Provincial Championship of Luanda.

The first attempt to organize women's football came in 1995, with the creation of an installation commission for women's football, which held an experimental championship in Luanda.

The following year, official competitions began in Luanda, under the tutelage of the Luanda Provincial Football Association, and later in the other provinces. In Luanda alone, there were more than thirty women's football teams. Due to the large number of teams in Luanda, for some years the competition was played with two divisions, with the first division having 22 teams and the second 23 teams.

In the absence of institutional support to the sporting groups that emerged at the time and to national companies, many teams in Luanda ended up disappearing or merged with others.

== Champions ==
=== 1997 ===
Date	City	Winner	Score	Runner-Up	Top Scorer
	Lubango	Blocos FC	2–1	Desportivo da Expresso

=== 2005 ===
Date	City	Winner	Score	Runner-Up	Top Scorer
3–10 Dec, 2005	Lubango	Progresso do Sambizanga	1–0	Amigas do Mártires	Guigui (14)

=== 2006 ===
Date	City	Winner	Score	Runner-Up	Top Scorer
11–19 Dec 2006	Huambo	Progresso do Sambizanga	3–2	G.D. Terra Nova	Mila (15)

=== 9th place match ===
Date	City	Winner	Score	Runner-Up
14–22 Dec, 2007	Luanda	Baixa de Cassange	2–0	Atrick do Bié

==== 7th place match ====
Date	City	Winner	Score	Runner-Up
14–22 Dec, 2007	Luanda	Amigas do 1º de Agosto	1–0	ASCON Lunda Norte

==== 5th place match ====
Date	City	Winner	Score	Runner-Up
14–22 Dec, 2007	Luanda	Kilambas da Huíla	0–2	Inter Un. Operativa

==== Semi-finals ====
Date	City	Winner	Score	Runner-Up
14–22 Dec, 2007	Luanda	Progresso do Sambizanga	2–0	G.D. Fagec

Date	City	Winner	Score	Runner-Up
14–22 Dec, 2007	Luanda	Amigas do Mártires	0–1	G.D. Terra Nova

==== 3rd place match ====
Date	City	Winner	Score	Runner-Up
14–22 Dec, 2007	Luanda	G.D. Fagec	3–4	Amigas do Mártires

==== Final ====
Date	City	Winner	Score	Runner-Up	Top Scorer
22 Dec, 2007	Luanda	Progresso do Sambizanga	3–0	G.D. Terra Nova	Irene (24)

=== 2008 ===
Date	City	Winner	Score	Runner-Up	Top Scorer
13–21 Dec, 2008	Luena	Progresso do Sambizanga	2–1	G.D. Fagec	Irene (49)

=== 2025 ===
Date	Local	Champions	Score	Runner-up	Top scored
9 August 2025	Luanda, Estádio dos Coqueiros	Petro de Luanda	2-0	4 de Junho do Huambo	Paulina Sambo "Pauleta" (Nacional de Benguela) (46 goals)

==== Trivia ====
- In the 2008 edition, Progresso do Sambizanga thrashed the Moxico Provincial team 30-0. Irene Gonçalves, a Progresso striker scored 22 goals.

== See also ==
- Taça de Angola
- Supertaça de Angola
