= Artur Santos (footballer) =

Portuguese footballer (1931–2025)

Personal information
- Full name: Artur Lopes dos Santos
- Date of birth: 27 March 1931
- Place of birth: Paço de Arcos, Portugal
- Date of death: 13 June 2025 (aged 94)
- Position: Defender

Senior career*
Years	Team	Apps	(Gls)
1950–1961	Benfica	284	(0)

International career
1956–1959	Portugal	2	(0)

Managerial career
- 1972–1973: Olhanense
- 1973–1974: União de Tomar
- 1976–1977: Atlético
- 1979–: Lourosa
- –1981: Alcobaça
- 1981–1982: Juventude Sport Clube
- 1982–1983: Farense
- 1984: Sagrada Esperança
- 1989: Sagrada Esperança
- * Club domestic league appearances and goals

Artur Lopes dos Santos (27 March 1931 – 13 June 2025) was a Portuguese footballer who played as defender.

Santos died on 13 June 2025, at the age of 94.

== Honours ==
Benfica

- Primeira Liga: 1954–55, 1956–57, 1959–60, 1960–61
- Taça de Portugal: 1950–51, 1951–52, 1952–53, 1954–55, 1958–59
- European Cup: 1960–61
