= Levis Swartbooi =

Namibian footballer

Personal information
- Full name: Levis Meraai Swartbooi
- Date of birth: 18 March 1984 (age 42)
- Place of birth: Walvis Bay, South Africa
- Positions: Centre forward; second striker

Senior career*
Years	Team	Apps	(Gls)
2004–2005	Blue Waters		
2006–2008	1º de Agosto		
2008–2011	Orlando Pirates		
2011–2017	African Stars		
2017–2018	Orlando Pirates		

International career
2007–2012	Namibia	9	(0)
- * Club domestic league appearances and goals

Levis Meraai Swartbooi (born 18 March 1984) is a Namibian retired footballer who played as a forward. He was a member of the Namibia national team.

== Early life ==
Swartbooi was born in Walvis Bay (then in South Africa, but part of modern-day Namibia).

== Club career ==
Swartbooi played professionally in Angola with Clube Desportivo Primeiro de Agosto.
