= F.C. Bravos do Maquis =

Association football club based in Angola

Bravos do Maquis
- Full name: Futebol Clube Bravos do Maquis
- Nickname: Os Maquisardes
- Founded: 28 July 1983; 42 years ago
- Ground: Estádio Mundunduleno, Luena, Angola
- Capacity: 4,300
- Chairman: Augusto Quitadica
- Manager: Zeca Amaral
- League: First Division
- 2024–25: 5th
Home colours	Away colours

Futebol Clube Bravos do Maquis, formerly Futebol Clube Onze Bravos and usually known simply as Bravos do Maquis, is an Angolan football club based in Luena, in the eastern province of Moxico.

== Achievements ==
- Angola Cup:

Winner: (1) 2015
Runner-up:

- Angola Super Cup:

Winner: (0)
Runner-up: (1) 2016

== Recent seasons ==
F.C. Bravos do Maquis's season-by-season performance since 2011:

Overall match statistics
Season	Pld	W	D	L	GF	GA	GD	%
2016	11	6	3	2	16	11	+5	0.636
2015	34	12	7	15	32	41	–11	0.532

Classifications
L3	L2	L1	AC	SC	CL	CC
	1b		R16	RU		
		14th	W			

Top season scorers
Player	L3	L2	L1	AC	SC	CL	CC	T
?	?	?		?				?
Chole			10	0				10

- PR = Preliminary round, 1R = First round, GS = Group stage, R32 = Round of 32, R16 = Round of 16, QF = Quarter-finals, SF = Semi-finals, RU = Runner-Up, W = Winner

== Stadium ==
They play their home games at the Estádio Jones Cufuna Mundunduleno. The 4300-seat stadium was inaugurated on 13 November 2006.

== Players and staff ==
=== Staff ===
Name	Nat	Pos
Technical staff
Zeca Amaral	(Angola)	Head coach
Almiro Lobo	(Mozambique)	Assistant coach
Medical
Rotano Chinguli	(Angola)	Physician
Alfredo Santana	(Angola)	Physio
Patrício Samuhata	(Angola)	Masseur
Lourenço Nelito	(Angola)	Masseur
Management
Augusto Quitadica	(Angola)	Chairman
Celestino Kapenda	(Angola)	Football manager

== Manager history and performance ==
Season	Coach	L2	L1	C	Coach	L2	L1	C	Coach	L2	L1	C
1997	(Angola) Kidumo Pedro											
1998	(Angola) António Piedade											
1999	(Angola) José Kilamba											
2000	(Angola) José Kilamba											
2001	(Angola) Albano César			R16	(Angola) João Pintar							
2002				R16								
2003	(Angola) João Pintar			DNP								
2004	(Angola) Carlos Alves				(Angola) Sarmento Seke			R16				
2005	(Angola) Kito Ribeiro			DNP								
2006	(Angola) Kito Ribeiro			R16								
2007	(Republic of the Congo) Jean-Marie Claude Kenzo	1st		R16								
2008	(Republic of the Congo) Jean-Marie Claude Kenzo				(Angola) João Machado		11th	R16				
2009	(Angola) João Machado		10th	R16								
2010	(Angola) João Machado				(Portugal) Augusto Portela		5th	R16				
2011	(Portugal) Augusto Portela				(Angola) João Pintar		8th	R16				
2012	(Angola) João Machado			R16	(Brazil) Rodrigo Minotti				(Angola) Zeca Amaral		7th	
2013	(Angola) Zeca Amaral		3rd	QF								
2014	(Serbia) Predrag Jokanović		6th	R16								
2015	(Portugal) Vítor Manuel				(Angola) Alberto Cardeau		14th	1st				
2016	(Angola) João Pintar	2nd		QF								
2017	(Angola) João Pintar				(Angola) Zeca Amaral		11th	SF				
2018	(Angola) Zeca Amaral		8th									
2018–19	(Angola) Zeca Amaral		10th	QF								
2019–20	(Angola) Zeca Amaral											

== See also ==
- Girabola
- Gira Angola
