= Chico Dinis =

Angolan footballer (born 1970)

Personal information
- Full name: Hermenegildo António Fernandes Dinis
- Date of birth: October 11, 1970 (age 56)
- Place of birth: Angola
- Position: Defender

Senior career*
Years	Team	Apps	(Gls)
1991–1999	Petro de Luanda		

International career
2001–2005	Angola	7	
- * Club domestic league appearances and goals

Hermenegildo António Fernandes Dinis, nicknamed Chico Dinis (born October 11, 1970) is a retired Angolan football player. He has played for Angolan side Petro de Luanda as well as for the Angolan national team.

Chico Dinis is a brother to former footballers Joaquim Dinis and Chico Dinis and basketball coach Carlos Dinis.

== National team statistics ==
Angola national team
Year	Apps	Goals
2001	8	0
2002	2	0
2003	2	0
2004	3	0
2005	1	0
Total	16	0
