= Estádio Nossa Senhora do Monte =

Sports venue in Lubango, Angola

- Interactive map of Estádio Nossa Senhora do Monte
- Address: Lubango; Angelo
- Coordinates: 14°56′11.3352″S 13°28′14.016″E
- Owner: Angola
- Operator: C.D. Huíla
- Capacity: 12,000
- Type: Multi-use
- Surface: Grass
- Current use: Association football

Construction
- Renovated: 2010

Estádio de Nossa Senhora do Monte is a multi-use stadium in Lubango, Angola.

In 2010, the stadium underwent major renovation in the framework of the 2010 Africa Cup of Nations to serve as the group D training ground.

In 2014, The state-owned stadium has been handed over to Clube Desportivo da Huila for management and tenancy purposes. The stadium holds 12,000 people.
