= Jan Brouwer =

Dutch former football manager

Personal information
- Date of birth: 24 May 1940 (age 86)
- Place of birth: Vlaardingen, Netherlands

Managerial career
- Years: Team
- 1982–1984: Willem II
- 1984–1986: Helmond Sport
- 1986–1988: Volendam
- 1996: Volendam
- 2001: Zambia
- 2004: Petro Atlético
- 2004–2007: Primeiro de Agosto
- 2008: Sagrada Esperança

Jan Brouwer (born 24 May 1940) is a Dutch former football manager who was the manager of Angolan side Sagrada Esperança, a position he undertook in April 2008.

Born in Vlaardingen, Brouwer was named manager of hometown club Fortuna Vlaardingen when only 27 years old and worked as technical manager for RBC from July 1998 until the end of 1999. He also managed Willem II and Helmond Sport, as well as Volendam.

He previously managed the Zambia national team in 2001, Petro Atlético in 2004, and Primeiro de Agosto from 2004 to 2007, who he had led to the title in 2006, their first since 1999, as well as the Cup.
