= F.C. Cabinda =

Angolan football club

FC Cabinda
- Full name: Futebol Clube de Cabinda
- Nicknames: Os Dragões do Norte (The Northern Dragons); Os Gorilas do Norte (The Northern Gorillas)
- Founded: 5 July 1955; 71 years ago
- Ground: Estadio Mbuco Mabele and Estádio Municipal do Tafe; Cabinda, Angola
- Capacity: 5,000
- Chairman: Raimundo de Almeida
- Manager: Zola Nseca
- League: Girabola
- Website: FC Cabinda
Home colours

Futebol Clube de Cabinda is a football club based in Cabinda, Angola. The club was created as an affiliate to F.C. Porto and uses the same colours.

The club has been banned by FIFA from entering any official competition until a debt with former player Luciano Câmara is settled.

== History ==
Founded in July 5, 1955, they FC Cabinda.

The first time Futebol Clube de Cabinda (FC Cabinda) competed in the Girabola was in the year 1979, the first time in the history of the championship, where it was relegated.Their first game was on December 9, 1979, a 3-0 defeat against FC Uíge, and their first victory was in January 1980 in a derby against Luta SC (2-1).It only returned in 1986 where it finished in 8th position, securing its place in the league with 26 points (until 1995, victories were worth 2 points).In its third participation, it finished in 6th place with 28 points, 10 points behind the champion Petro de Luanda.Despite playing four fewer games, the club improved and moved up one place in importance compared to last season, that year he won Mambrôa and reached the final of the 1988 Angola Angola Cup, losing to Sagrada Esperança (2-0). In 1989, with 5 fewer games played, they finished 7th, thus placing them in the middle of the table. Having avoided relegation for two seasons, the club finished in 9th and 8th place. Even after being relegated, the club finished 6th in 1992 in the 90s.The following year, the Gorillas were relegated to last place with only 14 points, but in 1995 it returned, but finished last returning in 1997 but not remaining as a guaranteed yo-yo team, they didn't secure their place and remaining in 1998 again, but one place above the relegation zone and in 1999 it finished in the middle of the table. In 2000 but also ending with a 6-0 thrashing against Petro de Luanda, finishing one point above the relegation zone and their rival Sporting de Cabinda.In the second season, being the only representative of Cabinda in the championship, they were once again the first club above the relegation zone, but 5 points behind Sambizanga's progress and it also had the second-best scorer in the championship, Adolfo, with 20 goals, only behind Flávio Amado of Petro with 23 (in a championship where the team scored 30 goals). In the third season, it fell being one place away from salvation and 2 points.

The team only returned to the Girabola eight years later in 2010, managing to stay in the league just two points above the relegation zone, but finished 12th out of 16. But they fell again, with 33 points, 2 behind Benfica de Luanda in season 2011 Girabola and then several years would pass without Girabola.

After many years without being in the second division and without a championship in the 2025-26 season, the club won the Cabinda provincial championship its first title in its history, finishing 10 points ahead of the second-placed team, then registered for the second division of 2025-26. In the Angolan Cup, they won the first phase (of Cabinda) with a 2-1 victory over Sporting de Cabinda in the final, advancing to the next phase. Before the second division, the Provincial Government of Cabinda has mobilized institutional and logistical support for FC Cabinda. with 3 consecutive wins (against Nacional de Benguela, Sporting de Luanda and Ambaca) in February, they drew and won, Estrela and Samba, but lost to the historically dormant ASA, they beat recently relegated Santa Rita do Uíge but lost to Marítimo de Benguela, ending the first round. In the Angolan Cup, he won the qualifying round but withdrew, saying he was only thinking about promotion. Back in the second division, they won 2, drew 2, but won 2, with 3 games remaining. The most difficult is the next one against ASA, which they won 1-0, then drew with Santa Rita, and on June 6th, 2026, with a full house, they face Marítimo de Benguela, it only depends on whether, but at 6 minutes the team that was last in the group scored through Capatá, but the gorillas of the Mayombe forest roared louder and at 8 and 24 minutes for Bebocho they came back, in the second half Valoi scored the third and Gideon, coming off the bench, scored the fifth and fourth goals, taking the Cabinda club to the Girabola 15 years later.

== Presidents ==
(Angola) Pascoal Vicente Paixão
(Angola) João Carvalho Mesquita
(Angola) Assunção Luís
(Angola) José Alberto Macaia
(Angola) Manuel António Rodrigues
(Angola) Faustino Lello

== Manager history ==
Season	Coach	S	L	C	Coach	S	L	C	Coach	S	L	C
1985	(Angola) Zé Luís											
1986	(Argentina) Ruben Garcia											
1987	(Argentina) Ruben Garcia											
1988	(Argentina) Ruben Garcia											
1989	(Portugal) José Miguel				(Portugal) Fernando Freitas				(Argentina) Ruben Garcia			
1991	(Angola) André Binda				(Angola) Zé Luís				(Angola) Dodú			
1993	(Brazil) João Alves				(Angola) Ma Dodé				(Argentina) Ruben Garcia			
1995	(Portugal) José Freitas											
2001	(Angola) Ernesto Castanheira											
2002	(Angola) Ernesto Castanheira				(Angola) Alberto Fernandes							
2008	(Angola) André Binda											
2009	(Brazil) Djalma Cavalcante											
2010	(Angola) André Binda				(Angola) João Machado							
2011	(Angola) João Machado				(Angola) André Binda							
2015	(Angola) Carlos Hossi Duve											
2017-2020	(Angola) André Macanga											
2020-2026	(Angola) Adilson Baptista											
2026-present	(Angola) Zola Nseca											

== Titles ==
Campeonato províncial de Cabinda (1):2025

== Honours ==
Second place Segundona 2026

== See also ==
- Girabola
- Gira Angola
