= Estádio Joaquim Morais =

Football stadium in Moçâmedes, Angola

Coordinates: 15°12′5″S 12°9′29″E

- Interactive map of Estádio Joaquim Morais
- Location: Moçâmedes, Angola
- Capacity: 3,000

Construction
- Built: 1972
- Renovated: 2012, 2019

Tenant
- Atlético Petróleos do Namibe

Estádio Joaquim Morais is a multi-use stadium in Moçâmedes, Angola. It is currently used mostly for football matches and serves as the home of Atlético Petróleos do Namibe. The stadium hosted top flight Girabola matches between 2001 and 2007. The stadium holds around 3,000 people.

The stadium, built in 1972, had its grass pitch installed on April 17th 1992.

The stadium was renovated in 2012 under the guidance of the Moçâmedes municipality and another renovation has been planned in 2019.

The stadium is adjacent to the Moçâmedes hockey venue.
