= Avelino Lopes (footballer) =

Angolan footballer

Personal information
- Date of birth: March 4, 1974 (age 52)
- Place of birth: Angola
- Position: Forward

International career
Years	Team	Apps	(Gls)
2001–2003	Angola	11	(0)

Avelino Lopes (born March 4, 1974) is an Angolan football player. He has played for Angola national team.

== National team statistics ==
Angola national team
Year	Apps	Goals
2001	8	0
2002	2	0
2003	1	0
Total	11	0
