= Zeca Amaral =

Angolan football manager

Personal information
- Full name: José Jorge Fernandes do Amaral
- Date of birth: 9 January 1967 (age 59)

Team information
- Current team: Bravos Maquis (coach)

Managerial career
- Years: Team
- 2001–2002: Sonangol Namibe
- 2005–2008: Benfica Luanda
- 2010: Angola
- 2011–2012: Rec do Libolo
- 2013: Bravos Maquis
- 2014–2016: Benfica Luanda
- 2017–: Bravos Maquis

José Jorge Fernandes do Amaral, best known as Zeca Amaral is a former manager of the Angolan national team, a job he took up in October 2010 following the resignation of Hervé Renard.

In 2017, he returned to F.C. Bravos do Maquis.
