= Estádio Mundunduleno =

Football stadium in Luena, Angola

Coordinates: 11.779928°S 19.910477°E

- Interactive map of Estádio Mundunduleno
- Location: Luena, Moxico, Angola
- Owner: F.C. Bravos do Maquis
- Capacity: 4,300

Construction
- Opened: November 13, 2006; 19 years ago
- Renovated: April 18, 2013; 13 years ago

Tenant
- Bravos do Maquis

Estádio Jones Cufune Mundunduleno is a football stadium located at the Mandengwe neighborhood in the city of Luena, Moxico Province, Angola.

It is owned by Futebol Clube Bravos do Maquis and holds 4,300 people.

== History ==
The Stadium was named after Jones Cufune Mundunduleno, a MPLA commander and guerrilla fighter from eastern Angola.

== Location ==
Mundunduleno is located at the Mandembwe neighborhood, around 2 km from the city of Luena, in an area surrounded by eucalyptus trees.

In 2013, the Stadium underwent a major renovation which forced the home team to play its home games at the neighboring Estádio das Mangueiras in the province of Lunda Sul.
