= Djalma Cavalcante =

Brazilian footballer and manager

Personal information
- Date of birth: 1957
- Place of birth: Brazil
- Date of death: 11 August 2014 (aged 57)

Managerial career
- Years: Team
- 1986: America FC (RJ)
- Mamelodi Sundowns
- Petro Atlético

Djalma Cavalcante (born 1957 in Brazil) was a Brazilian football coach.

Cavalcante died of a heart attack on August 11, 2014.

== Coaching career ==
During his coaching career, Djalma Cavalcante has managed one of the top South African clubs, Mamelodi Sundowns. He is the only Brazilian, besides Walter da Silva, who has coached at Sundowns since the era of Zola Mahobe. He has been a manager of the Angolan club Petro Atlético as well.
