= Estádio da Cidadela =

Sports venue in Luanda, Angola

Coordinates: 8°49′38.6″S 13°15′21.2″E

- Interactive map of Estádio da Cidadela
- Location: Luanda, Angola
- Owner: Angolan Government
- Capacity: 40,000

Construction
- Opened: 10 June 1972; 54 years ago
- Renovated: 10 December 1985; 40 years ago

Tenants
- ASA; Progresso do Sambizanga

Estádio da Cidadela is a stadium in Luanda, Angola. It is used mostly for football matches, while sometimes hosting cultural events, including musical concerts. It is part of the Complexo Desportivo da Cidadela, along with the Pavilhão da Cidadela, Pavilhão Anexo and Pavilhão Anexo II. While originally holding 60,000 people, in 2006, the stadium's upper ring has been declared unsafe by the CAF and banned for public use. Therefore, the capacity currently holds 40,000 spectators.

Until Angola's independence in November 1975, the stadium has been owned by Futebol Clube de Luanda, one of the most traditional and historical clubs in Luanda. Shortly after, it has been nationalised for the purpose of general government use.

The stadium is often referred to as the cathedral of Angolan sports as over the years, it has witnessed some of the most important events in Angolan sports. Among other events, it has hosted the 2nd Central African Games, for which it was re-inaugurated on December 10, 1981. The stadium is also considered to be special to the Angola national football team and especially for Angolan football hero Akwá. From 2010 however, it has been overshadowed by the newer, modern Estádio 11 de Novembro.

At present, the stadium is being used by Girabola clubs Progresso do Sambizanga and ASA as their home ground.

== Tournaments and national team matches where they were used ==
Angola games

The national team first played in the stadium in 1977 and had its last game in 2008

#	Date	Score	Opponent	Competition	Scored goal	Scored opponent
1.	26 June 1977	1–0	Cuba	Friendly	Alves	-
2.	1 June 1977	2–4	Cuba	Friendly	Alves	-
3.	18 May 1978	1–0	Cuba	Friendly	Ndunguidi	-
4.	21 May 1978	0–1	Cuba	Friendly	-	-
5.	25 November 1979	1–0	Gabon	Friendly	-	-
6.	27 November 1979	0–1	Cameroon	Friendly	-	-
7.	29 November 1979	0–1	Congo	Friendly	-	-
8.	8 November 1980	1–1	Mozambique	Friendly	Jesus	-
9.	11 November 1980	1–1	Tunisia	Friendly	-	-
10.	21 August 1981	0–0	Cameroon	1981 Central African Games	-	-
11.	23 August 1981	1–1	Gabon	1981 Central African Games	Jesus (pen.) 44'	Raouto 41'
12.	26 August 1981	1–3	Congo	1981 Central African Games	Jesus	-
13.	29 August 1981	1–1	Zaire	1981 Central African Games	Eduardo Machado 83'	Mayele Makuta 88'
14.	14 November 1982	4–0	Gabon	1984 African Cup of Nations qualifications	Eduardo Machado 45'; Joseph Maluka 55'; Vata 80'; Chico Dinis 88'	-
15.	24 March 1983	1–0	Nigeria	1984 African Cup of Nations qualifications	Ndunguidi 38'	-
16.	11 April 1987	1–0	Zaire	1988 African Cup of Nations qualification	Jesus (pen.), 19'	-
17.	7 August 1988	0–0	Sudan	1990 FIFA World Cup qualification		
18.	2 Octouber 1988	4–1	Equatorial Guinea	1990 African Cup of Nations qualification	Mendinho 43'; Barbosa 46'; Vieira Dias 54', 89'	Pedro 61'
