= Estádio Sagrada Esperança =

Football stadium in Dundo, Angola

Coordinates: 07°23′17.2428″S 20°50′0.9672″E

- Interactive map of Estádio Sagrada Esperança
- Former names: Quintalão do Dundo
- Location: Dundo, Angola
- Owner: Sagrada Esperança
- Capacity: 8,000

Construction
- Renovated: February 24, 2003; 23 years ago March 5, 2008; 18 years ago

Tenant
- Sagrada Esperança

Estádio Sagrada Esperança, formerly Quintalão do Dundo is a football stadium located at the Kamakenzo neighborhood in the city of Dundo, Angola. The stadium underwent a major rehabilitation in 2003 with the installation of a grass pitch to replace the dirt one. On March 5 2008, the stadium was further renovated. It is owned by and the home ground of Grupo Desportivo Sagrada Esperança. The stadium holds 8,000 people.

The stadium includes a gym, over 30 changing rooms, a 235-seat VIP stand, media, referee and athletes rooms and other administrative areas. Located in the Ngacumona neighborhood in Lunda Norte's capital city of Dundo, the stadium further includes a 100-car parking lot and four 12-spotlight lighting towers. A Hotel, which is also part of the stadium, has been built by Endiama in 2009.
