= Atlético Petróleos do Namibe =

Angolan football club

Atlético do Namibe
- Full name: Atlético Desportivo Petróleos do Namibe
- Founded: 24 February 1980; 45 years ago
- Ground: Estádio Joaquim Morais; Namibe, Angola
- Capacity: 5,000
- Chairman: Evaristo Kapanda
- Manager: n/a
- 2013: 15th
Home colours

Atlético Desportivo Petróleos do Namibe, formerly Onze Bravos do Sacomar and Desportivo Sonangol do Namibe and simply known as Atlético do Namibe, named after its major sponsor Sonangol, is Angolan football club based in Moçâmedes, the capital city of the Namibe Province. The name change took place in June 2005. The team play their home games at the Estádio Joaquim Morais. Its major achievements include 2 Angola cup titles won in 2001 and 2004. The club was relegated from the Angolan Premier Division, Girabola in the end of the 2007 championship.

== Achievements ==
- Angolan Cup: 2

2001, 2004

== Performance in CAF competitions ==
- CAF Confederation Cup: 1 appearance

2005 – Preliminary Round

- CAF Cup Winners' Cup: 1 appearance

2002 – First Round

== Manager history ==
(Portugal) Nina Serrano	(1994)
(Angola) Rui Teixeira	(1995)
(Angola) Agostinho Tramagal / Manata Nzuzi	(1996)
(Angola) Zeca Amaral	(Jan 2001)	-	(May 2002)
(Angola) Jaime de Sousa e Silva	(Jun 2002)	-
(Angola) Albano César	(2003)	-	(May 2004)
(Angola) Romeu Filemon	(May 2004)	-	(Nov 2005)
(Angola) António Sayombo †	(Jan 2006)	-	(Jun 2006)
(Portugal) Fernando Freitas	(Jun 2007)	-
(Angola) Ernesto Castanheira	(Mar 2011)	-	(Nov 2012)
(Angola) Paulo Saraiva	(2013)	-

== See also ==
- Girabola
- Gira Angola
