= G.D. Sagrada Esperança =

Angolan football club

Sagrada Esperança
- Full name: Grupo Desportivo Sagrada Esperança
- Nickname: Diamantíferos
- Founded: 22 December 1976; 49 years ago
- Ground: Estádio Sagrada Esperança; Dundo, Angola
- Capacity: 8,000
- Owner: Pedro Figueiredo Gustavo
- Chairman: José Muacabalo
- Manager: Rui Sapiri
- League: First Division
- 2025–26: 13th
- Website: https://gdse.ao/
Home colours	Away colours

Grupo Desportivo Sagrada Esperança, usually known as Sagrada Esperança, is an association football club from Dundo, Lunda Norte province, Angola. The club won its first title, the Angolan Cup, in 1988.

The club's name is likely to originate from Angola's first president Agostinho Neto's famous poem Sagrada Esperança (Sacred Hope). The club was founded on December 22, 1976, by then Angola-state owned diamond company Diamang (now Endiama), which remains as its major sponsor.

In 2005, the club, managed by Mário Calado, won the league by having one point ahead ASA. In the same year, the club competed in the 2005 CAF Champions League, but was eliminated in the first round by ASEC Abidjan of Ivory Coast, after a 2–2 draw at home in the first leg and a 1–0 defeat away in the second leg.

== Achievements ==
- Angola League
  - Champions (2): 2005, 2021.
- Angola Cup
  - Winners (2): 1988, 1999.
- Angolan SuperCup
  - Winners (1): 2021.

Endiama logo

== Recent seasons ==
Sagrada Esperança's season-by-season performance since 2011:

Overall match statistics
Season	Pld	W	D	L	GF	GA	GD	%
2016	40	15	11	14	36	34	+2	0.550
2015	35	13	10	12	24	31	–7	0.543

Classifications
LG	AC	SC	CL	CC
9th	QF			
10th	2nd			

Top season scorers
Player	LG	AC	SC	CL	CC	T
Love	4	2			5	11
Guedes	4	?				4

- PR = Preliminary round, 1R = First round, GS = Group stage, R32 = Round of 32, R16 = Round of 16, QF = Quarter-finals, SF = Semi-finals

== Performance in CAF competitions ==
- CAF Champions League: 3 appearances

2005 – First Round
2006 – Preliminary Round
2022 -

- CAF Cup: 2 appearances

1992 – Second Round
1998 – First Round

- CAF Cup Winners' Cup: 2 appearances

1989 – Second Round
2000 – Second Round

== Stadium ==
The club plays their home matches at formerly Quintalão do Dundo, now Estádio Sagrada Esperança, which has a maximum capacity of 8,000 people. The stadium underwent a major rehabilitation and was renamed and reinaugurated in 2008.

== Players and staff ==
=== Squad ===
As of 26 January 2024

Note: Flags indicate national team as defined under FIFA eligibility rules; some limited exceptions apply. Players may hold more than one non-FIFA nationality.

No.	Pos.	Nation	Player
1	GK	ANG	Landu Langanga
2	DF	ANG	Alexandre Fernando
3	DF	ANG	Mukendi Reginó
4	DF	ANG	Fabrício Mafuta
8	MF	ANG	Celso
10	MF	CIV	Aly Savane
12	GK	ANG	Gerson
13	GK	ANG	Leonardo
14	DF	ANG	Mateus Gaspar
15	FW	NGA	Femi Joseph
16	MF	ANG	Lépua
17	DF	ANG	Muenho
18	MF	ANG	Milton Suca

No.	Pos.	Nation	Player
19	MF	ANG	Beni Fua
20	DF	ANG	Luís Taty
21	FW	ANG	Cachí
22	MF	POR	Emanuel Cruz
23	DF	ANG	Victoriano
24	FW	ANG	Hermenegildo Valente
25	DF	ANG	Lulas
26	MF	ANG	Água Doce
28	MF	SEN	Mamadou Sadio
30	GK	COD	Nathan Mabruki
32	MF	ANG	Jefer Gunjo
33	FW	ANG	Deco
36	MF	ANG	Messias Neves

=== Staff ===
Name	Nat	Pos
Technical staff
Roque Sapiri	(Angola)	Head coach
Rui Oliveira	(Brazil)	Assistant coach
	(Angola)	Goalkeeper coach
Management
José Muacabalo	(Angola)	Chairman
José Pontes Ramos	(Angola)	Vice-chairman
Jojó Garcia	(Angola)	Head of Foot Dept

== Manager history and performance ==
Season	Coach	S	L	C	Coach	S	L	C	Coach	S	L	C
1982	(Portugal) José Henrique				(Angola) Alferes Carvalho							
1984	(Portugal) Artur Santos											
1985	(Portugal) Artur Santos											
1987	(Angola) Job Cipriano				(Angola) Adé							
1988	(Angola) Laurindo				(Angola) Adé			1988 Angola Cup				
1989	(Portugal) Artur Santos				(Angola) Adé							
1990	(Angola) João Machado											
1991	(Angola) João Machado											
1992	(Angola) João Machado				(Angola) Adé							
1993	(Serbia) Molosević											
1994	(Angola) Joka Santinho											
1995	(Angola) Napoleão Brandão											
1996	(Angola) Rui Teixeira											
1997	(Angola) João Machado											
1998	(Portugal) Nina Serrano				(Angola) José Luís Borges		6th					
1999	(Angola) João Machado			1999 Angola Cup								
2000	(Angola) João Machado											
2001	(Angola) João Machado											
2002	(Angola) Carlos Alves				(Angola) Agostinho Tramagal							
2003	(Angola) Mário Calado											
2004	(Angola) Mário Calado											
2005	(Angola) Mário Calado		2005 Girabola									
2006	(Angola) Mário Calado				(Angola) Frank Moniz							

Season	Coach	S	L	C	Coach	S	L	C	Coach	S	L	C
2007	(Angola) Albano César				(Angola) Frank Moniz							
2008	(Angola) Frank Moniz				(Netherlands) Jan Brouwer		12th	SF				
2009	(Angola) Napoleão Brandão	1st		RU								
2010	(Angola) Napoleão Brandão				(Angola) Frank Moniz		11th	SF				
2011	(Angola) Mário Calado		7th	R16								
2012	(Angola) Mário Calado		11th	SF								
2013	(Portugal) António Caldas		5th	R16								
2014	(Portugal) António Caldas		8th	R16								
2015	(Portugal) António Caldas				(Angola) Frank Moniz				(Serbia) Zoran Manojlović		10th	RU
2016	(Serbia) Zoran Manojlović				(Angola) Roque Sapiri			QF	(Turkey) Ekrem Asma		9th	
2017	(Turkey) Ekrem Asma		3rd	R16								
2018	(Turkey) Ekrem Asma				(Angola) Roque Sapiri							
2018–19	(Angola) Agostinho Tramagal											
2019–20	(Portugal) Paulo Torres				(Angola) Roque Sapiri							
2020–21	(Angola) Roque Sapiri											
2021–22	(Angola) Roque Sapiri	2021–22 Angola Super Cup	2021–22 Girabola									
2022–23	(Portugal) Alexandre Ribeiro				(Angola) Frank Moniz							
2023–24	(Angola) Roque Sapiri											

== See also ==
- Girabola
- Gira Angola
