= Progresso Associação do Sambizanga =

Progresso do Sambizanga
- Full name: Progresso Associação do Sambizanga
- Founded: 17 November 1975; 50 years ago
- Ground: Estádio da Cidadela; Luanda, Angola
- Capacity: 40,000
- Chairman: Inácio António Alfredo
- Manager: Hélder Teixeira
- League: Segundona
- 2021–22: ▼15th in Girabola (relegated)
- Website: www.progressosambizanga.com
Home colours	Away colours

Progresso Associação do Sambizanga is an Angolan football club based in Luanda. The club was founded in 1975, as a result of a merger of three clubs: Juventude Unida do Bairro Alfredo, Juventista and Vaza.

Progresso do Sambizanga is notably the only club in Girabola to maintain a women's soccer team, even without official competition. They play their home games at the state-owned Estádio da Cidadela.

== History ==
The club made its debut in the Girabola in 1981 and won their only cup title in 1996 after defeating Primeiro de Agosto and qualified into the 1997 CAF Winners' Cup where they challenged with Gabon's FC 105 Libreville and won a goal in the first leg and lost 2–0 in the last, this was their only appearance in the continental competition.

In the 1980s, the club expanded its international relations, Progresso Sambizanga was the first African club to play in the legendary Maracanã in Rio de Janeiro.

One of the friendly pre-season matches were in 2012 where they played in Brazil in the Toca de Raposa I with the two popular clubs Cruzeiro and Atlético Mineiro.

Progresso do Sambizanga was the first African team to play in the Estádio do Maracaña. That occurred in the 1990s at the time when the team was on campus in a 1-2 loss to a team of retired Brazilian footballers.

First lineup in Girabola

== Honours ==
- Angola Cup: 1
  - 1996

Runner-up: (1) 2016

== Recent seasons ==
Progresso do Sambizanga's season-by-season performance since 2011:

Overall match statistics
Season	Pld	W	D	L	GF	GA	GD	%
2016	34	11	15	8	29	28	+1	0.441
2015	32	10	8	14	38	40	–2	0.531

Classifications
LG	AC	SC	CL	CC
8th	2nd			
12th	QF			

Top season scorers
Player	LG	AC	SC	CL	CC	T
Yano	8	2				10
Yano	13	0				13

- PR = Preliminary round, 1R = First round, GS = Group stage, R32 = Round of 32, R16 = Round of 16, QF = Quarter-finals, SF = Semi-finals

== Stadium ==
Progresso do Sambizanga is the owner of Campo Mário Santiago. Located in the club's home neighborhood of Sambizanga, the 8,000-seat stadium whose rehabilitation began in 1996 with private funding and stopped afterwards for lack of funding, resumed in 2016 under a sponsorship deal with the Fundação Eduardo dos Santos (FESA). The stadium's capacity is expected to be increased to 18,000 seats, following the 18-month-long rehabilitation.

== Uniform and home kit evolution ==
Its uniform color has a yellow-black striped clothing with black sleeves and socks and black-yellow striped socks used for home games. Its former uniform was a yellow-black striped shirt with yellow stripe on each side and had striped sleeves and black shorts.

Home uniform up in the 2007 season
Home uniform up to the 2014 season

== Performance in CAF competitions ==
- CAF Cup Winners' Cup: 1 appearance

1997 – First Round

(Gabon) FC 105 Libreville 1–0, 2–0

== Players and staff ==
=== Staff ===
Name	Nat	Pos
Technical staff
Paulo Dias	(Angola)	Head coach
Diogo Pedro	(Angola)	Assistant coach
Mbala José	(Angola)	Goalkeeper coach
Medical
Valdevino Miranda	(Angola)	Physician
Rui Oliveira	(Brazil)	Physio
Management
Inácio António Alfredo	(Angola)	Chairman
Manuel Santos	(Angola)	Vice-Chairman

== Manager history and performance ==
Season	Coach	L2	L1	C	Coach	L2	L1	C
1981	(Angola) Eduardo Laurindo da Silva							
1982	(Angola) Augusto Pedro				(Argentina) Eduardo Gonzalez			
1983	(Argentina) Eduardo Gonzalez				(Angola) Domingos Inguila			
1984	(Angola) Domingos Inguila							
1987	(Angola) Carlos Alves							
1989	(Angola) Carlos Romão							
1992	(Angola) Napoleão Brandão							
1993	(Angola) Arlindo Leitão							
1994	(Angola) Arlindo Leitão				(Angola) António Piedade			
1995	(Angola) Luzolo Garcia				(Angola) Joaquim Dinis			
1996	(Angola) Joaquim Dinis			1996 Angola Cup				
1997	(Angola) Joaquim Dinis							
1998	(Angola) João Machado							
2001	(Angola) Salviano Magalhães				(Angola) Napoleão Brandão			
2002	(Angola) Napoleão Brandão							
2003	(Angola) Napoleão Brandão				(Peru) Arnaldo Gamonal			
2004	(Portugal) José Alberto Torres				(Angola) João Imanga Janguelito			
2005	(Portugal) José Ferraz							

Season	Coach	L2	L1	C	Coach	L2	L1	C
2006	(Brazil) Luís Mariano							
2007	(Angola) João Machado							
2008	(Angola) João Machado				(Angola) Ernesto Castanheira			
2009	(Angola) Ndunguidi Daniel				(Angola) João Imanga Janguelito			
2010	(Serbia) Drasko Stojiljković							
2011	(Serbia) Drasko Stojiljković				(Netherlands) Jan Brouwer			
2012	(Angola) David Dias							
2013	(Angola) David Dias							
2014	(Cape Verde) Lúcio Antunes							
2015	(Angola) Mário Calado				(Angola) Albano César			
2016	(Angola) Albano César							
2017	(Angola) Kito Ribeiro		7th	SF				
2018	(Angola) Hélder Teixeira		13th					
2018-19	(Angola) Hélder Teixeira				(Angola) Guilherme Sousa			
2019-20	(Angola) Kito Ribeiro				(Angola) Hélder Teixeira			
2020-21	(Angola) Paulo Dias							

== Progresso do Sambizanga Women's Football ==
When it comes to women's football in Angola, Progresso do Sambizanga is undeniably a benchmark and a force to reckon with. Until the mid 2000s when regular competitions were organized, the club has won most titles in contest. While no regular competition are being played at present both at provincial and national level, the club still maintains its women's team with regular practice.

=== Achievements ===
- Angola League: 4

2005, 2006, 2007, 2008

- Angolan Cup: 6

2000, 2001, 2002, 2003, 2004, 2005

- Super Cup: 1

2000

== Other sports ==
- Handball
- Basketball

== See also ==
- Girabola
- Women's League
- Gira Angola
