= List of Académica Petróleos do Lobito players =

This article is about the list of Académica Petróleos do Lobito players. Académica Petróleos do Lobito is an Angolan football (soccer) club based in Lobito, Angola and plays at Estádio do Buraco. The club was established in 1970.

== 2020–2021 ==
Académica Petróleos do Lobito players 2020–2021

Nat	#	Nick	Name	A	P	A. da Silva			Total Apps & Gls					
Nat	#	Nick	Name	A	P	2020–21			Total Apps & Gls					
Nat	#	Nick	Name	A	P	^{#}	^{A}	^{G}	^{S}	^{A}	^{G}			
Nat	#	Nick	Name	A	P	(Angola)	27	Adó	António Joaquim Barros Pena	25	MF	27	^{25}	^{5}
(Angola)	6	Ady	Angelino Sukuacuechi	21	DF	36	^{6(1)}	^{3}						
(Angola)	26	Além	Alexandre Muenha	25	MF	26	^{(1)}	^{0}						
(Angola)	16	Amândio	Amândio António A. Madienguluca	24	FW	16	^{2(2)}	^{0}						
(Angola)	34	Amor	Moisés Pedro Amor			16	^{(1)}	^{0}						
(Angola)	3	Ariclene	Ariclene Assunção Oliveira	29	DF	3	^{10(1)}	^{0}						
(Angola)	1	Badrick	Paulo Madadi Badrick	40	GK	1	^{19}	^{0}						
(Angola)	26	Bebucho				26	^{1(2)}	^{0}						
(Angola)	33	Bruno	Domingos Lunga M. Manuel	27	MF	33	^{2(1)}	^{0}						
(Angola)	40	Cadodó	António da Silva C. Hossi		DF	40	^{13(1)}	^{0}						
(Angola)	24	Caprego	Filipe Kandimba	20	DF	24	^{5(2)}	^{0}						
(Angola)	8	Cláudio Cruz	Sílvio Dongati Cláudio da Cruz	25	DF	8	^{8(5)}	^{2}						
(Angola)	10	Cláudio Sozinho	Cláudio Américo Loi Sozinho	26	MF	10	^{21(2)}	^{0}						
(Angola)	15	Dias	Dias Mpembele	25	MF	15	^{16}	^{0}						
(Angola)	17	Didí				17	^{(3)}	^{0}						
(Angola)	38	Eliseu Bicho	Eliseu António Bicho Varela		MF	38	^{17(3)}	^{0}						
(Angola)	2	Eliseu Cabanga	Eliseu Lucas C. Cabanga	24	DF	2	^{14(1)}	^{0}						
(Angola)	32	Ernesto	Ernesto Ulungu			38	^{(2)}	^{0}						
(Angola)	12	Fani	José Afonso dos Santos Fernando	30	GK	12	^{4}	^{0}						
(Angola)	5	Feião	Moisés Sebastião Cabungula	30	MF	5	^{(3)}	^{0}						
(Angola)	21	Gadinho	Manuel Wacuti	22	FW	21	^{(1)}	^{0}						
(Angola)	33	Gaio Tomás	Tomás Neves Gaio		FW	33	^{1(5)}	^{1}						
(Angola)	25	Gaúcho	Júlio Chissolongamba Baptista	23	MF	25	^{2}	^{0}						
(Angola)	28	Gelson Hossi	Gerónimo Hossi			28	^{(1)}	^{0}						
(Angola)	5	Geovane	Geovane L. Pedro Vaz	25	MF	5	^{2(6)}	^{0}						
(Angola)	19	Germano	Germano Camuege Luís	33	MF	19	^{9(7)}	^{1}						
(Angola)	9	Guelor	Anderson Benjamim	32	DF	9	^{4(3)}	^{0}						
(Democratic Republic of the Congo)	11	Jiresse	Mawiya Tutona Jiresse	29	FW	11	^{18(4)}	^{3}						
(Angola)	17	Joca	Osvaldo Jacob Chitumba Palana	33	FW	17	^{3(4)}	^{0}						
(Angola)	18	Kalú	José Sesoko da Silva Calei	23	MF	18	^{1(2)}	^{0}						
(Angola)	4	Líbero	Quintino Feliciano Pereira	31	DF	4	^{20}	^{0}						
(Angola)	22	Lima	Eric de Paula Lima	31	MF	4	^{5(5)}	^{1}						
(Angola)	18	Makusa	Makusa Nzembe Lemi José	28	FW	18	^{9(4)}	^{4}						
(Angola)	6	Mano Mano	Constantino Carlos António	22	MF	6	^{7(1)}	^{1}						
(Angola)	7	Márcio	Márcio Armando Gonçalves Luvambo	35	MF	7	^{16(4)}	^{1}						
(Angola)	14	Nelito	Manuel Chanda Cachimalim	30	DF	14	^{19(3)}	^{0}						
(Angola)	37	Nilton	Valentino T. Manuel	30	DF	37	^{7(1)}	^{0}						
(Angola)	23	Noé	Noé dos Santos Selano			23	^{1(3)}	^{0}						
(Angola)	13	Platini	Elídio Wanga Paulino	21	DF	13	^{7}	^{0}						
(Angola)	30	Tití	Luís Vicente Arão	32	GK	30	^{7(1)}	^{0}						
(Angola)	20	Valdez	Hugo Anderson de Almeida Valdez Lourenço	30	DF	20	^{2(2)}	^{0}						
(Angola)	16	Vasco	Vasco Augusto Inácio	25	DF	16	^{8(1)}	^{0}						
(Angola)	31	Vladimir	António Adilson Quintas	23	MF	31	^{(2)}	^{1}						
(Angola)	29	Zebedeu	Zebedeu Jordão Sacata Morais	32	DF	29	^{20(1)}	^{0}						
Years						2020–21								

== 2011–2020 ==
Académica Petróleos do Lobito players 2011–2020

Nat	Nick	Name	A	P	C.C.	S.P.	A.T.	E. Asma		A.L.	Rui Garcia						J.Paulino			A. da Silva			Total Apps & Gls			
Nat	Nick	Name	A	P	2011	2012	2013	2014	2015	2016	2017 (13th)			2018 (5th)			2018–19 (12th)			2019-20			Total Apps & Gls			
Nat	Nick	Name	A	P	16	4	2	1	13	12	^{#}	^{A}	^{G}	^{#}	^{A}	^{G}	^{#}	^{A}	^{G}	^{#}	^{A}	^{G}	^{S}	^{A}	^{G}	
Nat	Nick	Name	A	P	(Angola)	Abelão			MF				24													
(Angola)	Adó Pena	António Joaquim Barros Pena	–	MF						26	27	^{9(2)}	^{2}				→			13	^{5(2)}	^{2}	↑			
(Angola)	Adolfo	Miantima João		DF				6	30																	
(Angola)	Aires	Ludgero Aires Cachicote da Rocha	27	MF						–	→															
(Angola)	Ali		28	GK																27	^{3(3)}	^{1}				
(Angola)	Anastácio	Anastácio Manuel da Costa	33	MF						→	26	^{1}	^{0}													
(Angola)	Ayala	Mário Álvaro Agostinho	31	MF										→			5	^{26(2)}	^{2}	→						
(Angola)	Badrick	Paulo Madadi Badrick	–	GK													→			30	^{3}	^{0}	↑			
(Angola)	Bartolo		25	DF						→	2	^{2(1)}	^{0}	→												
(Angola)	Bartolo Baptista	Bartolomeu Nguia Baptista	22	MF						→	14	^{(1)}	^{0}													
(Angola)	Bebo Costa	Manuel João Miguel da Costa	19	MF							→			25	^{4(2)}	^{0}										
(Angola)	Belito Socola	Abelardo Gomes Socola	23	MF										→			10	^{22(5)}	^{1}	→						
(Senegal)	Ben Traoré	Naman Traoré	29	FW							9	^{12}	^{3}	→												
(Angola)	Benguela	António Cajambala Manuel		DF	21																					
(Angola)	Boka	Boka Nelson Filho	31	DF							→			3	^{2(2)}	^{0}										
(Democratic Republic of the Congo)	Bombasa	Bombasa Victor	32	GK						→	12	^{9}	^{0}	→												
(Angola)	Borges, Cláudio	Cláudio Ricardo Cunha Borges	34	DF					→	2	4	^{9(1)}	^{0}													
(Portugal)	Bruno Lúcio	Bruno Miguel Tomás Lúcio	34	GK							24	^{6}	^{1}													
(Angola)	Bruno Manuel	Domingos Linga M. Manuel	–	MF							14	^{8(2)}	^{1}	17	^{1(5)}	^{0}							↑			
(Angola)	Bug Jass	Simão da Costa Bartolomeu	24	MF				→	5	→																
(Angola)	Bumba	Pedro António da Costa	31	MF							16	^{2(6)}	^{1}													
(Angola)	Cabibi Abreu	Mário Rui de Abreu	25	MF					→	29																
(Angola)	Cachi	Januário da Cruz Sesa		MF	–			7	7																	
(Angola)	Calei	Eugénio Sambambi		DF	2																					
(Guinea-Bissau)	Camara	Hamidou Camara		GK	–																					
(Angola)	Camota	Júlio Camota Marcelino Tito	21	MF						22	22	^{3(1)}	^{0}	→												
(Angola)	Capita	Evanildo de Jesus Pedro	29	FW										10	^{5(1)}	^{1}	→									
(Angola)	Carlitos Victor	João Pedro Victor	28	GK																1	^{1}	^{0}				
(Democratic Republic of the Congo)	Carlos	Carlos Nzuzi Fuila	29	DF						→	20	^{5(3)}	^{0}	→												
(Angola)	Cebola Domingos	Pedro Cambengue C. Domingos									26	^{(2)}	^{1}	→			25	^{1(6)}	^{1}	→						
(Angola)	Chabalala	Gaspar Necas Fortunato	20	FW					→	17	–			2	^{6(1)}	^{0}	31	^{15(3)}	^{1}							
(Angola)	Chiló Orlando	Francisco Ananias Orlando	28	MF					→	7	27	^{5(3)}	^{2}	27	^{11(1)}	^{3}										
(Senegal)	Cisse	Ibrahima Sory Cisse	28	FW				→	18																	
(Angola)	Cláudio Cruz	Sílvio Dongati Cláudio da Cruz	–	DF							→			26	^{(1)}	^{0}	8	^{16(1)}	^{0}	8	^{21}	^{0}	↑			
(Angola)	Cláudio Sozinho	Cláudio Américo Loi Sozinho	–	MF				23	8	8	8	^{19(2)}	^{0}	8	^{6(2)}	^{1}	23	^{7(2)}	^{1}	10	^{8(1)}	^{0}	↑			
(Angola)	Cleusio	Cléusio Evaristo	22	GK													30	^{DNP}		12	^{DNP}					
(Angola)	Clóvice			MF				→	19																	
(Angola)	Cristiano Quitembo	Cristiano Bernardo Quitembo	31	DF	3	–	3							→			3	^{12(1)}	^{3}							
(Angola)	Dadão Bile	Adão Francisco Congo Zalata		MF				25																		
(Angola)	Dadão Pedro	Manuel Nzagi Pedro		GK													1	^{8}	^{0}	→						
(Angola)	Dani			FW				21	21																	
(Germany)	Daniel Ujazdowski	Daniel Ujazdowski	24						16																	
(Angola)	Day Day	Zaldivar Doval Augusto Cambinda	25	MF					→	–	→															
(Angola)	Deco Calepi	Moisés Alberto Calepi		FW				→	–											31	^{DNP}					→
(Angola)	Depaiza	Estevão Manuel Quitocota Cahoco	29	DF													→			21	^{11(6)}	^{2}				→
(Angola)	Depú	Laurindo Dilson Maria Aurélio	20	FW																35	^{5(9)}	^{1}				→
(Angola)	Diogo						27	27	17																	
(Angola)	Djo	Martins Geovety Panzo Gervásio		DF			19	19		19																
(Angola)	Dodó Gombiwa	Adelino Gombiwa		MF	–																					
(Angola)	Dory	Dorivaldo Francisco da Costa		FW	20																					
(Angola)	Dungula	Jorge Kahete Dungula	28	DF													→			3	^{3(1)}	^{0}				
(Angola)	Edmilson	Edmilson Manuel da Conceição Gomes		FW	–																					
(Angola)	Edú Pessela	António Lucamba Pessela	24	MF										→			27	^{8(5)}	^{0}	27						→
(Angola)	Efemberg	José Manuel Catendi		MF				15	15		→															
(Angola)	Elizur			MF			–																			
(Angola)	Elton	Elton Ernesto de Carvalho								27																
(Bulgaria)	Emil	Emil Rachev	24					16	→																	
(Angola)	Esmael	Esmael João Lucas		FW			–																			
(Angola)	Estória	Sérgio António Luís	28	DF							→			15	^{12}	^{0}	→									
(Angola)	Fani	José Afonso dos Santos Fernando	28	GK			→	1	1	1	–	^{DNP}		12	^{DNP}		12	^{12}	^{0}	→						
(Angola)	Faustino Gonçalves	Faustino Jorge Gonçalves	24	DF										→			15	^{9}	^{0}							
(Angola)	Feliciano Tchissapa	Feliciano Domingos Tchissapa		GK	1	→	–																			
(Nigeria)	Femi	Joseph Femi Olatubosun	26	FW					→	11	→															
(Angola)	Filipe Tchitungo	Filipe Tomás João Tchitungo	22	MF			–	–		27	28	^{9}	^{0}	28	^{13(5)}	^{1}	28	^{21}	^{0}	→						
(Angola)	G.T.I.	Daniel António Jonata	21	MF							30	^{9(5)}	^{0}	14	^{1(1)}	^{0}	→									
(Angola)	Gância	Domingos Zaya Nunes		GK					→	24																
(Angola)	Gaúcho	Júlio Chissolongamba Baptista	–	MF										–			34	^{2(11)}	^{0}	25	^{1(2)}	^{0}	↑			
(Angola)	Gêneses			DF	–																					
(Angola)	Geovane Vaz	Geovane L. Pedro Vaz	–	MF													→			5	^{(5)}	^{1}	↑			
(Angola)	Germano Diogo	Germano Cagiza Diogo	–	DF	–															19	^{6(2)}	^{2}	↑			
(Angola)	Germano Luís	Germano Camuege Luís	30	MF						→	19	^{11(3)}	^{7}	19	^{15(6)}	^{1}	→									
(Angola)	Gerry	Nsingui Tino João	31	MF													15	^{14}	^{0}	15	^{18}	^{0}				→
(Angola)	Gerson																			33	^{DNP}					
(Angola)	Gomito Cassule	António Gonçalo Cassule	34	MF						→	4	^{2}	^{0}	→												
(Angola)	Guebuza			DF							2	^{8(1)}	^{0}	→												
(Angola)	Guelor	Anderson Benjamim	30	FW													11	^{14}	^{2}	→						
(Angola)	Gui Matos	Manuel Porfírio Pompílio de Matos	26	MF										→			13	^{20(1)}	^{0}	→						
(Angola)	Guy	Carlos Alberto da Silva Luciano	35		–																					
(Angola)	Hélder			DF			–																			
(Angola)	Henrique Caculula	Henrique Caculula	19	DF	–																					
(Angola)	Higino Julião	Ezequiel Paulo Julião	22	MF			20	20	10	10	→															
(Angola)	Hossi	João Hossi da Costa Alberto	20														32	^{(5)}	^{0}	32	^{1(7)}	^{0}				
(Bulgaria)	Hristo	Hristo Lemperov	26					9																		
(Guinea-Bissau)	Ibraime	Ibraime Barreto Cassamá	31	MF					→	5	5	^{5}	^{0}													
(Poland)	Jacek	Jacek Magdziński	29	FW				→	11	→																
(Angola)	Jailov			GK			–																			
(Angola)	Jair	Jair Sebastião de Castro	27	DF						→	15	^{(2)}	^{1}													
(Angola)	Jerónimo Mboma	Paulo Júnior Mboma		MF	–	→																				
(Democratic Republic of the Congo)	Jiresse	Mawiya Tutona Jiresse	26	FW						→	11	^{22}	^{8}	11	^{24}	^{2}	→									
(Angola)	João Fernandes	João Nunes Fernandes	30	FW	–																					
(Angola)	João Vala	João José Delgado Vala	31	DF					6																	
(Angola)	Johnson	Joel Sebastião Adão Pascoal	25	DF							→			4	^{11(2)}	^{0}										
(Angola)	Joca Palana	Osvaldo Jacob Chitumba Palana	–	FW					27	→	→			20	^{6(6)}	^{1}	11	^{3(4)}	^{0}					↑		
(Angola)	Jordão			MF			8	8																		
(Cape Verde)	Kadú	Jorge Paulo Lima Alves	27	FW					21	21	10	^{2(5)}	^{6}	10	^{3(5)}	^{2}										
(Angola)	Kalunga		24	MF							21	^{12}	^{0}	21	^{2(5)}	^{0}	21	^{1}	^{0}							
(Angola)	Kambi	Lutumba Kambi	22	MF							→			6	^{9(2)}	^{0}	6	^{17(2)}	^{0}	6	^{6(4)}	^{1}				→
(Angola)	Kituxi	Diocleciano Dário de Carvalho Santana		GK				30																		
(Angola)	Landinho	Miguel Simão Ndombe		GK				→	–																	
(Angola)	Lelas	Adérito Yandelela Chissoca	29	FW							→			9	^{16(4)}	^{2}										
(Angola)	Líbero	Quintino Feliciano Pereira	–	DF			–	4	4	4	→			→			4	^{18}	^{0}	4	^{13(1)}	^{0}	↑			
(Angola)	Lindala	Armando Domingos Maria		MF										25	^{8(5)}	^{0}	→			16	^{18(2)}	^{2}				→
(Angola)	Lito Kapunge	Evaristo Daniel Kapunge	–	DF				3	9	18	18	^{16(1)}	^{0}	→			18	^{24(1)}	^{0}	18	^{22}	^{0}	↑			
(Angola)	Loló Cassule	Jorge Miguel Gonçalves Cassule	28	DF							→			13	^{12}	^{0}										
(Angola)	Lourenço Adriano	Lourenço Cambiombo Sapalo Adriano	26	MF				22	22	16	16	^{12}	^{0}	5	^{26(1)}	^{1}	→									
(Angola)	Malone	Narciso Jorge Bilanda		MF	26		26	26	26																	
(Angola)	Maninho						–	–	28																	
(Angola)	Mano Mano António	Constantino Carlos António	21	MF													→			23	^{17(1)}	^{2}				→
(Brazil)	Marcão	Marcos Henrique da Silva Bonfim	27	MF					→	–	→															
(Angola)	Márcio	Márcio Armando Gonçalves Luvambo	–	MF										→			7	^{29(1)}	^{5}	7	^{22(1)}	^{3}	↑			
(Angola)	Marcos	Marcos Luís Bumba		FW	–																					
(Portugal)	Marinho	Mário Jorge Ferreira da Silva	32	DF				→	6																	
(Angola)	Marito Mendonça	Clemente Martins Mendonça		GK	–																					
(Angola)	Martins			MF	8																					
(Angola)	Mendinho Tavares	Walter Moura Mendes Tavares	29	MF							→			17	^{(3)}	^{0}										
(Angola)	Micha			GK				12	29																	
(Angola)	Mig	Zacarias dos Milagres Sambambi	24	GK							24	^{7}	^{0}	→												
(Portugal)	Miguel Caramalho	Miguel Guerra Caramalho	26	FW							5	^{(1)}	^{0}	16	^{2(3)}	^{0}										
(Angola)	Milambo Mendes	Ndanda Ricardo Mendes	23	DF							7	^{7(4)}	^{1}	18	^{19}	^{0}	→									
(Angola)	Mingo Pambo	Domingos Pambo	22	DF	–																					
(Angola)	Moco	Constantino Félix		MF	–																					
(Angola)	Mona			MF				29																		
(Angola)	Nandinho Morais	Fernando Manuel Morais	24	DF													2	^{3(1)}	^{0}	→						
(Angola)	Nando Mundele	Nguizani Pedro Sebastião Mundele		DF				→	–																	
(Angola)	Nani	Sebastião Quionga Luvualo	27	DF						15	→															
(Angola)	Ndulo Simão	Cristóvão Segunda Palanga Simão	22	GK					→	30	1	^{3(1)}	^{0}	1	^{28}	^{0}	→									
(Angola)	Nelito Cachimalim	Manuel Chanda Cachimalim	–	MF	–			14	14	14	→												↑			
(Angola)	Nelo Costa	Manuel Mendes da Costa		DF	–																					
(Angola)	Nelson			MF			–																			
(Angola)	Nicho	Bento Gonçalves Chitunga		MF	–																					
(Angola)	Nilton Chacussanga	José Manuel Carvalho Chacussanga		DF	–	→																				
(Angola)	Noé	Noé dos Santos Selano	–																	17	^{(1)}	^{0}	↑			
(Angola)	Nsesani	Nsesani Emanuel Simão	20	GK																34	^{22}	^{0}				→
(Angola)	Nzuzi João		31	DF			→	28	25	25	25	^{DNP}		→			29	^{4(1)}	^{0}							
(Angola)	Odilon	Ngonda Ndilu Odilon João	24	FW																9	^{23(1)}	^{7}				→
(Angola)	Oliveira Gonga	Pedro José de Oliveira Gonga	27	DF				→	23	→																
(Angola)	Osório	Osório Carvalho	36	MF					→	6	6	^{9(1)}	^{0}	→												
(Angola)	Paulo			GK																30	^{DNP}					
(Angola)	Pedy	Benedito C. Dumbo		FW										→			14	^{2(5)}	^{2}							
(Angola)	Pena																									
(Angola)	Pick Chivanga	Fernando Katito Chivanga	32	DF							→			24	^{DNP}											
(Angola)	Pirolito	Ilídio José Panzo	27	MF													→			28	^{5(1)}	^{1}				→
(Angola)	Poco	Manuel Paulo Víctor	27	DF			13	13	13	13	13	^{14(1)}	^{0}	→												
(Angola)	Prince	Ntoya Matondo Paulo	22	GK							→			30	^{DNP}		→									
(Angola)	Pringuingui										15	^{DNP}		→												
(Angola)	Projecto	Jaime Cotingo Martinho	29	DF							23	^{9}	^{0}	23	^{16}	^{0}	23	^{5}	^{0}							
(Angola)	Quinho	Samuel Kuyokoya Francisco	20	FW										→			35	^{5(6)}	^{2}	→						
(Angola)	Ruben Gouveia	Rúben Sílvio Lino Gouveia	32	MF					→	23	23	^{3(2)}	^{1}													
(Angola)	Rui Maurício	Rui Carlos Tavares Maurício	26	MF						–	→															
(Angola)	Rui Miguel	Jorge Honésimo Miguel	23	GK										→			1	^{11}	^{0}							
(Bulgaria)	Rumen	Rumen Nikolov	24	FW				11																		
(Angola)	Sandro	Sandro António Gomes	21	GK					→	12																
(Angola)	Sassoma	Martinho João Sassoma		MF	5																					
(Ghana)	Seth	Seth Owusu	29	DF													22	^{3}	^{0}	→						
(Zambia)	Sipho	Sipho Mumbi	28	MF	–																					
(Angola)	Sony	Cornélio Pinto Colino Chicola	22														33	^{4(1)}	^{0}	14	^{2}	^{0}				
(Angola)	Sozito	Mário Bernardo Keita	24	DF													→			26	^{23}	^{1}				→
(Angola)	Stanick	Caetano Manuel Domingos		FW	–																					
(Portugal)	Targino	Tiago João Targino da Silva	30	MF					→	–	→															
(Angola)	Tino Cassinda	Celestino Calueio Cassinda	23	FW																22	^{1(3)}	^{0}				
(Angola)	Tino Francisco	Augusto Francisco						→	27																	
(Angola)	Tito Samba	Tito Paulino Samba		FW	–																					
(Angola)	Tomboka	Pedro Domingos Jerónimo		MF	10		10	2	2																	
(Angola)	Tucho	Edson Orlando A. Stok Cardoso	26	FW					→	20	→															
(Angola)	Tumba	Osvaldo Lupa		MF	–																					
(Angola)	Vadinho Luana	Vasco Tchacama Luana	24	MF										→			17	^{5}	^{1}							
(Angola)	Vado Alves	Artur Carvalho Baptista Alves	28	DF				→	3	3	3	^{4(2)}	^{0}	→												
(Angola)	Valdez	Hugo Anderson de Almeida Valdez Lourenço	–	DF	6	→											→			20	^{11(3)}	^{0}	↑			
(São Tomé and Príncipe)	Vander	Vander Ramos Pinto	28	MF							→			7	^{24(1)}	^{2}	→			11	^{12(2)}	^{0}				
(Angola)	Viet	Inácio Maulitano Cassuque	20	FW	23	→																				
(Angola)	Viví Cigarro	David Kachimongo Faria Cigarro	26	MF	7	→																				
(Angola)	Walter Cambondo	Walter Cambondo		FW	–																					
(Angola)	Wilson Alegre	Wilson Edgar Pereira Alegre	31	GK					24	→																
(Angola)	Yano Capingala	Feliciano Chitandula Simão Capingala		FW	–																					
(Angola)	Zebedeu	Zebedeu Jordão S. Morais	–	DF						→	29	^{23}	^{1}	29	^{26(1)}	^{1}	→			29	^{3}	^{0}	↑			
(Angola)	Zezinho Avelino	José Horácio Artur Avelino	28	MF	11	→	11																			
(Angola)	Zico Nolongolo	Fernando Zico Manuel Nolongolo		DF	16	→																				
(Angola)	Zinga, Yousouf	Yousouf Lutonadio Zinga	25	DF						–																
(Angola)	Zizí	Isidro de Oliveira André Manuel	21	MF							17	^{5(6)}	^{1}	→												
Years					2011	2012	2013	2014	2015	2016	2017			2018			2018–19		21	2019-20		25				

== 2001–2010 ==
Académica Petróleos do Lobito players 2001–2010

Nat	Nick	Name	A	P	J. Machado		N.J.	A. César		A.L. Chiby		J.P.	Tramagal		
Nat	Nick	Name	A	P	2001	2002	2003	2004	2005	2006	2007	2008	2009	2010	
Nat	Nick	Name	A	P	4	6	6	10	13	5	4	2	14	2	
(Angola)	Ady	Adilson Joaquim Manuel	20	DF								2008	2009		
(Angola)	Alex			DF			2003								
(Angola)	Alino			MF				2004							
(Angola)	Bemberé	Eduardo Ventura Augusto		MF										2010	→
(Angola)	Benjamim Cigarro	Benjamim Faria Cigarro		MF			2003								
(Angola)	Betinho	Alberto Augusto Jorge Paulo	33	MF					2005	2006	Royal Sporting Club Anderlecht	Futebol Clube do Porto	2009	Al Jazira Abu Dhabi (Emiratos Árabes Unidos)	
(Angola)	Bobó	Dauda Diantela Bobo		DF									2009		
(Angola)	Bolingó	Edvaldo Elvis Calado de Pina		MF				2004	2005				2009	→	
(Angola)	Boneco	Manuel Pilartes Sambambi		GK									2009		
(Angola)	Buffon		28	GK								2008	2009		
(Angola)	Buta	Pedro Buta		MF				→	2005	→					
(Angola)	Calei	Eugénio Sambambi	–	DF								2008	2009		↑
(Angola)	Castela												2009		
(Angola)	César Caná	César João Muto	36	FW			2003	2004	2005	2006		2008			
(Angola)	Cristiano	Cristiano Bernardo Quitembo	–	DF										2010	↑
(Angola)	Dady	Zeco Kutonda		FW			2003	2004	2005	2006					
(Angola)	Dani			DF						2006					
(Angola)	David Cigarro	David Kachimongo Faria Cigarro		MF			2003	2004		2006				2010	
(Angola)	Debaile	José Felix Pacavira de Carvalho		MF								→	2009		
(Angola)	Ernesto Kotel	Ernesto Kotel		DF			2003	2004	2005	2006		2008			
(Angola)	Esmael	Esmael João Lucas	–	FW										2010	↑
(Angola)	Feliciano	Feliciano Domingos Tchissapa	–	GK										2010	↑
(Angola)	Filipe			GK			2003								
(Angola)	Gamarra			MF						2006					
(Angola)	Germano	Germano Cagiza Diogo	–	DF										2010	↑
(Angola)	Gibril	Miguel Ngoy		FW					2005						
(Angola)	Guiguí	Francisco Sawanga Calunjinji	34	MF								→	2009	2010	→
(Angola)	Guy	Carlos Alberto da Silva Luciano	–	DF			2003	2004	2005	2006	→	→	2009	2010	↑
(Angola)	Jerry			MF						2006					
(Angola)	Jó	Martins Geovety P. Gervásio		MF						2006			2009		
(Angola)	Jordão						2003								
(Angola)	Joy			MF									2009		
(Angola)	Joãozinho			DF								2008	2009		
(Angola)	Joaquim	Joaquim José Pedro		GK					2005						
(Angola)	Joaquim			DF									2009		
(Angola)	Joque	Joque Sebastião Carvalho Cosme		GK						2006					
(Angola)	Kikí	Garcia Afonso André	26	GK								→	2009	→	
(Angola)	Kilombo	Paulino Joaquim Clemente	21	DF								→	2009		
(Angola)	Kiwa			MF									2009		
(Angola)	Lami	Paulo Monteiro Lami		MF				→	2005						
(Angola)	Lebú			DF				2004							
(Angola)	Lucas	Lucas Huango	19	FW				2004	→						
(Angola)	Luís	Martins Luís		MF								→	2009		
(Angola)	Lunguinha	António Luís dos Santos Serrado	18	DF				2004	→						
(Angola)	Macolo			MF								2008			
(Republic of the Congo)	Makosso	Holgersson Makosso Ndouma		FW				2004							
(Angola)	Malone	Narciso Jorge Bilanda	–	MF								2008	2009	2010	↑
(Angola)	Manú			MF			2003								
(Democratic Republic of the Congo)	Masiala	Masiala Nguvulo Samuel		MF				2004	2005	→		2008	2009		
(Democratic Republic of the Congo)	Massaro	Mabundu Makumona Phillippe		FW			2003	2004	→						
(Angola)	Mateus			DF						2006			2009		
(Angola)	Mauro	Manuel Lourenço Gomes		FW					2005	→					
(Angola)	Mbala			MF				2004							
(Angola)	Metsy			DF			2003	2004	2005	2006			2009		
(Angola)	Mingo	Domingos Pambo	–	DF										2010	↑
(Angola)	Miranda			DF				2004	2005	→					
(Angola)	Nanana	Vasco Manuel Jorge Custódio		DF					2005	2006					
(Angola)	Nando	Nguizani Pedro Sebastião Mundele	–	DF									2009		↑
(Angola)	Nato Faial	Pedro Renato Faial		FW								→	2009		
(Angola)	Ndulo	Francisco Ndulo Cachindele	26	GK		2002	→								
(Angola)	Nelo			DF			2003	→							
(Angola)	Nelson	Nelson Cláudio Saiose Manuel		DF					2005	→					
(Angola)	Nilton			MF									2009		
(Angola)	Nkosi	Nkosi Muanza		MF				2004	2005						
(Angola)	Paty	António Sapalo Lohoca Justo	18	MF								2008	→		
(Angola)	Paulito	Paulo Quental Fuxe	25				2003	2004							
(Angola)	Quim Manuel	Joaquim José Pedro Manuel	31						2005						
(Angola)	Rogério			GK			2003								
(Republic of the Congo)	Romeo	Roméo Gautier Ayessa	25	FW								→	2009	→	
(Angola)	Sacalunga			FW			2003								
(Angola)	Sassoma	Martinho João Sassoma	–	MF								→	2009		↑
(Angola)	Satula	Jorge Wanga Satula		MF					2005						
(Angola)	Silas			DF					2005						
(Angola)	Sol	Daniel Lutangu Sunga	25	FW								2008	2009		
(Angola)	Tavares			FW								2008	2009		
(Angola)	Tidy			MF			2003	2004							
(Angola)	Toy			MF			2003								
(Angola)	Tucho	Edson Orlando A. Stok Cardoso	–	FW									→	2010	→
(Angola)	Valdir			DF						2006					
(Angola)	Vilar	Modesto Feliciano		DF		2002	2003	2004							
(Angola)	Weah						2003	2004							
(Democratic Republic of the Congo)	Willy	Willy Etina Bela		GK				2004	2005	→					
(Angola)	Xavier			DF				2004	2005						
(Angola)	Zebedeu		–	DF									2009		↑
(Angola)	Zequinhas	Ezequias Quizambi		DF					2005						
(Angola)	Zezinho	José Horácio Artur Avelino	–	MF			2003	2004	2005	→		→	2009	2010	↑
(Angola)	Zico	Fernando Zico Manuel Nolongolo	–	DF									2009	2010	↑
(Democratic Republic of the Congo)	Zola	Zola Nseka		MF					2005						
Years					2001	2002	2003	2004	2005	2006	2007	2008	2009	2010	

== 1991–2000 ==
Académica Petróleos do Lobito players 1991–2000

Nat	Nick	Name	A	P	A.P.					A.C.		Carlos Queirós		
Nat	Nick	Name	A	P	1991	1992	1993	1994	1995	1996	1997	1998	1999	2000
Nat	Nick	Name	A	P	–	–	–	–	–	–	–	–	–	–
(Angola)	Barata									1996				2000
(Angola)	Bruno													2000
(Angola)	César Caná									1996				2000
(Angola)	Dinis													2000
(Angola)	Kotel	Ernesto Kotel								1996				2000
(Angola)	Kui													2000
(Angola)	Lito									1996				
(Angola)	Martinho									1996				
(Angola)	Mila									1996				
(Angola)	Modê													2000
(Angola)	Mota Veiga									1996				
(Angola)	Mukendi													2000
(Angola)	Naná									1996				
(Angola)	Ndulo			GK										2000
(Angola)	Nelito									1996				
(Angola)	Padó													2000
(Angola)	Paulo Augusto									1996				
(Angola)	Rats	Ambrósio Amaro Manuel Pascoal	19	MF						1996				
(Angola)	Santana									1996				
(Angola)	Willy									1996				
(Angola)	Zezinho													2000
Years					1991	1992	1993	1994	1995	1996	1997	1998	1999	2000

== 1979-1981 ==
Académica Petróleos do Lobito players 1979-1981

Nat	Nick	Name	A	P	P	R.G.	Gonçalves		CH
Nat	Nick	Name	A	P	1979	1980	1981	1982	1983
Nat	Nick	Name	A	P	–	–	–	–	–
(Angola)	Abel			DF	1979	1980	1981	1982	
(Angola)	Adriano			MF		1980			
(Angola)	Afonso			DF				→	1983
(Angola)	Águas			DF		1980			
(Spain)	António	António El Maricon Jimenez		DF			1981		
(Angola)	Apanhado			MF					1983
(Angola)	Arlindo			MF		1980			
(Angola)	Arnaldo	Arnaldo Ferreira Chaves Júnior	33	MF		1980	1981		
(Angola)	Augusto			DF	1979	1980			
(Angola)	Bailundo			DF		1980	1981	1982	1983
(Angola)	Bandeira	Simão Bandeira		DF		1980	1981	1982	1983
(Angola)	Bastos			DF			1981		
(Angola)	Batalha			MF			1981		
(Angola)	Batata			MF	1979	1980	1981	1982	
(Angola)	Bayombo			FW			1981		
(Angola)	Benvindo	Mário Afonso de Carvalho		DF	1979	1980	1981	1982	1983
(Angola)	Cambiona †	Zacarias Cambiona		GK				1982	1983
(Angola)	Carvalhinho			MF					1983
(Angola)	Chiby	António da Conceição Lopes	31	MF	1979	1980	1981	1982	1983
(Angola)	Chiby II			DF	1979				
(Italy)	Chlaid Claudio Mazzini †		†||data-sort-value="4"|FW||||||||1982||1983						
(Angola)	Comandala			MF			1981	1982	
(Angola)	Conceição						1981		
(Angola)	Correia Jr.					1980			
(Angola)	Coyo			MF		1980	1981		
(Angola)	Delgado			DF		1980			
(Angola)	Diamalenga			FW				1982	
(Angola)	Djalma			DF		1980			
(Angola)	Domingos			MF		1980			
(Angola)	Dudas			MF				1982	
(Angola)	Evaristo			DF	1979	1980			
(Angola)	Firmino			FW					1983
(Italy)	Franco Gorrasi			FW	1979	1980			
(Angola)	Inácio			DF		1980			
(Angola)	Jacinto				1979				
(Angola)	Jindungo			FW			1981	1982	
(Angola)	Joaquim	Joaquim Felix Feliciano Machado		GK				→	1983
(Angola)	Joaquim	Joaquim Miranda		GK	1979	1980	1981		
(Angola)	Kalunguembi			DF			1981		
(Angola)	Lino Cipriano			MF					1983
(Angola)	Marcolino			GK			1981	1982	
(Angola)	Marques			DF		1980			
(Italy)	Matteo	Matteo Mindaugas Di Nardo		MF	1979	1980	1981	1982	
(Angola)	Mateus II			FW		1980			1983
(Angola)	Mazambo			DF				1982	
(Angola)	Miranda			MF		1980			
(Angola)	Moio				1979				
(Angola)	Muenho			MF		1980	1981		
(Angola)	Nara							1982	
(Angola)	Nelito			MF	1979	1980			
(Angola)	Nelito II			DF		1980	1981		
(Angola)	Paiata								1983
(Angola)	Pina			DF		1980			
(Angola)	Pintar	Fernando José Pintar		DF	1979	1980		1982	
(Angola)	Quintas			DF	1979				
(Angola)	Rafael			GK		1980			
(Angola)	Raimundo			MF			1981		
(Angola)	Ratinho			DF			1981	1982	1983
(Angola)	Sadélio			DF	1979				
(Angola)	Sakulo			DF			1981		
(Angola)	Sansão			DF					1983
(Angola)	Santos			DF		1980			
(Angola)	Sapesso			DF		1980			
(Angola)	Sayombo †	António da Anunciação Domingos	26	FW		1980	1981	1982	→
(Angola)	Sicato						1981		
(Angola)	Tatra			DF	1979				
(Angola)	Timóteo			DF				1982	
(Angola)	Tó							1982	1983
(Angola)	Tomás			GK		1980	1981		1983
(Angola)	Tomáz	Tomás António		FW				1982	1983
(Angola)	Tony			FW	1979				1983
(Angola)	Toy								1983
(Italy)	Simone Tulimieri	Simone Tulimieri						1982	
(Angola)	Zé Pedro	José Pedro				1980	1981		1983
(Angola)	Zeca			MF				→	1983
(Angola)	Zeferino			FW			1981		
(Angola)	Zezito								1983
Years					1979	1980	1981	1982	1983
