= 2018–19 Segundona =

Segundona
- Season: 2019
- Champions: Ferrovia do Huambo
- Matches: 56
- Goals: 139 (2.48 per match)
- Top goalscorer: Cuxixima, Vimguba and Rubson (4 goals)
- Biggest home win: Wiliete 5 Sporting 0 (21 May 2019)
- Biggest away win: Paulo FC 0 1º de Maio 3 (18 May 2019)
- Highest scoring: 1º de Maio 4 Sporting 3 (29 May 2019)
- Longest winning run: 1º de Maio (5) (15 May–29 May)
- Longest unbeaten run: Ferrovia (9) (24 Mar–18 May)
- Longest winless run: Sporting (14) (03 Mar–29 May)
- Longest losing run: Paulo FC (4) (11 May–26 May)
- All statistics correct as of 29 May 2019.

The 2019 Segundona is the 25th season of the second-tier football league in Angola.

The league comprises 8 teams to play in a (home & away) double round robin system, the three first ranking of which being automatically promoted to the 2019–20 Girabola.

== Stadia and locations ==
Locations of the 2019 Segundona teams

P	Team	Home city	Stadium	Capacity	2018
–	AKC FC	Ondjiva	Estádio dos Castilhos	429	4th in Segundona, Sr B
–	Benfica do Lubango	Lubango	Estádio 11 de Novembro	6,000	DNP
–	Domant FC	Caxito	Estádio Municipal	5,000	DNP
–	Ferroviário do Huambo	Huambo	Estádio dos Kurikutelas	10,000	2nd in Segundona, Sr B
–	Jackson Garcia	Benguela	Estádio de S. Filipe	5,000	3rd in Segundona, Sr B
–	Paulo FC	Caxito	Estádio Municipal	5,000	DNP
–	Primeiro de Maio	Benguela	Estádio Edelfride Costa	6,000	DNP
–	Sporting de Benguela	Benguela	Estádio de S. Filipe	5,000	5th in Segundona, Sr B
–	Wiliete SC	Benguela	Estádio de Ombaka	35,000	DNP

== Match details ==
All teams play in a double round robin system (home and away).

Round 1

Sat, 02 Mar 2019	Paulo FC	1–3	Benfica Lubango	Caxito
15:30	Martins 43'		54' Frank; 75' Bumba; 90+4' Vingumba	Stadium: Municipal

Sat, 02 Mar 2019	1º de Maio	1–3	Wiliete SC	Benguela
15:30	Kito 9'		16' (pen.) Marcos; 41' João Vala; 45' Vovó	Stadium: Edelfride Costa

Sun, 03 Mar 2019	Jackson Garcia	1–1	Sporting Benguela	Benguela
15:30				Stadium: São Filipe

Sun, 03 Mar 2019	Domant FC	1–3	Ferrovia Huambo	Caxito
15:30	Cuxixima		Mário; Djaba; Paizinho	Stadium: Municipal

Round 10

Sat, 27 Apr 2019	Benfica Lubango	2–0	Paulo FC	Lubango
15:00	Robson; Vingumba			Stadium: Ferrovia

Sun, 28 Apr 2019	Wiliete SC	1–1	1º de Maio	Benguela
16:00	Vovó 11' (pen.)		44' Eduardo	Stadium: Ombaka; Referee: Miguel Américo

Sat, 27 Apr 2019	Sporting Benguela	2–3	Jackson Garcia	Benguela
15:00				Stadium: São Filipe

Sat, 27 Apr 2019	Ferrovia Huambo	2–0	Domant FC	Huambo
15:00	Man Belé 69'; Mário 78'	Report		Stadium: Kurikutelas; Referee: Sanda Kitu; A. Teixeira, B. Capingala

Round 2

Sat, 09 Mar 2019	Ferrovia Huambo	3–0	Paulo FC	Huambo
15:30				Stadium: Kurikutelas

Sat, 09 Mar 2019	Sporting Benguela	0–2	Domant FC	Benguela
15:30				Stadium: São Filipe

Sun, 10 Mar 2019	~~AKC FC~~	~~0–1~~	~~1º de Maio~~	Ondjiva
15:00			Cebola	Stadium: Castilhos

Sun, 10 Mar 2019	Wiliete SC	0–1	Jackson Garcia	Benguela
16:00				Stadium: Ombaka; Referee: Armando Silva; Manuel Lobe, Alberto Dumbi

Round 11

Wed, 01 May 2019	Paulo FC	1–1	Ferrovia Huambo	Caxito
15:30	Fofucho 14'		22' Manucho	Stadium: Municipal; Referee: Agostinho Soque; João Fula, António Miguel

Thu, 02 May 2019	Domant FC	2–0	Sporting Benguela	Caxito
15:30				Stadium: Municipal

Cancelled	~~1º de Maio~~	–	~~AKC FC~~	Benguela
15:30				Stadium: Edelfride Costa

Wed, 01 May 2019	Jackson Garcia	1–1	Wiliete SC	Benguela
15:30	Bebucho 90+2'		14' J.Vala	Stadium: Ombaka; Referee: Alberto Bartolomeu; A. Teixeira, B. Capingala

Round 3

Sat, 16 Mar 2019	Benfica Lubango	2–0	Ferrovia Huambo	Lubango
15:30	Robson 24', 75'			Stadium: 11 de Novembro; Referee: Pedro Cachissoca; António Salazar, José Capi

Sat, 16 Mar 2019	Paulo FC	0–0	Sporting Benguela	Caxito
15:00				Stadium: Municipal

Sun, 17 Mar 2019	Domant FC	1–2	Wiliete SC	Caxito
15:00	Cuxixima		53'	Stadium: Municipal

Sun, 17 Mar 2019	~~Jackson Garcia~~	~~0–0~~	~~AKC FC~~	Benguela
15:30				Stadium: São Filipe

Round 12

Sat, 04 May 2019	Ferrovia Huambo	1–0	Benfica Lubango	Huambo
15:30	Tchony 90' (pen.)	Report		Stadium: Kurikutelas; Referee: Bernardo Moreira; L. Miguel, P. Micolo

Sat, 04 May 2019	Sporting Benguela	1–1	Paulo FC	Benguela
16:00	Bijú 61'		32' Fidel	Stadium: São Filipe; Referee: Laurindo Aurélio; T. Kapuzeco, A. Dua

Sun, 05 May 2019	Wiliete SC	2–2	Domant FC	Benguela
16:00	Geovani 45+4'; Kalambi 64'		17' Lino; 23' Izgo	Stadium: Ombaka; Referee: Edson Essoko; A. Paulino, F. Charles

Cancelled	~~AKC FC~~	–	~~Jackson Garcia~~	Ondjiva
15:00				Stadium: Castilhos

Round 4

Wed, 20 Mar 2019	1º de Maio	2–1	Jackson Garcia	Benguela
15:30	Kito 11'; Miguel 17'		38' (pen.) Okocha	Stadium: Edelfride Costa; Referee: Miguel Américo

Wed, 20 Mar 2019	~~AKC FC~~	~~2–4~~	~~Domant FC~~	Ondjiva
15:30				Stadium: Castilhos

Wed, 20 Mar 2019	Sporting Benguela	0–1	Benfica Lubango	Benguela
15:30			50' Vingumba	Stadium: São Filipe; Referee: Laurindo Aurélio; Aug. Dina, Tomás Macatuala

Thu, 21 Mar 2019	Wiliete SC	1–0	Paulo FC	Benguela
16:00	Etoh 17'			Stadium: Ombaka; Referee: Alberto Bartolomeu; António Miguel, João Fula

Round 13

Sat, 11 May 2019	Jackson Garcia	2–1	1º de Maio	Benguela
15:30				Stadium: Ombaka; Referee: Pedro Catchissoca

Cancelled	~~Domant FC~~	–	~~AKC FC~~	Caxito
15:00				Stadium: Municipal

Sat, 11 May 2019	Benfica Lubango	4–0	Sporting Benguela	Lubango
15:30				Stadium: Ferrovia

Sat, 11 May 2019	Paulo FC	0–1	Wiliete SC	Caxito
15:30				Stadium: Municipal

Round 5

Sat, 23 Mar 2019	~~Paulo FC~~	~~Walkover~~	~~AKC FC~~	Caxito
15:30				Stadium: Municipal

Sun, 24 Mar 2019	Benfica Lubango	1–0	Wiliete SC	Lubango
15:30	Madjer 62'			Stadium: Ferrovia; Referee: Bernardo Moreira; João Fula, António Miguel

Sun, 24 Mar 2019	Domant FC	3–2	1º de Maio	Caxito
15:30	Dinho 32', 42'; Cuxixima 84' (pen.)		12' Cebola; 71' (o.g.) Dadá	Stadium: Municipal; Referee: Agostinho Soque; Celso António, Pedro Micolo

Sun, 24 Mar 2019	Ferrovia Huambo	1–0	Sporting Benguela	Huambo
16:00	Man Belé 43'			Stadium: Kurikutelas; Referee: Nelson Milagre; Evandro Rocha, M. Coelho

Round 14

Cancelled	~~AKC FC~~	–	~~Paulo FC~~	Ondjiva
15:00				Stadium: Castilhos

Wed, 15 May 2019	Wiliete SC	1–0	Benfica Lubango	Benguela
16:00				Stadium: Ombaka

Wed, 15 May 2019	1º de Maio	2–1	Domant FC	Benguela
15:30				Stadium: Edelfride Costa

Wed, 15 May 2019	Sporting Benguela	0–0	Ferrovia Huambo	Benguela
15:30				Stadium: São Filipe

Round 6

Sat, 30 Mar 2019	1º de Maio	2–1	Paulo FC	Benguela
15:30	Mauro 53'; Mendes 73'		45+2' Barulho	Stadium: Edelfride Costa; Referee: F. Tchongolola

Sat, 30 Mar 2019	~~AKC FC~~	~~1–0~~	~~Benfica Lubango~~	Ondjiva
15:30				Stadium: Castilhos

Sat, 30 Mar 2019	Jackson Garcia	1–0	Domant FC	Benguela
15:30	Bebucho 48'			Stadium: Ombaka

Mon, 01 Apr 2019	Wiliete SC	3–3	Ferrovia Huambo	Benguela
16:00	Marcos 12'; Etoh 49', 82'		3' Man Belé; 79' Paizinho; 90' Tchony	Stadium: Ombaka

Round 15

Sat, 18 May 2019	Paulo FC	0–3	1º de Maio	Caxito
15:30			64' Eduardo; 67' Ning; 87' Greg	Stadium: Municipal; Referee: Irene Pinto

Cancelled	~~Benfica Lubango~~	–	~~AKC FC~~	Lubango
15:00				Stadium: Ferrovia

Sun, 19 May 2019	Domant FC	3–2	Jackson Garcia	Caxito
15:30				Stadium: Municipal

Sat, 18 May 2019	Ferrovia Huambo	1–0	Wiliete SC	Huambo
16:00	Rodrigo 90'	Report		Stadium: Kurikutelas; Referee: Sanda Kito; A. Teixeira, S. Kapingala

Round 7

Sat, 06 Apr 2019	Benfica Lubango	0–0	1º de Maio	Lubango
15:30				Stadium: Ferrovia

Sat, 06 Apr 2019	~~Ferrovia Huambo~~	~~1–1~~	~~AKC FC~~	Huambo
15:30	Paizinho 7'		66' Di Maria	Stadium: Kurikutelas

Sat, 06 Apr 2019	Paulo FC	1–0	Jackson Garcia	Caxito
15:30				Stadium: Municipal

Sat, 06 Apr 2019	Sporting Benguela	0–0	Wiliete SC	Benguela
15:30				Stadium: São Filipe

Round 16

Wed, 22 May 2019	1º de Maio	3–0	Benfica Lubango	Benguela
15:30				Stadium: Edelfride Costa

Cancelled	~~AKC FC~~	–	~~Ferrovia Huambo~~	Ondjiva
15:00				Stadium: Castilhos

Wed, 22 May 2019	Jackson Garcia	1–0	Paulo FC	Benguela
15:30	Igor 15'			Stadium: Ombaka

Tue, 21 May 2019	Wiliete SC	5–0	Sporting Benguela	Benguela
16:00				Stadium: Ombaka

Round 8

Sat, 13 Apr 2019	1º de Maio	1–2	Ferrovia Huambo	Benguela
15:30				Stadium: Edelfride Costa

Sat, 13 Apr 2019	~~AKC FC~~	~~1–0~~	~~Sporting Benguela~~	Ondjiva
15:30				Stadium: Castilhos

Sat, 13 Apr 2019	Jackson Garcia	2–1	Benfica Lubango	Benguela
15:30				Stadium: Ombaka

Sun, 14 Apr 2019	Domant FC	1–1	Paulo FC	Caxito
15:30	Cuxixima 62'			Stadium: Municipal; Referee: Pedro Calumbi

Round 17

Sat, 25 May 2019	Ferrovia Huambo	1–2	1º de Maio	Huambo
15:00	Caquenha 56'	Report	88' Greg; 90+1' Cebola	Stadium: Kurikutelas; Referee: Nelson Milagre; C. Golombole, M. Coelho

Cancelled	~~Sporting Benguela~~	–	~~AKC FC~~	Benguela
15:00				Stadium: São Filipe

Sat, 25 May 2019	Benfica Lubango	3–0	Jackson Garcia	Lubango
15:00	Messias 62'; Vingumba 71'; Di Maria			Stadium: Ferrovia

Sun, 26 May 2019	Paulo FC	0–2	Domant FC	Caxito
15:30			4' Boss; 25' (pen.) Cuxixima	Stadium: Municipal; Referee: Carlos Armando

Round 9

Wed, 17 Apr 2019	Benfica Lubango	3–1	Domant FC	Lubango
15:30	Nim; Robson; Vingumba		6' Cuxixima	Stadium: Ferrovia

Wed, 17 Apr 2019	Ferrovia Huambo	3–1	Jackson Garcia	Huambo
15:30	Tchony 27', 46'; Mário 59'	Report	90+3' Máquina	Stadium: Kurikutelas; Referee: Bernardo Moreira; João Fula, António Miguel

Wed, 17 Apr 2019	Sporting Benguela	0–1	1º de Maio	Benguela
15:30				Stadium: São Filipe

Wed, 17 Apr 2019	~~Wiliete SC~~	~~Walkover~~	~~AKC FC~~	Benguela
16:00				Stadium: Ombaka

Round 18

Wed, 29 May 2019	Domant FC	1–1	Benfica Lubango	Caxito
15:30	Izgo 1'		70' (pen.) Robson	Stadium: Municipal; Referee: Nelson Milagre; P. Micolo, M. Coelho

Wed, 29 May 2019	Jackson Garcia	1–2	Ferrovia Huambo	Benguela
15:00	Alexandre 56'		58' Paulo; 90' Man Belé	Stadium: São Filipe; Referee: Bernardo Moreira; J. fula, A. Miguel

Wed, 29 May 2019	1º de Maio	Walkover	Sporting Benguela	Benguela
15:30	Miguel 53'; Ning 56'; Bokungu 70'; Mona 90'		12', 41' Além; 90+3' Bijú	Stadium: Edelfride Costa; Referee: Irene Pinto; S. Capingala, A. Teixeira

Cancelled	~~AKC FC~~	–	~~Wiliete SC~~	Ondjiva
15:30				Stadium: Castilhos

== Table & results ==
Pos	Team	Pld	W	D	L	GF	GA	GD	Pts	Qualification or relegation	FER	BLB	WIL	MAI	JAC	DOM	SCB	PAU	AKC
1	Ferroviário do Huambo (C)	14	9	3	2	23	12	+11	30	Qualification for Girabola		1–0	1–0	1–2	3–1	2–0	1–0	3–0	~~1–1~~
2	Benfica do Lubango	14	8	2	4	21	10	+11	26	Qualification for Girabola	2–0		1–0	0–0	3–0	3–1	4–0	2–0	–
3	Wiliete SC	14	6	5	3	20	12	+8	23 (Note: Head-to-head results: 1º de Maio 1 Wiliete 3; Wiliete 1 1º de Maio 1.)	Qualification for Girabola	3–3	1–0		1–1	0–1	2–2	5–0	1–0	~~wo~~
4	Primeiro de Maio (Note: Primeiro de Maio lost their last match by default in their capacity as the home team as a result of several irregularities that occurred during the match, including poor security that resulted in court invasion, skirmishes and physical assault by their supporters to members of the opponent's team, a 1-hour interruption of the match, poor lightning conditions upon resumption of the match and the opponent's team supporters being prevented from entering the stadium.)	14	7	2	5	21	18	+3	23		1–2	3–0	1–3		2–1	2–1	0–3	2–1	–
5	Jackson Garcia	14	6	2	6	17	20	−3	20		1–2	2–1	1–1	2–1		1–0	1–1	1–0	~~0–0~~
6	Domant FC	14	5	3	6	20	21	−1	18		1–3	1–1	1–2	3–2	3–2		2–0	1–1	–
7	Sporting de Benguela	14	1	5	8	7	21	−14	8		0–0	0–1	0–0	0–1	2–3	0–2		1–1	–
8	Paulo FC	14	1	4	9	6	21	−15	7		1–1	1–3	0–1	0–3	1–0	0–2	0–0		~~wo~~
9	AKC (Note: AKC were disqualified following losses by default against Paulo FC (R5) and Wiliete SC (R9).) (D)	7	2	2	3	5	9	−4	0	Disqualified	–	~~1–0~~	–	~~0–1~~	–	~~2–4~~	~~1–0~~	–	

Updated to match(es) played on 29 May 2019. Source: Girabola.com
Rules for classification: 1) Points; 2) Head-to-head points; 3) Head-to-head goal difference; 4) Goal difference; 5) Goals scored; 6) Fair-play points; 7) Play-off.
(C) Champions; (D) Disqualified
Notes:

2019 Segundona champion

1st title

Squad:
José, Zebedeu (GK)
Ávila, Feto, Man Belé, My, Nzau, Sekesseke (DF)
Chabalala, Chuna, Edmilson, Kakuenha, Ngueve, Paulo, Rafa, Tchony (MF)
Bebo, Manucho, Mário, Paizinho (FW)
João Pintar (Head Coach)

== See also ==
- 2018–19 Girabola
