= 2020–21 Angola Cup =

Tournament details
- Country: Angola
- Dates: 19 May – 15 July 2021
- Teams: 23

Final positions
- Champions: Cancelled

Tournament statistics
- Matches played: 24
- Goals scored: 55 (2.29 per match)
- All statistics correct as of 4 December 2021.

The 2020–21 Taça de Angola was the 39th edition of the Taça de Angola, the second most important and the top knock-out football club competition in Angola following the Girabola.

Petro de Luanda won the tournament by beating Interclube 2–0 in the final and secure their 12th title.

== Stadia and locations ==
Locations of the 2020–21 Angola Cup teams

P	Team	Home city	Stadium	Capacity	2017	Current
–	Académica do Lobito	Lobito	Estádio do Buraco	3,000	R16	R16
–	AKC FC	Ondjiva	Estádio dos Castilhos	429	PR	PR
–	ASA	Luanda	Estádio da Cidadela	60,000	R16	R16
–	Benfica do Lubango	Lubango	Estádio do Ferroviário	25,000	DNP	WD
–	Bravos do Maquis	Luena	Estádio Mundunduleno	4,300	SF	QF
–	Semba FC	Cabinda	Estádio do Tafe	25,000	DNP	WD
–	Cuando Cubango FC	Kuito	Estádio dos Eucaliptos	3,300	DNP	R16
–	Desportivo da Huíla	Lubango	Estádio do Ferroviário	25,000	DNP	Runner-Up
–	Domant FC	Caxito	Estádio Municipal do Dande	5,000	R16	R16
–	Ferroviário do Huambo	Huambo	Estádio dos Kurikutelas	10,000	DNP	WD
–	Interclube	Luanda	Estádio 22 de Junho	7,000	QF	SF
–	Kabuscorp	Luanda	Estádio dos Coqueiros	8,000	QF	QF
–	Paulo FC	Caxito	Estádio Municipal do Dande	5,000	R16	DQ
–	Petro de Luanda	Luanda	Estádio 11 de Novembro	50,000	Champion	SF
–	Primeiro de Agosto	Luanda	Estádio 11 de Novembro	50,000	Runner-Up	Champion
–	Primeiro de Maio	Benguela	Estádio Edelfride Costa	6,000	QF	PR
–	Progresso do Sambizanga	Luanda	Estádio dos Coqueiros	8,000	SF	QF
–	Recreativo da Caála	Caála	Estádio Mártires da Canhala	12,000	R16	R16
–	Recreativo do Libolo	Calulo	Estádio Municipal de Calulo	10,000	R16	R16
–	Sagrada Esperança	Dundo	Estádio Sagrada Esperança	8,000	R16	R16
–	Santa Rita de Cássia	Uíge	Estádio 4 de Janeiro	12,000	QF	QF
–	Saurimo FC	Saurimo	Estádio das Mangueiras	7,000	R16	PR
–	Sporting de Cabinda	Cabinda	Estádio do Tafe	25,000	PR	WD
–	Wiliete SC	Benguela	Estádio Edelfride Costa	6,000	DNP	R16

== Preliminary rounds ==
Wed, 19 May 2021 PR	B. do Simulambuco	Walkover	Cuando Cubango	Cabinda
15:00				Stadium: Estádio do Tafe

Wed, 19 May 2021 PR	Desportivo Lunda Sul	2–1	Baixa de Cassanje	Saurimo
15:00	Filhão 19', 34'		53' Magrinho	Stadium: Estádio das Mangueiras; Referee: Paulo Sérgio

Wed, 19 May 2021 PR	Desportivo do Pombo	1–3	Recreativo do Libolo	Uíge
15:00	Ribéry 56'		3', 44' Ning; 45' (pen.) Pino	Stadium: 4 de Janeiro; Referee: José Maxia; Cláudio Vunge, Flávio Dias

Wed, 19 May 2021 PR	Jovens de Hoje	Walkover	Santa Rita	Luena
15:00				Stadium: Mundunduleno

Wed, 19 May 2021 PR	Kabuscorp	2–0	Ferrovia do Huambo	Luanda
15:00	Amaro 18' (pen.); Adilson 30'			Stadium: Estádio dos Coqueiros; Referee: Bernardo Nangolo; Jeremias Cafussa, Pedro Alberto

Wed, 19 May 2021 PR	Mundo Verde	1–3	Petro de Luanda	Sumbe
15:00	CK 21'		77' Vidinho; 85' Azulão; 87' Maya	Stadium: Estádio Hoji Ya Henda; Referee: Feliciano Lucas; Alexandre Bengue, Horácio Tchissingue

Wed, 19 May 2021 PR	Recreativo da Caála	Walkover	Sporting de Cabinda	Caála
15:00				Stadium: Estádio Mártires da Canhala

Wed, 19 May 2021 PR	Sporting do Bié	3–2	Progresso Sambizanga	Cuíto
15:00	João 21', 70'; Caquenha 65'		15' (pen.) Kiloy; 81' Ginebe	Stadium: Estádio dos Eucaliptos; Referee: Rodrigues Aleixo; Nicodemos Calembela, Francisco Paulo

== Round of 16 ==
Wed, 2 June 2021 R16	Desportivo Lunda Sul	0–2	Sagrada Esperança	Saurimo
15:00			10' Celso; 70' Jó Paciência	Stadium: Estádio das Mangueiras; Referee: Paulo Sérgio; Segunda Tchisseque, Lídio Coimbra

Wed, 2 June 2021 R16	Jovens de Hoje	2–6	1º de Agosto	Saurimo
15:00	Gorbacé 16'; Benjamin 43'	Report	5' Jó; 20' Melono; 46' Aldair; 53' Manelé; 58' Catraio; 79' (pen.) Mabululu	Stadium: Estádio das Mangueiras; Referee: Bernardo Moreira; Aldair Carmelino, Evandro da Rocha

Wed, 2 June 2021 R16	Kabuscorp	5–1	Sporting de Benguela	Luanda
15:00	Adilson; Juve 19' (o.g.); Cuxixima 20', 42'		Juve	Stadium: Estádio dos Coqueiros

Wed, 2 June 2021 R16	Petro de Luanda	1–0	Académica do Lobito	Lobito
15:00	Vidinho 6'			Stadium: Buraco

Wed, 2 June 2021 R16	Recreativo da Caála	3–0	Wiliete SC	Caála
15:00	Gildo 26'; Deco 51'; Depú 63'			Stadium: Estádio Mártires da Canhala; Referee: Rafael Dala; Nelson Kiala, Celso António

Wed, 2 June 2021 R16	Recreativo do Libolo	Walkover	Desportivo da Huíla	Calulo
15:00				Stadium: Municipal de Calulo

Wed, 2 June 2021 R16	Sporting do Bié	0–1	Interclube	Cuíto
15:00			80' Wilfried	Stadium: Estádio dos Eucaliptos; Referee: Benjamin Andrade; Manuel Benguela, Bernabé Ngulo

Tue, 8 June 2021 R16	B. do Simulambuco	0–1	Bravos do Maquis	Cabinda
15:00			19' Zico	Stadium: Estádio do Tafe

== Quarter-finals ==
Wed, 23 June 2021 QF	Recreativo da Caála	0–0 (2–4 p)	Interclube	Caála
15:00				Stadium: Mártires da Canhala; Referee: Paulo Sérgio; Segunda Tchisseque, Lídio Coimbra

Wed, 23 June 2021 QF	Bravos do Maquis	2–3	1º de Agosto	Luena
15:00	Estevão 51'; Da Banda 57'	Report	8', 20' Moya; 29' Melono	Stadium: Estádio Mundunduleno; Referee: Benjamin Andrade; Bernabé Ngulo, Manuel Benguela

Wed, 23 June 2021 QF	Sagrada Esperança	1–1 (4–5 p)	Kabuscorp	Dundo
15:00	Cachi 43'		85' Sebas	Stadium: Sagrada Esperança; Referee: Bernardo Nangolo; Pedro Alberto, António Pitra
	Penalties
	Caranga (penalty scored); Cachi (penalty scored); Matengó (penalty missed); Jó Paciência (penalty scored); Gaspar (penalty scored)		(penalty scored) Amaro; (penalty scored) Capita; (penalty scored) Cuxixima; (penalty scored) Miguel; (penalty scored) Neide

Sat, 3 July 2021 QF	Petro de Luanda	1–0	Recreativo do Libolo	Luanda
15:00	Vidinho 49'			Stadium: 11 de Novembro; Referee: Carlos Silva; Manuel Lobe, Alberto Dumbi

== Semifinals ==
Thu, 8 July 2021 SF	Kabuscorp	2–3	Interclube	Luanda
15:00	Nelito 42'; Amaro 79'		65' Dasfaa; 27', 47' Wilfried	Stadium: Estádio dos Coqueiros; Referee: Miguel Mateus; Luís Mateus, António Teixeira

Thu, 8 July 2021 SF	Petro de Luanda	2–0	1º de Agosto	Luanda
16:30	Maya 15'; Yano 88'			Stadium: 11 de Novembro; Referee: José Chitumba; Estanislau Guedes, Rosário Calembela

== Final ==
Thu, 15 July 2021
15:38

Petro de Luanda	2–0	Interclube
Pirolito 10' (o.g.); Figueira 87'	Report

11 de Novembro, Luanda
Attendance: 12,000
Referee: Mauro de Oliveira

Petro	Inter

GK	12	(Angola)	Elber
RB	25	(Angola)	Eddie
CB	18	(Angola)	Vidinho
CB	32	(Angola)	Mindinho
LB	19	(Angola)	Tó Carneiro
RM	17	(Angola)	Megue		(substituted off) 73'
CM	20	(Angola)	Além	(yellow card) 87'
CM	37	(Angola)	Maya
LM	7	(Angola)	Picas		(substituted off) 73'
FW	11	(Angola)	Job (c)		(substituted off) 89'
FW	26	(Brazil)	Azulão	(yellow card) 84'	(substituted off) 89'
Substitutions:
FW	19	(Brazil)	Tony		(substituted on) 73'
MF	23	(Angola)	Figueira		(substituted on) 73'
MF	8	(Angola)	Dany		(substituted on) 89'
MF	9	(Angola)	Yano		(substituted on) 89'
Manager:
(Angola) Mateus Bodunha

GK	12	(Angola)	Gelson
RB	25	(Angola)	Pirolito (c)
CB	3	(Angola)	Lito	(yellow card) 54' (yellow-red card) 61'
CB	17	(Angola)	Filipe	(yellow card) 69'
LB	28	(Angola)	Zé Panzo		(substituted off) 45'
RM	14	(Angola)	Paty		(substituted off) 90+2'
CM	6	(Angola)	Nandinho
CM	8	(Republic of the Congo)	Kaya		(substituted off) 67'
LM	21	(Angola)	Panilson		(substituted off) 76'
FW	7	(Cameroon)	Dasfaa
FW	9	(Ivory Coast)	Wilfried		(substituted off) 90+2'
Substitutions:
MF	10	(Angola)	Higino		(substituted on) 45'
MF	11	(Angola)	Jaredi		(substituted on) 67'
MF	15	(Angola)	Mano Calesso		(substituted on) 76'
MF	33	(Angola)	Dji		(substituted on) 90+2'
FW	18	(Angola)	Gazeta		(substituted on) 90+2'
Manager:
(Portugal) Ivo Campos

Assistant referees:
Lucas Caliongo
Joaquim Chiyo

Fourth official:

Commissioner:

== See also ==
- 2020–21 Girabola
- 2020–21 Angola Super Cup
- 2020–21 CAF Confederation Cup
