= List of football stadiums in Angola =

This is a list of football stadiums in Angola, ranked in descending order of capacity with at least 5,000 spectators. Some stadiums are football-specific and some are used for other purposes. The largest non-football stadium by capacity in Angola is the 12,750-capacity Helmarc Arena.

== Current stadiums ==
| # | Image | Stadium | Capacity | City | Home team |
|---|---|---|---|---|---|
| 1 | | Estádio 11 de Novembro | 50,000 | Viana | Primeiro de Agosto, Petro de Luanda; Benfica de Luanda, Angola national team |
| 2 | | Estádio da Cidadela | 40,000 | Luanda | ASA, Progresso do Sambizanga, Atlético Sport Aviação |
| 3 | | Estádio Nacional de Ombaka | 35,000 | Benguela | Nacional Benguela, Angola national team |
| 4 | | Estádio Nacional da Tundavala | 20,000 | Lubango | C.D. Huíla |
| 5 | | Estádio Nacional do Chiazi | 20,000 | Cabinda | F.C. Cabinda |
| 6 | | Estádio França Ndalu | 20,000 | Luanda | C.D. Primeiro de Agosto |
| 7 | | Estádio do Santos | 17,000 | Viana | Santos Futebol Clube |
| 8 | | Campo Mário Santiago | 16,000 | Luanda | Progresso do Sambizanga |
| 9 | | Estádio do Ferroviário da Huíla | 15,000 | Lubango | Desportivo da Huíla |
| 10 | | Estádio dos Coqueiros | 12,000 | Luanda | Kabuscorp |
| 11 | | Estádio Nossa Senhora do Monte | 12,000 | Lubango | Clube Desportivo da Huila |
| 12 | | Estádio dos Kurikutelas | 8,000 | Huambo | Ferroviário do Huambo, J.G.M. |
| 13 | | Estádio Joaquim Dinis | 7,500 | Luanda | G.D. Interclube |
| 14 | | Estádio Municipal Edelfride Palhares da Costa | 6,000 | Benguela | Estrela Clube Primeiro de Maio |
| 15 | | Estádio 4 de Janeiro | 5,000 | Uíge | ASK Dragão, Santa Rita de Cássia |
| 16 | | Estádio dos Imbondeiros | 3,000 | Soyo | Académica Petróleo Kwanda Soyo |

== See also ==
- List of association football stadiums by capacity
- List of African stadiums by capacity
- Football in Angola
- Lists of stadiums
