= 2003 Angola Cup =

Tournament details
- Country: Angola
- Dates: 8 Jun – 11 Nov 2003
- Teams: 19

Final positions
- Champions: Interclube
- Runners-up: Sagrada Esperança
- 2004 CAF Confederation Cup: Interclube (cup winner)

Tournament statistics
- Matches played: 15

The 2003 Taça de Angola was the 22nd edition of the Taça de Angola, the second most important and the top knock-out football club competition following the Girabola. Interclube beat Sagrada Esperança 1–0 in the final to secure its second title.

The winner qualified to the 2004 CAF Confederation Cup.

== Stadiums and locations ==
Locations of the 2003 Angola Cup teams

| P | Team | Home city | Stadium | Capacity | 2002 | Current | P |
|---|---|---|---|---|---|---|---|
| 5 | 15 de Setembro | Saurimo | Campo das Mangueiras | 3,000 | DNP | R16 | n/a |
| 5 | Académica do Lobito | Lobito | Estádio do Buraco | 10,000 | R16 | R16 | Steady |
| 3 | ASA | Luanda | Estádio da Cidadela | 60,000 | R16 | SF | ▲2 |
| 5 | Benfica de Luanda | Luanda | Campo de São Paulo | 2,000 | R16 | R16 | Steady |
| 6 | Benfica do Lubango | Lubango | | | PR | PR | Steady |
| 5 | Desportivo da Huíla | Lubango | Estádio do Ferrovia | 15,000 | Runner-up | R16 | ▼3 |
| 5 | FC de Cabinda | Cabinda | Estádio do Tafe | 25,000 | R16 | R16 | Steady |
| 1 | Interclube | Luanda | Estádio da Cidadela | 65,000 | R16 | Champion | ▲4 |
| 4 | Paraná FC | Luanda | Campo de S.Paulo | 2,000 | DNP | QF | n/a |
| 5 | Petro de Luanda | Luanda | Estádio da Cidadela | 65,000 | Champion | R16 | ▼4 |
| 3 | Petro do Huambo | Huambo | Estádio dos Kurikutelas | 10,000 | QF | SF | ▲1 |
| 4 | Primeiro de Agosto | Luanda | Estádio da Cidadela | 65,000 | SF | QF | ▼4 |
| 6 | Primeiro de Maio | Benguela | Estádio Municipal | 6,000 | R16 | PR | ▼1 |
| 5 | Progresso | Luanda | Estádio da Cidadela | 65,000 | QF | R16 | ▼1 |
| 4 | Ritondo | Malanje | Estádio 1º de Maio | | DNP | QF | n/a |
| 2 | Sagrada Esperança | Dundo | Estádio Sagrada Esperança | 8,000 | SF | Runner-up | ▲1 |
| 6 | Sonangol do Namibe (Note: Later changed their name to Atlético do Namibe) | Namibe | Estádio Joaquim Morais | 5,000 | R16 | PR | ▼1 |
| 4 | Sporting de Cabinda | Cabinda | Estádio do Tafe | 25,000 | QF | QF | Steady |
| 5 | Sporting do Sumbe | Sumbe | | | DNP | R16 | n/a |

== Championship bracket ==
The knockout rounds were played according to the following schedule:

- June 8 - preliminary rounds
- Jul 9 - 10: Round of 16
- Aug 23 - Sep 3: Quarter-finals
- Nov 8 / 9: Semi-finals
- Nov 11: Final

Preliminary Rounds; Sun, 8 Jun 2003
15 de Setembro (bye)
Sun, 8 Jun 2003
Petro do Huambo | 2
Sonangol do Namibe | 1
Sun, 8 Jun 2003 Walkover
Sporting de Cabinda | 3
Benfica do Lubango | 0
Desportivo da Huíla (bye)
Paraná FC (bye)
Progresso (bye)
Interclube (bye)
Sporting do Sumbe (bye)
FC de Cabinda (bye)
1º de Agosto (bye)
Petro de Luanda (bye)
Sagrada Esperança (bye)
Sun, 8 Jun 2003 Walkover
Benfica de Luanda | 3
Primeiro de Maio | 0
ASA (bye)
Ritondo (bye)
Académica Lobito (bye)

1/16 Finals; 9 / 10 Jul 2003
Wed, 9 Jul 2003
15 de Setembro | 1
Petro do Huambo | 2
Sun, 6 Jul 2003
Sporting de Cabinda | 1
Desportivo da Huíla | 0
Thu, 10 Jul 2003 (pen) a.e.t.
Paraná FC | 5
Progresso | 3
Wed, 9 Jul 2003
Interclube | 5
Sp do Sumbe | 0
Wed, 9 Jul 2003
FC de Cabinda | 1
1º de Agosto | 2
Thu, 10 Jul 2003 (pen) a.e.t.
Petro de Luanda | 1
Sagrada Esperança | 4
Wed, 9 Jul 2003
Benfica Luanda | 1
ASA | 4
Wed, 9 Jul 2003 Walkover
Ritondo | 3
Académica Lobito | 0

Quarterfinals; 23 Aug – 3 Sep 2003
Sun, 24 Aug 2003
Petro do Huambo | 1
Sporting de Cabinda | 0
Sat, 23 Aug 2003
Paraná FC | 1
Interclube | 2
Wed, 3 Sep 2003
Primeiro de Agosto | 0
Sagrada Esperança | 1
Tue, 2 Sep 2003
ASA | 2
Ritondo | 1

Semifinals; 8 / 9 Nov 2003
Sat, 8 Nov 2003
Petro do Huambo | 0
Interclube | 1
Sun, 9 Nov 2003 (pen) a.e.t.
Sagrada Esperança | 5
ASA | 2

Final; Tue, 11 Nov 2003
Tue, 11 Nov 2003 a.e.t.
Interclube | 1
Sagrada Esperança | 0

== Preliminary rounds ==
| Sun, 8 Jun 2003 PR | Petro Huambo | 2–1 | Sonangol Namibe | Huambo |
| 15:00 | Chiló 41'; Vunda 68' | | 80' Hugo | Stadium: Estádio do Ferrovia; Referee: Luís Manuel João |

| Sun, 8 Jun 2003 PR | Benfica Luanda | Walkover | 1º de Maio | Luanda |
| 15:00 | | | | Stadium: Campo de S.Paulo |

| Sun, 8 Jun 2003 PR | Sporting Cabinda | Walkover | Benfica Lubango | Cabinda |
| 15:00 | | | | Stadium: Estádio do Tafe |

== 1/16 finals ==
| Sun, 6 Jul 2003 R16 | Sp de Cabinda | 1–0 | Desp da Huíla | Cabinda |
| 15:00 | | | | Stadium: Estádio do Tafe |

| Wed, 9 Jul 2003 R16 | Interclube | 5–0 | Sp do Sumbe | Luanda |
| 15:00 | Nzinga 2' 12'; André 33' (pen.); Carlos 39'; Sassoma 90+1' | Report | | Stadium: Estádio da Cidadela; Referee: Venâncio de Matos; Bernardo Camula, José Muata |

| Wed, 9 Jul 2003 R16 | 15 de Setembro | 1–2 | Petro do Huambo | Saurimo |
| 15:00 | | | | Stadium: Campo das Mangueiras; Referee: Eduardo Kadicana |

| Wed, 9 Jul 2003 R16 | Ritondo | Walkover | Aca Lobito | Malanje |
| 18:30 | | | | Referee: José Soyamba |

| Wed, 9 Jul 2003 R16 | Benfica Luanda | 0–0 (a.e.t.) (1–4 p) | ASA | Luanda |
| 15:00 | | | | Stadium: Campo de S.Paulo; Referee: Manuel Francisco |
| | Penalties |
| | Manucho (penalty scored); Raúl (penalty missed); Buta (penalty missed) | | (penalty scored) Simão; (penalty scored) Jamba; (penalty scored) Délcio; (penalty scored) Malamba |

| Thu, 10 Jul 2003 R16 | FC Cabinda | 1–2 | 1º de Agosto | Cabinda |
| 15:00 | João 43' | | 31' Delgado; 34' Jonas | Stadium: Estádio do Tafe; Referee: Leopoldo Mavunza |

| Thu, 10 Jul 2003 R16 | Petro de Luanda | 0–0 (a.e.t.) (1–4 p) | Sagrada Esperança | Luanda |
| 15:00 | | Report | | Stadium: Estádio da Cidadela; Attendance: 3,500; Referee: Roberto Talaya Jr |
| | Penalties |
| | D.Caires (penalty scored); Chanda (penalty missed); Av.Lopes (penalty missed); Flávio (penalty missed) | | (penalty scored) Chinho; (penalty scored) Bondoso; (penalty scored) Andia; (penalty scored) Joni |

| Thu, 10 Jul 2003 R16 | Paraná FC | 1–1 (a.e.t.) (4–2 p) | Progresso | Luanda |
| 15:00 | | | | Stadium: Campo de S.Paulo |

== Quarter-finals ==
| Sat, 23 Aug 2003 QF | Paraná FC | 1–2 | Interclube | Luanda |
| 15:00 | Loló 51' (pen.) | Report | 18' Enoque; 47' Sassoma | Stadium: Estádio da Cidadela; Attendance: 500; Referee: Carlos Júlio |

| Sun, 24 Aug 2003 QF | Petro do Huambo | 1–0 | Sporting de Cabinda | Lubango |
| 15:00 | Faustino 58' | | | Stadium: Estádio do Ferrovia; Referee: Paulo Saturnino |

| Tue, 2 Sep 2003 QF | ASA | 2–1 | Ritondo | Luanda |
| 15:00 | Rasca 18' 52' | Report | 68' Manucho | Stadium: Estádio da Cidadela; Attendance: 800; Referee: Venâncio de Matos |

| Wed, 3 Sep 2003 QF | 1º de Agosto | 0–1 | Sagrada | Luanda |
| 15:00 | | Report | 25' Santana | Stadium: Estádio da Cidadela; Attendance: 4,500; Referee: Muluta Prata |

== Semi-finals ==
| Sat, 8 Nov 2003 SF | Petro Huambo | 0–1 | Interclube | Huambo |
| 15:00 | | Report | 81' Pathy | Stadium: Campo do Ferrovia; Referee: José de Sousa |

| Sun, 9 Nov 2003 SF | Sagrada | 2–2 (a.e.t.) (3–0 p) | ASA | Dundo |
| 15:00 | Beck 76'; Matias 90+2' (o.g.) | | 24' Paulão; 42' Love | Stadium: Quintalão do Dundo; Referee: José António de Sousa |
| | Penalties |
| | Joni (penalty scored); Chinho (penalty scored); Lebo Lebo (penalty scored) | | (penalty missed) Simão; (penalty missed) Milex; (penalty missed) Jamba |

== Final ==
Tue, 11 November 2003
15:00

| Interclube | 1–0 (a.e.t.) | Sagrada Esperança |
|---|---|---|
| Pathy 90+29' | Report |

Estádio da Cidadela, Luanda
Attendance: 3,500
Referee: Muanza Romano

| Inter | Sagrada |

| GK | – | (Democratic Republic of the Congo) Tsherry |
| RB | – | (Angola) Yuri |
| CB | – | (Angola) Kikas (c) |
| CB | – | (Democratic Republic of the Congo) Wetshi | (yellow card) 59' |
| LB | – | (Angola) Enoque |
| MF | – | (Angola) Minguito | | (substituted off) 73' |
| MF | – | (Angola) Nelsinho | (yellow card) 33' (yellow-red card) 69' |
| MF | – | (Democratic Republic of the Congo) Pathy |
| MF | – | (Angola) Sassoma |
| FW | – | (Angola) André | | (substituted off) 89' |
| FW | – | (Angola) Nzinga |
Substitutions:
| MF | – | (Angola) Lami | | (substituted on) 73' |
| MF | – | (Angola) Miloy | | (substituted on) 89' |
| FW | – | (Angola) Yano | | Substituted on |
Manager:
(Serbia) Zoran Pešić

| GK | – | (Angola) Pitchu |
| DF | – | (Angola) Frank |
| DF | – | (Angola) Joni |
| DF | – | (Angola) Lebo Lebo | (yellow card) 19' |
| DF | – | (Angola) Palucho |
| MF | – | (Angola) Andia | | (substituted off) 54' |
| MF | – | (Angola) Bondoso |
| MF | – | (Angola) Jojó |
| MF | – | (Angola) Lito | | (substituted off) 71' |
| FW | – | (Angola) Beto | (yellow card) 46' | (substituted off) 77' |
| FW | – | (Angola) Santana |
Substitutions:
| MF | – | (Angola) Chinho | | (substituted on) 54' |
| MF | – | (Angola) Jorginho | | (substituted on) 71' |
| MF | – | (Angola) Beck | | (substituted on) 77' |
Manager:
(Angola) Mário Calado

Assistant referees:
Nsundidi Armando
Manuel Patriota

2003 Angola Football Cup winner

Grupo Desportivo Interclube
2nd title

Squad: André, Bebeto, Benito, Bobó, Carlos, Chaile, Dadão, Dady, Enoque, Gito, Joel, Kikas, Lami, Malamba, Miloy, Minguito, Miro, Ndulo, Nelsinho, Nzinga, Pathy, Pedulú, Sassoma, Tsherry, Wetshi, Yano, Yuri, Zequinhas
Head coach: Zoran Pešić

== See also ==
- 2003 Girabola
- 2004 Angola Super Cup
- 2004 CAF Confederation Cup
- Interclube players
- Sagrada Esperança players
