= 2019–20 Girabola =

Season of top-tier football in Angola

Girabola
- Season: 2019–20
- Champions: Petro de Luanda
- Top goalscorer: (Brazil) Tony Ribeiro (15 goals)

The 2019–20 Girabola was the 42nd season of top-tier football in Angola. The season was held from 16 August 2019 until 3 May 2020.

The championship was declared null and void due to the 2020 COVID crisis, with no relegation apart from Primiero de Maio, who were relegated for administrative reasons.

== Stadiums and locations ==
Locations of the 2019 Girabola teams

Team	Home city	Stadium	Capacity
1º de Agosto	Luanda	Estádio 11 de Novembro	48,500
1º de Maio	Benguela	Estádio Municipal Edelfride Palhares da Costa	5,000
Académica Lobito	Lobito	Estádio do Buraco	5,000
Cuando Cubango	Menongue	Estádio Municipal de Menongue	4,000
Desportivo da Huíla	Lubango	Estádio do Ferroviário da Huíla	15,000
Ferroviário do Huambo	Huambo	Estádio dos Kurikutelas	10,000
Interclube	Luanda	Estádio 22 de Junho	8,000
Bravos do Maquis	Luena	Estádio Mundunduleno	4,300
Petro de Luanda	Luanda	Estádio 11 de Novembro	48,500
Progresso do Sambizanga	Luanda	Estádio da Cidadela	40,000
Recreativo da Caála	Caála	Estádio Mártires da Canhala	8,000
Recreativo do Libolo	Calulo	Estádio Municipal de Calulo	5,000
Sagrada Esperança	Dundo	Estádio Sagrada Esperança	8,000
Sporting Clube de Cabinda	Cabinda	Estádio Municipal do Tafe	5,000
Santa Rita de Cássia	Uíge	Estádio 4 de Janeiro	12,000
Wiliete	Benguelo	Estádio Nacional de Ombaka	35,000

== League table ==
Pos	Team	Pld	W	D	L	GF	GA	GD	Pts	Qualification or relegation
1	Petro de Luanda	24	16	6	2	41	10	+31	54	Qualification for Champions League
2	1º de Agosto	23	16	3	4	42	13	+29	51	
3	Bravos do Maquis	23	12	4	7	26	22	+4	40	
4	Desportivo da Huíla	22	10	7	5	24	16	+8	37	
5	Sagrada Esperança	23	9	7	7	21	16	+5	34	
6	Académica do Lobito	22	9	6	7	21	18	+3	33	
7	Recreativo do Libolo	24	9	5	10	25	30	−5	32	
8	Interclube	23	8	7	8	24	23	+1	31	
9	Wiliete	23	7	7	9	20	26	−6	28	
10	Recreativo da Caála	22	8	3	11	16	22	−6	27	
11	Progresso do Sambizanga	23	6	4	13	16	29	−13	22	
12	Sporting de Cabinda	19	5	6	8	20	24	−4	21	
13	Cuando Cubango	23	4	8	11	17	27	−10	20 (Note: Head-to-head points: Cuando Cubango 4pts, Ferroviário do Huambo 1pt.)	
14	Ferroviário do Huambo	23	4	8	11	9	25	−16	20	Relegation to Provincial stages
15	Santa Rita de Cássia	23	3	7	13	16	37	−21	16	Relegation to Provincial stages
16	1º de Maio	0	0	0	0	0	0	0	0	Club withdrew

Updated to match(es) played on 22 March 2020. Source: Girabola.com^{[usurped]}
Rules for classification: 1) Points; 2) Matches played; 3) Head-to-head points; 4) Head-to-head goal difference; 5) Goal difference; 6) Matches won;

== Results ==
Home \ Away	ACA	BMQ	CCU	DHL	FHU	INT	PET	PRI	PRO	RCA	RLB	SAG	SCC	SRC	WIL
Académica do Lobito	—	0–0	1–0	0–0	1–1		0–1		2–1	1–2		1–0	3–0	2–0	0–1
Bravos do Maquis		—	1–2	2–1	3–0	1–0	0–3	1–3	1–0	2–0	1–2	1–0	1–0	3–1	
Cuando Cubango FC	2–1	0–3	—		1–1	1–1	0–1	0–1	3–0	0–1	0–0	0–1	1–1	1–1	
Desportivo da Huíla	1–0	2–0	1–1	—			1–0	0–1	1–0		3–1	0–0	0–0	3–2	3–0
Ferroviário do Huambo	0–0	0–0	1–2	0–1	—	0–1	0–2	1–1	0–0		1–0			1–1	1–0
Interclube	0–0	1–1	0–0	1–1	3–0	—	0–3	0–2		2–0	2–0	2–0		3–1	0–0
Petro de Luanda		3–0	3–1	0–1	2–0	2–2	—		2–1	3–0	3–0	1–0	2–0	2–0	0–0
Primeiro de Agosto	3–0	3–1	2–1	2–0	2–0	1–0	0–2	—	4–0	4–0		1–2		0–0	2–0
Progresso do Sambizanga	0–1			1–1	0–1	1–2	1–1	1–0	—	1–0	0–1	1–0	2–1		3–2
Recreativo da Caála	0–1	0–1	3–0	1–0	0–1	1–0	1–1	1–0		—	1–0			0–0	0–0
Recreativo do Libolo	0–1	1–1		2–1	2–0	1–0		1–4	0–1	2–1	—	0–0	3–1	2–0	2–0
Sagrada Esperança	4–2	0–1			2–0	4–1	0–0	0–1	1–1	1–0	1–1	—	2–1		1–0
Sporting de Cabinda				1–1	0–0	3–1	1–1		2–1	2–1	3–1	0–1	—		2–0
Santa Rita de Cássia	1–3	0–1	1–0	0–2			0–2	1–4	1–0	0–3	2–2	0–0	1–1	—	2–0
Wiliete SC	1–1	1–1	1–0	1–2	1–0		2–2		2–0		3–1	1–1	2–1	2–1	—

Updated to match(es) played on 22 March 2020. Source: girabola.com^{[usurped]}
Legend: Blue = home team win; Yellow = draw; Red = away team win.
