= 2025–26 Girabola =

Angola football league season

Girabola
- Season: 2025–26
- Dates: 20 September 2025 – 25 May 2026
- Champions: Petro de Luanda
- Relegated: Guelson FC, Redonda FC and Luanda City
- Matches: 240
- Goals: 510 (2.13 per match)
- Top goalscorer: Dago Tshibamba (18 goals)
- Biggest home win: Primeiro de Agosto 6-0 Luanda City and Petro de Luanda 6-0 Luanda City
- Biggest away win: Sagrada Esperança 0-3 Petro de Luanda Redonda FC 2-5 Petro de Luanda

The 2025–26 Girabola will be the 48th season of the Girabola. the top-tier football league in Angola. The season started on 20 September 2025 and ended on 25 May 2026.

Atlético Petróleos are the defending champions after winning the 2024–25 Girabola season, having won their fourth consecutive Girabola title, (19th title top-flight crown overall) in the previous season.

== Teams ==
The league consists of 16 teams – the top 13 teams from the previous season, and three teams promoted from the 2024–25 Provincial stages

=== Changes from previous season ===
1º de Maio, Redonda and Guelson were promoted from the Segundona, replacing Santa Rita, GD Escolinha Isaac do Benguela and Carmona. In 2025/26 Girabola, Redonda and Gelson made their debut (Redonda was the Segundona champions against 1⁰ de Maio).

=== Promotion and relegation ===
▲ Promoted from 2024–25 Segundona	▼ Relegated to 2025–26 Provincial stages
1º de Maio; Redonda; Guelson	Santa Rita; GD Escolinha Isaac do Benguela; Carmona

=== Stadiums and locations ===
Location of the 2025–26 Girabola teams

Team	Location	Stadium	Capacity
Petróleos de Luanda	Luanda	Estádio Nacional 11 de Novembro	50,000
Primeiro de Agosto	Luanda	Estádio França Ndalu	20,000
Sagrada Esperança	Dundo	Estádio Sagrada Esperança	10,000
Interclub	Luanda	Estádio 22 de Junho	12,000
Bravos do Maquis	Luena	Estádio Mundunduleno	4,300
C.D. Huíla	Lubango	Estádio Nacional da Tundavala	25,000
Luanda City	Luanda	Estádio dos Coqueiros	20,000
Académica do Lobito	Lobito	Estádio do Buraco	15,000
Recreativo do Libolo	Calulo	Estádio Mário Alves Pacheco	5,000
Guelson FC	Kilamba Kiaxi	Estádio dos Coqueiros	20,000
Wiliete	Benguela	Estádio Nacional de Ombaka	35,000
1º de Maio	Benguela	Estádio Municipal Edelfride Palhares da Costa	8,000
Lunda Sul	Saurimo	Estádio das Mangueiras	7,000
Kabuscorp	Luanda	Estádio dos Coqueiros	20,000
Redonda FC	Bengo	Estádio Municipal do Dande	5,000
São Salvador do Kongo	M'Banza Kongo	Estádio Municipal Álvaro Buta	3,500

== League table ==
Pos	Team	Pld	W	D	L	GF	GA	GD	Pts	Qualification or relegation
1	Petro de Luanda (C)	30	22	6	2	63	15	+48	72	Qualification for CAF Champions League
2	Wiliete SC	30	18	8	4	49	29	+20	62	Qualification for CAF Champions League
3	Primeiro de Agosto	30	15	12	3	47	22	+25	57	Qualification for CAF Confederation Cup
4	C.D. Huíla	30	12	10	8	32	23	+9	46	
5	Bravos do Maquis	30	12	6	12	33	30	+3	42	
6	Kabuscorp FC	30	10	12	8	26	22	+4	42	
7	Interclube	30	9	13	8	35	28	+7	40	
8	Lunda Sul	30	9	11	10	24	29	−5	38	
9	1° de Maio	30	10	7	13	29	33	−4	37	
10	Sagrada Esperança	30	8	12	10	34	40	−6	36	
11	São Salvador do Kongo	30	9	8	13	27	33	−6	35	
12	Académica do Lobito	30	8	11	11	25	30	−5	35	
13	Recreativo do Libolo	30	9	7	14	26	37	−11	34	
14	Luanda City (R)	30	9	6	15	21	45	−24	33	Relegation to Segundona
15	Redonda FC (R)	30	5	6	19	15	47	−32	21	Relegation to Segundona
16	Guelson FC (R)	30	6	3	21	24	47	−23	21	Relegation to Segundona

Source: Sofascore
Rules for classification: 1) Points; 2) Head-to-head points; 3) Goal difference; 4) Head-to-head goal difference; 5) Goals scored; 6) Fair-play points; 7) Play-off.
(C) Champions; (R) Relegated

== History of Championship ==
Before the start of the Girabola (Angolan football league), there were major changes such as the broadcasting rights (Zsports), the FAF's (Angolan Football Federation) contract with UNITEL, and the emergence of ANCAF. The championship began with a derby between Kabuscorp and Interclube, which Kabuscorp won with a goal by Sandro. Also in the first round, Bravos do Maquis thrashed (5-1) the newly promoted and historic Primeiro de Maio de Benguela, and we already had one game annulled (Petro de Luanda - Sagrada, which Petro later won 3-0). In the 4th round, we had the 90th classic between Petro and Primeiro de Agosto, which ended with a victory for the military team with a header from Mabilson in the 71st minute at the 11 de Novembro stadium.

In the last round, São Salvador do Kongo and Luanda City faced each other, with the winner securing a spot among the elite in the next Girabola. In a highly competitive match, Filó scored and secured a place for the next season, while Luanda City was relegated back to the second division after two seasons.

Promotions to the Girabola 2026-27

On June 6th, after a 5-1 victory against Marítimo de Benguela, FC Cabinda returned to the national first division championship after 15 years, just as Recreativo da Caála had returned after 4 years. In play-off for the onde FC Luanda, by defeating Sporting de Luanda (1-0), achieved promotion, reaching the first division in a club with a history spanning 91 years. In the final, which too place at França Ndalu stadium, Recreativo da Caála and FC Cabinda drew in normal time (1-1), and which extra time, Recreativo da Caála was crowned champion of the Segundona (4-3) in the penalty shooutout.

== Results ==
Each team plays each other twice (30 matches each), once at home and once away.

Home \ Away	1DM	ACA	APL	BMQ	DHL	DLS	GUE	INT	KAB	LUA	PRI	RED	RLB	SAG	SSR	WIL
1° de Maio		0–1	2–3					1–1	3–1							
Académica do Lobito	0–1		1–1	1–0	1–1	1–1	2–0	0–0	1–1	1–1	1–1	4–0	1–1	0–0	1–0	1–2
Petro de Luanda	0–0	2–0		2–1	2–0	3–0	2–1	1–0	2–1	6–0	0–1	1–0	4–1	4–1	1–0	1–1
Bravos do Maquis		1–0	0–3					2–1	0–0							
Huíla		2–1	0–0					2–1	2–0		2–2					
Lunda Sul		2–0	0–2					1–1	0–3							
Guelson FC		0–1	0–2					2–4	2–0							
Interclube	3–1	1–0	0–0	3–1	0–0	1–1	2–1		0–1	1–1	0–0	0–0	1–1	4–1	2–1	1–2
Kabuscorp FC	0–2	0–0	0–0	0–0	0–2	1–1	0–0	0–2		1–0	1–1	2–0	1–0	4–0	1–1	1–2
Luanda City		1–1	1–5					1–1	2–1							
Primeiro de Agosto		0–1	0–3		2–2			2–1	0–1	6–0						
Redonda FC		1–0	2–5					0–0	0–1							
Recreativo do Libolo		3–0	0–2					1–2	0–1							
Sagrada Esperança		3–1	0–3					1–0	1–1	0–0						
São Salvador		2–0	2–1					1–1	0–0							
Wiliete SC		2–3	0–2					2–1	0–2							

First match(es) will be played: 20 Sep 2025. Source: liveScore, Sofascore
Legend: Blue = home team win; Yellow = draw; Red = away team win.

=== Top scorers ===
As of 25 May 2026

Rank	Scorer	Club	Goals
1	(Democratic Republic of the Congo) Dago Tshibamba	1⁰ de Agosto	18
2	(Brazil) Tiago Reis	Petro de Luanda	16
3	(Angola) Melono Dala	Sagrada Esperança	15
4	(Angola) Filó	São Salvador	12
5	(Angola) José Mendes	Desportivo da Huíla	9

=== Clean sheets ===
As of

=== Disciplinary record ===
-->
