= Football in Angola =

Football
- This is the Angolan Flag!
- Governing body: Angolan Football Federation
- National team: men's national team

Club competitions
- Girabola

International competitions
- Champions League; CAF Confederation Cup; Super Cup; FIFA Club World Cup; FIFA World Cup (National Team); African Cup of Nations (National Team)

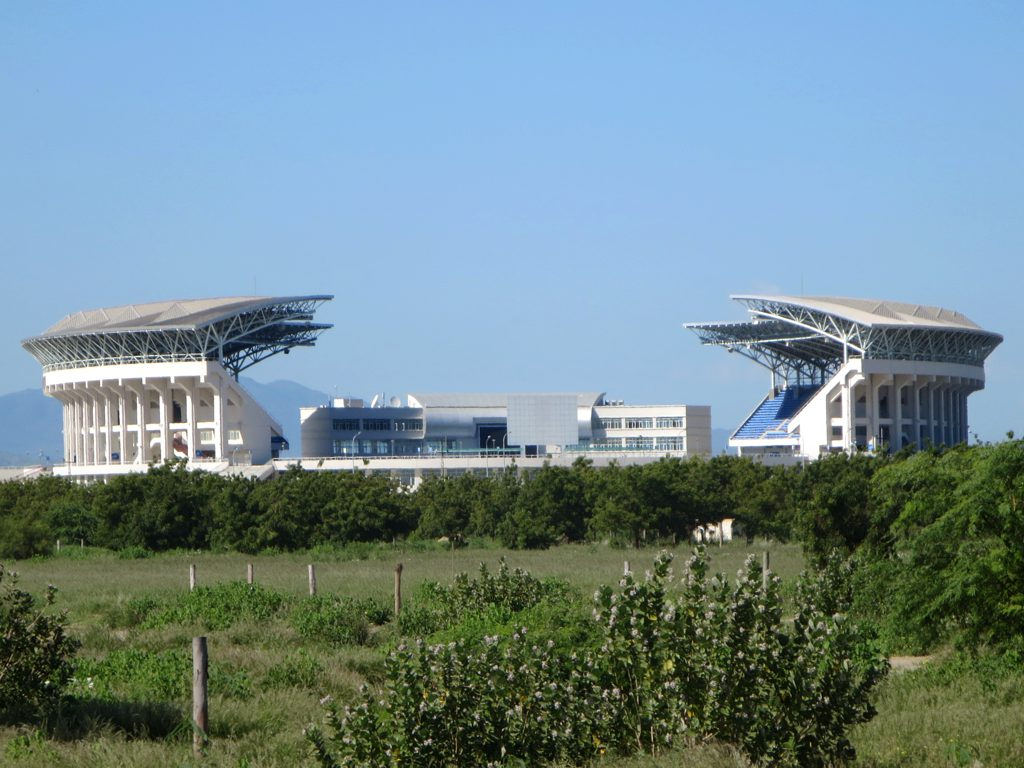
The 35,000-capacity Estádio Nacional de Ombaka is located in Benguela.

Football is the most popular sport in Angola, followed by basketball. Approximately 40% of Angolans are considered football fans.

The national team (m) qualified for the 2006 FIFA World Cup in Germany and many Angolan footballers play internationally, particularly in Portugal and France.

Organized games of women's football teams have been known in Angola since 1993, and since 1995, Campeonato Provincial de Luanda has had a league operation in Angola, albeit limited to the province of Luanda.

The top male national league is the Girabola.

Women's football in Angola is generally suffering from a lack of attention, also through associations and clubs. As a result, there are hardly any multi-faceted league structures, and due to the lack of youth classes, it is not uncommon for 12-year-old girls and almost 40-year-old women to meet in the same game. Due to a lack of training opportunities for women, there is the threat of an over-aging, and thus to an end to women's football in Angola.

Angola was a Portuguese colony since the late 15th century, and so it was the Portuguese who popularized football there. Football in Angola is still shaped by its Portuguese origins and relationships, for example through a number of affiliates of the Portuguese clubs S.L. Benfica and Sporting CP.

The national football association of Angola is the Federação Angolana de Futebol (FAF). It was founded in 1979, after Angola's independence from Portugal in 1975. The FAF organizes the national football leagues Girabola (1st league) and Gira Angola (2nd league) and is also responsible for the Angolan national team of men and women.

The country hosted the 2010 Africa Cup of Nations.

== League and cup system ==
There is currently no women's league in Angola. For the history of championship tournaments see Angolan Women's Football League.

The first national women's club championship took place in 1999, as a tournament in the city of Lubango. The title went to the Blocos FC from the capital Luanda. Since 2005, a regular national championship is being organized by the FAF. The champion of the Luanda provincial championship, the Progresso do Sambizanga, have dominated the women's football Angola with five nationwide titles since that time. In addition to Progresso, the club Amigas dos Mártires de Kifangondo Luanda is one of the strongest teams, although with an ultimately unsuccessful appearance at the national championship tournament in Luena in 2008. The only other competitive teams are Regedoria FC de Viana, and the Clube Desportivo da Terra Nova. Terra Nova is the only club with both a second team and a football school for young women. Apart from these, four clubs remain. The other clubs lack structure, and even talented players often have no chance to progress.

Overall, championships are being held in only three Angolan provinces: in the provinces of Cunene, Huíla, and especially in Luanda. Occasionally, tournaments will also take place in the other provinces, especially in the provinces of Bié, Benguela and Cabinda.

The national championship (Campeonato Nacional) has always been played in each case in a central tournament, but was not aligned every year. Since 2011, no master has been played. The following national championships have been played in women's football Angola so far.

At least since 1965, a national champion is played by men in Angola in a league operation. The record champion during the time of Portuguese occupation was 1953-founded club Atlético de Luanda, holding the championship title in years 1965, 66, 67 and 68. In post-occupation Angola, the Girabola top national league is being played since 1979, and a second, three-track nationwide league, the Gira Angola, is held as well. These leagues include the top league of the provincial associations of the 18 provinces of Angola, among which the other regional leagues are played.

Today, the Girabola still is the top division of Angolan football. It is organized by the Angolan Football Federation.

== Men's national team ==
The national team competed in the FIFA World Cup for the first time in 2006. During qualification, Angola won group 4 over Nigeria, Zimbabwe, Gabon, Algeria and Rwanda. The team was placed in Group D along with Portugal, Mexico and Iran. They finished with 0 wins, 2 draws and 1 loss, they made 3rd place in the group. They did not advance past group play. On 4 September 2006, the African Football Association CAF announced that the Africa Cup 2010 will be awarded to Angola. An extra four new stadiums have been built for the African Championship: the 50,000-seat Estádio 11 de Novembro in Luanda, the 35,000-seat Estádio Nacional de Ombaka in Benguela and the Estádio Nacional de Chiazi in Cabinda and the Estádio Nacional da Tundavala in Lubango, respectively Accommodate 20,000 spectators.

In the group draw Mali, Algeria and Malawi were assigned to Group A. Angola was set as the host group head of this group.

== Women's national team ==
Best rank in the FIFA Rankings for the national football teams was 82nd place in December 2003. In July 2022, they were ranked at 140th place. The only tournaments they qualified for were the 1995 and 2002 African Women's Championships, and their best finish was as semi-finalists in the 1995 tournament.

Angola finished the African Championship third place in 1995. Angola also qualified for the Championship in 2002, where they beat Zimbabwe and South Africa, but lost to Cameroon by one goal. Since then, Angola has not qualified for any other championships.

During qualification for the 2008 Olympics, Angola did not advance further than the first round, where they lost to Ghana. However, they did reach the final of the COSAFA Cup, where they met South Africa, who beat them 3–1.

At the 2022 Women Africa Cup of Nations qualification Angola faced Botswana and lost 1-5 and 2-0.

== Attendances ==
The average home league attendances per club in the 2022–23 Girabola season are listed below. The league average was 658.

#	Football club	Average attendance
1	Sagrada Esperança	1,817
2	Académica do Lobito	1,542
3	1º de Agosto	1,289
4	Atlético Petróleos de Luanda	698
5	Recreativo do Libolo	652
6	Bravos do Maquis	536
7	Desportivo da Lunda Sul	518
8	Sporting de Cabinda	504
9	Interclube	482
10	Desportivo da Huíla	399
11	ASK Dragão	391
12	Santa Rita de Cássia	390
13	Isaac de Benguela	388
14	Wiliete SC	386
15	Sporting de Benguela	292
16	Cuando Cubango FC	249

== See also ==
- List of football stadiums in Angola
