= 2004 Angola Cup =

Tournament details
- Country: Angola
- Dates: 13 Jun – 11 Nov 2004
- Teams: 21

Final positions
- Champions: Sonangol Namibe
- Runners-up: Primeiro D'Agosto
- 2005 CAF Confederation Cup: Sonangol Namibe (winner)

Tournament statistics
- Matches played: 20

The 2004 Taça de Angola was the 23rd edition of the Taça de Angola, the second most important and the top knock-out football club competition following the Girabola. Sonangol do Namibe beat Primeiro de Agosto 2–0 in the final to secure its second title.

The winner qualified to the 2005 CAF Confederation Cup.

== Stadia and locations ==
Locations of the 2004 Angola Cup teams

P	Team	Home city	Stadium	Capacity	2003	Current	P
6	21 de Janeiro	Cabinda	Estádio do Tafe	5,000	DNP	PR	n/a
5	Académica do Soyo	Soyo	Estádio dos Imbondeiros	10,000	DNP	R16	n/a
6	Académica do Lobito	Lobito	Estádio do Buraco	10,000	R16	PR	▼1
6	Águias SC do Uíge	Uíge	Estádio 4 de Janeiro	12,000	DNP	PR	n/a
5	ASA	Luanda	Estádio da Cidadela	60,000	SF	R16	▼2
5	Benfica de Luanda	Luanda	Campo de São Paulo	2,000	R16	R16	Steady
5	Bravos do Maquis	Luena	Estádio Mundunduleno	4,300	DNP	R16	n/a
4	Brilhantes da Quissama	Caxito	Campo da Açucareira	2,000	DNP	QF	n/a
3	Desportivo da Huíla	Lubango	Estádio da N.Sra do Monte	14,000	R16	SF	▲2
5	Desportivo do Keve	Sumbe	Estádio Hoji Ya Henda		DNP	R16	n/a
3	Interclube	Luanda	Estádio da Cidadela	65,000	Champion	SF	▼2
6	Lacrau Army	Luena	Estádio Mundunduleno	4,300	DNP	PR	n/a
4	Petro de Luanda	Luanda	Estádio da Cidadela	65,000	R16	QF	▲1
4	Petro do Huambo	Huambo	Estádio dos Kurikutelas	10,000	SF	QF	▼1
2	Primeiro de Agosto	Luanda	Estádio da Cidadela	65,000	QF	Runner-Up	▲2
5	Primeiro de Maio	Benguela	Estádio Edelfride Costa	6,000	PR	R16	▲1
5	Progresso	Luanda	Estádio da Cidadela	65,000	R16	R16	Steady
6	Recreativo da Caála	Huambo	Estádio do Ferrovia		DNP	PR	n/a
5	Sagrada Esperança	Dundo	Estádio Sagrada Esperança	8,000	Runner-Up	R16	▼3
1	Sonangol do Namibe (Note: Later changed their name to Atlético do Namibe)	Namibe	Estádio Joaquim Morais	5,000	PR	Champion	▲5
4	Sporting de Cabinda	Cabinda	Estádio do Tafe	25,000	QF	QF	Steady

== Championship bracket ==
The knockout rounds were played according to the following schedule:

- June 13 - preliminary rounds
- Jun 26 - 27: Round of 16
- Aug 17 - 19: Quarter-finals
- Aug 26 - Sep 7: Semi-finals
- Nov 11: Final

Preliminary Rounds; Sun, 13 Jun 2004
ASA (bye)
Interclube (bye)
Petro do Huambo (bye)
Bravos Maquis (bye)
Sun, 13 Jun 2004 Walkover
Sonangol Namibe	3
Águias SC do Uíge	0
Sagrada (bye)
Sporting Cabinda (bye)
Primeiro de Maio (bye)
Sun, 13 Jun 2004
Progresso Sambizanga	2
Académica do Lobito	1
Sun, 13 Jun 2004
21 de Janeiro
Desp da Huíla
Brilhantes da Quissama (bye)
Sun, 13 Jun 2004 (pen) a.e.t.
Lacrau Army	6
Benfica Luanda	7
Primeiro de Agosto (bye)
Sun, 13 Jun 2004
Recreativo da Caála
Académica do Soyo
Desportivo do Keve (bye)
Petro de Luanda (bye)

1/16 Finals; 26 / 27 Jun 2004
Sat, 26 Jun 2004 (pen) a.e.t.
ASA	6
Interclube	7
Sun, 27 Jun 2004
Petro do Huambo	4
Bravos do Maquis	0
Sun, 27 Jun 2004 (pen) a.e.t.
Sonangol Namibe	5
Sagrada Esperança	4
Sun, 27 Jun 2004 Walkover
Sporting Cabinda	3
Primeiro de Maio	0
Sat, 26 Jun 2004 (pen) a.e.t.
Progresso Sambizanga	3
Desportivo da Huíla	5
Sun, 27 Jun 2004
Brilhantes da Quissama	1
Benfica de Luanda	0
Sat, 26 Jun 2004
Primeiro de Agosto	3
Académica do Soyo	1
Sat, 26 Jun 2004
Desportivo do Keve	0
Petro de Luanda	2

Quarterfinals; 17–19 Aug 2004
Tue, 17 Aug 2004
Interclube	2
Petro Huambo	1
Thu, 19 Aug 2004 Walkover
Sonangol do Namibe	3
Sporting de Cabinda	0
Wed, 18 Aug 2004
Desportivo da Huíla	5
Brilhantes da Quissama	1
Wed, 18 Aug 2004 (pen) a.e.t.
1º de Agosto	6
Petro de Luanda	4

Semifinals; 26 Aug / 7 Sep 2004
Tue, 7 Sep 2004
Interclube	0
Sonangol	1
Thu, 26 Aug 2004
Desportivo da Huíla	0
Primeiro de Agosto	1

Final; Thu, 11 Nov 2004
Thu, 11 Nov 2004
Sonangol do Namibe	2
Primeiro de Agosto	0

== Preliminary rounds ==
Sun, 13 Jun 2004 PR	Progresso	2–1	Aca Lobito	Luanda
15:00				Stadium: Campo de S.Paulo; Referee: Frederico Cachiquengue

Sun, 13 Jun 2004 PR	Lacrau Army	0–0 (a.e.t.) (6–7 p)	Benfica Luanda	Luena
15:00				Referee: Luís Cazola

Sun, 13 Jun 2004 PR	Sonangol Namibe	Walkover	Águias SC Uíge	Namibe
15:00				Stadium: Estádio Joaquim Morais; Referee: José de Sousa

Sun, 13 Jun 2004 PR	21 de Janeiro	–	Desp Huíla	Cabinda
15:00				Stadium: Estádio do Tafe; Referee: Manuel Francisco

Sun, 13 Jun 2004 PR	Rec da Caála	–	Aca do Soyo	Huambo
15:00				Referee: Figueiredo da Costa

== 1/16 finals ==
Sat, 26 Jun 2004 R16	1º de Agosto	3–1	Académica Soyo	Luanda
15:00				Stadium: Estádio da Cidadela

Sat, 26 Jun 2004 R16	Desportivo do Keve	0–2	Petro de Luanda	Sumbe
15:00			42' Mbunga; 54' Zé Kalanga	Stadium: Estádio Hoji Ya Henda; Referee: Venâncio de Matos

Sat, 26 Jun 2004 R16	ASA	1–1 (a.e.t.) (5–6 p)	Interclube	Luanda
15:00	Milex 10'		61' Minguito	Stadium: Estádio da Cidadela; Referee: Ricardo António
	Penalties
	Rodrigo (penalty missed)		(penalty scored) Nzinga

Sat, 26 Jun 2004 R16	Progresso	1–1 (a.e.t.) (2–4 p)	Desp Huíla	Luanda
18:30				Stadium: Campo de S. Paulo; Referee: Fernando Mação

Sun, 27 Jun 2004 R16	Sonangol Namibe	1–1 (a.e.t.) (4–3 p)	Sagrada Esperança	Namibe
15:00	Minhas 90+2'		59' Chinho	Stadium: Estádio Joaquim Morais; Referee: Eugénio Colembi; Mário Ambroze, Agusto Hulica
	Penalties
	Dodó (penalty missed); Diangani (penalty scored); Minhas (penalty scored); Gugas (penalty scored); Bebeto (penalty scored)		(penalty missed) Nsuka; (penalty missed) Mbala; (penalty scored) Chinho; (penalty scored) Joni; (penalty scored) Beto

Sun, 27 Jun 2004 R16	Petro Huambo	4–0	Bravos Maquis	Huambo
15:00				Referee: João Bastos

Sun, 27 Jun 2004 R16	Brilhantes da Quissama	1–0	Benfica de Luanda
15:00				Referee: Roberto Talaya

Sun, 27 Jun 2004 R16	Sporting Cabinda	Walkover	Primeiro de Maio	Cabinda
15:00				Stadium: Estádio do Tafe

== Quarter-finals ==
Tue, 17 Aug 2004 QF	Interclube	2–1	Petro Huambo	Luanda
15:00	Pathy; Nzinga		Eliseu	Stadium: Estádio da Cidadela

Wed, 18 Aug 2004 QF	Desportivo da Huíla	5–1	Brilhantes da Quissama	Lubango
15:00

Wed, 18 Aug 2004 QF	1º de Agosto	2–2 (a.e.t.) (4–2 p)	Petro de Luanda	Luanda
15:00	Loló 63'; Stopirrá 79'	Report	9' Av.Lopes; 43' D.Caires; (yellow card) (yellow-red card) 55' Tana	Stadium: Estádio da Cidadela; Attendance: 8,000; Referee: Ernesto Tati

Thu, 19 Aug 2004 QF	Sonangol	Walkover	Sp Cabinda	Namibe
15:00				Stadium: Estádio Joaquim Morais; Referee: Luís Cazola

== Semi-finals ==
Thu, 26 Aug 2004 SF	Desp da Huíla	0–1	1º de Agosto	Lubango
15:00			(pen.) Stopirrá	Stadium: Estádio N.Sra do Monte

Tue, 7 Sep 2004 SF	Interclube	0–1	Sonangol	Luanda
15:00	Nzinga (yellow card) 66'	Report	(yellow card) 19' Diangani; 32' Totó; (yellow card) 83' Bebeto	Stadium: Estádio da Cidadela; Attendance: 500; Referee: Eugénio Colembi

== Final ==
Thu, 11 November 2004
15:30

Sonangol do Namibe	2–0	Primeiro de Agosto
Capick 34'; Nuno 83'

Estádio da Cidadela, Luanda
Referee: Luís Manuel João

Sonangol	D'Agosto

GK	–	(Angola) Dodó
DF	–	(Angola) Costa		Substituted off
DF	–	(Angola) Gugas (c)
DF	–	(Angola) Tino	Booked
DF	–	(Angola) Zola	Booked	Substituted off
MF	–	(Angola) Bota
MF	–	(Angola) Capick		Substituted off
MF	–	(Angola) Hugo
MF	–	(Angola) Mateus
FW	–	(Angola) Bebeto
FW	–	(Democratic Republic of the Congo) Kalusha
Substitutions:
FW	–	(Angola) Dady		Substituted on
MF	–	(Angola) Nelson		Substituted on
MF	–	(Angola) Nuno		Substituted on
Manager:
(Angola) Romeu Filemón

GK	–	(Democratic Republic of the Congo) Tokala
DF	–	(Angola) Abel
DF	–	(Angola) Dedas	Booked
DF	–	(Angola) Delgado
DF	–	(Angola) Elísio
MF	–	(Angola) Filipe (c)	Booked
MF	–	(Angola) Sotto
MF	–	(Angola) Stopirrá
MF	–	(Angola) Vicy		Substituted off
FW	–	(Democratic Republic of the Congo) Bhana		Substituted off
FW	–	(Angola) Sting		Substituted off
Substitutions:
FW	–	(Angola) Betinho		Substituted on
FW	–	(Angola) Lucas		Substituted on
FW	–	(Democratic Republic of the Congo) Musumari		Substituted on
Manager:
(Angola) Daniel Ndunguidi

Assistant referees:
Adão Simão
Pedro Canombo
Fourth official:
Filipe Chinjamba

2004 Angola Football Cup winner

Desportivo Sonangol do Namibe
2nd title

Squad: Bebeto, Bota, Capick, Capoco, Costa, Dady, Diangani, Dodó, Dombaxi, Fançoni, Guilherme, Hugo, Kalusha, Luengo, Minhas, Nanana, Nuno, Silo, Tino, Totó, Zola
Head coach: Romeu Filemón

== See also ==
- 2004 Girabola
- 2005 Angola Super Cup
- 2005 African Cup Winners' Cup
- 2005 CAF Confederation Cup
- Sonangol do Namibe players
- Primeiro de Agosto players
