= Igor Nascimento =

Angolan footballer

Personal information
- Full name: Mbanino Igor Samuel de Nascimento
- Date of birth: 19 November 1983 (age 42)
- Place of birth: Angola
- Position: Forward

Senior career*
Years	Team	Apps	(Gls)
2005	Malatyaspor		
2005	FC Haka		(3)
- Bravos do Maquis
2012–2013	Recreativo da Caála		
2014	União do Uíge		
- * Club domestic league appearances and goals

Mbanino Igor Samuel de Nascimento (born 19 November 1983), known as Igor Nascimento, is an Angolan former professional footballer who played as a forward.

== Career ==
=== Turkey ===
Putting pen to paper on a 4.5-year agreement with Malatyaspor at the start of 2005, Nascimento separated with Doğunun Kaplanları later that year.

=== Finland ===
Attending sessions with Haka from the 1 to 7 August 2005, the Angolan put pen to paper until the close of 2005 with them, opening his goal account away in IFK Marieham, finishing with three goals in nine games.
