= Daniel Ujazdowski =

German footballer (born 1991)

Personal information
- Date of birth: 24 June 1991 (age 35)
- Place of birth: Stendal, Germany
- Height: 1.86 m (6 ft 1 in)
- Position: Winger

Youth career
- 1. FC Lok Stendal
- –2007: 1. FC Magdeburg
- 2007–2009: Hertha BSC

Senior career*
Years	Team	Apps	(Gls)
2010–2011	1. FC Magdeburg	12	(0)
2011–2013	Union Berlin II	50	(20)
2013	Hannover 96 II	9	(1)
2014	Optik Rathenow	4	(1)
2015	Académica do Lobito		
2016	1. FC Lok Stendal	5	(6)
2016–2017	VSG Altglienicke	12	(3)
2017–2019	SV Tasmania Berlin	28	(5)
2020–2021	TuS Wahrburg	10	(4)
2024	FSV Saxonia Tangermünde	1	(0)
- * Club domestic league appearances and goals

Daniel Ujazdowski (born 24 June 1991) is a German footballer who last played as a winger for FSV Saxonia Tangermünde.

== Early life ==
Ujazdowski started attending a boarding school at the age of twelve. He dropped out of school at ninth grade. He joined the youth academy of German side Hertha BSC at the age of sixteen. He has regarded Portugal international Cristiano Ronaldo as his football idol.

== Career ==
Ujazdowski started his senior career with 1. FC Magdeburg. In 2011, he signed for Union Berlin II. In 2013, he signed for Hannover 96 II. In 2014, he signed for Optik Rathenow. In 2015, he signed for Angolan side Académica do Lobito. He suffered a muscle injury while playing for the club. In 2016, he returned to Germany signing for 1. FC Lok Stendal. After that, he signed for VSG Altglienicke. In 2017, he signed for SV Tasmania Berlin. In 2020, he signed for TuS Wahrburg. In 2024, he signed for FSV Saxonia Tangermünde.

== Style of play ==
Ujazdowski mainly operates as a winger. He is known for his technical ability. He is also known for his versatility.

== Personal life ==
Ujazdowski is a native of Stendal, Germany. He has worked as a wholesale merchant.
