= Atlético Brilhantes da Kissama =

Angolan football club

Atlético Brilhantes Da Kissama
- Full name: Atlético Brilhantes Da Kissama
- Ground: Estadio do Santos; Viana, Angola
- Capacity: 10,000
- League: Angola League

Atlético Brilhantes da Kissama (or Brilhantes da Quissama) is an Angolan football club based in Viana.

In 2004, they won the Bengo provincial championship, and reached the quarterfinal of the national cup competition (Taça de Angola).

== Current squad ==
Note: Flags indicate national team as defined under FIFA eligibility rules; some limited exceptions apply. Players may hold more than one non-FIFA nationality.

| No. | Pos. | Nation | Player |
|---|---|---|---|
| — | GK | ANG | Mario Gama |
| — | GK | ANG | Matadidi |
| — | DF | ANG | Mestre Geraldo |
| — | DF | ANG | Minguito |
| — | DF | ANG | Mirol |
| — | DF | ANG | Oscar Neves |
| — | DF | ANG | Paulino Pinheiro |
| — | DF | ANG | Paulo 9 |
| — | DF | ANG | Pedrito |
| — | DF | ANG | Prado Paim |
| — | MF | ANG | Quim dos Santos |
| — | MF | ANG | Ruy Mingas |

| No. | Pos. | Nation | Player |
|---|---|---|---|
| — | MF | ANG | Sam Mangwana |
| — | MF | ANG | Santocas |
| — | MF | ANG | Santos Junior |
| — | MF | ANG | Sofia Rosa |
| — | MF | ANG | Taborda Guedes |
| — | FW | ANG | Teta Lando |
| — | FW | ANG | Tonito |
| — | FW | ANG | Urbano de Castro |
| — | FW | ANG | Waldemar Bastos |
| — | FW | ANG | Ze do Pau |
