= 2003 Girabola =

Girabola 2003
- Season: 2003 (Feb 15–Nov 23)
- Champions: ASA
- Relegated: Benfica de Luanda; Desportivo da Huíla; Ritondo
- 2004 CAF Champions League: ASA (winner); Petro de Luanda (runner-up)
- 2004 CAF Confederation Cup: Petro do Huambo (3rd place)
- Matches played: 182
- Goals scored: 369 (2.03 per match)
- Top goalscorer: André (12 goals)
- Biggest home win: ASA 6–0 1º de Maio (25 Sep 2003); Int Lua 6–0 Pri Mai (02 Mar 2003)
- Biggest away win: Des Hui 1–5 Pet Lua (07 May 2003)
- Highest scoring: 3 matches: ASA 6–0 Pri Mai (25 Sep 2003); Int Lua 6–0 Pri Mai (02 Mar 2003); Des Hui 1–5 Pet Lua (07 May 2003)

The 2003 Girabola was the 25th season of top-tier football in Angola. The season ran from 15 February to 22 November 2003. ASA were the defending champions.

The league comprised 14 teams, the bottom three of which were relegated to the 2004 Gira Angola.

ASA were crowned champions, winning a second title in a row, while Benfica de Luanda, Desportivo da Huíla and Ritondo, were relegated.

Mateus André of Interclube finished as the top scorer with 12 goals.

== Changes from the 2002 season ==
Relegated: Benfica do Lubango, F.C. de Cabinda and Sporting do Bié
Promoted: Primeiro de Maio, Progresso do Sambizanga and Ritondo

Locations of the 2003 Girabola teams

== League table ==
Pos	Team	Pld	W	D	L	GF	GA	GD	Pts	Qualification or relegation
1	ASA (C)	26	15	8	3	38	13	+25	53	Qualification for Champions League
2	Petro de Luanda	26	16	4	6	41	17	+24	52	Qualification for Champions League
3	Petro do Huambo	26	14	4	8	34	23	+11	46	Qualification for Confederation Cup
4	Primeiro de Agosto	26	11	9	6	39	29	+10	42	
5	Sonangol do Namibe (Note: Name later changed to Atlético do Namibe)	26	11	5	10	23	17	+6	38	
6	Académica do Lobito	26	9	10	7	19	23	−4	37	
7	Interclube	26	9	7	10	28	24	+4	34	
8	Progresso do Sambizanga	26	7	13	6	20	20	0	34	
9	Sporting de Cabinda	26	6	13	7	27	32	−5	31	
10	Primeiro de Maio	26	8	7	11	19	35	−16	31	
11	Sagrada Esperança	26	8	5	13	25	24	+1	29	
12	Benfica de Luanda (R)	26	7	7	12	26	36	−10	28	Relegation to Provincial stages
13	Desportivo da Huíla (R)	26	6	9	11	18	29	−11	27	Relegation to Provincial stages
14	Ritondo de Malanje (R)	26	1	7	18	12	47	−35	10	Relegation to Provincial stages

Updated to match(es) played on 23 November 2003. Source: Girabola.com
Rules for classification: 1) Points; 2) Head-to-head points; 3) Head-to-head goal difference; 4) Goal difference; 5) Goals scored; 6) Fair-play points; 7) Play-off.
(C) Champions; (R) Relegated

== Results ==
Home \ Away	ACL	ASA	BEN	DES	INT	PET	PHU	PRI	MAI	PRO	RIT	SAG	SON	SCC
Académica do Lobito	—	0–0	1–1	1–1	0–2	1–0	1–0	1–0	2–0	0–1	2–0	1–0	1–0	1–1
ASA	2–0	—	5–1	1–0	2–1	2–3	2–0	2–1	6–0	0–0	1–1	1–0	1–0	0–0
Benfica de Luanda	1–0	0–2	—	1–0	1–1	0–2	0–1	1–3	1–2	1–0	1–1	2–0	3–0	1–1
Desportivo da Huíla	0–0	1–1	1–1	—	2–0	1–5	0–2	0–2	2–1	0–0	1–0	1–1	1–0	1–2
Interclube	3–0	0–2	1–0	2–1	—	1–0	0–2	1–1	6–0	1–1	0–1	2–2	1–0	0–0
Petro de Luanda	0–0	2–0	4–0	3–0	1–0	—	4–3	0–0	1–1	0–2	2–0	1–0	1–0	2–0
Petro do Huambo	4–1	0–0	1–0	0–0	1–0	2–1	—	2–1	4–1	3–1	3–0	1–0	0–0	0–0
Primeiro de Agosto	4–1	0–3	2–1	0–0	3–1	1–2	1–0	—	2–1	0–0	5–1	1–3	2–1	2–2
Primeiro de Maio	0–0	1–1	2–1	0–1	0–0	0–1	1–0	0–1	—	2–1	2–1	2–0	1–0	1–1
Progresso do Sambizanga	0–0	1–1	2–4	1–0	1–2	1–0	1–0	1–1	0–0	—	3–0	1–0	0–3	0–0
Ritondo de Malanje	1–2	0–1	1–2	2–2	0–0	0–4	0–1	1–1	0–1	0–0	—	0–3	0–1	1–1
Sagrada Esperança	0–0	0–1	0–0	1–0	1–0	0–1	4–1	2–3	1–0	0–0	2–0	—	0–1	3–0
Sonangol do Namibe	0–1	0–1	1–0	2–1	2–1	1–1	2–1	0–0	0–0	0–0	3–0	1–0	—	1–0
Sporting de Cabinda	2–2	1–0	2–2	0–1	0–1	1–0	1–2	2–2	2–0	2–2	3–2	3–2	0–4	—

Updated to match(es) played on 23 November 2003. Source: girabola.com
Legend: Blue = home team win; Yellow = draw; Red = away team win.

== Season statistics ==
=== Top scorers ===
Rank	Scorer	Club	Goals
1	(Angola) André	Interclube	12
2	(Angola) Love	ASA	11
3	(Angola) Flávio	Petro Luanda	10
3	(Angola) Jaburú	Petro Huambo	10

=== Hat-tricks ===
Player	For	Against	S	R	Date
André	Interclube	Primeiro de Maio	6-0	3	2 March 2003
Malamba	ASA	Benfica de Luanda	5-1	10	10 May 2003

2003 Girabola winner
Atlético Sport Aviação
2nd title

Squad: Capoco, Dadá, Fefé, Fofaná, Hélder Vicente, Humberto, Jacinto, Jamba, Kadima, Kikí, Love, Malamba, Matias, Milex, Papy, Rasca, Sérgio, Silas, Simão, Suka, Taty, Vieira, Yamba Asha
Head coach: Bernardino Pedroto
