= José Mendes =

José Mendes may refer to:

- José Mendes (footballer) (born 1947), Portuguese footballer
- José Mendes (physicist) (born 1962), Portuguese physicist
- José Mendes (athlete) (born 1972), Portuguese sprinter
- José Mendes (cyclist) (born 1985), Portuguese cyclist
