= Estádio do Santos =

Multi-use stadium in Viana, Angola

- Address: Viana; Angola
- Capacity: 17,000

Construction
- Opened: 2003

Estádio do Santos is a multi-use stadium in Viana, Angola. It is currently used mostly for football matches. The stadium holds 17,000 and was built in 2003.

Santos Futebol Clube plays its home matches at the stadium.
