= Marinho Silva =

Portuguese footballer

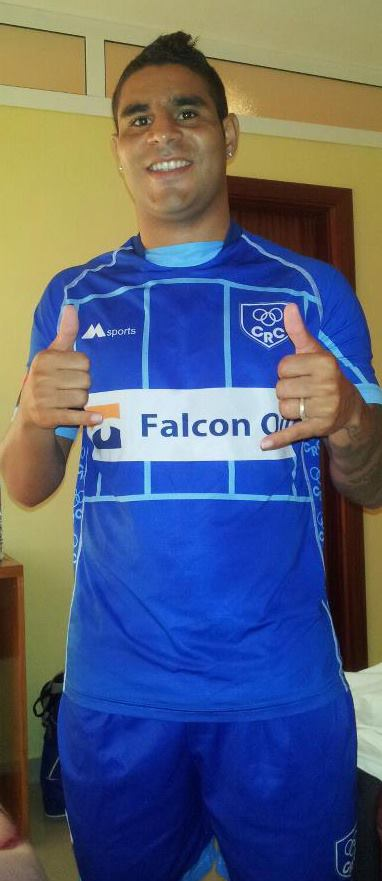

Personal information
- Full name: Mário Jorge Ferreira da Silva
- Date of birth: 2 August 1983 (age 43)
- Height: 1.70 m (5 ft 7 in)
- Position: Left-back

Youth career
- 1996–1997: Barreirense

Senior career*
Years	Team	Apps	(Gls)
2003–2004	1º de Maio Sarilhense		
2004–2005	Montijo		
2005–2007	Barreirense	7	(0)
2006–2007	Montijo		
2007–2008	Amora		
2008–2009	Dunarea Galati		
2009–2010	Eléctrico	19	(5)
2010–2011	Praiense	13	(0)
2011–2012	Recreativo Caála		
2011–2012	Académica Lobito		
- * Club domestic league appearances and goals

Mário Jorge Ferreira da Silva (born 8 February 1983), better known as Marinho Silva, is a Portuguese former professional footballer who played as a left-back.

== Career ==
- 1996/97 INI Barreirense
- 2003/04 Portugal 1º de Maio Sarilhense
- 2004/05 III CD Montijo
- 2005/06 IIH Barreirense
- 2006/07 IIB+ Portugal Barreirense
- 2006/07 III Portugal Montijo
- 2007/08 III Portugal Amora
- 2008/09 II Romania FCM Dunarea Galati
- 2009/10 IIB+ Portugal Eléctrico
- 2010/11 IIB+ Portugal Praiense
- 2011/12 Angola Girabola
- 2011/12 I Recreativo Caála
