= Zoran Pešić (footballer, born 1951) =

Serbian football manager (born 1951)

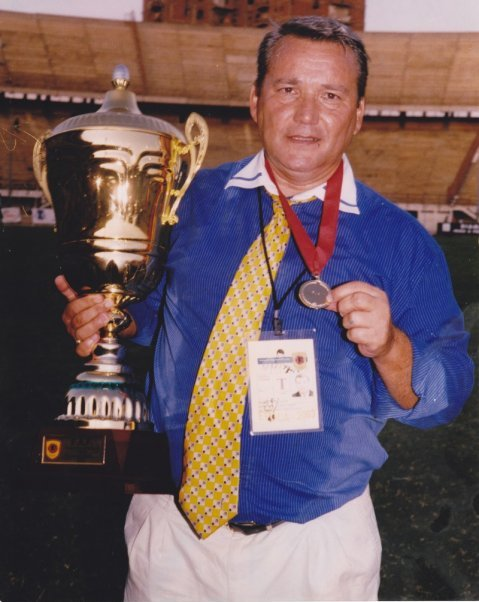
- Pešić holding the 2004 Angola Cup

Personal information
- Date of birth: 9 May 1951 (age 75)
- Place of birth: Belgrade, FPR Yugoslavia

Managerial career
- Years: Team
- 1998: Dynamos
- 1999: Amazulu
- 2000: Ria Stars
- 2001: Manning Rangers
- 2002: Hellenic
- 2003: Interclube (cup winner)
- 2009: Maxaquene
- 2010: Batau
- 2012: Mornar
- 2014: Al-Ansar
- 2016-2017: Al Ansar

Zoran Pešić (born 9 May 1951) is a Serbian football manager.

== Coaching career ==
After retiring as a football player, Pešić began to use his many years' experience as a player in coaching. Pešić coached several African sides, including Zimbabwe's Dynamos F.C. and Amazulu FC, Angola's Inter Luanda, South Africa's Hellenic, Manning Rangers and Ria Stars as well as Mozambique's Clube de Desportos do Maxaquene.

Pešić has coached both Manning Rangers and Hellenic from certain relegation, which has earned him the nickname "The Savior". He was sacked by South African second-tier side Batau after winning only one point out of 5 matches.
