= Augusto e Kafelango Comercial FC =

Angolan sports club

AKC do Cunene
- Full name: Augusto e Kafelango Comercial FC
- Ground: Estádio dos Castilhos, Ondjiva
- Manager: Petronilo de Ortega
- League: 2nd Division
Home colours

Augusto e Kafelango Comercial FC best known as AKC is an Angolan sports club from the city of Ondjiva, Cunene province.

In 2017 and 2019, the team qualified to the Gira Angola, the qualifying tournament for Angola's top division, the Girabola.

== Managers ==
- Petronilo de Ortega (2019)
