= Ritondo S.C. Malanje =

Angolan sports club

Ritondo
- Full name: Ritondo Sport Clube de Malanje
- Ground: Estádio 1º de Maio, Malanje
- League: Gira Angola
- 2012: 9th
Home colours

Ritondo Sport Clube de Malanje is an Angolan sports club from the city of Malanje, in the namesake province. The team last played in the Gira Angola, the Angolan 2nd division championship, in 2012.

== Achievements ==
- Angolan League: 0

- Angolan Cup: 0

- Angolan SuperCup: 0

- Gira Angola: 0

- Provincial League: 2 (2009, 2010)

== Manager history ==
(Angola) Henriques Fernandes	(2003)
(Angola) António Barbosa	(2003)
(Angola) Fortunato Pascoal	(2004)
(Angola) Sarmento Seke	(2005)

== See also ==
- Girabola
