= União Sport Clube do Uíge =

Angolan football club

União SC do Uíge
- Full name: União Sport Clube do Uíge
- Founded: February 27, 2011; 15 years ago
- Ground: Estádio 4 de Janeiro; Uíge, Angola
- Capacity: 12.000
- Chairman: Nzolani Pedro
- Manager: Joaquim Muyumba
- League: Girabola
- 2014: 16th (relegated)
Home colours

União Sport Clube do Uíge is an Angolan football club based in Uíge. They made their debut in Girabola – the Angolan First Division – at the 2013–14 season, after being promoted from the Gira Angola.

The club plays their home matches at Uige's Estádio 4 de Janeiro

== Players and staff ==
=== Staff ===
Name	Nat	Pos
Technical staff
—	(Angola)	Head coach
—	(Angola)	Assistant Coach
—	(Angola)	Goalkeeper Coach
Medical
	(Angola)	Physio
Management
—	(Angola)	Chairman
	(Angola)	Head of Foot Dept

== Manager history ==
(Angola) Rogério Simão		(2013)
(Democratic Republic of the Congo) Moke Adedé Moto		-	(May 2014)
(Democratic Republic of the Congo) Kapela Mbiyavanga	(May 2014)	-	(Sep 2014)
(Angola) Joaquim Muyumba	(Sep 2014)	-

== See also ==
- Girabola
- Gira Angola
