= Wiliete S.C. =

Angolan sports club

- Full name: Wiliete Sport Clube
- Founded: 14 September 2018; 8 years ago
- Ground: Estádio de Ombaka, Benguela
- Capacity: 35,000
- Chairman: Wilson Faria
- Manager: Paulino Júnior
- League: Girabola
- 2025–26: 2nd
Home colours	Away colours

Wiliete Sport Clube, also referred to as Wiliete de Benguela, is an Angolan multi-sports club based in Benguela, Angola. The team currently plays in the Girabola, the highest tier of the Angolan football pyramid. They were promoted to the Girabola after Benfica do Lubango were excluded from the league.

== Players ==
As of 3 March 2026

Note: Flags indicate national team as defined under FIFA eligibility rules; some limited exceptions apply. Players may hold more than one non-FIFA nationality.

No.	Pos.	Nation	Player
1	GK	ANG	Guilherme Muhango
5	DF	ANG	Wiwí
6	DF	ANG	Tobias
7	FW	ANG	Karanga
8	MF	ANG	Mule
9	FW	ANG	Yano
12	GK	BRA	Vinícius Silva
13	DF	ANG	Chinês
15	MF	ANG	Danilson
17	DF	ANG	Giovani Chipopolo
20	FW	ANG	Adó Pena
23	FW	RSA	Abednego Mosiatlhaga
26	MF	BRA	Cairo
27	DF	BRA	Júnior Goiano

No.	Pos.	Nation	Player
29	FW	ZAM	Lewis Macha
31	GK	ANG	Agostino Calunga
33	FW	ANG	Quare
34	FW	ANG	César Cangué
35	GK	ANG	Beny
-	DF	ANG	Noé dos Santos Selano
-	MF	COD	Lema Mabidi
-	DF	ANG	Nelinho
—			
-	MF	ANG	Maranata Vunge
-	DF	ANG	Muenho
-	DF	ANG	Gui
-	MF	ANG	Ningui

== Managers ==
- Albano César (2020–21)
- Agostinho Tramagal (2019–20)
- Jorge Pinto Leite (2018–19)
- João Pintar, Guilherme do Carmo (Note: Pintar was sacked in January 30th and replaced by his assistant Guilherme do Carmo as caretaker manager)

== Titles ==
Taça de Angola: 2025–26
