= Ombaka Stadium =

Football stadium in Benguela, Angola

Coordinates: 12°32′33.9″S 13°27′36.0216″E

Estádio Nacional de Ombaka
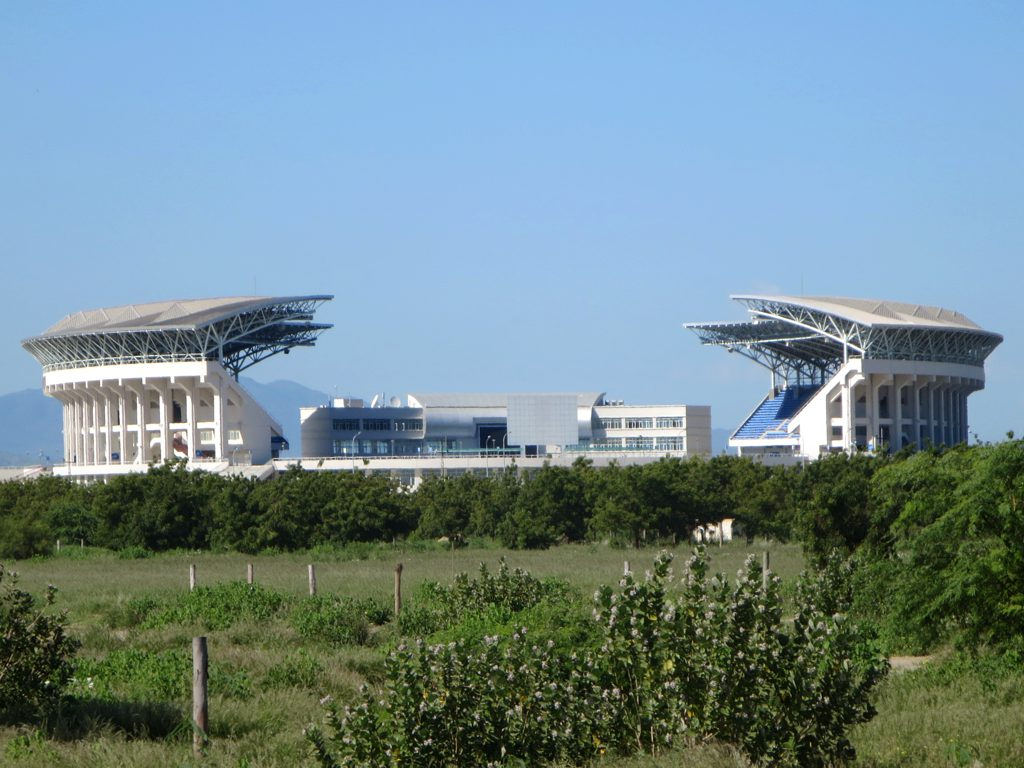
- Location: Benguela, Angola
- Owner: Angola government
- Operator: Nacional Benguela, Wiliete de Benguela
- Capacity: 35,000
- Surface: grass

Construction
- Opened: 2009

Tenants
- Nacional Benguela (2011–present); Angola national football team (2011–present); Angola national Women's football team

Ombaka National Stadium is a multi-use stadium in Benguela, Angola. Completed in 2010, it is used mostly for football matches and has hosted some events for the 2010 African Cup of Nations. The stadium has a capacity of 35,000 people.
