= C.D. Ferroviário do Huambo =

Angolan football club

Ferroviário do Huambo
- Full name: Clube Desportivo Ferroviário do Huambo
- Nickname: Ferrovia do Huambo
- Founded: 1 December 1930; 95 years ago
- Ground: Estádio do Ferrovia, Huambo
- Capacity: 10,000
- Chairman: Adriano Marques Catito
- Manager: Agostinho Tramagal
- League: Segundona
- 2025/26: 2th Segundona (Serie B)
| Home colours | Away colours |

Clube Desportivo Ferroviário do Huambo, formerly Ferrovia Sport Clube de Nova Lisboa, is an Angolan football club based in Huambo, in central Angola.

== Manager history and performance ==
| Season | Coach | L2 | L1 | C | Coach | L2 | L1 | C | Coach | L2 | L1 | C |
|---|---|---|---|---|---|---|---|---|---|---|---|---|
| 1991 | (Angola) Arlindo Leitão | | | | | | | | | | | |

== History ==
In 1951 and 1974 the team has won the Angolan provincial championship.

== Honours ==
- Angolan League: 1951, 1974

== Stadium ==
Ferroviário do Huambo is the owner of the Estádio do Ferroviário do Huambo best known as Estádio dos Kurikutelas.
