= C.D. Huíla =

Angolan football club

Desportivo da Huíla
- Full name: Clube Desportivo da Huíla
- Founded: 7 March 1998; 28 years ago
- Ground: Estádio do Ferroviário da Huíla; Lubango, Angola
- Capacity: 15,000
- Chairman: Gen. Fabiano Hihepa
- Manager: Paulo Torres
- League: Girabola
- 2025–26: 4th
Home colours	Away colours	Third colours

Clube Desportivo da Huíla is an Angolan football club based in Lubango, Huila. The club is attached to the Angolan Armed Forces and has close ties with Primeiro de Agosto. In the 2011–12 season of the Angolan second division, the club got promoted to the Girabola. They play their home games at the Estádio do Ferroviário da Huíla. On 17 April 2006 Agostinho Tramagal was appointed as their new coach.

On 2 April 2012, Mário Francisco Soares Lopes was presented this Monday in Lubango city, southern Huíla province, as the new coach of the second division soccer team of Desportivo da Huíla. The new coach replaces Joaquim Finda "Mozer", who managed the team over the last two years.

== Achievements ==
- Angola Cup:
  - Runner Up (3) : 2002, 2013, 2019.
- Gira Angola:
  - Winner (1): 2004.

== Recent seasons ==
C.D. Huíla's season-by-season performance since 2011:

Overall match statistics
Season	Pld	W	D	L	GF	GA	GD	%
2016	30	10	6	14	29	39	–10	0.567
2015	31	10	9	12	24	34	–10	0.516

Classifications
LG	AC	SC	CL	CC
10th	DNP			
7th	R16			

Top season scorers
Player	LG	AC	SC	CL	CC	T
Bruno, Nandinho	5					5
Chiquinho	6	0				6

- PR = Preliminary round, 1R = First round, GS = Group stage, R32 = Round of 32, R16 = Round of 16, QF = Quarter-finals, SF = Semi-finals

== Performance in CAF competitions ==
- CAF Confederation Cup: 1 appearance
  - 2014 – First Round

== Players and staff ==
=== Squad ===
As of 13 October 2023

Note: Flags indicate national team as defined under FIFA eligibility rules; some limited exceptions apply. Players may hold more than one non-FIFA nationality.

No.	Pos.	Nation	Player
1	GK	ANG	Julião
2	DF	ANG	Aires Emilson
3	MF	ANG	Malamba
4	MF	ANG	Antunes Sargento
6	MF	ANG	Jose Ventura
7	MF	ANG	Mingo Bile
8	DF	ANG	Sidney
9	FW	CMR	Lionel Yombi
11	MF	ANG	Nandinho
12	GK	ANG	Varito
13	DF	ANG	Tchiwé
14	MF	ANG	Medá

No.	Pos.	Nation	Player
15	MF	ANG	Elias Daniel
16	FW	ANG	Gogoró
18	MF	ANG	Milton Suca
19	FW	ANG	José Mendes
20	MF	ANG	Manucho Diniz
22	GK	ANG	Benvindo Afonso
23	DF	ANG	Dino
25	FW	ANG	Pedro Kassadi
26	MF	ANG	Bruno Manuel
27	DF	ANG	Bruno Raúl
28	MF	ANG	Nuno
29	MF	ANG	Cagodó

=== Staff ===
Name	Nat	Pos
Technical staff
Paulo Torres	(Portugal)	Head coach
Paulo Campos Caricoco	(Angola)	Assistant coach
Hélder Cruz	(Cape Verde)	Goalkeeper coach
Medical
Luís Sipilante	(Angola)	Physician
João Jorge António Jojó	(Angola)	Physio
Management
Gen. Fabiano Hihepa	(Angola)	Chairman
João Domingos Adão	(Angola)	Manager
António Tchimbungo	(Angola)	Head of Foot Dept

== Manager history and performance ==
Season	Coach	L2	L1	C	Coach	L2	L1	C
1998	(Angola) Zé do Pau							
2000	(Angola) Arnaldo Chaves							
2001	(Angola) Manuel Artur Manú	1st B						
2002	(Angola) Arnaldo Chaves				(Angola) Carlos Queirós		10th	RU
2003	(Angola) Ndunguidi Daniel				(Angola) João Machado		13th	R16
2004		1st B		SF				
2005	(Angola) António Barbosa				(Angola) Jorge Humberto Chaves		11th	R16
2006	(Angola) Jorge Humberto Chaves				(Angola) Agostinho Tramagal		7th	R16
2007	(Angola) Agostinho Tramagal		8th	R16				
2008	(Angola) Agostinho Tramagal		9th	QF				
2009	(Angola) António Barbosa		11th	SF				
2010	(Angola) António Barbosa				(Angola) Joaquim Finda Mozer		14th	R16
2011	(Angola) Joaquim Finda Mozer				(Angola) João Machado	4 B		PR
2012	(Angola) Mário Soares	1st B						
2013	(Angola) Mário Soares		6th	RU				
2014	(Angola) Mário Soares				(Angola) Lacerda Chipongue		11th	QF
2015	(Angola) Ivo Traça		7th	R16				
2016	(Angola) Ivo Traça		10th					
2017	(Angola) Mário Soares		9th					
2018	(Angola) Mário Soares		6th					
2018–19	(Angola) Mário Soares		3rd	RU				
2019–20	(Angola) Mário Soares							
2020–21	(Angola) André Macanga							

== See also ==
- Desportivo da Huíla Basketball
- Girabola (2016)
- Gira Angola
