= Estádio do Ferroviário da Huíla =

Multi-use stadium in Lubango, Angola

Coordinates: 12°45′20.8224″S 15°45′44.8236″E

Estádio do Clube Ferroviário da Huíla
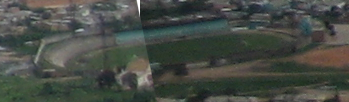
- Interactive map of Estádio do Clube Ferroviário da Huíla
- Location: Lubango, Angola
- Capacity: 15,000

Tenant
- Desportivo da Huíla

Estádio do Clube Ferroviário da Huíla is a multi-use stadium in Lubango, Angola. It is currently used mostly for football matches and is owned by Clube Ferroviário da Huíla. The stadium holds 15,000 people.
