= Estádio dos Kurikutelas =

Stadium in Huambo, Angola

Estádio dos Kuricutelas
- Interactive map of Estádio dos Kuricutelas
- Full name: Estádio dos Kuricutelas
- Location: Huambo, Angola
- Coordinates: 12.75557237°S 15.76248908°E
- Owner: Ferroviário do Huambo
- Capacity: 8,000

Construction
- Opened: 23 August 1947; 79 years ago

Tenants
- Ferroviário do Huambo; J.G.M.

Estádio dos Kuricutelas, inaugurated in 23 October 1947 as Estádio do Ferroviário de Nova Lisboa, is a multi-use stadium in Huambo, Angola. It is owned by Ferroviário do Huambo and is currently used mostly for football matches, on club level by J.G.M. of the Girabola. The stadium has a capacity of 8,000 spectators.

Kurikutelas has been the venue of several international matches.
