= List of Atlético Sport Aviação players =

Atlético Sport Aviação is an Angolan football (soccer) club based in Luanda, Angola and plays at Estádio da Cidadela. The club was established in 1953.

== 2011–2019 ==
Atlético Sport Aviação players 2011–2019

Nat	#	Nick	Name	A	P	J.D.	J.M.	E.C.	S.M.	R.C.	J.C.	José Saraiva			José Dinis				
Nat	#	Nick	Name	A	P	2011	2012	2013	2014	2015	2016	2017			2018	2018–19			19-20
Nat	#	Nick	Name	A	P	9	6	13	13	9	13	^{#}	^{A}	^{G}	–	^{#}	^{A}	^{G}	^{#}
(Angola)		Abdel			FW			34											
(Angola)		Ady									26								
(Angola)		Ady Paulo	Agostinho Domingos Paulo	24	MF	16	16	16	16	→									
(Angola)		Ady Pina	Horácio André Paulo	19	MF				–										
(Angola)		Alex			MF				9										
(Angola)	10	Amarildo	Amarildo Eugénio Augusto Miranda	29	MF	11	11	11	11	–	20	10	^{10(6)}	^{0}	10	10	^{19(6)}	^{2}	
(Angola)		Anastácio	Anastácio Manuel da Costa	33	DF	27	27				27	25	^{7(1)}	^{0}					
(Angola)		Ângelo Lelo	Ângelo da Cruz Lelo Chimpanzo	35	DF	2	2	3											
(Angola)		Ângelo Manuel	Ângelo Sebastião Manuel	30	GK		→	1											
(Democratic Republic of the Congo)		Arsène	Arsène Pongo		MF			35											
(Angola)		Aspirina	Manuel António Pinto Cambila	30	GK				→	12									
(Angola)		Avex	Avelino Eduardo António Craque	31	MF			→	10	10									
(Angola)		Ayala	Mário Álvaro Agostinho	29	MF							16	^{10(1)}	^{0}	→				
(Senegal)		Babacar	Babacar Fall	30	DF					→	24								
(Angola)		Barbosa Ngongue	Edson E. Ngongue	23	DF										21	21	^{25}	^{0}	→
(Angola)	14	Barroteiro	Prazeres Chijica M. Dala	26	DF											14	^{5(7)}	^{0}	
(Mozambique)		Bató	António João Bartolomeu Guebuza	26	MF											23	^{28}	^{0}	→
(Angola)		Bebé	Odimir Abreu Gabriel Breganha	30	MF						–	→							
(Angola)		Bebeto	Abel Miguel Vieira	32	FW		→	10											
(Angola)		Bena	Diveluca Simão Nascimento	33	FW						→	17	^{18(2)}	^{8}	→				
(Democratic Republic of the Congo)		Bissio	Yannick Bissio	23	FW		–	14	14	14									
(Angola)		Bodunha Zola	Mbunga Zola	32	DF			→	4	4	→	15	^{8}	^{0}					
(Democratic Republic of the Congo)		Bokungu	Fiston Bokungu Ndjoli		FW	15													
(Angola)		Borra			MF		23	23											
(Angola)		Bruno Mpulu	Adilson Bruno Mpulu	25	DF											18	^{2}	^{0}	→
(Cape Verde)		Cacá	Edson Miranda		FW				–										
(Cameroon)		Camille	Camille Kamdem	23	MF					10									
(Angola)		Campos Calei	António Campos Calei	27	DF						→	16	^{3}	^{0}					
(Angola)		Castro Cuambi	Manuel de Castro Masiala Cuambi	30	MF					→	8	8	^{(4)}	^{0}					
(Angola)		Chico Bunga	Carlos Francisco Diassonama Panzo Bunga	26	FW							23	^{2(4)}	^{0}					
(Angola)		Chiquinho Nambalo	Feliciano Chiweyengue Nambalo	26	FW	7	7												
(Angola)		Chonene	João Augusto Afonso	22	DF					→	13	→							
(Angola)		Chora Ginga	Fernando Quitanda Ginga	24	DF	20	→												
(Angola)		Da Silva			MF			–											
(Angola)		Dadão Domingos	Osvaldo Marinho Domingos	33	DF				→	5	5								
(Angola)		Dany Sebastião	Daniel Sebastião	28	MF			→	19	19	→								
(Angola)		Daniel Lara	Daniel da Costa Lara	26	FW			28											
(Angola)		David Magalhães	David Dinis Magalhães	34	FW	→	–	→	–	9	9								
(Angola)		Debele	Edgar Elias Hebo Kissanga		DF	4	4	→											
(Angola)		Diabó		24	FW				–										
(Angola)		Dié	Bulay João Domingos Kiala	20	GK	→	22	22	→										
(Angola)		Dino António	Florentino de S. António	26											→	2	^{8(1)}	^{0}	→
(Angola)		Djemba Kiala	Afonso Marcos Kiala	28	MF			31	–						8				
(Angola)	5	Djodjo	Miangaunina C. Djodjo	29	DF										5	5	^{10(3)}	^{0}	
(Angola)		Dudú Jack	Domingos Monteiro Jack	31	DF						→	5	^{9(3)}	^{0}	→				
(Angola)		Enoque Guilherme	Enoque Paulo Guilherme	27	DF			2	5										
(Angola)		Eurico	Eurico Pedro Elange		FW				27										
(Cameroon)		Fabrice	Fabrice Raymond Fosso	23	FW						24								
(Angola)	30	Feliciano Tchissapa	Feliciano Domingos Tchissapa	32	GK						→	30	^{DNP}		30	30	^{18}	^{0}	
(Angola)		Filhão	João Gomes de Oliveira	21	FW						–								
(Angola)		Filipe			FW		–												
(Angola)		Fofaná	Pedro Cassunda Domingos	32	MF		→	20	20										
(Angola)		Fofó	Afonso Sebastião Cabungula	25	MF				18	18	18	→			→	7	^{14(10)}	^{3}	→
(Angola)		Foguinho	Júlio Samucuenje Baptista	22						–		28	^{3(9)}	^{0}	→				
(Angola)		Frank Jimbi	Francisco Barros Jimbi	23	MF										→	27	^{1(2)}	^{0}	
(Angola)		Fundo	Fundo Martins Milukiele	23	FW										26	→			
(Angola)		Gaca	João Sebastião Figueira Gaca	25	MF					15	15	15	^{10(1)}	^{0}					
(Angola)		Gância	Domingos Zaya Nunes	21	GK		30	12	30	→									
(Angola)		Gerry	Nsingui Tino João		MF						19	→							
(Angola)		Geúda			MF						→	26	^{2}	^{0}					
(Angola)		Ginaldo	Ginaldo Figueiredo Manuel		FW	26	26												
(Angola)		Gláucio Bicuila	Gláucio Victor Bicuila	25	FW				→	28	→								
(Angola)	11	Gogoró	João Ngunza Muanha	24	MF										→	11	^{6(12)}	^{1}	
(Angola)		Gomito Fonseca	Nelson Sumbo Fonseca	23	DF		25	25	25	→									
(Angola)		Guelor	Anderson Benjamim	27	FW			→	2	2	2	→							
(Angola)		Gui Matos	Manuel Porfírio Pompílio de Matos	24	MF						→	6	^{24}	^{0}	→				
(Angola)	1	Guilherme Garcia	Sebastião Guilherme Garcia	33	GK							→			1	1	^{12(1)}	^{0}	
(Angola)		Hugo Ndulo	João André Kuya Ndulo	34	MF	→	17	33											
(Angola)		Igor Fernandes	Igor Miranda Fernandes		DF				–	–									
(Angola)		Jajão			MF	–													
(Angola)		Jamuana	Manuel Alexandre Jamuana	31	DF			17	17	17									
(Angola)		Jerónimo	Paulo Júnior Mboma		MF				–										
(Angola)		Johnson	Joel Sebastião Adão Pascoal	26	DF					3	3	3	^{8(1)}	^{0}	→	3	^{18(1)}	^{0}	→
(Angola)	12	Jorge			GK											12			
(Angola)		Josemar	Josemar Baião Monteiro	21	MF						4	4	^{17(2)}	^{1}	→				
(Angola)		Júnior Silva	Carlos Nsimba da Silva	29	DF			→	–	7	7	7	^{17}	^{1}					
(Democratic Republic of the Congo)		Kaniki	Kikanda Kaniki	24	GK			30	–										
(Angola)		Kelly									21								
(Angola)		Kialunda	João Vienga Kialenda	30	DF				→	25	25								
(Angola)		Kibeixa	Pedro Victor Mingas	26	MF										19	19	^{28}	^{2}	→
(Angola)		Lagos	Lagos Francisco Kitenda	31	DF		→	21											
(Angola)		Lami Zinga	Guilherme Zinga		GK	22	→												
(Angola)		Leandro										8	^{DNP}						
(Angola)		Leo Zamba	Leonilde Gongo Zamba		GK			→	–	→									
(Angola)	29	Lewandoski	Kediamossico Victorino	20	FW										→	29	^{7(12)}	^{2}	
(Angola)		Love, João	João Love		MF					13	11	→							
(Angola)		Love Cabungula	Arsénio Sebastião Cabungula	38	FW						→	18	^{13(8)}	^{3}					
(Angola)		Love Miguel	Love Miguel		DF				–										
(Angola)		Lukeba	António Lukeba	26	MF										→	8	^{25}	^{3}	→
(Angola)		Mabululu Paciência	Agostinho Cristóvão Paciência	25	FW						→	9	^{9(6)}	^{1}	→				
(Senegal)		Maguette	El Hadji Maguette Seye	31	GK					22	22	22	^{28}	^{0}	→				
(Angola)		Mamalé	Feliciano Umba Samba		DF	→	14	14											
(Angola)		Manuel Gaspar	Manuel da Costa Gaspar	29	MF	6	6	6	6	6	17				7				
(Angola)		Manuel Miguel	Ndoma Manuel Miguel		MF							21	^{1(1)}	^{0}					
(Angola)		Matamba	Matamba Paulino Sousa		DF						→	23	^{4}	^{0}					
(Angola)		Matias Mateus	António João Matias Mateus	39	DF	13	13	13	13	13									
(Angola)		Mauro Costa	Mauro de Jesus Pinto da Costa	31	MF	19	19	19											
(Democratic Republic of the Congo)		Mbayo	Mbayo Sila		MF			32											
(Angola)		Meda Nsiandamba	Vidal Miguel Paulo Nsiandamba	27	MF	32	32	→							→	15	^{3(1)}	^{0}	
(Angola)		Messias Neves	Messias Pires Neves	27	MF										13	13	^{24}	^{0}	→
(Angola)		Milex	Lúvia João Mateus	32	MF				→	23	23	→							
(Angola)	4	Milson	Milson António Moniz Miguel	21	DF										4	4	^{5(2)}	^{0}	
(Angola)		Minguito Fernandes	Domingos dos Santos Fernandes	34	MF				→	14	14	14	^{18(4)}	^{0}					
(Angola)		Miro Lobo	Almiro Edson Daniel Lobo	34	DF						6	→							
(Democratic Republic of the Congo)		Modeste	Modeste Osaka Ngelenda	21	FW										→	20	^{14}	^{5}	
(Angola)	24	Nanayo	Nelson Candumbo Moma	29	DF										→	24	^{(1)}	^{0}	
(Angola)		Nanga	Nanga João Manuel		DF						–								
(Angola)		Neblú	Adilson Cipriano da Cruz	18	GK	30	→												
(Angola)		Negra	Juremo Filipe Gonçalves	27	MF							24	^{8}	^{0}					
(Angola)		Nelito Tavares	Nelione José Tavares	28	FW				→	16	16	→							
(Angola)		Netinho	Sebastião Emídio Mateus		DF	12													
(Angola)		Nilton			MF		–	–	–										
(Angola)		Nuno Cadete	Gerson Agostinho Sebastião Cadete	29	GK	1	1	→											
(Angola)		Nzinga, Paulo	Paulo Nzinga		MF				–	–									
(Angola)		Odilon	Ngonda Ndilu Odilon João		FW											9	^{6(5)}	^{4}	→
(Angola)		Paizinho Cadete	Magnusson Cadete	26	DF		–	24	–	29	29	29	^{10(1)}	^{0}					
(Angola)		Palucho Garrine	Paulo Alberto Garrine	34	MF						→	27	^{11(1)}	^{1}	→				
(Angola)		Papi	Isaac Maioca Caracato		DF	5	5												
(Democratic Republic of the Congo)		Papy	Papy Lukata Shumu	35	GK			36											
(Angola)	28	Pataca	Bernardo Fernando Pataca da Silva	29	MF										→	28	^{5(3)}	^{0}	
(Angola)		Paz	Manuel Nhanga Zundo	31	MF						→	11	^{7(4)}	^{1}	11				
(Angola)		Pedrien	Pedro António Lucombo		DF				→	–									
(Angola)		Pilola	José Olívio Andrade Pereira	32	MF						→	–	^{(1)}	^{0}					
(Angola)		Quinzinho Silva	Joaquim Alberto Silva	37	FW	9													
(Brazil)		Rachoni	Evandro Rachoni de Lima	23	GK		28												
(Brazil)		Reginaldo	Reginaldo da Silva Belau	32	FW				→	24									
(Democratic Republic of the Congo)		Reginó	Mukendi Mbyia Regino	26	MF					→	10	20	^{13(4)}	^{0}	→				
(Angola)		Ricardo, Oliveira	Oliveira Mulambo Ricardo	23	GK			→	–										
(Democratic Republic of the Congo)		Riddy	Ruddy Michel Etienne Liema Ebengo	28	FW		→	8	→										
(Angola)	22	Rosário			DF											22	^{18(3)}	^{2}	
(Cape Verde)		Rui Faial	Rui Jorge Rocha Faial Delgado		MF						→	19	^{5(2)}	^{0}					
(Angola)		Rui Miguel	Jorge Honésimo Miguel	20	GK					–	12	→							
(Angola)		Sávio	Paulino Vasco Macuva		DF							→			20	→			
(Togo)		Sérge	Seko Atsou Serge	23	MF						28	→							
(Angola)		Sérgio Matusimua	Sérgio António Matusimua	34	DF	–	→	4	–										
(Angola)		Silva Anato	António da Silva Anato	21	MF				33	11	→								
(Angola)		Silva Cussanda	Domingos Silvano Cussanda	28	DF	3	3												
(Angola)		Simba Nguala	Simba Carlos Nguala	22	MF			→	15										
(Angola)		Sucami	João Sucami Nzongo	28	GK						30								
(Angola)		Tomás Nhanga	Tomás Manuel Nhanga		MF					–									
(Angola)		Tomé Pedro	Tomé Osvaldo Pedro	21	DF											25	^{26}	^{1}	→
(Angola)		Tony Osódio	Osódio António Chilembo Pascoal	38	FW	18	18	18											
(Angola)		Toy Kongo	André Augusto Miranda Kongo	29	GK						→	12	^{DNP}						
(Guinea)		Traoré, Seydou	Seydou Ba Traoré		GK				–	1	1								
(Democratic Republic of the Congo)		Tresor, Lubanbalu	Lubanbalu Sylla Tresor	26	MF			26											
(Democratic Republic of the Congo)		Tuabi	Richard Tuabi Kasende	27	FW	17	→												
(Angola)		Tucho	Edson Orlando A. Stok Cardoso	28	MF	8	8	→	→	8	–	13	^{2(3)}	^{1}	–				
(Angola)	17	Vado Dias	Dorivaldo António Dias	32	MF										→	17	^{3(7)}	^{0}	
(Angola)		Vado Kitenga	Osvaldo Pedro de Jesus Kitenga	20	DF			27	→										
(Angola)		Walter			MF			9											
(Angola)		Xavier	Xavier Eduardo Vicente Vunge		DF						→	2	^{19}	^{0}	→				
(Angola)		Yamba Asha	Yamba Asha João	37	DF	→	15	15											
(Angola)		Yanick Landu	Yanick Landu		FW		–		–										
(Togo)		Yawo			MF							26	^{3(1)}	^{2}					
(Angola)		Zaipa	João Canga de Gouveia Leite	28	DF							27	^{1(1)}	^{0}					
(Angola)		Zinho Francisco	Adilson Pedro Francisco		MF	14	→												
Years						2011	2012	2013	2014	2015	2016	2017			2018	2018–19		25	19-20

== 2001–2010 ==
Atlético Sport Aviação players 2001–2010

Nat	Nick	Name	A	P	Bernardino Pedroto						M.Fernandes		J.M.	J.D.	
Nat	Nick	Name	A	P	2001	2002	2003	2004	2005	2006	2007	2008	2009	2010	
Nat	Nick	Name	A	P	L	L	SL	SL	SLC	S5	5	7	7	C	
(Angola)	Amarildo	Amarildo Eugénio Augusto Miranda		MF									11	11	
(Angola)	Anastácio	Anastácio Manuel da Costa		DF						2006	2007	2008	27	27	
(Angola)	Ângelo Chimpanzo	Ângelo da Cruz Lelo Chimpanzo	–	DF							→	2008	2	2	↑
(Angola)	Ângelo Manuel	Ângelo Sebastião Manuel	–	GK			→	2004		2006	→				↑
(Angola)	Ary Alberto	Ary Paulo Gaspar Alberto		MF							→	2008	–		
(Zambia)	Banda	Nephias Banda		FW							2007	2008	–	→	
(Angola)	Bebeto Vieira	Abel Miguel Vieira	–	FW									→	9	→
(Angola)	Beto												–		
(Angola)	Black	Edson António Francisco		MF					2005	→					
(Democratic Republic of the Congo)	Bokungu Ndjoli	Fiston Bokungu Ndjoli	24	FW										15	
(Angola)	Bonês			DF						2006	2007	2008			
(Angola)	Brandão	Nílton Nahari Brandão									2007				
(Cape Verde)	Bubista	Pedro Leitão Brito	32	DF	2001	2002									
(Angola)	Capoco	Luciano José Capoco		GK			2003								
(Angola)	Castela				2001										
(Namibia)	Costa Khaiseb	Costa Khaiseb	29	FW									–		
(Angola)	Dadá	Lutuma Tshiama		MF	→	2002	2003								
(Angola)	Délcio	Délcio Fernandes Vicente	19	MF			2003	2004							
(Angola)	Dias Caires	Yahenda Joaquim Caires Fernandes	29	MF					2005	2006	2007				
(Angola)	Dietho	Isidro Domingos João		GK								2008	–		
(Angola)	Dinho Ventura	Carlos Alberto Ventura		DF							→	2008	–	→	
(Angola)	Elizur	Yamba Elizur João		MF								2008	16	16	
(Angola)	Fefé	Alfredo José da Fonseca Sobral		MF			2003	2004							
(Angola)	Fofaná Domingos	Pedro Cassunda Domingos		MF	→	2002	2003	2004	2005	2006	2007	→			
(Brazil)	Gabriel Pacheco	Gabriel Silva Pacheco	26	DF										–	
(Angola)	Gil Martins	Gil Martins dos Santos	26	FW							→	2008	–	→	
(Angola)	Gilberto Domingos	António Domingos		MF										17	
(Angola)	Ginaldo	Ginaldo Figueiredo Manuel		FW								2008		26	
(Angola)	Gomito Fonseca	Nelson Sumbo Fonseca		DF								2008			
(Angola)	Hélder Vicente	Hélder de Jesus Serafim Vicente	28	DF		→	2003	→							
(Angola)	Hugo Ndulo	João André Kuya Ndulo		MF					2005	2006	2007				
(Cape Verde)	Humberto	Humberto Gomes do Rosário	31	MF			2003	2004	2005	2006	→				
(Angola)	Igor			FW								2008			
(Angola)	Jacinto Pereira	Jacinto Pereira	32	DF	2001	2002	2003	2004	2005	2006					
(Angola)	Jajão			MF										–	
(Angola)	Jamba Pereira	João Pereira	33	DF	2001	2002	2003	2004	2005	2006	2007	2008	4	4	
(Angola)	Joãozinho			DF						2006	2007	2008	–		
(Angola)	Job Estévão	Ricardo Job Estévão	20	MF					→	2006	2007	→			
(Angola)	Joni	Osvaldo Roque Gonçalves da Cruz	31	MF	2001	→									
(Angola)	Kadima Silva	Kadima Adão Santos da Silva		MF	→	2002	2003	2004	2005	2006	2007				
(Angola)	Kikí	Garcia Afonso André		GK			2003								
(Angola)	Lami Zinga	Guilherme Zinga		GK								2008			
(Angola)	Lau Joanes	Ivan Cláudio França Joanes		MF								→	10	10	
(Democratic Republic of the Congo)	Lofó	Serge Lofo Bongeli	23	MF					2005	2006	→				
(Angola)	Love Cabungula	Arsénio Sebastião Cabungula	27	FW	2001	2002	2003	2004	2005	2006	→				
(Angola)	Mabululu Paciência	Agostinho Cristóvão Paciência	–	FW	2001										↑
(Angola)	Malamba Sidónio	Sidónio Malamba Carvalho Inácio	27	MF		2002	2003	2004	2005	2006	→				
(Angola)	Manaia	Valter Américo dos Santos Manaia	29	GK									12	12	
(Angola)	Manuel			DF					2005						
(Angola)	Manuel Costa	Manuel Gaspar Costa		MF									6	6	
(Zambia)	Martin	Martin Daka		DF							2007	2008	–		
(Angola)	Massinga	Moisés Armando Yango	23	FW							2007	2008	23	23	→
(Angola)	Mateus			MF				2004		2006	2007				
(Angola)	Matias Mateus	António João Matias Mateus		MF	2001		2003	2004		2006	2007	2008	13	13	
(Angola)	Milex	Lúvia João Mateus		MF		2002	2003	2004	2005	2006	2007	→			
(Angola)	Minhonha	José Miguel	36			2002									
(Angola)	Miranda Carlos	António Miranda Carlos									2007				
(Angola)	Miro				2001										
(Angola)	Nandinho			MF							2007	2008			
(Angola)	Neblú	Adilson Cipriano da Cruz	–	GK								→	30	30	↑
(Angola)	Netinho	Sebastião Emídio Mateus		DF									→	19	
(Angola)	Nuno Cadete	Gerson Agostinho Sebastião Cadete	–	GK				2004	2005	2006	2007	2008	1	1	↑
(Angola)	Orlando			GK	2001										
(Angola)	Papi Caracato	Isaac Maioca Caracato		DF							→	2008		5	
(Democratic Republic of the Congo)	Papy Shumu	Papy Lukata Shumu	–	GK	→	2002	2003	2004	2005	2006	2007	→			↑
(Angola)	Paulão Alves	Paulo António Alves	35	MF		→	2003	2004							
(Angola)	Pedy	Abel Gongo José Lemos	22	MF								2008	→		
(Angola)	Rasca	Maieco Domingos Henrique António	24	FW		→	2003	→	2005	2006					
(Angola)	Rats	Ambrósio Amaro Manuel Pascoal	30	MF				2004	2005		2007				
(Angola)	Raúl				2001										
(Angola)	Renato Campos	Renato Baptista Campos	24	DF				2004							
(Brazil)	Rodrigo Augusto	Rodrigo Carlos Augusto	21	FW				2004							
(Democratic Republic of the Congo)	Roger Luta	Rogério Bataga Luta	20	MF								2008	8	8	
(Angola)	Sérgio Matusimua	Sérgio António Matusimua		DF	→	2002	2003	2004		2006	2007	→			
(Angola)	Silas	César Muhongo	26	MF	2001	2002	2003	2004							
(Angola)	Silva Cussanda	Domingos Silvano Cussanda	–	DF		2002					→	2008	3	3	↑
(Angola)	Simão Bendinha †	Simão Augusto Bendinha	31	DF	2001	2002	2003	2004	2005	2006	2007				
(Angola)	Stobock			MF							2007	2008	–		
(Angola)	Nsuka Sapato	Domingos Celestino Sapato		DF		2002	2003								
(Angola)	Taty	Kinfuta Kuntima	25	MF	2001	2002	2003								
(Angola)	Toizinho Silva	António José Pereira da Silva		DF				2004	2005						
(Angola)	Tony Osódio	Osódio António Chilembo Pascoal	–	FW		2002				→	2007	2008	18	18	↑
(Angola)	Tumba												–		
(Angola)	Vado Jorge	Osvaldo Fernando Jorge	22									→	–		
(Angola)	Vieira	José Joaquim Vieira		MF	2001	2002	2003	2004	2005	2006					
(Brazil)	Wheels	Wheels Nicolau da Silva	22	DF										12	→
(Angola)	Yamba Asha	Yamba Asha João		DF	2001	2002	2003	2004	2005	→					
(Democratic Republic of the Congo)	Yemo	Momikia Yemo	24	MF					2005	2006					
(Cape Verde)	Yuri			FW								2008			
(Angola)	Zinho Francisco	Adilson Pedro Francisco		MF						2006	2007	2008	14	14	
Years					2001	2002	2003	2004	2005	2006	2007	2008	2009	2010	

== 1991–2000 ==
Atlético Sport Aviação players 1991–2000

Nat	Nick	Name	A	P			V.J.	D.K.	J. Machado		J.K.	D.C.	C.A.	B.P.	
Nat	Nick	Name	A	P	1991	1992	1993	1994	1995	1996	1997	1998	1999	2000	
Nat	Nick	Name	A	P	–	–	–	–	–	–	–	–	–	–	
(Angola)	Abílio Amaral	Abílio Amaral Alves Bento	30				1993	1994	1995	1996	1997	1998			
(Angola)	Arlindo Auboy	José Ferreira Arlindo Auboy	26	MF			1993			1996					
(Angola)	Bass						1993	1994							
(Angola)	Bebeto								1995			1998			
(Angola)	Beke						1993								
(Angola)	Beto Carmelino								1995	1996		1998			
(Angola)	Bolefo †	João Bolefo		MF			→	1994							
(Angola)	Bravo da Rosa	Roberto Bravo da Rosa		DF			1993	1994							
(Angola)	Brito								1995						
(Angola)	Castela		–										1999		
(Angola)	Chicangala	André Chicangala	18	FW			→	1994							
(Angola)	Corda								1995						
(Angola)	Corola	José Francisco de Carvalho		MF					1995	1996					
(Angola)	Didí			DF					1995	1996	1997	1998	1999	→	
(Angola)	Gerry						1993	1994							
(Angola)	Gito			DF			1993	1994		1996					
(Angola)	Hilário †	José Hilário da Silva		DF				1994	1995	1996	1997				
(Angola)	Jacinto	Jacinto Pereira	–	DF										2000	
(Angola)	Jamba	João Pereira	–	DF							1997	1998	1999		
(Angola)	Joni	Osvaldo Roque Gonçalves da Cruz	–	MF									1999	2000	
(Angola)	Kanka	Vemba Kanka		GK			1993	1994		1996					
(Democratic Republic of the Congo)	Keleki	Keleki wa Keleki					1993			1996					
(Angola)	Kepe	Avelino Baptista								1996	1997				
(Angola)	Kito							1994	1995						
(Democratic Republic of the Congo)	Libengué	Otis Monga Libengue					1993								
(Angola)	Loló						1993								
(Angola)	Mabululu												1999		
(Angola)	Malamba	Sidónio Malamba Carvalho Inácio								1996	1997				
(Angola)	Maneco						1993								
(Angola)	Manuel	Manuel Domingos Martins	33	FW			1993								
(Angola)	Mariano						1993	1994	1995						
(Angola)	Minhonha	José Miguel											1999		
(Angola)	Miranda			MF			1993	1994							
(Angola)	Miro		–											2000	
(Angola)	Nando	Fernando Morais	31	GK							1997				
(Angola)	Nando Saturnino									1996					
(Angola)	Nelo Miguel	Manuel Pedro Miguel		DF			1993	1994	1995	1996			1999		
(Angola)	Nsuka	Domingos Celestino Sapato	–	DF									1999		↑
(Angola)	Nzinga	Nzinga Luvusa					1993								
(Angola)	Orlando		–	GK									1999	2000	
(Angola)	Patrick							1994							
(Angola)	Paulo Sérgio										1997				
(Angola)	Paulo Tomás	José Paulo Tomás	30	DF			1993	1994	1995	1996	1997	1998			
(Angola)	Paulo Victor	Paulo Victor	25	GK					1995						
(Angola)	Pelé								1995	1996	1997				
(Angola)	Pumba										1997				
(Angola)	Quim									1996					
(Angola)	Quinzinho			FW				1994	1995						
(Angola)	Silas	César Munhongo	–	MF						1996			1999		
(Angola)	Simão †	Simão Augusto Bendinha	–	DF					1995	1996			1999		
(Angola)	Taty	Kinfuta Kuntima	–	MF										2000	
(Angola)	Tostão												1999		
(Angola)	Totó									1996	1997				
(Angola)	Velho								1995						
(Angola)	Vieira										1997	1998			
(Angola)	Wilson											1998			
(Angola)	Yandá						1993		1995	1996	1997				
(Angola)	Yamba Asha	Yamba Asha João	–	DF									1999		

== 1993-4 ==
TAAG players 1979–1990

Nat	Nick	Name	A	P	Chico Ventura			Z.Š.	Chico Ventura			A.N.				
Nat	Nick	Name	A	P	1979	1980	1981	1982	1983	1984	1985	1986	1987	1988	1989	1990
Nat	Nick	Name	A	P	3	–	–	–	–	–	–	–	–	–	–	–
(Angola)	Adelino			GK		1980										
(Angola)	Afonsinho							1982	1983							
(Angola)	Afonso			DF					1983	1984						
(Angola)	Alberto			GK							1985	1986				
(Angola)	Alex			FW								1986				
(Angola)	Bartolomeu			DF							1985	1986				
(Angola)	Bento	Domingos Bento de Sousa		DF	1979	1980	1981	1982	1983							
(Angola)	Beny	Eduardo de Jesus Benny		MF	1979	1980										
(Angola)	Bernardino										1985	1986				
(Angola)	Bola					1980										
(Angola)	Bondoso	Bondoso Salino		DF	1979	1980	1981	1982	1983	1984	1985					
(Angola)	Bravo da Rosa	José Agostinho Bravo da Rosa		FW							1985	1986				
(Angola)	Bravo II			DF								1986				
(Angola)	Cabral			FW						1984						
(Angola)	Carvalho					1980										
(Angola)	Catarino			DF		1980	1981	1982	1983	1984	1985					
(Angola)	César			DF					1983	1984	1985	1986				
(Angola)	Chico Dinis	Francisco António Dinis Neto	24	DF	1979	1980	1981	1982	1983	1984	→					
(Angola)	Chinguito †	Nelson Constantino do Vale	21	FW	1979	1980	→									
(Angola)	Chiquito			FW					1983	1984						
(Angola)	Coreano	Francisco Teodoro da Fonseca Soares		FW						1984	1985	1986				
(Angola)	Cristo			DF						1984	1985	1986				
(Angola)	Dindinho			FW							1985	1986				
(Angola)	Diogo	João Diogo		GK						1984	1985	1986				
(Angola)	Domingos			GK					1983							
(Angola)	Dudú			FW			1981	1982								
(Angola)	Eduardo Machado	Eduardo Rosa Sousa Machado	25	FW	→	1980	1981	→								
(Angola)	Ernesto	Ernesto Kuntucula		MF	1979	1980		1982	1983							
(Angola)	Esquerdinho			FW				1982								
(Angola)	Fonseca					1980										
(Angola)	Geovetty	Carlos Geovetty		MF	1979	1980	1981	1982								
(Angola)	Gonçalves	Gonçalves Mateus Alberto	36	MF	1979	1980	1981	1982	1983	1984	1985	1986				
(Angola)	Horácio			FW					1983							
(Angola)	Humberto			GK							1985					
(Angola)	Imperial			MF			1981	1982								
(Angola)	Jamaica			MF							→	1986				
(Angola)	Januário †	António Leitão Ribeiro Neto	34	DF				1982								
(Angola)	João							1982								
(Angola)	João Pequeno			DF	1979											
(Angola)	Joãozinho			FW				1982								
(Angola)	Juca	Mário Inácio de Carvalho		FW	1979	1980	1981	1982	1983							
(Angola)	Jujú	Emanuel Jesus de Amorim Baptista	23	DF	1979	1980	1981	→	1983							
(Angola)	Kabukala										1985					
(Angola)	Kansas †	Francisco Sebastião Gomes	24	FW					→	1984	1985	1986				
(Angola)	Kuba	António Kuba	26	GK			1981	→								
(Angola)	Lelé			DF						1984		1986				
(Angola)	Lucombo			MF				1982								
(Angola)	Luntandila	Luntandila Mumessu Pedro Marco		FW			1981	1982	1983	1984	1985					
(Angola)	Maia					1980										
(Angola)	Maló	Avelino Matias Neto		GK	1979	1980	1981	1982								
(Angola)	Malungo											1986				
(Angola)	Man'Adão										1985					
(Angola)	Manelito										1985					
(Angola)	Maninho			MF					1983	1984						
(Angola)	Manuel			GK					1983	1984						
(Angola)	Maradona										1985					
(Angola)	Marcos			MF							1985	1986				
(Angola)	Mário					1980										
(Angola)	Marito	Mário Augusto Silveira Baptista	23	FW					1983	1984	1985	1986				
(Angola)	Matias	Matias António		GK	1979	1980	→									
(Angola)	Meco	Américo dos Santos		FW					1983	1984	1985	1986				
(Angola)	Miguel					1980										
(Angola)	Mizé	José António Viegas Paulo	18	DF								1986				
(Angola)	Moreno										1985					
(Angola)	Nando	Fernando Figueiredo		MF			1981	1982	1983	1984						
(Angola)	Ndisso	Emanuel Ndisso	30	FW	1979	1980	1981	1982			→	1986				
(Angola)	Nelo Almeida	Manuel de Almeida									1985	1986				
(Angola)	Nito			FW	1979		1981									
(Angola)	Nzau			GK		1980										
(Angola)	Paulo			MF				1982								
(Angola)	Pilili			FW								1986				
(Angola)	Pratas	José Luís Pratas			1979											
(Angola)	Rola			DF	1979	1980		1982	1983							
(Angola)	Rosinha	Manuel Neto		GK		→	1981	1982	1983	1984	1985	1986				
(Angola)	Rui Gomes	Rui Gomes		DF	1979	1980	1981	→	1983							
(Angola)	Rui Sousa	Rui Sousa		MF								1986				
(Angola)	Sabino			FW					1983		1985					
(Angola)	Santos			MF				1982	1983	1984						
(Angola)	Saúca	Manuel Saúca		FW						1984	1985	1986				
(Angola)	Sebastião										1985					
(Angola)	Sola										1985					
(Angola)	Tomás						1981									
(Angola)	Tony			MF				1982	1983							
(Angola)	Toy			MF							1985	1986				
(Angola)	Tozé	António José		FW	1979	1980	1981	1982	1983		1985					
(Angola)	Ventura									1984						
(Angola)	Vicente	Vicente Pedalé		FW					1983	1984	1985					
(Angola)	Vieira Dias	Gabriel Vieira Dias	28						→	1984	1985					
(Angola)	Zé Pedro	José Pedro		DF	1979		1981				1985	1986				
(Angola)	Zola	Zola Molley Timothee	31	DF			1981	1982	1983	1984	1985	1986				

== See also ==
- Category:Atlético Sport Aviação players
