= 2005 Angola Cup =

Tournament details
- Country: Angola
- Dates: 9 Apr – 11 Nov 2005
- Teams: 20

Final positions
- Champions: ASA
- Runners-up: Interclube
- 2006 CAF Confederation Cup: Interclube (runner-up)

Tournament statistics
- Matches played: 15

The 2005 Taça de Angola was the 24th edition of the Taça de Angola, the second most important and the top knock-out football club competition following the Girabola. ASA beat Interclube 1–0 in the final to secure its third title.

Interclube, the runner-up, qualified to the CAF Confederation Cup since ASA, the winner, contested the CAF Champions League in their capacity as the Girabola runner-up.

== Stadiums and locations ==
Locations of the 2005 Angola Cup teams

P	Team	Home city	Stadium	Capacity	2004	Current	P
4	Académica do Soyo	Soyo	Estádio dos Imbondeiros	10,000	R16	QF	▲1
5	Académica do Lobito	Lobito	Estádio do Buraco	10,000	PR	R16	▲1
1	ASA	Luanda	Estádio da Cidadela	60,000	R16	Champion	▲4
5	Atlético do Namibe	Namibe	Estádio Joaquim Morais	5,000	Champion	R16	▼4
5	Benfica de Luanda	Luanda	Campo de São Paulo	2,000	R16	R16	Steady
5	Desportivo da Huíla	Lubango	Estádio do Ferrovia	15,000	SF	R16	▼2
2	Interclube	Luanda	Estádio 22 de Junho	7,000	SF	Runner-Up	▲1
5	Petro de Luanda	Luanda	Estádio da Cidadela	65,000	QF	R16	▼1
5	Petro do Huambo	Huambo	Estádio dos Kurikutelas	10,000	QF	R16	▼1
5	Polivalentes FC	Luanda	Campo de São Paulo	2,000	DNP	R16	n/a
3	Primeiro de Agosto	Luanda	Estádio da Cidadela	65,000	Runner-Up	SF	▼1
4	Primeiro de Maio	Benguela	Estádio Edelfride Costa	6,000	R16	QF	▲1
4	Progresso	Luanda	Estádio da Cidadela	65,000	R16	QF	▲1
3	Sagrada Esperança	Dundo	Estádio Sagrada Esperança	8,000	R16	SF	▲2
4	Sporting de Cabinda	Cabinda	Estádio do Tafe	25,000	QF	QF	Steady
5	Sporting do Bié	Kuito	Estádio dos Eucaliptos	16,000	DNP	R16	n/a

== Championship bracket ==
The knockout rounds were played according to the following schedule:

- Apr 9 - May 18: preliminary rounds
- Jun 11 - 13: Round of 16
- Sep 21: Quarter-finals
- Oct 30: Semi-finals
- Nov 11: Final

Preliminary Rounds; 9 Apr - 18 May 2005

1/16 Finals; 11-13 Jun 2005
Mon, 13 Jun 2005
Primeiro de Maio	1
Atlético Namibe	0
Sat, 11 Jun 2005
Petro do Huambo	0
1º de Agosto	1
Sat, 11 Jun 2005
Benfica Luanda	0
ASA	1
Sun, 12 Jun 2005 Walkover
Académica Soyo	3
Sporting do Bié	0
Sun, 12 Jun 2005
Sporting Cabinda	2
Polivalente FC	0
Sat, 11 Jun 2005 (pen) a.e.t.
Petro de Luanda	4
Sagrada Esperança	5
Sun, 12 Jun 2005
Interclube	4
Desp da Huíla	0
Sat, 11 Jun 2005
Progresso	1
Académica Lobito	0

Quarterfinals; 21 Sep 2005
Wed, 21 Sep 2005 (pen) a.e.t.
1º de Maio	1
1º de Agosto	3
Wed, 21 Sep 2005 (pen) a.e.t.
ASA	4
Académica Soyo	3
Wed, 21 Sep 2005
Sporting de Cabinda	1
Sagrada Esperança	2
Wed, 21 Sep 2005
Interclube	4
Progresso	1

Semifinals; 30 Oct 2005
Sun, 30 Oct 2005
1º de Agosto	0
ASA	1
Sun, 30 Oct 2005 (pen) a.e.t.
Sagrada Esperança	7
Interclube	8

Final; 11 Nov 2005
Fri, 11 Nov 2005
ASA	1
Interclube	0

== Preliminary rounds ==
Sat, 23 Apr 2005 1L	Benf Huambo	3–1	Rec da Caála	Huambo
15:00	Vidinho 25'; Isaac 50' 58'		Didier	Stadium: Estádio das Cacilhas; Attendance: 4,000

Sat, 7 May 2005 2L	Rec da Caála	0–1	Benf Huambo	Huambo
15:00			8' Fity	Stadium: Estádio dos Kuricutelas

Sat, 9 Apr 2005 1L	Benf Lubango	2–0	Desp da Chibia	Lubango
15:00				Stadium: Estádio do Ferrovia

Sun, 18 May 2005 2L	Desp da Chibia	–	Benf Lubango	Chibia
15:00

== 1/16 finals ==
Sat, 11 Jun 2005 R16	Petro do Huambo	0–1	1º de Agosto	Huambo
15:00			52' Vado	Stadium: Estádio dos Kuricutelas; Referee: João Bastos

Sat, 11 Jun 2005 R16	Benfica Luanda	0–1	ASA	Luanda
15:00		Report	37' Fofaná	Stadium: Campo de S. Paulo; Attendance: 1,000; Referee: Hélder Martins; Denilson Gourgel, Victor Paulino

Sat, 11 Jun 2005 R16	Progresso	1–0	Académica Lobito	Luanda
18:30	Neridson 90+2'			Stadium: Estádio da Cidadela; Referee: José António de Sousa

Sat, 11 Jun 2005 R16	Petro Luanda	1–1 (a.e.t.) (3–4 p)	Sagrada	Luanda
15:00	Manucho 77'	Report	27' Palucho	Stadium: Estádio da Cidadela; Attendance: 2,500; Referee: Eugénio Colembi
	Penalties
	Tana (penalty missed); Zé Kalanga (penalty missed)		(penalty missed) Lebo Lebo

Sun, 12 Jun 2005 R16	Académica Soyo	Walkover	Sporting Bié	Soyo
15:00				Stadium: Estádio Municipal; Referee: Ernesto Tati

Sun, 12 Jun 2005 R16	Sporting Cabinda	2–0	Polivalente FC	Cabinda
15:00				Stadium: Estádio do Tafe; Referee: Fernando Mação

Sun, 12 Jun 2005 R16	Interclube	4–0	Desportivo Huíla	Luanda
15:00				Stadium: Estádio 22 de Junho; Referee: Ernesto Lotina

Mon, 13 Jun 2005 R16	Primeiro de Maio	1–0	Atlético do Namibe	Benguela
15:00	Benjamim 90+2'			Stadium: Estádio Municipal; Referee: Muluta Prata

== Quarter-finals ==
Wed, 21 Sep 2005 QF	1º de Maio	0–0 (a.e.t.) (1–3 p)	1º de Agosto	Benguela
15:00				Stadium: Estádio Municipal; Attendance: 5,000; Referee: Pedro dos Santos
	Penalties
	Boa (penalty scored); Jony (penalty missed); Lilí (penalty missed) (penalty missed)		(penalty scored) Filipe; (penalty scored) Stopirrá; (penalty scored) Joãozinho

Wed, 21 Sep 2005 QF	ASA	1–1 (a.e.t.) (3–2 p)	Aca Soyo	Luanda
15:30	Kadima 3'		52' Pumpa	Stadium: Estádio da Cidadela

Wed, 21 Sep 2005 QF	Interclube	4–1	Progresso	Luanda
15:00	André 5' 34'; Hélder 74'; Tsherry 90+2'		81' Mendes	Stadium: Estádio 22 de Junho

Wed, 21 Sep 2005 QF	Sporting Cabinda	1–2	Sagrada Esperança	Cabinda
15:30	Tonda 47'		37' Dadú; 90+2' Santana	Stadium: Estádio do Tafe

== Semi-finals ==
Sun, 30 Oct 2005 SF	1º de Agosto	0–1	ASA	Luanda
15:00		Report	78' Love	Stadium: Estádio 22 de Junho; Referee: Belmiro Carmelino

Sun, 30 Oct 2005 SF	Sagrada	0–0 (a.e.t.) (7–8 p)	Interclube	Dundo
15:00				Stadium: Quintalão do Dundo

== Final ==
Fri, 11 November 2005
16:00

ASA	1–0	Interclube
Kadima 83'	Report

Estádio dos Coqueiros, Luanda
Attendance: 2,000
Referee: Domingos Pedro

ASA	Inter

GK	–	(Democratic Republic of the Congo) Papy
DF	–	(Angola) Dias Caires
DF	–	(Angola) Jacinto
DF	–	(Angola) Jamba
DF	–	(Angola) Simão (c)		Substituted off
MF	–	(Angola) Fofaná	Booked
FW	–	(Cape Verde) Humberto
MF	–	(Democratic Republic of the Congo) Lofo
MF	–	(Angola) Malamba		Substituted off
FW	–	(Angola) Love
FW	–	(Angola) Rats	Booked
Substitutions:
FW	–	(Angola) Rasca		Substituted on
MF	–	(Angola) Kadima		Substituted on
Manager:
(Portugal) Bernardino Pedroto

GK	–	(Democratic Republic of the Congo) Tsherry
DF	–	(Angola) Kikas
DF	–	(Angola) Enoque
DF	–	(Angola) Yuri
DF	–	(Democratic Republic of the Congo) Wetshi
MF	–	(Angola) Bebé	Booked
MF	–	(Angola) Hélder		Substituted off
MF	–	(Angola) Miloy (c)
MF	–	(Angola) Minguito
FW	–	(Angola) André	Booked	Substituted off
FW	–	(Angola) Yano		Substituted off
Substitutions:
MF	–	(Angola) Gildo		Substituted on
MF	–	(Angola) Pedulú		Substituted on
MF	–	(Angola) Emílio		Substituted on
Manager:
(Germany) Georg Tripp

Assistant referees:

2005 Angola Football Cup winner

Atlético Sport Aviação
2nd title

Squad: Black, Dias Caires, Fofaná, Hugo, Humberto, Jacinto, Jamba, Kadima, Lofo, Love, Malamba, Manuel, Milex, Nuno, Papy, Rasca, Rats, Simão, Vieira, Yamba Asha, Yemo
Head coach: Bernardino Pedroto

== See also ==
- 2005 Girabola
- 2006 Angola Super Cup
- 2006 CAF Confederation Cup
- ASA players
- Interclube players
