= 2010 Angola Cup =

2010 Taça de Angola
Tournament details
- Country: Angola
- Dates: 16 Jul – 11 Nov 2011
- Teams: 22

Final positions
- Champions: ASA
- Runners-up: Interclube
- Confederation Cup: ASA (winner)

Tournament statistics
- Matches played: 21

The 2010 Taça de Angola was the 29th edition of the Taça de Angola, the second most important and the top knock-out football club competition in Angola, following the Girabola. Atlético Sport Aviação beat G.D. Interclube 4–3 in a penalty shoot-out after a scoreless draw in regular time, to secure its 3rd title.

The winner qualified to the 2011 CAF Confederation Cup.

== Stadia and locations ==
Location of the 2010 Angola Cup teams

P	Team	Home city	Stadium	Capacity	2009	Current	P
4	Académica do Soyo	Soyo	Estádio dos Imbondeiros	10,000	SF	QF	▼1
1	ASA	Luanda	Estádio da Cidadela	60,000	R16	Champion	▲4
6	Baixa de Cassanje	Malanje	Estádio 1º de Maio	3,500	PR	PR	Steady
6	Benfica de Luanda	Luanda	Estádio dos Coqueiros	8,000	R16	PR	▼1
4	Benfica do Lubango	Lubango	Estádio da N.Sra do Monte	14,000	PR	QF	▲2
5	Bravos do Maquis	Luena	Estádio Mundunduleno	4,300	R16	R16	Steady
5	Desportivo da Huíla	Lubango	Estádio do Ferrovia	15,000	SF	R16	▼2
5	Domant FC	Caxito	Estádio Municipal	5,000	DNP	R16	n/a
6	Estrela José Sita	Cabinda	Estádio do Tafe	25,000	DNP	PR	n/a
6	FC Cabinda	Cabinda	Estádio do Tafe	25,000	DNP	PR	n/a
2	Interclube	Luanda	Estádio 22 de Junho	7,000	QF	Runner-Up	▲2
5	Kabuscorp	Luanda	Estádio dos Coqueiros	8,000	R16	R16	Steady
5	Petro de Luanda	Luanda	Estádio da Cidadela	50,000	QF	R16	▼1
6	Porcelana FC	N'dalatando	Municipal Santos Diniz	5,000	DNP	PR	n/a
4	Primeiro de Agosto	Luanda	Estádio da Cidadela	50,000	Champion	QF	▼4
5	Progresso	Luanda	Estádio dos Coqueiros	8,000	PR	R16	▲1
5	Rec da Caála	Huambo	Estádio do Ferrovia	10,000	QF	R16	▼1
6	Rec do Chingo	Sumbe	Estádio Municipal	–	DNP	PR	n/a
3	Recreativo do Libolo	Calulo	Estádio Municipal de Calulo	10,000	R16	SF	▲2
3	Sagrada Esperança	Dundo	Estádio Sagrada Esperança	8,000	Runner-Up	SF	▼1
4	Santos FC	Luanda	Estádio dos Coqueiros	8,000	QF	QF	Steady
5	Sporting de Cabinda	Cabinda	Estádio do Tafe	25,000	DNP	R16	n/a

== Championship bracket ==
Preliminary Rounds; 16 Jun 2010
Wed, 23 Jun 2010
Baixa Cassanje	1
ASA	2
Wed, 16 Jun 2010 Walkover
Domant FC	3
FC Cabinda	0
Petro Luanda (bye)
Benfica Lubango (bye)
Sagrada (bye)
Wed, 16 Jun 2010
Benfica Luanda	3
Progresso	5
Wed, 16 Jun 2010
Sporting Cabinda	5
Estrela José Sita	1
Santos FC (bye)
Académica Soyo (bye)
Wed, 16 Jun 2010
Rec da Caála	4
Porcelana FC	0
Kabuscorp (bye)
Rec do Libolo (bye)
Desportivo Huíla (bye)
Wed, 16 Jun 2010
Rec do Chingo	0
Interclube	2
1º de Agosto (bye)
Bravos Maquis (bye)

1/16 Finals; 3 Jul 2010
Sun, 4 Jul 2010
ASA	4
Domant FC	1
Sat, 3 Jul 2010
Petro Luanda	1
Benfica Lubango	2
Fri, 2 Jul 2010
Sagrada	2
Progresso	1
Sat, 3 Jul 2010 (pen)
Sporting Cabinda	3
Santos FC	4
Sat, 3 Jul 2010
Académica Soyo	2
Rec da Caála	1
Sun, 4 Jul 2010
Kabuscorp	0
Rec do Libolo	1
Sun, 4 Jul 2010 (pen)
Desportivo Huíla	4
Interclube	5
Sat, 3 Jul 2010
1º de Agosto	2
Bravos Maquis	0

Quarterfinals; Wed, 29 Sep 2010
Wed, 29 Sep 2010 Walkover
ASA	3
Benfica Lubango	0
Thu, 29 Jul 2010 (pen)
Sagrada	6
Santos FC	5
Wed, 29 Sep 2010 (pen)
Académica Soyo	4
Rec do Libolo	5
Wed, 29 Sep 2010 (pen)
Interclube	5
1º de Agosto	3

Semifinals; Wed, 3 Nov 2010
Wed, 3 Nov 2010
ASA	2
Sagrada	1
Wed, 3 Nov 2010
Rec do Libolo	0
Interclube	3

Final; Fri, 11 Nov 2011
Fri, 11 Nov 2010 (pen)
ASA	4
Interclube	3

== Preliminary rounds ==
Wed, 23 Jun 2010 PR	Baixa Cassanje	1–2	ASA	Malanje
15:00 WAT (UTC+1)

Wed, 16 Jun 2010 PR	Domant FC	Walkover	FC Cabinda	Caxito
15:00 WAT (UTC+1)				Stadium: Municipal do Dande

Wed, 16 Jun 2010 PR	Benfica Luanda	3–5	Progresso	Luanda
15:00 WAT (UTC+1)

Wed, 16 Jun 2010 PR	Sporting Cabinda	5–1	Estrela José Sita	Cabinda
15:00 WAT (UTC+1)

Wed, 16 Jun 2010 PR	Rec da Caála	4–0	Porcelana FC	Caála
15:00 WAT (UTC+1)

Wed, 16 Jun 2010 PR	Rec do Chingo	0–2	Interclube	Sumbe
15:00 WAT (UTC+1)

== Round of 16 ==
Sun, 4 Jul 2010 R16	ASA	4–1	Domant FC	Luanda
15:00 WAT (UTC+1)

Sat, 3 Jul 2010 R16	Benfica Lubango	2–1	Petro Luanda	Lubango
15:00 WAT (UTC+1)	Soares 21'; Filipe (yellow card) 45' (goal) 61'	Report	15' Santana	Stadium: Estádio do Ferrovia; Attendance: 2.000; Referee: António Cachala; Eurico Vicesse, Miguel Lovombo

Fri, 2 Jul 2010 R16	Sagrada	2–1	Progresso	Dundo
15:00 WAT (UTC+1)				Stadium: Sagrada Esperança

Sat, 3 Jul 2010 R16	Sporting Cabinda	0–0 (a.e.t.) (3–4 p)	Santos FC	Cabinda
15:00 WAT (UTC+1)

Sat, 3 Jul 2010 R16	Académica Soyo	2–1	Rec da Caála	Soyo
15:00 WAT (UTC+1)

Sun, 4 Jul 2010 R16	Kabuscorp	0–1	Rec do Libolo	Luanda
15:00 WAT (UTC+1)			79' Gomito	Stadium: Coqueiros

Sun, 4 Jul 2010 R16	Desportivo Huíla	1–1 (a.e.t.) (4–5 p)	Interclube	Lubango
16:00 WAT (UTC+1)	Zinho (yellow card) (yellow-red card) 10'; Jadó 73'		(yellow card) Zé Augusto; 90' (pen.) P.Henriques	Stadium: Estádio do Ferrovia; Referee: João Bastos

Sat, 3 Jul 2010 R16	1º de Agosto	2–0	Bravos Maquis	Luanda
15:00 WAT (UTC+1)	Mingo Bile 44'; Stélvio 90+'			Stadium: Cidadela

== Quarter-finals ==
Wed, 29 Sep 2010 QF	ASA	Walkover	Benfica Lubango	Luanda
15:00 WAT (UTC+1)		Report

Thu, 29 Jul 2010 QF	Sagrada	1–1 (a.e.t.) (6–5 p)	Santos FC	Dundo
15:00 WAT (UTC+1)	Djo 30'		28' Zezão	Stadium: Sagrada Esperança; Attendance: 7.000
	Penalties
			(penalty missed) C.Caputo

Wed, 29 Sep 2010 QF	Académica Soyo	0–0 (a.e.t.) (4–5 p)	Rec do Libolo	Soyo
15:00 WAT (UTC+1)				Stadium: Estádio dos Imbondeiros

Wed, 29 Sep 2010 QF	Interclube	0–0 (a.e.t.) (5–3 p)	1º de Agosto	Luanda
15:00 WAT (UTC+1)	Zé Augusto (yellow card); Fabrício (yellow card); Pingo (yellow card); Messi (yellow card)	Report	(yellow card) Dani; (yellow card) Bena	Stadium: 22 de Junho; Attendance: 5.000; Referee: Paulo Talaia; Ricardo Daniel, Joaquim Tchingo
	Penalties
	(penalty scored) (penalty scored) (penalty scored) (penalty scored); Tsherry (penalty scored)		(penalty scored) (penalty scored) (penalty scored); (penalty missed) Bena

== Semi-finals ==
Wed, 3 Nov 2010 SF	ASA	2–1	Sagrada	Luanda
15:00 WAT (UTC+1)	Chinguila (o.g.); Bokungu		Lucas	Stadium: Cidadela

Wed, 3 Nov 2010 SF	Rec do Libolo	0–3	Interclube	Calulo
15:00 WAT (UTC+1)				Stadium: Patrice Lumumba

== Final ==
11 November 2010
16:00

ASA	0–0 (a.e.t.)	Interclube
	Report
Penalties
Bokungu (penalty scored); Lau (penalty missed); Anastácio (penalty missed); Nuno (penalty scored); Jamba (penalty scored); Papy (penalty scored)	4–3	(penalty scored) P.Henriques; (penalty scored) Capuco; (penalty scored) Joel; (penalty missed) Nari; (penalty missed) Tsherry; (penalty missed) Diop

Estádio da Cidadela, Luanda
Referee: Hélder Martins

ASA	Interclube

GK	1	(Angola) Nuno
RB	3	(Angola) Silva (c)
CB	2	(Angola) Ângelo	(substituted off) 90'
CB	5	(Angola) Papy
LB	27	(Angola) Anastácio
RM	6	(Angola) Manuel
CM	13	(Angola) Matias
CM	14	(Angola) Zinho	(substituted off) 73'
LM	–	(Angola) Jajão
CF	15	(Democratic Republic of the Congo) Bokungu
CF	18	(Angola) Tony Osódio	(substituted off) 60'
Substitutions:
MF	11	(Angola) Amarildo	(substituted on) 60'
MF	10	(Angola) Lau	(substituted on) 73'
DF	4	(Angola) Jamba	(substituted on) 90'
Manager:
(Portugal) José Dinis

GK	1	(Democratic Republic of the Congo) Tsherry
RB	–	(Angola) Pingo	(yellow card) 40'
CB	4	(Angola) Fabrício	(yellow card) 68'
CB	6	(Angola) Joel
LB	3	(Angola) Fissy
RM	29	(Cameroon) Daniel
CM	18	(Angola) Paty		(substituted off) 90+'
CM	23	(Angola) Nari
LM	24	(Angola) Mingo		Substituted off
CF	31	(Cameroon) Messi		(substituted off) 70'
CF	32	(Angola) Pedro Henriques (c)
Substitutions:
CF	9	(Angola) Manucho		(substituted on) 70'
CF	–	(Senegal) Diop		(substituted on) 90+'
MF	11	(Angola) Capuco		Substituted on
Manager:
(Portugal) Álvaro Magalhães

Assistant referees:
Denilson Gourgel
Victor Paulino

2010 Angola Football Cup winner

3rd title

Squad:
Manaia, Neblú, Nuno (GK)
Anastácio, Ângelo, Jamba, Netinho, Papy, Silva, Wheels (DF)
Amarildo, Elizur, Gilberto, Jajão, Lau, Manuel, Matias, Roger, Zinho (MF)
Bebeto, Bokungu, Ginaldo, Massinga, Tony Osódio, (FW)
José Dinis (Head Coach)

== See also ==
- 2010 Girabola
- 2011 Angola Super Cup
- 2011 CAF Confederation Cup
- ASA players
- Interclube players
