= 2004 Girabola =

Girabola 2004
- Season: 2004 (Feb 15–Nov 06)
- Champions: ASA
- Relegated: Académica do Soyo; Benfica do Lubango; Bravos do Maquis
- 2005 CAF Champions League: ASA (Girabola winner); Sagrada Esperança (Girabola runner-up)
- 2005 CAF Confederation Cup: Interclube (Girabola 3rd place)
- Matches played: 182
- Goals scored: 396 (2.18 per match)
- Top goalscorer: Love Kabungula (17 goals)
- Biggest home win: ASA 8–1 Pri Ago (26 May 2004)
- Biggest away win: Bra Maq 0–4 ASA (11 Apr 2004)
- Highest scoring: ASA 8–1 Pri Ago (26 May 2004)
- Longest winning run: Interclube (5) 22 Aug - 17 Oct; Petro Luanda (5) 17 Apr - 26 May
- Longest unbeaten run: Sag Esperança (17) 02 May - 06 Nov
- Longest winless run: Bravos Maquis (11) 01 Aug - 06 Nov
- Longest losing run: Bravos Maquis (11) 01 Aug - 06 Nov

The 2004 Girabola was the 26th season of top-tier football in Angola. The season ran from 15 February to 6 November 2004. ASA were the defending champions.

The league comprised 14 teams, the bottom three of which were relegated to the 2005 Gira Angola.

ASA were crowned champions, winning a third title in a row, while Académica do Soyo, Benfica do Lubango and Bravos do Maquis, the three clubs that were promoted that same season, were relegated.

Arsénio Kabungula aka Love of ASA finished as the top scorer with 17 goals.

== Changes from the 2004 season ==
Relegated: Benfica de Luanda, Desportivo da Huíla and Ritondo
Promoted: Académica do Soyo, Benfica do Lubango and Bravos do Maquis

Locations of the 2004 Girabola teams

== League table ==
Pos	Team	Pld	W	D	L	GF	GA	GD	Pts	Qualification or relegation
1	ASA (C)	26	16	8	2	53	13	+40	56	Qualification for Champions League
2	Sagrada Esperança	26	15	8	3	32	10	+22	53	Qualification for Champions League
3	Interclube	26	15	6	5	36	21	+15	51	Qualification for Confederation Cup
4	Petro de Luanda	26	13	9	4	41	18	+23	48	
5	Sonangol do Namibe (Note: Name later changed to Atlético do Namibe)	26	7	12	7	32	28	+4	33	
6	Primeiro de Agosto	26	9	6	11	21	29	−8	33	
7	Petro do Huambo	26	8	7	11	27	36	−9	31	
8	Primeiro de Maio	26	8	7	11	20	33	−13	31	
9	Sporting de Cabinda	26	6	12	8	30	31	−1	30	
10	Académica do Lobito	26	7	9	10	28	31	−3	30	
11	Progresso do Sambizanga	26	6	12	8	22	26	−4	30	
12	Académica do Soyo (R)	26	6	10	10	22	32	−10	28	Relegation to Provincial stages
13	Benfica do Lubango (R)	26	6	8	12	22	33	−11	26	Relegation to Provincial stages
14	Bravos do Maquis (R)	26	2	2	22	10	55	−45	8	Relegation to Provincial stages

Updated to match(es) played on 15 November 2004. Source: Girabola.com
Rules for classification: 1) Points; 2) Head-to-head points; 3) Head-to-head goal difference; 4) Goal difference; 5) Goals scored; 6) Fair-play points; 7) Play-off.
(C) Champions; (R) Relegated

== Results ==
Home \ Away	ACL	ACS	ASA	BLB	BRA	INT	PET	PHU	PRI	MAI	PRO	SAG	SON	SCC
Académica do Lobito	—	4–3	0–1	2–1	6–0	0–1	0–2	0–2	2–0	1–2	0–0	0–0	0–0	1–1
Académica do Soyo	1–2	—	2–0	1–0	1–1	0–1	1–1	0–0	0–3	1–1	1–0	1–1	2–1	0–0
ASA	4–1	2–0	—	3–0	4–1	0–0	1–1	4–1	8–1	6–0	2–0	2–1	2–0	3–0
Benfica do Lubango	0–2	1–1	1–1	—	2–0	1–4	0–0	3–1	2–1	0–1	3–0	0–1	1–1	1–0
Bravos do Maquis	0–1	0–2	0–4	0–1	—	1–2	0–3	2–1	0–2	0–1	1–3	0–1	0–2	1–1
Interclube	0–0	1–0	2–0	2–0	4–0	—	1–4	2–1	0–1	1–0	1–0	0–0	2–1	3–2
Petro de Luanda	2–2	3–0	0–1	1–0	2–0	2–0	—	2–0	2–0	3–0	0–1	0–0	2–0	2–2
Petro do Huambo	1–1	3–0	1–1	3–3	1–0	3–2	1–0	—	1–0	0–1	0–2	0–3	1–1	1–1
Primeiro de Agosto	1–0	0–1	0–1	0–0	1–0	1–0	2–2	0–2	—	1–0	0–0	0–1	1–3	1–0
Primeiro de Maio	1–0	0–0	0–2	3–0	1–2	1–3	2–2	0–1	2–1	—	1–0	0–2	0–0	1–2
Progresso do Sambizanga	1–1	2–2	0–0	1–0	2–1	1–1	0–0	1–1	0–0	0–0	—	1–2	1–1	3–3
Sagrada Esperança	2–1	2–0	1–1	2–0	1–0	0–0	1–2	2–0	0–0	3–0	2–0	—	2–1	2–0
Sonangol do Namibe	4–0	2–1	0–0	1–1	3–0	2–2	0–2	2–1	1–1	1–1	2–3	0–0	—	3–2
Sporting de Cabinda	1–1	1–1	0–0	1–1	3–0	0–1	3–1	3–0	1–3	1–1	1–0	1–0	0–0	—

Updated to match(es) played on 6 November 2004. Source: girabola.com
Legend: Blue = home team win; Yellow = draw; Red = away team win.

Schedule and results
ASA; 1st	15 Feb (h); 3–0 LUB	22 Feb (a); SON 0–0	29 Feb (h); 3–0 SCC	03 Mar (a); MAI 0–2	20 Mar (a); PRO 0–0	04 Apr (h); 1–1 PET	11 Apr (a); MAQ 0–4	17 Apr (h); 2–1 SAG	21 Apr (a); SOY 2–0	2 May (h); 4–1 ACL	16 May (a); INT 2–0	26 May (h); 8–1 PRI	30 May (a); PHU 1–1
ASA; 1st	11 Jul (a); LUB 1–1	25 Jul (h); 2–0 SON	01 Aug (a); SCC 0–0	08 Aug (h); 6–0 MAI	14 Aug (h); 2–0 PRO	22 Aug (a); PET 0–1	11 Sep (h); 4–1 MAQ	25 Sep (a); SAG 1–1	02 Oct (h); 2–0 SOY	17 Oct (a); ACL 0–1	23 Oct (h); 0–0 INT	30 Oct (a); PRI 0–1	06 Nov (h); 4–1 PHU
SAG ESP; 2nd	15 Feb (h); 0–0 INT	22 Feb (a); PRI 0–1	29 Feb (h); 2–0 PHU	03 Mar (a); LUB 0–1	20 Mar (h); 2–1 SON	04 Apr (a); SCC 1–0	11 Apr (h); 3–0 MAI	17 Apr (a); ASA 2–1	21 Apr (h); 1–2 PET	2 May (a); MAQ 0–1	16 May (a); PRO 1–2	26 May (h); 2–0 SOY	30 May (a); ACL 0–0
SAG ESP; 2nd	11 Jul (a); INT 0–0	25 Jul (h); 0–0 PRI	01 Aug (a); PHU 0–3	08 Aug (h); 2–0 LUB	14 Aug (a); SON 0–0	22 Aug (h); 2–0 SCC	11 Sep (a); MAI 0–2	25 Sep (h); 1–1 ASA	02 Oct (a); PET 0–0	17 Oct (h); 1–0 MAQ	23 Oct (h); 2–0 PRO	30 Oct (a); SOY 1–1	06 Nov (h); 2–1 ACL
INTERCL; 3rd	15 Feb (a); SAG 0–0	22 Feb (h); 1–0 SOY	29 Feb (a); ACL 0–1	03 Mar (h); 1–0 PRO	20 Mar (h); 0–1 PRI	04 Apr (a); PHU 3–2	11 Apr (h); 2–0 LUB	17 Apr (a); SON 2–2	21 Apr (h); 3–2 SCC	2 May (a); MAI 1–3	16 May (h); 2–0 ASA	26 May (a); PET 2–0	30 May (h); 4–0 MAQ
INTERCL; 3rd	11 Jul (h); 0–0 SAG	25 Jul (a); SOY 0–1	01 Aug (h); 0–0 ACL	08 Aug (a); PRO 1–1	14 Aug (a); PRI 1–0	22 Aug (h); 2–1 PHU	11 Sep (a); LUB 1–4	25 Sep (h); 2–1 SON	02 Oct (a); SCC 0–1	17 Oct (h); 1–0 MAI	23 Oct (a); ASA 0–0	30 Oct (h); 1–4 PET	06 Nov (a); MAQ 1–2
PET LUA; 4th	15 Feb (h); 2–0 PHU	22 Feb (a); LUB 0–0	29 Feb (h); 2–0 SON	03 Mar (a); SCC 3–1	20 Mar (h); 3–0 MAI	04 Apr (a); ASA 1–1	11 Apr (a); PRO 0–0	17 Apr (h); 2–0 MAQ	21 Apr (a); SAG 1–2	2 May (h); 3–0 SOY	16 May (a); ACL 0–2	26 May (h); 2–0 INT	30 May (a); PRI 2–2
PET LUA; 4th	11 Jul (a); PHU 1–0	25 Jul (h); 1–0 LUB	01 Aug (a); SON 0–2	08 Aug (h); 2–2 SCC	14 Aug (a); MAI 2–2	22 Aug (h); 0–1 ASA	11 Sep (h); 0–1 PRO	25 Sep (a); MAQ 0–3	02 Oct (h); 0–0 SAG	17 Oct (a); SOY 1–1	23 Oct (h); 2–2 ACL	30 Oct (a); INT 1–4	06 Nov (h); 2–0 PRI
SON NAM; 5th	15 Feb (a); MAI 0–0	22 Feb (h); 0–0 ASA	29 Feb (a); PET 2–0	03 Mar (h); 3–0 MAQ	20 Mar (a); SAG 2–1	04 Apr (h); 2–1 SOY	11 Apr (a); ACL 0–0	17 Apr (h); 2–2 INT	21 Apr (a); PRI 1–3	2 May (h); 2–1 PHU	16 May (a); LUB 1–1	26 May (a); PRO 1–1	30 May (h); 3–2 SCC
SON NAM; 5th	11 Jul (h); 1–1 MAI	25 Jul (a); ASA 2–0	01 Aug (h); 0–2 PET	08 Aug (a); MAQ 0–2	14 Aug (h); 0–0 SAG	22 Aug (a); SOY 2–1	11 Sep (h); 4–0 ACL	25 Sep (a); INT 2–1	02 Oct (h); PRI 1–1	17 Oct (a); PHU 1–1	23 Oct (h); 1–1 LUB	30 Oct (h); 2–3 PRO	06 Nov (a); SCC 0–0
PRI AGO; 6th	15 Feb (a); MAQ 0–2	22 Feb (h); 0–1 SAG	29 Feb (a); SOY 0–3	03 Mar (h); 1–0 ACL	20 Mar (a); INT 0–1	04 Apr (h); 0–0 PRO	11 Apr (h); 0–2 PHU	17 Apr (a); LUB 2–1	21 Apr (h); 1–3 SON	2 May (a); SCC 1–3	16 May (h); 1–0 MAI	26 May (a); ASA 8–1	30 May (h); 2–2 PET
PRI AGO; 6th	11 Jul (h); 1–0 MAQ	25 Jul (a); SAG 0–0	01 Aug (h); 0–1 SOY	08 Aug (a); ACL 2–0	14 Aug (h); 1–0 INT	22 Aug (a); PRO 0–0	11 Sep (a); PHU 1–0	25 Sep (h); 0–0 LUB	02 Oct (a); SON 1–1	17 Oct (h); 1–0 SCC	23 Oct (a); MAI 2–1	30 Oct (h); 0–1 ASA	06 Nov (a); PET 2–0
PET HUA; 7th	15 Feb (a); PET 2–0	22 Feb (h); 1–0 MAQ	29 Feb (a); SAG 2–0	03 Mar (h); 3–0 SOY	20 Mar (a); ACL 0–2	04 Apr (h); 3–2 INT	11 Apr (a); PRI 0–2	17 Apr (h); 0–2 PRO	21 Apr (h); 3–3 LUB	2 May (a); SON 2–1	16 May (h); 1–1 SCC	26 May (a); MAI 0–1	30 May (h); 1–1 ASA
PET HUA; 7th	11 Jul (h); 1–0 PET	25 Jul (a); MAQ 2–1	01 Aug (h); 0–3 SAG	08 Aug (a); SOY 0–0	14 Aug (h); 1–1 ACL	22 Aug (a); INT 2–1	11 Sep (h); 1–0 PRI	25 Sep (a); PRO 1–1	02 Oct (a); LUB 3–1	17 Oct (h); 1–1 SON	23 Oct (a); SCC 3–0	30 Oct (h); 0–1 MAI	06 Nov (a); ASA 4–1
PRI MAI; 8th	15 Feb (h); 0–0 SON	22 Feb (a); SCC 1–1	29 Feb (a); PRO 0–0	03 Mar (h); 0–2 ASA	20 Mar (a); PET 3–0	04 Apr (h); 1–2 MAQ	11 Apr (a); SAG 3–0	17 Apr (h); 0–0 SOY	21 Apr (a); ACL 1–2	2 May (h); 1–3 INT	16 May (a); PRI 1–0	26 May (h); 0–1 PHU	30 May (a); LUB 0–1
PRI MAI; 8th	11 Jul (a); SON 1–1	25 Jul (h); 1–2 SCC	01 Aug (h); 1–0 PRO	08 Aug (a); ASA 6–0	14 Aug (h); 2–2 PET	22 Aug (a); MAQ 0–1	11 Sep (h); 0–2 SAG	25 Sep (a); SOY 1–1	02 Oct (h); 1–0 ACL	17 Oct (a); INT 1–0	23 Oct (h); 2–1 PRI	30 Oct (a); PHU 0–1	06 Nov (h); 3–0 LUB
SPO CAB; 9th	15 Feb (a); PRO 3–3	22 Feb (h); 1–1 MAI	29 Feb (a); ASA 3–0	03 Mar (h); 3–1 PET	20 Mar (a); MAQ 1–1	04 Apr (h); 1–0 SAG	11 Apr (a); SOY 0–0	17 Apr (h); 1–1 ACL	21 Apr (a); INT 3–2	2 May (h); 1–3 PRI	16 May (a); PHU 1–1	26 May (h); 1–1 LUB	30 May (a); SON 3–2
SPO CAB; 9th	11 Jul (h); 1–0 PRO	25 Jul (a); MAI 1–2	01 Aug (h); 0–0 ASA	08 Aug (a); PET 2–2	14 Aug (h); 3–0 MAQ	22 Aug (a); SAG 2–0	11 Sep (h); 1–1 SOY	25 Sep (a); ACL 1–1	02 Oct (h); 0–1 INT	17 Oct (a); PRI 1–0	23 Oct (h); 3–0 PHU	30 Oct (a); LUB 1–0	06 Nov (h); 0–0 SON
ACA LOB; 10th	15 Feb (a); SOY 1–2	22 Feb (h); 0–0 PRO	29 Feb (h); 0–1 INT	15 Feb (a); PRI 1–0	20 Mar (h); 0–2 PHU	04 Apr (a); LUB 0–2	11 Apr (h); 0–0 SON	17 Apr (a); SCC 1–1	21 Apr (h); 1–2 MAI	2 May (a); ASA 4–1	16 May (h); 0–2 PET	26 May (a); MAQ 0–1	30 May (h); 0–0 SAG
ACA LOB; 10th	11 Jul (h); 4–3 SOY	25 Jul (a); PRO 1–1	01 Ago (a); INT 0–0	08 Aug (h); 2–0 PRI	14 Ago (a); PHU 1–1	22 Aug (h); 2–1 LUB	11 Sep (a); SON 4–0	25 Sep (h); 1–1 SCC	02 Oct (a); MAI 1–0	17 Oct (h); 0–1 ASA	23 Oct (a); PET 2–2	30 Oct (h); 6–0 MAQ	06 Nov (a); SAG 2–1
PRO SAM; 11th	15 Feb (h); 3–3 SCC	22 Feb (a); ACL 0–0	29 Feb (h); 0–0 MAI	03 Mar (a); INT 1–0	20 Mar (h); 0–0 ASA	04 Apr (a); PRI 0–0	11 Apr (h); 0–0 PET	17 Apr (a); PHU 0–2	21 Apr (h); 2–1 MAQ	2 May (a); LUB 3–0	16 May (h); 1–2 SAG	26 May (h); 1–1 SON	30 May (a); SOY 1–0
PRO SAM; 11th	11 Jul (a); SCC 1–0	25 Jul (h); 1–1 ACL	01 Aug (a); MAI 1–0	08 Aug (h); 1–1 INT	14 Aug (a); ASA 2–0	22 Aug (h); 0–0 PRI	11 Sep (a); PET 0–1	25 Sep (h); 1–1 PHU	02 Oct (a); MAQ 1–3	17 Oct (h); 1–0 LUB	23 Oct (a); SAG 2–0	30 Oct (a); SON 2–3	06 Nov (h); 2–2 SOY
ACA SOY; 12th	15 Feb (h); 1–2 ACL	22 Feb (a); INT 1–0	29 Feb (h); 0–3 PRI	03 Mar (a); PHU 3–0	20 Mar (h); 1–0 LUB	04 Apr (a); SON 2–1	11 Apr (h); 0–0 SCC	17 Apr (a); MAI 0–0	21 Apr (h); 2–0 ASA	2 May (a); PET 3–0	16 May (h); 1–1 MAQ	26 May (a); SAG 2–0	30 May (h); 1–0 PRO
ACA SOY; 12th	11 Jul (a); ACL 4–3	25 Jul (h); 0–1 INT	01 Aug (a); PRI 0–1	08 Aug (h); 0–0 PHU	14 Aug (a); LUB 1–1	22 Aug (h); 2–1 SON	11 Sep (a); SCC 1–1	25 Sep (h); 1–1 MAI	02 Oct (a); ASA 2–0	17 Oct (h); 1–1 PET	23 Oct (a); MAQ 0–2	30 Oct (h); 1–1 SAG	06 Nov (a); PRO 2–2
BEN LUB; 13th	15 Feb (a); ASA 3–0	22 Feb (h); 0–0 PET	29 Feb (a); MAQ 0–1	03 Mar (h); 0–1 SAG	20 Mar (a); SOY 1–0	04 Apr (h); 0–2 ACL	11 Apr (a); INT 2–0	17 Apr (h); 2–1 PRI	21 Apr (a); PHU 3–3	2 May (h); 3–0 PRO	16 May (h); 1–1 SON	26 May (a); SCC 1–1	30 May (h); 0–1 MAI
BEN LUB; 13th	11 Jul (h); 1–1 ASA	25 Jul (a); PET 1–0	01 Aug (h); 2–0 MAQ	08 Aug (a); SAG 2–0	14 Aug (h); 1–1 SOY	22 Aug (a); ACL 2–1	11 Sep (h); 1–4 INT	25 Sep (a); PRI 0–0	02 Oct (h); 3–1 PHU	17 Oct (a); PRO 1–0	23 Oct (a); SON 1–1	30 Oct (h); 1–0 SCC	06 Nov (a); MAI 3–0
BRA MAQ; 14th	15 Feb (h); 0–2 PRI	22 Feb (a); PHU 1–0	29 Feb (h); 0–1 LUB	03 Mar (a); SON 3–0	20 Mar (h); 1–1 SCC	04 Apr (a); MAI 1–2	11 Apr (h); 0–4 ASA	17 Apr (a); PET 2–0	21 Apr (a); PRO 2–1	2 May (h); 0–1 SAG	16 May (a); SOY 1–1	26 May (h); 0–1 ACL	30 May (a); INT 4–0
BRA MAQ; 14th	11 Jul (a); PRI 1–0	25 Jul (h); 2–1 PHU	01 Aug (a); LUB 2–0	08 Aug (h); 0–2 SON	14 Aug (a); SCC 3–0	22 Aug (h); 0–1 MAI	11 Sep (a); ASA 4–1	25 Sep (h); 0–3 PET	02 Oct (h); 1–3 PRO	17 Oct (a); SAG 1–0	23 Oct (h); 0–2 SOY	30 Oct (a); ACL 6–0	06 Nov (h); 1–2 INT

== Season statistics ==
=== Top scorers ===
Rank	Scorer	Club	Goals
1	(Angola) Love	ASA	17
2	(Angola) Flávio	Petro Luanda	14
2	(Angola) Bebeto	Sonangol Namibe	14
2	(Angola) Jaburú	Petro Huambo	14
3	(Angola) Kadima	ASA	10
4	(Angola) Chinho	Sagrada Esperança	7
5	(Angola) Diangane	Sonangol Namibe	6
5	(Angola) André	Interclube	6
6	(Angola) Lucas	Académica do Lobito	5
7	(Angola) Mano	Petro Huambo	4

=== Hat-tricks ===
Player	For	Against	Result	Date
Nelo	Sporting de Cabinda	Progresso do Sambizanga	3-3	15 February 2004

2004 Girabola winner
Atlético Sport Aviação
3rd title

Squad: Ângelo, Délcio, Fefé, Humberto, Jacinto, Jamba, Kadima, Love, Malamba, Mateus, Matias, Milex, Nuno, Papy, Paulão, Rats, Renato, Rodrigo, Sérgio, Silas, Simão, Toizinho, Vieira, Yamba Asha
Head coach: Bernardino Pedroto
