= 2002 Girabola =

Girabola 2002
- Season: 2002 (Feb 23–Oct 20)
- Champions: ASA
- Relegated: Benfica do Lubango; F.C. de Cabinda; Sporting do Bié
- 2003 CAF Champions League: ASA (Girabola winner)
- 2003 CAF Cup: 1º de Agosto (Girabola runner-up)
- Matches: 182
- Goals: 374 (2.05 per match)
- Top goalscorer: Flávio Amado (16 goals)
- Biggest home win: ASA 7–0 Des Hui (01 Jul 2002)
- Biggest away win: 3 matches: Des Hui 1–4 ASA (06 Mar 2002); Ben Lub 1–4 Aca Lob (30 Mar 2002); Spo Cab 1–4 ASA (29 Sep 2002)
- Highest scoring: ASA 7–0 Des Hui (01 Jul 2002)

The 2002 Girabola was the 24th season of top-tier football competition in Angola. The season ran from 23 February to 20 October 2002. Petro de Luanda were the defending champions.

The league comprised 14 teams, the bottom three of which were relegated to the 2003 Gira Angola.

ASA were crowned champions, winning their first title, while Benfica do Lubango, Futebol Clube de Cabinda and Sporting do Bié, were relegated.

Flávio Amado of Petro de Luanda finished as the top scorer with 16 goals.

== Changes from the 2001 season ==
Relegated: Bravos do Maquis, Primeiro de Maio and Progresso do Sambizanga
Promoted: Desportivo da Huíla, Sporting de Cabinda and Sporting do Bié

Locations of the 2002 Girabola teams

== League table ==
Pos	Team	Pld	W	D	L	GF	GA	GD	Pts	Qualification or relegation
1	ASA (C)	26	17	6	3	44	16	+28	57	Qualification for Champions League
2	Primeiro de Agosto	26	15	8	3	39	11	+28	53	Qualification for CAF Cup
3	Petro de Luanda	26	15	6	5	47	17	+30	51	
4	Petro do Huambo	26	11	7	8	29	27	+2	40	
5	Interclube	26	10	9	7	28	24	+4	39	
6	Académica do Lobito	26	10	9	7	28	27	+1	39	
7	Sporting de Cabinda	26	9	8	9	18	23	−5	35	
8	Benfica de Luanda	26	8	8	10	23	27	−4	32	
9	Sagrada Esperança	26	8	7	11	17	29	−12	31	
10	Desportivo da Huíla	26	8	5	13	26	40	−14	29	
11	Sonangol do Namibe (Note: Name later changed to Atlético do Namibe)	26	6	10	10	18	23	−5	28	
12	FC de Cabinda (R)	26	7	5	14	25	39	−14	26	Relegation to Provincial stages
13	Sporting do Bié (R)	26	7	3	16	18	31	−13	24	Relegation to Provincial stages
14	Benfica do Lubango (R)	26	4	3	19	14	40	−26	15	Relegation to Provincial stages

Updated to match(es) played on 20 October 2002. Source: Girabola.com
Rules for classification: 1) Points; 2) Head-to-head points; 3) Head-to-head goal difference; 4) Goal difference; 5) Goals scored; 6) Fair-play points; 7) Play-off.
(C) Champions; (R) Relegated

== Results ==
Home \ Away	ACL	ASA	BEN	BLB	DES	FCC	INT	PET	PHU	PRI	SAG	SBI	SCC	SON
Académica do Lobito	—	1–1	1–1	2–1	0–0	3–1	2–1	0–0	3–0	0–0	0–0	1–0	1–0	2–1
ASA	3–0	—	3–1	2–1	7–0	2–0	1–0	1–0	2–2	0–0	0–1	1–0	2–1	3–0
Benfica de Luanda	2–2	1–2	—	3–0	1–1	1–0	2–0	0–1	0–1	4–2	0–1	0–2	1–2	0–0
Benfica do Lubango	1–4	0–1	0–1	—	1–2	1–0	0–0	0–1	0–1	0–1	0–1	3–1	0–2	1–0
Desportivo da Huíla	1–0	1–4	0–1	0–0	—	2–0	1–2	1–2	4–1	1–2	0–0	1–0	2–2	2–0
FC de Cabinda	1–0	0–1	0–0	3–1	3–2	—	2–4	0–0	3–0	0–3	5–1	3–2	0–0	0–0
Interclube	2–2	1–1	0–1	1–0	0–3	2–2	—	2–1	0–0	1–0	3–1	1–0	1–1	1–1
Petro de Luanda	3–0	2–0	4–2	4–0	5–1	6–1	0–2	—	2–0	0–1	1–0	4–0	4–0	1–1
Petro do Huambo	0–0	0–0	3–0	1–1	2–0	0–1	0–1	1–1	—	1–0	3–0	4–0	1–0	2–1
Primeiro de Agosto	2–0	2–0	0–0	5–0	2–0	3–0	0–0	1–1	4–1	—	3–0	1–0	3–0	1–0
Sagrada Esperança	2–1	0–1	0–1	1–0	0–1	1–0	0–2	0–1	2–3	2–2	—	1–1	1–0	0–0
Sporting do Bié	3–0	0–1	2–0	0–3	1–0	2–0	1–0	0–1	0–1	0–0	1–1	—	1–0	1–2
Sporting de Cabinda	0–1	1–4	0–0	1–0	2–0	1–0	0–0	2–1	1–0	0–0	0–0	1–0	—	1–0
Sonangol do Namibe	1–2	1–1	0–0	2–0	2–0	1–0	2–1	1–1	1–1	0–1	0–1	1–0	0–0	—

Updated to match(es) played on 20 October 2002. Source: girabola.com
Legend: Blue = home team win; Yellow = draw; Red = away team win.

== Season statistics ==
=== Top scorers ===
Rank	Scorer	Club	Goals
1	(Angola) Flávio *	Petro Luanda	16
2	(Angola) Loló	1º de Agosto	16
3	(Angola) Kadima	ASA	11
4	(Angola) Lucas	1º de Agosto	10
5	(Angola) Bravo da Rosa	Desportivo Huíla	8

* Less matches played

2002 Girabola winner

1st title

Squad: Bubista, Dadá, Fofaná, Jacinto, Jamba, Kadima, Love, Malamba, Milex, Minhonha, Papy, Sérgio, Silas, Silva, Simão, Suka, Taty, Tony Osódio, Vieira,
Yamba Asha
Head coach: Bernardino Pedroto
