= 1987 Girabola =

Angola football league season

Girabola 1987
- Season: 1987 (–)
- Champions: Petro Luanda
- Relegated: Desp Chela; Progresso; União Bié
- 1988 African Cup of Champions Clubs: Petro Luanda (Girabola winner)
- Matches played: 182
- Goals scored: 483 (2.65 per match)
- Top goalscorer: Mavó (20 goals)

The 1987 Girabola was the ninth season of top-tier football competition in Angola. Atlético Petróleos de Luanda were the defending champions.

The league comprised 14 teams, the bottom three of which were relegated.

Petro de Luanda were crowned champions, winning their 4th title, and second in a row, while Desportivo da Chela, Progresso do Sambizanga and União Sport do Bié were relegated.

Mavango Kiala aka Mavó of Ferroviário da Huíla finished as the top scorer with 20 goals.

== Changes from the 1986 season ==
Relegated: Desportivo de Benguela, Inter da Lunda Sul, Leões de Luanda
Promoted: Dínamos do Kwanza Sul, Progresso do Sambizanga, União do Bié

Locations of the 1987 Girabola teams

== League table ==
Pos	Team	Pld	W	D	L	GF	GA	GD	Pts	Qualification or relegation
1	Petro de Luanda (C)	26	16	6	4	52	18	+34	38	Qualification for Champions Cup
2	Primeiro de Agosto	26	15	5	6	47	27	+20	35	
3	Petro do Huambo	26	11	12	3	44	23	+21	34	
4	Inter de Luanda (Note: Name later changed to Interclube)	26	11	10	5	43	36	+7	32	
5	Ferroviário da Huíla	26	10	10	6	41	38	+3	30	
6	FC de Cabinda	26	11	6	9	34	24	+10	28	
7	Sagrada Esperança	26	9	7	10	33	29	+4	25	
8	Primeiro de Maio	26	8	9	9	28	31	−3	25	
9	Desportivo da TAAG (Note: Name later reverted to its original ASA)	26	6	11	9	35	41	−6	23	
10	Dínamos do Cuanza Sul	26	8	7	11	24	35	−11	23	
11	Mambroa (Note: Name later reverted to its original Benfica do Huambo)	26	6	10	10	27	38	−11	22	
12	Progresso do Sambizanga (R)	26	9	4	13	33	44	−11	22	Relegation to Provincial stages
13	Desportivo da Chela (Note: Name later reverted to its original Benfica do Lubango) (R)	26	5	9	12	23	45	−22	19	Relegation to Provincial stages
14	União Sport do Bié (R)	26	3	2	21	19	54	−35	8	Relegation to Provincial stages

Updated to match(es) played on 22 November 1987. Source: Girabola.com
Rules for classification: 1) Points; 2) Head-to-head points; 3) Head-to-head goal difference; 4) Goal difference; 5) Goals scored; 6) Fair-play points; 7) Play-off.
(C) Champions; (R) Relegated

== Results ==
Home \ Away	DCH	DCS	DTA	FCC	FHL	INT	MAM	PET	PHU	PRI	PRM	PRO	SAG	USB
Desportivo da Chela	—	0–2	2–2	2–1	0–1	1–2	1–1	1–6	1–0	0–2	0–1	1–1	2–1	1–0
Dínamos do Cuanza Sul	1–1	—	1–1	1–0	1–1	2–1	1–3	1–0	1–1	2–3	2–1	0–2	2–0	2–1
Desportivo da Taag	1–1	0–0	—	0–1	1–1	1–1	3–2	0–2	1–1	4–3	1–1	1–2	2–3	0–0
FC de Cabinda	1–1	1–3	5–0	—	2–1	1–0	5–0	0–0	0–0	1–2	1–1	2–0	0–0	1–0
Ferroviário da Huíla	5–0	3–3	3–0	3–2	—	2–0	4–0	1–1	2–2	2–1	1–1	1–1	2–1	1–0
Inter de Luanda	3–3	1–3	4–1	0–3	1–1	—	3–3	2–1	1–1	3–2	2–1	1–0	2–1	3–0
Mambroa	1–1	0–0	1–0	2–1	1–1	2–2	—	0–1	1–0	0–4	1–1	1–2	1–1	3–0
Petro de Luanda	3–0	2–1	1–0	0–1	5–0	1–3	2–0	—	1–1	1–1	4–0	7–1	3–1	3–0 (Note: Petro de Luanda was awarded a 3–0 win)
Petro do Huambo	4–0	4–1	1–1	3–0	2–2	1–1	1–0	0–1	—	2–1	2–0	3–2	1–1	6–2
Primeiro de Agosto	1–1	2–0	1–0	1–0	3–0	1–1	1–0	0–1	1–2	—	2–1	2–0	2–1	4–1
Primeiro de Maio	2–0	3–1	1–0	1–1	4–0	1–1	1–0	1–1	1–1	1–1	—	1–0	1–0	0–1
Progresso do Sambizanga	2–1	3–2	1–1	0–1	4–1	1–1	1–3	0–1	0–2	1–2	2–1	—	1–3	3–2
Sagrada Esperança	1–0	0–1	0–1	3–1	2–0	0–1	0–0	2–2	1–1	1–1	5–1	1–0	—	2–1
União Sport do Bié	0–2	1–2	2–1	0–2	0–2	2–3	1–1	1–2	0–2	1–3	1–0	2–3	0–2	—

Updated to match(es) played on 22 November 1987. Source: girabola.com
Legend: Blue = home team win; Yellow = draw; Red = away team win.

== Season statistics ==
=== Scorers ===
R/T
R/T	DCH	DCS	DTA	FCC	FHL	INT	MAM	PET	PHU	PRI	PRM	PRO	SAG	USB	TOTAL
1	15/2/87	15/2/87	4/3/87	15/2/87	15/2/87	15/2/87	14/2/87	14/2/87	15/2/87	15/2/87	4/3/87	15/2/87	15/2/87	15/2/87	_{16}18
1	USB–DCH 0–2; Currula ' Isidro '	DCS–PRO 0–2	PRM–DTA 3–1; Bravo da Rosa II '	PHU–FCC 3–0	FHL–SAG 2–1; Barbosa 50'; Jaburú 84'	PRI–INT 1–1; Raúl Kinanga 30'	PET–MAM 2–0	PET–MAM 2–0; Jesus 9'; Antoninho 71'	PHU–FCC 3–0; Bolingó 2'; Benjamim 26'; Carlos Pedro 84'	PRI–INT 1–1; Vieira Dias 23'	PRM–DTA 3–1; Chiquinho ' Melanchton ' Sarmento '	DCS–PRO 0–2	FHL–SAG 2–1; Quintino 30'	USB–DCH 0–2	_{16}18
2	17/6/87	1/5/87	1/5/87	22/2/87	22/2/87	21/2/87	22/2/87	17/6/87	22/2/87	22/2/87	22/2/87	22/2/87	22/2/87	21/2/87	_{10}19
2	PET–DCH 3–0	DCS–DTA 1–1; Yeba '	DCS–DTA 1–1; Coreano '	MAM–FCC 2–1	FHL–PHU 2–2	INT–USB 3–0; Pirocas 24'; Jesus 44'; Túbia 83'	MAM–FCC 2–1; Patrick 66'	PET–DCH 3–0; Antoninho 2'; Haia 8'; Balalau 13'	FHL–PHU 2–2	PRO–PRI 1–2; Ndunguidi '	PRM–SAG 1–0	PRO–PRI 1–2	PRM–SAG 1–0	INT–USB 3–0	_{10}19
3	1/3/87	1/3/87	28/2/87	1/3/87	1/3/87	20/5/87	1/3/87	20/5/87	1/3/87	28/2/87	1/3/87	1/3/87	1/3/87	1/3/87	_{8}19
3	DCH–FCC 2–1	PRM–DCS 1–0	PRI–DTA 2–0	DCH–FCC 2–1	MAM–FHL 1–1	PET–INT 1–3; Felito 22'; Bebé 65'; Jesus 73'	MAM–FHL 1–1	PET–INT 1–3; Jesus 13'	SAG–PHU 1–1	PRI–DTA 2–0; Vieira Dias 16'; Ndunguidi 18'pen.	PRM–DCS 1–0; Moisés 7'	USB–PRO 2–3	SAG–PHU 1–1; Quintino '	USB–PRO 2–3	_{8}19
4	8/3/87	8/3/87	7/3/87	8/3/87	8/3/87	8/3/87	8/3/87	3/6/87	8/3/87	8/3/87	8/3/87	3/6/87	8/3/87	7/3/87	_{7}12
4	DCH–FHL 0–1	DCS–PRI 2–3	DTA–USB 0–0	INT–FCC 0–3; Assana 25'; Clara 30' 84'	DCH–FHL 0–1; Mavó 83'	INT–FCC 0–3	SAG–MAM 0–0	PRO–PET 0–1; Haia 33'	PHU–PRM 2–0	DCS–PRI 2–3; Ndunguidi ' Vieira Dias '	PHU–PRM 2–0	PRO–PET 0–1	SAG–MAM 0–0	DTA–USB 0–0	_{7}12
5	15/3/87	15/3/87	15/3/87	14/3/87	1/5/87	1/5/87		15/3/87		14/3/87	14/3/87	14/3/87	15/3/87	15/3/87	_{11}15
5	SAG–DCH 1–0	USB–DCS 2–1	PET–DTA 2–1; Alex 19'	FCC–PRO 2–0; Assana 40'; Fanfan 43'	FHL–INT 0–2; Mavó ' Ndisso '	FHL–INT 0–2	PHU–MAM 1–0	PET–DTA 2–1; Quim Sebas 35'; Antoninho 89'	PHU–MAM 1–0	PRI–PRM 2–1; Nelito Kwanza ' Cabinda 58' o.g.	PRI–PRM 2–1; Sozinho pen.	FCC–PRO 2–0	SAG–DCH 1–0; Quintino '	USB–DCS 2–1	_{11}15
6	22/3/87	27/5/87	21/3/87	21/3/87	27/5/87	21/3/87	22/3/87	27/5/87	22/3/87	22/3/87	22/3/87	27/5/87	21/3/87	22/3/87	_{7}17
6	DCH–PHU 1–0	DCS–PET 1–0; Bavi '	DTA–FCC 0–1	DTA–FCC 0–1	PRO–FHL 4–1; Mavó 17'	INT–SAG 2–1	MAM–PRM 1–1	DCS–PET 1–0	DCH–PHU 1–0	USB–PRI 1–3	MAM–PRM 1–1; Sarmento 11'	PRO–FHL 4–1; Mbila x2 Mila ' Teófilo '	INT–SAG 2–1	USB–PRI 1–3	_{7}17
7	19/4/87	18/4/87	19/4/87	18/4/87	19/4/87	19/4/87	19/4/87	21/6/87	19/4/87	21/6/87	20/6/87	19/4/87	19/4/87	20/6/87	_{6}15
7	DCH–MAM 1–1; Adriano 82'	FCC–DCS 5–0	DTA–FHL 1–1	FCC–DCS 5–0	DTA–FHL 1–1	PHU–INT 1–1; Túbia 66'	DCH–MAM 1–1	PET–PRI 1–1; Abel Campos 74'	PHU–INT 1–1; Mona 88'	PET–PRI 1–1; Ndunguidi 27'pen.	PRM–USB 0–1	SAG–PRO 1–0	SAG–PRO 1–0	PRM–USB 0–1; Chiquito 81'	_{6}15
8	10/6/87	26/4/87	25/4/87	10/6/87	26/4/87	26/4/87	26/4/87	10/6/87	26/4/87	10/6/87	10/6/87	26/4/87	25/4/87	10/6/87	_{10}18
8	DCH–PRM 0–1	DCS–FHL 1–1	DTA–SAG 2–3; Saúca 38' 85'	PRI–FCC 1–0	DCS–FHL 1–1	MAM–INT 2–2	MAM–INT 2–2; Patrick 49'	USB–PET 1–2; Avelino pen. Quim Sebas '	PRO–PHU 0–2	PRI–FCC 1–0; Mané pen.	DCH–PRM 0–1	PRO–PHU 0–2	DTA–SAG 2–3; Man'Adão 52' 55'; Joãozinho 53'	USB–PET 1–2; Nunes '	_{10}18
9	5/5/87	17/6/87	5/5/87	24/6/87	6/5/87	5/5/87	3/5/87	6/5/87	5/5/87	6/5/87	6/5/87	3/5/87	17/6/87	24/6/87	_{16}19
9	DCH–INT 1–2; Pedrito '	SAG–DCS 0–1; César 59'	PHU–DTA 4–1; Coreano '	FCC–USB 1–0; Guilherme 79' o.g.	PRI–FHL 3–0	DCH–INT 1–2; Túbia x2	PRO–MAM 1–3	PRM–PET 1–1; Avelino '	PHU–DTA 4–1; Carlos Pedro x3	PRI–FHL 3–0; Amaral ' Manuel Martins ' Ndunguidi '	PRM–PET 1–1; Fusso '	PRO–MAM 1–3; Nascimento 40'	SAG–DCS 0–1	FCC–USB 1–0	_{16}19
10	10/5/87	10/5/87	10/5/87	9/5/87	10/5/87	10/5/87	10/5/87	9/5/87	10/5/87	10/5/87	10/5/87	10/5/87	10/5/87	10/5/87	_{7}12
10	PRO–DCH 2–1; Chiquinho 82'	DCS–PHU 1–1	MAM–DTA 0–0	PET–FCC 0–1; Assana '	FHL–USB 1–0	INT–PRM 2–1; Zeferino 43'; Mendinho 88'	MAM–DTA 0–0	PET–FCC 0–1	DCS–PHU 1–1	SAG–PRI 1–1	INT–PRM 2–1; André Nzuzi 78'	PRO–DCH 2–1; Litos 12'; Ferreira Pinto 77'	SAG–PRI 1–1	FHL–USB 1–0	_{7}12
11	24/5/87	24/5/87	24/5/87	24/5/87	24/5/87	23/5/87	24/5/87	24/5/87	24/5/87	24/5/87	24/5/87	23/5/87	28/6/87	28/6/87	_{12}22
11	DCH–DTA 2–2	DCS–MAM 1–3	DCH–DTA 2–2	PRM–FCC 1–1	PET–FHL 5–0	INT–PRO 1–0; Túbia 28'	DCS–MAM 1–3; Maria x2 Ralph 42'pen.	PET–FHL 5–0; Jesus 21' 66'; Balalau ' Chico Afonso ' Quim Sebas '	PHU–PRI 2–1; Luís Bento ' Picas 71'	PHU–PRI 2–1; Ndunguidi 42'	PRM–FCC 1–1	INT–PRO 1–0	SAG–USB 2–1	SAG–USB 2–1	_{12}22
12	7/6/87	7/6/87	6/6/87	6/6/87	6/6/87	6/6/87	7/6/87	7/6/87	6/6/87	7/6/87	7/6/87	7/6/87	7/6/87	6/6/87	_{17}18
12	DCH–DCS 0–2	DCH–DCS 0–2; César 12'; Bavi 36'	DTA–INT 1–1; Alex '	FCC–FHL 2–1; Clara 23'; Espírito Santo 73'	FCC–FHL 2–1; Jaburú 77'	DTA–INT 1–1; Jesus '	MAM–PRI 0–4	PET–SAG 3–1; Abel Campos x3	USB–PHU 0–2; Carlos Pedro 15'; Mona 60'	MAM–PRI 0–4; Amaral 3'; Vieira Dias ' Bula ' Nelito Kwanza '	PRM–PRO 1–0	PRM–PRO 1–0	PET–SAG 3–1; Joãozinho '	USB–PHU 0–2	_{17}18
13	14/6/87	13/6/87	13/6/87	14/6/87	14/6/87	13/6/87	13/6/87	14/6/87	14/6/87	14/6/87	14/6/87	13/6/87	14/6/87	13/6/87	_{14}21
13	PRI–DCH 1–1; Basílio 50'	INT–DCS 4–1; Calé '	PRO–DTA 3–2; Alex 18'; Ed.Machado 35'	SAG–FCC 3–1	FHL–PRM 1–1	INT–DCS 4–1; Felito 22'; Bebé 65'; Jesus 73'	USB–MAM 1–1	PHU–PET 0–1; Saavedra 13'	PHU–PET 0–1	PRI–DCH 1–1; Vieira Dias 25'	FHL–PRM 1–1	PRO–DTA 3–2; Mila 5' 77'; Teófilo pen.	SAG–FCC 3–1	USB–MAM 1–1; Caetano '	_{14}21
14	23/9/87	4/7/87	4/7/87	4/7/87	5/7/87	5/7/87	5/7/87	5/7/87	4/7/87	5/7/87	4/7/87	4/7/87	5/7/87	23/9/87	_{8}13
14	DCH–USB 1–0; Basílio 2'	PRO–DCS 1–1	DTA–PRM 1–1	FCC–PHU 0–0	SAG–FHL 2–0	INT–PRI 3–2; Gerry 39'; Mendinho 51'; Mariano 72'	MAM–PET 0–1	MAM–PET 0–1	FCC–PHU 0–0	INT–PRI 3–2; Barbosa 57'; Manuel Martins 79'	DTA–PRM 1–1	PRO–DCS 1–1	SAG–FHL 2–0; Quintino x2	DCH–USB 1–0	_{8}13
15	19/7/87	11/11/87	11/11/87	18/7/87	19/7/87	18/7/87	18/7/87	19/7/87	19/7/87	18/7/87	11/11/87	18/7/87	11/11/87	18/7/87	_{14}29
15	DCH–PET 1–6; Barros '	DTA–DCS 0–0	DTA–DCS 0–0	FCC–MAM 5–0; Brito ' Docas x2 Gastão x2	PHU–FHL 2–2	USB–INT 2–3	FCC–MAM 5–0	DCH–PET 1–6	PHU–FHL 2–2	PRI–PRO 2–0; Vieira Dias ' Manuel Martins '	SAG–PRM 5–1; Nelson '	PRI–PRO 2–0	SAG–PRM 5–1; Abreu x2 Inácio ' Quintino ' Melanchton 'o.g.	USB–INT 2–3	_{14}29
16	2/8/87	1/11/87	17/9/87	2/8/87	2/8/87	30/9/87	2/8/87	30/9/87	5/9/87	17/9/87	1/11/87	11/10/87	5/9/87	11/10/87	_{14}26
16	FCC–DCH 1–1	DCS–PRM 2–1	DTA–PRI 4–3; Coreano x2 Saturnino ' Saúca '	FCC–DCH 1–1	FHL–MAM 4–0; Mavó x2	INT–PET 2–1; Felito 25'; Raúl Kinanga 59'	FHL–MAM 4–0	INT–PET 2–1; Jesus '	PHU–SAG 1–1; Santos 72'	DTA–PRI 4–3; Barbosa pen. Cali ' Vieira Dias '	DCS–PRM 2–1	PRO–USB 3–2	PHU–SAG 1–1; Quintino 17'	PRO–USB 3–2	_{14}26
17	16/8/87	15/8/87	16/8/87	15/8/87	16/8/87	15/8/87	15/8/87	16/8/87	16/8/87	15/8/87	16/8/87	16/8/87	15/8/87	16/8/87	_{16}22
17	FHL–DCH 5–0	PRI–DCS 1–0	USB–DTA 1–2	FCC–INT 1–0; Pedrito 6'	FHL–DCH 5–0; Mavó x3 Ndisso x2	FCC–INT 1–0	MAM–SAG 1–1	PET–PRO 7–1; Abel 14' 50'; Avelino 19' Paulão 24' ? Jesus ' Haia '	PRM–PHU 1–1	PRI–DCS 1–0; Ndunguidi 4'pen.	PRM–PHU 1–1	PET–PRO 7–1; Paulino '	MAM–SAG 1–1; Quintino 65'pen.	USB–DTA 1–2	_{16}22
18	22/8/87	23/8/87	22/8/87	23/8/87	22/8/87	22/8/87	23/8/87	22/8/87	23/8/87	23/8/87	23/8/87	23/8/87	22/8/87	23/8/87	_{8}14
18	DCH–SAG 2–1; Adriano 68'; Siba '	DCS–USB 2–1	DTA–PET 0–2	PRO–FCC 0–1; Pedrito 5'	INT–FHL 1–1; Salvador 81'pen.	INT–FHL 1–1; Túbia 41'	MAM–PHU 1–0	DTA–PET 0–2; Abel Campos 17'; Jesus '	MAM–PHU 1–0	PRM–PRI 1–1	PRM–PRI 1–1	PRO–FCC 0–1	DCH–SAG 2–1; Bukaka '	DCS–USB 2–1	_{8}14
19	30/8/87	29/8/87	29/8/87	29/8/87	29/8/87	30/8/87	1/9/87	29/8/87	30/8/87	30/8/87	1/9/87	29/8/87	30/8/87	30/8/87	_{13}18
19	PHU–DCH 4–0	PET–DCS 1–0	FCC–DTA 1–3; Saturnino 30'; Kansas 50'; Coreano 88'	FCC–DTA 1–3; Espírito Santo '	FHL–PRO 1–1; Mavó 27'	SAG–INT 0–1	PRM–MAM 1–0; Pilili 36'	PET–DCS 1–0; Jesus 76'	PHU–DCH 4–0	PRI–USB 4–1; Vieira Dias 24' 44'pen. Barbosa 51'; Degas 83'	PRM–MAM 1–0; Zandú '	FHL–PRO 1–1; Teófilo 40'pen.	SAG–INT 0–1	PRI–USB 4–1	_{13}18
20	13/9/87	13/9/87	13/9/87	13/9/87	13/9/87	12/9/87	13/9/87	13/9/87	12/9/87	13/9/87	13/9/87	13/9/87	13/9/87	13/9/87	_{6}17
20	MAM–DCH 1–1	DCS–FCC 1–0	FHL–DTA 3–3	DCS–FCC 1–0	FHL–DTA 3–3; Mavó x2	INT–PHU 1–1; Feliciano pen.	MAM–DCH 1–1; Aires 15'	PRI–PET 0–1; Nelo 'o.g.	INT–PHU 1–1; Carlos Pedro 68'	PRI–PET 0–1	USB–PRM 1–0	PRO–SAG 1–3	PRO–SAG 1–3	USB–PRM 1–0	_{6}17
21	27/9/87	27/9/87	27/9/87	26/9/87	27/9/87	27/9/87	27/9/87	26/9/87	27/9/87	26/9/87	27/9/87	27/9/87	27/9/87	26/9/87	_{6}23
21	PRM–DCH 2–0	FHL–DCS 3–0	SAG–DTA 0–1	FCC–PRI 1–2; Docas 43'	FHL–DCS 3–0; Mavó '	INT–MAM 3–3	INT–MAM 3–3	PET–USB 3–0; WALKOVER	PHU–PRO 3–2	FCC–PRI 1–2; Manuel Martins 26'; Vieira Dias 85'	PRM–DCH 2–0	PHU–PRO 3–2	SAG–DTA 0–1	PET–USB 3–0; WALKOVER	_{6}23
22	4/10/87	22/11/87	3/10/87	3/10/87	4/10/87	4/10/87	4/10/87	3/10/87	3/10/87	4/10/87	3/10/87	4/10/87	22/11/87	3/10/87	_{6}22
22	INT–DCH 3–3; Adriano 1'	DCS–SAG 2–0	DTA–PHU 1–1	USB–FCC 0–2	FHL–PRI 2–1; Mavó x2	INT–DCH 3–3	MAM–PRO 1–2	PET–PRM 4–0; Abel Campos x3	DTA–PHU 1–1	FHL–PRI 2–1	PET–PRM 4–0	MAM–PRO 1–2	DCS–SAG 2–0	USB–FCC 0–2	_{6}22
23	18/10/87	18/10/87	18/10/87	17/10/87	21/11/87	4/11/87	18/10/87	17/10/87	18/10/87	17/10/87	4/11/87	18/10/87	17/10/87	21/11/87	_{7}16
23	DCH–PRO 1–1	PHU–DCS 1–1	DTA–MAM 3–2	FCC–PET 0–0	USB–FHL 0–2; Ndisso x2	PRM–INT 1–1; Jesus '	DTA–MAM 3–2	FCC–PET 0–0	PHU–DCS 1–1	PRI–SAG 2–1; Amaral ' Vieira Dias '	PRM–INT 1–1; Zandú '	DCH–PRO 1–1	PRI–SAG 2–1; Paím 'o.g.	USB–FHL 0–2	_{7}16
24	31/10/87	25/10/87	31/10/87	28/10/87	1/11/87	31/10/87	25/10/87	1/11/87	1/11/87	1/11/87	28/10/87	31/10/87	31/10/87	31/10/87	_{4}14
24	DTA–DCH 1–1	MAM–DCS 1–0	DTA–DCH 1–1	FCC–PRM 1–1	FHL–PET 1–1; Mavó '	PRO–INT 1–1; Toninho 85'	MAM–DCS 1–0	FHL–PET 1–1	PRI–PHU 1–2; Carlos Pedro '	PRI–PHU 1–2	FCC–PRM 1–1	PRO–INT 1–1; Santinho 15'	USB–SAG 0–2	USB–SAG 0–2	_{4}14
25	8/11/87	8/11/87	8/11/87	8/11/87	8/11/87	8/11/87	7/11/87	7/11/87		7/11/87	7/11/87	7/11/87	7/11/87		_{4}27
25	DCS–DCH 1–1	DCS–DCH 1–1	INT–DTA 1–3	FHL–FCC 3–2; Mavó x2	FHL–FCC 3–2	INT–DTA 1–3	PRI–MAM 1–0	SAG–PET 2–2	PHU–USB 6–2; Carlos Pedro x2	PRI–MAM 1–0	PRO–PRM 2–1	PRO–PRM 2–1	SAG–PET 2–2	PHU–USB 6–2	_{4}27
26	14/11/87	18/11/87	14/11/87	14/11/87	14/11/87	18/11/87	14/11/87	14/11/87	14/11/87	14/11/87	14/11/87	14/11/87	14/11/87	14/11/87	_{2}17
26	DCH–PRI 0–2	DCS–INT 2–1; Lourenço 18'pen. Tontom 21'	DTA–PRO 1–2	FCC–SAG 0–0	PRM–FHL 4–1	DCS–INT 2–1	MAM–USB 3–0	PET–PHU 1–1	PET–PHU 1–1	DCH–PRI 0–2	PRM–FHL 4–0	DTA–PRO 1–2	FCC–SAG 0–0	MAM–USB 3–0	_{2}17
T	_{11} 23	_{8} 24	_{16} 35	_{18} 34	_{26} 41	_{27} 43	_{7} 27	_{40} 52	_{16} 44	_{35} 47	_{11} 28	_{13} 33	_{18} 33	_{3} 19	483

=== Top scorer ===
- (Angola) Mavango Kiala Mavó

== Champions ==
1987 Girabola winner
Atlético Petróleos de Luanda
4th title

Squad: Abel, Antoninho, Avelino, Balalau, Chico Afonso, Jesus, Lúcio, Ndongala, Nejó, Paulão, Quim Sebas, Rasgado, Saavedra, S^{to} António, Wilson
Head coach: Antônio Clemente
