= Manuel Costa =

Manuel Costa may refer to:

- Manuel Costa (cyclist) (born 1921), Spanish cyclist
- Manuel Costa (footballer) (born 1989), Angolan footballer
