= Bubista =

Cape Verdean footballer and coach (born 1970)

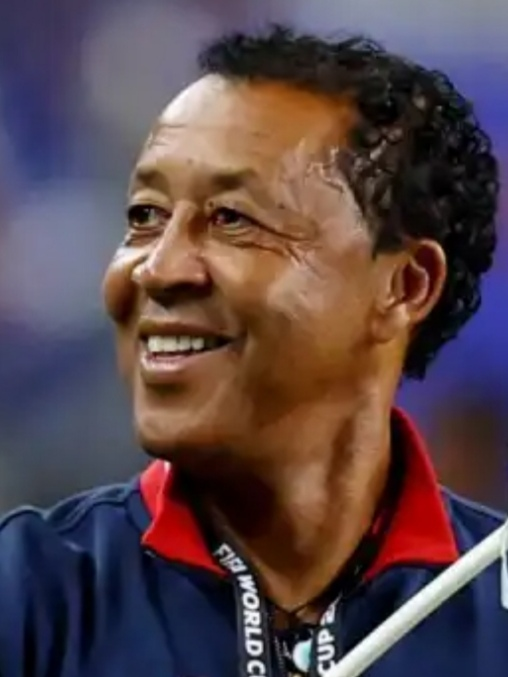
- Bubista in 2026

Personal information
- Full name: Pedro Leitão Brito
- Date of birth: 6 January 1970 (age 56)
- Place of birth: Povoação Velha, Boa Vista, Cape Verde
- Height: 1.80 m (5 ft 11 in)
- Position: Centre-back

Team information
- Current team: RS Berkane (manager)

Senior career*
Years	Team	Apps	(Gls)
1995–1996	Badajoz	2	(0)
1996–2002	ASA		
2002–2003	Estoril		
2003–2006	Falcões do Norte		

International career
1989–2005	Cape Verde	21	(0)

Managerial career
- 2012–2013: Mindelense
- 2015: Académica Mindelo
- 2015–2016: Sporting Praia
- 2017: Académica Mindelo
- 2018–2019: Batuque
- 2020–2026: Cape Verde
- 2026–: RS Berkane
- * Club domestic league appearances and goals

Pedro Leitão Brito (Portuguese: [ˈpe.dɾu lej.ˈtɐ̃w ˈbɾi.tu]; born 6 January 1970), commonly known as Bubista (Kabuverdianu: [bu.ˈbis.tɐ]), is a Cape Verdean professional football manager and former player who played as a centre-back. He is the manager of Botola Pro club RS Berkane.

As the manager of the Cape Verde national team, he led Cape Verde to its first ever FIFA World Cup, in 2026, reaching the round of 32.

== Club career ==
In December 1995, Bubista joined Spanish Segunda División club Badajoz. Bubista eventually made his debut for the club on 4 May 1996, playing the full 90 minutes in a 3–0 win against Getafe. Bubista would make one final appearance for Badajoz a week later, coming on as a 60th minute substitute, replacing Pablo Zegarra, against Osasuna. In 1997, Bubista joined Angolan club ASA. Bubista played for ASA for six seasons, before returning to his native Cape Verde, joining Falcões do Norte in 2003.

== International career ==
Bubista made his debut for Cape Verde as a substitute in a 1–0 loss to Guinea in the semifinal of the 1989 Amílcar Cabral Cup. Bubista later captained the country, making a total of 21 appearances (sometimes listed as 28 appearances) for Cape Verde during his career.

== Managerial career ==
Following his playing career, Bubista managed domestic Cape Verdean clubs Mindelense, Académica do Mindelo, Sporting Praia and Batuque. In January 2020, he was named manager of Cape Verde. He managed his nation to qualification for the 2021 Africa Cup of Nations after a 1–0 away victory over Mozambique on the final matchday. He later guided the team to the 2023 Africa Cup of Nations, where they advanced to the quarterfinals.

On 13 October 2025, he led Cape Verde to its first ever FIFA World Cup after a 3–0 home win against Eswatini. Doing so, Cape Verde became the second-smallest nation ever to reach the World Cup after Iceland did it in 2018. He was subsequently named the CAF Coach of the Year for 2025, at the CAF Awards 2025.

In Cape Verde's first game of the 2026 FIFA World Cup, Bubista's side held Spain to a scoreless draw, considered one of the biggest upsets in World Cup history, with Spain having been ranked 65 spots above Cape Verde by FIFA. Following a second upset, in a 2–2 draw with Uruguay and a second scoreless draw against Saudi Arabia, Bubista's Cape Verde qualified for the round of 32, where they were drawn against reigning champions Argentina. Despite taking Argentina to extra time, Cape Verde ultimately were eliminated in a 3–2 defeat, with Bubista speaking of his pride in his players and their representation of the nation.

On 3 August 2026, Bubista became the head coach of Botola Pro club RS Berkane, signing a two-year contract.

== Career statistics ==
=== International ===
Appearances and goals by national team and year
National team	Year	Apps	Goals
Cape Verde	1989	1	0
Cape Verde	1990	0	0
Cape Verde	1991	0	0
Cape Verde	1992	0	0
Cape Verde	1993	0	0
Cape Verde	1994	0	0
Cape Verde	1995	0	0
Cape Verde	1996	0	0
Cape Verde	1997	0	0
Cape Verde	1998	1	0
Cape Verde	1999	0	0
Cape Verde	2000	3	0
Cape Verde	2001	0	0
Cape Verde	2002	3	0
Cape Verde	2003	5	0
Cape Verde	2004	5	0
Cape Verde	2005	3	0
Total		21	0

== Managerial statistics ==
As of 4 August 2026

Managerial record by team and tenure
Team	Nat.	From	To	Record					Ref.
Team	Nat.	From	To	G	W	D	L	Win %	Ref.
Cape Verde	(Cape Verde)	29 January 2020	3 August 2026	68	31	19	18	45.59	
RS Berkane	(Morocco)	4 August 2026	Present	5	2	3	0	40.00	
Career Total				73	33	22	18	45.21	

== Honours ==
=== Player ===
ASA (Atlético Sport Aviação)

- Girabola (Angola): 2002

=== Coach ===
CS Mindelense

- Cape Verdean Football Championships: 2013
- São Vicente Premier Division: 2012–13

Individual

- CAF Coach of the Year: 2025
