= Fiston Bokungu Ndjoli =

Congolese footballer (born 1986)

Personal information
- Full name: Fiston Bokungu Ndjoli
- Date of birth: 29 July 1986 (age 40)
- Place of birth: Kinshasa, Zaïre
- Height: 1.70 m (5 ft 7 in)
- Position: Midfielder

Senior career*
Years	Team	Apps	(Gls)
2003–2005	AS Vita Club		
2005–2006	Gilan FK		
2006–2007	Union SG		
2008	DC Motema Pembe		
2008–2010	APR FC		
2010	ASA		
2011–2012	Kabuscorp		
2012–2014	AS Mangasport		
2014	União Uíge		

International career
2009–2010	DR Congo	2	(0)
- * Club domestic league appearances and goals

Fiston Bokungu Ndjoli (born 29 July 1986) is a Congolese former footballer who played as a midfielder.
