= Serge Lofo Bongeli =

Congolese footballer (born 1983)

Serge Lofo
Personal information
- Full name: Serge Lofo Bongeli Senge
- Date of birth: 13 October 1983 (age 43)
- Place of birth: Kinshasa, Zaire
- Height: 1.82 m (6 ft 0 in)
- Position: Striker

Team information
- Current team: FC Mbemba

Youth career
- –1998: AS Paulino Kinshasa

Senior career*
Years	Team	Apps	(Gls)
1999–2000	AS Paulino Kinshasa	26	(12)
2001–2003	TP Mazembe	5	(2)
2004–2007	ASA	80	(54)
2008	Sagrada Esperança	16	(4)
2008–2010	AS Vita Club	39	(26)
2010	Rot Weiss Ahlen	0	(0)
2010–2011	FC Brussels	1	(0)
2011–2012	TP Mazembe		
2012–2013	Maccabi Netanya	14	(1)
2013–2015	Motema Pembe		
2015–2016	Diables Noirs		
2016–2017	FC Mbemba		
2017–2018	Sharks XI		
2018–	AS Nika		

International career
2004–2011	Congo DR	9	(2)
- * Club domestic league appearances and goals

Serge Lofo Bongeli Senge (born 13 October 1983) is a DR Congolese professional footballer who plays as a striker.

== Club career ==
Born in Kinshasa, Lofo began his career on the youth side with AS Paulino Kinshasa and was in 1999 promoted to the senior team. After three years with AS Paulino, he joined in winter 2002 to TP Mazembe and played there two season before in January 2004 he was scouted by Angolan top club Atlético Sport Aviação. He had three successful seasons with AS Aviação and signed in February 2007 for Sagrada Esperança, but after one season with the team and four years in Angola he returned to his hometown Kinshasa, who signed with AS Vita Club. On 5 February 2010, he left AS Vita Club together with Tychique Ntela Kalema to sign with the German club Rot Weiss Ahlen, but this was not a big breakthrough for Serge. On 6 September 2010, he signed a one-year contract with the Belgian club FC Brussels.

In 2013, he was arrested in Israel on suspicion of murder, but he was released after his friend confessed that he was the one that did the murder.

== International career ==
Lofo was capped nine times by the Congo DR national team, and scored 2 goals.

== Career statistics ==
#	Date	Venue	Opponent	Score	Result	Competition
1	11 January 2011	Cairo	Sudan	2-1	Win	2011 Nile Basin Tournament

== Honours ==
- 2008: Linafoot Top Scorer
