= Robertinho (footballer, born 1960) =

Brazilian football manager and former player

Personal information
- Full name: Roberto Oliveira Gonçalves do Carmo
- Date of birth: 22 June 1960 (age 66)
- Place of birth: Rio de Janeiro, Brazil
- Height: 1.73 m (5 ft 8 in)
- Position: Striker

Senior career*
Years	Team	Apps	(Gls)
1978–1982	Fluminense	66	(22)
1983	Flamengo	22	(5)
1984	Palmeiras	14	(2)
1985–1986	Flamengo	25	(6)
1987	Internacional	25	(2)
1987	Sport	23	(6)
1989	Atlético Mineiro	4	(2)
1989–1993	Nacional	50	(11)
1994–1995	SV Großenbach		

International career
1980	Brazil	1	(0)

Managerial career
- 1994–1995: SV Großenbach
- 1995–1997: Rio Branco (SP)
- 1998: Brasil de Pelotas
- 1999: São Bento
- 2002: Fluminense
- 2003: CRB
- 2003–2004: CSA
- 2004: America (RJ)
- 2005: Rio Branco (ES)
- 2005–2008: Stade Tunisien
- 2008–2009: Kazma
- 2009–2010: Al-Shamal
- 2010–2011: Hammam-Sousse
- 2011: Legião
- 2012–2013: Stade Gabèsien
- 2013–2014: Grombalia Sports
- 2014–2016: ASA
- 2017–2020: Rayon Sports
- 2020–2021: Gor Mahia
- 2021–2022: Vipers
- 2023: Simba
- 2024–2025: Rayon Sports
- 2025–2026: Jeddah
- * Club domestic league appearances and goals

Roberto Oliveira Gonçalves do Carmo (born 22 June 1960), known as Robertinho, is a Brazilian football coach and former player who was most recently the manager of Saudi Arabian club Jeddah. As a player, Robertinho played at both professional and international levels as a striker.

== Playing career ==
Born in Rio de Janeiro, Robertinho began his professional career with Fluminense in 1978, where he made 66 appearances and scored 22 goals over five seasons. He then moved to Flamengo in 1983, contributing to their Campeonato Brasileiro Série A victory that year, playing alongside legends such as Zico, Sócrates, and Júnior. He returned to Flamengo from 1985 to 1986, adding more appearances and goals.

In 1984, he played for Palmeiras, making 14 appearances and scoring 2 goals. The following year, he joined Internacional, with 25 appearances and 2 goals. In 1987, he transferred to Sport Recife, where he helped secure the 1987 Brazilian Championship, scoring 6 goals in 23 matches. His Brazilian career concluded with Atlético Mineiro in 1989, where he won the Campeonato Mineiro.

Abroad, Robertinho played for Nacional in Portugal from 1989 to 1993, scoring 11 goals in 50 appearances.

== International career ==
Robertinho earned one cap for the Brazil national team on 25 September 1980, in a friendly against Paraguay.

== Managerial career ==
Robertinho transitioned to management in 1994 with SV Großenbach, where he served as player-manager. He managed several Brazilian clubs in the late 1990s and early 2000s, including Rio Branco-SP, Brasil de Pelotas, São Bento, and a brief stint at Fluminense in 2002, where he won the Campeonato Carioca.

His career expanded internationally in 2005 with Stade Tunisien in Tunisia, followed by roles in Kuwait, Qatar, and other Tunisian clubs. In Africa, he managed ASA in Angola from 2014 to 2016. He achieved success with Rayon Sports in Rwanda, winning the Rwanda Premier League in 2018–19. In Kenya, he coached Gor Mahia from 2020 to 2021, though his tenure ended due to qualification issues.

In Uganda, he led Vipers to the Uganda Premier League title in 2021–22. He managed Simba in Tanzania in 2023, winning the Supercopa Tanzania, but was sacked after a heavy defeat.

After a second spell at Rayon Sports from 2024 to 2025, he was appointed manager of Jeddah in Saudi Arabia on 13 August 2025.

== Honours ==
=== As a player ===
Flamengo

- Campeonato Brasileiro Série A: 1983

Sport Recife

- Campeonato Brasileiro Série A: 1987

Atlético Mineiro

- Campeonato Mineiro: 1989

Brazil U21

- Toulon Tournament: 1980

=== As a manager ===
Fluminense

- Campeonato Carioca: 2002

Rayon Sports

- Rwanda Premier League: 2018–19

Vipers

- Uganda Premier League: 2021–22

Simba

- Supercopa Tanzania: 2022–23
