= Estádio dos Imbondeiros =

Sports venue in Soyo, Angola

- Interactive map of Estádio dos Imbondeiros
- Full name: Estádio Dos Embondeiros
- Address: Soyo; Angola
- Coordinates: 6.21661°S 12.37656°E
- Capacity: 3,000
- Type: Multi-use
- Surface: Grass

Estádio Imbomdeiro is a multi-use stadium in Soyo, Angola. It is currently used mostly for football matches and serves as the home of Académica Petróleo Kwanda Soyo. The stadium holds 3,000 people.
