= Manuel Costa (footballer) =

Angolan footballer (born 1989)

Personal information
- Full name: Manuel Gaspar Costa
- Date of birth: 30 December 1989 (age 36)
- Place of birth: Angola
- Position: Midfielder

Team information
- Current team: ASA

Senior career*
Years	Team	Apps	(Gls)
2010–2015	ASA		
2016	Benfica Luanda	18	(0)
2017	Kabuscorp	22	(0)
2018–	ASA		

International career^{‡}
2012–	Angola	16	(1)
- * Club domestic league appearances and goals as of 8 June 2018 ‡ National team caps and goals as of 8 June 2018

Manuel Gaspar Costa (born 30 December 1989) is an Angolan footballer who plays as a midfielder.
