= Fofana (Angolan footballer) =

Angolan footballer (born 1982)

Personal information
- Full name: Pedro Cassunda Domingos
- Date of birth: April 3, 1982 (age 44)
- Place of birth: Angola
- Position: Midfielder

Team information
- Current team: Primeiro de Agosto Luanda

International career
| Years | Team | Apps | (Gls) |
| 2004–2007 | Angola | 10 | (0) |

Pedro Cassunda Domingos known as Fofana (born April 3, 1982) is an Angolan former football player. He has played for Angola national team.

== National team statistics ==
Angola national team
| Year | Apps | Goals |
|---|---|---|
| 2004 | 3 | 0 |
| 2005 | 1 | 0 |
| 2006 | 5 | 0 |
| 2007 | 1 | 0 |
| Total | 10 | 0 |
