= Jacinto Pereira =

Angolan footballer (born 1974)

Personal information
- Full name: Jacinto Pereira
- Date of birth: December 10, 1974 (age 51)
- Place of birth: Luanda, Angola
- Height: 1.88 m (6 ft 2 in)
- Position: Defender

Senior career*
Years	Team	Apps	(Gls)
1995–1996	Primeiro de Maio		
2000–2006	ASA		

International career
2000–2006	Angola	15	(0)
- * Club domestic league appearances and goals

Jacinto Pereira (born December 10, 1974, in Luanda) is a retired Angolan football defender. He last played for ASA in the Girabola.

== International career ==
Jacinto was on the 2006 African Cup of Nations squad for Angola.

== National team statistics ==
Angola national team
Year	Apps	Goals
2000	3	0
2001	0	0
2002	0	0
2003	0	0
2004	5	0
2005	5	0
2006	2	0
Total	15	0
