= Papy Lukata Shumu =

Congolese footballer (born 1978)

Papy-Shumu Lukata
Personal information
- Full name: Papy-Shumu Lukata
- Date of birth: April 23, 1978 (age 48)
- Place of birth: Kinshasa, DR Congo
- Height: 1.79 m (5 ft 10 1/2 in)
- Position: Goalkeeper

Senior career*
| Years | Team | Apps | (Gls) |
| 2001–2002 | TP Mazembe | 23 | (0) |
| 2003–2008 | ASA | 89 | (0) |
| 2009–2010 | Petro Atlético | 24 | (0) |

International career
| 1996–2004 | DR Congo | 18 | (0) |
- * Club domestic league appearances and goals

Papy-Shumu Lukata (born April 23, 1978, in Kinshasa) is a Congolese football player.

== Career ==
He left in January 2009 his club ASA to sign for league rival Petro de Luanda. Lukata played in the CAF Champions League with Petro Atlético in 1996 and 2010.

== International career ==
He was part of the Congolese 2004 African Nations Cup team, who finished bottom of their group in the first round of competition, thus failing to secure qualification for the quarter-finals. Lukata was dismissed from the team for indiscipline following the tournament.
