= Yamba Asha =

Angolan footballer (born 1976)

Personal information
- Full name: João Osvaldo Yamba Asha
- Date of birth: 31 July 1976 (age 50)
- Place of birth: Luanda, Angola
- Height: 1.77 m (5 ft 10 in)
- Position: Left back

Senior career*
Years	Team	Apps	(Gls)
1995–1996	1º de Maio		
2000–2006	AS Aviação		
2006	Östers	4	(0)
2007–2011	Petro Atlético		
2012–2013	AS Aviação	19	(0)
2015	Domant	2	(0)
2015–2016	Rec da Caála	21	(0)

International career
2000–2009	Angola	76	(1)
- * Club domestic league appearances and goals

Yamba Asha João (born 31 July 1976) is an Angolan retired footballer who played as a defender.

== Career ==
Asha played for AS Aviação in his homeland and is a member of the Angola national team, collecting 76 caps by the end of 2009.

However, the left-back was excluded from their 2006 FIFA World Cup party, since he was banned by FIFA for nine months for failing a drugs test following a World Cup qualifier against Rwanda in October 2005.

He was recalled for an African Nations Cup qualifier against Swaziland in September 2006.

== Career statistics ==
Appearances and goals by national team and year
National team	Year	Apps	Goals
Angola	2000	4	0
Angola	2001	12	0
Angola	2002	4	0
Angola	2003	7	0
Angola	2004	12	0
Angola	2005	10	0
Angola	2006	2	0
Angola	2007	8	0
Angola	2008	12	1
Angola	2009	5	0
Total		76	1

Scores and results list Angola's goal tally first, score column indicates score after each Yamba Asha goal.

List of international goals scored by Yamba Asha
No.	Date	Venue	Opponent	Score	Result	Competition
1	8 June 2008	Stade Général Seyni Kountché, Niamey, Niger	Niger	2–1	2–1	2010 FIFA World Cup qualification

== See also ==
- List of doping cases in sport
