= Rats (footballer) =

Angolan footballer

Personal information
- Full name: Ambrósio Amaro Manuel Pascoal
- Date of birth: 5 May 1977 (age 49)
- Place of birth: Angola
- Position: Midfielder

International career
| Years | Team | Apps | (Gls) |
| 2003–2004 | Angola | 5 | (0) |

Ambrósio Amaro Manuel Pascoal best known as Rats, (born 5 May 1977) is a retired Angolan football player. He has played for Angola national team.

== National team statistics ==
Angola national team
| Year | Apps | Goals |
|---|---|---|
| 2003 | 1 | 0 |
| 2004 | 4 | 0 |
| Total | 5 | 0 |
