= Académica Petróleo Kwanda Soyo =

Angolan football club

Académica do Soyo
- Full name: Académica Petróleo Kwanda Soyo
- Founded: 22 January 1987; 39 years ago
- Ground: Estádio dos Imbondeiros; Soyo, Angola
- Capacity: 3,000
- Chairman: Tomás João Pedro (mandate until 2028)
- Manager: n/a
- League: Segundona
- 2014: Withdrew
Home colours	Away colours

Académica Petróleo Kwanda Soyo, best known as Académica do Soyo, is an Angolan football club based in Soyo, in the province of Zaire. They play their home games at the Estádio dos Imbondeiros. The club was relegated from the Angolan Premier Division, Girabola, at the end of the 2007 championship.

A court decision issued in 2018 determined the club's assets, including the stadium and head-office, to be seized.

== History ==
=== Origins: sport at the Kwanda Base (1984–1985) ===
The club's origins trace back to 1984, when a sports initiative was established for the recreational benefit of workers from the various companies based at Kwanda Island, near Soyo. The managing company of the Kwanda logistics base, Delong Hersent, led by its director Dr. João dos Santos (a Portuguese national), was the main driving force behind the project.

The team, named Base do Kwanda, was active in three disciplines: eleven-a-side football, futsal and basketball. Its players not only competed within the base but also lived in the villages of Soyo and represented their neighbourhood clubs — among them Kimpuanza, 1 de Maio, Saúde, TGFA, Tigres, Maquisards and 14 de Abril.

=== First competitive steps (1986) ===
In 1986, the Kwanda Base team entered the Soyo Municipal Football Championship for the first time. That same year, the futsal and basketball sections expanded beyond the base, playing against outside clubs such as the Navy (Marinha de Guerra) and Saúde. Notable players at this stage included Pioca, Moepo and Maria. Despite a competitive debut, the team did not win the championship.

=== Recruitment, controversy and foundation (1987) ===
Following the 1986 campaign, the Kwanda Base management began recruiting the best players identified during the competition, offering employment at Delong Hersent in exchange. This generated resentment across Soyo's local clubs, which lost several key players, and led to a general assembly of all sportspeople in the municipality.

The assembly took place on 22 January 1987 and resulted in the decision to create a single unified club to represent Soyo at provincial and national level. The new club was born from the merger of the historic Académica do Soyo (by then renamed Kimpuanza) and the Base do Kwanda, taking the name Académica Petróleos do Kwanda Soyo. The project was conceived with a social mission: the physical, spiritual and mental development of the youth of Soyo.

=== Rise to prominence (1988–1992) ===
From 1988 the club competed regularly and reinforced its squad with players from the Democratic Republic of the Congo, most notably Bakubá and Charles. Académica became the dominant force in Soyo's municipal championships.

In 1991–92, the club entered the promotion play-off for the 2nd National Division, held in Gabela, Kwanza Sul Province, and won the competition — earning promotion to the 2nd Division for the 1993 season.

=== Interruption by civil war (1992–1996) ===
The renewed outbreak of the Angolan Civil War prevented the club from competing in the 2nd Division. Leadership of the club passed from Dr. João dos Santos to Daniel Bertin, who oversaw the transition from a workers' team to a community club. The Kwanda Base was closed between 1993 and 1995 due to the conflict.

=== Restructuring and return (1996) ===
In 1996, the club was formally restructured following a proposal submitted to Sonangol, accompanied by its first official statutes. These defined that the President of the General Assembly should be Sonangol's Regional Director and the club president should be the head of the Kwanda Base. In practice, the base chief declined the presidency, and Dr. Bundy was appointed club president, with Engineer Rodolfo de Aguiar as vice-president. Kwanda, Lda. assumed the chairmanship of the General Assembly.

The club resumed competition at provincial level and later entered the national promotion play-offs. A new generation of talented local players emerged, with Mabiong among the most prominent. Over time the General Assembly presidency passed through engineers Manoel Vicente and Sian Gabílio — both deputy directors-general of Sonangol — before Kwanda, Lda. resumed the role in accordance with the club's statutes.

=== Girabola era (2003–2012) ===
Académica reached the Girabola (Angolan Premier Division) and remained a top-flight club for nearly a decade, competing across multiple seasons. The club was first relegated at the end of the 2007 season, returned to the Girabola after winning the Segundona in 2007–08, and was again relegated after the 2011–12 season.

=== Legal difficulties and present (2018–) ===
In 2018, a court ruling ordered the seizure of the club's assets, including the Estádio dos Imbondeiros and the club's headquarters.

Tomás João Pedro currently serves as club president, with a mandate running until 2028.

== Honours ==
=== Domestic ===
- Soyo Municipal Championship: multiple titles (1988–1992)
- Segundona (2nd Division): 2002–03, 2004–05, 2007–08
- 2nd National Division Promotion Play-off: 1992 (Gabela, Kwanza Sul)

== Performance in CAF competitions ==
- CAF Confederation Cup: 1 appearance

2010 – First Round

== Manager history ==
(Angola) Pedro Luvana Sekele
(Angola) Agostinho Tramagal	(Mar 2004)	–	(Nov 2004)
(Angola) Alberto Cardeau	(Jan 2005)	–
(Angola) João Pintar		–	(Mar 2006)
(Angola) Afonso Kondi		–	(May 2007)
(Angola) Kito Ribeiro	(May 2007)	–
(Brazil) Rogério Pinto China	(Mar 2008)	–	(Feb 2009)
(Angola) Raúl Kinanga		–	(Nov 2009)
(Angola) Romeu Filemon	(Jan 2010)	–	(Oct 2010)
(Angola) Agostinho Tramagal	(Mar 2011)	–	(Nov 2012)
(Angola) Ernesto Castanheira		–	(Jul 2013)
(Angola) Mateus Domingos	(2014)	–

== See also ==
- Girabola
- Gira Angola
