= Jamba (footballer) =

Angolan footballer (born 1977)

Personal information
- Full name: Joao Pereira
- Date of birth: 10 July 1977 (age 49)
- Place of birth: Benguela, Angola
- Height: 1.82 m (5 ft 11 1/2 in)
- Position: Defender

Team information
- Current team: AS Aviacao

Senior career*
Years	Team	Apps	(Gls)
1996–1997	1º de Maio		
1997–2007	ASA		
2007	Petro Atlético		
2008–2010	AS Aviacao		

International career^{‡}
1998–2009	Angola	58	(1)
- * Club domestic league appearances and goals as of 21 June 2006 ‡ National team caps and goals as of 21 June 2010

João Pereira (born 10 July 1977 in Benguela), is a retired Angolan footballer. He last played for Atlético Sport Aviação.

== Career ==
Jamba is an archetype of old fashioned defending. He is known for playing reliably and consistently.

== International career ==
The central back is a former member of the national team, and was called up to the 2006 World Cup. He has played in 29 straight international competitions for Angola, making him a leader on an otherwise young club. In April 2006, his performances were acknowledged when he was voted Angola's best home-based player in a national radio poll.

== Background ==
His nickname, "Jamba," means "Elephant" in Umbundu, a language spoken in southern Angola.

== National team statistics ==
Angola national team
Year	Apps	Goals
1998	1	0
1999	0	0
2000	0	0
2001	0	0
2002	0	0
2003	4	0
2004	11	0
2005	10	0
2006	17	1
2007	8	0
2008	3	0
2009	4	0
Total	58	1
