= S.L. Benfica (Lubango) =

Angolan football club

Benfica do Lubango
- Full name: Sport Lubango e Benfica
- Founded: 27 February 1932; 93 years ago
- Ground: Estádio 11 de Novembro; Lubango, Angola
- Capacity: 14,000
- Chairman: Jacques da Conceição
- Manager: A indicar
- League: Segundona
- 2018/19: 3rd
Home colours	Away colours

Sport Lubango e Benfica, and best known as Benfica do Lubango, is an Angolan football club based in Lubango. They play their home games at the Estádio Nossa Senhora do Monte.

Benfica do Lubango was established as the 16th affiliate of Sport Lisboa e Benfica. The first chairman to be elected was Eduardo Gomes de Albuquerque e Castro.

Following the country's independence in 1975 and an attempt by the communist regime to erase all traces of colonial rule (even from sports), the club, which had been created as an affiliate to S.L. Benfica, was ordered to change its name and therefore became known as Desportivo da Chela, as it participated in the first edition of the country's post-independence premier league.

== Manager history and performance ==
Season	Coach	L2	L1	C	Coach	L2	L1	C
1980	(Angola) Job Cipriano							
1981	(Angola) Damião Pinto				(Bulgaria) Nicolas Bosilov			
1982	(Angola) Domingos Inguila				(Angola) António Felix			
1984	(Angola) António Felix				(Angola) Nelo Amaro			
1985	(Angola) João Machado							
1986	(Angola) Zé do Pau				(Angola) Pepé & Malé			
1987	(Angola) Arsénio Ribeiro							
1992	(Angola) Zé do Pau							
1995	(Angola) Eduardo Laurindo							
2000	(Angola) Zé do Pau							
2001	(Angola) Carlos Queirós							
2002	(Angola) Carlos Queirós							
2004	(Angola) João Machado				(Angola) Horácio Géu			
2006	(Angola) Romeu Filemon							
2007	(Angola) Romeu Filemon							
2008	(Angola) Gonçalo Arsénio				(Angola) Alberto Cardeau			
2009
2010	(Angola) Alberto Cardeau				(Angola) Patrick Kodia			
2011	(Angola) Lacerda Chipongue							
2012	(Angola) Jorge Nito							
2013	(Angola) Jorge Nito							
2014	(Angola) Jorge Nito							
2015	(Angola) Lacerda Chipongue							
2019	(Angola) Jorge Nito							

== See also ==
- Girabola
- Gira Angola
