= Atlético Sport Aviação =

Angolan football club

ASA
- Full name: Atlético Sport Aviação
- Nickname: Os Aviadores
- Founded: 1 April 1953; 73 years ago
- Ground: Estádio da Cidadela; Luanda, Angola
- Capacity: 40,000
- Chairman: José Luís Prata
- Manager: António Jorge Tchitula
- League: Segundona
- 2026: 2th, (serie-A)
Home colours	Away colours

Atlético Sport Aviação, best known as ASA, was a football club from Luanda, Angola.

The club was founded in 1953 by a group of workers from TAAG's predecessor DTA. Mr. Jacinto Medina was the first chairman.

Before Angola's independence, the club was known as Atlético Sport Aviação. After independence, it was called Desportivo da TAAG, named after its major sponsor, the Angolan Airlines. In 1992, the club's name was reverted to its original ASA.

The club won its first title, the Angolan Cup, in 1995. Two players from ASA represented Angola at their first World Cup in 2006: Jamba and Love.

== Achievements ==
- Angolan League: 3
  - 2002, 2003, 2004.
  - 1965, 1966, 1967, 1968 (colonial champions)
- Angolan Cup: 3
  - 1995, 2005, 2010.
- Angolan SuperCup: 6
  - 1996, 2003, 2004, 2005, 2006, 2011.

== Recent seasons ==
Atlético Sport Aviação's season-by-season performance since 2011:

Overall match statistics
Season	Pld	W	D	L	GF	GA	GD	%
2016	32	11	3	18	28	44	–16	0.625
2015	31	10	8	13	32	40	–8	0.532

Classifications
LG	AC	SC	CL	CC
13th	R16			
9th	PR			

Top season scorers
Player	LG	AC	SC	CL	CC	T
Nelito	8	0				8
Guelor	8	?				8

- PR = Preliminary round, 1R = First round, GS = Group stage, R32 = Round of 32, R16 = Round of 16, QF = Quarter-finals, SF = Semi-finals

== Performance in CAF competitions ==
- CAF Champions League: 4 appearances

2003 – Group Stage (Top 8)
2004 – Second Round
2005 – Second Round
2006 – Preliminary Round

- CAF Confederation Cup: 2 appearances

2005 – Intermediate Round
2011 – Preliminary Round

- CAF Cup: 3 appearances

1993 – Semi-Finals
2001 – Second Round
2002 – First Round

- CAF Cup Winners' Cup: 3 appearances

1982 – First Round
1994 – First Round
1996 – First Round

== Stadium ==
The club plays their home matches at Estádio da Cidadela, which has a maximum capacity of 35,000 people.

== Players and staff ==
=== Staff ===
Name	Nat	Pos
Technical staff
António Jorge Tchitula	(Angola)	Head coach
Leocádio Kamulemba	(Angola)	Assistant coach
Vítor Chiculungo	(Angola)	Goalkeeper coach
Medical
Aurélio Mavungula	(Angola)	Physio
Evaristo Ndulu	(Angola)	Masseur
Management
José Luís Prata	(Angola)	Chairman

== Manager history ==
Season	Coach	S	L	C	Coach	S	L	C	Coach	S	L	C
1979	(Angola) Chico Ventura											
1980	(Angola) Chico Ventura											
1981	(Angola) Chico Ventura											
1982	(Croatia) Zlatko Škorić †											
1983	(Angola) Chico Ventura †											
1984	(Angola) Chico Ventura †											
1985	(Angola) Chico Ventura †											
1986	(Angola) Maló & Geovety											
1987	(Angola) Severino Cardoso Smica				(Bulgaria) Bogomil Bijev							
1988	(Angola) Chico Ventura				(Angola) Avelino Neto Maló				(Portugal) Nina Serrano			
1989	(Portugal) Nina Serrano											
1990	(Portugal) Nina Serrano				(Angola) Napoleão Brandão †				(Angola) Sabino Silva			
1991	(Angola) Sarmento				(Angola) Joka Santinho							
1992	(Serbia) Veselin Jelušić Vesko											
1993	(Serbia) Veselin Jelušić Vesko											
1994	(Serbia) Dušan Condić											
1995	(Angola) João Machado			1995 Angola Cup								
1996	(Angola) João Machado	1996 Angola SuperCup			(Angola) José Kilamba							
1997	(Angola) José Kilamba											
1998	(Brazil) Djalma Cavalcante †											
1999	(Cape Verde) Carlos Alhinho †											
2000	(Cape Verde) Carlos Alhinho †				(Portugal) Bernardino Pedroto							

Season	Coach	S	L	C	Coach	S	L	C	Coach	S	L	C
2001	(Portugal) Bernardino Pedroto											
2002	(Portugal) Bernardino Pedroto	2002 Girabola										
2003	(Portugal) Bernardino Pedroto	2003 Angola SuperCup	2003 Girabola									
2004	(Portugal) Bernardino Pedroto	2004 Angola SuperCup	2004 Girabola									
2005	(Portugal) Bernardino Pedroto	2005 Angola SuperCup		2005 Angola Cup								
2006	(Portugal) Bernardino Pedroto	2006 Angola SuperCup										
2007	(Portugal) Manuel Fernandes											
2008	(Portugal) Manuel Fernandes											
2009	(Brazil) Marinho Peres				(Angola) José Miguel Minhonha							
2010	(Portugal) José Dinis			2010 Angola Cup								
2011	(Portugal) José Dinis	2011 Angola SuperCup										
2012	(Portugal) José Dinis											
2013	(Angola) Ricardo Almeida				(Angola) José Miguel Minhonha							
2014	(Angola) Ernesto Castanheira				(Angola) Samy Matias							
2015	(Brazil) R. Gonçalves Robertinho											
2016	(Brazil) R. Gonçalves Robertinho				(Angola) José de Carvalho Corolla							
2017	(Angola) João Machado				(Angola) Abílio Amaral				(Angola) José Saraiva			
2018	(Portugal) José Dinis											
2018–19	(Portugal) José Dinis											

== Other sports ==
- ASA Basketball
- ASA Handball

== See also ==
- Girabola
- Gira Angola
