= List of C.R.D. Libolo players =

This article is about the list of Clube Recreativo e Desportivo do Libolo players. Clube Recreativo e Desportivo do Libolo is an Angolan football (soccer) club based in Calulo, Angola and plays at the Estádio Patrice Lumumba. The club was established in 1942.

== 2020–2021 ==
C.R.D. Libolo players 2020–2021

| Nat | # | Nick | Name | A | P | P.T. | Total Apps & Gls | | |
| Nat | # | Nick | Name | A | P | 2021 | Total Apps & Gls | | |
| Nat | # | Nick | Name | A | P | ^{C} | ^{S} | ^{A} | ^{G} |
|---|---|---|---|---|---|---|---|---|---|
| (Angola) | 8 | Almeida | José Xavier Fernando | 28 | MF | 2021 | | | |
| (Angola) | 18 | Barrezó | Joveth Adão | 28 | DF | 2021 | | | |
| (Angola) | 35 | Bebo | Osvaldo Adelino José | 20 | FW | 2021 | | | |
| (Angola) | 2 | Bráulio | Bráulio Manuel | 22 | DF | 2021 | | | |
| (Angola) | 14 | Cabibi | Leonardo Manuel Isola Ramos | 29 | MF | 2021 | | | |
| (Angola) | 15 | Caneta | Pedro Manuel K. Ganga | 21 | MF | 2021 | | | |
| (Angola) | 16 | Dilson | Leonardo Bartolomeu Kamone | 24 | FW | 2021 | | | |
| (Angola) | 5 | Ézio | Ézio Nazareno Quinvula da Silva Pinto | 24 | DF | 2021 | | | |
| (Angola) | 28 | Fofó | Afonso Sebastião Cabungula | 27 | FW | 2021 | | | |
| (Angola) | 26 | Foguinho | Júlio Somacueje Baptista | 26 | FW | 2021 | | | |
| (Angola) | 10 | Francis | Francisco Marta Agostinho da Rosa | 28 | MF | 2021 | | | |
| (Angola) | 32 | Gilberto | Deivi Miguel Vieira | 20 | FW | 2021 | | | |
| (Angola) | 34 | Inoqui | Inoqui Paulo Cosme | 20 | MF | 2021 | | | |
| (Angola) | 4 | Kizombé | Alberto dos Santos Domingos | 30 | DF | 2021 | | | |
| (Angola) | 24 | Lopes | Lopes Mateus Simão | 33 | DF | 2021 | | | |
| (Angola) | 11 | Lukeba | António Lukeba | 28 | MF | 2021 | | | |
| (Angola) | 29 | Manaia | Valter Américo dos Santos Manaia | 40 | GK | 2021 | | | |
| (Angola) | 30 | Mona | Cipriano Cumba Rafael | 28 | MF | 2021 | | | |
| (Angola) | 22 | Mualucano | Augusto Monteiro Mualucano | 23 | GK | 2021 | | | |
| (Angola) | 23 | Nguedelamba | Paulino Gomes Nguendelamba | 23 | MF | 2021 | | | |
| (Angola) | 25 | Ning | Rodino Dumbo José | 26 | MF | 2021 | | | |
| (Angola) | 19 | Norberto | Kiatalua Tadeu Emous | 27 | MF | 2021 | | | |
| (Angola) | 6 | Pino | António Alberto Sumbo Luemba | 26 | DF | 2021 | | | |
| (Angola) | 13 | René | Kalemba René Baltazar | 28 | DF | 2021 | | | |
| (Angola) | 17 | Sténio | Sténio de Sá Miranda Simão | 27 | MF | 2021 | | | |
| (Angola) | – | Tadeu | | | | 2021 | | | |
| (Angola) | 12 | Toy | André Augusto Miranda Kongo | 33 | GK | 2021 | | | |
| (Angola) | 20 | Vado | Dorivaldo António Dias | 34 | FW | 2021 | | | |
| (Cape Verde) | 3 | Vally | Valdevindes Chantres Monteiro | 33 | DF | 2021 | | | |
| (Angola) | 7 | Viet | Inácio Maulitano Cassuque | 30 | MF | 2021 | | | |
| Years | | | | | | 2021 | | | |

== 2011–2020 ==
C.R.D. Libolo players 2011–2020

| Nat | Nick | Name | A | P | Z. Amaral | | M.G. | M.G. | JPC | JPC | Pedro Caravela | | | A.Makanga | | | André Macanga | | | | | | Total Apps & Gls | | | |
| Nat | Nick | Name | A | P | 2011 | 2012 | 2013 | 2014 | 2015 | 2016 | 2017 (5th) | | | 2018 (4th) | | | 2018–19 (8th) | | | 2019–20 | | | Total Apps & Gls | | | |
| Nat | Nick | Name | A | P | 1 | 1 | 8 | 1 | 1 | 3 | ^{#} | ^{A} | ^{G} | ^{#} | ^{A} | ^{G} | ^{#} | ^{A} | ^{G} | ^{#} | ^{A} | ^{G} | ^{S} | ^{A} | ^{G} | |
|---|---|---|---|---|---|---|---|---|---|---|---|---|---|---|---|---|---|---|---|---|---|---|---|---|---|---|
| (Angola) | Abdul | António Nzayinawo | 24 | DF | | | | | | | | | | 13 | ^{4} | ^{0} | → | | | | | | | | | |
| (Angola) | Adawa | Adawá Mokanga | 24 | MF | 16 | 16 | → | | | | | | | | | | | | | | | | | | | |
| (Angola) | Adilson Kamone | Leonardo Bartolomeu Kamone | – | FW | | | | | | | | | | 16 | ^{(1)} | ^{0} | 16 | ^{19(3)} | ^{3} | 16 | ^{7(4)} | ^{1} | | | | |
| (Angola) | Adilson Kivão | Adilson Ernesto Kivão | 24 | MF | | | | 30 | | 30 | | | | | | | | | | | | | | | | |
| (Angola) | Aguinaldo Veiga | Aguinaldo Policarpo Mendes da Veiga | 24 | FW | 19 | 10 | 10 | → | | | | | | | | | | | | | | | | | | |
| (Angola) | Alberto Munhelele | Alberto da Silva Munhelele | 26 | MF | 14 | → | | | | | | | | | | | | | | | | | | | | |
| (Angola) | Alexandre M'Futila | Alexandre Domingos Cristóvão M'Futila | 22 | FW | | | | → | 28 | → | | | | | | | | | | | | | | | | |
| (Argentina) | Andrés Madrid | Andrés David Madrid | 32 | MF | | → | 23 | → | | | | | | | | | | | | | | | | | | |
| (Angola) | Ary Oliveira | Ariclene Assunção Oliveira | 21 | DF | | 17 | 3 | → | | | | | | | | | | | | | | | | | | |
| (Democratic Republic of the Congo) | Atunako | Eboue Manzambi Atunako | | MF | | | | | | | → | | | 30 | ^{8(2)} | ^{0} | → | | | | | | | | | |
| (Angola) | Avelino Horácio | Avelino F. Horácio | | DF | | | | | | | | | | | | | 3 | ^{10(1)} | ^{2} | | | | | | | |
| (Angola) | Ayala | Mário Álvaro Agostinho | 30 | MF | | | | | | | → | | | 5 | ^{4(6)} | ^{1} | → | | | | | | | | | |
| (Angola) | Barrezó | Joveth Adão | 27 | DF | | | | | | | → | | | 18 | ^{22} | ^{1} | 18 | ^{6} | ^{0} | 18 | ^{4} | ^{1} | | | | |
| (Angola) | Belito Socola | Abelardo Gomes Socola | 22 | MF | | | | | | | → | | | 11 | ^{2(6)} | ^{0} | → | | | | | | | | | |
| (Angola) | Boka | Boka Nelson Filho | 29 | DF | | | → | 2 | | 16 | 2 | ^{4(3)} | ^{0} | → | | | | | | | | | | | | |
| (Angola) | Bota | Miguel João Canhanga | 32 | MF | → | 22 | → | | | | | | | | | | | | | | | | | | | |
| (Cape Verde) | Brito Furtado | Armindo Rodrigues Mendes Furtado | 29 | FW | | | | → | 7 | 7 | | | | | | | | | | | | | | | | |
| (Angola) | Cabibi Ramos | Leonardo Manuel Isola Ramos | – | MF | | | | | → | 17 | 17 | ^{2(7)} | ^{0} | → | | | | | | | | | | | | |
| (Angola) | Caneta | Pedro Manuel K. Ganga | 20 | MF | | | | | | | | | | | | | 31 | ^{(3)} | ^{0} | 31 | ^{2} | ^{0} | | | | |
| (Angola) | Carlitos Almeida | Carlos Miguel Gomes de Almeida | 29 | DF | → | 27 | 27 | 27 | 27 | 27 | 27 | ^{15(2)} | ^{0} | → | | | | | | | | | | | | |
| (Portugal) | Carlos Alves | Carlos Miguel Pereira Alves | 31 | DF | | | | | | | | | | → | | | 28 | ^{7} | ^{2} | | | | | | | |
| (Angola) | Celson Barros | Celson João Barros Costa | 32 | DF | | | | | → | 6 | 6 | ^{34(1)} | ^{1} | 6 | ^{6(2)} | ^{0} | | | | | | | | | | |
| (Angola) | Chara Costa | Fernando Agostinho da Costa | 36 | MF | | | | | | → | 4 | ^{16} | ^{1} | → | | | | | | | | | | | | |
| (Angola) | Chico Bunga | Carlos Francisco Diassonama Panzo Bunga | 24 | FW | | | → | 11 | 11 | → | | | | | | | | | | | | | | | | |
| (Angola) | Chico Caputo | Francisco Eduardo Gomes Caputo | 28 | DF | → | 6 | 6 | → | | | | | | | | | | | | | | | | | | |
| (Angola) | Chinho | João dos Santos de Almeida | 29 | MF | – | → | | | | | | | | | | | | | | | | | | | | |
| (Angola) | Correia | Osvaldo Ginga | 22 | MF | | | | | | | | | | | | | | | | 34 | ^{DNP} | | | | | |
| (Angola) | Cuca | José Semedo Vunge | 23 | MF | | | | | | | | | | → | | | 15 | ^{2(2)} | ^{0} | | | | | | | |
| (Cape Verde) | Dany Ribeiro | Daniel Mendes Ribeiro | 23 | FW | 25 | | | | | | | | | | | | | | | | | | | | | |
| (Angola) | Dany Satonho | Silas Daniel Satonho | 26 | MF | | | → | 10 | 10 | 10 | | | | | | | | | | | | | | | | |
| (Angola) | Dário Cardoso | Dário de Sousa Borges Cardoso | 35 | MF | → | 23 | 20 | 20 | 20 | 20 | 20 | ^{10(7)} | ^{0} | → | | | | | | | | | | | | |
| (Angola) | Depaiza | Estevão Manuel Quitocota Cahoco | 26 | DF | | | | | | → | 3 | ^{24(1)} | ^{1} | → | | | | | | | | | | | | |
| (France) | Diawara | Mamadou Diawara | 28 | FW | | | → | 24 | 24 | 24 | 24 | ^{19(13)} | ^{5} | → | | | | | | | | | | | | |
| (Brazil) | Donato | João Vitor Souza Donato | 23 | DF | | | | | | | | | | → | | | 27 | ^{13} | ^{1} | → | | | | | | |
| (Angola) | Eddie Afonso | Eddie Marcos Melo Afonso | 23 | DF | | | → | 18 | 18 | 18 | 18 | ^{15(1)} | ^{0} | → | | | | | | | | | | | | |
| (Angola) | Edinho | | | DF | – | | | | | | | | | | | | | | | | | | | | | |
| (Portugal) | Eduardo Simões | Eduardo Manuel Melico Simões | 31 | DF | | | 16 | | | | | | | | | | | | | | | | | | | |
| (Cameroon) | Edy Boyom | Edward Nicolas M'Boyom | 28 | DF | 29 | 4 | 4 | 4 | 4 | 4 | | | | | | | | | | | | | | | | |
| (Brazil) | Elton | Elton Charles Figueiredo da Silva | 34 | MF | | | | | | | | | | | | | → | | | 19 | ^{6(3)} | ^{1} | | | | |
| (Angola) | Enoque | Enoque Paulo Guilherme | 27 | DF | 5 | → | | | | | | | | | | | | | | | | | | | | |
| (Angola) | Erivaldo | Erivaldo Jorge Paulo Ferreira | 22 | MF | | | | | → | 19 | → | | | | | | | | | | | | | | | |
| (Angola) | Essien | Abel Armando Rodrigues | 20 | MF | | | | | | | | | | | | | | | | 32 | ^{DNP} | | | | | |
| (Angola) | Estevão Ferreira | Estevão Nassoma Ferreira | 21 | MF | | | | | | | | | | 6 | ^{(2)} | ^{0} | 6 | ^{2(4)} | ^{0} | → | | | | | | |
| (Angola) | Evandro Brandão | Evandro Elmer de Carvalho Brandão | 24 | FW | | | → | 9 | 9 | | | | | | | | | | | | | | | | | |
| (Angola) | Ézio | Ézio Nazareno Q. da S. Pinto | 23 | DF | | | | | | | | | | | | | | | | 5 | ^{4(1)} | ^{0} | | | | |
| (Brazil) | Fabrício Simões | Fabrício Santos Simões | 33 | FW | | | | | | → | 9 | ^{18(9)} | ^{10} | | | | | | | | | | | | | |
| (Angola) | Faustino Gonçalves | Faustino Jorge Gonçalves | 23 | DF | | | | | | | | | | 23 | ^{9} | ^{0} | → | | | | | | | | | |
| (Angola) | Fernando Feliciano | Fernando Feliciano | 22 | DF | | | | | | | | | | | | | | | | 33 | ^{DNP} | | | | | |
| (Portugal) | Fernando Silva | Fernando Dinarte Santos Silva | 32 | DF | 13 | 13 | | | | | | | | | | | | | | | | | | | | |
| (Cape Verde) | Figo | Osvaldo Tavares Oliveira | 31 | MF | | | | | | | 19 | ^{9(2)} | ^{3} | | | | | | | | | | | | | |
| (Angola) | Filhão | João Gomes de Oliveira | 24 | FW | | | | | | | | | | → | | | 14 | ^{2(8)} | ^{1} | → | | | | | | |
| (Angola) | Fofó | Afonso Sebastião Cabungula | 26 | FW | | | | | | | | | | | | | → | | | 28 | ^{12(4)} | ^{0} | | | | |
| (Angola) | Fredy Kulembe | Alfredo Kulembe Ribeiro | 26 | MF | | 11 | | | 16 | 16 | | | | | | | | | | | | | | | | |
| (Angola) | Fuky | Manuel Paulo David | 23 | DF | | | → | 21 | 21 | | | | | | | | | | | | | | | | | |
| (Angola) | Gelson | | | | | | | | | | | | | | | | | | | 22 | ^{DNP} | | | | | |
| (Angola) | Gênesis | Germano Cagiza Diogo | 19 | DF | 31 | | | | | | | | | | | | | | | | | | | | | |
| (Angola) | Geovany Campos | Geovany Manuel Abel Campos | 26 | MF | 7 | | | | | | | | | | | | | | | | | | | | | |
| (Angola) | Gomito Cassule | António Gonçalo Cassule | 31 | DF | 3 | 5 | 5 | 5 | → | | | | | | | | | | | | | | | | | |
| (Angola) | Gomito Fonseca | Nelson Sumbo Fonseca | 26 | DF | | | | | | → | 5 | ^{6} | ^{1} | → | | | | | | | | | | | | |
| (Angola) | Guilherme Garcia | Sebastião Guilherme Garcia | 27 | GK | → | 30 | → | | | | | | | | | | | | | | | | | | | |
| (Democratic Republic of the Congo) | Guy | Guy Mfingi Magema | 23 | DF | | | | | | | | | | 2 | ^{1(1)} | ^{0} | 2 | ^{1} | ^{0} | | | | | | | |
| (Angola) | Hélio Roque | Hélio José Lopes Roque | 32 | FW | | | | | | → | 10 | ^{3(4)} | ^{0} | | | | | | | | | | | | | |
| (Guinea) | Henri Camara | Henri Camara | 24 | MF | | 9 | 9 | | | | | | | | | | | | | | | | | | | |
| (Democratic Republic of the Congo) | Hervé Ndonga | Hervé Ndonga Mianga | 26 | MF | | | | | | | → | | | 27 | ^{11(2)} | ^{2} | | | | | | | | | | |
| (Angola) | Higino Julião | Ezequiel Paulo Julião | 23 | MF | | | | | | → | 30 | ^{15(20)} | ^{1} | → | | | | | | | | | | | | |
| (Angola) | Hugo Ndulo | João André Kuya Ndulo | 32 | MF | 4 | → | | | | | | | | | | | | | | | | | | | | |
| (Angola) | Ito | Mário Manuel de Oliveira | 23 | MF | | | | | → | 14 | 14 | ^{21(2)} | ^{0} | → | | | | | | | | | | | | |
| (Angola) | Jaime Linares | Jaime Miguel Linares | 37 | DF | | | | | → | 21 | 21 | ^{24(1)} | ^{0} | 21 | ^{10} | ^{1} | 21 | ^{16(1)} | ^{0} | | | | | | | |
| (Angola) | Jaredi | Jaredi Lopes Teixeira | 21 | FW | | | | | | | | | | 17 | ^{10(1)} | ^{1} | 17 | ^{21(5)} | ^{3} | → | | | | | | |
| (Angola) | Jean-Claude Amougou | Jean-Claude Amougou | 20 | MF | 23 | | | | | | | | | | | | | | | | | | | | | |
| (Angola) | Jó Paciência | Joaquim Cristóvão Paciência | 23 | FW | | | | | | | | | | | | | 28 | ^{3(3)} | ^{0} | → | | | | | | |
| (Angola) | João Martins | João Pedro Pinto Martins | 31 | FW | | → | 13 | → | | | | | | | | | | | | | | | | | | |
| (Angola) | João Ngongo | João Baptista Ngongo | 26 | GK | | | | | | | | | | | | | 1 | ^{12} | ^{0} | → | | | | | | |
| (Portugal) | João Tomás | João Henrique Pataco Tomás | 38 | FW | → | 7 | 7 | | | | | | | | | | | | | | | | | | | |
| (Portugal) | Josemar | Josemar Balanga Agostinho | 21 | FW | | | | | | | | | | 19 | ^{(2)} | ^{0} | | | | | | | | | | |
| (Angola) | Jotabé Silva | João Baptista da Silva | 33 | GK | | | | | | | | | | | | | → | | | 1 | ^{11} | ^{0} | | | | |
| (Republic of the Congo) | Kaya | Julsy Gitel Hermelin Boukama-Kaya | 26 | MF | | | → | 23 | 23 | 23 | 23 | ^{32(5)} | ^{7} | 10 | ^{25(3)} | ^{0} | 10 | ^{21(1)} | ^{5} | → | | | | | | |
| (Angola) | Kizombé | Alberto dos Santos Domingos | 29 | DF | | | | | | | | | | | | | 4 | ^{14} | ^{1} | 4 | ^{10} | ^{0} | | | | |
| (Angola) | Kuagica | Kuagica Sebastião Bondo David | 27 | DF | | | | → | 25 | 25 | 25 | ^{20(3)} | ^{3} | → | | | | | | | | | | | | |
| (Angola) | Lambito | Osvaldo Vasco Carlos | 31 | GK | | | | | | | → | | | 12 | ^{DNP} | | → | | | 12 | ^{4} | ^{0} | | | | → |
| (Portugal) | Lameirão | Edgar Manuel Abreu Lameirão Baptista | 32 | DF | → | 19 | → | | | | | | | | | | | | | | | | | | | |
| (Angola) | Landu | Landu Mavanga | 27 | GK | → | 12 | 12 | 12 | 22 | 22 | 22 | ^{26} | ^{0} | → | | | | | | | | | | | | |
| (Brazil) | Leandro Love | Leandro Rodrigues da Silva | 35 | MF | | | | | | | | | | | | | → | | | 9 | ^{17(1)} | ^{8} | | | | |
| (Angola) | Libe | Edmilson Manuel | 22 | DF | | | | | | | | | | | | | | | | 36 | ^{DNP} | | | | | |
| (Angola) | Liliano | Liliano Pedro | 23 | FW | | | | | | | | | | | | | → | | | 14 | ^{16} | ^{6} | | | | → |
| (Angola) | Lito Panzo | Pedro José Panzo | 22 | MF | 21 | → | | | | | | | | | | | | | | | | | | | | |
| (Angola) | Lopes Simão | Lopes Mateus Simão | 32 | DF | | | | | | | → | | | 24 | ^{27} | ^{0} | 24 | ^{14} | ^{0} | 24 | ^{15} | ^{0} | | | | |
| (Angola) | Luís Cardoso | Luís Cardoso | 23 | MF | | | | | | 30 | 28 | ^{DNP} | | 28 | ^{DNP} | | | | | | | | | | | |
| (Angola) | Lukeba | António Lukeba | 27 | MF | | | | | | | | | | | | | → | | | 11 | ^{7(7)} | ^{0} | | | | |
| (Brazil) | Luiz Phellype | Luiz Phellype Luciano Silva | 23 | FW | | | | | → | 9 | → | | | | | | | | | | | | | | | |
| (Democratic Republic of the Congo) | Lukose | Lukose Mandika | 31 | DF | 15 | → | | | | | | | | | | | | | | | | | | | | |
| (Democratic Republic of the Congo) | Lusadisu | Guy Lusadisu Basisila | 38 | MF | | | | | | | | | | | | | | | | 15 | ^{DNP} | | | | | |
| (Angola) | Mabululu Paciência | Agostinho Cristóvão Paciência | 24 | FW | | → | 19 | → | | | | | | | | | | | | | | | | | | |
| (Angola) | Machado, Manuel | Manuel António Machado | 26 | DF | 17 | | | | | | | | | | | | | | | | | | | | | |
| (Brazil) | Magrão | Daniel de Jesus dos Santos | 35 | FW | | | | | | | | | | 9 | ^{13} | ^{14} | 9 | ^{2(1)} | ^{0} | | | | | | | |
| (Senegal) | Maguette | El Hadji Maguette Seye | 32 | GK | | | | | | | → | | | 1 | ^{10} | ^{0} | | | | | | | | | | |
| (Angola) | Maludi | Maludi Francisco Caxala | 28 | DF | | | | | | | | | | | | | → | | | 23 | ^{6} | ^{0} | | | | → |
| (Angola) | Manaia | Valter Américo dos Santos Manaia | 39 | GK | | | 30 | | 12 | 12 | 12 | ^{2} | ^{0} | 29 | ^{2} | ^{0} | 29 | ^{8} | ^{0} | 29 | ^{7(1)} | ^{0} | | | | |
| (Mozambique) | Manú Lopes | Manuel de Jesus Lopes | 31 | MF | 26 | 26 | 25 | → | | | | | | | | | | | | | | | | | | |
| (Angola) | Marco Airosa | Marco Ibraim de Sousa Airosa | 36 | DF | | | | | | | | | | → | | | 30 | ^{21} | ^{1} | 30 | ^{11} | ^{1} | | | | |
| (Angola) | Mariano Luvunga | Mariano Ribeiro Luvunga | 30 | MF | | | | | | → | 16 | ^{15(1)} | ^{0} | 16 | ^{3(3)} | ^{0} | | | | | | | | | | |
| (Angola) | Mateus Domingos | Mateus Gaspar Domingos | 25 | MF | | → | 23 | → | | | | | | | | | | | | | | | | | | |
| (Portugal) | Mauro Almeida | Mauro Alexandre da Silva Almeida | 33 | DF | | | | → | 5 | → | | | | | | | | | | | | | | | | |
| (Cameroon) | Mbongo | Emmanuel Mbongo Ewangue | 22 | FW | | | → | 19 | 19 | | | | | | | | | | | | | | | | | |
| (Angola) | Meda Nsiandamba | Vidal Miguel Paulo Nsiandamba | 23 | MF | | | | → | 15 | | | | | | | | | | | | | | | | | |
| (Angola) | Mendes Ginga | Mário Olegário Pascoal Ginga | 31 | MF | 9 | → | | | | | | | | | | | | | | | | | | | | |
| (Angola) | Mig | Zacarias dos Milagres Sambambi | 22 | GK | | | → | – | 12 | | | | | | | | | | | | | | | | | |
| (Angola) | Miguel Quiame | Miguel Geraldo Quiame | 27 | DF | | | | | | | → | | | 17 | ^{7} | ^{0} | | | | | | | | | | |
| (Angola) | Milex | Lúvia João Mateus | 29 | MF | | → | 22 | → | | | | | | | | | | | | | | | | | | |
| (Angola) | Mingo Sanda | Domingos Fernando Sanda | 33 | DF | | | → | 6 | 6 | → | | | | | | | | | | | | | | | | |
| (Angola) | Miro Pereira | Belmiro da Conceição Pereira | 28 | DF | 20 | → | | | | | | | | | | | | | | | | | | | | |
| (Angola) | Mona | Cipriano Cumba Rafael | 27 | MF | | | | | | | | | | | | | | | | 30 | ^{5} | ^{1} | | | | |
| (Angola) | Mussa | Joaquim Gaspar Teixeira | 29 | FW | | | | | | | | | | → | | | 25 | ^{11(8)} | ^{2} | 2 | ^{2(1)} | ^{0} | | | | → |
| (Angola) | Mussumari | Gabriel Frederico Mussumari | 25 | DF | → | 2 | 2 | → | | | | | | | | | | | | | | | | | | |
| (Angola) | Nandinho Macamo | Wilson Fernandes Augusto Macamo | 34 | MF | | | | | | 11 | 11 | ^{27(11)} | ^{4} | → | | | 11 | ^{20(2)} | ^{1} | → | | | | | | |
| (Angola) | Natael | Natael Paulo Masuekama | 23 | DF | | | | → | 2 | 2 | → | | | | | | | | | | | | | | | |
| (Angola) | Ndié | Diogo Maziano Kembi | 27 | MF | | | | | | | → | | | 20 | ^{15(1)} | ^{0} | 20 | ^{23(1)} | ^{0} | 20 | ^{17} | ^{0} | | | | → |
| (Democratic Republic of the Congo) | Ndoumbia | | | FW | | | | | | | | | | 25 | ^{3(4)} | ^{0} | | | | | | | | | | |
| (Angola) | Nelito Cachimalim | Manuel Chanda Cachimalim | 29 | MF | | | | | | → | 26 | ^{10(4)} | ^{0} | 26 | ^{10(1)} | ^{0} | 26 | ^{2(4)} | ^{0} | 26 | ^{1(1)} | ^{0} | | | | → |
| (Angola) | Nilton Paulo | Nilton Jorge Paulo | 28 | GK | | 29 | 29 | 29 | 29 | 29 | 29 | ^{3} | ^{0} | | | | | | | | | | | | | |
| (Angola) | Norberto Emous | Kiatalua Tadeu Emous | – | MF | | | | | | | → | | | 4 | ^{5(9)} | ^{0} | → | | | | | | ↑ | | | |
| (Portugal) | Nuno Silva | Nuno Miguel Moreira da Cunha Ribeiro e Silva | 27 | FW | | → | 10 | → | | | | | | | | | | | | | | | | | | |
| (Angola) | Nzau Lutumba | Nzau Miguel Lutumba | 27 | DF | | | | | | | → | | | 3 | ^{13(1)} | ^{1} | → | | | | | | | | | |
| (Angola) | Paizinho Calenga | Hercânio Chitaca Calenga | 35 | FW | | | | | | → | 15 | ^{15(14)} | ^{11} | 15 | ^{16(5)} | ^{2} | → | | | | | | | | | |
| (Angola) | Panilson | Feliciano Felisberto Javela | 30 | DF | | | | | | | | | | → | | | 23 | ^{18} | ^{1} | → | | | | | | |
| (Angola) | Pataca | Bernardo Fernando Pataca da Silva | 28 | MF | | | | → | 26 | 26 | → | | | 14 | ^{7} | ^{0} | → | | | | | | | | | |
| (Portugal) | Pedrito Marques | Pedro Alexandre Mendes Marques | 26 | MF | | | 18 | 28 | → | | | | | | | | | | | | | | | | | |
| (Portugal) | Pedro Mendes | Pedro Rafael Amado Mendes | 21 | MF | | → | 16 | 16 | → | | | | | | | | | | | | | | | | | |
| (Portugal) | Pedro Ribeiro | Pedro Manuel Mendes Ribeiro | 30 | DF | | → | 21 | → | | | | | | | | | | | | | | | | | | |
| (Angola) | Pino | António Alberto Sumbo Luemba | 25 | MF | | | | | | | | | | | | | → | | | 6 | ^{8(5)} | ^{0} | | | | |
| (Angola) | Pitchu | Tubi Landu | 31 | GK | 22 | → | | | | | | | | | | | | | | | | | | | | |
| (Angola) | Quinzinho Nzamba | Joaquim André Nzamba | 28 | MF | 27 | 15 | 15 | 15 | → | | | | | | | | | | | | | | | | | |
| (Angola) | Rasca | Maieco Domingos Henrique António | 31 | FW | 24 | 24 | 24 | | | | | | | | | | | | | | | | | | | |
| (Angola) | René | Kalemba René Baltazar | 27 | DF | | | | | | | | | | | | | → | | | 13 | ^{13} | ^{0} | | | | |
| (Angola) | Ricardo Batista | Ricardo Jorge Cecília Batista | 30 | GK | | | | → | 1 | 1 | 1 | ^{10} | ^{0} | | | | | | | | | | | | | |
| (Portugal) | Ruben Gouveia | Rúben Sílvio Lino Gouveia | 28 | MF | → | 25 | 25 | → | | | | | | | | | | | | | | | | | | |
| (Angola) | Rudy | Carlos Wilson Cachicote da Rocha | 26 | MF | | | | → | 13 | → | | | | | | | | | | | | | | | | |
| (Angola) | Rui Maurício | Rui Carlos Tavares Maurício | 28 | DF | | | 8 | | | | | | | | | | | | | | | | | | | |
| (Angola) | Sanches | | | | – | | | | | | | | | | | | | | | | | | | | | |
| (Ivory Coast) | Siaka | Siaka Bamba | 30 | MF | | | | | | | | | | → | | | 13 | ^{14(1)} | ^{1} | → | | | | | | |
| (Cape Verde) | Sidnei | Sidnei dos Santos Reis Mariano | 34 | MF | → | 8 | 8 | 8 | 8 | 8 | 8 | ^{31(1)} | ^{0} | 8 | ^{26} | ^{3} | 8 | ^{24(1)} | ^{3} | 8 | ^{15(1)} | ^{1} | | | | → |
| (Angola) | Silva Anato | António da Silva Anato | 26 | MF | | | | | | | | | | | | | → | | | 10 | ^{18(1)} | ^{4} | | | | → |
| (Angola) | Stélvio Cruz | Stélvio Rosa da Cruz | 22 | MF | 22 | → | | | | | | | | | | | | | | | | | | | | |
| (Angola) | Tonilson | António Geraldo | 18 | MF | | | | | | | | | | | | | | | | 35 | ^{DNP} | | | | | |
| (Angola) | Totó | Osvaldo Cornélio Paulo Candeia | 28 | MF | → | 18 | → | | | | | | | | | | | | | | | | | | | |
| (Angola) | Toy Kongo | André Augusto Miranda Kongo | – | GK | 12 | → | | | | | | | | | | | | | | | | | | | | |
| (Angola) | Vado Dias | Dorivaldo António Dias | 26 | MF | 17 | 14 | 14 | → | | | | | | | | | | | | | | | | | | |
| (Angola) | Valdinho | Valdimir Ferraz Matias Nunes | 26 | FW | | | | → | 17 | | | | | | | | | | | | | | | | | |
| (Angola) | Valdir | Hugo Valdir Romão Cardoso | 28 | DF | → | 3 | | | | | | | | | | | | | | | | | | | | |
| (Cape Verde) | Vally | Valdevindes Chantres Monteiro | 32 | DF | | | | | | | | | | | | | → | | | 3 | ^{16} | ^{0} | | | | |
| (Angola) | Vidinho | Victor Pedro Nangue | 22 | DF | | | | | | | | | | | | | | | | 25 | ^{4} | ^{0} | | | | |
| (Angola) | Viet | Inácio Maulitano Cassuque | 29 | MF | | | | | | → | 7 | ^{25(5)} | ^{3} | 7 | ^{23(2)} | ^{1} | 7 | ^{14(8)} | ^{1} | 7 | ^{4} | ^{0} | | | | |
| (Brazil) | Viola | Luis Gustavo Silva | 32 | FW | 9 | 20 | 20 | | | | | | | | | | | | | | | | | | | |
| (Angola) | Wilson Alegre | Wilson Edgar Pereira Alegre | 35 | GK | | | | | | | → | | | 22 | ^{16} | ^{0} | 22 | ^{10} | ^{0} | | | | | | | |
| (Brazil) | Wíres | Wíres José de Souza | 34 | MF | | | | 3 | 3 | 3 | → | | | | | | | | | | | | | | | |
| (Angola) | Yuri Dala | Yuri Mabi Dala | 28 | DF | 28 | | | | | | | | | | | | | | | | | | | | | |
| (Angola) | Zé Kalanga | Paulo Baptista Nsimba | 28 | MF | 10 | | | | | | | | | | | | | | | | | | | | | |
| Years | | | | | 2011 | 2012 | 2013 | 2014 | 2015 | 2016 | 2017 | | | 2018 | | | 2018–19 | | 28 | 2019–20 | | 25 | | | | |

== 2006–2010 ==
C.R.D. Libolo players 2006–2010

| Nat | Nick | Name | A | P | R.P. | L.M. | L.M. | M.B. | M.B. | |
| Nat | Nick | Name | A | P | 2006 | 2007 | 2008 | 2009 | 2010 | |
| Nat | Nick | Name | A | P | 2 | 2 | 3 | 2 | 6 | |
|---|---|---|---|---|---|---|---|---|---|---|
| (Angola) | Alex Mateus | Alex Eganda Mateus | | DF | | | 4 | 4 | | |
| (Angola) | Álvaro, José | José Manuel Álvaro | | GK | | → | 30 | 30 | | |
| (Angola) | Amâncio | Amâncio José Pinto Fortes | 19 | MF | | | → | – | | |
| (Angola) | André Cunha | André Gustavo Cunha | 30 | DF | | | – | 2 | | |
| (Angola) | Ângelo Manuel | Ângelo Sebastião Manuel | 27 | GK | | | → | 1 | 1 | |
| (Angola) | Baloy | | | | 2006 | | | | | |
| (Angola) | Bino | | | | 2006 | | | | | |
| (Angola) | Bocandé | Carlos Bernardo Fuma | | DF | | | 27 | | | |
| (Angola) | Brazuca | Walter Inácio Furtado Vieira | | MF | | | 33 | | | |
| (Angola) | Brito | | | | 2006 | | | | | |
| (Angola) | Buá | Luvumbo Lourenço Pedro | 20 | MF | | → | 9 | → | | |
| (Angola) | Capoco | Luciano José Capoco | 27 | GK | | → | 12 | 12 | | |
| (Angola) | Chano | | | DF | 2006 | 2007 | 25 | | | |
| (Angola) | Chinho | João dos Santos de Almeida | – | MF | | | | → | 15 | ↑ |
| (Angola) | Chiquinho | | | | 2006 | | | | | |
| (Angola) | Cláudio | | | | 2006 | | | | | |
| (Angola) | Dady Kutonda | Zeco Kutonda | | MF | 2006 | 2007 | 14 | → | | |
| (Angola) | David Mendonça | David Chicola Mendonça | | MF | 2006 | 2007 | 29 | | | |
| (Angola) | Edinho | | | DF | | | 20 | | | |
| (Angola) | Edson Nobre | Edson de Jesus Nobre | 30 | FW | | | | | 11 | |
| (Angola) | Edson | | | MF | 2006 | 2007 | 22 | | | |
| (Angola) | Enoque Guilherme | Enoque Paulo Guilherme | – | DF | | | | → | 2 | ↑ |
| (Angola) | Figueiredo, Paulo | Paulo José Lopes de Figueiredo | 37 | MF | | | 6 | 6 | | |
| (Angola) | Fuxito | Afonso Ramilde Sampaio Henriques | 28 | FW | | | → | 21 | → | |
| (Angola) | Gazeta Victor | Augusto Maneco Victor | 34 | MF | | → | 11 | 11 | | |
| (Brazil) | Gefferson Goulart | Gefferson da Silva Goulart | 31 | MF | | | 10 | 10 | | |
| (Angola) | Geovany Campos | Geovany Manuel Abel Campos | – | MF | | | | | 16 | ↑ |
| (Angola) | Gil Martins | Gil Martins dos Santos | 27 | FW | | | | → | – | → |
| (Angola) | Gomito Cassule | António Gonçalo Cassule | – | DF | | | → | 3 | 3 | ↑ |
| (Angola) | Hélder Soares | Hélder Peliganga Domingos Soares | 28 | DF | | | → | 23 | 23 | |
| (Angola) | Johnson Macaba | Johnson Monteiro Pinto Macaba | 31 | FW | | | → | – | → | |
| (Angola) | Jojó Mendes | Humberto Jorge Garcia Mendes | 39 | MF | | | → | 19 | | |
| (Angola) | Julião | | | DF | | | 13 | | | |
| (Brazil) | Juninho | Orlando Rodrigues de Melo Junior | 21 | MF | | | | 15 | | |
| (Angola) | Kadima Silva | Kadima Adão Santos da Silva | | FW | | | 18 | → | | |
| (Angola) | Kikí | Garcia Afonso André | 25 | GK | 2006 | 2007 | 1 | → | | |
| (Angola) | Kuagica | Kuagica Sebastião Bondo David | – | DF | | | | 26 | | ↑ |
| (Angola) | Lebo Lebo | António Lebo Lebo | 32 | DF | | | – | 5 | | |
| (Angola) | Lito Panzo | Pedro José Panzo | 19 | MF | | | 31 | | | |
| (Brazil) | Luciano Lima | Luciano Soares de Lima | 26 | FW | | 2007 | 7 | | | |
| (Angola) | Machado, Manuel | Manuel António Machado | – | DF | | | – | 17 | 17 | ↑ |
| (Angola) | Malengue | Malengue Paulo Fernandes da Costa | | DF | | | 2 | | | |
| (Angola) | Manpela | | | | 2006 | | | | | |
| (Angola) | Mateus Santos | Mateus Agostinho Luís dos Santos | 29 | MF | | | 8 | 8 | 8 | |
| (Angola) | Mendes Ginga | Mário Olegário Pascoal Ginga | – | MF | | | → | 16 | 16 | ↑ |
| (Angola) | Miller | | | MF | | | 28 | | | |
| (Angola) | Minguito | | | DF | | | 15 | | | |
| (Angola) | Miranda | | | | | | 15 | | | |
| (Angola) | Miro Pereira | Belmiro da Conceição Pereira | – | DF | | | – | 20 | 20 | ↑ |
| (Angola) | Nacho | | | | 2006 | | | | | |
| (Angola) | Nandinho Macamo | Wilson Fernandes Augusto Macamo | – | MF | | | → | 14 | 14 | → |
| (Angola) | Osvaldo | Osvaldo Manuel Saldanha | 26 | FW | | | | 10 | 10 | |
| (Angola) | Passi | | | | 2006 | | | | | |
| (Angola) | Pedy | Abel Gongo José Lemos | 24 | MF | | | → | 18 | 18 | → |
| (Angola) | Pitchu Landu | Tubi Landu | – | GK | | | | | 22 | ↑ |
| (Angola) | Quinzinho | Joaquim André Nzamba | – | MF | | | | → | 4 | ↑ |
| (Angola) | Rasca | Maieco Domingos Henrique António | – | FW | | | → | 24 | 24 | ↑ |
| (Angola) | Rats | Ambrósio Amaro Manuel Pascoal | 32 | MF | | | 17 | 17 | | |
| (Brazil) | Reginaldo | Reginaldo Silva dos Santos | 30 | FW | | 2007 | 9 | 9 | 9 | |
| (Angola) | Ricardo | | | | | 2007 | | | | |
| (Cameroon) | Romi | Jean-Charles Ndjom Kouang | 26 | MF | | | | → | 7 | |
| (Brazil) | Serginho Francisco | Sérgio Henrique Francisco | 25 | FW | | → | | 7 | → | |
| (Brazil) | Thiago | Thiago de Souza Coutinho | 25 | DF | | | 5 | | | |
| (Angola) | Tidy | | | FW | | | 16 | | | |
| (Angola) | Toizinho Silva | António José Pereira da Silva | 28 | DF | 2006 | → | 24 | → | | |
| (Angola) | Toy Kongo | André Augusto Miranda Kongo | – | GK | | | | | 12 | ↑ |
| (Angola) | Vadinho Campos | Hamlet Divalde Sousa Campos | 23 | DF | | → | 21 | → | | |
| (Angola) | Vunda | Celso José Pascoal | | FW | | | 19 | | | |
| (Angola) | Xaile | | | | 2006 | | | | | |
| (Angola) | Yuri Dala | Yuri Mabi Dala | – | DF | | | | 13 | 13 | ↑ |
| (Angola) | Zé Kalanga | Paulo Baptista Nsimba | – | MF | | | | | 8 | ↑ |
| Years | | | | | 2006 | 2007 | 2008 | 2009 | 2010 | |
