= 2008 Angola Cup =

Tournament details
- Country: Angola
- Dates: 23 Jul – 11 Nov 2008
- Teams: 18

Final positions
- Champions: Santos FC
- Runners-up: Recreativo Libolo
- CAF Confederation Cup: Santos FC (winner); Libolo (runner-up)

Tournament statistics
- Matches played: 17

The 2008 Taça de Angola was the 27th edition of the Taça de Angola, the second most important and the top knock-out football club competition in Angola, following the Girabola. Santos Futebol Clube de Angola beat Recreativo do Libolo 1–0 in the final, to secure its 1st title.

The winner and the runner-up qualified to the CAF Confederation Cup.

== Stadia and locations ==
Location of the 2008 Angola Cup teams

P	Team	Home city	Stadium	Capacity	2007	Current	P
5	Académica do Lobito	Lobito	Estádio do Buraco	3,000	DNP	R16	n/a
5	ASA	Luanda	Estádio da Cidadela	60,000	QF	R16	▼1
6	Baixa de Cassanje	Malanje	Estádio 1º de Maio	3,500	DNP	PR	n/a
5	Benfica de Luanda	Luanda	Estádio dos Coqueiros	8,000	Runner-Up	R16	▼3
5	Benfica do Lubango	Lubango	Estádio da N.Sra do Monte	14,000	QF	R16	▼1
5	Bravos do Maquis	Luena	Estádio Mundunduleno	4,300	R16	R16	Steady
4	Desportivo da Huíla	Lubango	Estádio do Ferrovia	15,000	R16	QF	▲1
4	Interclube	Luanda	Estádio 22 de Junho	7,000	R16	QF	▲1
4	Kabuscorp	Luanda	Estádio dos Coqueiros	8,000	DNP	QF	n/a
5	Petro de Luanda	Luanda	Estádio da Cidadela	50,000	SF	R16	▼2
5	Petro do Huambo	Huambo	Estádio dos Kurikutelas	17,000	R16	R16	Steady
4	Primeiro de Agosto	Luanda	Estádio da Cidadela	50,000	SF	QF	▼1
3	Primeiro de Maio	Benguela	Estádio Edelfride Costa	6,000	Champion	SF	▼3
5	Progresso	Luanda	Estádio dos Coqueiros	8,000	DNP	R16	n/a
2	Recreativo do Libolo	Calulo	Estádio Municipal de Calulo	10,000	R16	Runner-Up	▲3
3	Sagrada Esperança	Dundo	Estádio Sagrada Esperança	8,000	QF	SF	▲1
1	Santos FC	Luanda	Estádio dos Coqueiros	8,000	R16	Champion	▲4
6	Sporting de Cabinda	Cabinda	Estádio do Tafe	25,000	DNP	PR	n/a

== Championship bracket ==
Preliminary Rounds; 23 Jul 2008
Wed, 23 Jul 2008
Progresso	1
Baixa Cassanje	0
Wed, 23 Jul 2008
Académica Lobito	4
Sporting Cabinda	1

1/16 Finals; 9/10 Aug 2008
Sun, 10 Aug 2008
Progresso	1
Santos FC	2
Sun, 10 Aug 2008 (pen)
Interclube	6
Bravos Maquis	4
Sun, 10 Aug 2008 (pen)
Petro Huambo	4
1º de Maio	6
Sat, 9 Aug 2008
ASA	0
Desp da Huíla	1
Sun, 10 Aug 2008
Petro Luanda	0
Rec do Libolo	1
Sat, 9 Aug 2008 (pen)
1º de Agosto	6
Benfica Lubango	5
Académica Lobito	1
Kabuscorp	2
Sun, 10 Aug 2008 Walkover
Sagrada Esperança	3
Benfica Luanda	0

Quarterfinals; 30 Aug 2008
Thu, 4 Sep 2008 (pen)
Santos FC	3
Interclube	1
Sat, 30 Aug 2008
1º de Maio	1
Desportivo Huíla	0
Sat, 30 Aug 2008
Rec do Libolo	3
1º de Agosto	2
Sat, 30 Aug 2008
Kabuscorp	2
Sagrada	3

Semifinals; 8 Nov 2008
Sat, 8 Nov 2008 (pen)
Santos FC	4
1º de Maio	2
Sat, 8 Nov 2008 (pen)
Rec do Libolo	7
Sagrada Esperança	5

Final; 11 Nov 2008
Tue, 11 Nov 2008 (a.e.t.)
Santos FC	2
Rec do Libolo	1

== Preliminary rounds ==
Wed, 23 Jul 2008 PR	Progresso	1–0	Baixa Cassanje	Luanda
15:00 WAT (UTC+1)	Pingo 66'			Stadium: Campo de S. Paulo

Wed, 23 Jul 2008 PR	Académica Lobito	0–0 (4–1 p)	Sporting Cabinda	Lobito
15:00 WAT (UTC+1)				Stadium: Buraco

== Round of 16 ==
Sat, 9 Aug 2008 R16	Académica Lobito	1–2	Kabuscorp
15:00 WAT (UTC+1)

Sat, 9 Aug 2008 R16	ASA	0–1	Desportivo Huíla	Luanda
15:00 WAT (UTC+1)				Stadium: Coqueiros

Sat, 9 Aug 2008 R16	1º de Agosto	2–2 (a.e.t.) (4–3 p)	Benfica Lubango	Luanda
15:00 WAT (UTC+1)	Love ?', ?'		Mbinda; Zé Bula	Stadium: Cidadela; Referee: Figueiredo da Costa

Sun, 10 Aug 2008 R16	Progresso	1–2	Santos FC	Luanda
15:30 WAT (UTC+1)	Micki 30'		9' Miloy; 60' Man Loyde	Stadium: Campo de S. Paulo; Referee: Inácio Rangel

Sun, 10 Aug 2008 R16	Interclube	1–1 (a.e.t.) (5–3 p)	Bravos Maquis	Luanda
15:00 WAT (UTC+1)	Traoré		83' Castro	Stadium: 22 de Junho; Referee: Paulo Talaia
	Penalties
	Romi (penalty scored); Dione (penalty scored); Lucas (penalty scored); Yuri (penalty scored); Nuno (penalty scored)		(penalty scored) (penalty scored) (penalty scored); (penalty missed) Paulito

Sun, 10 Aug 2008 R16	Petro Huambo	2–2 (a.e.t.) (2–4 p)	1º de Maio	Huambo
15:00 WAT (UTC+1)	Korando 12'; Jorginho 68'		21' Coimbra; 51' Fita	Stadium: Kurikutelas; Referee: Venâncio Daniel
	Penalties
	Jorginho (penalty scored); Dudú (penalty scored); Tchitchi (penalty missed); Ngueno (penalty missed)		(penalty scored) Hélder; (penalty scored) Vemba; (penalty scored) Marcos; (penalty scored) Calala; (penalty missed) Coimbra

Sun, 10 Aug 2008 R16	Petro Luanda	0–1	Rec do Libolo	Luanda
15:00 WAT (UTC+1)			79' Reginaldo	Stadium: Cidadela; Referee: Romualdo Baltazar; Jerson Emiliano, Sérgio Sebastião

Sun, 10 Aug 2008 R16	Sagrada	Walkover	Benfica Luanda	Dundo
15:30 WAT (UTC+1)				Stadium: Sagrada Esperança

== Quarter-finals ==
Sat, 30 Aug 2008 QF	1º de Maio	1–0	Desportivo Huíla	Benguela
15:00 WAT (UTC+1)	William 52'			Stadium: Edelfride Costa; Referee: Figueiredo da Costa

Sat, 30 Aug 2008 QF	Kabuscorp	2–3	Sagrada	Luanda
15:00 WAT (UTC+1)	Mungusso 23'; Adolfo 25'		14' Jó; 47' Sotto; 55' Nando	Stadium: Coqueiros; Referee: Venâncio Daniel

Sat, 30 Aug 2008 QF	Rec do Libolo	3–2	1º de Agosto	Calulo
15:00 WAT (UTC+1)	Machado 41'; Buá 66', 70'		14' Fofaná; 65' Joãozinho	Stadium: Municipal de Calulo; Referee: João Bastos; Pedro Canombo, Abías Moisés

Thu, 4 Sep 2008 QF	Santos FC	0–0 (a.e.t.) (3–1 p)	Interclube	Luanda
15:00 WAT (UTC+1)	Chinho (yellow card)	Report	(yellow card) Fabrício; (yellow card) Wetshi	Stadium: Coqueiros; Referee: Pedro dos Santos; Júlio Lemos, Sebastião da Silva
	Penalties
	Rasca (penalty scored); C.Caputo (penalty scored); Fissy (penalty scored)		(penalty scored) Kito; (penalty missed) Lucas; (penalty missed) Dione; (penalty missed) Romi

== Semi-finals ==
Sat, 8 Nov 2008 SF	Santos FC	0–0 (a.e.t.) (4–2 p)	1º de Maio	Namibe
15:30 WAT (UTC+1)				Stadium: Joaquim Morais; Referee: Romualdo Baltazar
	Penalties
	Chinho (penalty scored); Rasca (penalty scored); Miloy (penalty scored); Solange (penalty scored)		(penalty scored) Vemba; (penalty scored) Márcio

Sat, 8 Nov 2008 SF	Rec do Libolo	2–2 (a.e.t.) (5–3 p)	Sagrada	Calulo
15:00 WAT (UTC+1)	Reginaldo 6', 39'		50' Albano; 70' (o.g.) Machado	Stadium: Municipal de Calulo; Referee: Fernando Mação
	Penalties
	Reginaldo (penalty scored); Figueiredo (penalty scored); Miller (penalty scored); Nilo (penalty scored); Rats (penalty scored)		(penalty scored) Vilar; (penalty scored) Nsingui; (penalty scored) Stopirrá

== Final ==
11 November 2008
16:00

Santos FC	1–0 (a.e.t.)	Rec do Libolo
Manucho 90+'	Report

Estádio dos Coqueiros, Luanda
Attendance: 2.500
Referee: Muluta Prata

Santos	Libolo

GK	–	(Democratic Republic of the Congo) Thierry	Booked
RB	–	(Angola) Solange
CB	–	(Angola) Enoque	Booked
CB	–	(Angola) Tchebe	Booked
LB	–	(Angola) Edú	Booked
RM	–	(Angola) Zezão		(substituted off) 76'
CM	–	(Angola) Miloy
CM	–	(Angola) Milex
LM	–	(Angola) Fissy		(substituted off) 90+4'
CF	–	(Angola) Chinho (c)
CF	–	(Zambia) Rasca	Sent off (straight red)
Substitutions:
CF	–	(Angola) Manucho	Booked	(substituted on) 76'
DF	–	(Angola) Ribeiro		(substituted on) 90+4'
–	–
Manager:
(Angola) Fernando Morais

GK	12	(Angola) Capoco
RB	21	(Angola) Vadinho
CB	–	(Angola) Lebo Lebo
CB	–	(Angola) Machado
LB	–	(Angola) Miro
RM	–	(Brazil) André Cunha		Substituted off
CM	17	(Angola) Rats (c)
CM	31	(Angola) Lito
LM	10	(Brazil) Gefferson		(substituted off) 83'
CF	11	(Angola) Gazeta		(substituted off) 62'
CF	9	(Brazil) Reginaldo
Substitutions:
MF	6	(Angola) Figueiredo		(substituted on) 83'
MF	9	(Angola) Buá	Booked	(substituted on) 62'
MF	28	(Angola) Miller		Substituted on
Manager:
(Brazil) Luís Mariano

Assistant referees:
Luciano António
Zeferino Muanda

2008 Angola Football Cup winner

1st title

Squad:
Tsherry (GK)
Buanza, Chico Caputo, Edú, Enoque, Fissy, Ribeiro, Solange (DF)
Black, Maninho Loide, Milex, Miloy, Paz, Tchebe, Zé Manuel, Zezão (MF)
Loló, Manucho Barros, Mauro, Rasca, Sawú (FW)
Jorge Humberto Chaves (Head Coach)

== See also ==
- 2008 Girabola
- 2009 Angola Super Cup
- 2009 CAF Confederation Cup
- Santos FC players
- Recreativo do Libolo players
