= 2009 Angola Super Cup =

Santos FC	Petro de Luanda
Taça Angola	Girabola
3	2
- on aggregate

First leg
Santos FC	Petro de Luanda
2	0
- Date: 4 February 2009
- Venue: Estádio dos Coqueiros, Luanda
- Referee: Pedro dos Santos

Second leg
Petro de Luanda	Santos FC
2	1
- Date: 7 February 2009
- Venue: Estádio da Cidadela, Luanda
- Referee: Romualdo Baltazar

The 2009 Supertaça de Angola (22nd edition) was contested by Petro de Luanda, the 2008 Girabola champion and Santos FC, the 2008 Angola Cup winner. On home court, Santos beat Petro 2–0 to secure their 1st title as the away match ended in a 2-1 win for Petro.

== Match details ==
=== First leg ===
Wed, 4 February 2009
15:00

Santos FC	2–0	Petro de Luanda
Zezão 2'; Manucho 46'	Report

Estádio dos Coqueiros, Luanda
Attendance: 4,000
Referee: Pedro dos Santos

Santos	Petro

GK	30	(Democratic Republic of the Congo) Tsherry
RB	–	(Angola) Solange
CB	–	(Angola) Enoque
CB	3	(Angola) Txebe		Substituted off
LB	–	(Angola) Edú
RM	–	(Angola) Fissy		(substituted off) 46'
CM	–	(Angola) Miloy	Booked
CM	–	(Angola) Milex
LM	–	(Angola) Zezão
CF	–	(Angola) Chinho
CF	–	(Angola) Manucho Barros		Substituted off
Substitutions:
FW	–	(Angola) Didí		(substituted in) 46'
MF	16	(Angola) Buá		Substituted in
FW	–	(Angola) Mauro		Substituted in
Manager:
(Angola) Mário Calado

GK	12	(Democratic Republic of the Congo) Papy
RB	13	(Angola) Renato
CB	3	(Angola) Sérgio
CB	25	(Angola) Locó	Booked	Substituted off
LB	3	(Angola) Cassoma
RM	11	(Angola) Job
DM	8	(Angola) Chara
CM	10	(Cape Verde) Humberto		(substituted off) 45'
LM	11	(Angola) Mabiná
CF	14	(Kenya) Wanga		(substituted off) 46'
CF	27	(Angola) David
Substitutions:
MF	18	(Angola) Malamba		(substituted in) 45'
FW	9	(Angola) Stanick		(substituted in) 46'
FW	16	(Angola) Joca		Substituted in
Manager:
(Portugal) Bernardino Pedroto

Assistant referees:
Júlio Lemos
Denilson Gourgel
Fourth official:

=== Second leg ===
Sat, 7 February 2009
15:00

Petro de Luanda	2–1	Santos FC
David 22'; Chara 87'	Report	57' Buá

Estádio da Cidadela, Luanda
Attendance: 3,000
Referee: Romualdo Baltazar

Petro	Santos

GK	1	(Angola) Lamá
RB	17	(Angola) Jamuana	Booked	Substituted off
CB	3	(Angola) Sérgio
CB	7	(Cameroon) Etah
LB	15	(Angola) Yamba Asha
RM	11	(Angola) Job	Booked
CM	6	(Angola) Nelo		Substituted off
DM	8	(Angola) Chara (c)
LM	11	(Angola) Mabiná
CF	19	(Niger) Moussa
CF	27	(Angola) David
Substitutions:
FW	9	(Angola) Stanick		Substituted in
FW	18	(Angola) Malamba		Substituted in
Manager:
(Portugal) Bernardino Pedroto

GK	30	(Democratic Republic of the Congo) Tsherry	Booked
RB	–	(Angola) Enoque
CB	–	(Angola) Solange
CB	–	(Angola) Fissy
LB	–	(Angola) Edú		(substituted off) 52'
RM	–	(Angola) Chinho (c)
CM	–	(Angola) Miloy	Booked
CM	–	(Angola) Zezão
LM	3	(Angola) Txebe
CF	–	(Angola) Milex	Booked
CF	–	(Angola) Manucho Barros		(substituted off) 85'
Substitutions:
MF	–	(Angola) Buá	Booked	(substituted in) 52'
FW	–	(Angola) Didí		(substituted in) 85'
Manager:
(Angola) Mário Calado

Assistant referees:
Inácio Cândido
Jerson dos Santos
Fourth official:

2009 Angola Football Super Cup winner

Santos Futebol Clube de Angola
1st title

Squad: Bebucho, Buá, Buanza, Chico Caputo, Chinho, Didí, Edú, Enoque, Fissy, Guilherme, Guto, Jotabé, Maninho Loide, Manucho Barros, Mauro, Micki, Milex, Miloy, Paz, Rainho, Ribeiro, Rui, Sawú, Solange, Tchebe, Toyzinho, Tsherry, Zezão
Head coach: Mário Calado

== See also ==
- 2008 Girabola
- 2008 Angola Cup
- Santos FC players
- Petro de Luanda players
