= 2007 Girabola =

Girabola
- Season: 2007 (Feb 14–Oct 21)
- Champions: Interclube
- Relegated: Académica do Lobito; Primeiro de Maio; Kabuscorp
- 2008 CAF Champions League: Interclube (winner); 1º de Agosto (runner-up)
- 2008 CAF Confederation Cup: Petro de Luanda (3rd place)
- Matches: 182
- Goals: 372 (2.04 per match)
- Top goalscorer: Manucho Gonçalves (15 goals)
- Biggest home win: Sag Esp 6–1 Atl Nam (23 Sep 2007)
- Biggest away win: Juv Mox 0–4 Santos (14 Feb 2007); Aca Soy 0–4 ASA (24 Jun 2007)
- Highest scoring: Sag Esp 6–1 Atl Nam (23 Sep 2007)

The 2007 Girabola was the 29th season of the top-tier football league in Angola. The season ran from 14 February to 21 October 2007. Primeiro de Agosto were the defending champions.

The league comprised 14 teams, the bottom three of which were relegated to the 2008 Gira Angola.

Petro Atlético de Luanda were crowned champions, while Académica do Soyo, Atlético do Namibe and Juventude do Moxico were relegated. Manucho Gonçalves of Petro de Luanda finished as the top scorer with 14 goals.

== Changes from the 2006 season ==
Relegated: Bravos do Maquis, Progresso do Sambizanga, Sporting de Cabinda
Promoted: Juventude do Moxico, Petro do Huambo, Santos FC

Locations of the 2007 Girabola teams

== League table ==
Pos	Team	Pld	W	D	L	GF	GA	GD	Pts	Qualification or relegation
1	Interclube (C)	26	16	7	3	32	17	+15	55	Qualification for Champions League
2	Primeiro de Agosto	26	16	6	4	41	14	+27	54	Qualification for Champions League
3	Petro de Luanda	26	15	5	6	43	25	+18	50	Qualification for Confederation Cup
4	Sagrada Esperança	26	10	10	6	36	26	+10	40	
5	ASA	26	10	10	6	27	19	+8	40	
6	Petro do Huambo	26	11	6	9	26	20	+6	39	
7	Benfica do Lubango	26	11	6	9	31	26	+5	39	
8	Desportivo da Huíla	26	10	8	8	25	24	+1	38	
9	Primeiro de Maio	26	9	9	8	23	23	0	36	
10	Benfica de Luanda	26	9	8	9	22	21	+1	35	
11	Santos FC	26	8	3	15	23	34	−11	27	
12	Académica do Soyo (R)	26	5	8	13	15	29	−14	23	Relegation to Provincial stages
13	Atlético do Namibe (R)	26	4	4	18	20	41	−21	16	Relegation to Provincial stages
14	Juventude do Moxico (R)	26	0	6	20	8	53	−45	6	Relegation to Provincial stages

Updated to match(es) played on 21 October 2007. Source: Girabola.com
Rules for classification: 1) Points; 2) Head-to-head points; 3) Head-to-head goal difference; 4) Goal difference; 5) Goals scored; 6) Fair-play points; 7) Play-off.
(C) Champions; (R) Relegated

== Results ==
Home \ Away	ACS	ASA	ATN	BEN	BLB	DES	INT	JUV	PET	PHU	PRI	MAI	SAG	SAN
Académica do Soyo	—	0–4	2–1	0–0	1–2	1–0	1–0	1–1	0–1	1–0	0–3	1–1	0–0	2–0
ASA	0–0	—	1–0	0–2	1–0	1–0	1–2	1–1	0–0	1–1	0–2	0–0	2–2	1–0
Atlético do Namibe	1–1	0–3	—	0–0	1–2	0–2	0–1	4–0	2–3	1–0	0–1	2–3	0–0	1–1
Benfica de Luanda	1–0	0–2	2–1	—	2–1	2–0	1–1	2–0	3–2	3–0	0–2	0–0	1–1	0–1
Benfica do Lubango	1–0	2–1	1–0	0–2	—	0–1	0–1	4–0	3–2	0–1	1–1	3–0	2–1	3–1
Desportivo da Huíla	3–2	1–1	1–0	1–1	0–0	—	2–2	2–0	0–2	1–0	1–1	1–0	1–1	2–1
Interclube	1–0	1–0	1–2	2–0	2–2	0–0	—	2–0	1–0	2–1	0–3	0–0	1–1	2–0
Juventude do Moxico	0–0	0–1	0–1	1–1	0–1	0–1	0–2	—	0–0	1–1	0–1	0–1	1–4	0–4
Petro de Luanda	2–0	0–0	4–1	1–0	3–1	2–1	1–2	5–1	—	3–1	1–0	4–2	1–1	2–1
Petro do Huambo	2–0	1–0	2–0	2–0	0–0	0–0	0–1	4–0	0–1	—	1–0	2–1	2–1	2–0
Primeiro de Agosto	1–0	1–1	1–0	2–0	1–0	2–0	0–0	3–1	3–4	1–2	—	0–0	2–0	4–1
Primeiro de Maio	1–1	1–1	1–0	1–0	3–1	2–0	1–2	2–0	1–0	1–1	0–2	—	0–0	1–0
Sagrada Esperança	1–0	2–3	6–1	1–0	1–1	1–3	1–2	3–0	1–0	1–0	1–1	1–0	—	2–1
Santos FC	2–1	0–1	2–1	0–1	0–0	2–1	0–1	2–1	2–0	0–0	0–3	1–0	1–2	—

Updated to match(es) played on 6 November 2007. Source: girabola.com
Legend: Blue = home team win; Yellow = draw; Red = away team win.

== Season statistics ==
=== Top scorers ===
Rank	Scorer	Club	Goals
1	(Angola) Manucho Gonçalves	Petro de Luanda	15
2	(Angola) Pedro Henriques	Interclube	11
3	(Angola) Rasca	ASA	9*
4	(Namibia) Levis	Primeiro de Agosto	6*

* As of September 2nd

=== Hat-tricks ===
Player	For	Against	Result	Date
Manucho	Petro de Luanda	Primeiro de Maio	4-2	18 February 2007
Bebeto	Sagrada Esperança	Juventude Moxico	3-0	18 February 2007

2007 Girabola winner

1st title

Squad: Bebé, Bumba, Carlos, Eduardo, Igor, Ito, Joel, Kanu, Kikas, Kito, Lucas,
Man Baia, Mário, Mingo, Minguito, Nunas, Nuno, Nzinga, P.Henriques, Roger, Romi, Tsherry, Wetshi, Yano, Yuri
Head coach: Carlos Mozer
