= Carlos Alves =

Carlos Alves may refer to:

- Carlos Zingaro (born 1948), Portuguese violinist
- Carlos Santana (Carlos Augusto Alves Santana, born 1947), American musician
- Carlos Alberto Alves Garcia (born 1982), Portuguese footballer playing in Switzerland
- Carlos Alves Júnior (1903–1978), Portuguese international footballer
- Carlos Alves, Angolan football striker in the 80s, for Primeiro de Agosto
- Carlos Alves (footballer, born 1988), Portuguese professional footballer
