= 2020–21 Girabola =

Girabola
- Season: 2020–21
- Champions: Sagrada Esperança
- Matches played: 240
- Goals scored: 501 (2.09 per match)
- Top goalscorer: (Brazil) Azulão (16 goals)

The 2020–21 Girabola was the 43rd season of top-tier football in Angola. The season was held from 26 December 2020 until 29 June 2021.

The league comprised 16 teams and the bottom three teams were relegated to the 2021–22 Provincial stages.

Sagrada Esperança won the title while Baixa de Cassanje, Santa Rita de Cássia and Ferroviário do Huambo were relegated.

== Managerial changes ==
| Team | Outgoing manager | Manner of departure | # Matches | Period | Inc Pos | Out Pos | Incoming manager | Date of appointment | Final Pos |
|---|---|---|---|---|---|---|---|---|---|
| Baixa de Cassanje | (Angola) Manuel Martins | Sacked | 7/30 | 26/12/2020 – 3/2/2021 | n/a | 15th | (Angola) Paulo Saraiva | 4 February 2021 | 14th |
| Petro de Luanda | (Spain) Tony Cosano | Sacked | 11/30 | 26/12/2020 – 24/2/2021 | n/a | 3rd | (Angola) Bodunha | 25 February 2021 | 2nd |
| Desportivo da Huíla | (Angola) André Macanga | Resigned | 10/30 | 26/12/2020 – 24/2/2021 | n/a | 10th | (Angola) Mário Soares | 2 March 2021 | 11th |
| Cuando Cubango FC | (Angola) Albano César | Sacked | 13/30 | 26/12/2020 – 8/3/2021 | n/a | 10th | (Angola) Hélder Teixeira | 3 March 2021 | 12th |
| Wiliete S.C. | (Angola) João Pintar | Sacked | 6/30 | 26/12/2020 – 1/2/2021 | n/a | 14th | (Angola) Albano César | 2 April 2021 | 7th |
| Recreativo do Libolo | (Angola) Romeu Filemón | Sacked | 15/30 | 26/12/2020 – 3/4/2021 | n/a | 12th | (Portugal) Paulo Torres | 4 April 2021 | 10th |
| Cuando Cubango FC | (Angola) Hélder Teixeira | Sacked | 10/17 | 8/3/2021 – 25/6/2021 | 10th | 10th | (Angola) Luís Quintas | 25 June 2021 | 12th |
| 1º de Agosto | (Portugal) Paulo Duarte | Sacked | 25/30 | 23/12/2020 – 29/6/2021 | n/a | 3rd | (Angola) Filipe Nzanza | 29 June 2021 | 3rd |
| Recreativo da Caála | (Angola) David Dias | Deceased | 25/30 | 27/12/2020 – 20/6/2021 | n/a | 6th | (Angola) Dudú Leite/Silvano Cussanda | 23 June 2021 | 6th |

== League table ==
| Pos | Team | Pld | W | D | L | GF | GA | GD | Pts | Qualification or relegation |
|---|---|---|---|---|---|---|---|---|---|---|
| 1 | Sagrada Esperança (C) | 30 | 21 | 7 | 2 | 42 | 10 | +32 | 70 | Qualification for Champions League |
| 2 | Petro de Luanda (Q) | 30 | 21 | 4 | 5 | 47 | 17 | +30 | 67 | Qualification for Champions League |
| 3 | Primeiro de Agosto (Q) | 30 | 19 | 7 | 4 | 54 | 23 | +31 | 64 | Qualification for Confederation Cup |
| 4 | Bravos do Maquis (Note: Bravos do Maquis was awarded 6 points and 3–0 wins against Santa Rita and Desportivo da Huíla in the 11th and 6th round matches, respectively.) | 30 | 15 | 10 | 5 | 43 | 23 | +20 | 55 | |
| 5 | Interclube (Note: Santa Rita was awarded a 3–0 win against Interclube as Interclube failed to produce valid licences in their away match against Santa Rita.) | 30 | 11 | 11 | 8 | 35 | 22 | +13 | 44 | |
| 6 | Recreativo da Caála | 30 | 11 | 13 | 6 | 30 | 19 | +11 | 46 | |
| 7 | Wiliete SC | 30 | 10 | 11 | 9 | 38 | 33 | +5 | 41 | |
| 8 | Académica do Lobito (Note: Académica do Lobito was awarded a 3–0 win against Sporting de Cabinda as Sporting were absent from the match citing lack of transportation.) | 30 | 10 | 8 | 12 | 30 | 31 | −1 | 38 | |
| 9 | Progresso do Sambizanga | 30 | 9 | 7 | 14 | 29 | 37 | −8 | 34 | |
| 10 | Recreativo do Libolo | 30 | 8 | 10 | 12 | 21 | 32 | −11 | 34 | |
| 11 | Desportivo da Huíla | 30 | 9 | 7 | 14 | 25 | 30 | −5 | 34 | |
| 12 | Cuando Cubango FC | 30 | 6 | 15 | 9 | 31 | 31 | 0 | 33 (Note: Head-to-head results: C.Cubango 5, Sporting 0; Sporting 2 C.Cubango 0.) | |
| 13 | Sporting de Cabinda | 30 | 10 | 3 | 17 | 25 | 40 | −15 | 33 | |
| 14 | Baixa de Cassanje (R) | 30 | 8 | 8 | 14 | 28 | 43 | −15 | 32 | Relegation to Provincial stages |
| 15 | Santa Rita de Cássia (R) | 30 | 7 | 8 | 15 | 18 | 29 | −11 | 29 | Relegation to Provincial stages |
| 16 | Ferroviário do Huambo (Note: Ferroviário do Huambo forfeited all points (up until the 27th round) for fielding an ineligible player. Subsequently, the respective opponents were awarded a 3-0 win.) (R) | 30 | 0 | 1 | 29 | 5 | 81 | −76 | 1 | Relegation to Provincial stages |

Updated to match(es) played on 31 July 2021. Source: Girabola.com Girabola, SOCCERWAY
Rules for classification: 1) Points; 2) Head-to-head points; 3) Goal difference; 4) Head-to-head goal difference; 5) Goals scored; 6) Fair-play points; 7) Play-off.
(C) Champions; (Q) Qualified to the phase indicated; (R) Relegated

== Results ==
| Home \ Away | ACA | BAI | BMQ | CCU | DHL | FHU | INT | PET | PRI | PRO | RCA | RLB | SAG | SCC | SRC | WIL |
|---|---|---|---|---|---|---|---|---|---|---|---|---|---|---|---|---|
| Académica do Lobito | — | 2–1 | 1–1 | 0–2 | 0–1 | 0–0 | 1–1 | 0–1 | 3–1 | 2–1 | 0–0 | 0–0 | 1–1 | 3–0 (Note: Académica was awarded a 3–0 win) | 1–0 | 3–0 |
| Baixa de Cassanje | 0–1 | — | 3–3 | 2–1 | 0–0 | 3–0 (Note: Baixa was awarded a 3–0 win (original score 2–1 win)) | 1–0 | 1–2 | 0–2 | 0–0 | 0–0 | 1–1 | 1–3 | 0–0 | 2–0 | 1–1 |
| Bravos do Maquis | 1–0 | 0–1 | — | 3–1 | 3–0 | 3–0 (Note: Maquis was awarded a 3–0 win (original score 0–0)) | 0–0 | 1–1 | 3–2 | 3–0 | 2–0 | 1–0 | 0–1 | 1–0 | 3–0 (Note: Maquis was awarded a 3–0 win) | 2–1 |
| Cuando Cubango FC | 1–1 | 1–1 | 0–1 | — | 2–2 | 3–0 (Note: Cuando Cubango was awarded a 3–0 win (original score 1–1)) | 0–0 | 0–2 | 0–2 | 1–1 | 0–0 | 3–0 (Note: Cuando Cubango was awarded a 3–0 win) | 0–0 | 5–0 | 0–0 | 0–0 |
| Desportivo da Huíla | 2–0 | 0–1 | 1–1 | 3–0 | — | 3–0 (Note: Desportivo was awarded a 3–0 win (original score 2–2)) | 2–0 | 0–1 | 0–0 | 0–1 | 0–0 | 1–2 | 0–1 | 1–0 | 1–0 | 1–0 |
| Ferroviário do Huambo | 0–3 (Note: Académica was awarded a 0–3 win (original score 1–0 defeat)) | 0–3 (Note: Baixa was awarded a 0–3 win (original score 1–0 defeat)) | 0–3 (Note: Maquis was awarded a 0–3 win (original score 2–0 defeat)) | 0–3 (Note: Cuando Cubango was awarded a 0–3 win (original score 1–1)) | 2–3 | — | 0–2 | 0–2 | 0–3 (Note: D'Agosto was awarded a 0–3 win (original score 1–2 win)) | 0–3 (Note: Progresso was awarded a 0–3 win (original score 0–0)) | 1–2 | 0–3 (Note: Libolo was awarded a 0–3 win (original score 1–0 defeat)) | 0–3 (Note: Sagrada was awarded a 0–3 win (original score 1–0 defeat)) | 1–2 | 0–3 (Note: Santa Rita was awarded a 0–3 win (original score 1–0 defeat)) | 0–3 (Note: Wiliete was awarded a 0–3 win (original score 2–0 defeat)) |
| Interclube | 2–0 | 1–0 | 3–1 | 1–1 | 3–0 | 5–0 | — | 0–1 | 0–1 | 1–0 | 2–1 | 0–0 | 0–1 | 4–1 | 0–0 | 1–0 |
| Petro de Luanda | 1–0 | 5–1 | 3–1 | 0–0 | 2–1 | 3–0 | 1–0 | — | 3–0 | 3–1 | 0–0 | 1–1 | 0–1 | 1–0 | 1–0 | 2–0 |
| Primeiro de Agosto | 2–0 | 3–0 | 0–0 | 2–0 | 2–0 | 4–1 | 1–0 | 1–0 | — | 2–1 | 4–0 | 1–1 | 1–1 | 2–1 | 4–2 | 2–2 |
| Progresso do Sambizanga | 0–0 | 4–2 | 2–0 | 0–0 | 2–1 | 3–0 (Note: Progresso was awarded a 3–0 win (original score 2–2)) | 1–1 | 2–3 | 0–1 | — | 0–3 | 2–1 | 0–1 | 3–0 | 1–0 | 0–0 |
| Recreativo da Caála | 1–0 | 4–0 | 1–1 | 1–1 | 0–0 | 3–0 (Note: Caála was awarded a 3–0 win (original score 2–0 win)) | 2–2 | 0–1 | 1–2 | 3–0 | — | 0–1 | 1–0 | 1–0 | 1–0 | 2–0 |
| Recreativo do Libolo | 1–2 | 1–2 | 0–0 | 0–2 | 2–1 | 1–0 | 0–0 | 0–3 | 2–2 | 1–0 | 0–0 | — | 1–4 | 1–0 | 0–0 | 1–0 |
| Sagrada Esperança | 2–1 | 3–0 | 0–0 | 3–0 | 2–0 | 1–0 | 2–2 | 1–0 | 2–1 | 2–0 | 1–1 | 2–0 | — | 1–0 | 2–0 | 1–0 |
| Sporting de Cabinda | 0–2 | 2–1 | 0–2 | 2–0 | 0–0 | 4–0 | 1–0 | 3–0 | 0–4 | 3–0 (Note: Sporting was awarded a 3–0 win) | 1–1 | 1–0 | 1–0 | — | 1–0 | 2–3 |
| Santa Rita de Cássia | 1–0 | 2–0 | 0–1 | 2–2 | 1–0 | 1–0 | 1–2 | 2–1 | 0–2 | 1–1 | 0–0 | 0–1 | 0–1 | 1–0 | — | 1–1 |
| Wiliete SC | 6–3 | 1–0 | 2–2 | 2–2 | 2–1 | 3–0 (Note: Wiliete was awarded a 3–0 win (original score 0–0)) | 2–2 | 0–3 | 1–1 | 0–2 | 1–0 | 2–0 | 0–0 | 2–0 | 0–0 | — |

Updated to match(es) played on 31 July 2021. Source: girabola.com
Legend: Blue = home team win; Yellow = draw; Red = away team win.

== Season statistics ==
=== Scorers ===
R/T
| R/T | ACA | BAI | BMQ | CCU | DHL | FHU | INT | PET | PRI | PRO | RCA | RLB | SAG | SCC | SRC | WIL | TOTAL |
|---|---|---|---|---|---|---|---|---|---|---|---|---|---|---|---|---|---|
| 1 | 26/12/21 | 27/12/21 | 28/12/21 | 27/12/21 | 27/3/21 | 27/12/21 | 29/12/21 | 28/12/21 | 29/12/21 | 21/3/21 | 27/12/21 | 21/3/21 | 26/12/21 | 27/3/21 | 27/12/21 | 27/12/21 | 16 |
| 1 | ACA–SAG 1–1; Adó Pena 69' | | PET–BMQ 3–1; Benarfa 70' | | | | | PET–BMQ 3–1; Picas 45' 57'; Tony 83' | PRI–INT 1–0; Moya 57' | PRO–RLB 2–1; Chiló 17'; Julinho 85' | RCA–BAI 4–0; Depú 38' 83'; Moco 51' | PRO–RLB 2–1; Ning 70' | ACA–SAG 1–1; P.Henrique 22' | | SRC–WIL 1–1; M.C. 27' | SRC–WIL 1–1; Messinho 90+2' | 16 |
| 2 | 2/1/21 | 2/1/21 | 2/1/21 | 20/3/21 | 3/1/21 | 3/1/21 | 3/1/21 | 2/1/21 | 20/3/21 | 2/1/21 | 3/1/21 | 2/1/21 | 31/3/21 | 31/3/21 | 3/1/21 | 3/1/21 | 8 |
| 2 | | | BMQ–ACA 1–0; Wiwí 47' | | | | INT–WIL 1–0; Mano Calesso 90' | RLB–PET 0–3; Yano 27'; Azulão 54'; Job 71' | CCU–PRI 0–2; Melono 22'; Mabululu 69' | | | | SAG–SCC 1–0; Jó Paciência 28' pen. | | | | 8 |
| 3 | 9/1/21 | 12/1/21 | 9/1/21 | 10/1/21 | 10/1/21 | 10/1/21 | 10/1/21 | 12/1/21 | 18/4/21 | 9/1/21 | 10/1/21 | 9/1/21 | 10/1/21 | 9/1/21 | 9/1/21 | 18/4/21 | 21 |
| 3 | | PET–BAI 5–1; Magrinho 76' | SCC–BMQ 0–2; Makusa 1'; Chole 45+1' | CCU–DHL 2–2; Ndieu 81'; Coxe 86' | CCU–DHL 2–2; Tchutchu 2'; Nuno 36' | | RCA–INT 2–2; Mano Calesso 8'; Dasfaa 76' | PET–BAI 5–1; Dany 12'; Geúda 54' o.g. Picas 55' 84'; Megue 88' | PRI–WIL 2–2; Zini 40' 60' | PRO–SRC 1–0; Vanilson 87' | RCA–INT 2–2; Depú 27'; Jó Simões 69' | | | | | PRI–WIL 2–2; Bugos 8'; Jó Vidal 18' o.g. | 21 |
| 4 | 16/1/21 | 16/1/21 | 16/1/21 | 16/1/21 | 17/3/21 | 16/1/21 | 15/1/21 | 17/1/21 | 17/3/21 | 15/1/21 | 17/1/21 | 27/1/21 | 16/1/21 | 27/1/21 | 17/1/21 | 17/1/21 | 10 |
| 4 | BAI–ACA 0–1; Jiresse 19' | | | | | | INT–PRO 1–0; Paty ' | SRC–PET 2–1; Job 4' pen. | | | | RLB–SCC 1–0; Francis 20' | SAG–CCU 3–0; Lima 23' pen. Jó Paciência 67'; Matengó 80' | | SRC–PET 2–1; Gui 20' 53' | WIL–RCA 1–0; Nzau 64' | 10 |
| 5 | 20/1/21 | 20/3/21 | 24/2/21 | 24/2/21 | 24/2/21 | 20/1/21 | 20/1/21 | 20/1/21 | 13/4/21 | 20/1/21 | 13/4/21 | 20/1/21 | 24/2/21 | 20/3/21 | 20/1/21 | 20/1/21 | 11 |
| 5 | ACA–SRC 1–0; Adó Pena 53' | SCC–BAI 2–1; Rupson 9' | CCU–BMQ 0–1; Chole 90+2' | | | | | PET–INT 1–0; Manguxi 64' | PRI–RCA 4–0; Bobo 21'; Bito 31' 90+1'; Zini 45+2' | | | | DHL–SAG 0–1; Seth 15' o.g. | SCC–BAI 2–1; Castro 39' pen. Gláucio 61' | | | 11 |
| 6 | 24/1/21 | 23/1/21 | 20/3/21 | 24/1/21 | 20/3/21 | 23/1/21 | 24/1/21 | 24/1/21 | 6/4/21 | 24/1/21 | 24/1/21 | 24/1/21 | 6/4/21 | 23/1/21 | 23/1/21 | 24/1/21 | 14 |
| 6 | | | | RLB–CCU 0–2; Apado 20'; Gaca 80' | | | INT–ACA 2–0; Dasfaa 51' pen. Wilfried 72' | WIL–PET 0–3; Yano 14' 57'; Mensah 24' | SAG–PRI 2–1; Aldair 69' | | RCA–PRO 3–0; Moco 47' 86'; Jó Simões 68' | | SAG–PRI 2–1; Jó Paciência 29' 57' | | SRC–SCC 1–0; Mafuta 73' | | 14 |
| 7 | 30/1/21 | 31/1/21 | 17/3/21 | 31/1/21 | 31/1/21 | 31/1/21 | 30/1/21 | 30/1/21 | 10/4/21 | 10/4/21 | 30/1/21 | 31/1/21 | 17/3/21 | 30/1/21 | 31/1/21 | 30/1/21 | 12 |
| 7 | ACA–WIL 3–0; Cláudio 49' 57'; Márcio 87' | CCU–BAI 1–1; Man Pé 86' | | CCU–BAI 1–1; Mussa 5' | DHL–RLB 1–2; Pedro Kassadi 29' | | | | PRI–PRO 2–1; Jó Vidal 15'; Mário Balbúrdia 27' | PRI–PRO 2–1; Julinho 73' | | DHL–RLB 1–2; Francis 79'; Pino 89' | | SCC–INT 1–0; Gláucio 4' | | | 12 |
| 8 | 3/2/21 | 3/2/21 | 10/2/21 | 3/2/21 | 3/2/21 | 3/2/21 | 3/2/21 | 3/2/21 | 10/2/21 | 3/2/21 | 3/2/21 | 3/2/21 | 3/2/21 | 3/2/21 | 3/2/21 | 3/2/21 | 27 |
| 8 | | | BMQ–PRI 3–2; Da Banda 10'; Benarfa 44' 80' | SRC–CCU 2–2; Ndieu 9'; Mussa 77' | | | INT–FHU 5–0; Gazeta 1' 14' 45'; Dasfaa 12'; Mano Calesso 16' | PRO–PET 2–3; Azulão 16'; Job 36'; Picas 50' | BMQ–PRI 3–2; Mário Balbúrdia 16'; Mabululu 90+2' | PRO–PET 2–3; Julinho 15'; Filhão 28' | RCA–ACA 1–0; Jó Simões 31' | RLB–SAG 1–4; Popó 67' | RLB–SAG 1–4; Luís Tati 56' 62'; Cachi 45+1'; Jó Paciência 89' | | SRC–CCU 2–2; Russinho 32'; Kodak 90+3' | WIL–SCC 2–0; Dieu 32'; Quinho 47' | 27 |
| 9 | 6/2/21 | 7/2/21 | 6/2/21 | 7/2/21 | 7/2/21 | 7/2/21 | 7/2/21 | 7/2/21 | 7/2/21 | 6/2/21 | 6/2/21 | 6/2/21 | 7/2/21 | 6/2/21 | 7/2/21 | 7/2/21 | 11 |
| 9 | ACA–PRO 2–1; Adó Pena 19' 23' | | BMQ–RLB 1–0; Da Banda 50' | | DHL–SRC 1–0; Sidney 34' pen. | | | | PRI–PET 1–0; Matuwila 86' o.g. | ACA–PRO 2–1; Kibeixa 54' pen. | SCC–RCA 1–1; Malamba 67' | | SAG–BAI 3–0; Simão 1'; Gaspar 22'; Celso 54' | SCC–RCA 1–1; Gláucio 43' | | | 11 |
| 10 | 14/4/21 | 13/2/21 | 13/2/21 | 14/2/21 | 13/2/21 | 14/2/21 | 13/2/21 | 14/4/21 | 3/4/21 | 13/2/21 | 14/2/21 | 3/4/21 | 14/2/21 | 13/2/21 | 14/2/21 | 14/2/21 | 22 |
| 10 | | BAI–BMQ 3–3; Rupson 13'; Magrinho 43'; Maludi 66' | BAI–BMQ 3–3; Lara 28'; Benarfa 36'; Da Banda 48' | WIL–CCU 2–2; Celi 25' 46' | | | INT–DHL 3–0; Dasfaa 10' 16'; Wilfried 71' | PET–ACA 1–0; Mensah 46' | RLB–PRI 2–2; Mabululu 5'; Melono 15' | PRO–SCC 3–0; Filhão 35' 72'; Chiló 66' | | RLB–PRI 2–2; Ning 46' 74' | SRC–SAG 0–1; Celso 1' | | | WIL–CCU 2–2; Caporal 55' 86' pen. | 22 |
| 11 | 17/2/21 | 17/2/21 | 17/2/21 | 17/2/21 | 17/2/21 | 17/2/21 | 17/2/21 | 17/2/21 | 17/2/21 | 17/2/21 | 17/2/21 | 17/2/21 | 17/2/21 | 17/2/21 | 17/2/21 | 17/2/21 | 13 |
| 11 | | RLB–BAI 1–2; Rupson 7'; Mavambu 60' | | | DHL–WIL 1–0; Emmanuel 90+2' | | SAG–INT 2–2; Dasfaa 19' pen. Nandinho 80' | | PRI–ACA 2–0; Líbero 78'o.g. Buá 90+4' | | | RLB–BAI 1–2; Ning 73' | SAG–INT 2–2; Matengó 73' pen. 78' | SCC–PET 3–0; Yele 11'; Castro 26'; Lazi 35' | | | 13 |
| 12 | 20/2/21 | 31/3/21 | 20/2/21 | 20/2/21 | 21/2/21 | 20/2/21 | 20/2/21 | 20/2/21 | 31/3/21 | 20/2/21 | 21/2/21 | 21/2/21 | 21/2/21 | 20/2/21 | 21/2/21 | 21/2/21 | 10 |
| 12 | | | INT–BMQ 3–1; Sidnei 15' | | | | INT–BMQ 3–1; Wilfried 39'; Leonel 45+1'; Jaredi 81' | PET–FHU 3–0; Azulão 20' 77' pen. Yano 86' | BAI–PRI 0–2; Mabululu 28' 49' | | | SRC–RLB 0–1; Dilson 19' | | | | | 10 |
| 13 | 28/2/21 | 27/2/21 | 28/2/21 | 28/2/21 | 28/2/21 | 28/2/21 | 27/2/21 | 28/2/21 | 28/2/21 | 28/2/21 | 28/2/21 | 27/2/21 | 28/2/21 | 28/2/21 | 27/2/21 | 28/2/21 | 13 |
| 13 | | BAI–SRC 2–0; Mavambu 15' 22' pen. | BMQ–WIL 2–1; Zico 40'; Benarfa 90+1' | | | | | CCU–PET 0–2; Azulão 9' 44' | PRI–SCC 2–1; Mabululu 38' 52' | DHL–PRO 0–1; Dax 42' | SAG–RCA 1–1; Depú 45+2' | | SAG–RCA 1–1; Celso 61' | PRI–SCC 2–1; Lazi 83' | | BMQ–WIL 2–1; Quinho 48' | 13 |
| 14 | 6/3/21 | 6/3/21 | 7/3/21 | 6/3/21 | 31/3/21 | 6/3/21 | 6/3/21 | 31/3/21 | 7/3/21 | 6/3/21 | 7/3/21 | 7/3/21 | 6/3/21 | 6/3/21 | 7/3/21 | 7/3/21 | 17 |
| 14 | | | RCA–BMQ 1–1; Zico 48' | ACA–CCU 0–2; Paulito 61'; Cuca 90+2' | PET–DHL 2–1; Emmanuel 90+1' | | INT–BAI 1–0; Dasfaa 90' | PET–DHL 2–1; Job 4'; Picas 46' | SRC–PRI 0–2; Cirilo 75'; Macaia 85' | | RCA–BMQ 1–1; Depú 25' | | PRO–SAG 0–1; Chico Bunga 41' | SCC–FHU 4–0; Yele 44' 63'; Gláucio 15'; Lazi 44' | | WIL–RLB 2–0; Caporal 1'; Quinho 90' | 17 |
| 15 | 14/3/21 | 13/3/21 | 13/3/21 | 14/3/21 | 14/3/21 | 14/3/21 | 14/3/21 | 23/4/21 | 14/3/21 | 13/3/21 | 13/3/21 | 13/3/21 | 23/4/21 | 14/3/21 | 14/3/21 | 13/3/21 | 16 |
| 15 | | BAI–WIL 1–1; Hamilton 44' | BMQ–PRO 3–0; Tobias 28'; Zico 68'; Benarfa 86' | CCU–SCC 5–0; Paulito 10'; Betinho 27'; Coxe 29' 47'; Wuta 65' | DHL–ACA 2–0; Sidney 73'; Nuno 90+3' | | SRC–INT 1–2; Wilfried 78'; Dasfaa 82' pen. | | | | | | SAG–PET 1–0; Lépua 64' | | SRC–INT 1–2; Russinho 72' | BAI–WIL 1–1; Caporal 13' | 16 |
| 16 | 27/4/21 | 24/4/21 | 27/4/21 | 25/4/21 | 6/5/21 | 25/4/21 | 24/4/21 | 27/4/21 | 24/4/21 | 24/4/21 | 24/4/21 | 24/4/21 | 27/4/21 | 6/5/21 | 25/4/21 | 25/4/21 | 8 |
| 16 | SAG–ACA 2–1; Jiresse 69' | | BMQ–PET 1–1; Da Banda 19' | | DHL–SCC 1–0; Bruno 54' pen. | | | BMQ–PET 1–1; Azulão 72' | INT–PRI 0–1; Moya 52' | | | RLB–PRO 1–0; Caneta 6' | SAG–ACA 2–1; Cachi 2'; Jó Paciência 63' | | | | 8 |
| 17 | 1/5/21 | 1/5/21 | 1/5/21 | 2/5/21 | 1/5/21 | 1/5/21 | 2/5/21 | 1/5/21 | 2/5/21 | 1/5/21 | 2/5/21 | 1/5/21 | 1/5/21 | 1/5/21 | 2/5/21 | 2/5/21 | 23 |
| 17 | ACA–BMQ 1–1; Lima 89' | PRO–BAI 4–2; Cebola 49'; Rupson 70' | ACA–BMQ 1–1; Aguinaldo 36' | | FHU–DHL 2–3; Álvaro 5' o.g. Bruno 51' pen. Emmanuel 83' | FHU–DHL 2–3; Vingumba 5'; Aníbal 48' | WIL–INT 2–2; Wilfried 11'; Brazuca 87' o.g. | PET–RLB 1–1; Picas 48' | PRI–CCU 2–0; Paizo 42'; Bobo 67' | PRO–BAI 4–2; Vanilson 7' 69'; Kibeixa 24' pen. 63' pen. | RCA–SRC 1–0; Deco 79' | PET–RLB 1–1; Fofó 42' pen. | | SCC–SAG 1–0; Gláucio 19' | | WIL–INT 2–2; Maria Pia 26' 29' | 23 |
| 18 | 8/5/21 | 8/5/21 | 8/5/21 | 9/5/21 | 9/5/21 | 8/5/21 | 8/5/21 | 8/5/21 | 9/5/21 | 9/5/21 | 8/5/21 | 8/5/21 | 8/5/21 | 8/5/21 | 9/5/21 | 9/5/21 | 18 |
| 18 | RLB–ACA 1–2; Makusa 36'; Bebo 85' o.g. | BAI–PET 1–2; Maludi 25' | BMQ–SCC 1–0; Benarfa 14' | | DHL–CCU 3–0; Nandinho 25'; Emmanuel 41'; Milton 68' | | INT–RCA 2–1; Wilfried 49'; Julinho 80' | BAI–PET 1–2; Megue 33'; Figueira 90+4' | WIL–PRI 1–1; Bito 67' | SRC–PRO 1–1; Julinho 73' | INT–RCA 2–1; Deco 1' | RLB–ACA 1–2; Vally 72' | SAG–FHU 1–0; Cachi 21' | | SRC–PRO 1–1; Daniel 4' | WIL–PRI 1–1; Zeca 59' | 18 |
| 19 | 12/5/21 | 12/5/21 | 12/5/21 | 9/6/21 | 12/5/21 | 12/5/21 | 12/5/21 | 12/5/21 | 12/5/21 | 12/5/21 | 12/5/21 | 12/5/21 | 9/6/21 | 12/5/21 | 12/5/21 | 12/5/21 | 11 |
| 19 | ACA–BAI 2–1; Makusa 25'; Jiresse 59' | ACA–BAI 2–1; Rupson 50' | | | | | PRO–INT 1–1; Mano Calesso 73' | PET–SRC 1–0; Azulão 81' | PRI–DHL 2–0; Melono 67'; Mabululu 74' | PRO–INT 1–1; Julinho 68' | RCA–WIL 2–0; Deco 41' 75' | | | SCC–RLB 1–0; Kadima 69' | | | 11 |
| 20 | 16/6/21 | 24/6/21 | 3/7/21 | 3/7/21 | 15/5/21 | 15/5/21 | 16/5/21 | 16/5/21 | 16/5/21 | 16/5/21 | 16/5/21 | 15/5/21 | 15/5/21 | 24/6/21 | 16/6/21 | 16/5/21 | 14 |
| 20 | | | BMQ–CCU 3–1; Benarfa 25'; Lomalisa 31'; Da Banda 85' | BMQ–CCU 3–1; Lito 40' | | | | INT–PET 0–1; Azulão 1' | RCA–PRI 1–2; Zini 20' 90' | | RCA–PRI 1–2; Depú 76' | RLB–FHU 1–0; Ning 61' | SAG–DHL 2–0; Jó Paciência 42'; Luís Tati 69' | | SRC–ACA 1–0; Crespo 27' | WIL–PRO 2–0; Zeca 60'; João Vala 90+3' | 14 |
| 21 | 3/7/21 | 23/5/21 | 23/5/21 | 6/7/21 | 23/5/21 | 23/5/21 | 3/7/21 | 22/5/21 | 23/5/21 | 24/5/21 | 24/5/21 | 6/7/21 | 23/5/21 | 22/5/21 | 22/5/21 | 22/5/21 | 10 |
| 21 | ACA–INT 1–1; Ady Boyó 58' | | DHL–BMQ 1–1; Aguinaldo 49' | | DHL–BMQ 1–1; Fred 69' | | ACA–INT 1–1; Kaya 34' | PET–WIL 2–0; Azulão 53'; Tony 56' | | | PRO–RCA 0–3; Depú 15'; Jó Simões 47'; Pedro Djuma 88' | | | SCC–SRC 1–0; Castro 46' | | | 10 |
| 22 | 30/5/21 | 1/6/21 | 29/5/21 | 1/6/21 | 29/5/21 | 30/5/21 | 29/5/21 | 30/5/21 | 29/5/21 | 29/5/21 | 30/5/21 | 29/5/21 | 29/5/21 | 29/5/21 | 30/5/21 | 30/5/21 | 25 |
| 22 | WIL–ACA 7–3; Adó Pena 19'; Makusa 46'; Gaio Tomás 90+3' | BAI–CCU 2–1; Magrinho 21' 27' | | BAI–CCU 2–1; Coxe 6' | RLB–DHL 2–1; Gogoró 55' | | INT–SCC 4–1; Higino 34'; Dasfaa 36' 65'; Wilfried | RCA–PET 0–1; Job 45+3' | PRO–PRI 0–1; Mabululu 27' | | | RLB–DHL 2–1; Vally 61'; Liliano 88' | BMQ–SAG 0–1; Celso 75' | INT–SCC 4–1; Gláucio 20' | SRC–FHU 1–0; Crespo 65' | WIL–ACA 7–3; Caporal 3' 24' 58'; João Vala 12' 87'; Zeca 82'; Odilon 90' | 25 |
| 23 | 5/6/21 | 6/6/21 | 5/6/21 | 6/6/21 | 6/6/21 | 6/6/21 | 6/6/21 | 6/6/21 | 5/6/21 | 6/6/21 | 5/6/21 | 10/7/21 | 10/7/21 | 5/6/21 | 6/6/21 | 5/6/21 | 14 |
| 23 | | DHL–BAI 0–1; Chimba 62' | | | | | FHU–INT 0–2; Wilfried 33'; Quinito 36' | PET–PRO 3–1; Azulão 10' 28' 71' | | PET–PRO 3–1; Julinho 84' | | | SAG–RLB 2–0; Caranga 17'; Luís Tati 64' | SCC–WILL 2–3; Castro 31'; Gláucio 57' | | SCC–WILL 2–3; João Vala 14'; Ndié 44'; Yele 87' | 14 |
| 24 | 12/6/21 | 12/6/21 | 13/7/21 | 12/6/21 | 13/6/21 | 13/6/21 | 12/6/21 | 12/6/21 | 12/6/21 | 12/6/21 | 12/6/21 | 13/7/21 | 12/6/21 | 12/6/21 | 13/6/21 | 13/6/21 | 11 |
| 24 | | BAI–SAG 1–3; Rupson 39' | | INT–CCU 1–1; Messias 42' | | | INT–CCU 1–1; Paty 2' | PET–PRI 3–0; Job 1'; Azulão 44'; Vidinho 49' | | | RCA–SCC 1–0; Careca 88' | | BAI–SAG 1–3; Caranga 6'; Matengó ' Simão ' | | SRC–DHL 1–0; Shoma 90+4' | | 11 |
| 25 | 20/6/21 | 19/6/21 | 19/6/21 | 20/6/21 | 20/6/21 | 20/6/21 | 20/6/21 | 20/6/21 | 16/7/21 | 20/6/21 | 20/6/21 | 16/7/21 | 19/6/21 | 20/6/21 | 19/6/21 | 20/6/21 | 11 |
| 25 | | BMQ–BAI 0–1; Rupson 82' | | | DHL–INT 2–0; Emmanuel 41'; Mendes 45' | FHU–RCA 1–2; Benvindo 4' | | ACA–PET 0–1; Megue 55' | PRI–RLB 1–1; Zini 71' | | FHU–RCA 1–2; Deco 9'; Nilton 55' | PRI–RLB 1–1; Lukeba 50' | SAG–SRC 2–0; Chico Bunga 30'; Luís Tati 44' | | | | 11 |
| 26 | 26/6/21 | 27/6/21 | 7/7/21 | 27/6/21 | 27/6/21 | 26/6/21 | 26/6/21 | 27/6/21 | 26/6/21 | 26/6/21 | 27/6/21 | 27/6/21 | 26/6/21 | 27/6/21 | 7/7/21 | 27/6/21 | 14 |
| 26 | ACA–PRI 3–1; Ady Boyó 6'; Mano Mano 19'; Makusa 90+4' | BAI–RLB 1–1; Rupson 63' | SRC–BMQ 0–1; Wiwí 18' | RCA–CCU 1–1; Coxe 90+1' | WIL–DHL 2–1; Emmanuel 44' | | | PET–SCC 1–0; Megue 22' | ACA–PRI 3–1; Bobo 90+3' | | RCA–CCU 1–1; Nilton 14' | BAI–RLB 1–1; Liliano 59' | INT–SAG 0–1; Cachi 90' | | | WIL–DHL 2–1; João Vala 36'; Zeca 72' | 14 |
| 27 | 30/6/21 | 30/6/21 | 30/6/21 | 30/6/21 | 30/6/21 | 30/6/21 | 30/6/21 | 30/6/21 | 30/6/21 | 30/6/21 | 30/6/21 | 30/6/21 | 30/6/21 | 30/6/21 | 30/6/21 | 30/6/21 | 10 |
| 27 | SCC–ACA 0–2; Ady Boyó 64'; Vladimir 90' | | | CCU–PRO 1–1; Cuca 46' | | | | FHU–PET 0–2; Azulão 24'; Job 82' | PRI–BAI 3–0; Moya 33' pen. 52'; Mário Balbúrdia 44' | CCU–PRO 1–1; Kibeixa 88' pen. | | | SAG–WIL 1–0; Lépua 59' | | | | 10 |
| 28 | 17/7/21 | 18/7/21 | 18/7/21 | 19/7/21 | 17/7/21 | 17/7/21 | 19/7/21 | 19/7/21 | 19/7/21 | 17/7/21 | 19/7/21 | 19/7/21 | 19/7/21 | 19/7/21 | 18/7/21 | 18/7/21 | 14 |
| 28 | | | WIL–BMQ 2–2; Tobias 1'; Zico 30' | | PRO–DHL 2–1; Nandinho 26' | | | | SCC–PRI 0–4; Zini 42' 51'; Mário Balbúrdia 43'; Bito 60' | PRO–DHL 2–1; Julinho x2 | RCA–SAG 1–0; Depú 19' | | | | SRC–BAI 2–0; Gui Tomás 21'; Lindala 82' | WIL–BMQ 2–2; Odilon 78'; Venâncio 81' | 14 |
| 29 | 24/7/21 | 24/7/21 | 24/7/21 | 24/7/21 | 24/7/21 | 24/7/21 | 24/7/21 | 24/7/21 | 24/7/21 | 24/7/21 | 24/7/21 | 24/7/21 | 24/7/21 | 24/7/21 | 24/7/21 | 24/7/21 | 18 |
| 29 | CCU–ACA 1–1; Germano 16' | BAI–INT 1–0; Man Pé 90' | BMQ–RCA 2–0; Da Banda 18'; Aguinaldo 25' | CCU–ACA 1–1; Tinaile 38' | | FHU–SCC 1–2; Edú Pessela 64' | | DHL–PET 0–1; Azulão 51' | PRI–SRC 4–2; Zini 2' 42' 59'; Atoubá 56' | | | RLB–WIL 1–0; Liliano 90+2' | SAG–PRO 2–0; Cachi 21'; Caranga 44' | FHU–SCC 1–2; Kadima 2'; Bonze 22' | PRI–SRC 4–2; Paulo 43'; Beny Papel 84' | | 18 |
| 30 | 31/7/21 | 30/7/21 | 30/7/21 | 30/7/21 | 31/7/21 | 31/7/21 | 30/7/21 | 31/7/21 | 31/7/21 | 30/7/21 | 31/7/21 | 31/7/21 | 31/7/21 | 30/7/21 | 30/7/21 | 30/7/21 | 13 |
| 30 | | | | | ACA–DHL 0–1; Nuno ' | PRI–FHU 4–1; Benvindo 73' | | | PRI–FHU 4–1; Bito 24'; Natael 31'; Zini 67'; Edú 85' o.g. | PRO–BMQ 2–0; Julinho ' Bebucho 75' | RCA–RLB 1–0; Depú 41' | | PET–SAG 0–1; Luís Tati 22' | SCC–CCU 2–0; Gláucio 47'; Hanilton 75' | | WIL–BAI 1–0; Caporal ' | 13 |
| T | 24 | 22 | 31 | 22 | 22 | 5 | 35 | 47 | 51 | 23 | 27 | 18 | 39 | 22 | 15 | 32 | 435 |

=== Top scorers ===
As of 24 July 2021

| Rank | Scorer | Club | Apps | Goals |
|---|---|---|---|---|
| 1 | (Brazil) Azulão | Petro de Luanda | 22(4) | 16 |
| 2 | (Angola) Zini | 1º de Agosto | 15(6) | 11 |
| 3 | (Angola) Dasfaa | Interclube | 19(4) | 10 |
| 4 | (Angola) Mabululu | 1º de Agosto | 20(3) | 9 |
| 5 | (Angola) Depú | Recreativo da Caála | 23(1) | 9 |

=== Hat-tricks ===
As of 24 July 2021

| Player | For | Against | S | R | Date |
|---|---|---|---|---|---|
| (Angola) Gazeta | Interclube | Ferroviário do Huambo | 5-0 (H) | 8 | 3 February 2021 |
| (Angola) Kaporal | Wiliete SC | Académica do Lobito | 6-2 (H) | 22 | 30 May 2021 |
| (Brazil) Azulão | Petro de Luanda | Progresso Sambizanga | 3-1 (H) | 23 | 6 June 2021 |
| (Angola) Zini | 1º de Agosto | Santa Rita de Cássia | 4-2 (H) | 29 | 24 July 2021 |
