= Juventude Atlético do Moxico =

Angolan football club

Juventude do Moxico
- Full name: Juventude Atlético do Moxico
- Ground: Estádio Mundunduleno; Luena, Angola
- Capacity: 1,500
- Chairman: Aniceto Júnior
- Manager: Fortunato Pascoal
- League: Girabola
- 2007: 14th
Home colours	Away colours

Juventude Atlético do Moxico, simply known Juventude do Moxico, and formerly known as Inter do Moxico is a football (soccer) club from Luena, Moxico province, Angola. The club was relegated from the Angolan Premier Division, Girabola in the end of the 2007 championship.

== History ==
On November 23, 2006, Inter Clube 4 de Junho do Moxico was renamed to its current name, Grupo Desportivo Atlético Juventude do Moxico.

In 2007, the club disputed its first Girabola (Angolan top level) as Juventude do Moxico.

== Stadium ==
Juventude do Moxico plays its home matches at Estádio Mundunduleno, which is also the home stadium and the property of F.C. Bravos do Maquis. The stadium was inaugurated on November 11, 2006, and has a maximum capacity of 1,500 people.

== See also ==
- Girabola
- Gira Angola
