= 2008 Girabola =

Girabola
- Season: 2008 (Mar 02–Nov 02)
- Champions: Petro de Luanda
- Relegated: Académica do Lobito; Primeiro de Maio; Kabuscorp
- CAF Champions League: Petro de Luanda (winner); 1º de Agosto (runner-up)
- Matches played: 182
- Goals scored: 367 (2.02 per match)
- Top goalscorer: Santana Carlos (20 goals)
- Biggest home win: Ben Lua 6–0 Pet Hua (11 Jul 2008)
- Biggest away win: Ben Lua 0–4 Pet Lua (2 Nov 2008)
- Highest scoring: Ben Lua 6–0 Pet Hua (12 Jul 2008)

The 2008 Girabola was the 30th season of the top-tier football league in Angola. The season ran from 2 March to 2 November 2008. Interclube were the defending champions.

The league comprised 14 teams and the bottom three were relegated to the 2009 Gira Angola.

Petro Atlético de Luanda were crowned champions, while Benfica do Lubango, Petro do Huambo and Sagrada Esperança were relegated. Santana Carlos of Petro Luanda finished as top scorer with 20 goals.

== FAF penalties ==
On its official weekly report 0032/SG/08, F.C. Bravos do Maquis forfeited 3 points regarding their 15 round home match against Primeiro de Maio.

== Changes from the 2007 season ==
Relegated: Académica do Soyo, Atlético do Namibe, Juventude do Moxico
Promoted: Bravos do Maquis, Kabuscorp, Recreativo do Libolo

Locations of the 2008 Girabola teams

== League table ==
Pos	Team	Pld	W	D	L	GF	GA	GD	Pts	Qualification or relegation
1	Petro de Luanda (C)	26	17	7	2	47	18	+29	58	Qualification for Champions League
2	Primeiro de Agosto	26	13	10	3	37	16	+21	49	Qualification for Champions League
3	Recreativo do Libolo	26	12	8	6	29	24	+5	44	
4	Santos FC	26	10	9	7	28	23	+5	39	
5	Benfica de Luanda	26	10	7	9	33	28	+5	37	
6	Primeiro de Maio	26	9	8	9	18	25	−7	35	
7	ASA	26	8	9	9	24	25	−1	33	
8	Kabuscorp	26	8	7	11	25	26	−1	31	
9	Desportivo da Huíla	26	6	13	7	23	26	−3	31	
10	Interclube	26	8	7	11	20	29	−9	31	
11	Bravos do Maquis	26	9	2	15	29	32	−3	29	
12	Sagrada Esperança (R)	26	6	10	10	20	27	−7	28	Relegation to Provincial stages
13	Petro do Huambo (R)	26	6	5	15	20	33	−13	23	Relegation to Provincial stages
14	Benfica do Lubango (R)	26	5	8	13	14	35	−21	23	Relegation to Provincial stages

Updated to match(es) played on 2 November 2008. Source: Girabola.com
Rules for classification: 1) Points; 2) Head-to-head points; 3) Head-to-head goal difference; 4) Goal difference; 5) Goals scored; 6) Fair-play points; 7) Play-off.
(C) Champions; (R) Relegated

== Results ==
Home \ Away	ASA	BEN	BLB	BRA	DES	INT	KAB	PET	PHU	PRI	MAI	LIB	SAG	SAN
ASA	—	1–0	1–2	1–0	1–1	2–0	0–2	1–1	0–0	0–1	2–0	2–4	1–1	2–0
Benfica de Luanda	0–1	—	3–2	4–3	1–1	1–0	3–1	0–4	6–0	0–0	0–1	2–0	2–1	1–1
Benfica do Lubango	0–0	0–1	—	1–0	2–2	0–0	1–0	0–1	0–1	0–0	1–1	0–2	1–0	0–1
Bravos do Maquis	1–2	1–0	5–0	—	1–0	1–0	2–1	1–2	2–1	1–3	4–0	0–0	2–1	1–2
Desportivo da Huíla	1–0	1–0	1–1	1–0	—	1–1	2–1	1–2	1–1	0–0	2–0	0–0	1–0	0–2
Interclube	1–0	3–3	2–0	1–0	2–1	—	2–1	0–3	1–0	0–1	1–1	1–1	0–1	0–3
Kabuscorp	1–1	0–1	1–0	2–0	1–1	0–1	—	2–1	1–0	0–0	3–1	0–0	1–1	1–0
Petro de Luanda	1–1	2–1	4–0	1–1	4–1	3–1	1–0	—	3–1	0–2	3–1	2–0	2–1	1–0
Petro do Huambo	0–0	0–1	0–1	2–1	1–1	0–0	3–1	0–2	—	0–2	1–0	0–1	4–0	1–2
Primeiro de Agosto	3–1	1–1	2–0	4–1	1–1	1–0	1–0	1–1	3–2	—	0–1	4–0	1–1	1–2
Primeiro de Maio	1–0	0–0	1–1	1–0	1–0	0–1	2–2	1–1	1–0	1–0	—	0–1	0–0	1–0
Recreativo do Libolo	2–1	2–1	3–0	1–0	1–1	2–0	1–3	1–2	1–0	1–1	1–0	—	2–2	1–1
Sagrada Esperança	1–1	0–0	2–0	1–0	1–0	1–0	1–0	0–0	0–1	1–3	1–1	0–1	—	1–1
Santos FC	1–2	2–1	1–1	0–1	1–1	2–2	0–0	0–0	2–1	1–1	0–1	1–0	2–1	—

Updated to match(es) played on 6 November 2008. Source: girabola.com
Legend: Blue = home team win; Yellow = draw; Red = away team win.

== Season statistics ==
=== Top scorers ===
Rank	Scorer	Club	Goals
1	(Angola) Santana Carlos	Petro Luanda	20
2	(Angola) Love	1º de Agosto	15
2	(Brazil) Reginaldo	Recreativo Libolo	15
3	(Angola) Rasca	Santos FC	11
4	(Angola) Vado	Benfica de Luanda	8

=== Pokers & Hat-tricks ===
Poker
Player	For	Against	Result	Rnd	Date	Ref
Vado	Benfica de Luanda	Petro do Huambo	6-0	15	July 11, 2008	
Hat-tricks
Player	For	Against	Result	Rnd	Date	Ref
Love	Primeiro de Agosto	Bravos do Maquis	1-3	23	October 4, 2008	
Santana Carlos	Petro de Luanda	Benfica do Lubango	4-0	23	October 5, 2008	
Santana Carlos	Petro de Luanda	Benfica de Luanda	0-4	26	November 2, 2008	

2008 Girabola winner
Atlético Petróleos de Luanda
14th title

Squad:
Hélder Cabral, Kivota, Lamá, Lamick (GK)
Cassoma, Etah, Hélder Vicente, Jamuana, Mabiná, Maninho, Miguel, Renato, Sérgio, Yamba Asha (DF)
Chara, Day Day, David, Job, Malamba, Nelo, Tunga, (MF)
Bennet, Humberto, Joca, Kembua, Rolf, Santana (FW)
Bernardino Pedroto (Head Coach)
