= Miloy =

Angolan footballer

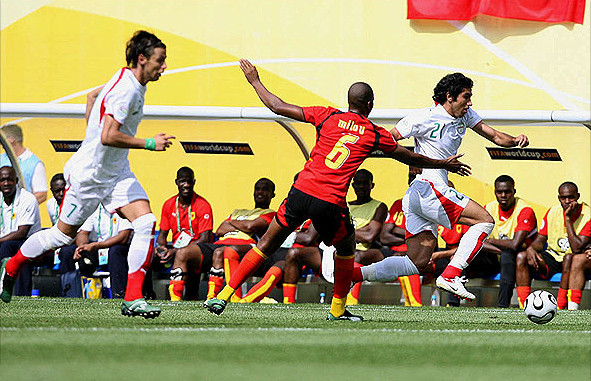

Personal information
- Full name: Marcos Hermenegildo Joaquim Henriques
- Date of birth: 27 May 1981 (age 45)
- Place of birth: Luanda, Angola
- Height: 1.81 m (5 ft 11 1/2 in)
- Position: Defensive midfielder

Senior career*
Years	Team	Apps	(Gls)
1998–2007	Interclube	118	(40)
2008	Santos de Angola	38	(2)

International career
1999–2006	Angola	13	(0)
- * Club domestic league appearances and goals

Marcos Hermenegildo Joaquim Henriques (born 27 May 1981 in Luanda), better known as Miloy, is a retired Angolan football midfielder.

== International career ==
He was a member of the national team, and was selected to the 2006 World Cup. He appeared in 3 World Cup games, 2 coming on as a sub.

== National team statistics ==
Angola national team
Year	Apps	Goals
1999	1	0
2000	0	0
2001	2	0
2002	1	0
2003	0	0
2004	0	0
2005	2	0
2006	7	0
Total	13	0
