= Kuagica David =

Angolan footballer (born 1990)

Personal information
- Full name: Kuagica Sebastião Bondo David
- Date of birth: 10 August 1990 (age 36)
- Place of birth: Luanda, Angola
- Height: 1.91 m (6 ft 3 in)
- Position: Defender

Youth career
- –2007: ADCE Diogo Cão
- 2007–2009: União da Madeira

Senior career*
Years	Team	Apps	(Gls)
2009–2010	Recreativo do Libolo		
2010	ASA		
2010–2011	Minangkabau		
2011	Nacional de Benguela		
2011–2012	Rochdale	0	(0)
2013	Recreativo do Libolo		
2014	1º de Agosto	29	(4)
2015–2017	Recreativo do Libolo	67	(5)
2018	Stumbras	9	(0)
2018–2019	Ermis Aradippou	25	(2)
2019–2020	Barnstaple Town	8	(0)
2020	Dulwich Hamlet	3	(0)

International career
2014–2016	Angola	8	(0)
- * Club domestic league appearances and goals as of 20:17, 17 January 2021 (UTC)

Kuagica Sebastião Bondo David (born 10 August 1990) is an Angolan professional footballer who plays as a defender.

== Career ==
Kuagica played youth football in Portugal for ADCE Diogo Cão and União da Madeira before returning to his country of birth and playing for Recreativo do Libolo and ASA. He played for Minangkabau in Indonesia in the 2010–11 season, followed by a brief return to Angola where he played for Nacional de Benguela. In November 2011, Kuagica signed for English club Rochdale on a deal until the end of the season. He was released in March 2012 having not made any first team appearances. Kuagica then once again returned to Angola where he had two further spells with Recreativo do Libolo, playing for 1º de Agosto in between. Kuagica then played in Lithuania and Cyprus for Stumbras and Ermis Aradippou respectively, then returned to England in 2019 to play for Southern Football League club Barnstaple Town. Later that season he joined National League South club Dulwich Hamlet. In August 2020 he agreed to stay with Dulwich for the 2020–21 season.
