= Estádio 1º de Maio (Malanje) =

Football stadium in Malanje, Angola

Coordinates: 09°32′58.5852″S 16°21′36.4896″E

- Interactive map of Estádio 1º de Maio
- Location: Malanje, Angola
- Capacity: 3,500

Construction
- Opened: February 2, 2005; 21 years ago

Tenant
- Baixa de Cassanje

Estádio 1º de Maio (1st of May stadium) is a state-owned football stadium in Angola's province of Malanje and is the venue for that province's clubs home games in the Segundona and the Girabola. The 3,500-seat stadium was inaugurated on February 2, 2005.

The stadium which underwent major reforms between April 2005 and February 2006, is named after the International Workers' Day.
