= Carlos Alves (footballer, born 1988) =

Portuguese footballer

Personal information
- Full name: Carlos Miguel Pereira Alves
- Date of birth: 6 February 1988 (age 38)
- Place of birth: Oeiras, Portugal
- Height: 1.77 m (5 ft 10 in)
- Position: Left back

Team information
- Current team: Olivais e Moscavide

Youth career
- 1998–2000: Valejas
- 2000–2007: Belenenses

Senior career*
Years	Team	Apps	(Gls)
2007–2009	Belenenses	0	(0)
2007–2008	→ Atlético (loan)	16	(1)
2008–2009	→ Oriental (loan)	13	(0)
2009–2010	Oriental	10	(1)
2010–2011	Olímpico Montijo	0	(0)
2011–2012	Oeiras	25	(1)
2012–2013	1º Dezembro	30	(0)
2013–2015	Oriental	25	(0)
2015–2017	Cova Piedade	35	(2)
2017–2018	Sintrense	23	(2)
2018–2019	Loures	12	(0)
2019–2020	1º Dezembro	12	(0)
2020–	Olivais e Moscavide	0	(0)

International career
2004	Portugal U16	2	(0)
2004–2005	Portugal U17	12	(1)
2005–2006	Portugal U18	7	(0)
2006–2007	Portugal U19	11	(0)
2008	Portugal U20	4	(0)
2009	Portugal U21	1	(0)
- * Club domestic league appearances and goals as of 1 August 2021

Carlos Miguel Pereira Alves (born 6 February 1988) is a Portuguese professional footballer who plays for Olivais e Moscavide as a left back.

== Club career ==
Born in Oeiras, Lisbon District, Alves finished his development at local C.F. Os Belenenses. He failed to appear in any competitive matches with the club, being subsequently loaned to neighbouring Atlético Clube de Portugal and Clube Oriental de Lisboa in the third division; in 2009, he signed permanently with the latter.

Alves continued competing in the lower leagues until the age of 26, successively representing C.O. Montijo, AD Oeiras, S.U. 1º de Dezembro and Oriental. In the 2013–14 season, he achieved promotion to the Segunda Liga with the latter team.
