= Santos Futebol Clube de Angola =

Angolan football club

Santos Futebol Clube
- Full name: Santos Futebol Clube de Angola
- Founded: 2002
- Ground: Estádio dos Coqueiros; Luanda, Angola
- Capacity: 12,000
- Website: santosfcangola.com
Home colours	Away colours

Santos Futebol Clube de Angola is an Angolan football club based in Viana. They play their home games at the Estádio dos Coqueiros and Estádio da Cidadela.

In 2014, the club's management announced that they would no longer maintain a men's senior category and instead focus on under-age categories seeking to achieve a strong team to compete at the Girabola in the near future.

== Achievements ==
- Angola Cup: 1

2008

- Angola Super Cup: 1

2009

== Performance in CAF competitions ==
- CAF Confederation Cup: 1 appearance

2009 – Group Stage

== Manager history and performance ==
Season	Coach	L2	L1	C	Coach	L2	L1	C	Coach	L2	L1	C
2003	(Brazil) Djalma Cavalcante	2nd										
2004		2nd										
2005		3rd										
2006	(Brazil) Pio Nogueira	1st										
2007	(Brazil) Pio Nogueira				(Angola) José Kilamba		11th	R16				
2008	(Angola) Mário Calado		4th	CH								
2009	(Angola) Mário Calado		6th	QF								
2010	(Angola) Mário Calado		13th	QF								
2011	(Angola) David Dias				(Angola) Romeu Filemon		11th	QF				
2012	(Angola) José Luís Borges				(Angola) Luís Quintas		13th	R16				
2013	(Angola) Luís Quintas		16th	R16								

== See also ==
- Girabola
  - 2013 Girabola
- Gira Angola
