= G.D. Baixa de Cassanje =

Angolan sports club

- Full name: Grupo Desportivo Heróis da Baixa de Cassanje
- Founded: 4 January 1999; 27 years ago
- Ground: Estádio 1º de Maio, Malanje
- Capacity: 3,500
- Manager: Paulo Saraiva
- League: Segundona
- 2020/21: ▼14th in Girabola
Home colours	Away colours

Grupo Desportivo Heróis da Baixa de Cassanje is an Angolan sports club from the city of Malanje, in the namesake province.

The club is named after the pro-independence rebellious group who participated in the Baixa de Cassanje revolt, an act that was carried out as part of Angola's anti-colonial war for independence.

Prior to qualifying to the Girabola, the club has been one of the most regular competitors in the qualifying tournament for the Girabola, having competed in a total 12 seasons from 2003 to 2006, from 2008 to 2013 and finally in 2020–21.

In 2020–21, the team qualified to the Girabola, as a result of a draw following the cancellation of the qualifying tournament for Angola's top division, the Segundona, due to the COVID-19 pandemic.

== Managers ==
- Kidumo Pedro (2003, 2004)
- Fortunato Pascoal (2004, 2005)
- Mateus Martins Bula (2006)
- Carlos Rafael Júnior (2007)
- Sarmento Seke, Zeca Nitoia (2008)
- Zeca Nitoia, Sermio Moisés (2009)
- Sermio Moisés (2010)
- Hélder Teixeira (2011)
- Fortunato Pascoal (2012)
- Sermio Moisés (2013)
- Mateus Martins Bula, Paulo Saraiva (Note: Paulo Saraiva replaced Manuel Martins in February 2021) (2019-20)

== Staff ==
Name	Nat	Pos
Technical staff
Paulo Saraiva	(Angola)	Head coach
Joaquim Piedade	(Angola)	Assistant Coach
Salomão Katimba	(Angola)	Assistant Coach
—	(Angola)	Goal-keeper Coach
Medical
	(Angola)	Physician
—	(Angola)	Physio
Management
	(Angola)	Chairman
