= Chinho =

Angolan footballer (1982–2019)

Personal information
- Full name: João dos Santos de Almeida
- Date of birth: 2 September 1982
- Place of birth: Luanda, Angola
- Date of death: 8 July 2019 (aged 36)
- Position: Midfielder

International career
Years	Team	Apps	(Gls)
2004–2009	Angola	13	(1)

João dos Santos de Almeida, also known as Chinho (2 September 1982 - 8 July 2019) was a former Angolan footballer who played as a midfielder. He made 13 appearances for the Angolan national team, scoring once.

Chinho holds the only African title ever achieved by Angola in football as they won the 2001 African Youth Championship in Ethiopia.

== Death ==
In mid-morning, 8 July 2019, Chinho was found shot dead inside his vehicle, at the Sapu neighborhood, in the outskirts of Luanda, shortly after leaving his office where he had just paid monthly wages to his employees. A witness has reportedly seen a motorcycle bumping on the rear side of his vehicle and as he stopped the vehicle and lowered the side window he was shot by the motorcycle's passenger several times at point-blank range and died on the scene.

== Career statistics ==
Appearances and goals by national team and year
National team	Year	Apps	Goals
Angola	2003	1	1
Angola	2004	6	0
Angola	2005	3	0
Angola	2006	3	0
Angola	2007	0	0
Angola	2008	0	0
Angola	2009	0	0
Total		13	1
