= Rasca (footballer) =

Angolan footballer

Personal information
- Full name: Maieco Domingos Henrique António
- Date of birth: 10 July 1982 (age 44)
- Place of birth: Angola
- Height: 1.82 m (6 ft 0 in)
- Position: Forward

Team information
- Current team: Santa Rita de Cássia FC

Senior career*
Years	Team	Apps	(Gls)
2009–2013	Recreativo do Libolo	18	
2013–2014	Benfica de Luanda		
2015–	Bravos do Maquis		
2016–	Porcelana FC		
2017–	Santa Rita de Cássia		

International career^{‡}
2010–	Angola	2	(0)
- * Club domestic league appearances and goals as of 1 September 2010 ‡ National team caps and goals as of 1 September 2010

Maieco Domingos Henrique António, commonly known as Rasca, (born 10 July 1982) is an Angola international football player.

Rasca plays club football for FC Cabinda. He made his debut for the Angola national football team in a friendly against Mexico in May 2010. He was also called up for 2012 African Cup of Nations qualifier against Uganda in August 2010.
