= 2018 Segundona =

Segundona
- Season: 2018
- Champions: ASA
- Biggest home win: Mpatu 3–0 Real M'buco (28 Jul 2018); S. Salvador 3–0 Mpatu (22 Aug 2018)
- Biggest away win: Mpatu 0–4 Santa Rita (21 Sep 2018)
- Highest scoring: S. Salvador 4–3 ASK Dragão (15 Jul 2018)
- Longest winning run: ASA (6) (14 Jul–01 Sep)
- Longest unbeaten run: ASA (9) (10 Jun–01 Sep)

The 2018 Segundona was the 24th season of the second-tier football league in Angola. The season started on 9 June.

The league comprises 2 series, one 4 and the other 5 teams, the winner of each series being automatically promoted to the 2018–19 Girabola while the runners-up of each group will contest for the third spot. At the end of the regular season, the three series winners will play a round-robin tournament to determine the league champion.

== Stadia and locations ==
Locations of the 2018 Segundona teams

P	Team	Home city	Stadium	Capacity	2017
–	ASA	Luanda	Estádio dos Coqueiros	8,000	DNP
–	AKC FC	Ondjiva	Estádio dos Castilhos	429	DNP
–	ASK Dragão	Uíge	Estádio 4 de Janeiro	12,000	3rd in Segundona Sr A
–	Bikuku FC	Saurimo	Estádio das Mangueiras	7,000	DNP
–	Ferroviário do Huambo	Huambo	Estádio do Ferrovia	10,000	3rd in Segundona Sr B
–	Jackson Garcia	Benguela	Estádio de S. Filipe	5,000	2nd in Segundona Sr B
–	Mpatu a Ponta	Caxito	Estádio Municipal	5,000	DNP
–	Real M'buco	Cabinda	Estádio Municipal do Tafe	9,000	DNP
–	Santa Rita de Cássia	Uíge	Estádio 4 de Janeiro	12,000	DNP
–	São Salvador	M'banza-Kongo	Estádio Municipal	–	DNP
–	Sporting de Benguela	Benguela	Edelfride Costa	6,000	DNP
–	Sporting do Bié	Kuito	Estádio dos Eucaliptos	16,000	DNP
–	U.R. Cuanza Norte	N'dalatando	Estádio Santos Diniz	5,000	DNP

== Draw ==
Serie A	Serie B
ASA; ASK Dragão; Mpatu a Ponta; Real M'buco; Santa Rita de Cássia; U.R. Cuanza Norte; São Salvador	AKC FC; Bikuku FC; Ferroviário do Huambo; Jackson Garcia; Sporting de Benguela; Sporting do Bié

All teams in each group play in a double round robin system (home and away).

== Serie A ==
=== Match details ===
Round 1

Sat, 09 Jun 2018	Real M'buco	1–2	Mpatu a Ponta	Cabinda
15:00	Ângelo 7'		25' Savané; Adebá	Stadium: Tafe

Sun, 10 Jun 2018	ASA	2–1	ASK Dragão	Luanda
15:00	Djemba Djemba 11'; Kibeixa		Lucas	Stadium: 22 de Junho

Sat, 09 Jun 2018	~~S^{ta} Rita de Cássia~~	2–0	~~U.R. Cuanza Norte~~	Uíge
15:00	Samy 60'; Modeste 82'			Stadium: 4 de Janeiro

Round 8

Sat, 28 Jul 2018	Mpatu a Ponta	3–0	Real M'buco	Caxito
15:00				Stadium: Municipal

Sat, 28 Jul 2018	ASK Dragão	0–1	ASA	Uíge
15:00				Stadium: 4 de Janeiro

Sat, 28 Jul 2018	~~U.R. Cuanza Norte~~	–	~~S^{ta} Rita de Cássia~~	N'dalatando
15:00				Stadium: Santos Diniz

Round 2

Sat, 16 Jun 2018	~~U.R. Cuanza Norte~~	0–1	~~ASA~~	N'dalatando
15:00			56' M.Filipe	Stadium: Santos Diniz

Sun, 17 Jun 2018	ASK Dragão	Walkover	Real M'buco	Uíge
15:00				Stadium: 4 de Janeiro

Sun, 17 Jun 2018	São Salvador	2–3	S^{ta} Rita de Cássia	M'banza-Kongo
15:00				Stadium: Municipal

Round 9

Sat, 04 Aug 2018	~~ASA~~	Cancelled	~~U.R. Cuanza Norte~~	Luanda
15:00				Stadium: Coqueiros

Sun, 05 Aug 2018	Real M'buco	0–2	ASK Dragão	Cabinda
15:00				Stadium: Tafe

Sat, 04 Aug 2018	S^{ta} Rita de Cássia	2–1	São Salvador	Uíge
15:00	Kimuanga 1' (o.g.); Iniesta 75'		63' Lewandoski	Stadium: 4 de Janeiro

Round 3

Sat, 23 Jun 2018	Mpatu a Ponta	1–1	ASK Dragão	Caxito
15:00			(pen.) Lucas	Stadium: Municipal

Sat, 23 Jun 2018	ASA	4–2	São Salvador	Luanda
15:30				Stadium: Coqueiros

Sun, 24 Jun 2018	~~Real M'buco~~	1–1	~~U.R. Cuanza Norte~~	Cabinda
15:00				Stadium: Tafe

Round 10

Sat, 11 Aug 2018	ASK Dragão	1–0	Mpatu a Ponta	Uíge
15:00				Stadium: 4 de Janeiro

Sun, 12 Aug 2018	São Salvador	0–1	ASA	M'banza-Kongo
15:00				Stadium: Municipal

Sat, 11 Aug 2018	~~U.R. Cuanza Norte~~	Cancelled	~~Real M'buco~~	N'dalatando
15:00				Stadium: Santos Diniz

Round 4

Sat, 30 Jun 2018	~~U.R. Cuanza Norte~~	Walkover	~~Mpatu a Ponta~~	N'dalatando
15:00				Stadium: Santos Diniz

Sat, 30 Jun 2018	S^{ta} Rita de Cássia	0–0	ASA	Uíge
15:00				Stadium: 4 de Janeiro

Sun, 01 Jul 2018	São Salvador	3–2	Real M'buco	M'banza-Kongo
15:00				Stadium: Álvaro Mbuta

Round 11

Sat, 18 Aug 2018	~~Mpatu a Ponta~~	Cancelled	~~U.R. Cuanza Norte~~	Caxito
15:00				Stadium: Municipal

Sun, 19 Aug 2018	ASA	3–2	S^{ta} Rita de Cássia	Luanda
15:00	Fundo 25'; Kibeixa 45', 90+7'		61', 80' Modeste	Stadium: Coqueiros; Referee: Avelino Chivela, José Fernando, Lucas Caliombo

Sat, 18 Aug 2018	Real M'buco	–	São Salvador	Cabinda
15:00				Stadium: Tafe

Round 5

Sat, 07 Jul 2018	~~ASK Dragão~~	2–0	~~U.R. Cuanza Norte~~	Uíge
15:00				Stadium: 4 de Janeiro

Sat, 07 Jul 2018	Mpatu a Ponta	3–1	São Salvador	Caxito
15:30				Stadium: Municipal

Sun, 08 Jul 2018	Real M'buco	1–2	S^{ta} Rita de Cássia	Cabinda
15:00				Stadium: Tafe

Round 12

Sat, 25 Aug 2018	~~U.R. Cuanza Norte~~	Cancelled	~~ASK Dragão~~	N'dalatando
15:00				Stadium: Santos Diniz

Wed, 22 Aug 2018	São Salvador	3–0	Mpatu a Ponta	M'banza-Kongo
15:00				Stadium: Municipal

Sat, 25 Aug 2018	S^{ta} Rita de Cássia	2–0	Real M'buco	Uíge
15:00				Stadium: 4 de Janeiro

Round 6

Sat, 14 Jul 2018	ASA	2–0	Real M'buco	Luanda
15:00				Stadium: Coqueiros

Sat, 14 Jul 2018	S^{ta} Rita de Cássia	2–1	Mpatu a Ponta	Uíge
15:00				Stadium: 4 de Janeiro

Sun, 15 Jul 2018	São Salvador	4–3	ASK Dragão	M'banza-Kongo
15:00				Stadium: Álvaro Mbuta

Round 13

Sat, 01 Sep 2018	Real M'buco	–	ASA	Cabinda
15:00				Stadium: Tafe

Sat, 01 Sep 2018	Mpatu a Ponta	0–4	S^{ta} Rita de Cássia	Caxito
15:00				Stadium: Municipal

Sun, 26 Aug 2018	ASK Dragão	2–0	São Salvador	Uíge
15:00				Stadium: 4 de Janeiro

Round 7

Sat, 21 Jul 2018	Mpatu a Ponta	0–1	ASA	Caxito
15:00				Stadium: Municipal

Sun, 22 Jul 2018	ASK Dragão	0–1	S^{ta} Rita de Cássia	Uíge
15:00			90+2' Modeste	Stadium: 4 de Janeiro

Sun, 22 Jul 2018	~~U.R. Cuanza Norte~~	Walkover	~~São Salvador~~	N'dalatando
15:00				Stadium: Santos Diniz

Round 14

Sat, 01 Sep 2018	ASA	1–0	Mpatu a Ponta	Luanda
15:00				Stadium: Coqueiros

Sat, 01 Sep 2018	S^{ta} Rita de Cássia	2–1	ASK Dragão	Uíge
15:00			28' Lucas	Stadium: 4 de Janeiro

Sat, 01 Sep 2018	~~São Salvador~~	Cancelled	~~U.R. Cuanza Norte~~	M'banza-Kongo
15:00				Stadium: Municipal

=== Table and results ===
Pos	Team	Pld	W	D	L	GF	GA	GD	Pts	Qualification or relegation	ASA	SRC	ASK	SSA	MPA	REA	UCN
1	ASA (C)	8	7	1	0	13	5	+8	22	Qualification for Girabola		3–2	2–1	4–2	1–0	2–0	–
2	Santa Rita de Cássia	8	6	1	1	16	8	+8	19	Qualification for Girabola playoff	0–0		2–1	2–1	2–1	2–0	~~2–0~~
3	ASK Dragão	8	2	1	5	9	11	−2	7		0–1	0–1		2–0	1–0	wo	~~2–0~~
4	São Salvador	8	2	0	6	13	18	−5	6		0–1	2–3	4–3		3–0	3–2	–
5	Mpatu a Ponta	8	1	1	6	5	14	−9	4		0–1	0–4	1–1	3–1		3–0	–
6	Real M'buco (D)	2	0	1	1	5	20	−15	1	Disqualified	–	1–2	0–2	–	1–2		~~1–1~~
7	União Cuanza Norte (D)	6	0	1	5	1	12	−11	1	Disqualified	~~0–1~~	–	–	~~wo~~	~~wo~~	–	

Updated to match(es) played on 10 June 2018. Source: Girabola.com
Rules for classification: 1) Points; 2) Head-to-head points; 3) Head-to-head goal difference; 4) Goal difference; 5) Goals scored; 6) Fair-play points; 7) Play-off.
(C) Champions; (D) Disqualified

== Serie B ==
=== Match details ===
Round 1

Sat, 09 Jun 2018	Sporting do Bié	3–2	Bikuku FC	Kuito
15:00	Kandjila 10', 70', 90+3'		2' Agoya; 14' Lau	Stadium: Eucaliptos

Sat, 09 Jun 2018	Jackson Garcia	2–1	Ferrovia do Huambo	Benguela
15:00	Larama; L.Huango		38' Milton	Stadium: São Filipe

Sat, 09 Jun 2018	Sporting de Benguela	0–0	AKC FC	Benguela
15:00				Stadium: Edelfride Costa

Round 6

Sat, 21 Jul 2018	Bikuku FC	6–2	Sporting do Bié	Saurimo
15:00	Fiston 22' (pen.); Abel 50', 64', 82'; João 69'; Agoya 90+4'	Report	16', 90+2' Kanjila	Stadium: Mangueiras; Referee: Mbunga Nkazi, Sérgio David, Regina Ngola

Sat, 21 Jul 2018	Ferrovia do Huambo	0–0	Jackson Garcia	Huambo
15:00				Stadium: Kurikutelas

Sun, 22 Jul 2018	AKC FC	3–1	Sporting de Benguela	Ondjiva
15:00				Stadium: Castilhos

Round 2

Sat, 16 Jun 2018	Ferrovia do Huambo	3–2	Sporting do Bié	Huambo
15:00	Betinho 42'; Viví 59'; Nilton 79'	Report	24' Monteiro; 51' Jacinto	Stadium: Kurikutelas; Referee: Ernesto Magalhães, Evandro da Rocha, João Fula

Sun, 17 Jun 2018	Bikuku FC	1–0	Sporting de Benguela	Saurimo
15:00	Ibra 69'	Report		Stadium: Mangueiras; Referee: Sanda Kitu, António Miguel, Odreia Miguel

Sun, 17 Jun 2018	AKC FC	0–1	Jackson Garcia	Ondjiva
15:00				Stadium: Castilhos

Round 7

Sat, 28 Jul 2018	Sporting do Bié	0–2	Ferrovia do Huambo	Kuito
15:00			29' Bance; 60' Bumba	Stadium: Eucaliptos

Sat, 28 Jul 2018	Sporting de Benguela	1–0	Bikuku FC	Benguela
15:00				Stadium: Edelfride Costa

Sat, 28 Jul 2018	Jackson Garcia	1–1	AKC FC	Benguela
15:00				Stadium: São Filipe

Round 3

Sat, 23 Jun 2018	Bikuku FC	2–1	Ferrovia do Huambo	Saurimo
15:00	Yuri 65'; Hervé 75'	Report	29' Adérito	Stadium: Mangueiras; Referee: Dossaciano Mulumba, Alexandre Kapola, Txibualua Luhemo

Sat, 23 Jun 2018	Sporting de Benguela	1–1	Jackson Garcia	Benguela
15:00				Stadium: Edelfride Costa

Sun, 24 Jun 2018	Sporting do Bié	1–0	AKC FC	Kuito
15:00				Stadium: Eucaliptos

Round 8

Sat, 04 Aug 2018	Ferrovia do Huambo	1–0	Bikuku FC	Huambo
15:00	Tchony 21'			Stadium: Kurikutelas

Sun, 05 Aug 2018	Jackson Garcia	1–0	Sporting de Benguela	Benguela
15:00				Stadium: São Filipe

Sun, 05 Aug 2018	AKC FC	1–1	Sporting do Bié	Ondjiva
15:00				Stadium: Castilhos

Round 4

Sat, 30 Jun 2018	Ferrovia do Huambo	2–0	Sporting de Benguela	Huambo
15:00				Stadium: Kurikutelas

Sat, 30 Jun 2018	AKC FC	2–1	Bikuku FC	Ondjiva
15:00				Stadium: Castilhos

Sat, 30 Jun 2018	Jackson Garcia	3–3	Sporting do Bié	Benguela
15:00				Stadium: Ombaka

Round 9

Sat, 11 Aug 2018	Sporting de Benguela	0–1	Ferrovia do Huambo	Benguela
15:00				Stadium: Edelfride Costa

Sun, 12 Aug 2018	Bikuku FC	3–0	AKC FC	Saurimo
15:00	Ibra 19'; Abel 45+4'; Law 75'	Report		Stadium: Mangueiras; Referee: Rafael Dala, Nelson Kiala, Pedro Micolo

Sat, 11 Aug 2018	Sporting do Bié	2–0	Jackson Garcia	Kuito
15:00	Jacinto 80'; Ngueve 90+2' (pen.)			Stadium: Eucaliptos; Referee: Edson Essoco

Round 5

Sat, 07 Jul 2018	Bikuku FC	2–1	Jackson Garcia	Saurimo
15:00	Chara 5'; Abel 8'	Report	87' (pen.) Okacha	Stadium: Mangueiras; Referee: Francisco Mazale, Nelson Silva, Domingos Ferreira

Sat, 07 Jul 2018	Sporting do Bié	0–2	Sporting de Benguela	Kuito
15:00			Resistência; Mauro	Stadium: Eucaliptos

Sun, 08 Jul 2018	Ferrovia do Huambo	0–2	AKC FC	Huambo
15:00				Stadium: Kurikutelas

Round 10

Sat, 18 Aug 2018	Jackson Garcia	1–2	Bikuku FC	Benguela
15:00	Máquina 81'		90+2' Agoya; 90+4' Glod	Stadium: São Filipe; Referee: João Mavungo, Evaristo Bosco, João Bundo

Sat, 18 Aug 2018	Sporting de Benguela	1–0	Sporting do Bié	Benguela
15:00				Stadium: Edelfride Costa

Sat, 18 Aug 2018	AKC FC	1–1	Ferrovia do Huambo	Ondjiva
15:00	Yoyó 81'		77' (pen.) Zé	Stadium: Castilhos; Referee: Miguel Américo

=== Table and results ===
Pos	Team	Pld	W	D	L	GF	GA	GD	Pts	Qualification or relegation	BIK	FER	JAC	AKC	SCB	SBI
1	Bikuku FC (Note: Later changed their name to Saurimo FC)	10	6	0	4	19	12	+7	18	Qualification for Girabola		2–1	2–1	3–0	1–0	6–2
2	Ferroviário do Huambo	10	5	2	3	12	9	+3	17	Qualification for Girabola playoff	1–0		0–0	0–2	2–0	3–2
3	Jackson Garcia	10	3	4	3	11	12	−1	13 (Note: Head-to-head results: AKC 0 Jackson 1; Jackson 1 AKC 1.)		1–2	2–1		1–1	1–0	3–3
4	AKC FC	10	3	4	3	10	10	0	13		2–1	1–1	0–1		3–1	1–1
5	Sporting de Benguela	10	3	2	5	6	9	−3	11 (Note: Head-to-head results: Sp Bié 0 Sp Benguela 2; Sp Benguela 1 Sp Bié 0.)		1–0	0–1	1–1	0–0		1–0
6	Sporting do Bié	10	3	2	5	14	20	−6	11		3–2	0–2	2–0	1–0	0–2	

Updated to match(es) played on 18 August 2018. Source: Girabola.com
Rules for classification: 1) Points; 2) Head-to-head points; 3) Head-to-head goal difference; 4) Goal difference; 5) Goals scored; 6) Fair-play points; 7) Play-off.

== 2018–19 Girabola playoff ==
Sat, 08 Sep 2018	Ferroviário do Huambo	1–2 (1–2 agg.)	Santa Rita de Cássia	Huambo
15:00	Bumba 62'	Report	3' Modeste; 41' Iniesta	Stadium: Ferrovia; Referee: António Dungula, Tito Capingala, José Siliya

Sat, 15 Sep 2018	Santa Rita de Cássia	1–1 (3–2 agg.)	Ferroviário do Huambo	Uíge
15:00	Foquinho 80'		60' (o.g.) Sebas	Stadium: 4 de Janeiro; Referee: Benjamin Andrade, Manuel Benguela, B. Ngulo

== 2018 Segundona title match ==
Wed, 12 Sep 2018	ASA	2–1	Bikuku FC	Luanda
15:00	Victoriano 53'; Kibeixa 77' (pen.)		15' Ibrah	Stadium: Estádio dos Coqueiros; Referee: João Goma, Júlio Lemos, João Fula

== Season statistics ==
=== Hat-tricks ===
Player	For	Against	Result	Ref	Date
Kanjila	Sporting do Bié	Bikuku FC	3-2		9 June 2018
Abel	Bikuku FC	Sporting do Bié	6-2		21 July 2018

== See also ==
- 2018 Girabola
