= 2022–23 Angola Cup =

Tournament details
- Country: Angola
- Dates: 29 March – 3 June 2023
- Teams: 23

Final positions
- Champions: Petro de Luanda
- Runners-up: Académica do Lobito

Tournament statistics
- Matches played: 24
- Goals scored: 55 (2.29 per match)
- All statistics correct as of 29 June 2023.

The 2022–23 Taça de Angola was the 41st edition of the Taça de Angola, the second most important and the top knock-out football club competition in Angola following the Girabola.

Petro de Luanda won the tournament by beating Académica do Lobito 3–0 in the final and secure their 14th title.

== Stadia and locations ==
Locations of the 2020–21 Angola Cup teams

P	Team	Home city	Stadium	Capacity	2017	Current
–	Académica do Lobito	Lobito	Estádio do Buraco	3,000	R16	R16
–	AKC FC	Ondjiva	Estádio dos Castilhos	429	PR	PR
–	ASA	Luanda	Estádio da Cidadela	60,000	R16	R16
–	Benfica do Lubango	Lubango	Estádio do Ferroviário	25,000	DNP	WD
–	Bravos do Maquis	Luena	Estádio Mundunduleno	4,300	SF	QF
–	Semba FC	Cabinda	Estádio do Tafe	25,000	DNP	WD
–	Cuando Cubango FC	Kuito	Estádio dos Eucaliptos	3,300	DNP	R16
–	Desportivo da Huíla	Lubango	Estádio do Ferroviário	25,000	DNP	Runner-Up
–	Domant FC	Caxito	Estádio Municipal do Dande	5,000	R16	R16
–	Ferroviário do Huambo	Huambo	Estádio dos Kurikutelas	10,000	DNP	WD
–	Interclube	Luanda	Estádio 22 de Junho	7,000	QF	SF
–	Kabuscorp	Luanda	Estádio dos Coqueiros	8,000	QF	QF
–	Paulo FC	Caxito	Estádio Municipal do Dande	5,000	R16	DQ
–	Petro de Luanda	Luanda	Estádio 11 de Novembro	50,000	Champion	SF
–	Primeiro de Agosto	Luanda	Estádio 11 de Novembro	50,000	Runner-Up	Champion
–	Primeiro de Maio	Benguela	Estádio Edelfride Costa	6,000	QF	PR
–	Progresso do Sambizanga	Luanda	Estádio dos Coqueiros	8,000	SF	QF
–	Recreativo da Caála	Caála	Estádio Mártires da Canhala	12,000	R16	R16
–	Recreativo do Libolo	Calulo	Estádio Municipal de Calulo	10,000	R16	R16
–	Sagrada Esperança	Dundo	Estádio Sagrada Esperança	8,000	R16	R16
–	Santa Rita de Cássia	Uíge	Estádio 4 de Janeiro	12,000	QF	QF
–	Saurimo FC	Saurimo	Estádio das Mangueiras	7,000	R16	PR
–	Sporting de Cabinda	Cabinda	Estádio do Tafe	25,000	PR	WD
–	Wiliete SC	Benguela	Estádio Edelfride Costa	6,000	DNP	R16

== Preliminary rounds ==
Wed, 29 Mar 2023 PR	B. do Simulambuco	Walkover	Cuando Cubango	Cabinda
15:00				Stadium: Estádio do Tafe

Wed, 29 Mar 2023 PR	Desportivo Lunda Sul	2–1	Baixa de Cassanje	Saurimo
15:00	Filhão 19', 34'		53' Magrinho	Stadium: Estádio das Mangueiras; Referee: Paulo Sérgio

Wed, 29 Mar 2023 PR	Desportivo do Pombo	1–3	Recreativo do Libolo	Uíge
15:00	Ribéry 56'		3', 44' Ning; 45' (pen.) Pino	Stadium: 4 de Janeiro; Referee: José Maxia; Cláudio Vunge, Flávio Dias

Wed, 29 Mar 2023 PR	Jovens de Hoje	Walkover	Santa Rita	Luena
15:00				Stadium: Mundunduleno

Wed, 29 Mar 2023 PR	Kabuscorp	2–0	Ferrovia do Huambo	Luanda
15:00	Amaro 18' (pen.); Adilson 30'			Stadium: Estádio dos Coqueiros; Referee: Bernardo Nangolo; Jeremias Cafussa, Pedro Alberto

Wed, 29 Mar 2023 PR	Mundo Verde	1–3	Petro de Luanda	Sumbe
15:00	CK 21'		77' Vidinho; 85' Azulão; 87' Maya	Stadium: Estádio Hoji Ya Henda; Referee: Feliciano Lucas; Alexandre Bengue, Horácio Tchissingue

Wed, 29 Mar 2023 PR	Recreativo da Caála	Walkover	Sporting de Cabinda	Caála
15:00				Stadium: Estádio Mártires da Canhala

Wed, 29 Mar 2023 PR	Sporting do Bié	3–2	Progresso Sambizanga	Cuíto
15:00	João 21', 70'; Caquenha 65'		15' (pen.) Kiloy; 81' Ginebe	Stadium: Estádio dos Eucaliptos; Referee: Rodrigues Aleixo; Nicodemos Calembela, Francisco Paulo

== Round of 16 ==
Wed, 12 Apr 2023 R16	Desportivo Lunda Sul	0–2	Sagrada Esperança	Saurimo
15:00			10' Celso; 70' Jó Paciência	Stadium: Estádio das Mangueiras; Referee: Paulo Sérgio; Segunda Tchisseque, Lídio Coimbra

Thu, 13 Apr 2023 R16	Jovens de Hoje	2–6	1º de Agosto	Saurimo
15:00	Gorbacé 16'; Benjamin 43'	Report	5' Jó; 20' Melono; 46' Aldair; 53' Manelé; 58' Catraio; 79' (pen.) Mabululu	Stadium: Estádio das Mangueiras; Referee: Bernardo Moreira; Aldair Carmelino, Evandro da Rocha

Tue, 11 Apr 2023 R16	Kabuscorp	5–1	Sporting de Benguela	Luanda
15:00	Adilson; Juve 19' (o.g.); Cuxixima 20', 42'		Juve	Stadium: Estádio dos Coqueiros

Wed, 12 Apr 2023 R16	Petro de Luanda	1–0	Académica do Lobito	Lobito
15:00	Vidinho 6'			Stadium: Buraco

Wed, 12 Apr 2023 R16	Recreativo da Caála	3–0	Wiliete SC	Caála
15:00	Gildo 26'; Deco 51'; Depú 63'			Stadium: Estádio Mártires da Canhala; Referee: Rafael Dala; Nelson Kiala, Celso António

Wed, 12 Apr 2023 R16	Recreativo do Libolo	Walkover	Desportivo da Huíla	Calulo
15:00				Stadium: Municipal de Calulo

Wed, 12 Apr 2023 R16	Sporting do Bié	0–1	Interclube	Cuíto
15:00			80' Wilfried	Stadium: Estádio dos Eucaliptos; Referee: Benjamin Andrade; Manuel Benguela, Bernabé Ngulo

Wed, 12 Apr 2023 R16	B. do Simulambuco	0–1	Bravos do Maquis	Cabinda
15:00			19' Zico	Stadium: Estádio do Tafe

== Quarter-finals ==
Wed, 24 May 2023 QF	Petro de Luanda	2–0	Sagrada Esperança	Caála
15:00				Stadium: Mártires da Canhala; Referee: Paulo Sérgio; Segunda Tchisseque, Lídio Coimbra

Wed, 24 May 2023 QF	Interclube	2–0	1º de Agosto	Luena
15:00	Estevão 51'; Da Banda 57'	Report	8', 20' Moya; 29' Melono	Stadium: Estádio Mundunduleno; Referee: Benjamin Andrade; Bernabé Ngulo, Manuel Benguela

Wed, 24 May 2023 QF	Académica do Lobito	3–1	Desportivo da Huíla	Dundo
15:00	Cachi 43'		85' Sebas	Stadium: Sagrada Esperança; Referee: Bernardo Nangolo; Pedro Alberto, António Pitra

Wed, 24 May 2023 QF	Isaac e Filhos	1–2	Kabuscorp	Luanda
15:00	Vidinho 49'			Stadium: 11 de Novembro; Referee: Carlos Silva; Manuel Lobe, Alberto Dumbi

== Semifinals ==
Sun, 28 May 2023 SF	Kabuscorp	1–2	Académica do Lobito	Luanda
15:00	Nelito 42'; Amaro 79'		65' Dasfaa; 27', 47' Wilfried	Stadium: Estádio dos Coqueiros; Referee: Miguel Mateus; Luís Mateus, António Teixeira

Sun, 28 May 2023 SF	Interclube	0–1	Petro de Luanda	Luanda
16:30	Maya 15'; Yano 88'			Stadium: 11 de Novembro; Referee: José Chitumba; Estanislau Guedes, Rosário Calembela

== Final ==
Sat, 3 Jun 2023
15:00

Petro de Luanda	3–0	Académica do Lobito
Azulão 18', 26'; Carlinhos 77'	Report

Estádio da Tundavala, Lubango
Attendance: 12,000
Referee: Mauro de Oliveira

Petro	Académica

GK	23	(Angola)	Hugo Marques
RB	25	(Angola)	Eddie
CB	4	(Portugal)	Pedro Pinto
CB	24	(Angola)	Quinito
LB	13	(Angola)	Tó Carneiro
RM	10	(Angola)	Megue		(substituted off) 73'
CM	3	(Angola)	Ito	(yellow card) 87'
CM	21	(Brazil)	Gleison
LM	11	(Angola)	Jaredi		(substituted off) 73'
FW	9	(Brazil)	Azulão (c)		(substituted off) 89'
FW	27	(Angola)	Gilberto	(yellow card) 84'	(substituted off) 89'
Substitutions:
FW	7	(Brazil)	Anderson		(substituted on) 73'
MF	8	(Angola)	Carlinhos		(substituted on) 73'
MF	14	(Portugal)	Inácio		(substituted on) 89'
MF	9	(Angola)	Yano		(substituted on) 89'
Manager:
(Portugal) Alexandre Santos

GK	12	(Angola)	Nathan
RB	2	(Angola)	Amor (c)
CB	20	(Angola)	Valdez	(yellow card) 54' (yellow-red card) 61'
CB	23	(Angola)	Caprego	(yellow card) 69'
LB	18	(Angola)	Edú Pessela		(substituted off) 45'
RM	14	(Angola)	Paty		(substituted off) 90+2'
CM	6	(Angola)	Nandinho
CM	8	(Republic of the Congo)	Kaya		(substituted off) 67'
LM	21	(Angola)	Panilson		(substituted off) 76'
FW	7	(Cameroon)	Dasfaa
FW	9	(Ivory Coast)	Wilfried		(substituted off) 90+2'
Substitutions:
MF	10	(Angola)	Higino		(substituted on) 45'
MF	11	(Angola)	Jaredi		(substituted on) 67'
MF	15	(Angola)	Mano Calesso		(substituted on) 76'
MF	33	(Angola)	Dji		(substituted on) 90+2'
FW	18	(Angola)	Gazeta		(substituted on) 90+2'
Manager:
(Angola) Agostinho Tramagal

Assistant referees:
Lucas Caliongo
Joaquim Chiyo

Fourth official:

Commissioner:

== See also ==
- 2022–23 Girabola
- 2022–23 Angola Super Cup
- 2023–24 CAF Confederation Cup
