= 2019–20 Angola Cup =

Tournament details
- Country: Angola
- Dates: 11 Jan – 18 Mar 2020
- Teams: 23

Final positions
- Champions: Cancelled

Tournament statistics
- Matches played: 24
- Goals scored: 55 (2.29 per match)
- All statistics correct as of 2 December 2021.

The 2019–20 Taça de Angola was the 38th edition of the Taça de Angola, the second most important and the top knock-out football club competition in Angola following the Girabola.

The tournament was cancelled due to the COVID 19 pandemic.

== Stadia and locations ==
Locations of the 2019–20 Angola Cup teams

P	Team	Home city	Stadium	Capacity	2017	Current
–	Académica do Lobito	Lobito	Estádio do Buraco	3,000	R16	R16
–	AKC FC	Ondjiva	Estádio dos Castilhos	429	PR	PR
–	ASA	Luanda	Estádio da Cidadela	60,000	R16	R16
–	Benfica do Lubango	Lubango	Estádio do Ferroviário	25,000	DNP	WD
–	Bravos do Maquis	Luena	Estádio Mundunduleno	4,300	SF	QF
–	Semba FC	Cabinda	Estádio do Tafe	25,000	DNP	WD
–	Cuando Cubango FC	Kuito	Estádio dos Eucaliptos	3,300	DNP	R16
–	Desportivo da Huíla	Lubango	Estádio do Ferroviário	25,000	DNP	Runner-Up
–	Domant FC	Caxito	Estádio Municipal do Dande	5,000	R16	R16
–	Ferroviário do Huambo	Huambo	Estádio dos Kurikutelas	10,000	DNP	WD
–	Interclube	Luanda	Estádio 22 de Junho	7,000	QF	SF
–	Kabuscorp	Luanda	Estádio dos Coqueiros	8,000	QF	QF
–	Paulo FC	Caxito	Estádio Municipal do Dande	5,000	R16	DQ
–	Petro de Luanda	Luanda	Estádio 11 de Novembro	50,000	Champion	SF
–	Primeiro de Agosto	Luanda	Estádio 11 de Novembro	50,000	Runner-Up	Champion
–	Primeiro de Maio	Benguela	Estádio Edelfride Costa	6,000	QF	PR
–	Progresso do Sambizanga	Luanda	Estádio dos Coqueiros	8,000	SF	QF
–	Recreativo da Caála	Caála	Estádio Mártires da Canhala	12,000	R16	R16
–	Recreativo do Libolo	Calulo	Estádio Municipal de Calulo	10,000	R16	R16
–	Sagrada Esperança	Dundo	Estádio Sagrada Esperança	8,000	R16	R16
–	Santa Rita de Cássia	Uíge	Estádio 4 de Janeiro	12,000	QF	QF
–	Saurimo FC	Saurimo	Estádio das Mangueiras	7,000	R16	PR
–	Sporting de Cabinda	Cabinda	Estádio do Tafe	25,000	PR	WD
–	Wiliete SC	Benguela	Estádio Edelfride Costa	6,000	DNP	R16

== Preliminary rounds ==
Sat, 11 Jan 2020 PR	ASK Dragão	1–1 (3–4 p)	Académica Lobito	Uíge
15:00	Galax 30'	Report	50' Gerry	Stadium: Estádio 4 de Janeiro; Referee: Miguel Mateus; Júlio Mateus, Luís Mateus
	Penalties
	Galax (penalty scored); Firmino (penalty scored); Jorge (penalty scored)		(penalty scored) Lito; (penalty scored) Sozito; (penalty scored) Germano; (penalty scored) Valdez

Sat, 11 Jan 2020 PR	B. do Simulambuco	1–0	Paulo FC	Cabinda
15:00				Stadium: Estádio do Tafe; Referee: Sabino de Carvalho; Pedro Futa, Ladislau Miguel

Sat, 11 Jan 2020 PR	Rec do Libolo	0–1	Sagrada Esperança	Calulo
15:00			Lépua	Stadium: Municipal de Calulo

Sun, 12 Jan 2020 PR	Ferrovia do Huambo	2–4	Primeiro de Maio (Note: 1º de Maio were evicted from the tournament after being evicted from Girabola following a double loss by default)	Huambo
15:00	Chabalala 41' (pen.); Valente 50'	Report	11' Dinho; 52' Andy; 72', 80' (pen.) Jojó	Stadium: Estádio dos Kurikutelas; Referee: Bernardo Moreira; João Fula, Aldair Carmelino

Sun, 12 Jan 2020 PR	Cuando Cubango	0–0 (3–4 p)	Wiliete SC	Cuíto
15:00		Report		Stadium: Estádio dos Eucaliptos; Referee: Feliciano Lucas; Horácio Chissingui, Alexandre Bengue

Wed, 15 Jan 2020 PR	Rec da Caála	Walkover	Sporting Cabinda	Cabinda
15:00				Stadium: Tafe

Wed, 12 Feb 2020 PR	Jovens de Hoje	2–2 (3–4 p)	Sporting de Benguela	Luena
15:00	Soares 2'; Gorba 13'	Report	8', 36' Soares	Stadium: Mundunduleno; Referee: Paulo Sérgio; Segunda Tchissique, Ilídio Coimbra

== Round of 16 ==
Wed, 29 Jan 2020 R16	Académica Lobito	3–1	Progresso Sambizanga	Lobito
15:00	Adó Pena 7', 55'; Depaiza 49'		37' Sténio	Stadium: Buraco; Referee: Bernardo Nangolo; Rosário Calembela, António Pitra

Wed, 5 Feb 2020 R16	Progresso Sambizanga	1–0	Académica Lobito	Luanda
15:00	Filhão 48'			Stadium: Coqueiros; Referee: João Mavungo; Evaristo Baku, João Mbungo

Wed, 29 Jan 2020 R16	B. do Simulambuco	0–5	Interclube	Cabinda
15:00			8' Kadima; 12' (pen.) Dasfaa; 22' Pedy; Jaredi; 90' Carlinhos	Stadium: Tafe

Wed, 5 Feb 2020 R16	Interclube	Walkover	B. do Simulambuco	Luanda
16:00				Stadium: 22 de Junho

Wed, 29 Jan 2020 R16	Desportivo da Huíla	Walkover	Ferroviário do Huambo	Lubango
15:00				Stadium: Estádio do Ferrovia

Wed, 5 Feb 2020 R16	Ferroviário do Huambo	Walkover	Desportivo da Huíla	Huambo
15:00				Stadium: Estádio dos Kurikutelas

Wed, 29 Jan 2020 R16	J.A.S.	0–1	1º de Agosto	Saurimo
15:00		Report	35' (pen.) Lionel	Stadium: Mangueiras; Referee: Donaciano Mulumba; Alzandre Capola, Ilídio Baptista

Wed, 5 Feb 2020 R16	1º de Agosto	Walkover	J.A.S.	Luanda
15:00				Stadium: 11 de Novembro

Wed, 29 Jan 2020 R16	Rec da Caála	1–1	Bravos do Maquis	Caála
15:00	Makusa 58'	Report	29' Gazeta	Stadium: Mártires da Canhala; Referee: Benjamin Andrade; Bernabé Ngulo, Ricardo Daniel

Wed, 5 Feb 2020 R16	Bravos do Maquis	2–0	Rec da Caála	Luena
15:00	Wiwí 39'; Da Banda 78'	Report		Stadium: Mundunduleno; Referee: Yuri de Melo; Adão da Silva, Cláudio Francisco

Wed, 5 Feb 2020 R16	Sagrada Esperança	1–1	Petro de Luanda	Dundo
15:00	Cachi 52'	Report	20' Megue	Stadium: Sagrada; Referee: António Dungula; Jerson Emiliano, Ivanildo Lopes

Wed, 12 Feb 2020 R16	Petro de Luanda	2–2	Sagrada Esperança	Luanda
15:00	Manguxi 48'; Tony 62'		45+1' Gaspar; 65' Lulas	Stadium: 11 de Novembro; Referee: Benjamin Andrade; Júlio Lemos, Joaquim da Rocha

Wed, 29 Jan 2020 R16	Sporting de Benguela	Walkover	Santa Rita de Cássia	Benguela
15:00				Stadium: Ombaka

Wed, 5 Feb 2020 R16	Santa Rita de Cássia	Walkover	Sporting de Benguela	Uíge
15:00				Stadium: 4 de Janeiro

Wed, 29 Jan 2020 R16	Wiliete SC	Walkover	Kabuscorp	Benguela
15:00				Stadium: Edelfride Costa

Wed, 5 Feb 2020 R16	Kabuscorp	Walkover	Wiliete SC	Luanda
15:00				Stadium: Coqueiros

== Quarter-finals ==
Wed, 19 Feb 2020 QF	1º de Agosto	1–0	Académica Lobito	Luanda
17:00	Mongo 28'	Report		Stadium: 11 de Novembro; Referee: Bernardo Nangolo; António Livongue, Pedro Alberto

Wed, 04 Mar 2020 QF	Académica Lobito	1–1	1º de Agosto	Lobito
15:00	Odilon 66'	Report	90+3' Bobo	Stadium: Buraco; Referee: João Goma; Jerson Emiliano, Wilson Ntyamba

Wed, 19 Feb 2020 QF	Desportivo da Huíla	0–1	Sagrada Esperança	Lubango
15:30		Report	5' Chico	Stadium: Estádio do Ferrovia; Referee: Nuno Eduardo; Manuel Benguela, Nilton Armando

Wed, 04 Mar 2020 QF	Sagrada Esperança	1–0	Desportivo da Huíla	Dundo
15:00	Lépua 37'			Stadium: Sagrada

Wed, 19 Feb 2020 QF	Wiliete SC	2–2	Bravos do Maquis	Benguela
16:00	Maria Pia 26'; Kaporal 84'	Report	60' Miro; 87' Fabrício	Stadium: Ombaka; Referee: Feliciano Lucas; Horácio Tchissingui, Alexandre Bengue

Wed, 04 Mar 2020 QF	Bravos do Maquis	1–0	Wiliete SC	Luena
15:00	Da Banda 72'	Report		Stadium: Mundunduleno; Referee: Hélder Martins; Evanildo Lopes, Evanildo Martins

Sun, 23 Feb 2020 QF	Sporting Benguela	0–2	Interclube	Benguela
15:00			52' Carlinhos; 56' Coxe	Stadium: Mundunduleno

Wed, 04 Mar 2020 QF	Interclube	3–0	Sporting Benguela	Luanda
16:00	Kadima 5'; Coxe 30'; Carlinhos 72'	Report		Stadium: 22 de Junho; Referee: Ailton CarmelinoLuís Mateus, Aldair Carmelino

== Semifinals ==
Wed, 18 Mar 2020 QF	1º de Agosto	1–0	Bravos do Maquis	Luanda
16:00	Mabululu 8'			Stadium: 11 de Novembro; Referee: Feliciano Lucas; Horácio Tchissingui, Alexandre Bengue

Wed, 08 Apr 2020 QF	Bravos do Maquis	Cancelled	1º de Agosto	Luena
15:00				Stadium: Mundunduleno

Wed, 18 Mar 2020 QF	Sagrada Esperança	3–1	Interclube	Dundo
15:00	Daddy 53'; Femi 71'; Chico 87'	Report	46' Dasfaa	Stadium: Sagrada; Referee: Bernardo Nangolo; Wilson Ntyamba, Judith Mestre

Wed, 08 Apr 2020 QF	Interclube	Cancelled	Sagrada Esperança	Luanda
15:30				Stadium: 22 de Junho; Referee: =

== See also ==
- 2019–20 Girabola
- 2019–20 Angola Super Cup
- 2019–20 CAF Confederation Cup
