= 2022–23 Girabola =

Girabola
- Season: 2022–23
- Champions: Petro de Luanda
- Relegated: Provincial stages
- Top goalscorer: Azulão (20 goals)

The 2022–23 Girabola was the 45th season of top-tier football in Angola. The season ran from 24 September 2022 until 21 May 2023.

The league comprised 16 teams, the bottom three of which were relegated to the 2023–24 Provincial stages.

The winner and runner-up qualified for the 2023–24 CAF Champions League qualifications round.

== League table ==
Pos	Team	Pld	W	D	L	GF	GA	GD	Pts	Qualification or relegation
1	Petro de Luanda (C)	28	22	3	3	61	16	+45	69	Qualification for Champions League
2	Primeiro de Agosto	28	19	4	5	40	17	+23	61	Qualification for Champions League
3	Sagrada Esperança	28	17	4	7	47	23	+24	55	Qualification for Confederation Cup
4	Wiliete SC	28	15	8	5	36	19	+17	53	
5	Interclube	28	14	8	6	39	21	+18	50	
6	Bravos do Maquis	28	10	9	9	35	25	+10	39	
7	Santa Rita de Cássia	28	9	9	10	20	28	−8	36	
8	Académica do Lobito	28	9	8	11	29	35	−6	35	
9	Recreativo do Libolo	28	8	10	10	29	34	−5	34	
10	Desportivo da Huíla	28	8	9	11	29	26	+3	33	
11	Desportivo da Lunda Sul	28	8	7	13	25	32	−7	31	
12	Sporting de Cabinda	28	7	5	16	17	44	−27	26	
13	Isaac de Benguela	28	5	7	16	18	36	−18	22	
14	Sporting de Benguela	28	5	5	18	18	52	−34	20	Relegation to Provincial stages
15	ASK Dragão	28	1	10	17	13	48	−35	13	Relegation to Provincial stages
16	Cuando Cubango FC (D)	0	0	0	0	0	0	0	0	Relegation to Provincial stages

Updated to match(es) played on May 21 2023. Source: Girabola.com Girabola, SOCCERWAY
Rules for classification: 1) Points; 2) Head-to-head points; 3) Goal difference; 4) Head-to-head goal difference; 5) Goals scored; 6) Fair-play points; 7) Play-off.
(C) Champions; (D) Disqualified

== Results ==
Home \ Away	ACA	ASK	BMQ	DHL	DLS	INT	ISA	PET	PRI	RLB	SAG	SBE	SCC	SRC	WIL
Académica do Lobito	—	2–0	2–2	2–1	3–2	0–0	2–2	0–2	1–0	1–1	1–0	3–1	3–0 (Note: Académica do Lobito was awarded a 3–0 win)	2–0	0–1
ASK Dragão	0–0	—	0–0	1–1	2–2	1–3	0–0	0–1	0–1	0–1	0–0	0–0	2–0	0–1	0–1
Bravos do Maquis	3–0	3–0 (Note: Bravos do Maquis was awarded a 3–0 win)	—	2–0	3–1	1–1	3–0	1–1	0–1	1–1	0–0	1–0	4–1	0–1	2–1
Desportivo da Huíla	3–0	6–1	0–0	—	4–1	0–0	0–0	1–2	1–2	1–1	0–1	1–0	2–1	2–0	1–0
Desportivo da Lunda Sul	1–0	1–0	0–1	1–1	—	1–2	0–1	1–2	0–1	2–1	1–1	2–0	2–0	1–0	0–0
Interclube	5–1	2–2	1–0	0–0	2–0	—	3–2	0–2	1–0	3–0	2–0	2–0	5–1	0–1	2–1
Isaac de Benguela	1–1	1–0	1–0	0–1	0–1	0–1	—	0–5	0–2	0–0	1–2	0–1	0–1	2–0	0–0
Petro de Luanda	2–0	6–0	2–0	1–0	1–1	2–1	1–0	—	0–1	0–1	2–1	7–1	2–0	3–0	1–1
Primeiro de Agosto	1–1	3–0	2–1	2–0	0–0	1–1	3–2	2–1	—	2–1	2–0	2–1	1–0	1–0	0–0
Recreativo do Libolo	0–2	2–0	0–0	1–1	0–1	2–1	2–1	1–2	1–3	—	1–0	0–0	2–1	1–1	0–1
Sagrada Esperança	2–0	5–1	3–2	1–0	3–2	1–0	2–1	1–2	2–0	4–2	—	4–0	3–0	3–0	1–2
Sporting de Benguela	1–0	1–1	3–2	2–1	1–1	0–1	2–1	1–2	1–5	0–3	0–2	—	0–1	0–0	1–3
Sporting de Cabinda	1–0	0–0	1–2	2–0	1–0	0–0	0–2	0–4	0–2	1–1	0–3	1–0	—	1–0	1–2
Santa Rita de Cássia	1–1	2–1	1–1	1–1	1–0	0–0	3–0	0–3	1–0	2–2	0–1	1–0	1–1	—	1–1
Wiliete SC	2–1	3–1	1–0	1–0	1–0	2–0	0–0	1–2	1–0	3–1	1–1	5–1	1–1	0–1	—

Updated to match(es) played on 21 May 2023. Source: girabola.com
Legend: Blue = home team win; Yellow = draw; Red = away team win.

== Statistics ==
=== Scorers ===
R/T
R/T	ACA	ASK	BMQ	DHL	DLS	INT	ISA	PET	PRI	RLB	SAG	SBE	SCC	SRC	WIL	TOTAL
1								27/9/22		24/9/22	24/9/22		24/9/22		24/9/22	7
1								PET–BMQ 2–0; Azulão 55' 60'		RLB–ASK 1–0; Isaías 87'	SAG–WIL 1–2; Luís Tati 19'		SCC–DLS 1–0; Jú Cabral 2' pen.		SAG–WIL 1–2; Naigel 23'; Mona 62'	7
2				1/10/22	1/10/22	1/10/22		2/10/22	2/10/22	1/10/22						10
2				RLB–DHL 1–1; Mimitcha 90+2'	DLS–SBE 2–0; Jaime 38'; Joca 70'	INT–SAG 2–0; Jamanta 45+2'; Mano Calesso 87'		SRC–PET 0–3; Azulão 41' 68'; Jaredi 53'	BMQ–PRI 0–1; Jiresse 4'	RLB–DHL 1–1; Caneta 45' pen.						10
3	9/10/22		9/10/22		9/11/22			9/11/22	21/12/22				8/10/22		9/10/22	11
3	ACA–BMQ 2–2; Kaporal 33' pen. Telmo 60'		ACA–BMQ 2–2; Chico 38'; Cuca 44'		PET–DLS 1–1; Jaime 15'			PET–DLS 1–1; Gilberto 56'	PRI–SRC 1–0; Dago 32'				SCC–DHL 2–0; Coxito 29'; Bolax 80'		WIL–INT 2–0; Ning 32'; Kibeixa 45+4' pen.	11
4	15/10/22			16/10/22		15/10/22	15/10/22	18/10/22	1/2/23	15/10/22			15/10/22			13
4	ACA–SRC 2–0; Kaporal 6' pen. Benvindo 23'			DHL–SBE 1–0; Malamba 32'		INT–ISA 3–2; Danilson 3' 50'; Mano Calesso 11'	INT–ISA 3–2; Sabino 35'; Quinho 87'	ASK–PET 0–1; Azulão 37'	DLS–PRI 0–1; Liliano 31'	RLB–SCC 2–1; Lúcio 48' o.g. Barreiro 65'			RLB–SCC 2–1; Zeca 77' pen.			13
5					23/10/22			23/10/22	23/10/22		23/10/22		22/10/22		23/10/22	8
5					DLS–ACA 1–0; Cláudio 75'			PET–DHL 1–0; Azulão 16'	ASK–PRI 0–1; Isaac 52'		SAG–SRC 3–0; Matengó 5'; Deco 53'; Cachi 85'		ISA–SCC 0–1; Zeca 67'		WIL–BMQ 1–0; Ning 32'	8
6	29/10/22		29/10/22	8/12/22	29/10/22	29/10/22			8/12/22	28/10/22	29/10/22		30/10/22	30/10/22	30/10/22	13
6	ACA–ASK 2–0; Kaporal 18' 65'		BMQ–INT 1–1; Rúben 35'	DHL–PRI 1–2; Adó Pena 88'	DLS–SAG 1–1; João Joca 74'	BMQ–INT 1–1; Mano C. 49' pen.			DHL–PRI 1–2; Bobo 2'; Dago 12'	PET–RLB 0–1; Isaías 79'	DLS–SAG 1–1; Deco 2'		SBE–SCC 0–1; Hanilton 82'	SRC–WIL 1–1; Beny 25'	SRC–WIL 1–1; Neide 86'	13
7				6/11/22				5/11/22	31/12/22	31/12/22		5/11/22		5/11/22	6/11/22	13
7				DHL–ACA 3–0; Nandinho 6'; Tchutchu 59'; Rupson 89'				SCC–PET 0–4; Yano 45+2'; Jaredi 64'; Azulão 73' 87'	PRI–RLB 2–1; Melono 30'; Silva 47'	PRI–RLB 2–1; Andeloy 48'		ISA–SBE 0–1; Betinho 46'		INT–SRC 0–1; Gui 19' pen.	WIL–DLS 1–0; Nelito 30'	13
8	12/11/22	12/11/22	12/11/22			12/11/22		12/11/22	12/11/22		12/11/22	12/11/22			12/11/22	17
8	RLB–ACA 0–2; Kaporal 37' 74'	WIL–ASK 3–1; Adilson 25'	BMQ–ISA 3–0; Maranata 47'; Da Banda 70' 77'			INT–DLS 2–0; Buba 35'; Julinho 77'		SBE–PET 1–2; Gilberto 70' 88'	SCC–PRI 0–2; César Cangue 51'; Jiresse 78'		SAG–DHL 1–0; Lépua 44'	SBE–PET 1–2; Betinho 26' pen.			WIL–ASK 3–1; Mona 42'; Nelito 55'; Ning 63'	17
9		23/11/22		21/11/22		23/11/22	25/11/22	25/11/22	24/11/22	24/11/22	24/11/22	24/11/22		23/11/22		17
9		ASK–INT 1–3; Pedro 62'		DHL–WIL 1–0; Adó Pena 47'		ASK–INT 1–3; Julinho 30' 37' 45+1'	ISA–PET 0–5	ISA–PET 0–5; Eddie 37'; Gleison 53' 72'; Depú 55'; Gilberto 87'	PRI–SBE 2–1; César Cangue 37'; Melono 90+7'	SAG–RLB 4–2; Viet 21'; Filipe 90+4'	SAG–RLB 4–2; Celso 12'; Cachi 61' pen. Jefer Gunjo 81'; Deco 90+1'	PRI–SBE 2–1; Cebola 14'		BMQ–SRC 0–1; Zinho 45+1'		17
10			28/11/22						29/11/22		28/11/22	27/11/22		27/11/22	28/11/22	10
10			DLS–BMQ 0–1; Rúben 30'						PET–PRI 0–1; Bito 90+7'		SCC–SAG 0–3; Lépua 25'; Latif 83' 86'	SBE–ACA 1–0; Betinho 21'		SRC–ISA 3–0; Agoya 12'; Lucas 61'; Beny 78'	RLB–WIL 0–1; Naigel 79'	10
11						3/12/22	4/12/22	3/12/22	4/12/22		4/12/22		4/12/22	4/12/22	4/12/22	14
11						INT–RLB 3–0; Filipe 10' o.g. Jó Paciência 30'; Julinho 90'	PRI–ISA 3–2; Quinho 40'; Patrício 78'	ACA–PET 0–2; Azulão 75' 85' pen.	PRI–ISA 3–2; Dagó 32' 57' 90' pen.		SAG–SBE 4–0; Deco 3'; Celso 45'; Jefer Gunjo 69'; Jorge 90+3'		WIL–SCC 1–1; Valoy 30'	SRC–DLS 1–0; Fofó 81'	WIL–SCC 1–1; Naigel 45+1'	14
12	12/12/22						10/12/22	10/12/22	12/12/22		10/12/22	11/12/22		11/12/22	11/12/22	11
12	PRI–ACA 1–1; Kaporal 78'						DLS–ISA 0–1; Patrício 48' pen.	PET–SAG 2–1; Carlinhos 46'; Gilberto 77'	PRI–ACA 1–1; Dagó 70'		PET–SAG 2–1; Dasfaa 28' pen.	SBE–WIL 1–3; Álvaro 53'		ASK–SRC 0–1; Rabbi 83'	SBE–WIL 1–3; Ning 15' 19'; Kibeixa 77'	11
13	17/12/22		17/12/22	18/12/22	18/12/22	17/12/22	17/12/22	17/12/22		17/12/22	17/12/22			18/12/22	17/12/22	14
13	ISA–ACA 1–1; Kaporal 83'		BMQ–RLB 1–1; Chico Bunga 10'	SRC–DHL 1–1; Nandinho 78'	DLS–ASK 1–0; Yuri 58'	INT–SBE 2–0; Buba 47' 58'	ISA–ACA 1–1; Geraldo 38'	WIL–PET 1–2; Azulão 45+1'; Quinito 70'		BMQ–RLB 1–1; Andeloy 8'	SAG–PRI 2–0; Cachi 79'; Celso 80'			SRC–DHL 1–1; Lucas 33'	WIL–PET 1–2; Panilson 9'	14
14	22/12/22		22/12/22	22/12/22	22/12/22	2/11/22		2/11/22		24/12/22			22/12/22	24/12/22		11
14	ACA–SAG 1–0; Kaporal 40'		SCC–BMQ 1–2; Vadinho 70'; Lara 90+2'	DLS–DHL 1–1; Lionel 15'	DLS–DHL 1–1; Filipe 58'	PET–INT 2–1; Calebi 42'		PET–INT 2–1; Depú 74'; Azulão 83'		RLB–SRC 1–1; Emerson 87'			SCC–BMQ 1–2; Valoy 7' pen.	RLB–SRC 1–1; Beny 65'		11
15	7/12/22	29/12/22	7/12/22	29/12/22	14/12/22	28/12/22	21/11/22				21/11/22		29/12/22	29/12/22	7/12/22	18
15	WIL–ACA 2–1; Geovane 90+7'	DHL–ASK 6–1; Galaxy 27'	BMQ–SBE 1–0; Da Banda 17'	DHL–ASK 6–1; Rupson 5' 8'; Nandinho 33'; Adó Pena 87'; Mendes 89' 90+2'	RLB–DLS 0–1; Filipe 58'	INT–PRI 1–0; Julinho 67'	SAG–ISA 2–1; Edilson 52'				SAG–ISA 2–1; Lépua 4'; Cachi 90+4'		SRC–SCC 1–1; Coxito 17' pen.	SRC–SCC 1–1; Gui Tomás 39'	WIL–ACA 2–1; Kibeixa 17'; Naigel 67'	18
16	4/2/23		5/2/23	4/2/23	21/3/23	4/2/23		5/2/23		4/2/23	5/2/23			5/2/23	5/2/23	16
16	INT–ACA 5–1; Kaporal 21'		BMQ–PET 1–1; Faia 10'	ISA–DHL 1–0; Adó Pena 5'	DLS–SCC 2–0; Magrinho 50'; Mussa 90+3'	INT–ACA 5–1; Calebi 19'; Paty 54'; Nilton 58'; Julinho 67'; Buba 72'		BMQ–PET 1–1; Yano 41'		RLB–ASK 0–2; Gancha 15'; Isaac 90'	WIL–SAG 1–1; Joca 59'			SRC–SBE 1–0; Cedric 22'	WIL–SAG 1–1; Cláudio 90+2' pen.	16
17		3/5/23	8/2/23	8/2/23	8/2/23			14/2/23	8/2/23	8/2/23	8/2/23	8/2/23				13
17		ASK–SCC 2–0; Picas 32' 52'	PRI–BMQ 2–1; Chico 49' pen.	DHL–RLB 1–1; Bruno Raúl 18'	SBE–DLS 1–1; Magrinho 90+4'			PET–SRC 3–0; Gleison 4'; Yano 28'; Emanuel 35' o.g.	PRI–BMQ 2–1; Venâncio 15'; Liliano 22'	DHL–RLB 1–1; Caneta 23'	SAG–INT 1–0; Valter 17'	SBE–DLS 1–1; Valente 49' pen.				13
18		12/2/23	25/3/23	12/2/23	1/3/23	12/2/23	12/2/23	1/3/23		12/2/23		12/2/23	12/2/23	11/2/23	12/2/23	18
18		SBE–ASK 1–1; Picas 30'	BMQ–ACA 3–0; Jorginho 37'; Bernardo 42'; Chonene 88'	DHL–SCC 2–1; Lionel 55' pen. Mendes 80'	DLS–PET 1–2; Betinho 6'	INT–WIL 2–1; Julinho 68'; Buba 83'	RLB–ISA 2–1; Patrício 65' pen.	DLS–PET 1–2; Azulão 74'; Pedro Pinto 90+1'		RLB–ISA 2–1; Barreiro 21'; Viet 72'		SBE–ASK 1–1; Cebola 45+2'	DHL–SCC 2–1; Beni 90'	SRC–PRI 1–0; Beny Papel 22'	INT–WIL 2–1; Naigel 65'	18
19	19/2/23		18/2/23	19/2/23		20/2/23		5/4/23		18/2/23	18/2/23	19/2/23	18/2/23	19/2/23		19
19	SRC–ACA 1–1; Kaporal 36'		SAG–BMQ 3–2; Edmilson 16'; Nguevito 73'	SBE–DHL 2–1; Freddy 45+1'		ISA–INT 0–1; Lito 45'		PET–ASK 6–0; Megue 2'; Yano 17'; Anderson 20'; Gleison 37'; Carlinhos 72'; Gilberto 87'		SCC–RLB 1–1; Barreiro 54' pen.	SAG–BMQ 3–2; Deco 66'; Sargento 76' o.g. Celso 80'	SBE–DHL 2–1; Cebola 28' pen. Selimani 45+5'	SCC–RLB 1–1; Malamba 20'	SRC–ACA 1–1; Gui Tomás 45+1'		19
20	12/2/23		25/2/23	10/5/23	12/2/23		26/2/23	10/5/23	26/2/23	26/2/23	26/2/23				25/2/23	
20	ACA–DLS 3–2; Kaporal 16'; Edú Pessela 25'; Valdez 44'		BMQ–WIL 2–1; Rúben 19'; Edmilson 89'	DHL–PET 1–2; Quinito 79' o.g.	ACA–DLS 3–2; Magrinho 49'; Betinho 87'		SCC–ISA 0–2; Coelhinho 3'; João Vala 48'	DHL–PET 1–2; Gleison 53'; Megue 77'	PRI–ASK 3–0; Tombé 51' 90'; Vingumba 64'	SBE–RLB 0–3; Gancha 55' 58'; Caneta 86'	SRC–SAG 0–1; Jefer Gunjo 90'				BMQ–WIL 2–1; Panilson 90+1'	
21					4/3/23	4/3/23		5/3/23	5/3/23	5/3/23	4/3/23		5/3/23	5/3/23		13
21					SAG–DLS 3–2; Betinho 35'; Balacai 81'	INT–BMQ 1–0; Buba 20'		RLB–PET 1–2; Jaredi 38'; Azulão 46'	PRI–DHL 2–0; Keliano 34'; Dago 36'	RLB–PET 1–2; Andeloy 90+1'	SAG–DLS 3–2; Lau King 55'; Celso 62'; Valter 79'		SCC–SBE 1–0; Carlos Barulho 58'	WIL–SRC 0–1; Gui Tomás 57'		13
22	11/3/23	12/3/23		11/3/23			11/3/23	20/4/23	11/3/23	11/3/23	12/3/23	11/3/23				17
22	ACA–DHL 2–1; Paizinho 61'; Jó Simões 90+2'	SAG–ASK 5–1; Picas 40'		ACA–DHL 2–1; Manico 22'			SBE–ISA 2–1; Manusele '	PET–SCC 2–0; Gilberto 4' 89'	RLB–PRI 1–3; Dagó 40' 54'; Tombe 63'	RLB–PRI 1–3; Barreiro 90+1' pen.	SAG–ASK 5–1; Joca 4' 26; Cachi 15' 45'; Deco 72' pen.	SBE–ISA 2–1; Cebola '				17
23	2/4/23				1/4/23	1/4/23	1/4/23	24/3/23	2/4/23	2/4/23	2/4/23	24/3/23			2/4/23	17
23	ACA–RLB 1–1; Kaporal 68'				DLS–INT 1–2; Betinho 36'	DLS–INT 1–2; Julinho 2'; Higino 54'	ISA–BMQ 1–0; Mule 43'	PET–SBE 7–1; Pedro Pinto 4'; Azulão 13' 44' pen. 76' pen. Yano 20' 50'; Caranga 81'	PRI–SCC 1–0; Bobo 75'	ACA–RLB 1–1; Francis 36'	DHL–SAG 0–1; Lépua 49'	PET–SBE 7–1; Valente 35'			ASK–WIL 0–1; Simão 27'	17
24		8/4/23	9/4/23			8/4/23		8/4/23	8/4/23	8/4/23		8/4/23	8/4/23	9/4/23	9/4/23	16
24		INT–ASK 2–2; Ary Chato 15'; Picas 26'	SRC–BMQ 1–1; Lara 27'			INT–ASK 2–2; Jó Paciência 33'; Julinho 73'		PET–ISA 1–0; Azulão 42'	SBE–PRI 1–5; Vingumba 27'; Hossi 43'; Dagó 60' 90+5'; Asumani 77'	RLB–SAG 1–0; Andeloy 41'		SBE–PRI 1–5; Valente 78'	SCC–ACA 1–0; Fuka 30'	SRC–BMQ 1–1; Sebas 90+2'	WIL–DHL 1–0; Apado 3'	16
25	16/4/23		16/4/23		16/4/23		16/4/23	16/4/23	16/4/23	16/4/23		16/4/23	17/4/23		16/4/23	20
25	ACA–SBE 3–1; Sequesseque 49'; Kaporal 54'; Márcio 65'		BMQ–DLS 3–1; Jorginho 52' 54' 79'		BMQ–DLS 3–1; Mussa 90+4'		ISA–SRC 2–0; João Vala 60'; Quinho 69'	PRI–PET 2–1; Soares 40'	PRI–PET 2–1; Keliano 14'; César Cangue 73'	WIL–RLB 3–1; Caneta 8'		ACA–SBE 3–1; Valente 89'	SAG–SCC 3–0; Celso 9'; Lépua 61'; Lau King 90'	WIL–RLB 3–1; Filipe 48'; Apado 55'; Naigel 90+4'		20
26					22/4/23	22/4/23		23/4/23	22/4/23	22/4/23	22/4/23		22/4/23		22/4/23	13
26					DLS–SRC 1–0; Betinho 79'	RLB–INT 2–1; Julinho 63'		PET–ACA 2–0; Jaredi 33'; Gilberto 41'	ISA–PRI 0–2; Juze 2' o.g. Moisés 66'	RLB–INT 2–1; Viet 7'; Barreiro 65'	SBE–SAG 0–2; Lau King 38'; Deco 90+5'		SCC–WIL 1–2; Simão 27' o.g.		SCC–WIL 1–2; Ning 12' 62'	13
27	29/4/23	30/4/23	29/4/23		29/4/23	29/4/23		29/4/23			29/4/23	30/4/23	29/4/23	30/4/23	30/4/23	22
27	ACA–PRI 1–0; Kaporal 16'	SRC–ASK 2–1; Laton 83'	BMQ–DHL 2–0; Jorginho 28' pen. Chico 90' pen.		ISA–DLS 0–1; Magrinho 12'	INT–SCC 5–1; Julinho 5' 90+3'; Paty 15'; Mano C. 77' 82'		SAG–PET 1–2; Jaredi 35'; Gilberto 45+3'			SAG–PET 1–2; Lulas 90+2'	WIL–SBE 5–1; Valente 27'	INT–SCC 5–1; Fuka 47'	SRC–ASK 2–1; Gui Tomás 31'; Beny Papel 51'	WIL–SBE 5–1; Apado 6'; Nelito 19'; Naigel 40'; Cláudio Sozinho 72'; Kibeixa 90'	22
28	6/5/23	7/5/23		7/5/23	7/5/23	7/5/23	6/5/23	6/5/23	7/5/23						6/5/23	15
28	ACA–ISA 2–2; Paizinho 70' 90+7'	ASK–DLS 2–2; Bebo 7' o.g. Moisés 30'		DHL–SRC 2–0; Lionel Yombi 16'; Nandinho 22'	ASK–DLS 2–2; Balacai 48' 73'	SBE–INT 0–1; Mano Calesso 5'	ACA–ISA 2–2; Quinho 67' 86'	PET–WIL 1–1; Gilberto 50'	PRI–SAG 2–0; Dagó 78'; Catraio 89'						PET–WIL 1–1; Nelito 12'	15
29			14/5/23	14/5/23	14/5/23		14/5/23	14/5/23		14/5/23	14/5/23		14/5/23	14/5/23	14/5/23	20
29			BMQ–SCC 4–1; Luís Escovalo 2'; Sargento 45+2'; Chole 75' 80'	DHL–DLS 4–1; Lionel 6' pen. 33' 45' pen. Ginebe 18'	DHL–DLS 4–1; Balacai 35'		ISA–ASK 1–0; João Vala 71' pen.	INT–PET 0–2; Quinito 14'; Azulão 55' pen.		SRC–RLB 2–2; Caneta 63'; Barreiro 90+3'	SAG–ACA 2–0; Lépua 31'; Jefer 85' pen.		BMQ–SCC 4–1; Bruno 22'	SRC–RLB 2–2; Mafuta 90'; Lucas 90+6'	WIL–PRI 1–0; Nelito 43'	20
30		22/5/23	21/5/23	21/5/23	22/5/23	21/5/23	21/5/23		21/5/23	21/5/23	21/5/23	21/5/23	21/5/23		21/5/23	17
30		ASK–DHL 1–1; Picas 81' pen.	SBE–BMQ 3–2; Gogoró 26'; Cuca 72' pen.	ASK–DHL 1–1; Rupson 29'	DLS–RLB 2–1; Balacai 3' 16'	PRI–INT 1–1; Nilton 46'	ISA–SAG 1–2; Quinho 62'		PRI–INT 1–1; Vingumba 2'	DLS–RLB 2–1; Caneta 82'	ISA–SAG 1–2; Victoriano 57' pen. Luís Tati 78'	SBE–BMQ 3–2; Fred 7' o.g. Russinho 55' pen. Jelson 90+5'	SCC–SRC 1–0; Chinote 54'		ACA–WIL 0–1; Apado 65'	17
T	26	13	32	29	25	39	18	61	40	29	47	18	17	20	36	450

=== Top scorers ===
As of 1 May 2023

=== Hat-tricks ===
As of 1 May 2023

== Stadiums ==
Team	Location	Stadium	Capacity
Académica do Lobito	Lobito	Estádio do Buraco	5,000
ASK Dragão	Luanda	Estádio 4 de Janeiro	4,000
Bravos do Maquis	Luena	Estádio Mundunduleno	4,300
Cuando Cubango FC	Cuíto	Estádio dos Eucaliptos	4,000
Desportivo da Huíla	Lubango	Estádio do Ferroviário da Huíla	15,000
Desportivo da Lunda Sul	Saurimo	Estádio das Mangueiras	7,000
Interclube	Luanda	Estádio 22 de Junho	8,000
Isaac de Benguela	Benguela	Estádio Municipal de Benguela	5,000
Petro de Luanda	Talatona	Estádio 22 de Junho	8,000
Primeiro de Agosto	Luanda	Estádio 22 de Junho	8,000
Recreativo do Libolo	Calulo	Estádio Municipal de Calulo	5,000
Sagrada Esperança	Dundo	Estádio Sagrada Esperança	8,000
Santa Rita de Cássia	Luanda	Estádio 4 de Janeiro	4,000
Sporting de Benguela	Benguela	Estádio Municipal de Benguela	5,000
Sporting de Cabinda	Tafe	Estádio Municipal do Tafe	5,000
Wiliete SC	Benguela	Estádio Nacional de Ombaka	35,000
