= List of Sporting Clube de Cabinda players =

This is a list of Sporting Clube de Cabinda players. Sporting de Cabinda is an Angolan football (soccer) club based in Cabinda, in the namesake province of Angola and plays at the Estádio Municipal do Tafe. The club was established in the year 1975.

== 2020-2021 ==
| Nat | # | Nick | Name | A | P | D.K. | Total Apps & Gls | | |
| Nat | # | Nick | Name | A | P | 2021 | Total Apps & Gls | | |
| Nat | # | Nick | Name | A | P | ^{C} | ^{S} | ^{A} | ^{G} |
|---|---|---|---|---|---|---|---|---|---|
| (Angola) | 23 | Bebucho | | | | 2021 | | | |
| (Angola) | 18 | Calei | José Futi Puna | 25 | | 2021 | | | |
| (Angola) | 10 | Castro | Manuel de Castro Masiala Cuambi | 34 | MF | 2021 | | | |
| (Angola) | 3 | Coca-Cola | Faustino Jorge Gonçalves | 26 | DF | 2021 | | | |
| (Angola) | 6 | Cristo | Míria Cristo Draleco | 31 | DF | 2021 | | | |
| (Angola) | 5 | Dudú | Domingos Monteiro Jack | 35 | DF | 2021 | | | |
| (Angola) | 11 | Fuka | João Bivoba Zau | 26 | MF | 2021 | | | |
| (Angola) | 17 | G.T.I. | Daniel António Jonata | 24 | MF | 2021 | | | |
| (Angola) | 28 | Gláucio Bicuila | Gláucio Victor Bicuila | 31 | FW | 2021 | | | |
| (Angola) | 13 | Gláucio Saiombe | Jacinto Tembo Saiombe | 28 | FW | 2021 | | | |
| (Angola) | 16 | Isaías | Isaías José Agostinho | 28 | MF | 2021 | | | |
| (Angola) | 1 | Josué | João Eduardo Bunga | 21 | GK | 2021 | | | |
| (Angola) | 8 | Lazi | Lázaro Francisco da Rocha | 22 | MF | 2021 | | | |
| (Angola) | 12 | Leo | Leonilde Gongo Zamba | 31 | GK | 2021 | | | |
| (Angola) | 24 | Leonel | | | MF | 2021 | | | |
| (Angola) | 27 | Luís Soares | | | | 2021 | | | |
| (Angola) | 15 | Lutumba | Eduardo Lutumba | | | 2021 | | | |
| (Angola) | 29 | Mitó | | | | 2021 | | | |
| (Angola) | 2 | Nani | Sebastião Quionga Luvualo | | DF | 2021 | | | |
| (Angola) | 9 | Shoma | António Pedro Costa | 24 | FW | 2021 | | | |
| (Angola) | 30 | Tchingane | Frederico Baioca M. Zau | | DF | 2021 | | | |
| (Angola) | 26 | Tino | Celestino Calueio Cassinda | | | 2021 | | | |
| (Angola) | 14 | Valoy | | | | 2021 | | | |
| (Angola) | 21 | Venâncio | Venâncio Landu Kukula | 26 | MF | 2021 | | | |
| (Angola) | 7 | Yele | Gabriel João Manuel | 27 | MF | 2021 | | | |
| (Angola) | 4 | Yuri | Roberto Yuri Lutanda | 27 | MF | 2021 | | | |
| Years | | | | | | 2021 | | | |

== 2011-2020 ==
| Nat | Nick | Name | A | P | – | A.C. | A. César | | M.L. | Daniel Emena Kwazambi | | | | | | | | | | | Total Apps & Gls | | | |
| Nat | Nick | Name | A | P | 2011 | 2012 | 2013 | 2014 | 2015 | 2016 | 2017 | 2018 (10th) | | | 2018–19 (13th) | | | 2019–20 | | | Total Apps & Gls | | | |
| Nat | Nick | Name | A | P | 1 | 15 | 1 | 12 | 15 | 2 | 2 | ^{#} | ^{A} | ^{G} | ^{#} | ^{A} | ^{G} | ^{#} | ^{A} | ^{G} | ^{S} | ^{A} | ^{G} | |
|---|---|---|---|---|---|---|---|---|---|---|---|---|---|---|---|---|---|---|---|---|---|---|---|---|
| (Angola) | Abel Lukango | Abel Muamba | 25 | FW | | | | | | | → | 25 | ^{3(2)} | | | | | | | | | | | |
| (Republic of the Congo) | Abó | Arthur Ngoulou-Yakali Bienven | 37 | MF | | 2012 | | | | | | | | | | | | | | | | | | |
| (Angola) | Addy | | | GK | | 2012 | | | | | | | | | | | | | | | | | | |
| (Angola) | Água Doce | José Fernandes Mbuta | | MF | | | | | | | → | 21 | ^{10} | ^{0} | | | | | | | | | | |
| (Brazil) | Alexandre Ignácio | Alexandre Ignácio | | MF | | | | 23 | | | – | | | | | | | | | | | | | |
| (Angola) | Ângelo | | | | | | | | | 2016 | | | | | | | | | | | | | | |
| (Angola) | Anselmo Samuzeca | Anselmo Bernardo C. Samuzeca | 22 | GK | | | | | | | | | | | → | | | 22 | ^{1} | ^{0} | | | | |
| (Angola) | Aspirina | Manuel António Pinto Cambila | 29 | GK | | | | – | → | | | | | | | | | | | | | | | |
| (Angola) | Azé | | | | | | | | | 2016 | | | | | | | | | | | | | | |
| (Angola) | Bató | | | | | | | | | 2016 | | | | | | | | | | | | | | |
| (Angola) | Bebucho Henriques | Márcio Sakuala Ramalho Henriques | 26 | MF | | | | | | → | 17 | 17 | ^{(6)} | ^{1} | 17 | ^{3(9)} | ^{0} | | | | | | | |
| (Angola) | Binda | | | | | 2012 | | | | | | | | | | | | | | | | | | |
| (Angola) | Bobó Fernando | Egaz Domingos Simba Fernando | | DF | 2011 | 2012 | | 4 | 4 | | | | | | | | | | | | | | | |
| (Angola) | Borges | | | | | 2012 | | | | | | | | | | | | | | | | | | |
| (Angola) | Bug Jass | Simão da Costa Bartolomeu | 29 | MF | | | | | | | | | | | → | | | 4 | ^{8(3)} | ^{2} | | | | |
| (Angola) | Bukasa | Patricio Bukasa Wabukasa | | MF | | | | 17 | | | | | | | | | | | | | | | | |
| (Angola) | Cacumba | Manuel Eduardo Singe | | | | 2012 | | | | | | | | | | | | | | | | | | |
| (Angola) | Calei | José Futi Puna | 24 | | | | | | | | | | | | 18 | ^{17(2)} | ^{0} | 18 | ^{1(1)} | ^{0} | | | | |
| (Angola) | Camota | Júlio Camota Marcelino Tito | 22 | MF | | | | | | | → | – | ^{(1)} | ^{0} | | | | | | | | | | |
| (Angola) | Capita | Evanildo de Jesus Pedro | 31 | FW | | | | | | | | | | | 17 | ^{7(4)} | ^{1} | 16 | ^{1(4)} | ^{0} | | | | |
| (Angola) | Careca | Nanizawo Jacques António | 31 | DF | | | | | | | | | | | → | | | 23 | ^{1(2)} | ^{0} | | | | |
| (Angola) | Castro Cuambi | Manuel de Castro Masiala Cuambi | 33 | MF | | | | | | | 16 | 10 | ^{15(1)} | ^{4} | 10 | ^{22} | ^{4} | 10 | ^{2(3)} | ^{1} | | | | |
| (Angola) | Caxito | | | GK | | | | | – | 2016 | | | | | | | | | | | | | | |
| (Angola) | Chico Cambo | João F.S. Cambo | | | | | | | | | | | | | 25 | ^{1(5)} | ^{0} | | | | | | | |
| (Angola) | Cisse | | | | | | | | | 2016 | | | | | | | | | | | | | | |
| (Angola) | Cristo | Míria Cristo Draleco | 30 | DF | | 2012 | | 6 | 6 | 2016 | – | 6 | ^{4(7)} | ^{0} | 6 | ^{27} | ^{0} | 6 | ^{4} | ^{0} | | | | |
| (Angola) | Dadão Pedro | Manuel Nzagi Pedro | 23 | GK | | | | → | 22 | → | | | | | | | | | | | | | | |
| (Angola) | Diogo | | | | | | | | – | | | | | | | | | | | | | | | |
| (Angola) | Djemba Bunga | Gildo Paulo Bunga | | | → | 2012 | | | | | 7 | | | | | | | | | | | | | |
| (Angola) | Djemba Djemba | Afonso Marcos Kiala | | | → | 2012 | | | | | | | | | | | | | | | | | | |
| (Angola) | Dudú Jack | Domingos Monteiro Jack | 34 | DF | | | | | | | | | | | → | | | 5 | ^{15} | ^{0} | | | | |
| (Angola) | Edson Praia | Edson da Graça Calunga Praia | 31 | DF | | | | | | | | → | | | 3 | ^{2} | ^{0} | | | | | | | |
| (Angola) | Evandro Silva | Evandro César Namboca da Silva | | FW | | | | 11 | | | | | | | | | | | | | | | | |
| (Angola) | Faustino Gonçalves | Faustino Jorge Gonçalves | 25 | DF | | | | | | | | | | | 29 | ^{3} | ^{0} | 3 | ^{11} | ^{0} | | | | |
| (Angola) | Filhão | João Gomes de Oliveira | 20 | FW | | | | | 11 | → | | | | | | | | | | | | | | |
| (Angola) | Fiston Bicuila | Francisco Banganga Bicuila | | | | 2012 | | | | | | | | | | | | | | | | | | |
| (Angola) | Foguinho | Júlio Samucuenje Baptista | 25 | FW | | | | | | | | | | | → | | | 24 | ^{14(2)} | ^{3} | | | | → |
| (Angola) | Frank Jimbi | Francisco Barros Jimbi | 24 | MF | | | | | | | | 19 | ^{6(3)} | ^{0} | 24 | ^{3(4)} | ^{0} | 19 | ^{2(2)} | ^{0} | | | | |
| (Angola) | Fuka | João Bivoba Zau | 25 | MF | | | | | | | – | 11 | ^{13(3)} | ^{1} | 11 | ^{14(9)} | ^{1} | 11 | ^{2(2)} | ^{0} | | | | |
| (Angola) | Fundo † | Fundo Martins Milukiele | 24 | FW | | | | | | | | → | | | 27 | ^{23(1)} | ^{6} | | | | | | | |
| (Angola) | G.T.I. | Daniel António Jonata | 23 | MF | | | | | | | | | | | → | | | 17 | ^{8(5)} | ^{0} | | | | |
| (Angola) | Gaca | João Sebastião Figueira Gaca | 27 | DF | | | | | | | | → | | | 4 | ^{23(1)} | ^{1} | → | | | | | | |
| (Angola) | Gastão | Gastão Nguala | | | | 2012 | | | | | | | | | | | | | | | | | | |
| (Angola) | Gláucio Bicuila | Gláucio Victor Bicuila | 30 | FW | 2011 | 2012 | | 28 | – | 2016 | → | 28 | ^{23(1)} | ^{5} | 28 | ^{5(5)} | ^{3} | 28 | ^{5(4)} | ^{0} | | | | |
| (Angola) | Gláucio Saiombe | Jacinto Tembo Saiombe | 27 | FW | | | | | | 2016 | | 13 | ^{10(2)} | ^{2} | 13 | ^{14(7)} | ^{1} | 13 | ^{10(3)} | ^{4} | | | | |
| (Angola) | Godzila | Pedro Domingos Sengo | | DF | | | | | | | → | 3 | ^{2(1)} | ^{0} | | | | | | | | | | |
| (Angola) | Guelor | | | | 2011 | | | – | | | | | | | | | | | | | | | | |
| (Angola) | Heritié | | | FW | | | | 7 | | | | | | | | | | | | | | | | |
| (Angola) | Hervé | | | DF | | | | | 28 | | | | | | | | | | | | | | | |
| (Angola) | Ilonga | Ilonga Lifu Taty | | MF | | | | | 9 | | | | | | | | | | | | | | | |
| (Angola) | Inácio | | | | | 2012 | | | | | | | | | | | | | | | | | | |
| (Angola) | Isaías Agostinho | Isaías José Agostinho | 27 | MF | | | | 8 | 8 | – | 16 | 16 | ^{23} | ^{0} | 14 | ^{4(1)} | ^{0} | 8 | ^{3(1)} | ^{0} | | | | |
| (Angola) | Jajão | | | | | | | | | | | | | | 16 | ^{2} | ^{0} | | | | | | | |
| (Angola) | Jamaica | | | | 2011 | 2012 | | | | | | | | | | | | | | | | | | |
| (Angola) | Jarito | | | FW | | | | – | | | | | | | | | | | | | | | | |
| (Democratic Republic of the Congo) | Jiresse | Mawiya Tutona Jiresse | 23 | FW | | | | | 11 | | | | | | | | | | | | | | | |
| (Angola) | Jó | | | FW | | | | – | | | | | | | | | | | | | | | | |
| (Angola) | Jó Paciência | Joaquim Cristóvão Paciência | 24 | FW | | | | | | | | 27 | ^{9(1)} | ^{2} | → | | | 27 | ^{17(1)} | ^{8} | | | | → |
| (Brazil) | Joaelton | Joaelton Jonathan Sampaio | 26 | FW | | | | – | | | | | | | | | | | | | | | | |
| (Angola) | Jojó | | | | | 2012 | | | | | | | | | | | | | | | | | | |
| (Angola) | Jojó | | | DF | | | | | | | | | | | 21 | ^{2(3)} | ^{1} | | | | | | | |
| (Angola) | Josué Bunga | João Eduardo Bunga | 20 | GK | | | | | | | | | | | → | | | 1 | ^{6(1)} | ^{0} | | | | |
| (Angola) | Kembua | Nkembo Garcia | 32 | FW | | | | | | | | | | | 25 | ^{4(1)} | ^{0} | | | | | | | |
| (Angola) | Lambito | Osvaldo Vasco Carlos | 30 | GK | | | | | | | | → | | | 22 | ^{8} | ^{0} | → | | | | | | |
| (Angola) | Langanga, Landu | Landu Langanga | 22 | GK | | | | | | | → | 1 | ^{12} | ^{0} | → | | | | | | | | | |
| (Angola) | Laúcha | Ivan Cláudio França Joanes | | MF | | 2012 | | | | | | | | | | | | | | | | | | |
| (Angola) | Leo Zamba | Leonilde Gongo Zamba | 30 | GK | | | | | | → | – | 12 | ^{1} | ^{0} | 12 | ^{19} | ^{0} | 12 | ^{11} | ^{0} | | | | |
| (Angola) | Limpassa | | | MF | | | | | 17 | | | | | | | | | | | | | | | |
| (Angola) | Love, João | João Love | | FW | | | | | | | → | 26 | ^{2(2)} | ^{0} | | | | | | | | | | |
| (Brazil) | Luciano Câmara | Luciano Carlos Marques Câmara | 24 | | | 2012 | → | | | | | | | | | | | | | | | | | |
| (Angola) | Luís Tati | Luís Bumba Tati | 23 | MF | | | | 10 | 10 | → | | | | | | | | | | | | | | |
| (Angola) | Macaia | José Macaia Ganga | 21 | MF | | | | 29 | 29 | → | | | | | | | | | | | | | | |
| (Angola) | Madzou | Madzou Tsoumou Tholf Fauriez | | DF | | | | | | | 14 | 14 | ^{14} | ^{0} | → | | | | | | | | | |
| (Republic of the Congo) | Makosso | Holgersson Makosso Ndouma | | DF | | | | 5 | 5 | | | | | | | | | | | | | | | |
| (Angola) | Malaba | Mbunga Ambrósio Paulo | | | → | 2012 | | | | | | | | | | | | | | | | | | |
| (Angola) | Malik | | | MF | 2011 | 2012 | | – | | | | | | | | | | | | | | | | |
| (Angola) | Manucho Tomé | João Rodrigues Tomé | 28 | GK | | | | → | 30 | | | | | | | | | | | | | | | |
| (Angola) | Manucho Tibúrcio | José Tibúrcio | | GK | | | | 22 | – | 2016 | | 30 | | | 30 | ^{2} | ^{0} | | | | | | | |
| (Angola) | Marcelo | | | | | | | | – | | | | | | | | | | | | | | | |
| (Angola) | Marcolino | | | | | | | | – | | | | | | | | | | | | | | | |
| (Angola) | Mariano Luvunga | Mariano Ribeiro Luvunga | 31 | MF | | | | | | | | → | | | 2 | ^{3(1)} | ^{0} | | | | | | | |
| (Democratic Republic of the Congo) | Masudi | Samuel Masudi Mampuya | | | | 2012 | | | | | | | | | | | | | | | | | | |
| (Angola) | Matondo | | | | | | | | | 2016 | | | | | | | | | | | | | | |
| (Angola) | Mick | | | | 2011 | | | | | | | | | | | | | | | | | | | |
| (Angola) | Miguel Mbuandi | Miguel Culungo Mbuandi | | FW | | | | 26 | | 2016 | | 15 | ^{5} | ^{0} | | | | | | | | | | |
| (Angola) | Minguito | | | DF | 2011 | 2012 | | 21 | 21 | | | | | | | | | | | | | | | |
| (Angola) | Moussa | | | MF | | | | | 17 | | | | | | | | | | | | | | | |
| (Angola) | Mufuma | Osvaldo Augusto Macaia Mufuma | | DF | | | | | | | | | | | 23 | ^{2} | ^{1} | → | | | | | | |
| (Angola) | Nanayo | Nelson Candumbo Moma | 25 | DF | | | | → | 23 | → | | | | | | | | | | | | | | |
| (Angola) | Nani | Sebastião Quionga Luvualo | | DF | 2011 | 2012 | | 2 | 2 | | – | 2 | ^{17} | ^{0} | → | | | 2 | ^{4(1)} | ^{0} | | | | |
| (Angola) | Nanú | | | DF | | | | | 27 | | | | | | | | | | | | | | | |
| (Angola) | Nelinho | | | | | | | | | | | | | | 8 | ^{2(1)} | ^{0} | | | | | | | |
| (Angola) | Neruda | Stélvio de Assis Vieira de Olim | | MF | → | 2012 | | | | | | | | | | | | | | | | | | |
| (Angola) | Nick Yanick | Nelito Ndombele Yanick | | FW | | | | | 7 | | | | | | | | | | | | | | | |
| (Angola) | Nuno Santana | José Eduardo de Azevedo Santana | | | 2011 | | | | | | | | | | | | | | | | | | | |
| (Angola) | Nzau Lutumba | Nzau Miguel Lutumba | 28 | DF | | | | | | | | | | | 21 | ^{8(2)} | ^{1} | | | | | | | |
| (Angola) | Orlando | | | | 2011 | 2012 | | | | | | | | | | | | | | | | | | |
| (Angola) | Osvaldo | | | MF | | 2012 | | | | 2016 | | 24 | ^{(5)} | ^{0} | 24 | ^{3(3)} | ^{0} | | | | | | | |
| (Democratic Republic of the Congo) | Owe | Bonyanga Ituku Owe | | | | | | | | | | 18 | ^{5(2)} | ^{2} | | | | | | | | | | |
| (Angola) | Paíto | Paito Panga José Sangue | | | | 2012 | | | | | | | | | | | | | | | | | | |
| (Angola) | Patrick | | | | | 2012 | | | | | | | | | | | | | | | | | | |
| (Angola) | Pedrien | Pedro António Lucombo | | DF | 2011 | 2012 | | 15 | → | | | | | | | | | | | | | | | |
| (Angola) | Pedrito Bonze | Pedro Felix Bonze | | DF | | | | | | | | | | | 20 | ^{22} | ^{0} | 20 | ^{2} | ^{0} | | | | |
| (Angola) | Pino | António Alberto Sumbo Luemba | 23 | MF | | | | | | 2016 | 8 | 8 | ^{21(3)} | ^{0} | → | | | | | | | | | |
| (Democratic Republic of the Congo) | Raúl | Raul Kidumu Koko | | MF | 2011 | → | | | | | | | | | | | | | | | | | | |
| (Democratic Republic of the Congo) | Reginó | Mukendi Mbyia Regino | 29 | MF | | | | | | | | | | | → | | | 14 | ^{17} | ^{0} | | | | → |
| (Angola) | Richie | Pedro Lundoloki | | MF | | | | | | | | → | | | 19 | ^{5(1)} | ^{0} | | | | | | | |
| (Republic of the Congo) | Ruud | Ruud Eufrey Mesmin Bocko | 22 | GK | | | | | | | | 22 | ^{13(1)} | ^{0} | → | | | | | | | | | |
| (Angola) | Shoma | António Pedro Costa | 23 | FW | | | | | | | 15 | 9 | ^{8(9)} | ^{2} | 9 | ^{19(5)} | ^{6} | 9 | ^{2(3)} | ^{0} | | | | |
| (Angola) | Simão Veya | Rosalino Baleiro Veya | 27 | DF | 2011 | 2012 | – | 16 | 3 | 2016 | → | 4 | ^{17(1)} | ^{0} | → | | | | | | | | | |
| (Angola) | Sotto † | António Virgílio Sotto-Mayor | 31 | MF | | 2012 | | | | | | | | | | | | | | | | | | |
| (Democratic Republic of the Congo) | Tamundele | Tamundele Liseke Dalco | 25 | FW | | | | | 14 | | | | | | | | | | | | | | | |
| (Angola) | Tchingane | Frederico Baioca M. Zau | | DF | | | | | | 2016 | 20 | 20 | ^{23} | ^{1} | → | | | 30 | ^{4} | ^{0} | | | | |
| (Angola) | Tonda | Natonda Bio Mbutuka | | | | 2012 | | | | | | | | | | | | | | | | | | |
| (Angola) | Torres | | | MF | | | | 3 | | | | | | | | | | | | | | | | |
| (Democratic Republic of the Congo) | Toto | Toto Simon | | | → | 2012 | | | | | | | | | | | | | | | | | | |
| (Mali) | Traoré | | | | | | | | | | | 25 | ^{2} | ^{0} | | | | | | | | | | |
| (Democratic Republic of the Congo) | Tresor, Lubanbalu | Lubanbalu Sylla Tresor | 28 | MF | | | | | 20 | | | | | | | | | | | | | | | |
| (Angola) | Tresor Sousa | Tresor Stanisias de Sousa | 22 | MF | | | | | 13 | | | | | | | | | | | | | | | |
| (Angola) | Tsutsa | Pedro Omana Tsutsa | | | → | 2012 | | | | | | | | | | | | | | | | | | |
| (Angola) | Valoy | | | | | | | | | | | | | | | | | 15 | ^{(4)} | ^{1} | | | | |
| (Cameroon) | Van Basten | Neba Van Basten Canonier | 21 | FW | | | | | 24 | 2016 | | | | | | | | | | | | | | |
| (Angola) | Vata | | | | | | | | – | | | | | | | | | | | | | | | |
| (Angola) | Venâncio Kukula | Venâncio Landu Kukula | | MF | | | | | 19 | 2016 | | 19 | ^{4(2)} | ^{0} | 5 | ^{5(2)} | ^{0} | 21 | ^{16} | ^{0} | | | | |
| (Angola) | Victor | | | MF | | | | | 16 | | | | | | | | | | | | | | | |
| (Angola) | Wiwí | Arão Manuel Lologe | | DF | | | | | | 2016 | 5 | 5 | ^{21(1)} | ^{1} | → | | | | | | | | | |
| (Angola) | Yanick, Nelito | Nelito Ndombele Yanick | | FW | | 2012 | | – | | | | | | | | | | | | | | | | |
| (Angola) | Yano | | | | | | | | – | | | | | | | | | | | | | | | |
| (Angola) | Yele | Gabriel João Manuel | 26 | MF | | | | | | | → | 7 | ^{2(8)} | ^{0} | 7 | ^{23} | ^{2} | 7 | ^{15(1)} | ^{0} | | | | |
| (Angola) | Yeyé | João Sanda Pedro | 25 | DF | | | → | 24 | 24 | | | | | | | | | | | | | | | |
| (Angola) | Yuyú | João Sama Mateus | | | → | 2012 | | | | | | | | | | | | | | | | | | |
| (Democratic Republic of the Congo) | Zamba Ngolu | Zamba Victor Ngolu | | GK | 2011 | 2012 | | | | | | | | | | | | | | | | | | |
| (Angola) | Zé Trindade | Josué dos Anjos Romeu Trindade | | DF | | | | | | | | → | | | 26 | ^{22(2)} | ^{0} | 26 | ^{2(1)} | ^{0} | | | | |
| (Angola) | Zeca Macosso | Maurício Dembe Macosso | 32 | MF | | 2012 | | 25 | 25 | | | | | | → | | | 25 | ^{14} | ^{1} | | | | → |
| Years | | | | | 2011 | 2012 | 2013 | 2014 | 2015 | 2016 | 2017 | 2018 | | | 2018–19 | | 28 | 2019–20 | | 20 | | | | |

== 2001-2010 ==
Sporting Clube de Cabinda players 2001–2010

| Nat | Nick | Name | A | P | – | A.C. | A.N. | I.B. | A.C. | JCK | Albano César | | | V.M. | |
| Nat | Nick | Name | A | P | 2001 | 2002 | 2003 | 2004 | 2005 | 2006 | 2007 | 2008 | 2009 | 2010 | |
| Nat | Nick | Name | A | P | 1a | 7 | 9 | 9 | 9 | 14 | 2a | 2a | 1a | 15 | |
|---|---|---|---|---|---|---|---|---|---|---|---|---|---|---|---|
| (Republic of the Congo) | Abó | Arthur Ngoulou-Yakali Bienven | – | | | | | | 2005 | 2006 | | | 2009 | 2010 | |
| (Angola) | Adolfo | | | FW | | | 2003 | 2004 | 2005 | | | | | | |
| (Angola) | Agostinho | | | | | | | | | | 2007 | | | | |
| (Angola) | Alain | | | | | 2002 | 2003 | 2004 | 2005 | 2006 | | | | | |
| (Angola) | Alex | | | MF | | | | | | 2006 | | | | | |
| (Angola) | Ângelo | Ângelo da Cruz Lelo Chimpanzo | 28 | DF | | | | | → | 2006 | → | | | | |
| (Angola) | Armando | | | | | | | | | 2006 | | | | | |
| (Brazil) | Bala | | | FW | | | | | | | | | | 2010 | |
| (Angola) | Bendinha | | | | | | 2003 | 2004 | | | | | | | |
| (Angola) | Beny | | | | | | | | | | | 2008 | | | |
| (Angola) | Bijano | Bijano Kavuanda | | GK | | | 2003 | | | 2006 | 2007 | | | | |
| (Angola) | Binda | | | | | | | | | | | | | 2010 | |
| (Angola) | Black | Edson António Francisco | | | | | | | → | 2006 | → | | | | |
| (Angola) | Boavista | | | | | | | 2004 | 2005 | 2006 | | | | | |
| (Angola) | Careca | Nanizawo Jacque António | 21 | MF | | | | | | | | | | 2010 | → |
| (Angola) | Chiló | | | | | | | | 2005 | 2006 | | | | | |
| (Democratic Republic of the Congo) | Christ | Christ Bongo-Zanoni | 32 | FW | | | | | | 2006 | 2007 | 2008 | | | |
| (Angola) | Couto | | | | | | | | | | | 2008 | 2009 | | |
| (Angola) | Dady Pedro | Kinzunga Mbienga Pedro | | MF | | | | | 2005 | | | | | | |
| (Angola) | Dedas | Benjamim Francisco de Oliveira | | | | | | | | → | 2007 | → | | | |
| (Angola) | Didí | | | DF | | | | 2004 | | | | | | | |
| (Angola) | Djodjo | | | | | | | | | | 2007 | | 2009 | 2010 | |
| (Angola) | Dudú | | | DF | | | | | 2005 | 2006 | | | | | |
| (Angola) | Ekobolo | Ramazani Ewuizi | 32 | GK | | | | → | 2005 | → | | | | | |
| (Angola) | Eli | | | | | | 2003 | 2004 | 2005 | 2006 | | | | | |
| (Angola) | Emena | Daniel Emena Kwazambi | | DF | | | 2003 | | 2005 | 2006 | | 2008 | | | |
| (Angola) | Etumba | | | | | | | 2004 | | | | | | | |
| (Angola) | Eugénio | | | | | 2002 | | | | | | | | | |
| (Angola) | Fanfan | Francisco Banganga Bicuila | 42 | FW | | | | | 2005 | 2006 | | | | | |
| (Angola) | Fefé | | | | | | | 2004 | 2005 | | | | | 2010 | |
| (Angola) | Fiston | | | | | | | | | | | 2008 | 2009 | | |
| (Angola) | Folha | | | | | | | | | | | | | 2010 | |
| (Angola) | Francisco | | | | | | | | | | | 2008 | 2009 | 2010 | |
| (Angola) | Gastão | Gastão Nguala | | | | | 2003 | 2004 | 2005 | 2006 | 2007 | 2008 | 2009 | 2010 | |
| (Angola) | Guelor | | | | | | | | | | | | 2009 | 2010 | |
| (Angola) | Guy | | | FW | | | | | | 2006 | | | | | |
| (Angola) | Isaac | | | | | | | 2004 | | | | | | | |
| (Angola) | Jack | | | | | | | | | 2006 | | | | | |
| (Angola) | Jamaica | | | | | | | | | | 2007 | 2008 | | | |
| (Angola) | Jimmy | | | | | | | | | | | 2008 | | | |
| (Angola) | Joao Cláudio | | | GK | | | | | | | | | | 2010 | |
| (Angola) | Jorge | | | | | | | 2004 | | | | | | | |
| (Angola) | José | | | | | | 2003 | | | | | | | | |
| (Angola) | Joseph | | | | | | | | | | | | | 2010 | |
| (Angola) | Kalusha † | Manianga Banza | 32 | | | | | | | | | | 2009 | 2010 | |
| (Angola) | Kani | | | | | | 2003 | 2004 | | | | | | | |
| (Angola) | Katame | | | | | | | | | | | 2008 | | | |
| (Angola) | Kikiri | Ntembo Kikiri | | | | | | | 2005 | | | | | | |
| (Togo) | Kodjo | Tossou Kodjo David | 25 | | | | | | | 2006 | | → | 2009 | | |
| (Angola) | Lakou | | | | | | | | | | 2007 | | | | |
| (Angola) | Lami | Paulo Monteiro Lami | 31 | MF | | | | | | | | | → | 2010 | → |
| (Angola) | Lelo | Ângelo da Cruz Lelo Chimpanzo | | | | | | | | 2006 | | | | | |
| (Angola) | Lucien | | | | | 2002 | 2003 | 2004 | | | | | | | |
| (Angola) | Malick | | | FW | | | 2003 | | 2005 | 2006 | | 2008 | 2009 | 2010 | |
| (Angola) | Mama | | | | | | | 2004 | | | | | | | |
| (Democratic Republic of the Congo) | Mandiangu | Mandiangu Kimpembe | | | | | | → | 2005 | 2006 | | | | | |
| (Angola) | Manucho | João Rodrigues Tomé | | GK | | | | | | | | 2008 | 2009 | 2010 | |
| (Democratic Republic of the Congo) | Masudi | Samuel Masudi Mampuya | – | | | | | 2004 | 2005 | | | | | | ↑ |
| (Angola) | Mbunga | Alain Mbunga Mayo | | | | | | | 2005 | 2006 | | | | | |
| (Angola) | Minguito | | | | | | | | | | 2007 | | | | |
| (Angola) | Mitó | | | | | | 2003 | 2004 | | | | | | | |
| (Angola) | Moche | Moche Iyeti | 30 | GK | | | 2003 | 2004 | → | 2006 | → | | | | |
| (Angola) | Nanana | Vasco Manuel Jorge Custódio | | MF | | | | | | | | | 2009 | | |
| (Angola) | Nandinho | | | | | | | | | | | | | 2010 | |
| (Angola) | Nani | | | DF | | | | | | | | | 2009 | 2010 | |
| (Angola) | Nato Faial | Pedro Renato Faial | | | | | 2003 | | | | | | | | |
| (Angola) | Ndombolo | | | | | | | | | 2006 | | | | | |
| (Angola) | Nelo | | | FW | | | | 2004 | | | | | | | |
| (Angola) | Nilson | Nilson Marilo Fernandes | | | | | 2003 | | | | 2007 | 2008 | | | |
| (Angola) | Nonó | | | | | | | 2004 | 2005 | | | | | | |
| (Angola) | Orlando | | | | | | | | | | | | | 2010 | |
| (Angola) | Papy | | | GK | | | | | 2005 | 2006 | | | | | |
| (Angola) | Patrick | | | | | | | | | | | | 2009 | | |
| (Angola) | Paxe | | | | | | 2003 | 2004 | 2005 | 2006 | | | | | |
| (Angola) | Paulo André | Paulo de Jesus André | | | | | 2003 | 2004 | | | | | | | |
| (Angola) | Pedrien | Pedro António Lucombo | | DF | | | | | | | | | 2009 | 2010 | |
| (Angola) | Pedro | | | | | | | | | 2006 | 2007 | 2008 | | | |
| (Angola) | Pitchu | | | | | | | | | | 2007 | 2008 | | | |
| (Angola) | Popion | | | | | | 2003 | 2004 | | | | | | | |
| (Angola) | Puto Boca | | | | | | | | 2005 | 2006 | 2007 | | | | |
| (Angola) | Raúl | Raul Kidumu Koko | | FW | | | | | | 2006 | 2007 | → | | | |
| (Angola) | Riquinho | Henrique Agostinho Morais Sebastião | | MF | | | 2003 | | | | | | | | |
| (Angola) | Sumuna | | | GK | | | | 2004 | | | | | | | |
| (Angola) | Tiganá | | | | | | | | | | | | 2009 | | |
| (Angola) | Tonda | Natonda Bio Mbutuka | | | | | 2003 | 2004 | 2005 | 2006 | → | | | | |
| (Angola) | Tony | | | | | | 2003 | | | | | | | | |
| (Angola) | Tyson | | | | | | 2003 | | | | | | | | |
| (Angola) | Vemba | Vemba Luzizila | | | | | | | | | | | 2009 | | |
| (Angola) | Vicente | | | | | | | | | | | 2008 | | | |
| (Angola) | Walter | | | | | | | | | | | | 2009 | | |
| (Angola) | Yano | | | | | | | | | | | 2008 | | | |
| (Angola) | Yú | | | | | | | | | 2006 | 2007 | | | | |
| (Democratic Republic of the Congo) | Zamba | Zamba Victor Ngolu | | GK | | | | | 2005 | → | | | | | |
| (Angola) | Zapa | | | | | | | 2004 | 2005 | 2006 | | | | | |
| (Angola) | Ze Bengo | | | | | | | 2004 | | | | | | | |
| (Angola) | Zeno | | | | | | | | 2005 | | | | | | |
| Years | | | | | 2001 | 2002 | 2003 | 2004 | 2005 | 2006 | 2007 | 2008 | 2009 | 2010 | |

== 1991-2000 ==
Sporting Clube de Cabinda players 1991–2000

| Nat | Nick | Name | A | P | | | | | | | | | | JCK |
| Nat | Nick | Name | A | P | 1991 | 1992 | 1993 | 1994 | 1995 | 1996 | 1997 | 1998 | 1999 | 2000 |
| Nat | Nick | Name | A | P | – | – | – | – | – | – | – | – | 10 | – |
|---|---|---|---|---|---|---|---|---|---|---|---|---|---|---|
| (Angola) | Além | | | | | | | | | | | | | 2000 |
| (Angola) | Biez | | | | | | | | | | | | | 2000 |
| (Angola) | Bijano | | | | | | | | | | | | | 2000 |
| (Angola) | Eli | | | | | | | | | | | | | 2000 |
| (Angola) | Eugénio | | | | | | | | | | | | | 2000 |
| (Angola) | Kani | | | | | | | | | | | | | 2000 |
| (Angola) | Luando | | | | | | | | | | | | | 2000 |
| (Angola) | Lucien | | | | | | | | | | | | | 2000 |
| (Angola) | Malik | | | | | | | | | | | | | 2000 |
| (Angola) | Mamá | | | | | | | | | | | | | 2000 |
| (Angola) | Moni | | | | | | | | | | | | | 2000 |
| (Angola) | Nilson | | | | | | | | | | | | | 2000 |
| (Angola) | Tyson | | | | | | | | | | | | | 2000 |
| (Angola) | Zé Aude | | | | | | | | | | | | | 2000 |
