= 2005 Girabola =

Girabola 2005
- Season: 2005 (Feb 20–Oct 23)
- Champions: Sagrada Esperança
- Relegated: Académica do Lobito; Petro do Huambo; Sporting do Bié
- 2006 CAF Champions League: Sagrada Esperança (winner); ASA (runner-up)
- 2006 CAF Confederation Cup: Petro de Luanda (3rd place)
- Matches played: 182
- Goals scored: 346 (1.9 per match)
- Top goalscorer: Love Kabungula (13 goals)
- Biggest home win: 3 matches: ASA 4–0 Spo Bié (16 Oct 2005); Atl Nam 4–0 Spo Bié (17 Apr 2005); Ben Lua 4–0 Spo Cab (03 Jul 2005)
- Biggest away win: Spo Bié 0–4 Int Lua (31 Jul 2005)
- Highest scoring: Pri Ago 5–2 Atl Nam (13 Apr 2005)
- Longest winning run: Pet Lua (5) 17 Jul - 21 Aug
- Longest unbeaten run: Pet Lua (11) 03 Jul - 26 Aug

The 2005 Girabola was the 27th season of top-tier football in Angola. The season ran from 20 February to 23 October 2005. ASA were the defending champions.

The league comprised 14 teams, the bottom three of which were relegated to the 2006 Gira Angola.

Sagrada Esperança were crowned champions, while Académica do Lobito, Petro do Huambo and Sporting do Bié were relegated.

Arsénio Kabungula aka Love of ASA finished as the top scorer with 13 goals.

== Changes from the 2004 season ==
Relegated: Académica do Soyo, Benfica do Lubango and Bravos do Maquis
Promoted: Benfica de Luanda, Desportivo da Huíla, Sporting do Bié

Locations of the 2005 Girabola teams

== League table ==
Pos	Team	Pld	W	D	L	GF	GA	GD	Pts	Qualification or relegation
1	Sagrada Esperança (C)	26	15	6	5	34	19	+15	51	Qualification for Champions League
2	ASA	26	14	8	4	37	20	+17	50	Qualification for Champions League
3	Petro de Luanda	26	14	6	6	28	17	+11	48	Qualification for Confederation Cup
4	Primeiro de Agosto	26	11	8	7	36	21	+15	41	
5	Benfica de Luanda	26	10	7	9	28	19	+9	37	
6	Primeiro de Maio	26	9	10	7	26	25	+1	37	
7	Interclube	26	8	9	9	27	28	−1	33	
8	Atlético do Namibe	26	8	9	9	25	31	−6	33	
9	Sporting de Cabinda	26	9	6	11	23	31	−8	33	
10	Progresso do Sambizanga	26	7	11	8	23	26	−3	32	
11	Desportivo da Huíla	26	7	10	9	22	25	−3	31	
12	Petro do Huambo (R)	26	8	6	12	13	19	−6	30	Relegation to Provincial stages
13	Académica do Lobito (R)	26	6	7	13	20	29	−9	25	Relegation to Provincial stages
14	Sporting do Bié (R)	26	3	3	20	13	45	−32	12	Relegation to Provincial stages

Updated to match(es) played on 23 October 2005. Source: Girabola.com
Rules for classification: 1) Points; 2) Head-to-head points; 3) Head-to-head goal difference; 4) Goal difference; 5) Goals scored; 6) Fair-play points; 7) Play-off.
(C) Champions; (R) Relegated

== Results ==
Home \ Away	ACL	ASA	ATN *	BEN	DES	INT	PET	PHU	PRI	MAI	PRO	SAG	SBI	SCC
Académica do Lobito	—	0–1	0–1	0–2	1–1	2–1	1–1	1–0	1–0	2–0	1–3	1–1	2–0	1–0
ASA	2–1	—	2–3	0–2	2–0	2–1	2–0	2–0	1–0	1–0	3–1	1–2	4–0	2–1
Atlético do Namibe *	0–0	1–0	—	2–2	1–1	0–0	0–2	1–0	0–0	1–0	0–0	0–2	4–0	2–0
Benfica de Luanda	2–0	1–2	2–0	—	0–0	2–0	2–1	2–0	0–0	0–0	0–0	0–1	2–1	4–0
Desportivo da Huíla	0–0	1–1	1–0	2–1	—	2–1	0–0	2–1	0–1	1–1	0–0	1–1	3–0	3–0
Interclube	1–1	0–2	2–2	2–1	1–0	—	1–0	2–0	0–0	2–1	2–2	0–1	2–1	0–2
Petro de Luanda	1–0	2–3	1–1	1–0	2–0	1–0	—	2–1	1–0	3–1	1–0	1–0	1–0	1–1
Petro do Huambo	1–0	0–0	2–0	1–0	0–1	0–0	1–0	—	0–1	0–0	0–1	1–0	1–0	2–1
Primeiro de Agosto	3–1	1–1	5–2	1–1	3–1	1–1	1–2	1–1	—	1–1	4–1	3–0	3–0	1–0
Primeiro de Maio	1–0	2–2	4–2	1–0	1–0	2–1	0–0	0–1	2–1	—	2–1	1–1	1–0	1–1
Progresso do Sambizanga	0–0	1–1	1–1	1–1	2–0	3–1	0–2	0–0	1–0	0–0	—	0–1	1–0	2–2
Sagrada Esperança	2–1	0–0	3–0	2–0	3–1	0–0	1–0	1–0	2–1	2–2	1–0	—	3–1	0–1
Sporting do Bié	3–2	0–1	0–1	0–1	1–1	0–4	0–1	0–0	0–2	2–1	0–1	1–3	—	3–0
Sporting de Cabinda	2–1	0–0	1–0	1–0	1–0	1–2	1–1	1–0	1–2	0–1	3–1	2–1	0–0	—

Updated to match(es) played on 23 October 2005. Source: girabola.com
Legend: Blue = home team win; Yellow = draw; Red = away team win.
- Sonangol do Namibe later in the season changed its name do Atlético do Namibe

== Season statistics ==
=== Top scorers ===
Rank	Scorer	Club	Goals
1	(Angola) Love Kabungula	Petro Luanda	13
2	(Democratic Republic of the Congo) Mbunga	Sporting Cabinda	12
3	(Angola) Chinho	Sagrada Esperança	12

=== Hat-tricks ===
Player	For	Against	S	R	Date
(Angola) Bebeto	1º de Agosto	Sonangol do Namibe	5-2 (H)	15	12 March 2005

2005 Girabola winner
Grupo Desportivo Sagrada Esperança
1st title

Squad: Alex, Andia, António, Bondoso, Chinho, Fatite, Filipe, Goliath, Hélder Vicente, Jojó, Kadé, Kivota, Lebo Lebo, Maninho Loide, Marcos, Mbala, Moisés II, Nsuka, Palucho, Roque Sapiri, Santana
Head coach: Mário Calado
