= Sérgio Traguil =

Portuguese football manager

Personal information
- Date of birth: 18 October 1980 (age 46)
- Place of birth: Portalegre, Portugal

Team information
- Current team: KCCA FC

Managerial career
- Years: Team
- 2009-2012: Benfica (youth)
- 2012-2012: Kaduna United F.C.
- 2014-2015: SC Estrela Portalegre
- 2015-2016: Accra Hearts of Oak S.C.
- 2017-2017: Santa Rita de Cássia FC
- 2018-2018: Kabuscorp S.C.P.
- 2019-2019: Mirbat SC
- 2020-: ENH F.C.
- 2021: Clube Desportivo da Lunda Sul
- 2022: Singida United - DTB FC
- 2023: Township Rollers FC
- 2023-: KCCA FC
- 2024-: Abu Salim SC

Sérgio Traguil is a Portuguese football manager that worked in Benfica Youth Teams 2009 to 2012, got the 3rd place of Ghana Premier League only 3 points behind the Winner with no defeat at home matches 2016, Won the best attack of Girabola 2018, He was in 1st position, best attack of the league when FIFA removed 12 points regarding Rivaldo's case, achieve the State Cup Final with ENH from Mozambique Premier League, in 2020, then canceled by Covid 19, Won the Professional League Segundona, first ever of Club Desportivo da Lunda Sul without any defeat and with the best attack and Defense, and in 2022 Won the Championship with DTB/Singida Big Stars in Tanzania. One of the biggest achievements of the Manager was being from 2020 to 2022 without any defeats in League Matches, 2023 Botswana with the Giants Township Rollers FC, Cup Semi-finals and 4th position, with KCCA, Ugandan giants, played CAF competitions 2nd round missing the group stage by one goal, even winning the 2nd leg, currently He is Head Coach in Libya Giants Abu Salim SC from Tripoli. He is currently the Manager of Libya Premier league club Abu Salim SC.
