= Estádio Municipal Santos Diniz =

Football stadium in N'dalatando, Angola

Coordinates: 9°18′8.478″S 14°54′8.6112″E

- Interactive map of Estádio Municipal Santos Diniz
- Location: N'dalatando, Angola
- Capacity: 5,000

Tenant
- U.R. Cuanza Norte

Estádio Municipal Santos Diniz is a football stadium in N'dalatando, Cuanza Norte Province, Angola. The stadium holds 5,000.

In 2013, the stadium was the home ground of local club Porcelana Futebol Clube do Cazengo in the first division.

In 2018, the stadium has been the home ground of local club União Recreativo do Cuanza Norte in the second division.
