= Estádio Municipal do Dande =

Football stadium in Caxito, Angola

Coordinates: 08°34′46.4412″S 13°39′55.818″E

- Interactive map of Estádio Municipal do Dande
- Location: Caxito, Angola
- Capacity: 4,700

Construction
- Opened: 12 February 2015; 11 years ago

Tenants
- Domant FC; Mpatu a Ponta

Estádio Municipal do Dande is a football stadium in Caxito, the capital city of Angola's Bengo Province. It is the current home stadium of first division side Domant FC. The stadium holds 4,700.

Upon inauguration in 2015, the stadium became the home ground of local club Domant FC.
