= Ritondo =

Ritondo is a surname. Notable people with the surname include:

- Cristian Ritondo (born 1966), Argentine politician
- Patrizia Ritondo (born 1974), Italian long-distance runner
