= Mpatu a Ponta =

Angolan sports club

- Full name: Futebol Clube Mpatu a Ponta
- Ground: Angola
- Chairman: (Angola) Diogo Mpatu
- Manager: (Angola) Adilson Gomes
- League: 2nd Division
- 2018: 5th (Serie A)

Futebol Clube M'patu a Ponta is an Angolan sports club from the village of Ambriz, in Bengo province. The team currently plays in the Gira Angola.

In 2015, the club withdrew from the Gira Angola, citing financial reasons.

== Achievements ==
- Angolan League: 0

- Angolan Cup: 0

- Angolan SuperCup: 0

- Gira Angola: 0

== See also ==
- Girabola
