= C.D. São Salvador =

Angolan sports club

São Salvador
- Full name: Clube Desportivo São Salvador
- Ground: Álvaro Buta
- Chairman: Julião Mavungu
- Manager: Venâncio Ndangala
- League: Girabola
- 2025–26: 11th
| Home colours | Away colours |

Clube Desportivo São Salvador or C.D. São Salvador is an Angolan sports club in Zaire Province.

In 2013, the team participated in the Gira Angola, the qualifying tournament for Angola's top division, the Girabola.
