= Real M'buco =

Angolan football club

Real Mbuco
- Full name: Clube Desportivo Real Mbuco
- Ground: Estádio do Tafe; Cabinda, Angola
- Capacity: 9.000
- Manager: Alberto Lino Major
- League: 2nd Division
- 2015: Withdrew

Clube Desportivo Real do Mbuco is an Angolan football club from the northern province of Cabinda. While originally from the village of Mbuco Zau, they are playing their home games at the Estádio do Tafe in the province's capital city of Cabinda.

In 2015, the club withdrew from the Gira Angola, citing financial reasons.

The team plays in the Gira Angola, the Angolan second division.

== Achievements ==
- Angolan League: 0

- Angolan Cup: 0

- Angolan SuperCup: 0

== Manager history ==
- (Angola) João Manuel – 2018
- (Angola) André Manuel – 2014

== See also ==
- Girabola
- Gira Angola
