= Estádio dos Eucaliptos (Angola) =

Football stadium in Cuíto, Angola

Coordinates: 12°23′48.534″S 16°56′10.8744″E

- Interactive map of Estádio dos Eucaliptos
- Former names: Estádio Municipal do Kuito
- Location: Cuíto, Angola
- Capacity: 4,000

Construction
- Renovated: 20 June 2005; 21 years ago 5 May 2012; 14 years ago

Tenants
- Sporting Clube Petróleos do Bié; Cuando Cubango FC

Estádio dos Eucaliptos is a football stadium in Cuíto, Angola.

== History ==
Renovated in June 2005, by Nelson e Filhos, the stadium underwent a new renovation in 2008, this time by NDJ Lda and later on in 2011 by the Chinese company Sinohidro.
