= Alain Mbunga Mayo =

Congolese footballer

Personal information
- Date of death: 15 July 2012
- Position: Forward

Senior career*
Years	Team	Apps	(Gls)
1994?–2000	AS Dragons		
2001–2004	Petro Luanda		

International career
- DR Congo
- * Club domestic league appearances and goals

Alain Mbunga Mayo (died 15 July 2012) was a Congolese football striker. He was a squad member at the 1994 Africa Cup of Nations.
