= Sporting Clube de Benguela =

Angolan sports club

Sporting de Benguela
- Full name: Sporting Clube de Benguela
- Founded: 16 November 1915; 111 years ago
- Ground: Estádio do Arregaça, Benguela
- Capacity: 2,000
- Chairman: Feliciano Chiweyengue
- Manager: Leopoldo Kalundungo
- League: 2nd Division
- 2nd Division 2026–27: ▼9th 2nd Division
Home colours

Sporting Clube de Benguela or simply Sporting de Benguela, is an Angolan sports club from the city of Benguela.

== History ==
The club was founded on 16 November 1915, as the 21st branch of Lisbon-based Sporting Clube de Portugal (Sporting CP).

Since independence in 1975, up to 1988, as occurred with all the clubs whose names originated from their former colonial power, Portugal, Sporting de Benguela was renamed as Desportivo de Benguela.

The club is the owner of the Estádio do Arregaça, in the city of Benguela.

The basketball team is a regular participant in the main basketball league whereas the football team remained inactive for many years, due to financial shortages.

In 2018, the football team contested in the Gira Angola, the qualifying tournament for Angola's top division, the Girabola.

== Manager history and performance ==
Season	Coach	L2	L1	C	Coach	L2	L1	C
1982	(Portugal) Emílio Ventura		9th					
1983	(Portugal) Emílio Ventura							
1984	(Portugal) Emílio Ventura							
1985	(Portugal) José Pérides							
1986	(Portugal) José Pérides							
1989	(Angola) Pedro Garcia	(Angola) Gilberto						
1991	(Angola) Nando Jordão							
2018	(Angola) Osvaldo Roque Jony	5th						
2019	(Angola) Salvador Kingungo							
