= ASK Dragão =

Angolan sports club

- Full name: ASK Dragão
- Founded: 25 September 2012; 13 years ago
- Ground: Estádio 4 de Janeiro, Uíge
- Capacity: 5,000
- Chairman: Salomão Tchingui
- Manager: Francisco Samacumbi
Home colours

ASK Dragão is an Angolan sports club from the province of Uíge.

ASK stands for Atlético Sport Kalonji.

In 2017, the team qualified to the Gira Angola, the qualifying tournament for Angola's top division, the Girabola.

== Managers ==
- Carlos Azulinho (2017)
- Nicolau Bodó (2018)
