= Estádio das Mangueiras =

Football stadium in Saurimo, Angola

Coordinates: 9.665019°S 20.3929°E

- Interactive map of Estádio das Mangueiras
- Full name: Estádio das Mangueiras
- Location: Saurimo, Angola
- Owner: State-owned
- Capacity: 7,000

Construction
- Renovated: 16 August 2012; 14 years ago
- Cost: $7.500.00,00
- Main contractor: Grupo Sete Cunhas

Tenant
- Bikuku FC

Estádio das Mangueiras is a football stadium located at the Dr. Agostinho Neto neighborhood in the city of Saurimo, Lunda Sul province, Angola. The state-owned stadium is currently used mostly for football matches, on club level by Progresso da Lunda Sul of the Girabola. The stadium has a capacity of 7,000 spectators.

The stadium was renovated in 2012.

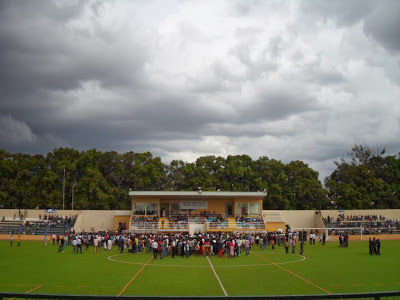
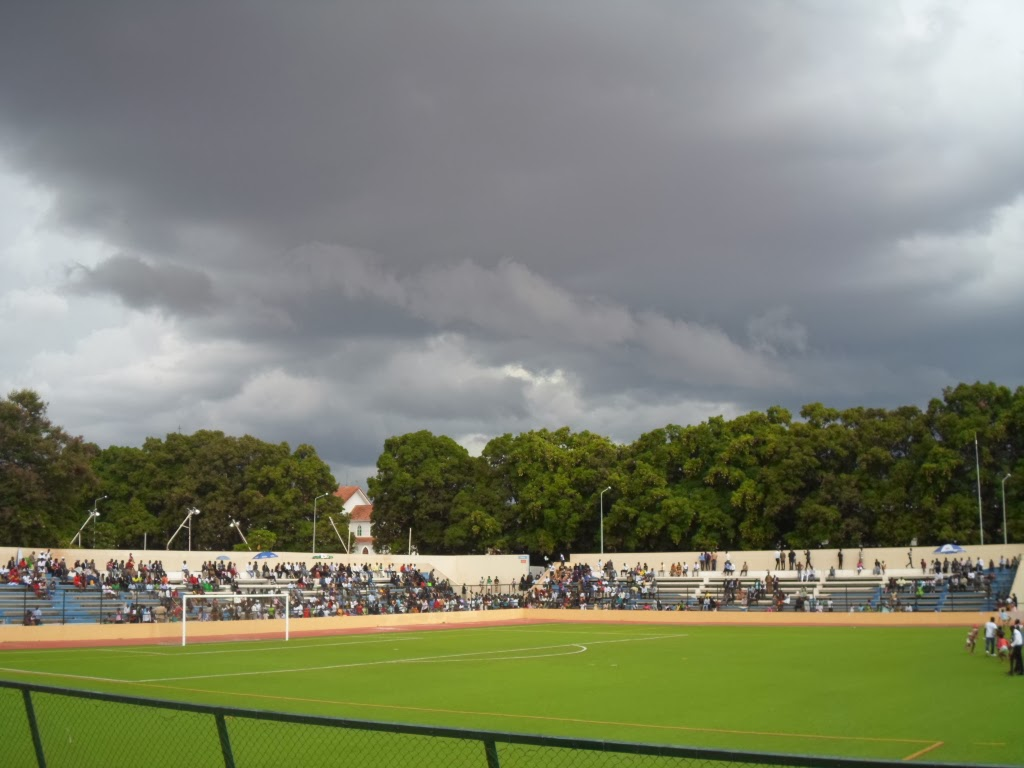
