= Saurimo FC =

Angolan sports club

- Full name: Saurimo Futebol Clube
- Ground: Estádio das Mangueiras, Saurimo
- Capacity: 7,000
- Manager: N/A
- 2018–19: ▼16th, Girabola
Home colours	Away colours

Saurimo FC, formerly Bikuku FC is an Angolan sports club from the city of Saurimo.

The club was named after the original owner, Angolan businessman Ernesto dos Santos Lino, aka Santos Bikuku.

In 2018, the team qualified to the Gira Angola, the qualifying tournament for Angola's top division, the Girabola.

Prior to its participation in the Girabola, the club changed its name to Saurimo FC.

== Staff ==
Name	Nat	Pos
Technical staff
—	(Angola)	Head coach
—	(Angola)	Assistant Coach
—	(Angola)	Assistant Coach
Medical
—	(Angola)	Physician
—	(Angola)	Physio
Management
—	(Angola)	Chairman
—	(Angola)	Head of Foot Dept

== Head coach positions ==
- (Angola) Kito Ribeiro – 2019
- (Angola) Zola Nseka – 2018
