= Estádio Municipal Edelfride Palhares da Costa =

Sports venue in Benguela, Angola

Coordinates: 12°35′37.9788″S 13°23′24.3744″E

- Interactive map of Estádio Municipal Edelfride Palhares da Costa
- Former names: Estadio Municipal de Benguela
- Location: Benguela, Angola
- Owner: State-owned
- Operator: Estrela Clube Primeiro de Maio
- Capacity: 6,000

Tenant
- Estrela Clube Primeiro de Maio

Estádio Municipal Edelfride Palhares da Costa, formerly Estádio Municipal de Benguela is a multi-use stadium in Benguela, Angola.

The stadium underwent a major rehabilitation in 2010, in the framework of the 2010 Africa Cup of Nations and was used by both the Benguela-based Egypt and Benin national football teams as practice ground.

In 2010, the stadium was handed over to Estrela Clube Primeiro de Maio for management purposes and tenancy. The stadium holds 6,000.

The stadium was renamed after Edelfride Palhares da Costa, a local football legend who played locally before moving to continental Portugal before independence where he played for some local clubs.
