= Caxito =

- Commune and town
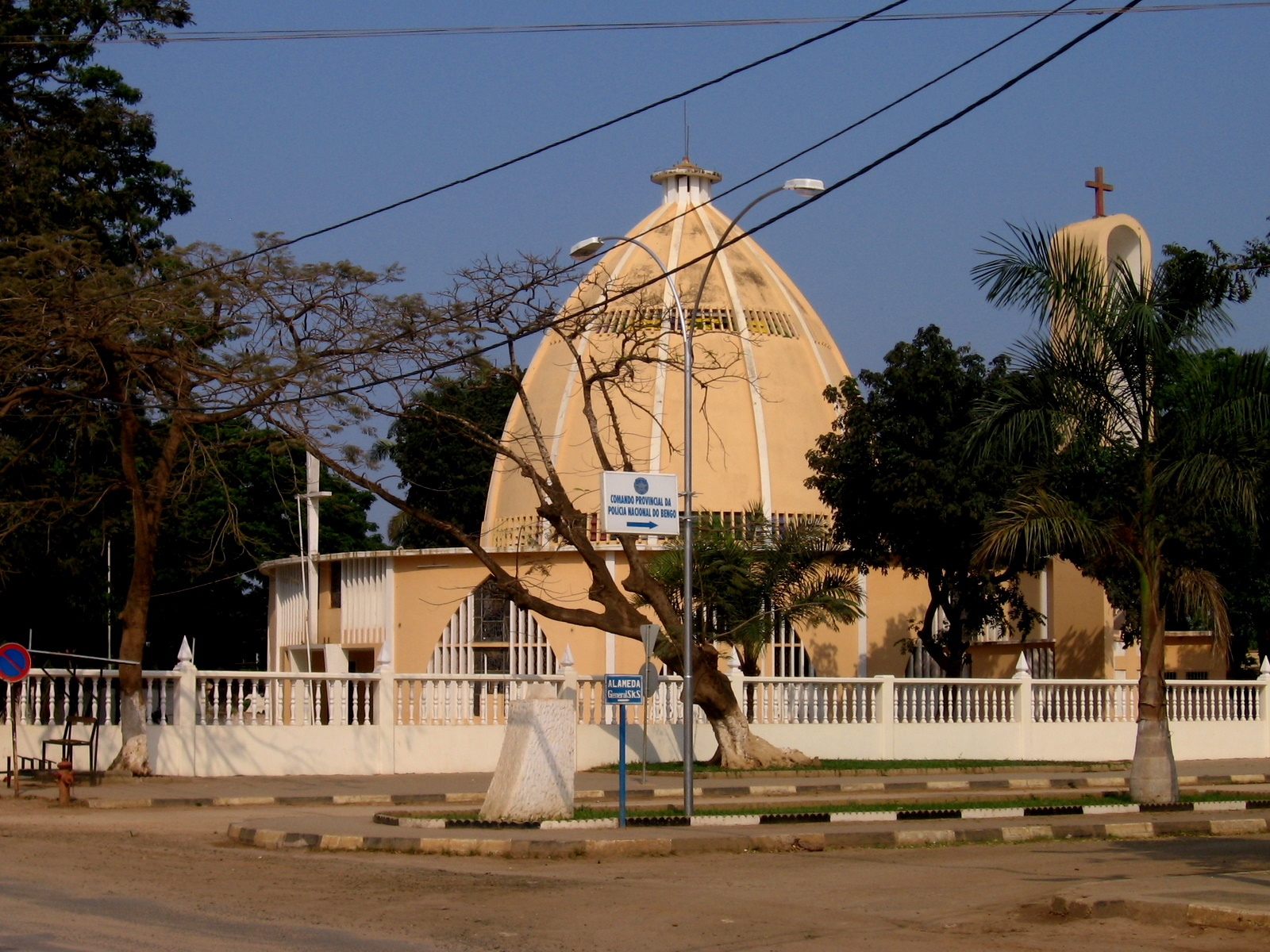

- Location in Angola
- Coordinates: 8°34′48″S 13°39′51″E
- Country: Angola
- Province: Bengo
- Municipality: Dande

Area
  - Total: 167 km^{2} (64 sq mi)
- Elevation: 84 m (276 ft)

Population (2014)
  - Total: 77,276
  - Density: 463/km^{2} (1,200/sq mi)
- Time zone: UTC+1 (WAT)
- Climate: BSh

Caxito is a town, with a population of 55,000 (2014), and a commune in the municipality of Dande, province of Bengo, Angola. It is also the capital of the province.

== Transportation ==
The northern line of Angolan Railways passes through the town.

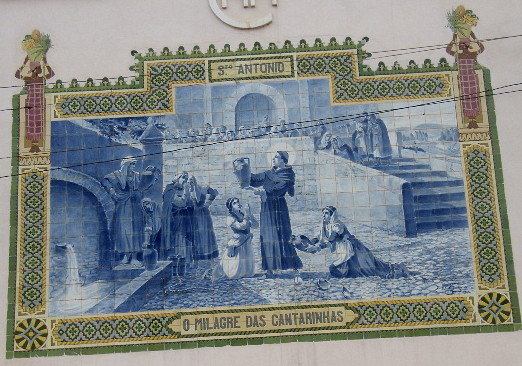
A panel of azulejos in Caxito

== Sports ==
The José Armando Sayovo Sports Complex was inaugurated in October 2025, named after the Paralympic medalist. Some of its facilities include a soccer field, athletic track, and Olympic-size swimming pool.
