= Estádio 4 de Janeiro =

Football stadium in Uíge, Angola

Coordinates: 07°36′51.9552″S 15°03′35.6292″E

- Interactive map of Estádio 4 de Janeiro
- Former names: Estádio José Ferreira de Lima
- Location: Uíge, Angola
- Capacity: 5,000

Construction
- Opened: 17 March 1968; 58 years ago

Tenants
- ASK Dragão; Santa Rita de Cássia

Estádio 4 de Janeiro is a football stadium in Uíge, Angola.

== History ==
Inaugurated on March 17, 1968, as Estádio José Ferreira de Lima, the stadium was then owned by Clube Recreativo do Uíge. Shortly after the independence, it was nationalized.

The state-owned 5,000-seat stadium is the only one in Angola's northern province of Uíge that meets the international standards to host Girabola matches. The stadium has been used by all clubs in the province participating at the provincial championship as well as the 2nd and 1st division championships.

== 2017 disaster ==
On February 10, 2017, during the inaugural match of the 2017 Girabola between home team Santa Rita de Cássia and Recreativo do Libolo, one of the stadium's access gates collapsed as supporters tried to force their way into the stadium. As a result, 17 people were trampled to death and 76 injured, 5 of whom with life-threatening injuries. The most outrageous, odd fact about this incident is that it began just about 6 minutes from the beginning of the match with the match pursuing its normal course until the end and no one inside the stadium realizing what was going on. The Police has reportedly used tear gas to disperse angry supporters.
