= Sporting Clube Petróleos do Bié =

Angolan sports club

Sporting do Bié
- Full name: Sporting Clube Petróleos do Bié
- Founded: 3 May 1915; 110 years ago
- Ground: Estádio dos Eucaliptos; Kuito, Angola
- Capacity: 16.000
- Chairman: Paulo Jorge Capama
- Manager: TBD
- League: Gira Angola
- 2018: 6th (Série B)
- Website: http://sportingclubpetroleosbie.com/

Sporting Clube Petróleos do Bié best known as Sporting do Bié is a multisports club from Kuito, Angola. The club's football team contests at the Angolan Gira Angola and Girabola competitions.

Following Angola's independence in 1975, the club went out of business and was later revamped by merging with Desportivo Sonangol and later on with Kuito's Direcção Provincial da Justiça soccer team and was renamed União Sport do Bié. Later on, it was again renamed as União Petro do Bié. In the 1990s, now being officially sponsored by Total Angola and Sonangol, the club was again renamed to its current denomination, Sporting Clube Petróleos do Bié.

== President's history ==
- Paulo Jorge Capama (2020–2024)

== Manager history ==
(Angola) Jaime Chimalanga	(1987)
(Angola) Albano César	(1999)
(Angola) João Pintar da Silva	(2001)
(Peru) Arnaldo Gamonal	(2001)
(Angola) Kidumo Pedro	(2001)	–	(Mar 2002)
(Angola) António Sayombo	(Mar 2002)	–	(2003)
(Angola) João Pintar da Silva	(2004)	–	(2005)
(Brazil) Waldemar Serdeira	(2009)	–	(2010)
(Angola) João Pintar da Silva	(2014)
(Angola) Henrique Leite	(2017)	–

== See also ==
- Girabola
- Gira Angola
