= Santa Rita de Cássia FC =

Santa Rita de Cássia
- Full name: Santa Rita de Cássia Futebol Clube
- Founded: 29 August 2015; 9 years ago
- Ground: Estádio 4 de Janeiro
- Capacity: 5,000
- Chairman: Nzolani Pedro
- Manager: João Fortuna
- League: Girabola
- 2024–25: 14th in Girabola
Home colours	Away colours

Santa Rita de Cássia Futebol Clube is an Angolan sports club from the city of Uíge. The team made its debut in the Gira Angola (Angola's second division championship) in 2016 after winning the Uige province football championship.

The club is named after Italian saint Rita of Cascia in whose honor a sanctuary was built at the village of Casseche, Uíge city, where an annual pilgrimage is held.

In 2016, its debutant year in the second division, the club managed to be promoted to Angola's top flight division, the Girabola.

== 2017 disaster ==
On 10 February 2017, shortly after the inaugural match of the 2017 Girabola between home team Santa Rita de Cássia and Recreativo do Libolo, one of the access gates of Estádio 4 de Janeiro collapsed as access was made free and attendants tried to force their way into the stadium. As a result, 17 people were trampled to death and 76 injured, 5 of whom with life-threatening injuries.

== Achievements ==
- Angolan League: 0

- Angolan Cup: 0

- Angolan SuperCup: 0

- Gira Angola: 1

2016

- Uige provincial championship: 1

2015

== Recent seasons ==
Santa Rita de Cássia's season-by-season performance since 2011:

Overall match statistics
Season	Pld	W	D	L	GF	GA	GD	%
2016	15	8	4	3	14	7	+7	0.633

Classifications
L3	L2	L1	AC
1st	1a		PR

Top season scorers
Player	L3	L2	L1	AC	T
?	?	?		?	?

- PR = Preliminary round, 1R = First round, GS = Group stage, R32 = Round of 32, R16 = Round of 16, QF = Quarter-finals, SF = Semi-finals, RU = Runner-Up, W = Winner

== Players and staff ==
=== Staff ===
Name	Nat	Pos
Technical staff
João Fortuna		Head coach
João Manuel Paulo	(Angola)	Assistant coach
TBA	(Angola)	Goal-keeper Coach
Medical
TBA	(Angola)	Physio
Management
Nzolani Pedro	(Angola)	Chairman

== Manager history ==
Season	Coach	L2	L	C	Coach	L2	L	C	Coach	L2	L	C
2016	(Angola) Paulo Saraiva											
2017	(Portugal) Sérgio Traguil				(Democratic Republic of the Congo) Lusala Dady				(Angola) Hélder Teixeira			
2018	(Angola) João Paulo				(Angola) Mbuisso António							
2019	(Angola) Nseka Nitoya				(Angola) Paulo Saraiva				(Angola) Almério Cristóvão			
2019–20	(Angola) Kiombo Pemba				(Angola) Marcos Chivinda				(Angola) Almério Cristóvão			
2020–21	(Angola) João Fortuna											

== See also ==
- Girabola
- Gira Angola
