= Estádio Municipal do Tafe =

Sports venue in Cabinda, Angola

Coordinates: 05°33′18.6984″S 12°11′8.7828″E

- Interactive map of Estádio Municipal do Tafe
- Location: Cabinda, Angola
- Capacity: 5,000

Construction
- Renovated: 4 February 2013; 13 years ago

Tenants
- Real M'buco; Sporting de Cabinda; F.C. Cabinda

Estádio Municipal do Tafe is a multi-use stadium in Cabinda, Angola. It is currently used mostly for football matches and serves as the home of Sporting de Cabinda. The stadium holds 5,000 people.
