= Saurimo =

Town in Lunda Sul, northeastern Angola

Saurimo Henrique de Carvalho
- Municipality
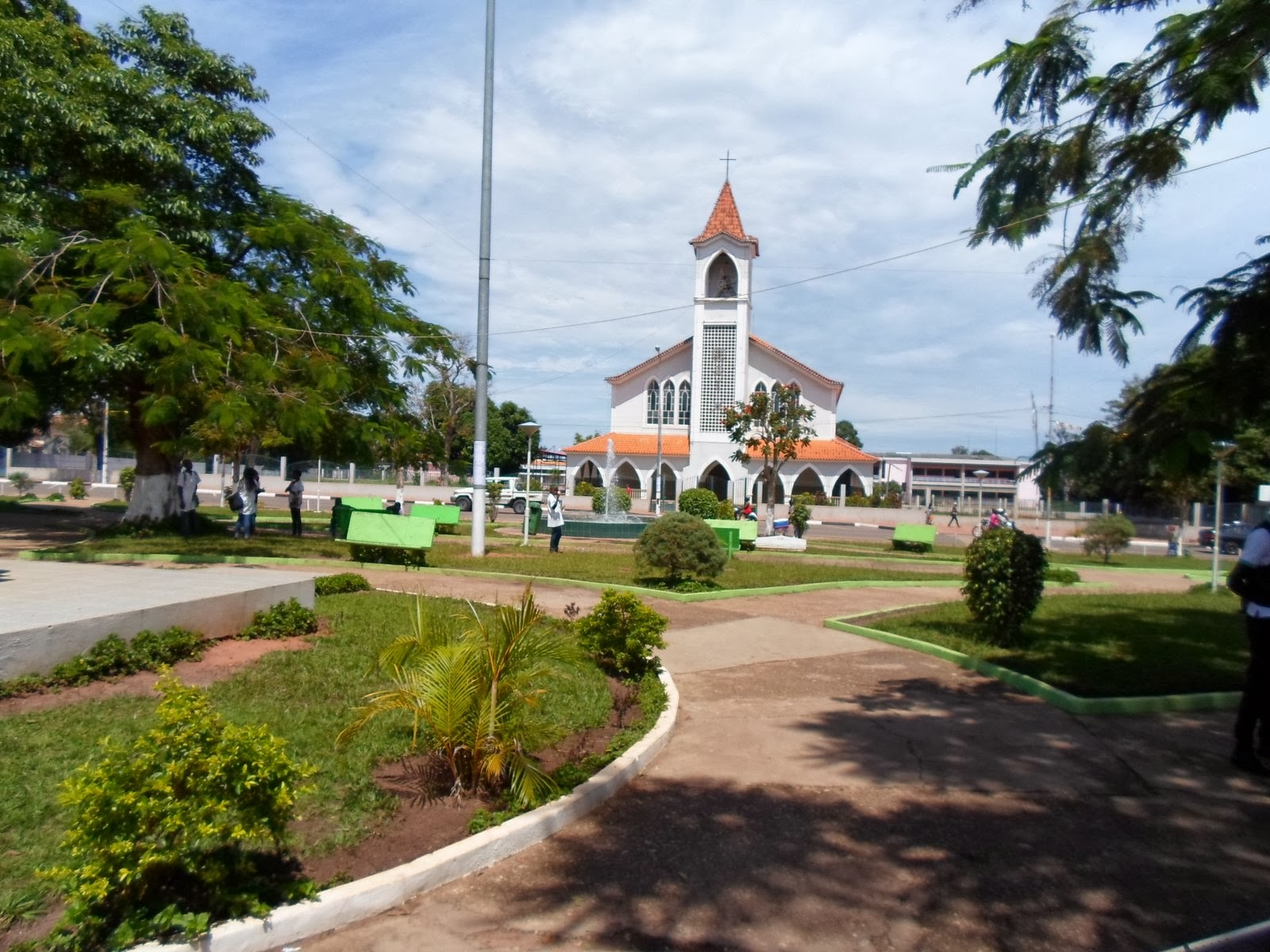
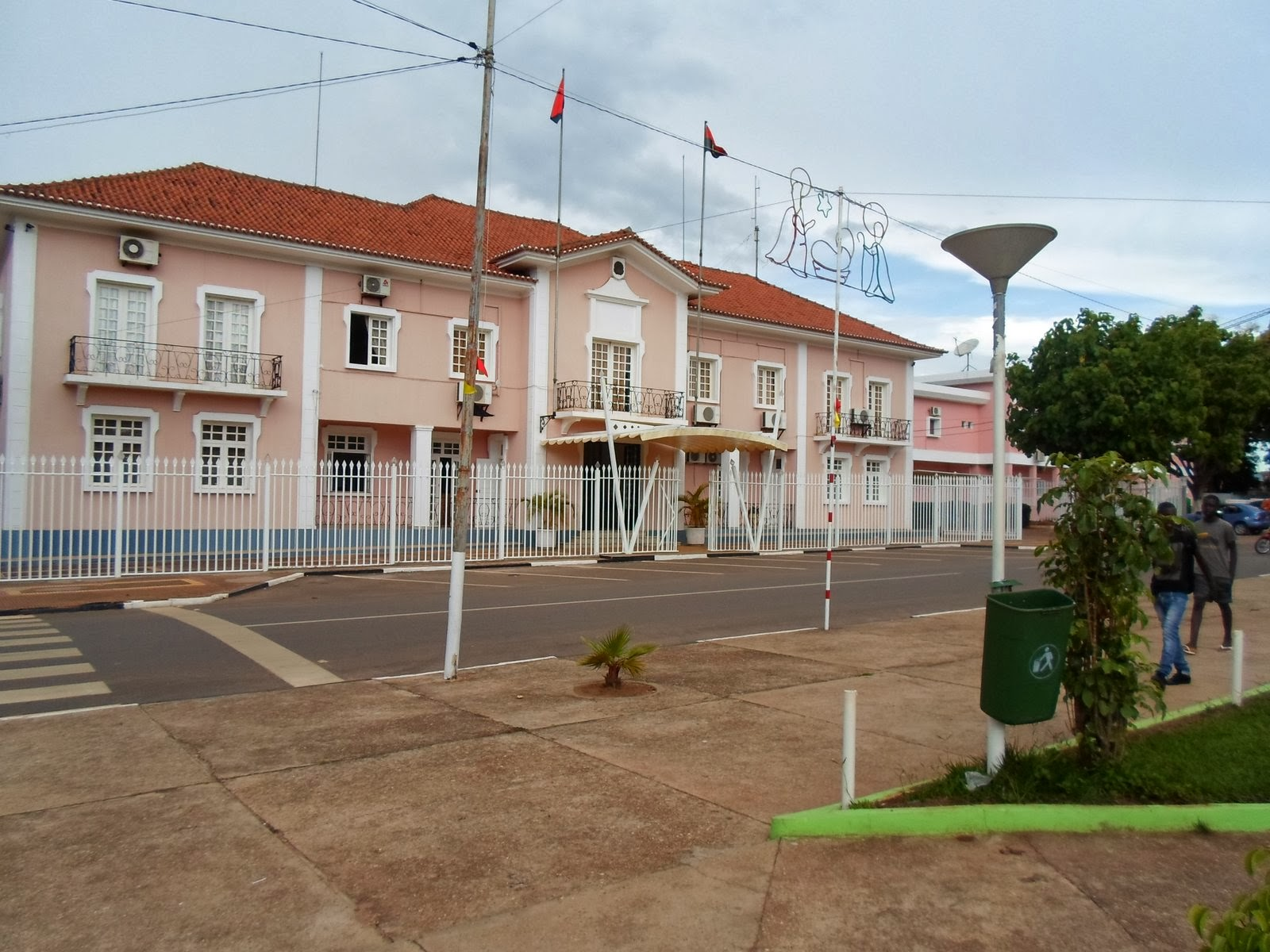
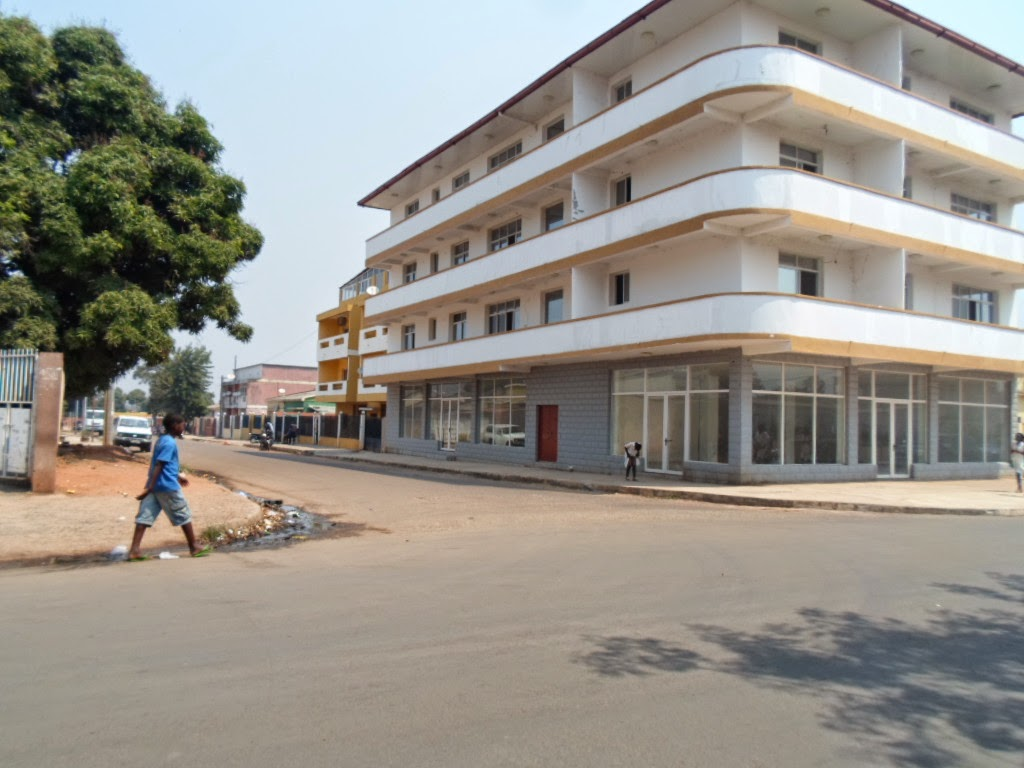
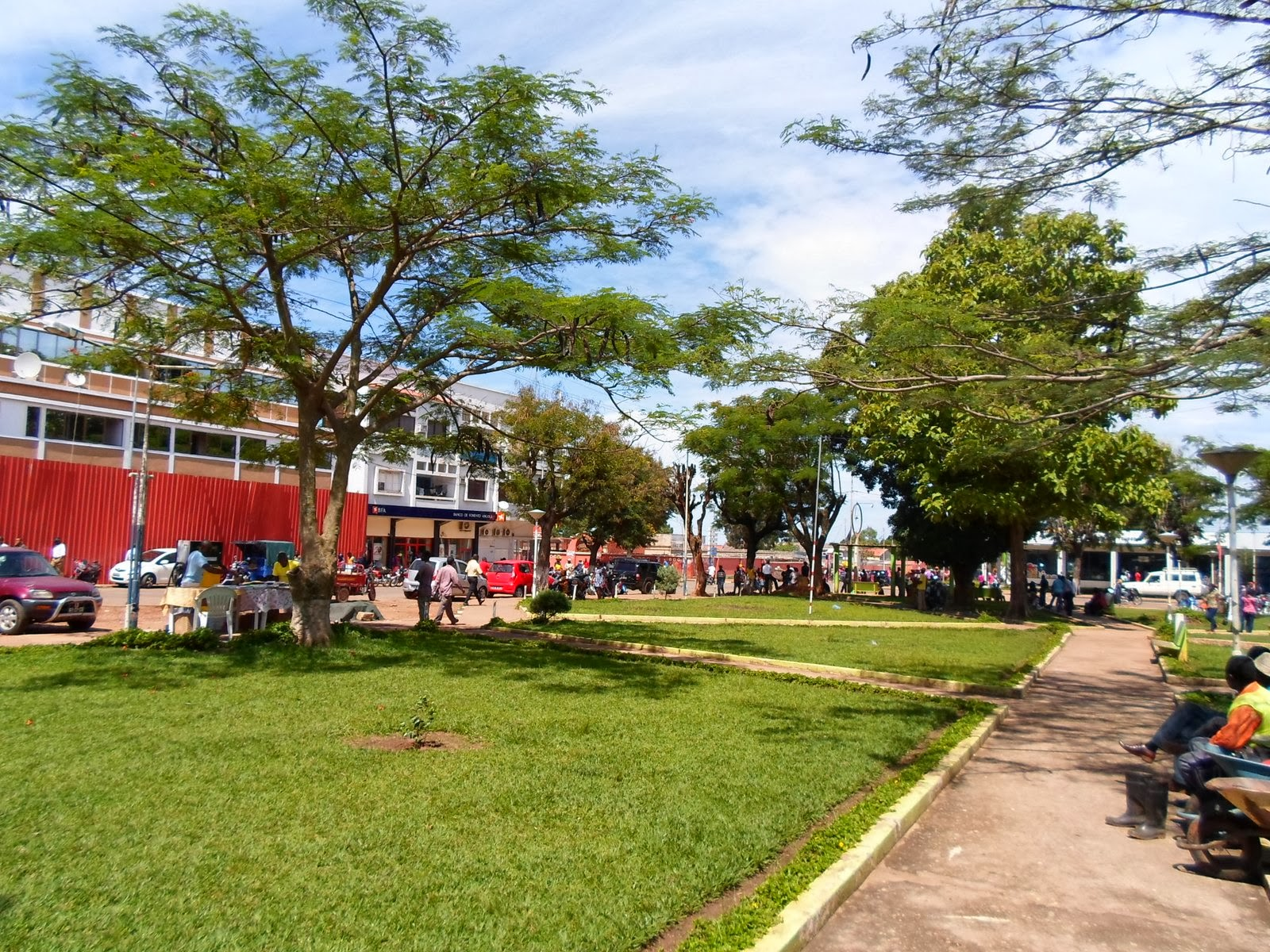

- Location in Angola
- Coordinates: 9°39′S 20°24′E
- Country: Angola
- Province: Lunda Sul Province
- Founded: 1927
- Elevation: 1,081 m (3,547 ft)

Population (2024)
  - Total: 221,538
- Time zone: UTC+1 (WAT)
- Climate: Aw

Saurimo, formerly known as Henrique de Carvalho, is a city in Angola. It is the capital of Lunda Sul Province. As of 2024, Saurimo has a population of 589,792, which steadily grows as a result of migration.

== History ==
The city was formerly known as Henrique de Carvalho, a Portuguese explorer, who visited the region in 1884 and first made contact with the local Lunda people. In 1956, Saurimo was raised to city status.

== Geography ==
Saurimo is located in northeastern Angola at an elevation of 1,084 m (3,556 ft) above sea level. It is a garrison town and local market centre.

== Economy ==
The main economic activities in Saurimo include agriculture, farming, and diamonds. Other smaller industries include fishing and handicraft. The SMC (Sociedade Mineira de Catoca) is one of the world's largest mining areas, along with Endiama which helps distribute its diamonds worldwide.

== Transportation ==
Saurimo is served by Saurimo Airport, which has scheduled service to the capital Luanda. Construction began in January 2026 on a new 260km railway from Saurimo to Luena on the Benguela Railway and is expected to take five years.

== Notable people ==
- Yola Araújo is an Angolan songwriter and musician;
