= List of F.C. Bravos do Maquis players =

Futebol Clube Bravos do Maquis is an Angolan football (soccer) club based in Luena, Moxico, Angola and plays at Estádio Jones Cufuna Mundunduleno. The club was established in 1983.

== FC Bravos do Maquis 2020–2021 ==
Nat	#	Nick	Name	A	P	Z.A.	Total Apps & Gls		
Nat	#	Nick	Name	A	P	2021	Total Apps & Gls		
Nat	#	Nick	Name	A	P	^{C}	^{S}	^{A}	^{G}
(Angola)	24	Adolfo	Miguel Samuel Panzo	28	DF	2021			
(Angola)	12	Agostinho	Agostinho José Júlio Calunga	23	GK	2021			
(Angola)	19	Aguinaldo	Aguinaldo Agostinho Matias	23	FW	2021			
(Angola)	18	Benarfa	Mankoka Hegene Afonso	20	FW	2021			
(Angola)	9	Chole	Belchior Nejó Manhinhita José	31	FW	2021			
(Angola)	17	Da Banda	Felisberto Sebastião Dala	27	MF	2021			
(Angola)	11	Estevão	Estevão Nassoma Ferreira	24	MF	2021			
(Angola)	4	Fabrício	Fabrício Mafuta	33	DF	2021			
(Angola)	13	Higino	Higino Epalanga Kapitango	17	MF	2021			
(Angola)	3	Lomalisa	Joyce Lomalisa Mutambala	28	DF	2021			
(Angola)	28	Lara	Manuel Jacinto Domingos	29	DF	2021			
(Angola)	7	Liliano	Liliano Pedro	24	FW	2021			
(Angola)	16	Lourenço	Lourenço Cambiombo Sapalo Adriano	29	DF	2021			
(Angola)	15	Makusa	Makusa Nzembe Lemi José	28	FW	2021			
(Angola)	26	Mayungo	Jacinto Bernardo Machado	24	DF	2021			
(Angola)	6	Messias	Messias Pires Neves	29	MF	2021			
(Angola)	22	Moreira	Louter Adérito Haypa	26	GK	2021			
(Angola)	30	Mussumari	Gamaliel Frederico Mussumari	30	DF	2021			
(Angola)	20	Ndié	Diogo Manzambi Kembi	28	MF	2021			
(Cape Verde)	8	Sidnei	Sidnei dos Santos Reis Mariano	35	MF	2021			
(Angola)	10	Silva	António da Silva Anato	27	MF	2021			
(Angola)	2	Tobias	Bartolomeu de Sousa Domingos	32	DF	2021			
(Republic of the Congo)	1	Tresor	Tresor Elenga	27	GK	2021			
(Angola)	29	Vadinho	Osvaldo Benedito Pinheiro	25	MF	2021			
(Angola)	–	Vasco	Vasco Augusto Inácio	25	DF	2021			
(Angola)	5	Wiwí	Arão Manuel Lologi	28	DF	2021			
(Angola)	25	Zeca	Maurício Dembe Macosso	33	MF	2021			
(Republic of the Congo)	23	Zico	Syntrick Berruguet Baloukoulou		FW	2021			
Years						2021			

== 2011–2020 ==
Nat	Nick	Name	A	P	J.P.	Z.A.	Z.A.	P.J	V.M.	J.P.	Zeca Amaral			Zeca Amaral									Total Apps & Gls			
Nat	Nick	Name	A	P	2011	2012	2013	2014	2015	2016	2017 (11th)			2018 (8th)			2018–19 (10th)			2019–20			Total Apps & Gls			
Nat	Nick	Name	A	P	8	7	3	6	14	1b	^{#}	^{A}	^{G}	^{#}	^{A}	^{G}	^{#}	^{A}	^{G}	^{#}	^{A}	^{G}	^{S}	^{A}	^{G}	
(Angola)	Adérito	Manuel C. Adérito		FW													6	^{1(7)}	^{0}	6	^{1(3)}	^{0}				
(Angola)	Adolfo Panzo	Miguel Samuel Panzo	–	DF													24	^{2}	^{0}	24	^{(1)}	^{0}	↑			
(Angola)	Agostinho Calunga	Agostinho José Júlio Calunga	–	GK										12	^{DNP}		12	^{17}	^{0}	12	^{7}	^{0}	↑			
(Angola)	Agugú	Agostinho Paciência	28	FW					→	–																
(Angola)	Alex			GK					26	22																
(Cameroon)	Alex	Alexandre	24	MF							20	^{6(1)}	^{0}													
(Angola)	Álvaro Tatala	Álvaro Sunga Tatala		FW			2013																			
(Angola)	Amaro	Amândio Manuel Filipe da Costa	34	MF													→			20	^{22(3)}	^{3}				→
(Angola)	Anastácio Costa	Anastácio Manuel da Costa	30	DF			2013	29	→																	
(Argentina)	Ávalos	Fernando Horacio Ávalos	37	MF				13	13	13																
(Angola)	Avex	Avelino Eduardo António Craque	29	MF		→	2013																			
(Angola)	Baby	Valdemar Denso António	27	MF													7	^{10(4)}	^{0}							→
(Angola)	Balú	Fábio Vieira Amaro	28	DF			2013																			
(Angola)	Barese	Afonso Pedro		MF						3																
(Angola)	Bebé	Odimir Abreu Gabriel Breganha	25	DF	2011	→																				
(Angola)	Belito Socola	Abelardo Gomes Socola	24	MF													→			7	^{3(7)}	^{2}				→
(Angola)	Benvindo Regresso	Benvindo Regresso Pontes Garcia	29	MF	2011	2012	2013	11	11	→																
(Cameroon)	Berna	Nyam Bernard	21	DF							24	^{8(1)}	^{0}													
(Angola)	Betinho Tomás	Bento Nelson V. Tomás	23	MF							8	^{1}	^{0}													
(Brazil)	Billy	Wellington Rodrigo Viana de Almeida	33	FW													→			21	^{1(1)}	^{0}				→
(Angola)	Borges, Cláudio	Cláudio Ricardo Cunha Borges	35	DF							4	^{11}	^{0}	4	^{2(1)}	^{0}										
(Angola)	Bota	Miguel João Canhanga	33	MF		→	2013	→																		
(Angola)	Breco	Pedro dos Santos António	30	MF	2011	→			–																	
(Angola)	Buanza	Bruno Miguel de Miranda	28	DF		2012	2013	21																		
(Angola)	Bumba	Pedro António da Costa	25		2011	→																				
(Angola)	Cabibi Abreu	Mário Rui de Abreu	28	MF							→			14	^{11(2)}	^{0}	14	^{15(11)}	^{0}							
(Portugal)	Capela	Fernando Jorge Barbosa Martins	29	MF					6																	
(Angola)	Capita	Evanildo de Jesus Pedro	29	FW							→			15	^{1}	^{0}										
(Angola)	Capuco	Emanuel José Paulo João	28	DF			→	7	→																	
(Angola)	Careca	Nanizawo Jacques António	30	DF										20	^{11}	^{5}	23	^{6}	^{1}	→						
(Angola)	Carlitos Almeida	Carlos Miguel Gomes de Almeida	30	DF							→			27	^{10(1)}	^{0}										
(Angola)	Carlitos Victor	João Pedro Victor	23	GK					1																	
(Angola)	Castro Cuambi	Manuel de Castro Masiala Cuambi	28	MF				→	8	→																
(Angola)	Cedric	Domingos Nzolamesso		FW						→	19	^{(3)}	^{0}													
(Angola)	Chara Costa	Fernando Agostinho da Costa	37	MF							→			8	^{7}	^{0}										
(Angola)	Chico Bunga	Carlos Francisco Diassonama Panzo Bunga	28	MF							→			11	^{17(8)}	^{6}	11	^{29(2)}	^{13}	→						
(Angola)	Chico Burica	Francisco José Neves Burica	28	DF	2011	2012																				
(Angola)	Chole	Belchior Nejó Manhinhita José	–	FW	2011	2012	2013	18	9	→	19	^{5(8)}	^{3}	9	^{3(11)}	^{1}	9	^{1(7)}	^{0}	9	^{1(1)}	^{0}	↑			
(Angola)	Chonene	João Augusto Afonso	21	DF			2013	2	2	→																
(Angola)	Cristiano			GK													1	^{DNP}								
(Angola)	Da Banda	Felisberto Sebastião Dala	–	MF						27	17	^{20(3)}	^{2}	17	^{4(7)}	^{0}	17	^{1(5)}	^{1}	17	^{15(3)}	^{7}	↑			
(Angola)	Dadão Domingos	Osvaldo Marinho Domingos	34	DF	→	2012	→	6	→																	
(Angola)	Dadão Pedro	Manuel Nzagi Pedro	26	GK						→	12	^{28}	^{0}	1	^{6}	^{0}	→									
(Cape Verde)	Dany Ribeiro	Dany Mendes Ribeiro	29	FW							25	^{4(4)}	^{0}													
(Angola)	Dani			MF							25	^{1}	^{0}													
(Brazil)	Danilo	Danilo Aparecido dos Santos	24	FW	→	2012																				
(Brazil)	David Oliveira	David Italo Fernandes de Oliveira	25	DF													→			19	^{(5)}	^{0}				
(Angola)	Dax Zage	António Hilário Dembo Zage		MF										15	^{2(3)}	^{0}	15	^{5(2)}	^{0}	15	^{(3)}	^{0}				→
(Angola)	Debele	Edgar Elias Hebo Kissanga	25	DF		→	2013	→																		
(Cape Verde)	Denis Morais	Denis Cunha Morais	24	DF				4	4																	
(France)	Diawara	Mamadou Diawara	29	FW							→			20	^{12(2)}	^{2}										
(Angola)	Dino António	Florentino de Sousa António	24	DF						→	3	^{DNP}		→												
(Angola)	Djamini	Francisco Domingos João	30	MF										→			10	^{18(7)}	^{1}	10	^{3(5)}	^{0}				→
(Namibia)	Djo	Johannes Gabriel Dumisa Jantse	34	MF	→	2012	2013	28	28	28	28	^{14(7)}	^{1}													
(Democratic Republic of the Congo)	Dr. Lami	Lami Yakini Thili	38	MF													→			13	^{8(3)}	^{2}				→
(Cameroon)	Edgard	Edgard Arnaud Afane	20	MF	→	2012																				
(Angola)	Edson Gunza	João José da Silva Gunza	26	DF	2011	2012																				
(Angola)	Eduardo Pedro	Eduardo Pereira Pedro	25	DF	2011																					
(Cameroon)	Edy Boyom	Edward Nicolas M'Boyom	31	DF													29	^{9}	^{1}							
(Brazil)	Edy Martins	Hélder Nilton Júlio Martins	21	FW	2011	2012																				
(Angola)	Enoque Guilherme	Enoque Paulo Guilherme	28	DF					5																	
(Democratic Republic of the Congo)	Eric Bokanga	Eric Bokanga Musau	29	FW										7	^{9}	^{1}										
(Angola)	Estevão Ferreira	Estevão Nassoma Ferreira	–	MF													→			11	^{16(4)}	^{1}	↑			
(Cameroon)	Etah	Michael Ntui Etah	33	DF						→	7	^{27}	^{0}													
(Brazil)	Everton	Everton de Oliveira Silva	26	MF	2011	→																				
(Angola)	Fabrício Mafuta	Fabrício Mafuta	–	DF													→			4	^{27}	^{1}	↑			
(Angola)	Fani	José Afonso dos Santos Fernando	29	GK													→			1	^{DNP}					→
(Angola)	Feliciano Tchissapa	Feliciano Domingos Tchissapa		GK						1	→															
(Angola)	Filipe Malanda	Filipe João Malanda	25	MF										5	^{12}	^{2}	→									
(Angola)	Filipe Tchitungo	Filipe Tomás João Tchitungo	23	MF													→			23	^{7}	^{0}				→
(Angola)	Gaca	João Sebastião Figueira Gaca	28	DF													→			2	^{8(3)}	^{0}				→
(Angola)	Gazeta	Pedro Malunduma Maienga	28	MF							→			18	^{8(10)}	^{1}	18	^{22(3)}	^{4}	18	^{25}	^{6}				→
(Angola)	Ge	Gelson Laureano da S. Teles		DF										8	^{5(1)}	^{0}	8	^{11(6)}	^{0}							
(Angola)	Germano Fumela	Germano Augusto Fumela	23	MF													→			25	^{8(6)}	^{0}				→
(Angola)	Germano Luís	Germano Camuege Luís	31	MF										→			2	^{7(5)}	^{1}							
(Brazil)	Geziel	Geziel Pereira Chimendes	35	GK	2011																					
(Angola)	Gomito Fonseca	Nelson Sumbo Fonseca	29	DF										→						3	^{(2)}	^{0}				
(Angola)	Grau	Diogo José Mateus Pascoal	31	DF	→	2012																				
(Angola)	Gui Matos	Manuel Porfírio Pompílio de Matos	25	MF							→			6	^{1(3)}	^{1}	→									
(Angola)	Guilherme Garcia	Sebastião Guilherme Garcia	29	GK			→	12	→																	
(Angola)	Honoro	Honoro Jorge Cabanga	29	MF				30																		
(Angola)	Igor Nascimento	Mbanino Igor Samu Nascimento	28	DF	2011	→																				
(Angola)	Ikuma	Ikuma Elenga Gildas	25	DF				24	24	24																
(Cameroon)	Jean-Claude Amougou	Jean-Claude Amougou	26	MF							8	^{14}	^{1}													
(Brazil)	Jeferson	Jeferson Miguel da Silva	32	DF							→			5	^{13}	^{0}										
(Angola)	Jó Paciência	Joaquim Cristóvão Paciência	21	FW							9	^{13(6)}	^{2}	→												
(Angola)	João Martins	João Pedro Pinto Martins	32	FW			→	17																		
(Angola)	Joca Palana	Osvaldo Jacob Chitumba Palana	27	FW		2012	2013	20	20																	
(Angola)	Joel Mpongo	Joel Pedro Mpongo	39	MF			2013	23	23																	
(Brazil)	Jorginho	Jorge Vinicius Oliveira Alves	26	FW		2012	2013	26	→																	
(Mozambique)	Josemar	Josemar Tiago Machaísse	31	MF				25	25		25	^{6(2)}	^{0}													
(Angola)	Jú Cassangali	Júbilo Jesus Noé Cassangali	19	MF							18	^{2(2)}	^{0}	21	^{DNP}		→									
(Angola)	Kikí	Garcia Afonso André	28	GK	2011	→																				
(Angola)	Kilombo Clemente	Paulino Joaquim Clemente	29	MF						→	26	^{2(3)}	^{0}													
(Angola)	Kiloy	Junqueira Jacinto Dala	25	DF					14	→	→			26	^{4(6)}	^{0}	26	^{4(3)}	^{0}	→						
(Democratic Republic of the Congo)	Kizamba	Alain Muana Kizamba	35	GK		→	2013	→	12																	
(Portugal)	Lameirão	Edgar Manuel Abreu Lameirão Baptista	33	DF		→	2013	→																		
(Angola)	Lami Panzo	Windua Pedro Cisaca Panzo		GK						–	1	^{DNP}														
(Angola)	Lami Zinga	Guilherme Zinga		GK	→	2012				–																
(Angola)	Landu	Landu Mavanga	30	GK													→			22	^{21}	^{0}				→
(Brazil)	Leandro Cerqueira	Leandro França Cerqueira	27	MF							11	^{1(2)}	^{0}													
(Brazil)	Leandro Silva	Leandro Sena da Silva	24	MF	2011	2012	→																			
(Angola)	Lelo Barros	José Lelo Sevo Barros	35	DF	→	2012	2013	27	27	2	27	^{11(4)}	^{0}	→												
(Angola)	Lito Kapunge	Evaristo Daniel Kapunge	22	MF							→			13	^{20(2)}	^{0}										
(Angola)	Lizandro	Lizandro Octávio Simão João	20	MF										27	^{2(1)}	^{0}	27	^{2}	^{0}							
(Angola)	Lourenço Adriano	Lourenço Cambiombo Sapalo Adriano	–	DF						→	13	^{1(1)}	^{0}				→			8	^{16(7)}	^{0}	↑			
(Brazil)	Luciano Câmara	Luciano Carlos Marques Câmara	28	FW						11	→															
(Angola)	Luís Cláudio	Luís Cláudio Sebastião de Melo	27	MF	2011	→																				
(Cameroon)	Madola	Pius Madola	25	MF							29	^{5(1)}	^{2}													
(Republic of the Congo)	Madzou	Madzou Tsoumou Tholf Fauriez		DF													4	^{14}	^{0}							
(Angola)	Manucho Mukuma	Borges Faustino Mukuma	21	GK			2013	31	→																	
(Angola)	Marcelo Dias	Marcelo Alexandre Dias de Assunção	29	MF	2011	2012	2013			20	10	^{3(7)}	^{0}													
(Angola)	Mário Hipólito	Mário Damião Hipólito	29	GK				1	→																	
(Brazil)	Marlon Brandão	Marlon Augusto Brandão	32	FW	2011	→																				
(Angola)	Massudi	Antunes Francisco Soares	26	MF	→	2012	→																			
(Angola)	Mauro Simão	Suarez Mauro Simão	24	MF	2011																					
(Angola)	Mayungo	Jacinto Bernardo Machado	–	DF										2	^{DNP}		13	^{2}	^{0}	26	^{11}	^{1}		↑		
(Angola)	Mboma			FW						9																
(Angola)	Mig	Zacarias dos Milagres Sambambi	26	GK							→			22	^{21}	^{0}	22	^{15}	^{0}	→						
(Angola)	Miguel Bengui	Miguel Pedro Bengui	24	FW													→			27	^{5(5)}	^{1}				→
(Angola)	Miguel Matinungina	Miguel Mateus Matinungina	27	MF	2011																					
(Angola)	Milex	Lúvia João Mateus	33	MF			→	3	→	→	3	^{8(2)}	^{1}													
(Angola)	Mingo Ngola	Osvaldo António Ngunza Ngola	32	FW	2011	→																				
(Angola)	Minguito Fernandes	Domingos dos Santos Fernandes	30	MF		→	2013	→																		
(Mozambique)	Miro Lobo	Almiro Edson Daniel Lobo	38	DF				16	16	→	16	^{26}	^{1}	16	^{28}	^{0}	16	^{25(3)}	^{0}	16	^{15(3)}	^{1}				→
(Angola)	Miro Pereira	Belmiro da Conceição Pereira	29	DF	→	2012	→																			
(Angola)	Moche	Moche Iyeti	36	GK	2011	2012																				
(Angola)	Moco	Bruno Baptista Tolombua Fernando	28	FW										→			19	^{4(2)}	^{1}							
(Angola)	Monteiro									–																
(Angola)	Muandumba	Paulo Manuel Muandumba	32	MF				8																		
(Angola)	Mussumari	Gamaliel Frederico Mussumari	–	DF										→			30	^{23(2)}	^{2}	30	^{25(2)}	^{3}	↑			
(Angola)	Nando Caquinta	Fernando Lourenço da Silva Caquinta	34	DF	2011																					
(Angola)	Nani	Sebastião Quionga Luvualo	28	DF						→	2	^{6(1)}	^{0}	→												
(Angola)	Ndó	António Nenuele Nelo	27	MF			2013	→																		
(Angola)	Nilton Monteiro	Domingos Nílton Monteiro		MF						17	→															
(Angola)	Nuno Santana	José Eduardo de Azevedo Santana	27	MF	2011																					
(Portugal)	Oliveira, António	António Manuel da Silva Oliveira	29	MF			2013	→																		
(Angola)	Osvaldo Zau	Frederico B.M. Zau		MF										→			3	^{2(2)}	^{0}							
(Angola)	Paizinho Calenga	Hercânio Chitaca Calenga	30	FW			2013	→																		
(Angola)	Paizinho Ncuendi	Venâncio Amadeu da Silva Ncuendi	22	MF					21		11	^{3(5)}	^{0}													
(Angola)	Palucho	Paulo Pereira da Silva	28	MF										7	^{5(4)}	^{0}	→									
(Angola)	Pataca	Bernardo Fernando Pataca da Silva	27	MF						→	6	^{25(1)}	^{6}	→												
(Democratic Republic of the Congo)	Patrick Anfumu	Patrick Lembo Anfumu	26	FW	→	2012	→																			
(Angola)	Patrick Moniz	Tadi Nsuadi Moniz	32	DF					3																	
(Angola)	Pick Serrote	Artur Francisco Serrote		MF						8	→															
(Angola)	Pitshu	Tubi Landu	35	GK	→	2012	2013	22	22																	
(Angola)	Prazeres	Prazeres Chijica Dala		DF					6	6																
(Angola)	Quinzinho Nzamba	Joaquim André Nzamba	34	MF				→	15	→	15	^{10(4)}	^{0}													
(Angola)	Rafael Magalhães	Rafael da Silva Magalhães	21	DF	2011																					
(Angola)	Rasca	Maieco Domingos Henrique António	33	FW				→	29	→																
(Nicaragua)	Raúl Ávila	Raúl Moisés Leguías Ávila	31	FW	→	2012	→																			
(Democratic Republic of the Congo)	Raúl Koko	Raul Kidumu Koko		MF	2011	2012																				
(Democratic Republic of the Congo)	Reginó	Mukendi Mbyia Regino	28	DF							→			19	^{22(2)}	^{1}	20	^{20(2)}	^{1}	→						
(Angola)	Rochaná	Panda Marcelo José	27	GK						→	22	^{DNP}		→												
(Republic of the Congo)	Ruud	Ruud Eufrey Mesmin Bocko	23	GK													1	^{DNP}								
(Tanzania)	Said	Said Maulid Kalukula	28	FW	2011	2012	→																			
(Angola)	Santana Carlos	José da Silva Santana Carlos					2013																			
(Angola)	Sapalo Macossa	Luciano Sapalo Macossa	20						18																	
(Ivory Coast)	Savané	Savane Aly Touré	28	MF										10	^{8(3)}	^{0}	→									
(Angola)	Sávio	Paulino Vasco Macuva		DF						23	21	^{6(1)}	^{0}	→												
(Angola)	Sekeseke									4																
(Angola)	Sérgio Matusimua	Sérgio António Matusimua	32	DF	→	2012	→																			
(Democratic Republic of the Congo)	Shayi	Mukengeshayi Tumba	26	FW		2012	→	9	→																	
(São Tomé and Príncipe)	Silva, Ludgério	Ludgério Silva	29	MF				30	30																	
(Angola)	Sílvio Assete	Silvino Valdemar da Silva Assete	23	DF		2012	2013	19	19	→																
(Mozambique)	Sonito	Apson Manjate	30	MF				14	14																	
(Angola)	Sotto †	António Virgílio Sotto-Mayor	30	MF	2011	→																				
(Angola)	Tchingane	Frederico Baioca M. Zau		DF													3	^{5}	^{0}	→						
(Angola)	Tião	Sebastião Félix Pereira de Carvalho	32	DF	2011	2012	→																			
(Angola)	Totó	Osvaldo Cornélio Paulo Candeia	29	MF	2011	⋅	2013	→																		
(Democratic Republic of the Congo)	Tsherry	Thierry Bolongo Ebengi	36	GK		→	2013	–																		
(Democratic Republic of the Congo)	Tshukuma	Mboyo Itoko Jean Claude	32	MF						14																
(Angola)	Vadinho	Osvaldo Benedito Pinheiro	–	MF						25	14	^{2(4)}	^{0}				29	^{2(2)}	^{0}	29	^{1(2)}	^{0}	↑			
(Angola)	Vado Dias	Dorivaldo António Dias	31	MF										29	^{1(3)}	^{0}	→									
(Angola)	Vado Jorge	Osvaldo Fernando Jorge	24	MF	2011																					
(Angola)	Vado Kitenga	Osvaldo Pedro de Jesus Kitenga	25	DF						→	23	^{21(2)}	^{0}	23	^{12}	^{1}	→									
(Angola)	Vado Lelis	Valdemar Teófilo Laurindo Lelis	28	FW						20	20	^{5(1)}	^{0}													
(Angola)	Vado Miguel	Osvaldo Adão Campos Miguel	24	DF													→			14	^{13(5)}	^{0}				→
(Cape Verde)	Valter	Valter Gazalanas Borges	28	MF				15		–																
(São Tomé and Príncipe)	Vander	Vander Ramos Pinto	27	MF										→			7	^{1(4)}	^{0}							
(Angola)	Victor Sangui	Victor Ambrósio Sangui	20	DF	2011																					
(Brazil)	Wheels	Wheels Nicolau da Silva	23	DF	2011																					
(Angola)	Wiwí	Arão Manuel Lologi	–	DF										→			5	^{28}	^{0}	5	^{25}	^{3}	↑			
(Angola)	Yuri Dala	Yuri Mabi Dala	36	DF					→	5	5	^{14(1)}	^{0}				19	^{4(2)}	^{0}							
(Angola)	Zé Panzo	José Panzo Afonso	22	DF										28	^{21(3)}	^{1}	28	^{25(1)}	^{0}	28	^{24(2)}	^{0}				→
(Angola)	Zé Kalanga	Paulo Baptista Nsimba	32	MF			2013	10	10																	
(Angola)	Zeca Macosso	Maurício Dembe Macosso	31	MF							→			25	^{21}	^{1}	25	^{22(3)}	^{1}	→						
Years					2011	2012	2013	2014	2015	2016	2017			2018			2018–19		27	2019–20		57				

== 2001–2010 ==
FC Bravos do Maquis 2001–2010

Nat	Nick	Name	A	P	J.P.	–	J.P.	S.S.	K. Ribeiro		J. C. Kenzo		–	A.P.	
Nat	Nick	Name	A	P	2001	2002	2003	2004	2005	2006	2007	2008	2009	2010	
Nat	Nick	Name	A	P	13	2c	1c	14	1c	12	1b	11	10	5	
(Angola)	Abel							2004							
(Angola)	Aílton	Sebastião Patrício Micolo								2006	→				
(Angola)	Arsénio Manuel	Arsénio Bartolomeu Manuel	20	MF									2009	2010	
(Zambia)	Banda	Nephias Banda		FW									→	2010	
(Angola)	Bebé Breganha	Odimir Abreu Gabriel Breganha	–	MF									→	2010	↑
(Angola)	Benguela	António Cajambala Manuel		MF							→	2008	2009		
(Angola)	Benvindo Regresso	Benvindo Regresso Pontes Garcia	–	MF						2006		2008	→	2010	→
(Angola)	Betinho Ilunga	Nelson Milione Ilunga		DF				2004	→	2006	2007				
(Angola)	Breco	Pedro dos Santos António	–	MF								2008	2009	2010	↑
(Angola)	Bruno												2009		
(Angola)	Careca	Nanizawo Jacque António	–	FW								→	2009		↑
(Angola)	Castro Cuambi	Manuel de Castro Masiala Cuambi	–	FW							2007	2008	2009	2010	→
(Angola)	Chico Burica	Francisco José Neves Burica	–	DF						2006	2007	2008	2009	2010	↑
(Angola)	Chole	Belchior Nejó Manhinhita José	–	FW									2009	2010	↑
(Angola)	Chora Ginga	Fernando Quitanda Ginga	23	DF								2008	2009	2010	→
(Angola)	Costa													2010	
(Angola)	Dadão Domingos	Osvaldo Marinho Domingos	–	MF								→	2009	2010	
(Angola)	Dito			MF					2005	2006					
(Angola)	Dodó			FW								2008			
(Angola)	Edson Gunza	João José da Silva Gunza	–	DF					2005	2006	2007	2008	2009	2010	↑
(Angola)	Elie										2007	2008			
(Angola)	Elson	Elson de Sousa Augusto		MF						2006					
(Angola)	Emanuel							2004							
(Angola)	Escurinho Gomes	Abraão Jacinto Gomes		MF				2004	→						
(Angola)	Etumba	Nelson Milione Ilunga									2007	2008			
(Brazil)	Everton	Everton de Oliveira Silva	–	MF										2010	↑
(Angola)	Filipe			GK				2004							
(Angola)	Godó										2007	2008			
(Angola)	Heidinho †	Heidi Jorge de Oliveira	25							2006	2007	→			
(Angola)	Hélder Cabral	Hélder Figueiredo da Silva Cabral	30	GK										2010	
(Angola)	Hélder									2006					
(Angola)	Hélder II							2004							
(Angola)	Hervé							2004							
(Angola)	Igor Nascimento	Mbanino Igor Samu Nascimento	–	FW									2009	2010	↑
(Angola)	Jaime							2004							
(Angola)	Jerico						2003								
(Angola)	Jonico	Jonico Catumbela Silva		DF				2004	→						
(Democratic Republic of the Congo)	Kanu	Patrick Kanu Mbiyavanga	21	MF										2010	
(Angola)	Karo								2005						
(Angola)	Kialunda	João Vienga Kialenda	22	DF								2008	→		
(Angola)	Kikas							2004							
(Angola)	Kikí	Garcia Afonso André	–	GK									→	2010	↑
(Angola)	Kilú	Gilberto Cristóvão Francisco	26	GK								→	2009		
(Angola)	Kissa							2004	→						
(Togo)	Kodjo	Tossou Kodjo David	24								2007	2008	→		
(Angola)	Lami												2009		
(Angola)	Laurentino	Laurentino Jerónimo Fernandes da Cruz	33	GK									→	2010	→
(Brazil)	Leandro Silva	Leandro Sena da Silva	–	MF										2010	↑
(Angola)	Lutucuta Silva	Adilson Francisco da Silva						2004							
(Angola)	Malick										2007				
(Angola)	Malone	Narciso Jorge Bilanda						2004	→						
(Angola)	Manaja	Gilberto Armindo Canje		DF				2004		2006		→	2009	2010	
(Angola)	Maninho											2008			
(Angola)	Manucho									2006					
(Angola)	Marcelo Assunção	Marcelo Alexandre Dias de Assunção	–	MF										2010	↑
(Angola)	Marco Aurélio	Marco Aurélio		DF									2009		
(Angola)	Mariano Júlio	Mariano Júlio		FW			2003	2004							
(Brazil)	Marlon Brandão	Marlon Augusto Brandão	–	FW								→	2009	2010	↑
(Democratic Republic of the Congo)	Massaro	Mabundu Makumona Phillippe		FW						2006	2007	2008	2009		
(Angola)	Mateus Chissingui	Mateus Latim Chissingui	25	MF										2010	
(Angola)	Mauro Gomes	Manuel Lourenço Gomes		FW						2006	→	2008	→		
(Angola)	Mbito			DF					2005	2006	2007	2008			
(Angola)	Mezinho							2004							
(Angola)	Micha	Domingos Famoroso Ribeiro		MF							→	2008			
(Angola)	Michel Domingos	Miguel Gilberto Manuel Domingos		DF					→	2006	2007	2008			
(Angola)	Milocas	António Fernandes dos Santos							→	2006					
(Angola)	Mingão			DF				2004							
(Angola)	Mingo Sanda	Domingos Fernando Sanda	26	DF					→	2006	→	2008	→		
(Angola)	Miranda			MF					→	2006					
(Angola)	Moche	Moche Iyeti	–	GK						→	2007	2008	2009	2010	↑
(Zambia)	Mukota	Ignatius Mukota	26	FW					→	2006	2007	2008	2009	→	
(Angola)	Mungusso	José Kadima Mungusso	30	FW									→	2010	
(Angola)	Nandinho Macamo	Wilson Fernandes Augusto Macamo	23	MF					→	2006	2007	2008	→		
(Angola)	Nando			GK									2009		
(Angola)	Nando Caquinta	Fernando Lourenço da Silva Caquinta	–	DF								→	2009	2010	↑
(Angola)	Neco			DF								2008			
(Angola)	Nelson Chiminha	Francis Nelson Chiminha	25						2005	2006					
(Angola)	Nené								2005						
(Angola)	Neruda	Stélvio de Assis Vieira de Olim		MF									→	2010	→
(Angola)	Netinho	Sebastião Egídio Mateus		DF								2008	2009	→	
(Angola)	Orlando							2004							
(Angola)	Paíto Kamutali	António Katiavala Kamutali	27	MF								→	2009		
(Angola)	Paulito Fuxe	Paulo Quental Fuxe	29	DF					→	2006	2007	2008	→		
(Angola)	Pingo	Mateus João Francisco Bravo	24	DF								→	2009	→	
(Angola)	Quinzinho Nzamba	Joaquim André Nzamba	–	MF							→	2008	2009	→	
(Angola)	Rafael	Rafael da Silva Magalhães	–	DF										2010	↑
(Angola)	Ribeiro										2007				
(Angola)	Rogério	Rogério da Conceição Rodrigues		GK						2006	2007	2008	2009		
(Tanzania)	Said	Said Maulid Kalukula	–	FW							→	2008	2009	2010	↑
(Angola)	Simão							2004							
(Angola)	Sotto	António Virgílio Sotto-Mayor	–	MF									→	2010	↑
(Angola)	Stanick Domingos	Caetano Manuel Domingos	–	FW							2007		2009		
(Angola)	Stroga						2003								
(Democratic Republic of the Congo)	Taifan	Ngoie Taifan	36	GK				2004		2006	2007				
(Angola)	Tanda							2004							
(Angola)	Tatacho			GK			→	2004							
(Angola)	Tetembua	Tetembua Quirino d’Almeida Neto							→	2006					
(Angola)	Tião	Sebastião Félix Pereira de Carvalho	–	DF										2010	↑
(Angola)	Vado Ferreira	Jaime Walter de Jesus Tavares Ferreira		DF									2009		
(Brazil)	William Pires	William da Silva Pires	19	FW									→	2010	
(Angola)	Zapa										2007				
(Angola)	Zé Maria							2004							
Years					2001	2002	2003	2004	2005	2006	2007	2008	2009	2010	

== See also ==
- Category:F.C. Bravos do Maquis players
