= List of Domant FC players =

Domant Futebol Clube de Bula Atumba is an Angolan football (soccer) club based in Caxito, Angola and plays at Estádio Municipal do Dande. The club was established in 2005.

== 2010–2019 ==
Domant FC players 2010–2019

Nat	#	Nick	Name	A	P	M.C. Loras		P.S.	–	P.S.	M.O.*	M.O.	F.P.A.	Pedro Manuel			G.M.	–
Nat	#	Nick	Name	A	P	2010	2011	2012	DNE	2014	2015	2016	2017	2018 (14th)			2019	2020
Nat	#	Nick	Name	A	P	2_{a}	4_{a}	2_{a}	–	1_{a}	16	3_{a}	1_{a}	^{#}	^{A}	^{G}	^{#}	^{#}
(Angola)		Abegá	Manuel Adriano Canjila		FW			2012		–								
(Angola)		Abel Lukango	Abel Muamba	22	FW						25		25	→				
(Angola)		Abel Manfuila	Abel Makiade Manfuila	26	MF						10							
(Angola)		Alex	Alex Kahembe		GK			2012		1	1	1	1	1	^{13}			
(Angola)		Amoroso	Belarmino Capenda Cassange		MF		2011	2012		–		10						
(Angola)	–	André															–	
(Angola)		Angelino	Angelino Camilo Eduardo		FW								27	16	^{15(3)}	^{1}		
(Angola)		Anita	Paulo M. Rodrigues Rosa		FW						→	11						
(Angola)		Ayala	Mário Agostinho	27	MF			2012		11	11	→						
(Angola)		Bakig	Júlio dos Santos		FW							16						
(Angola)		Barese	Afonso Pedro		MF					→	–							
(Angola)	–	Basta	Joaquim D. Sebastião Adão		DF			2012			5	5	5	5	^{13(1)}	^{1}	–	
(Angola)		Beli					2011											
(Angola)		Beu	Orfeu Francisco Manuel Neto		MF			2012		23		23						
(Angola)		Bijú	António Filho									–						
(Angola)		Binga						2012										
(Angola)		Boss	Joaquim José Candiza		DF									26	^{14}		–	→
(Angola)		Cabetula	Sabalo José Kilulo Ingo		DF		2011	2012		28	28	28		18	^{4}			
(Angola)		Cabibi I	Leonardo Manuel Isola Ramos	26	MF					17	17	→	→	10	^{25(2)}	^{3}	→	
(Angola)		Cabibi II	Mário Rui de Abreu	24	MF					→	13	→						
(Angola)		Cadi				–	2011											
(Angola)		Cebola	Pedro C. Cupendela Domingos		FW					–		25	–	→				
(Angola)		Celi	Celestino Simão da Silva											17	^{(2)}			
(Angola)	7	Cuxixima	Domingos Lourenço Francisco Cuxixima	23	FW												7	
(Angola)	4	Dadá			DF								4	4	^{1}		4	
(Angola)		Dadão Bile	Adão Francisco Congo Zalata	24	MF						8	→		7	^{2(4)}		→	
(Angola)		David	David Dinis Magalhães	33	FW						29							
(Angola)		Dax	António Hilário Dembo Zage		MF								→	14	^{2(4)}	^{2}		
(Angola)		Defesa	Diassonama Defesa Pedro		GK									12	^{9}		→	
(Angola)		Depaiza	Estevão Manuel Quitocota Cahoco	24	DF		2011	2012	→									
(Angola)		Derrete			FW					–								
(Angola)		Devigor	Valdo Euclides da Costa	38	FW					20	20							
(Angola)		Dewiwi			MF					→	9							
(Angola)		Diego						2012										
(Angola)	19	Dinho												19	^{2(2)}		19	
(Angola)	6	Diogo	José Dias Diogo														6	
(Angola)		Ducharme	Ducharme Castro		DF							24						
(Angola)		Edson	Edson da Graça Calunga Praia	30	DF								→	2	^{16}		→	
(Angola)		Edú			FW					24								
(Angola)		Elizur	Yamba Elizur António João		MF								→	18	^{DNP}			
(Angola)		Estória	Sérgio António Luís	25	DF						15							
(Cape Verde)		Fufuco	António Paiva Tavares	29	FW						9							
(Angola)		Germano	Germano Diogo									–						
(Angola)		Gil Martins	Gil Martins dos Santos	31	FW		→	2012		27								
(Angola)		Giresse			FW					–								
(Angola)		Godinho			GK			2012										
(Angola)	–	Hino															–	
(Angola)		Ivo	Carlos Mbaca Calei			→	2011											
(Angola)		Izgo	Isaac Paulo Nilinga														11	→
(Angola)		Jerónimo			MF					19	19							
(Angola)		Jesus	Jesus João Capemba Gouveia		GK						22							
(Angola)		Joãozinho								–								
(Angola)		José			GK								12					
(Angola)		Junior			DF			2012		–								
(Cape Verde)		Kaká	William Jorge M. Faial Delgado		DF						2							
(Angola)		Kilú	Gilberto Cristóvão Francisco		GK					12	12							
(Angola)		Kito Mara												21	^{DNP}			
(Angola)		Kizombé	Alberto dos Santos Domingos	24	DF					→	30	→						
(Angola)		Lami	Guilherme Zinga	30	GK						29							
(Angola)		Litão	Domingos Lito Firmino		DF						24							
(Angola)		Londaka	Mauro de Almeida Londaka	26	MF					26	26	26	6	6	^{16(3)}	^{1}	→	
(Angola)		Luís	Luís António		FW								→	29	^{5(6)}	^{1}	→	
(Angola)		Mabululu	Agostinho Cristóvão Paciência	26	FW								→	9	^{25}	^{9}	→	
(Angola)	–	Malanga	Jorge Paulo		DF								26	23	^{4(1)}		–	
(Angola)		Maninho	Leandro Mendes Van-Dúnem		MF						14							
(Angola)	–	Mano	António Joaquim Mateus		GK								→	22	^{DNP}		–	
(Angola)	–	Máquina	Gil Manuel Máquina	22	MF												–	
(Angola)		Matamba	Matamba Paulino Sousa		MF						23							
(Angola)		Mavambu	Mavambu João Afonso Baptista	22	MF									17	^{3(7)}	^{1}		
(Angola)		Meda	Vidal Miguel Paulo Nsiandamba	26	MF									14	^{11(1)}	^{1}	→	
(Angola)		Messi	Sebastião Zangui	35	MF						16							
(Angola)		Micha	Domingos Famoroso Ribeiro		DF		2011	2012										
(Angola)		Milton	Amarildo Paím										–					
(Angola)	–	Naftali	Naftali K. Pedro	28	GK						→	–					–	
(Angola)		Nanú			DF					→	27							
(Angola)		Ndinga			MF					–								
(Angola)		Neco					2011											
(Angola)	–	Negra	Juremo Filipe Gonçalves	29	MF			2012		6	6	6	→	15	^{13}		–	
(Angola)		Nelo											14	–	^{(2)}			
(Angola)		Neymar	Carlos Paulo Lomanda José		FW							14						
(Angola)		Nsimba			MF								11	15	^{(2)}			
(Angola)		Orlando	Valdemar João		MF							19	19					
(Angola)		Patrick			GK									1	^{2}			
(Angola)		Patrick	Patrício Paulo Alberto		DF		2011					15	13	13	^{26}	^{1}	→	
(Angola)		Paulito	Paulo Valentim Ucuahamba Gonga		MF					→	4	4						
(Angola)		Peladão											30					
(Angola)		Quadrado	Stênio Simão		FW							–						
(Angola)		Quinito	Joaquim Marcos Cunga Balanga	20	DF									24	^{17}		→	
(Angola)		Reginaldo					2011			–								
(Angola)		Richie	Pedro Lundoloki		MF									25	^{9(4)}	^{2}	→	
(Angola)	14	Sadam															14	
(Angola)	–	Sávio	Paulino Vasco Macuva		DF									→			–	
(Angola)		Sigui	Figueira Chitumbi Muguinda		MF		2011	2012		21	21	21	20	20	^{15(3)}			
(Angola)		Solange	Francisco João Joaquim		MF					18	18							
(Angola)	–	Sukuia															–	
(Angola)		Suruba			MF					–								
(Angola)		Ti Yano					2011	2012										
(Angola)		Tokalá	Adão João Domingos		GK							–						
(Angola)		Tunu			GK		2011			–								
(Angola)		Txebe	Fernando António Txebe	30	DF					3	3							
(Angola)		Vado	Osvaldo Adão Campos Miguel		MF							–	–					
(Angola)		Vavá											19					
(Angola)		Victor	Victor J.C. Banco		GK								–	30	^{5}			
(Angola)		Vitó						2012										
(Angola)		Yamba Asha	João Osvaldo Yamba Asha	39	DF						15							
(Angola)		Zaipa	João Canga de Gouveia Leite	26	MF			2012			7							
(Angola)		Zé	Josué dos Anjos Romeu Trindade		DF		2011				27	→						
(Angola)	8	Zema	José Cassule Manuel		MF								18	8	^{18(8)}		8	
(Angola)		Zezão	José Francisco Gomes		DF					15	→							
(Angola)		Zezas	Carlos Guimarães Gomes		DF							3	3	3	^{20(1)}		→	
(Angola)		Zico											–					
(Angola)		Zito									–							
(Angola)		Zizí	Isidro de Oliveira André Manuel	23	MF								→	11	^{3(9)}	^{1}	→	
Years						2010	2011	2012	2013	2014	2015	2016	2017	2018			2019	2020

- Manuel Oliveira replaced Juan Oliva who had replaced Paulo Saraiva
