= List of Progresso da Lunda Sul players =

This article a list of Progresso da Lunda Sul players. Progresso da Lunda Sul is an Angolan association football (soccer) club based in Saurimo, and plays at the Estádio das Mangueiras. The club was established in 2002.

== 2014–2018 ==
Progresso da Lunda Sul players 2014–2018

Nat	#	Nick	Name	A	P	Kito Ribeiro			A. César			–
Nat	#	Nick	Name	A	P	2014	2015	2016	2017			2018
Nat	#	Nick	Name	A	P	1	6	4	^{#}	^{A}	^{G}	–
(Angola)		Abel Lukango	Abel Muamba	23				11				
(Democratic Republic of the Congo)		Agoya	Augusto Makanja	27	MF	9	9	9	25	^{8(4)}	^{1}	
(Angola)		Alvaro	Álvaro Sunga Tatala	31	FW	23	23					
(Angola)		Anderson			DF			→	5	^{5(1)}	^{0}	
(Democratic Republic of the Congo)		Atunako	Eboue Manzambi Atunako		MF			23				
(Senegal)		Babacar	Babacar Fall	29	DF	5	5	→				
(Angola)		Badrick	Badrick Paulo Madadi	27	GK	1	1	1	→			
(Angola)		Balotelli				2						
(Angola)		Barrezó	Joveth Adão	24	DF	21	21	21	21	^{15}	^{2}	→
(Angola)		Bebé	Odimir Abreu Gabriel Breganha	31	MF			→	6	^{3(2)}	^{0}	
(Angola)		Bodunha	Mbunga Zola	32	DF		→	5	5	^{9(1)}	^{0}	
(Democratic Republic of the Congo)		Botayi	Pierre Botayi	22	MF		18	→				
(Angola)		Cabibi II	Mário Rui de Abreu	26	MF			→	8	^{14(5)}	^{2}	→
(Angola)		Capuco	Emanuel José Paulo João	31	DF			→	23	^{13(3)}	^{3}	
(Angola)		Cassoma	António Hélder Miranda Cassoma	31	DF		5					
(Angola)		Chico Bel		27	MF	6	6	6				
(Zambia)		Chileshe	Jackson Chileshe Chibwe Yokoniya	33	MF	→	10	10	10	^{23}	^{7}	
(Angola)		David	David Dinis Magalhães	35	FW			→	9	^{7(10)}	^{7}	
(Angola)		Didí	Edgar Alberto Capemba	26		→	8					
(Angola)		Dié	Bulay João Domingos Kiala	24	GK			→	1	^{3}	^{0}	
(Portugal)		Diogo Rosado	Diogo Jorge Rosado	26	FW		→	27	→			
(Angola)		Dji						30				
(Angola)		Edson							14	^{(3)}	^{0}	
(Angola)		Feião	Moisés Sebastião Cabungula	26		→	14	14	14	^{1(5)}	^{0}	
(Angola)		Fuky	Manuel Paulo David	25	MF			→	11	^{4(2)}	^{0}	→
(Angola)		Garcia							28	^{1(2)}	^{0}	
(Angola)		Gaúcho	Sadac Julião Daniel		MF		–	2	29	^{1(1)}	^{0}	
(Angola)		Gérard	Gérard Bakinde Bilong	25	MF			→	18	^{8}	^{0}	
(Angola)		Gria	Samuel Gria	22	MF	25	25					
(Angola)		Guilherme	Sebastião Guilherme Garcia	32	GK	→	12	12	12	^{3(1)}	^{0}	→
(Cape Verde)		Herman	Herman Delgado Sousa	23	MF	→	18					
(Democratic Republic of the Congo)		Hervé	Hervé Ndonga Mianga	24	MF	→	7	7	7	^{13(3)}	^{1}	→
(Angola)		Ismael				18						
		Jackson					–		25	^{3(1)}	^{0}	
(Burkina Faso)		Kebe	Boubacar Djeidy Kébé	29				18	18	^{2(1)}	^{0}	
(Angola)		Laúcha	Ivan Cláudio França Joanes		MF		11					
(Cameroon)		Lionel	Lionel Vera Yombi	23	MF				26	^{13(6)}	^{1}	→
(Angola)		Loló				10						
(Angola)		Lopes	Lopes Mateus Simão	28	DF	→	16	16	16	^{21(1)}	^{0}	→
(Brazil)		Luciano	Luciano Carlos Marques Câmara	27	FW	→	11					
(Angola)		Manucho				15						
(Angola)		Mauro	Mauro Alexandre da Silva Almeida	34	DF		→	25				
(Democratic Republic of the Congo)		Mayala			FW			26				
(Angola)		Mendinho	Walter Moura Mendes Tavares	27	MF		→	24	→			
(Angola)		Micki	Miguel Cipriano da Gama	34	DF		19	19	19	^{19}	^{0}	→
(Democratic Republic of the Congo)		Mongo	Kipe Mongo Lompala Bokamba		FW			15	→			
(Angola)		Naftali	Naftali K. Pedro	24	GK	22	22	→				
(Angola)		Nandinho				11						
(Angola)		Ndié	Diogo Manzambi Kembi	24	MF	20	20	20	20	^{22}	^{0}	→
(Angola)		Ndó	António Nenuele Nelo	29	MF	26	26					
(Angola)		Nick			MF	19						
(Angola)		Norberto	Kiatalua Tadeu Emous	22	MF	4	4	4	→			
(Angola)		Nzau	Nzau Miguel Lutumba	24	DF		24	→				
(Angola)		Pedro	Pedro António Carlos	22	MF	8	8					
(Angola)		Projecto	Jaime Cotingo Martinho	27	DF			→	–	^{2}	^{0}	
(Angola)		Quinzinho	Joaquim André Nzamba	33	MF		→	8	→			
(Angola)		René	Kalemba René Baltazar	23	DF		13	13	→			
(Angola)		Sténio	Sténio de Sá Miranda Simão						30	^{3(3)}	^{1}	→
(Angola)		Tchitchi	Cláudio Segunda Adão	31	MF			→	17	^{11(6)}	^{3}	→
(Democratic Republic of the Congo)		Tshibuabua	Bavon Tshibuabua	25	FW	→	17	17	→			
(Democratic Republic of the Congo)		Tshukuma	Mboyo Itoko Jean Claude	31	MF	→	15					
(Angola)		Tuga				7						
(Cape Verde)		Vally	Valdevindes Chantres Monteiro	29	DF	3	3	3	3	^{17}	^{0}	→
(Angola)		Wilson	Wilson Edgar Pereira Alegre	32	GK		→	22	22	^{19}	^{0}	→
(Angola)		Yuri							4	^{1}	^{0}	
(Angola)		Yuri	Yuri Mabi Dala	31	DF	28	28	→				
(Angola)		Zé da Bar			GK	12						
(Angola)		Zinho				14						
Years						2014	2015	2016	2017			2018
