= 2017 Segundona =

- Champions: Domant FC
- Biggest home win: Sp Cabinda 5–1 J. Garcia (24 Sep 2017)
- Biggest away win: Evale 0–3 C. Militar (23 Jul 2017)
- Highest scoring: Sp Cabinda 5–1 J. Garcia (24 Sep 2017)

The 2017 Segundona was the 23rd season of the second-tier football league in Angola. The season ran from 9 July to October 2017.

The league comprises 2 series, one 4 and the other 5 teams, the winner of each series being automatically promoted to the 2018 Girabola while the runners-up of each group will contest for the third spot. At the end of the regular season, the three series winners will play a round-robin tournament to determine the league champion.

== Stadia and locations ==
Locations of the 2017 Segundona teams

P	Team	Home city	Stadium	Capacity	2016
–	ASK Dragão	Uíge	Estádio 4 de Janeiro	12,000	DNP
–	Ajuda Social	Saurimo	Estádio das Mangueiras	7,000	DNP
–	Casa Militar	Menongue	Campo Municipal	5,000	3rd in Segundona, Gr B
–	Domant FC	Caxito	Estádio Municipal	5,000	3rd in Segundona, Gr A
–	Evale FC	Ondjiva	Estádio dos Castilhos	429	DNP
–	Jackson Garcia	Benguela	Estádio de S. Filipe	5,000	4th in Segundona, Gr B
–	Ferroviário do Huambo	Huambo	Estádio do Ferrovia	10,000	DNP
–	Vitória do Bié	Kuito	Estádio dos Eucaliptos	–	DNP
–	Sporting de Cabinda	Cabinda	Estádio do Chiazi	25,000	2nd in Segundona, Gr A

== Draw ==
Zone A	Zone B
ASK Dragão; Domant FC; FC Ajuda Social; Sporting de Cabinda	Casa Militar; Evale FC; Ferroviário do Huambo; Jackson Garcia; Vitória do Bié

All teams in each group play in a double round robin system (home and away).

== Zone A ==
=== Table and results ===
Pos	Team	Pld	W	D	L	GF	GA	GD	Pts	Qualification or relegation	DOM	SCC	ASK	AJS
1	Domant FC (C)	4	1	3	0	2	1	+1	6	Qualification for Girabola		0–0	2–1	–
2	Sporting de Cabinda	4	1	2	1	3	3	0	5	Qualification for Girabola playoff	0–0		2–1	–
3	ASK Dragão	4	1	1	2	3	5	−2	4		0–0	2–1		–
4	Ajuda Social (D)	0	0	0	0	0	0	0	0	Disqualified	–	–	–	

Updated to match(es) played on 19 June 2017. Source: Girabola.com
Rules for classification: 1) Points; 2) Head-to-head points; 3) Head-to-head goal difference; 4) Goal difference; 5) Goals scored; 6) Fair-play points; 7) Play-off.
(C) Champions; (D) Disqualified

=== Match details ===
Round 1

Sun, 09 Jul 2017	Sporting Cabinda	0–0	Domant FC	Cabinda
15:00				Stadium: Estádio do Tafe

Round 4

Sun, 20 Aug 2017	Domant FC	0–0	Sporting Cabinda	Caxito
15:00		Report		Stadium: Estádio Municipal; Referee: Avelino Chivela, Ladislau Miguel, António Miguel

Round 2

Sun, 16 Jul 2017	ASK Dragão	2–1	Sporting Cabinda	Uíge
15:00	Catongo 13' (pen.); Seda 81'	Report	45+2' (pen.) Djemba	Stadium: 4 de Janeiro; Referee: Yuri de Melo, António Miguel, Evandro Rocha

Round 5

	Sporting Cabinda	2–1	ASK Dragão	Cabinda
15:00				Stadium: Tafe

Round 3

Sun, 23 Jul 2017	ASK Dragão	0–0	Domant FC	Uíge
15:00	Leandro (yellow card) 78'	Report	(yellow card) 66' Zema	Stadium: 4 de Janeiro; Referee: Ismael Francisco, Pedro Micolo, Odeia Miguel

Round 6

Sun, 03 Sep 2017	Domant FC	2–1	ASK Dragão	Caxito
15:00	Angelino 31', 40'; Ducharme 85' (o.g.)	Report		Stadium: Estádio Municipal; Referee: Chitânio Francisco, Wilson Tiamba, Adália Jeremias

== Zone B ==
=== Table and results ===
Pos	Team	Pld	W	D	L	GF	GA	GD	Pts	Qualification or relegation	CAS	JAC	FER	EVA	VIT
1	Casa Militar (Note: Later changed their name to Cuando Cubango FC)	8	7	0	1	18	6	+12	21	Qualification for Girabola		2–1	3–2	2–1	3–0
2	Jackson Garcia	7	5	0	2	12	7	+5	15	Qualification for Girabola playoff	1–0		3–2	2–0	–
3	Ferroviário do Huambo	7	3	0	4	12	11	+1	9		0–2	2–1		3–1	2–0
4	Evale FC	6	1	0	5	6	13	−7	3		0–3	1–3	–		3–0
5	Vitória do Bié	6	1	0	5	3	13	−10	3		1–3	0–1	2–1	–	

Updated to match(es) played on 19 June 2017. Source: Girabola.com
Rules for classification: 1) Points; 2) Head-to-head points; 3) Head-to-head goal difference; 4) Goal difference; 5) Goals scored; 6) Fair-play points; 7) Play-off.

=== Match details ===
Round 1

Sun, 09 Jul 2017	Jackson Garcia	2–0	Evale FC	Benguela
15:00	Larama 30'; Edmilson 60'			Stadium: São Filipe

Sun, 09 Jul 2017	Vitória do Bié	1–3	Casa Militar	Kuito
15:00				Stadium: Vitória

Round 6

Sun, 20 Aug 2017	Evale FC	1–3	Jackson Garcia	Ondjiva
15:00				Stadium: Castilhos

Sun, 20 Aug 2017	Casa Militar	3–0	Vitória do Bié	Menongue
15:00				Stadium: Municipal

Round 2

Sun, 16 Jul 2017	Ferroviário	2–0	Vitória do Bié	Huambo
15:00	Tchuna 45'; Yuri 62'	Report		Stadium: Ferrovia; Referee: Avelino Chivela, Zacarias Kalembe, António Salazar

Sun, 16 Jul 2017	Casa Militar	2–1	Jackson Garcia	Menongue
15:00				Stadium: Municipal

Round 7

	Vitória do Bié	2–1	Ferroviário	Kuito
15:00

Sat, 26 Aug 2017	Jackson Garcia	1–0	Casa Militar	Benguela
15:00	Okocha 90+3'			Stadium: São Filipe

Round 3

Sat, 22 Jul 2017	Jackson Garcia	3–2	Ferroviário	Benguela
15:00	Edmilson 37', 50'; Miguel 73'		21' Yuri; 90+2' Bucho	Stadium: São Filipe

Sun, 23 Jul 2017	Evale FC	0–3	Casa Militar	Ondjiva
15:00				Stadium: Castilhos

Round 8

Sun, 03 Sep 2017	Ferroviário	2–1	Jackson Garcia	Huambo
15:00	Carlos 9'; Tchabalala 76'	Report	11' Okocha	Stadium: Ferrovia

Sun, 03 Sep 2017	Casa Militar	2–1	Evale FC	Menongue
15:00				Stadium: Municipal

Round 4

Sun, 30 Jul 2017	Ferroviário	3–1	Evale FC	Huambo
15:00	Jovany 9'; Bucho 22', 44'	Report	45' Máquina	Stadium: Ferrovia; Referee: Edson Essoco, Feliciano Tchalo, Faria Hossi

	Vitória do Bié	0–1	Jackson Garcia	Kuito
15:00				Stadium: Castilhos

Round 9

	Evale FC	–	Ferroviário	Huambo
15:00				Stadium: Ferrovia

	Jackson Garcia	–	Vitória do Bié	Benguela
15:00				Stadium: São Filipe

Round 5

Sun, 06 Aug 2017	Casa Militar	3–2	Ferroviário	Menongue
15:00				Stadium: Municipal

Sun, 06 Aug 2017	Evale FC	3–0	Vitória do Bié	Ondjiva
15:00				Stadium: Castilhos

Round 10

Sun, 17 Sep 2017	Ferroviário	0–2	Casa Militar	Huambo
15:00			2' Hamilton; 28' Palucho	Stadium: Ferrovia

	Vitória do Bié	–	Evale FC	Kuito
15:00

== 2018 Girabola playoff ==
Sun, 24 Sep 2017	Sporting Cabinda	5–1 (5–1 agg.)	Jackson Garcia	Cabinda
15:00	Castro 14', 62'; Gláucio I 21'; Shoma 51'; Isaías 90+5'		67' Ming	Stadium: Tafe; Referee: Inácio Cândido, Samuel Francisco, António Miguel

Sun, 01 Oct 2017	Jackson Garcia	2–1 (3–6 agg.)	Sporting Cabinda	Benguela
15:00	Okocha 6'; Miguel 31'		33' Shoma	Stadium: São Filipe

== 2017 Segundona title match ==
Sun, 15 Oct 2017	Domant FC	3–1	Casa Militar	Luanda
15:00	Sigui 59'; Abel 78'; Nelo 86'		13' Moussa	Stadium: Estádio dos Coqueiros; Referee: Chitano Francisco, Luís Sá Miranda, Adão Silva

2017 Segundona winner
Domant Futebol Clube
1st title

Squad: Abel, Alex, Angelino, Basta, Cebola, Dadá, José, Londaka, Malanga, Milton, Nelo, Nsimba, Orlando, Patrick, Peladão, Sigui, Vado, Vavá, Victor, Zema, Zezas, Zico
Head coach: Francisco André Kito

== See also ==
- 2017 Girabola
