= Mona (Angolan footballer) =

Angolan footballer

Personal information
- Full name: Nelson Miango Mudile
- Date of birth: 26 July 1997 (age 29)
- Place of birth: Luanda, Angola
- Height: 1.68 m (5 ft 6 in)
- Position: Right-back

Senior career*
| Years | Team | Apps | (Gls) |
| 2016–2024 | 1º de Agosto | | |
| 2016 | → Jackson Garcia (loan) | | |
| 2017 | → JGM Huambo (loan) | 5 | (1) |
| 2018–2020 | → Recreativo Caála (loan) | 60 | (?) |

International career^{‡}
| 2017 | Angola U20 | 3 | (0) |
| 2016– | Angola | 4 | (0) |
- * Club domestic league appearances and goals as of 19:16, 10 June 2024 (UTC) ‡ National team caps and goals as of 11:44, 9 July 2019 (UTC)

Nelson Miango Mudile (26 July 1997), commonly known as Mona, is an Angolan footballer who currently plays as a right-back.

In July 2020, Mona was announced to return to C.D. Primeiro de Agosto.

== Career statistics ==
=== Club ===
As of 9 July 2019.

| Club | Season | League | | | Cup | | Continental | | Other | | Total | |
| Club | Season | Division | Apps | Goals | Apps | Goals | Apps | Goals | Apps | Goals | Apps | Goals |
|---|---|---|---|---|---|---|---|---|---|---|---|---|
| 1º de Agosto | 2017 | Girabola | 0 | 0 | 0 | 0 | – | | 0 | 0 | 0 | 0 |
| 1º de Agosto | 2018 | Girabola | 0 | 0 | 0 | 0 | 0 | 0 | 0 | 0 | 0 | 0 |
| 1º de Agosto | 2018–19 | Girabola | 0 | 0 | 0 | 0 | 0 | 0 | 0 | 0 | 0 | 0 |
| 1º de Agosto | Total | | 0 | 0 | 0 | 0 | 0 | 0 | 0 | 0 | 0 | 0 |
| JGM Huambo (loan) | 2017 | Girabola | 5 | 1 | 0 | 0 | – | | 0 | 0 | 5 | 1 |
| Recreativo Caála (loan) | 2018 | Girabola | 11 | 1 | 0 | 0 | – | | 0 | 0 | 11 | 1 |
| Recreativo Caála (loan) | 2018–19 | Girabola | 10 | 0 | 0 | 0 | – | | 0 | 0 | 10 | 0 |
| Recreativo Caála (loan) | Total | | 21 | 1 | 0 | 0 | 0 | 0 | 0 | 0 | 21 | 1 |
| Career total | | | 26 | 2 | 0 | 0 | 0 | 0 | 0 | 0 | 26 | 2 |

=== International ===
As of matches played 29 July 2018.

| National team | Year | Apps | Goals |
|---|---|---|---|
| Angola | 2016 | 3 | 0 |
| Angola | 2017 | 0 | 0 |
| Angola | 2018 | 1 | 0 |
| Total | | 4 | 0 |
