= Popó (footballer, born 1998) =

Angolan association football player

Personal information
- Full name: Paulino Gomes Nguendelamba
- Date of birth: 4 April 1998 (age 28)
- Place of birth: Benguela, Angola
- Height: 1.72 m (5 ft 8 in)
- Position: Forward

Team information
- Current team: Cuando Cubango

Youth career
- –2017: Progresso Sambizanga

Senior career*
Years	Team	Apps	(Gls)
2016–2018	Progresso Sambizanga	6	(2)
2018–	Cuando Cubango	3	(0)

International career^{‡}
2016–	Angola	2	(0)
- * Club domestic league appearances and goals as of 11:44, 9 July 2019 (UTC) ‡ National team caps and goals as of 11:44, 9 July 2019 (UTC)

Paulino Gomes Nguendelamba (born 4 April 1998), commonly known as Popó, is an Angolan footballer who currently plays as a forward for Cuando Cubango.

== Career statistics ==
=== Club ===
As of 9 July 2019.

Club	Season	League			Cup		Continental		Other		Total	
Club	Season	Division	Apps	Goals	Apps	Goals	Apps	Goals	Apps	Goals	Apps	Goals
Progresso Sambizanga	2016	Girabola	1	0	0	0	–		0	0	1	0
Progresso Sambizanga	2017	Girabola	0	0	0	0	–		0	0	0	0
Progresso Sambizanga	2018	Girabola	5	2	0	0	–		0	0	5	2
Progresso Sambizanga	Total		6	2	0	0	0	0	0	0	6	2
Cuando Cubango	2018–19	Girabola	3	0	0	0	–		0	0	3	0
Career total			9	2	0	0	0	0	0	0	9	2

=== International ===
As of matches played 23 September 2018.

National team	Year	Apps	Goals
Angola	2016	2	0
Total		2	0
