= Atlético Futebol Polivalente =

Angolan sports club

Polivalente do Kwanza Sul
- Full name: Atlético Futebol Polivalente
- Ground: Estádio Hoji Ya Henda
- Manager: Nelson Agostinho
- League: 2nd Division
- 2016: 5th

Atlético Futebol Polivalente aka Polivalente do Kwanza Sul is an Angolan sports club from the city of Sumbe, in the Angolan southern province of Kwanza Sul. The team made its debut in the Gira Angola (Angola's second division championship) in 2016 after winning the Kwanza Sul province football championship.

== Achievements ==
- Angolan League: 0

- Angolan Cup: 0

- Angolan SuperCup: 0

- Gira Angola: 0

- Kwanza Sul provincial championship: 1

2015

== Schedule & results ==
2016; 5th	10 Jul (a); JAC 1–0	16 Jul (h); 1–2 JGM	24 Jul (a); CAS 0–0	6 Aug (h); 1–1 MAQ
2016; 5th	21 Aug (h); 1–1 JAC	27 Aug (a); JGM 0–1	3 Sep (h); 3–3 CAS	18 Sep (a); MAQ 3–2

Win Draw Loss

== Manager history ==
(Angola) Paulo Saraiva	(2016)	-

== See also ==
- Girabola
- Gira Angola
