= C.D. Ngueto Maka =

Angolan sports club

- Full name: Clube Desportivo Ngueto Maka
- Founded: 14 February 2005; 20 years ago
- Ground: Estádio 4 de Janeiro
- Manager: Carlos Azulinho
- League: 2nd Division
- 2016: Withdrew
Home colours

Clube Desportivo Ngueto Maka is an Angolan sports club from the city of Uíge. The team made its debut in the Gira Angola (Angola's second division championship) in 2016 after finishing second in the Uige province football championship.

== Achievements ==
- Angolan League: 0

- Angolan Cup: 0

- Angolan SuperCup: 0

- Gira Angola: 0

- Uige provincial championship: 0

== Manager history ==
(Angola) Carlos Azulinho	(2016)	-

== See also ==
- Girabola
- Gira Angola
