= Vitória A.C. Bié =

Angolan sports club

Vitória do Bié
- Full name: Vitória Atlético Clube do Bié
- Founded: 15 August 1932; 92 years ago
- Ground: Estádio do Vitória Clube; Kuito, Angola
- Capacity: 10,000
- Chairman: Joaquim Alfredo Novato
- Manager: Armando Nhanhaleca
- League: 2nd Division

Vitória Atlético Clube do Bié, is a sports club from Kuito, Angola. The club is notably one of the debutants of the Girabola, having participated in its first edition in 1979, as a last-minute replacement for Desportivo de Camacupa, also from Bié.

The club made history in the Girabola as it was one of their players, a late Domingos Adriano aka Minguito who scored the first goal in the Angolan football championship.

After that initial participation, in spite of several participations in the Gira Angola -the second division- the club has never returned to the Angolan premier league.

In 2017, the club participated in the Angolan second division, the Gira Angola.

== Staff ==
Name	Nat	Pos
Technical staff
Armando Nhanhaleca	(Angola)	Head coach
	(Angola)	Assistant coach
	(Angola)	Goalkeeper coach
Medical
	(Angola)	Physician
	(Angola)	Physio
Management
Joaquim Alfredo Novato	(Angola)	Chairman
	(Angola)	Head of Foot Dept

== Chairman history ==
- Jorge Dongo 2004–2012
- Joaquim Novato 2012–

== See also ==
- Girabola
