= Evale FC =

Angolan football club

- Full name: Evale Futebol Clube
- Ground: Estádio Municipal dos Castilhos; Ondjiva, Cunene, Angola
- Capacity: 4800
- Manager: Miguel Kanhanga
- League: 2nd Division
- 2014: 2nd (Série B)

Evale Futebol Clube is an Angolan football club from Evale, a village in the southern province of Cunene. They currently play in Gira Angola the Angolan Second Division after being promoted from the Angola Provincial Stage.

== Stadium ==
Currently the team plays at the Estádio Municipal dos Castilhos in Cunene's capital city of Ondjiva.

== Manager history ==
Abel da Conceição	2012
Pedro António "Quissa"	2014
Miguel Kanhanga	2017

== See also ==
- Girabola
