= Santa Rita de Cássia =

Municipality of Bahia State, Brazil

- Municipality of Bahia, Brazil
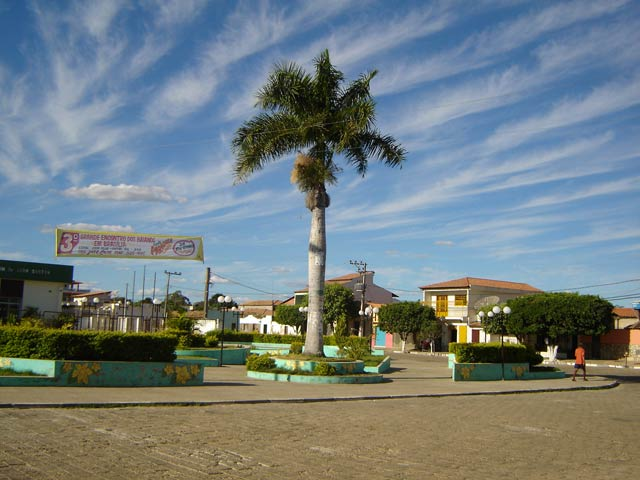
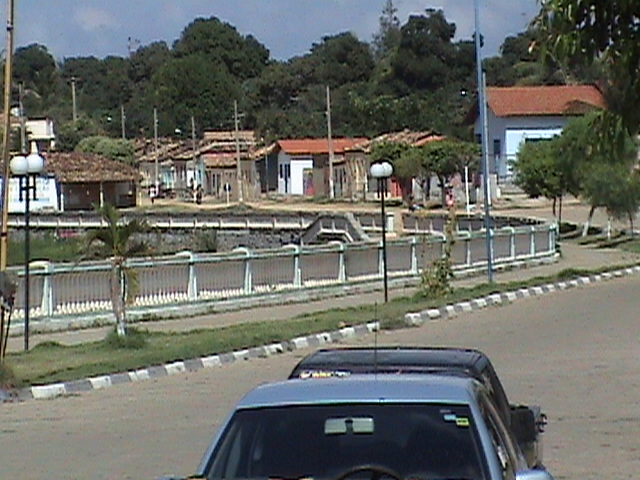
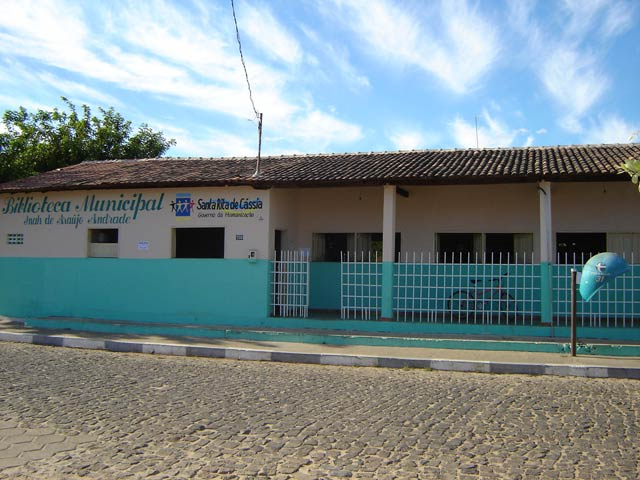
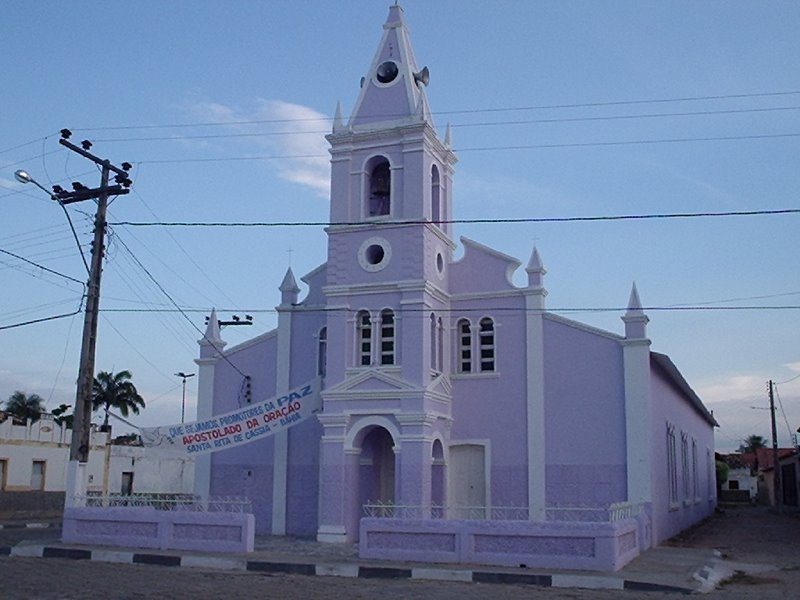
- Plaza Rui Barbosa Preto River running through the urban perimeters Main library Matriz Church

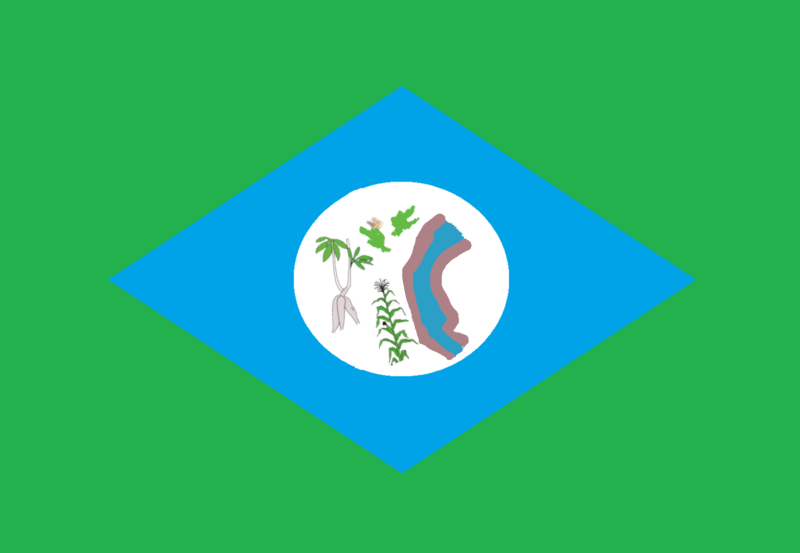
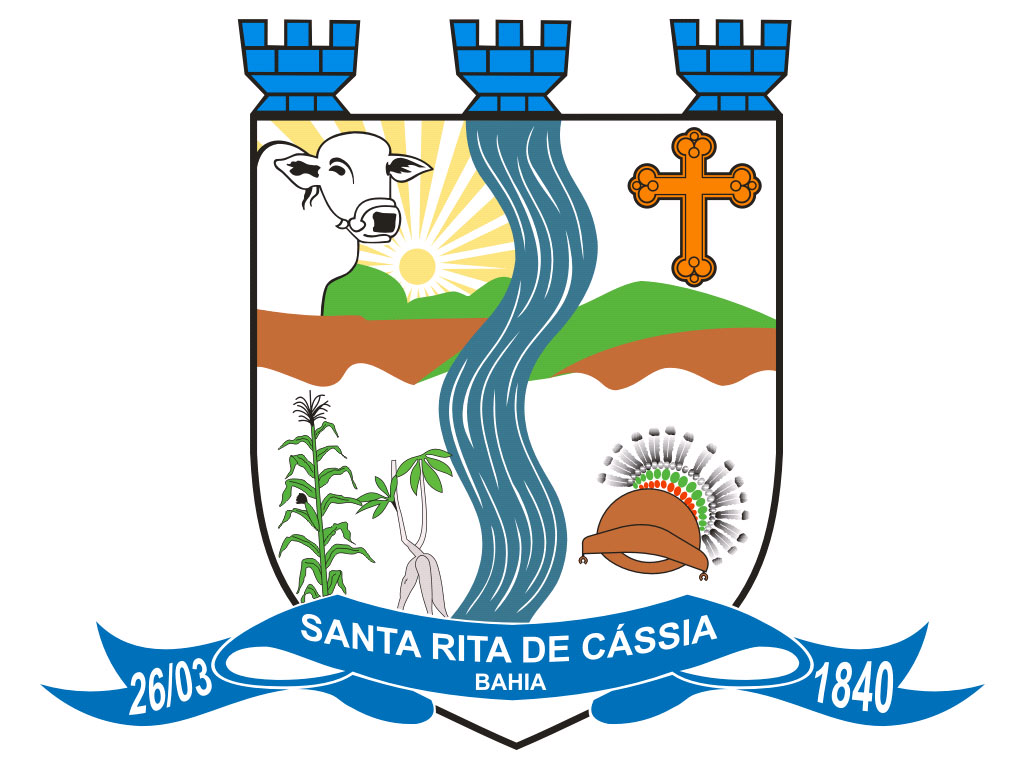
- Flag Coat of arms
- Etymology: Named after the patron saint Rita of Cascia
- Location of Santa Rita de Cássia in Bahia

- Location within Brazil Location within South America
- Coordinates: 11°00′S 44°32′W
- Country: Brazil
- Region: Northeast
- State: Bahia
- Founded: 26 March 1840

Government
  - Mayor: José Benedito Rocha Aragão (PSD) (2025-2028)
  - Vice Mayor: Leila Bomfim de Araújo Serpa (Republicanos) (2025-2028)

Area
  - Total: 6,030.491 km^{2} (2,328.386 sq mi)
- Elevation: 440 m (1,440 ft)

Population (2022)
  - Total: 27,390
  - Density: 4.54/km^{2} (11.8/sq mi)
- Demonym: Santa-ritense (Brazilian Portuguese)
- Time zone: UTC-03:00 (Brasília Time)
- Postal code: 47150-000
- HDI (2010): 0.605 – medium
- Website: santaritadecassia.ba.gov.br

Santa Rita de Cássia (once called Rio Preto and Ibipetuba) is a Brazilian municipality in the state of Bahia. In 2020 the town's population was estimated as 28,481 inhabitants.

== History ==
In mid 17th century, a Portuguese couple traveled to the city of Ibipetuba, and when they left the city they forgot a Santa Rita de Cássia's image inside of the plain house where they had lodged. The new colonists, who established in that place, founded a farm called ""Ribeira do Rio Preto"", along the margins of Preto river, later on, its name was changed to Santa Rita Farm, due to the image that was found, and a chapel was built in honor to that saint. As the settlement grew rapidly, it became primitive village of Santa Rita do Rio Preto, attaining a Parish City Hall, with the creation of Santa Rita de Cássia's parish, in 1804. In 1931, its name was changed to Rio Preto, and later on, in 1943, Ibipetuba, that means ""sand-bank"". In 1957, its name was changed to Santa Rita de Cássia.

== Economy ==
Agriculture (6th watermelon producer and 36th of cassava). According to JUCEB's registers, it has 24 industries, occupying the 117th place in units throughout the State of Bahia, and has 535 commercial businesses, retaining the 30th position. Its hotel park records 90 beds. The residential electricity use amounts to 78,45 kwh/hab - 122nd in ranking within the State.

== Climate ==
Climate data for Santa Rita de Cássia (1991–2020)
Month	Jan	Feb	Mar	Apr	May	Jun	Jul	Aug	Sep	Oct	Nov	Dec	Year
Mean daily maximum °C (°F)	32.5 (90.5)	31.8 (89.2)	32.0 (89.6)	32.4 (90.3)	32.5 (90.5)	32.4 (90.3)	32.5 (90.5)	34.0 (93.2)	35.8 (96.4)	36.2 (97.2)	33.8 (92.8)	32.9 (91.2)	33.2 (91.8)
Daily mean °C (°F)	—	25.4 (77.7)	25.5 (77.9)	25.6 (78.1)	25.0 (77.0)	23.8 (74.8)	23.5 (74.3)	24.9 (76.8)	27.0 (80.6)	28.2 (82.8)	26.7 (80.1)	26.0 (78.8)	—
Mean daily minimum °C (°F)	19.9 (67.8)	19.9 (67.8)	20.1 (68.2)	19.6 (67.3)	17.9 (64.2)	15.1 (59.2)	14.0 (57.2)	14.9 (58.8)	17.6 (63.7)	20.0 (68.0)	20.3 (68.5)	20.0 (68.0)	18.3 (64.9)
Average precipitation mm (inches)	171.5 (6.75)	132.6 (5.22)	152.5 (6.00)	71.6 (2.82)	21.6 (0.85)	1.1 (0.04)	0.0 (0.0)	2.0 (0.08)	6.5 (0.26)	62.7 (2.47)	166.6 (6.56)	173.7 (6.84)	962.4 (37.89)
Average precipitation days (≥ 1.0 mm)	10.7	10.0	10.7	5.5	2.3	0.1	0.0	0.2	0.6	4.6	10.0	9.9	64.6
Average relative humidity (%)	—	71.9	72.5	68.4	62.6	55.2	50.2	45.0	42.2	45.7	61.6	66.6	—
Average dew point °C (°F)	20.2 (68.4)	20.4 (68.7)	20.8 (69.4)	20.2 (68.4)	18.5 (65.3)	16.0 (60.8)	14.4 (57.9)	14.0 (57.2)	15.0 (59.0)	16.4 (61.5)	18.8 (65.8)	19.8 (67.6)	17.9 (64.2)
Mean monthly sunshine hours	226.5	194.8	225.3	243.3	266.2	286.7	307.1	311.2	280.9	257.4	205.8	216.8	3,022
Source: NOAA
