= 2018 Girabola =

Girabola
- Season: 2018
- Champions: Primeiro de Agosto
- Relegated: Domant FC; 1º de Maio; J.G.M.
- CAF Champions League: Primeiro de Agosto (winner)
- CAF Confederation Cup: Petro de Luanda (runner-up)
- Matches: 196
- Goals: 399 (2.04 per match)
- Top goalscorer: Azulão (20)
- Biggest home win: Kabuscorp 5–0 Libolo (03 Mar 2018); Interclube 5–0 J.G.M. (21 Apr 2018)
- Biggest away win: Kabuscorp 0–5 D'Agosto (30 Jun 2018)
- Highest scoring: 1º Maio 4–3 Domant (4 Mar 2018)
- Longest winning run: 1º de Agosto (7) (18 Apr-30 May)
- Longest unbeaten run: 1º de Agosto (26) (11 Mar-02 Sep)
- Longest winless run: Domant FC (14) (13 Mar-30 Jun)
- Longest losing run: 1º de Maio (5) (18 Jul-05 Aug)
- All statistics correct as of 2 September 2018.

The 2018 Girabola was the 40th season of top-tier football in Angola. The season ran from 10 February to 2 September 2018.

The league comprised 16 teams, the bottom three of which were relegated to the 2019 Provincial stages.

Primeiro de Agosto won their third title in a row, qualifying to the 2018–19 CAF Champions League.

On an exceptional basis, on account of the Angola Cup not being contested this season, Petro de Luanda, the runner up, qualified to the 2018–19 CAF Confederation Cup.

== Teams ==
A total of 16 teams contested the league, including 13 sides from the 2017 season and three promoted from the 2017 Segundona - Cuando Cubango FC, Domant FC and Sporting de Cabinda.

On the other hand, Progresso da Lunda Sul, ASA and Santa Rita de Cássia were the last three teams of the 2017 season and will play in their respective provincial leagues seeking qualification for the 2018 2nd division qualifiers. Clube Desportivo Primeiro de Agosto were the defending champions from the 2017 season.

== Changes from 2017 season ==
Relegated: ASA, Progresso da Lunda Sul, Santa Rita de Cássia
Promoted: Cuando Cubango FC, Domant FC, Sporting de Cabinda

== J.G.M. withdrawal ==
In late April, J.G.M. submitted a withdrawal request to the Angolan Football Federation citing financial reasons. The request was granted. As a result, all points won in games against J.G.M. were withdrawn.

== FIFA penalties ==
In May, FIFA has instructed the Angolan Football Federation that Kabuscorp should forfeit 6 points as a result of being in default to their former star player Rivaldo. In a weekly report issued by the Angolan federation, it is further stated that the club may be banned from official competition in case the claimant files a new complaint.

In June, FIFA again ruled that Kabuscorp forfeits 6 points in the League for being in default with TP Mazembe in the 2014 deal with DRC midfielder Trésor Mputu.

In July, FIFA ruled that Progresso Associação do Sambizanga forfeits 6 points in the League for being in default with Ghanaian striker Raphael Kwaku Obeng.

=== Stadiums and locations ===
Locations of the 2018 Girabola teams

Team	Home city	Stadium	Capacity	2017 season
Académica do Lobito	Lobito	Estádio do Buraco	15,000	12th in Girabola
Bravos do Maquis	Luena	Estádio Mundunduleno	4,300	11th in Girabola
Cuando Cubango FC	Menongue	Campo Municipal	5,000	2nd in Segundona
Desportivo da Huíla	Lubango	Estádio do Ferroviário da Huíla	25,000	9th in Girabola
Domant FC	Caxito	Estádio Municipal	5,000	1st in Segundona
Interclube	Luanda	Estádio 22 de Junho	7,000	6th in Girabola
J.G.M.	Huambo	Estádio dos Kurikutelas	5,000	13th in Girabola
Kabuscorp	Luanda	Estádio dos Coqueiros	12,000	4th in Girabola
Petro de Luanda	Luanda	Estádio 11 de Novembro	50,000	2nd in Girabola
Primeiro de Agosto	Luanda	Estádio 11 de Novembro	50,000	Girabola Champions
Primeiro de Maio	Benguela	Estádio Edelfride Costa	6,000	10th in Girabola
Progresso do Sambizanga	Luanda	Estádio dos Coqueiros	12,000	7th in Girabola
Recreativo da Caála	Caála	Estádio Mártires da Canhala	12,000	8th in Girabola
Recreativo do Libolo	Calulo	Estádio Municipal	10,000	5th in Girabola
Sagrada Esperança	Dundo	Estádio Sagrada Esperança	8,000	3rd in Girabola
Sporting de Cabinda	Cabinda	Estádio do Tafe	9,000	3rd in Segundona

== League table ==
Pos	Team	Pld	W	D	L	GF	GA	GD	Pts	Qualification or relegation
1	Primeiro de Agosto (C)	28	15	12	1	31	8	+23	57	Qualification for Champions League
2	Petro de Luanda	28	14	12	2	38	15	+23	54	Qualification for Confederation Cup (Note: Due to the fact that this season's cup was not held.)
3	Interclube	28	12	6	10	32	23	+9	42	
4	Recreativo do Libolo	28	10	10	8	28	26	+2	40	
5	Académica do Lobito	28	9	11	8	19	21	−2	38	
6	Desportivo da Huíla	28	8	12	8	16	17	−1	36	
7	Sagrada Esperança	28	8	11	9	29	28	+1	35	
8	Bravos do Maquis	28	9	7	12	23	27	−4	34	
9	Kabuscorp (Note: Kabuscorp were deducted 12 points as a result of payment default.)	28	13	5	10	42	38	+4	32	
10	Sporting de Cabinda	28	7	11	10	21	26	−5	32	
11	Cuando Cubango FC	28	8	7	13	18	28	−10	31	
12	Recreativo da Caála	28	8	7	13	22	36	−14	31	
13	Progresso do Sambizanga (Note: Progresso were deducted 6 points as a result of payment default.)	28	7	15	6	26	23	+3	30	
14	Domant FC (R)	28	5	10	13	24	38	−14	25	Relegation to Provincial stages
15	Primeiro de Maio (R)	28	4	10	14	23	38	−15	22	Relegation to Provincial stages
16	J.G.M. (D)	12	0	3	9	7	24	−17	3	Disqualified

Updated to match(es) played on 2 September 2018. Source: Girabola.com
Rules for classification: 1) Points; 2) Head-to-head points; 3) Head-to-head goal difference; 4) Goal difference; 5) Goals scored; 6) Fair-play points; 7) Play-off.
(C) Champions; (D) Disqualified; (R) Relegated

== Results ==
Home \ Away	ACA	BMQ	CCU	DHL	DOM	INT	KAB	PET	PRI	PRM	PRO	RCA	RLB	SAG	SCC
Académica do Lobito	—	3–1	1–0	0–0	0–0	2–1	1–3	0–0	1–0	2–2	1–0	2–0	1–0	0–2	0–0
Bravos do Maquis	1–1	—	1–0	0–1	3–2	0–1	1–0	0–3	1–1	3–0	3–2	2–1	2–0	0–0	0–0
Cuando Cubango FC	2–0	0–0	—	0–0	2–0	0–1	0–1	0–0	0–1	0–0	1–0	2–0	1–0	1–1	3–0 (Note: Cuando Cubango was awarded a 3–0 win)
Desportivo da Huíla	0–1	1–0	3–1	—	3–0	1–1	1–1	0–0	1–2	0–0	0–0	1–0	0–0	0–0	1–0
Domant FC	1–0	2–1	0–1	1–1	—	2–1	1–2	1–4	1–3	1–1	1–1	0–0	2–2	1–0	2–1
Interclube	0–0	0–1	4–0	0–0	1–0	—	2–0	0–2	0–1	2–0	2–0	3–1	1–3	2–0	1–0
Kabuscorp	2–2	2–0	2–1	0–1	2–1	1–1	—	0–3	0–5	4–2	3–2	3–0	5–0	2–0	3–0
Petro de Luanda	0–0	1–0	4–0	2–0	1–0	2–1	1–0	—	0–2	0–0	1–1	2–1	0–0	1–1	3–1
Primeiro de Agosto	0–0	1–0	1–0	1–0	1–0	2–0	3–1	0–0	—	0–0	0–0	0–0	0–0	1–0	0–0
Primeiro de Maio	0–1	1–0	1–1	0–1	4–3	0–2	1–1	1–2	0–1	—	0–1	4–1	1–1	2–2	1–0
Progresso do Sambizanga	0–0	0–0	1–0	1–0	1–1	0–0	4–0	0–0	1–1	2–1	—	1–1	0–0	2–0	0–0
Recreativo da Caála	2–0	2–1	0–0	2–0	0–0	1–0	1–0	1–0	0–2	1–0	1–1	—	2–0	1–2	0–0
Recreativo do Libolo	1–0	1–0	0–1	3–0	0–0	1–1	1–2	2–2	0–0	2–0	2–0	4–1	—	2–1	1–0
Sagrada Esperança	1–0	0–1	5–1	0–0	1–1	2–1	1–0	0–1	2–2	2–1	1–1	3–1	1–2	—	1–1
Sporting de Cabinda	2–0	1–1	1–0	1–0	1–0	1–3	2–2	1–1	0–0	2–0	1–2	3–1	2–0	0–0	—

Updated to match(es) played on 2 September 2018. Source: girabola.com
Legend: Blue = home team win; Yellow = draw; Red = away team win.

=== Positions by round ===
Team ╲ Round	1	2	3	4	5	6	7	8	9	10	11	12	13	14	15	16	17	18	19	20	21	22	23	24	25	26	27	28	29	30
1º de Agosto	5	3	2	3	2	3	3	3	3	3	2	2	1	1	1	1	1	1	2	1	2	2	2	2	1	1	1	1	1	1
Petro de Luanda	1	1	4	2	3	2	2	2	2	2	3	3	3	2	2	2	2	2	1	2	1	1	1	1	3	2	2	2	2	2
Interclube	5	2	1	1	1	1	1	1	1	1	1	1	2	3	3	3	3	3	3	3	3	3	3	3	2	3	3	3	3	3
Recreativo do Libolo	2	5	3	5	4	6	7	8	8	8	8	9	6	6	7	6	5	7	8	8	9	9	8	8	8	7	4	4	4	4
Académica do Lobito	13	14	15	12	10	10	9	6	7	6	6	5	5	4	5	5	6	5	5	5	6	6	5	7	7	8	5	5	5	5
Desportivo da Huíla	5	10	5	6	7	4	5	4	4	4	4	4	4	5	4	4	4	4	4	4	4	4	4	4	4	5	7	7	7	6
Sagrada Esperança	10	12	12	7	5	8	4	5	5	5	5	6	7	9	11	10	11	8	6	7	7	7	7	6	5	4	6	6	6	7
Bravos do Maquis	9	4	9	12	13	14	12	13	10	9	10	8	9	11	10	11	13	12	12	11	12	12	10	9	9	9	9	10	11	8
Kabuscorp	10	13	14	15	15	15	15	15	15	15	13	11	11	7	6	9	10	11	9	10	11	10	9	10	10	10	10	8	8	9
Sporting de Cabinda	2	6	6	7	10	11	13	10	12	13	15	12	12	8	8	7	7	6	7	6	5	5	6	5	6	6	8	9	9	10
Cuando Cubango FC	15	9	10	14	14	9	8	9	9	10	12	14	14	13	13	13	9	10	11	12	10	11	11	12	11	11	11	12	12	11
Recreativo da Caála	4	6	6	11	12	13	11	10	13	14	11	13	13	14	14	14	14	14	14	14	15	15	15	15	14	14	13	13	13	12
Progresso	5	10	11	4	8	5	6	7	6	7	7	7	8	10	9	8	8	9	10	9	8	8	12	11	12	12	12	11	10	13
Domant FC	4	6	6	9	6	7	10	10	10	11	14	15	15	15	15	15	15	15	15	15	14	14	13	13	13	13	14	14	14	14
1º de Maio	13	15	13	9	9	12	14	14	14	11	9	10	10	12	12	12	12	13	13	13	13	13	14	14	15	15	15	15	15	15

Leader (2018–19 CAF Champions League)
Runner-up (2018–19 CAF Confederation Cup)
Relegation to 2019 Provincial stages

Source: Girabola

=== Clubs season progress ===
Team ╲ Round	1	2	3	4	5	6	7	8	9	10	11	12	13	14	15	16	17	18	19	20	21	22	23	24	25	26	27	28
Académica Lobito	L	L	W	D	D	W	W	L	W	D	D	D	W	L	D	W	D	D	L	D	D	L	L	W	W	W	L	D
Bravos do Maquis	W	L	L	L	W	D	D	W	L	L	W	D	L	D	L	D	L	W	L	L	W	W	D	W	L	L	W	D
Cuando Cubango FC	L	W	L	L	L	W	W	D	D	L	L	L	W	L	D	W	D	L	D	D	L	D	L	W	L	W	W	L
Desportivo da Huíla	D	D	W	L	D	W	L	W	W	D	L	D	D	W	D	D	D	D	W	W	D	D	L	L	L	L	W	L
Domant FC	W	L	D	L	W	D	L	L	D	L	L	D	D	L	D	L	D	D	L	W	L	W	D	L	D	L	L	W
Interclube	D	W	W	W	W	W	L	L	W	W	D	L	L	W	D	L	L	W	D	W	W	D	D	W	L	L	L	L
Kabuscorp	L	W	W	L	W	L	L	W	W	W	D	W	W	L	W	D	W	L	L	W	D	D	L	W	L	W	L	D
Petro de Luanda	W	D	W	D	D	D	D	L	W	D	W	W	W	W	D	D	W	W	D	W	D	D	L	W	W	W	W	D
1º de Agosto	D	L	W	D	W	D	W	W	W	W	W	W	W	D	D	D	D	D	W	D	D	W	W	W	D	W	D	W
1º de Maio	L	D	W	D	L	L	D	L	W	W	D	D	L	L	D	D	L	D	L	L	D	D	L	L	L	L	L	W
Progresso	D	D	W	L	W	L	D	D	W	L	D	L	D	D	D	D	D	D	D	D	W	D	W	D	L	W	W	L
Recreativo da Caála	W	L	D	L	L	W	D	L	L	W	L	D	L	L	L	W	L	L	D	L	D	W	L	W	D	D	W	W
Recreativo do Libolo	W	L	W	L	W	L	D	D	D	D	D	W	L	D	D	W	L	L	L	W	D	D	D	W	W	W	L	W
Sagrada Esperança	L	D	L	W	W	L	W	D	W	L	D	L	L	L	D	D	W	W	D	D	D	L	W	W	D	L	D	D
Sporting de Cabinda	W	L	D	L	W	L	L	D	W	D	W	D	L	D	D	D	W	W	D	D	L	W	L	D	L	L	L	D

== Season statistics ==
=== Top scorers ===
As of 2 September 2018

Rank	Scorer	Club	Apps	GPG
20 Goals
1	(Brazil) Azulão	Petro Atlético	25(1)	0.78
14 Goals
2	(Brazil) Magrão	Rec do Libolo	13	1.07
10 Goals
3	(Angola) Nelito	Kabuscorp	22(5)	0.40
4	(Angola) Careca	Bravos Maquis	24(2)	0.40
5	(Angola) Mano	Interclube	27	0.37
9 Goals
6	(Angola) Mabululu	Domant FC	25	0.36
8 Goals
7	(Angola) Yano	Progresso	19(2)	0.40
8	(Democratic Republic of the Congo) Jacques	1º de Agosto	19(8)	0.34
7 Goals
9	(Argentina) Calero	Kabuscorp	8(12)	0.50
10	(Senegal) Ben Traoré	Sagrada	18(2)	0.36
11	(Angola) Pedro	Interclube	18(7)	0.32
12	(Cameroon) Lionel	Desportivo	23(1)	0.29

==== Hat-tricks ====
Player	For	Against	Result	Ref	Date
Nelito	Kabuscorp	Sporting Cabinda	3-0		16 February 2018
Azulão	Petro Luanda	Sporting Cabinda	3-1		24 May 2018

2018 Girabola winner

12th title

Squad:
Julião, Neblú, Tony Cabaça (GK)
Bobo, Bonifácio, Dani, Guelor, Isaac, Natael, Paizo, Yisa (DF)
Ary Papel, Buá, Geraldo, Gogoró, Macaia, Mário, Mingo Bile, Mongo, Nelson, Show (MF)
Jacques, Fofó, Mabululu, Melono, Razaq, Vanilson (FW)
Zoran Manojlović (Head Coach)

Top Scorer
