= Segundona =

- Founded: 1995; 31 years ago
- Country: Angola
- Confederation: CAF
- Number of clubs: 18
- Level on pyramid: 2
- Promotion to: Girabola
- Relegation to: Angola Provincial Stage
- Domestic cup(s): Angolan Cup; Angolan SuperCup
- Current champions: Recreativo da Caála (1ⁿ title) (2026)
- Most championships: Sporting de Cabinda (2)
- Current: 2026

Segundona aka Torneio de Apuramento (Qualification Tournament) or Gira Angola is the 2nd division of Angolan football (soccer). It is organized by the Angolan Football Federation and gives access to Angola's top tier football division Girabola.

Unlike most league systems worldwide, Angola does not have a regular second-tier league system. The teams that are relegated from the top-tier league in Angola, the Girabola, are relegated to the provincial championship from which they originate, the so-called provincial stages. The champion of each provincial championship automatically qualifies to the Segundona, the league or tournament that qualifies to the Girabola.

== History ==
The competition's first edition was played in 1981. It was contested by 20 teams divided in four groups of five teams each, with the winner of each group qualifying for the Girabola and the winners of each group contesting for the title of the league champion. Clubs from all provinces of the country disputed the competition. In 2009 the competition was again played by eighteen clubs and officially named as Segundona.

From the 2011 edition on, the winners of the series played a round robin tournament to determine the league champion.

== 2011–2020 ==
Segundona club participation details 2011–2020

League Champion & Promoted as group winner
Promoted as group winner
Promoted as 2nd-place playoff winner
Disqualified

Team	PRO	2011		2012		2013			2014			2015		2016		2017		2018		2019	2020–21			
Team	PRO	A	B	A	B	A	B	C	A	B	C	A	B	A	B	A	B	A	B		A	B	C	D
Team	PRO	4 de Abril	CCU							3			4		2									
17 de Maio	BEN		7		11																			
Académica do Lobito	BEN				4		2			CH														
Académica do Soyo	ZAI					2					6													
Águias Sport	UIG			5																		P		
Ajuda Social	LDS															DQF								
AKC	CUN																		4	DQF				
ARA da Gabela	CZS		8		6																			
ASK Dragão	UIG															DQF		3				P		
ASA	LUA																	CH						
Atlético do Namibe	NAM		1																					
Baixa de Cassanje	MAL	8		11				5																
Benfica de Cabinda	CAB	7		7		7															P			
Benfica do Huambo	HUA		3		9																			
Benfica do Lubango	HUI		5		3		1													4				
Bikuku FC	LDS																		1					
Bravos do Maquis	MOX														1									
Cabinda SC	CAB					4								4										
Construtores do Uíge	UIG								3															
Casa Militar	CCU												5		3		1							
Desportivo da Huíla	HUI		4		1																			
Desportivo da Lunda Sul	LDS			5																				P
Desportivo do Chingo	CZS				8																			
Desportivo do Pombo	UIG			5																		P		
Domant FC	BGO	4		2					1					3		CH				6				
Esperança do Congo	ZAI								6															
Evale FC	CUN				5		5			2							4							
F.C. de Cabinda	CAB			10		8																		
Ferroviário do Huambo	HUA																3		2	CH				
Ismael FC	UIG											2												
J.G.M.	HUA						DQF						4		2									
Jackson Garcia	BEN						6				3		3		4		2		3	5				
Jovens de Hoje	MOX			5																				P
Juventude Atlética de Saurimo	LDS							7																P
Kabuscorp	LUA			5																	P			
Kaka Paulo	MAL			5																		P		
Kilamba City	LUA			5																	P			
Malanje Sport Clube	MAL							2			2													
Mpatu a Ponta	BGO									3								5					P	
Mundo Verde	CZS			5																			P	
Nacional de Benguela	BEN		2				3																	
Nedji Academia	LUA			5																	P			
Ngueto Maka	UIG													DQF										
Norberto de Castro	LUA	2		4		3					5													
Paulo FC	BGO																			7	P			
Pecandec	MAL			5																				
Petro do Huambo	HUA				7		4			4														
Polivalentes FC	LUA			8		5			4			4												
Polivalente KS	CZS														5									
Porcelana FC	CZN	5		1					5			1												
Primeiro de Maio	BEN				2								CH							2				
Progresso da Lunda Sul	LDS										1													
Real M'buco	CAB								2									DQF						
Recreativo do Seles	CZS									5														
Renascimento	UIG							6				3												
Ritondo	MAL	6		9																				
Santa Rita de Cássia	UIG													CH				2						
São Salvador	ZAI					6												4				P		
Sporting de Benguela	BEN																		5	8			P	
Sporting de Cabinda	CAB	1				1								2		2								
Sporting do Bié	BIE							8											6					P
Stad do Uíge	UIG	3		6				4																
União da Catumbela	BEN		6		10																			
União do Cuanza Norte	CZN																	DQF						
União do Uíge	UIG			3				1																
Vitória do Bié	BIE																5							P
Wiliete SC	BEN																			3				
Years		2011		2012		2013			2014			2015		2016		2017		2018		2019	2020			

== 2001–2010 ==
Segundona club participation details 2001–2010

League Champion & Promoted as group winner
Promoted as group winner
Promoted as 2nd-place playoff winner
Disqualified

Team	PRO	2001			2002			2003			2004			2005			2006			2007		2008		2009			2010	
Team	PRO	A	B	C	A	B	C	A	B	C	A	B	C	A	B	C	A	B	C	A	B	A	B	A	B	C	A	B
Team	PRO	15 de Setembro	LDS									4			6													
17 de Maio	BEN																								3			7
17 de Setembro	HUA											5																
21 de Janeiro	CAB										5																	
28 de Fevereiro	LDN																		3									
Académica do Lobito	BEN																	5			4		2					2
Académica do Soyo	ZAI				(Note: Académica do Soyo finished 1st but was disqualified for fielding an ineligible player)			1						1								1						
Águias de Saurimo	LDS																		5									
Águias Sport Clube	LDS																									3		
Atlético do Namibe	NAM																						3		4			6
Baixa de Cassanje	MAL									3			3			4			4				6			4	4	
Baluartes do Kuito	BIE						DQF																					
Belenenses FC	LUA																2			4								
Benfica da Milunga	UIG										6			6														
Benfica de Cabinda	CAB				2			3														4		5			8	
Benfica de Luanda	LUA										1																	
Benfica do Huambo	HUA														2			3					4		5			3
Benfica do Lubango	HUI								1						1										1			
Benfica do Sumbe	CZS					2																						
Bravos do Maquis	MOX						2			1						1					1							
Brilhantes da Quissama	LUA										3			5														
Casa Helu	LDN																									2		
Cuca B.G.I.	MAL															6												
D. Afonso Nteka	ZAI																5			6		6						
Desportivo da Chibia	HUI														6			6										
Desportivo da Huíla	HUI		1									1																
Desportivo de Negage	UIG																							6				
Desportivo do Bengo	BGO	2																										
Desportivo do Keve	CZS								2			2																
Desportivo do Seles	CZS		2																									
Domant FC	BGO																										2	
Dragões do K.K.	CCU																									5		
Esperança do Congo	ZAI																			5				7				
F.C. da Corimba	LUA	3																										
F.C. de Cabinda	CAB																			3				2				
F.C. de Ondjiva	CUN																						7					
F.C. do Uíge	UIG																4											
Ferroviário da Huíla	HUI											6			4													
Ganuve FC	LDN						DQF																					
Gira Jovem	BGO																					5						
GN do Cunene	CUN																											8
Inter do Moxico	MOX															3												
Juventude do Moxico	MOX																		1									
Kabuscorp	LUA										4			2			3			1								
Kakuvas do Cunene	CUN														5			7							6			
Lacrau Army	MOX															5												
Landana FC	CAB																							8				
Leões do Tchifuxi	MOX																				5		5					
Nacional de Benguela	BEN																											5
Norberto de Castro	LUA																										3	
Pecandec	MAL												4															
Petro do Huambo	HUA																	1							2			
Polivalentes FC	LUA													4										4				
Porcelana FC	CZN																										7	
Primeiro de Maio	BEN					1																						1
Progresso do Sambizanga	LUA				1																	3		3			1	
Real de Mbanza Congo	ZAI																										5	
Real Sport do Congo	ZAI																							9				
Recreativo da Caála	HUA								3			4			3			4			3		1					
Recreativo da Kafanda	BGO																							10			6	
Recreativo do Libolo	CZS																	2			2							
Recreativo do Seles	CZS																											4
Ritondo	MAL			2			1						2			2			2							6		
Sagrada Esperança	LDN																									1		
Santos FC	LUA							2			2			3			1											
Sassamba da Lunda Sul	LDS												5															
Sporting de Cabinda	CAB	1																		2		2		1				
Sporting do Bié	BIE			1						2			1															
Sporting do Sumbe	CZS											3			DQF													
Years		2001			2002			2003			2004			2005			2006			2007		2008		2009			2010	

== 1991–2000 ==
Segundona club participation details 1991–2000

Team	PRO	1991			1992			1993			1994			1995			1996			1997			1998			1999			2000		
Team	PRO	A	B	C	A	B	C	A	B	C	A	B	C	A	B	C	A	B	C	A	B	C	A	B	C	A	B	C	A	B	C
Team	PRO	30 de Junho	CAB																						2						
Académica do Soyo	ZAI																													4	
ARA da Gabela	CZS																									2					
Cambondo	MAL																								1						
Dínamo do Bengo	BGO																													3	
F.C. da Corimba	LUA																						3								
Ferroviário da Huíla	HUI																							1							
Independente do Tômbwa	NAM																													2	
Inter de Luanda	LUA																						1								
Primeiro de Maio	BEN																													1	
Sporting do Bié	BIE																								2	1					
Years		1991			1992			1993			1994			1995			1996			1997			1998			1999			2000		

== 1981–1990 ==
Segundona club participation details 1981–1990

Team	PRO	1981				1982				1983			1984			1985			1986			1987			1988			1989			1990		
Team	PRO	A	B	C	D	A	B	C	D	A	B	C	A	B	C	A	B	C	A	B	C	A	B	C	A	B	C	A	B	C	A	B	C
Team	PRO	1º Congresso do Moxico	MOX	4																													
4 de Janeiro	UIG			2																													
Construtores do Uíge	UIG																2																
Desportivo da Guedal	HUI		5																														
Desportivo de Benguela	BEN						1																										
Diabos Negros	CZN			3																													
Dínamos do Cuando Cubango	CCU															5																	
Estrela do Mar	LDS				5																												
F.C. de Cabinda	CAB																1																
F.C. de Mbanza Congo	ZAI			4																													
Ferroviário de Moçâmedes	NAM		4			2																											
Gaiatos de Benguela	BEN	3																															
Ginásio do Cuando Cubango	CCU	5				3																											
Inter da Huíla	HUI					1																											
Inter da Lunda Sul	LDS																	1															
Inter de Luanda	LUA								1																								
Inter do Cunene	CUN															4																	
Juventude de Porto Amboim	CZS				2																												
Juventude do Kunje	BIE																	6															
Juventude Progresso	MAL				4																												
Kakuvas do Cunene	CUN		3																														
Kilambas do Cuanza Sul	CZS																3																
Kimpuanza do Soyo	ZAI																4																
Kwanza Textil do Dondo	CZN																5																
Leões de Luanda	LUA															1																	
Luta Sport Clube	CAB			5																													
Nacional de Benguela	BEN															3																	
Petro de Luanda	LUA				1																												
Petro do Huambo	HUA	CH																															
Primeiro de Maio	BEN		1																														
Primeiro de Maio	LDN				3																												
Progresso do Sambizanga	LUA			1																													
Recreativo da Caála	HUA		2													2																	
Sagrada Esperança	LDN							1																									
União Petro do Bié	BIE	2																															
Veículos de Malanje	MAL																	2															
Zebras do Bengo	BGO																6																
Years		1981				1982				1983			1984			1985			1986			1987			1988			1989			1990		

== List of champions and series winners ==
Year	League champion
2019	Ferroviário do Huambo
2018	ASA
2017	Domant FC
2016	Santa Rita de Cássia
2015	Primeiro de Maio
2014	Académica do Lobito
2013	Sporting de Cabinda
2012	Porcelana
2011	Sporting de Cabinda
1980	Petro do Huambo

Year	Serie A winner
2018	ASA
2017	Domant FC
2016	Santa Rita de Cássia
2015	Porcelana FC
2014	Domant FC
2013	Sporting de Cabinda
2012	Porcelana
2011	Sporting de Cabinda
2010	Progresso do Sambizanga
2009	Sporting de Cabinda
2008	Académica do Soyo
2007	Kabuscorp
2006	Santos FC
2005	Académica do Soyo
2004	Benfica de Luanda
2003	Académica do Soyo
2002	Progresso do Sambizanga
2001	Sporting de Cabinda

Year	Serie B winner
2018	Bikuku FC
2017	Casa Militar
2016	Bravos do Maquis
2015	Primeiro de Maio
2014	Académica do Lobito
2013	Benfica do Lubango
2012	Desportivo da Huíla
2011	Atlético do Namibe
2010	Primeiro de Maio
2009	Benfica do Lubango
2008	Recreativo da Caála
2007	Bravos do Maquis
2006	Petro do Huambo
2005	Benfica do Lubango
2004	Desportivo da Huíla
2003	Benfica do Lubango
2002	1º de Maio
2001	Desportivo da Huíla

Year	Serie C winner
2017	–
2016	–
2015	–
2014	Progresso da Lunda Sul
2013	União do Uíge
2012	
2011	
2010	
2009	Sagrada Esperança
2008	
2007	
2006	Inter do Moxico
2005	Ritondo de Malanje
2004	Sporting do Bié
2003	Bravos do Maquis
2002	Ritondo de Malanje
2001	Sporting do Bié

== Titles by team ==
Rank	Club	Year
2 Titles
1	Sporting de Cabinda	2011, 2013
1 Title
2	Ferroviário do Huambo	2019
2	ASA	2018
2	Domant FC	2017
2	Santa Rita de Cássia	2016
2	Primeiro de Maio	2015
2	Académica do Lobito	2014
2	Porcelana FC	2012
2	Petro do Huambo	1980
2	Rendonda FC	2025
2	São salvador do Kongo	2023
2	Recreativo da Caála	2026

== See also ==
- Girabola
- Taça de Angola
- Supertaça de Angola
