= 2017 Girabola =

Girabola
- Season: 2017
- Champions: Primeiro de Agosto
- Relegated: ASA; Santa Rita de Cássia; Progresso Lunda Sul
- Champions League: Primeiro de Agosto
- Matches: 240
- Goals: 268 (1.12 per match)
- Top goalscorer: Tiago Azulão (16)
- Biggest home win: 2 matches: Sagrada 6-0 J.G.M. (11 Mar); Libolo 6-0 J.G.M. (19 Apr)
- Biggest away win: 2 matches: Académica 0-3 Kabuscorp (12 Feb); 1º Maio 0-3 1º Agosto (24 Feb)
- Highest scoring: 6 matches: Sagrada 6-0 J.G.M. (11 Mar); 1º Maio 4-2 Académica (12 Mar); Académica 2-4 Sagrada (2 Apr); Libolo 6-0 J.G.M. (19 Apr); 1º Maio 2-4 Sagrada (23 Apr); Petro 5-1 Sagrada (6 May)
- Longest winning run: Sagrada Esperança (6) (19 Mar–29 Apr)
- Longest unbeaten run: 1º de Agosto (14) (18 Jun–29 Oct)
- Longest winless run: Santa Rita (14) (5 Mar–1 Jul)
- Longest losing run: Académica (5) (5 Mar–2 Apr); ASA (5) (21 Apr–14 May); Santa Rita (5) (22 Apr–19 May)
- All statistics correct as of 21 May 2017.

The 2017 Girabola was the 39th season of top-tier football in Angola. The season ran from 10 February to 5 November 2017.

The league comprised 16 teams and the bottom three teams were relegated to the 2018 Provincial stages.

== Teams ==
A total of 16 teams contested the league, including 13 sides from the 2016 season and three promoted from the 2016 Segundona - Bravos do Maquis, J.G.M. and Santa Rita de Cássia.

On the other hand, 4 de Abril do K.K., Porcelana F.C. and Primeiro de Maio were the last three teams of the 2016 season and played in the Segundona for the 2018 season. Clube Desportivo Primeiro de Agosto were the defending champions from the 2016 season.

On January 23, 2017, Benfica de Luanda issued a press release stating that it would no longer participate in the Girabola, with effect from 2017 and until further notice, citing financial reasons, and that the club would focus on its youth academy and in turning the club into a sports company.

For the repechage to fill the spot of Benfica de Luanda, a round-robin qualifier tournament was announced to be contested by the three relegated teams in the 2016 Girabola plus the two top-ranked teams in the 2016 Segundona. As four of the five invited teams declined to participate on financial grounds, Primeiro de Maio was selected to replace Benfica de Luanda.

== Estádio 4 de Janeiro disaster ==
On February 10, 2017, during the inaugural match between home team Santa Rita de Cássia and Recreativo do Libolo, one of the access gates of Estádio 4 de Janeiro collapsed as supporters tried to force their way into the stadium. As a result, 17 people were trampled to death and 76 injured, 5 of whom with life-threatening injuries. The incident began just about 6 minutes from the beginning of the match with the match pursuing its normal course until the end and no one inside the stadium realizing what was going on. The Police has reportedly used tear gas to disperse angry supporters.

== Changes from 2016 season ==
Relegated: 4 de Abril do Cuando, Porcelana, 1º de Maio
Promoted: Bravos do Maquis, Desportivo JGM, Santa Rita de Cássia
Withdrew: Benfica de Luanda
Nominated: 1º de Maio

== Progresso da Lunda Sul relegation ==
Progresso da Lunda Sul was relegated for fielding an ineligible player on its 29th round match against Académica do Lobito. As the club was struggling with financial trouble, they had initially been awarded a 3-0 defeat in their round 20 home match against Progresso do Sambizanga.

=== Stadiums and locations ===
Locations of the 2017 Girabola teams

Team	Home city	Stadium	Capacity	2016 season
Académica do Lobito	Lobito	Estádio do Buraco	15,000	12th in Girabola
ASA	Luanda	Estádio dos Coqueiros	12,000	13th in Girabola
Bravos do Maquis	Luena	Estádio Mundunduleno	4,300	2nd in Segundona
Desportivo da Huíla	Lubango	Estádio do Ferroviário da Huíla	25,000	10th in Girabola
Interclube	Luanda	Estádio 22 de Junho	7,000	7th in Girabola
J.G.M.	Huambo	Estádio dos Kurikutelas	5,000	3rd in Segundona
Kabuscorp	Luanda	Estádio dos Coqueiros	12,000	5th in Girabola
Petro de Luanda	Luanda	Estádio 11 de Novembro	50,000	2nd in Girabola
Primeiro de Agosto	Luanda	Estádio 11 de Novembro	50,000	Girabola Champions
Primeiro de Maio	Benguela	Estádio Edelfride Costa	6,000	15th in Girabola
Progresso do Sambizanga	Luanda	Estádio dos Coqueiros	12,000	8th in Girabola
Progresso da Lunda Sul	Saurimo	Estádio das Mangueiras	7,000	4th in Girabola
Recreativo da Caála	Caála	Estádio Mártires da Canhala	12,000	11th in Girabola
Recreativo do Libolo	Calulo	Estádio Municipal	10,000	3rd in Girabola
Sagrada Esperança	Dundo	Estádio Sagrada Esperança	8,000	9th in Girabola
Santa Rita de Cássia	Uíge	Estádio 4 de Janeiro	12,000	1st in Segundona

== League table ==
Pos	Team	Pld	W	D	L	GF	GA	GD	Pts	Qualification or relegation
1	Primeiro de Agosto (C)	30	19	8	3	44	14	+30	65	Qualification for Champions League
2	Petro de Luanda	30	20	2	8	46	20	+26	62	
3	Sagrada Esperança	30	15	8	7	34	23	+11	53	
4	Kabuscorp	30	13	11	6	40	29	+11	50	
5	Recreativo do Libolo	30	13	9	8	41	23	+18	48	
6	Interclube	30	12	12	6	34	19	+15	48	
7	Progresso do Sambizanga	30	11	8	11	34	30	+4	41	
8	Recreativo da Caála	30	12	5	13	24	27	−3	41	
9	Desportivo da Huíla	30	11	8	11	23	28	−5	41	
10	Primeiro de Maio	30	12	4	14	41	49	−8	40	
11	Bravos do Maquis	30	8	9	13	19	26	−7	33	
12	Académica do Lobito	30	8	6	16	39	52	−13	30	
13	J.G.M.	30	8	6	16	26	55	−29	30	
14	ASA (R)	30	6	8	16	20	37	−17	26	Relegation to Provincial stages
15	Santa Rita (R)	30	4	8	18	24	46	−22	20	Relegation to Provincial stages
16	Progresso LS (D)	30	8	8	14	28	39	−11	32	Disqualified

Updated to match(es) played on 3 November 2017. Source: Girabola.com
Rules for classification: 1) Points; 2) Head-to-head points; 3) Head-to-head goal difference; 4) Goal difference; 5) Goals scored; 6) Fair-play points; 7) Play-off.
(C) Champions; (D) Disqualified; (R) Relegated

== Results ==
Home \ Away	ACA	ASA	BMQ	DHL	INT	JGM	KAB	PET	PRI	PRL	PRM	PRO	RCA	RLB	SAG	SRC
Académica do Lobito	—	4–1	2–1	0–2	1–2	1–1	0–3	0–2	1–1	2–1	1–3	1–0	2–1	1–2	2–4	4–0
ASA	2–0	—	1–1	1–0	1–1	2–1	1–2	1–2	0–1	1–1	2–1	0–0	1–2	0–1	0–0	2–2
Bravos do Maquis	3–1	0–1	—	0–0	1–1	3–0	0–1	1–0	0–1	1–0	0–1	1–0	0–1	1–0	0–1	1–0
Desportivo da Huíla	1–2	0–0	1–0	—	1–0	2–0	1–0	2–0	0–2	0–1	1–0	1–1	0–0	2–1	1–1	0–0
Interclube	1–1	0–1	1–0	0–0	—	3–0	0–0	2–0	1–1	4–0	1–0	1–1	2–0	1–0	0–0	2–0
J.G.M.	1–1	2–1	1–1	1–2	1–1	—	1–0	0–1	0–4	0–3	1–2	0–1	2–0	1–1	3–0	1–0
Kabuscorp	1–1	1–0	1–1	2–1	3–2	1–0	—	2–1	2–0	1–1	2–2	1–2	0–1	2–2	2–0	3–1
Petro de Luanda	4–2	2–0	2–0	1–0	2–0	3–0	1–1	—	0–0	1–0	4–1	2–1	3–0	1–0	5–1	4–2
Primeiro de Agosto	2–0	2–0	2–0	3–0	1–0	2–0	1–1	1–0	—	2–1	2–1	4–0	0–0	1–0	1–0	1–0
Progresso da Lunda Sul	3–2	2–0	0–0	2–0	0–1	1–1	1–1	0–1	1–2	—	2–0	0–3	1–0	1–2	0–0	3–2
Primeiro de Maio	4–2	1–0	0–0	4–1	1–2	2–4	1–1	1–0	0–3	2–1	—	2–0	1–2	1–4	2–4	3–2
Progresso do Sambizanga	1–1	1–1	4–0	1–2	0–0	1–2	2–3	0–2	0–0	4–0	2–2	—	2–0	1–0	1–0	1–0
Recreativo da Caála	1–0	2–0	0–0	3–0	0–3	0–1	2–0	0–1	1–1	3–0	0–1	1–0	—	0–3	1–0	3–0
Recreativo do Libolo	2–1	3–0	2–1	1–1	1–1	6–0	0–0	1–0	2–2	1–1	3–0	0–1	1–0	—	0–0	1–1
Sagrada Esperança	2–1	1–0	0–0	1–0	1–0	6–0	2–1	1–0	1–0	0–0	2–0	1–2	2–0	1–0	—	1–0
Santa Rita	0–2	1–0	1–2	0–1	1–1	4–1	1–1	0–1	1–1	2–1	0–1	2–1	0–0	0–1	1–1	—

Updated to match(es) played on 21 May 2017. Source: girabola.com
Legend: Blue = home team win; Yellow = draw; Red = away team win.

=== Positions by round ===
Team ╲ Round	1	2	3	4	5	6	7	8	9	10	11	12	13	14	15	16	17	18	19	20	21	22	23	24	25	26	27	28	29	30
1º de Agosto	9	15	4	2	1	1	2	2	2	1	4	2	1	1	2	2	2	1	2	2	1	1	2	1	2	1	1	1	1	1
Petro de Luanda	2	7	5	4	3	4	3	3	4	3	2	4	3	2	1	1	1	2	1	1	2	2	1	2	1	2	2	2	2	2
Sagrada Esperança	2	3	2	6	4	5	5	4	3	4	3	1	4	4	4	4	4	4	3	4	4	4	3	4	4	4	4	3	3	3
Kabuscorp	1	1	1	1	2	2	1	1	1	2	1	3	2	3	3	3	3	3	4	3	3	3	4	3	3	3	3	4	5	4
Interclube	11	5	10	9	11	8	6	7	8	8	6	6	8	9	8	8	8	8	8	7	7	7	7	7	6	5	6	5	6	5
Recreativo do Libolo	2	2	3	3	6	7	8	8	7	7	5	5	5	5	6	5	5	5	5	6	6	6	5	5	5	6	5	6	4	6
Recreativo da Caála	2	5	11	5	5	3	4	5	6	6	8	8	7	7	7	7	7	7	7	8	8	8	8	8	8	8	9	9	7	7
Desportivo da Huíla	7	13	6	10	12	9	11	9	9	9	10	10	10	10	10	11	10	9	9	11	11	9	10	10	10	9	8	7	8	8
Progresso	11	10	7	7	7	6	7	6	5	5	7	7	6	6	5	6	6	6	6	5	5	5	6	6	7	7	7	8	9	9
1º de Maio	11	10	15	16	10	13	10	11	11	13	13	13	11	11	11	10	9	10	11	9	9	10	9	9	9	10	10	10	10	10
Bravos do Maquis	2	3	7	7	8	11	9	10	10	10	9	9	9	8	9	9	11	11	10	10	10	11	11	11	11	11	11	11	11	11
Progresso Lunda Sul	11	13	14	15	16	16	16	15	12	11	11	12	13	14	14	13	13	13	13	13	13	15	15	15	15	13	13	13	12	12
Académica do Lobito	16	12	9	11	13	15	15	16	13	14	14	15	14	12	13	14	14	14	14	15	14	12	13	12	12	12	12	12	13	13
J.G.M.	9	9	15	14	15	10	13	14	16	16	15	11	12	13	12	15	15	15	15	14	15	15	14	14	14	15	15	15	14	14
ASA	7	8	13	13	14	14	14	13	15	12	12	14	15	15	15	12	12	12	12	12	12	13	12	13	13	14	14	14	15	15
Santa Rita	11	16	12	12	9	12	12	12	14	15	16	16	16	16	16	16	16	16	16	16	16	16	16	16	16	16	16	16	16	16

Leader (2018 CAF Champions League)
Relegation to 2018 Provincial stages

Source: Girabola

=== Clubs season progress ===
Team ╲ Round	1	2	3	4	5	6	7	8	9	10	11	12	13	14	15	16	17	18	19	20	21	22	23	24	25	26	27	28	29	30
Académica Lobito	L	D	W	L	L	L	L	L	W	L	D	L	D	W	L	D	D	L	D	L	W	W	L	W	L	W	L	L	L	W
ASA	D	D	L	D	L	D	D	L	W	L	L	L	L	L	W	W	W	D	L	D	L	W	L	D	L	L	W	L	L	L
Bravos do Maquis	W	D	L	D	L	L	W	L	D	L	W	W	L	W	L	D	L	D	W	D	L	L	D	L	D	W	L	W	L	D
Desportivo da Huíla	D	L	W	L	L	W	L	W	L	D	L	D	D	W	L	L	W	W	D	L	L	W	D	D	W	W	W	W	D	L
Interclube	L	W	L	D	W	W	D	D	D	W	D	L	D	L	W	D	D	W	W	D	W	W	L	L	W	W	D	W	D	D
J.G.M.	D	L	L	D	L	W	L	L	D	L	D	W	L	L	W	L	D	L	L	W	L	L	W	D	L	L	L	W	W	W
Kabuscorp	W	W	W	W	D	W	W	D	D	D	W	D	W	L	W	D	L	D	L	W	D	L	D	W	D	W	D	L	L	W
Petro de Luanda	W	L	W	W	W	L	W	W	D	W	W	L	W	W	W	W	D	W	W	W	L	W	W	L	W	L	W	L	W	L
1º de Agosto	W	W	D	W	W	W	L	W	D	W	D	W	W	W	L	W	D	W	D	W	W	W	D	W	D	W	D	W	W	L
1º de Maio	L	D	L	L	W	L	W	L	D	L	L	D	W	W	L	W	W	L	W	L	L	L	W	W	W	L	D	W	L	W
Progresso L. Sul	L	D	L	L	L	L	W	L	W	D	D	L	L	L	W	D	D	W	D	L	L	L	L	D	D	W	W	L	L	W
Progresso	L	D	W	D	W	D	L	W	W	L	D	D	W	W	W	L	L	D	D	W	W	L	W	L	D	L	L	L	W	L
Recreativo da Caála	W	L	D	W	W	W	D	L	L	L	W	W	W	L	L	L	D	W	D	D	L	W	L	W	L	L	L	W	W	L
Recreativo do Libolo	W	W	L	W	D	W	W	D	D	W	W	D	L	W	D	D	L	W	D	L	W	D	L	D	W	L	W	L	W	L
Sagrada Esperança	W	D	W	L	W	L	W	W	W	W	W	W	L	L	D	D	D	D	W	L	W	L	W	D	D	W	D	W	L	W
Santa Rita	L	L	W	D	D	L	D	L	L	D	L	L	L	L	L	D	L	W	D	L	W	L	D	L	L	L	D	L	L	W

== Season statistics ==
=== Top scorers ===
As of 23 August 2017

Rank	Scorer	Club	Goals
1	(Brazil) Tiago Azulão	Petro de Luanda	16
2	(Angola) Kaporal	1º de Maio	12
3	(Cape Verde) Rambé	1º de Agosto	11
4	(Angola) Fofó	Progresso	10
4	(Democratic Republic of the Congo) Jiresse	Académica do Lobito	10
5	(Democratic Republic of the Congo) Jacques	Kabuscorp	9
5	(Angola) Paizinho	Recreativo do Libolo	9
6	(Brazil) Tony	Petro de Luanda	8

==== Hat-tricks ====
Player	For	Against	Result	Ref	Date
(Angola) Fofó	Progresso	Bravos do Maquis	4-0		5 May 2017
(Angola) Germano	Académica do Lobito	Santa Rita	4-0		10 September 2017
(Zambia) Chileshe	Progresso Lunda Sul	J.G.M.	0-3		4 October 2017

2017 Girabola winner

11th title

Squad:
Julião, Nuno, Tony Cabaça (GK)
Bobo, Dani, Isaac, Natael, Paizo, Sargento (DF)
Buá, Catraio, Diogo, Gogoró, Gui, Ibukun, Macaia, Manucho, Meda, Mingo Bile, Nelson, Show (MF)
Geraldo, Guelor, Vado, Vanilson (FW)
Dragan Jović (Head Coach)

Top Scorer
