= Domant FC =

Angolan sports club

- Full name: Domant Futebol Clube de Bula Atumba
- Founded: 23 May 2005; 21 years ago
- Ground: Estádio Municipal do Dande; Caxito, Angola
- Capacity: 5,000
- Chairman: Domingos António
- Manager: Gil Martins
- League: Segundona
- 2018/19: 6th
Home colours	Away colours

Domant Futebol Clube de Bula Atumba is an Angolan sports club from the village of Bula Atumba, in the northern province of Bengo. The team currently plays in the Gira Angola and is based in the province's capital city of Caxito.

== History ==
The club has its origins in the early 1990s in another club called Desportivo da Vidrul which was sponsored by a glass factory called Vidrul. By then, the team was led by Mr. Domingos António, a young man in his 20s who managed to keep the club alive by taking part in several local competitions. Ever since, the team went through various changes until being established on 23 May 2005, as Domant FC. On 6 December 2006, the team took part in the President's Cup (the equivalent in Angola to the 3rd division championship).

In 2014, Domant FC became the first ever team from the province of Bengo to play in Girabola.

In 2017, the club qualified for the Angolan top division, the Girabola, for the second time.

== Achievements ==
- Angolan League: 0

- Angolan Cup: 0

- Angolan SuperCup: 0

- Gira Angola: 0

== Recent seasons ==
Domant FC's season-by-season performance since 2011:

Overall match statistics
Season	Pld	W	D	L	GF	GA	GD	%
2016	19	13	4	2	70	9	+61	0.737
2015	33	7	4	22	31	59	–28	0.545

Classifications
L3	L2	L1	AC	SC	CL	CC
1st	3b		SF	–	–	–
		16th	QF	–	–	–

Top season scorers
Player	LG	AC	SC	CL	CC	T
–	–	?				–
Abel, David	9	?				9

- PR = Preliminary round, 1R = First round, GS = Group stage, R32 = Round of 32, R16 = Round of 16, QF = Quarter-finals, SF = Semi-finals

== Players and staff ==
=== Staff ===
Name	Nat	Pos
Technical staff
Eduardo Passe Fernandes	(Angola)	Head coach
António Liga	(Angola)	Assistant coach
Lázaro Miguel	(Angola)	Goalkeeper coach
Medical
Bernardo Adão	(Angola)	Physician
Alex Sanchez	(Spain)	Physio
António Daniel Toy	(Angola)	Physio
Cláudia Manuel	(Angola)	Physio
Management
Domingos António	(Angola)	Chairman
Adolfo Aparício	(Angola)	Vice-chairman
Jorge Paulo	(Angola)	Manager

== Manager history and performance ==
Season	Coach	L2	L1	C	Coach	L2	L1	C	Coach	L2	L1	C
2010	(Angola) Manuel de Carvalho Louras											
2011	(Angola) Manuel de Carvalho Louras											
2012	(Angola) Paulo Saraiva											
2013	(Angola) Paulo Saraiva											
2014	(Angola) Luís Quintas				(Angola) Paulo Saraiva							
2015	(Angola) Paulo Saraiva				(Spain) Juan Oliva				(Angola) Manuel Oliveira Nguami			
2016
2017	(Angola) Francisco André Kito	1st										
2018	(Angola) Francisco André Kito				(Angola) Eduardo Fernandes				(Angola) Pedro Manuel Mawete			
2019	(Angola) Gil Martins											

== See also ==
- Girabola
- Gira Angola
