= 2016 Segundona =

- Champions: Sta Rita de Cássia
- Matches played: 35
- Goals scored: 80 (2.29 per match)
- Biggest home win: B. Maquis 4-0 J.Garcia (16 Jul 2016); C.Militar 4-0 J.Garcia (7 Aug 2016)
- Highest scoring: Polivalente 3-3 C.Militar (3 Sep 2016)
- Longest winning run: Bravos Maquis (3)
- Longest unbeaten run: Bravos Maquis (8)
- Longest winless run: Polivalente (8)
- Longest losing run: Polivalente (2); Santa Rita (2)

The 2016 Segundona is the 22nd season of the second-tier football league in Angola. The season ran from 10 July to October 2016.

The league comprises 2 series of 5 teams, the winner of each series being automatically promoted to the 2017 Girabola while the runners-up of each group will contest for the third spot. At the end of the regular season, the three series winners will play a round-robin tournament to determine the league champion.

== Stadiums and locations ==
Locations of the 2016 Segundona teams

P	Team	Home city	Stadium	Capacity	2015
2	Bravos do Maquis	Luena	Estádio Mundunduleno	4,300	14th in Girabola
6	Cabinda Sport Clube	Cabinda	Estádio do Chiazi	25,000	DNP
5	Casa Militar (Note: Later changed its name to Cuando Cubango FC)	Menongue	Campo Municipal	5,000	5th in Segundona, Gr B
5	Domant FC	Caxito	Estádio Municipal	5,000	16th in Girabola
3	J.G.M.	Huambo	Estádio dos Kurikutelas	7,000	4th in Segundona, Gr B
6	Jackson Garcia	Benguela	Estádio de S. Filipe	5,000	3rd in Segundona, Gr B
7	Polivalente do Kwanza Sul	Sumbe	Estádio Hoji Ya Henda	3,000	DNP
1	Santa Rita de Cássia	Uíge	Estádio 4 de Janeiro	12,000	DNP
4	Sporting de Cabinda	Cabinda	Estádio do Chiazi	25,000	15th in Girabola

== Serie A ==
=== Table and results ===
Pos	Team	Pld	W	D	L	GF	GA	GD	Pts	Qualification or relegation	SRC	SCC	DOM	CSC	NGM
1	Santa Rita (C)	7	5	0	2	12	7	+5	15	Qualification for Girabola		3–0	1–2	0–0	–
2	Sporting de Cabinda	6	1	0	5	3	13	−10	3	Qualification for Girabola playoff	0–1		1–0	1–1	–
3	Domant FC	6	1	4	1	6	6	0	7		0–0	1–1		2–2	–
4	Cabinda SC	6	1	4	1	6	6	0	7		1–0	1–2	1–1		–
5	Ngueto Maka (Note: Ngueto Maka were disqualified following a second loss by default.) (D)	7	3	0	4	12	11	+1	0	Disqualified	–	–	–	–	

Updated to match(es) played on 30 July 2016. Source: Girabola.com
Rules for classification: 1) Points; 2) Head-to-head points; 3) Head-to-head goal difference; 4) Goal difference; 5) Goals scored; 6) Fair-play points; 7) Play-off.
(C) Champions; (D) Disqualified

=== Match details ===
Round 1

Sun, 01 Jul 2016	Sporting Cabinda	0–1	Santa Rita	Cabinda
15:00				Stadium: Estádio do Tafe

Round 7

Sat, 20 Aug 2016	Cabinda SC	1–1	Domant FC	Cabinda
15:00				Stadium: Estádio do Tafe

Round 2

Sun, 17 Jul 2016	Domant FC	1–1	Sporting Cabinda	Caxito
15:00				Stadium: Estádio Municipal

Round 8

Sun, 21 Aug 2016	Santa Rita	3–0	Sporting Cabinda	Uíge
15:00	Roblin 53' (pen.); Vemba 55' (pen.); Godzilla 88'			Stadium: 4 de Janeiro

Round 3

Sat, 23 Jul 2016	Domant FC	2–2	Cabinda SC	Caxito
15:00				Stadium: Estádio Municipal

Round 9

Sun, 04 Sep 2016	Domant FC	0–0	Santa Rita	Caxito
15:00		Report		Stadium: Estádio Municipal; Referee: Avelino Chivela, José Fernando, Lucas Calhonga

Round 4

Sat, 30 Jul 2016	Cabinda SC	1–2	Sporting Cabinda	Cabinda
15:00				Stadium: Estádio do Tafe

Round 10

Sun, 04 Sep 2016	Sporting Cabinda	1–1	Cabinda SC	Cabinda
15:00				Stadium: Estádio do Tafe

Round 5

Sun, 31 Jul 2016	Santa Rita	1–2	Domant FC	Uíge
15:00	Béu 13'	Report	11' (pen.) Vemba; 60' Neymar	Stadium: 4 de Janeiro

Round 11

Sun, 18 Sep 2016	Sporting Cabinda	1–0	Domant FC	Cabinda
15:00				Stadium: Estádio do Tafe

Round 6

Sat, 06 Aug 2016	Cabinda SC	1–0	Santa Rita	Cabinda
15:00				Stadium: Estádio do Tafe

Round 12

Sun, 18 Sep 2016	Santa Rita	0–0	Cabinda SC	Uíge
15:00				Stadium: 4 de Janeiro

== Serie B ==
=== Table and results ===
Pos	Team	Pld	W	D	L	GF	GA	GD	Pts	Qualification or relegation	BRA	JGM	CAS	JAC	POL
1	Bravos do Maquis	8	5	3	0	14	7	+7	18	Qualification for Girabola		1–0	3–2	3–0	3–2
2	J.G.M.	8	4	1	3	9	7	+2	13	Qualification for Girabola playoff	0–1		1–0	3–0	1–0
3	Casa Militar (Note: Later changed their name to Cuando Cubango FC)	8	2	3	3	14	12	+2	9 (Note: Head-to-head results: C. Militar 4 J. Garcia 0; J. Garcia 2 C. Militar 0.)		2–2	3–1		4–0	0–0
4	Jackson Garcia	8	2	3	3	5	12	−7	9		0–0	1–1	2–0		1–0
5	Polivalente KS	8	0	4	4	8	12	−4	4		1–1	1–2	3–3	1–1	

Updated to match(es) played on 30 July 2016. Source: Girabola.com
Rules for classification: 1) Points; 2) Head-to-head points; 3) Head-to-head goal difference; 4) Goal difference; 5) Goals scored; 6) Fair-play points; 7) Play-off.

=== Match details ===
Round 1

Sat, 09 Jul 2016	J.G.M.	1–0	Casa Militar	Huambo
15:00	Gudes 53'			Stadium: Kurikutelas

Sun, 10 Jul 2016	Jackson Garcia	1–0	Polivalente KS	Benguela
15:00	Bijú 25'			Stadium: São Filipe

Round 6

Sat, 20 Aug 2016	Casa Militar	3–1	J.G.M.	Menongue
15:00				Stadium: Estádio Municipal

Sun, 21 Aug 2016	Polivalente KS	1–1	Jackson Garcia	Sumbe
15:00				Stadium: Hoji Ya Henda

Round 2

Sat, 16 Jul 2016	Bravos Maquis	3–0	Jackson Garcia	Luena
15:00	Pick 12'; Vado 22'; Luciano 59'	Report		Stadium: Mundunduleno

Sat, 16 Jul 2016	Polivalente KS	1–2	J.G.M.	Sumbe
15:00	Zalambila 77'	Report	4' Kilombo; 90+3' Deco	Stadium: Hoji Ya Henda; Referee: Pedro Culembe, Celestino Hossi, Zacaria Culembe

Round 7

Sat, 27 Aug 2016	Jackson Garcia	0–0	Bravos Maquis	Benguela
15:00				Stadium: São Filipe

Sat, 27 Aug 2016	J.G.M.	1–0	Polivalente KS	Huambo
15:00	Kilombo 3'			Stadium: Kurikutelas

Round 3

Sat, 23 Jul 2016	J.G.M.	0–1	Bravos Maquis	Huambo
15:00			84' (pen.) Ávalos	Stadium: Kurikutelas

Sun, 24 Jul 2016	Casa Militar	0–0	Polivalente KS	Menongue
15:00				Stadium: Estádio Municipal

Round 8

Sat, 03 Sep 2016	Bravos Maquis	1–0	J.G.M.	Luena
15:00	Marcelo 9'	Report		Stadium: Mundunduleno; Referee: Sabino de Carvalho, António Cirilo, Pedro Micolo

Sat, 03 Sep 2016	Polivalente KS	3–3	Casa Militar	Sumbe
15:00				Stadium: Hoji Ya Henda

Round 4

Sat, 30 Jul 2016	Bravos Maquis	3–2	Casa Militar	Luena
15:00				Stadium: Mundunduleno

Sun, 31 Jul 2016	Jackson Garcia	1–1	J.G.M.	Benguela
15:00	Bijú 90+4'		80' Jeovani	Stadium: São Filipe

Round 9

Sun, 11 Sep 2016	Casa Militar	2–2	Bravos Maquis	Menongue
15:00				Stadium: Estádio Municipal

Sun, 11 Sep 2016	J.G.M.	3–0	Jackson Garcia	Huambo
15:00	Deco ?'; Kilombo ?', ?'			Stadium: Kurikutelas

Round 5

Sat, 06 Aug 2016	Polivalente KS	1–1	Bravos Maquis	Sumbe
15:00				Stadium: Hoji Ya Henda

Sun, 07 Aug 2016	Casa Militar	4–0	Jackson Garcia	Menongue
15:00				Stadium: Estádio Municipal

Round 10

Sun, 18 Sep 2016	Bravos Maquis	3–2	Polivalente KS	Luena
15:00	Vado I 34', 55'; Ikuma 90+4'	Report	84' (pen.) Zalambila; 90+4' Dewiwi	Stadium: Mundunduleno; Referee: Donaciano Munumba, Txibuabua Lihamo, Alzandra Capola

Sun, 18 Sep 2016	Jackson Garcia	2–0	Casa Militar	Benguela
15:00				Stadium: São Filipe

== 2017 Girabola playoff ==
Sat, 1 Oct 2016	Sporting Cabinda	1–0 (1–0 agg.)	J.G.M. Huambo	Cabinda
15:00	Gláucio II 42'			Stadium: Estádio 4 de Janeiro; Referee: Yuri de Melo, Bedilson Buy, Rafael Miguel

Sat, 8 Oct 2016	J.G.M. Huambo	2–0 (2–1 agg.)	Sporting Cabinda	Huambo
15:00	Cubano 63'; Kilombo 90+7' (yellow card) 90+30'; Calú (yellow card) 90+23'	Report	(yellow card) 31' Manucho; (yellow card) 45' Venâncio	Stadium: Kurikutelas; Referee: Bernardo Nango, Jeremias Cafussa, Daniel Luvungo

== 2016 Segundona title match ==
Sat, 15 Oct 2016	Santa Rita	3–2	Bravos Maquis	Luanda
15:00	Vemba 9' (pen.); Abel 37'; Vemba 70'		29' Ikuma; 74' Betinho	Stadium: Estádio dos Coqueiros; Referee: João Mavungo, Alberto Dumbi, Evaristo Baku

2016 Segundona winner
Santa Rita de Cássia FC
1st title

Squad: Abel, Alberto, Bissio, Bruno, Cristiano, Gazeta, Godzilla, Hugo, Iniesta, Joel, Kiná, Milinga, Ministro, Paulo, Pira, Roblin, Vata, Vemba, Yuri, Yuyú
Head coach: Paulo Saraiva

== See also ==
- 2016 Girabola
