= Sporting Clube de Cabinda =

Angolan football club

- Full name: Sporting Clube Petróleos de Cabinda
- Nickname: Os Leões do Norte
- Ground: Estádio do Tafe; Cabinda, Angola
- Capacity: 5,000
- Chairman: Manuel Luís Coelho
- Manager: Emena Kwazambi
- League: First Division
- 2022–23: 12th

Sporting Clube Petróleos de Cabinda is an Angolan football club based in Cabinda. They play their home games at the Estádio do Chiazi or Estádio Municipal do Tafe..

== Achievements ==
- Angolan League: 0

- Angolan Cup: 0

- Angolan SuperCup: 0

- Angolan 2nd Division: 2 (2011, 2013)

== Recent seasons ==
Domant FC's season-by-season performance since 2011:

Overall match statistics
Season	Pld	W	D	L	GF	GA	GD	%
2016	9	3	2	4	6	10	–4	0.556
2015	31	7	10	14	31	47	–16	0.452

Classifications
L3	L2	L1	AC	SC
3rd	2b		PR	
		15th	R16	

Top season scorers
Player	L3	L2	L1	AC	SC	T
?	?	?		0		?
Jiresse			8	0		8

- PR = Preliminary round, 1R = First round, GS = Group stage, R32 = Round of 32, R16 = Round of 16, QF = Quarter-finals, SF = Semi-finals

== Players and staff ==
=== Staff ===
Name	Nat	Pos
Technical staff
Emena Kwazambi	(Angola)	Head coach
João Sapalo	(Angola)	Assistant coach
Jorge Chikomo	(Angola)	Goalkeeper coach
Medical
Sebastião Ngueve	(Angola)	Physician
Luís Chitula	(Angola)	Physio
Afonso Ndongala	(Angola)	Masseur
Management
Martim Nguli	(Angola)	Chairman
Orlando Sandambongo	(Angola)	Vice-chairman
Fernão Tchivango	(Angola)	Head of Foot Dept

== Manager history and performance ==
Season	Coach	L2	L1	C	Coach	L2	L1	C	Coach	L2	L1	C
1996	(Portugal) Jorge Gonçalves											
2002	(Republic of the Congo) Jean-Marie Claude Kenzo											
2003	(Angola) Carlos Alves				(Republic of the Congo) Alain Nguinda							
2004	(Angola) Arnaldo Chaves											
2005	(Angola) Arnaldo Chaves											
2006	(Republic of the Congo) Jean-Marie Claude Kenzo											
2007	(Angola) Ndunguidi Daniel											
2008	(Angola) Albano César											
2009	(Angola) Albano César											
2010	(Angola) Albano César				(Angola) Miguel Banganga				(Democratic Republic of the Congo) Alain Claude			
2011	(Democratic Republic of the Congo) Alain Claude											
2012	(Angola) Miguel Banganga				(Angola) Albano César							
2013	(Angola) Albano César	1st										
2014	(Angola) Albano César											
2015	(Angola) Emená Kwazambi				(Democratic Republic of the Congo) Médard Lusadisu							
2016	(Angola) Emená Kwazambi											
2017	(Angola) Emená Kwazambi											
2018	(Angola) Emená Kwazambi											
2018–19	(Angola) Emená Kwazambi											
2019–20	(Angola) Emená Kwazambi											

== See also ==
- Girabola
- Gira Angola
