= Progresso da Lunda Sul =

Angolan sports club

- Full name: Progresso da Lunda Sul
- Founded: 13 June 2002; 22 years ago
- Ground: Estádio das Mangueiras, Saurimo, Angola
- Capacity: 7,000
- Owner: Santos Bikuku
- Manager: N/A
- League: Girabola
- 2017: Disqualified
Home colours	Away colours

Progresso da Lunda Sul was an Angolan sports club from Saurimo, the capital city of Lunda Sul province. The club was an affiliate of Progresso do Sambizanga and shares the same outfit colours. Originally established as Progresso do Sambukila, the club changed its name in 2014 to its current denomination.

The club was owned by Angolan businessman Ernesto dos Santos Lino aka Santos Bikuku.

In 2014, the club won the 2014 Angolan second division Group B thus being promoted to the 2015 Girabola.

== Achievements ==
- Angolan League: 0

- Angolan Cup: 0

- Angolan SuperCup: 0

- Gira Angola: 0

== Recent seasons ==
Progresso da Lunda Sul's season-by-season performance since 2011:

Overall match statistics
Season	Pld	W	D	L	GF	GA	GD	%
2016	32	14	7	11	26	22	+4	0.609
2015	31	10	10	11	31	32	–1	0.500

Classifications
LG	AC	SC	CL	CC
4th	R16			
6th	PR			

Top season scorers
Player	LG	AC	SC	CL	CC	T
Mongo	10	0				10
Tshibuabua	8	0				8

- PR = Preliminary round, 1R = First round, GS = Group stage, R32 = Round of 32, R16 = Round of 16, QF = Quarter-finals, SF = Semi-finals

== Players and staff ==
=== Staff ===
Name	Nat	Pos
Technical staff
—	(Angola)	Head coach
—	(Angola)	Assistant coach
—	(Angola)	Goalkeeper coach
Medical
—	(Angola)	Physician
—	(Angola)	Physio
Management
Santos Bikuku	(Angola)	Owner

== Manager history and performance ==
Season	Coach	L2	L1	C	Coach	L2	L1	C
2014	(Angola) Kito Ribeiro	1st						
2015	(Angola) Kito Ribeiro		6th	R32				
2016	(Angola) Kito Ribeiro		4th	R16				
2017	(Angola) Paulo Figueiredo				Albano César			

== See also ==
- Girabola
- Gira Angola
