= J.G.M. A.S.C. Huambo =

Angolan sports club

J.G.M.
- Full name: Jorge Gomes Mangrinha; Académica Sport Clube do Huambo
- Founded: 12 May 1998; 27 years ago
- Ground: Estádio dos Kurikutelas
- Chairman: n/a
- Manager: n/a
- League: First Division
- 2018: Disqualified
Home colours	Away colours

Jorge Gomes Mangrinha Académica Sport Clube do Huambo best known as JGM is an Angolan sports club from the city of Huambo, in the namesake southern province. In 2016, the club participated for the second consecutive time in the Gira Angola (Angola's second division championship), after winning the Huambo province football championship.

The club is named after its owner, Angolan businessman Jorge Gomes Mangrinha.

== Achievements ==
- Angolan League: 0

- Angolan Cup: 0

- Angolan SuperCup: 0

- Gira Angola: 0

- Huambo provincial championship: 1

2015

== Recent seasons ==
J.G.M.'s season-by-season performance:

Overall match statistics
Season	Pld	W	D	L	GF	GA	GD	%
2016	11	5	1	5	12	9	+3	0.682
2015	8	1	3	4	7	16	–9	0.375

Classifications
L3	L2	L1	AC	SC
	2b		R16	
	4b		DNP	

Top season scorers
Player	L3	L2	L1	AC	SC	T
?		?		?		?
?		?				?

- PR = Preliminary round, 1R = First round, GS = Group stage, R32 = Round of 32, R16 = Round of 16, QF = Quarter-finals, SF = Semi-finals, RU = Runner-Up, W = Winner

== Staff ==
Name	Nat	Pos
Technical staff
—	(Angola)	Head coach
—	(Angola)	Assistant coach
—	(Angola)	Goal-keeper coach
Medical
—	(Angola)	Physio
Management
—	(Angola)	Chairman

== Manager history ==
Season	Coach	L2	L1	C	Coach	L2	L1	C
2016	(Angola) Águas Zeca da Silva	2nd		R16				
2017	(Angola) José Luís Borges				(Angola) Águas Zeca da Silva		14th	PR
2018	(Angola) Águas Zeca da Silva				(Angola) José Luís Borges			

== See also ==
- Girabola
- Gira Angola
