= G.D. Jackson Garcia =

Angolan sports club

Jackson Garcia FC
- Full name: Jackson Garcia Futebol Clube
- Founded: 2011 (15 years ago)
- Ground: Estádio de São Filipe; Benguela, Angola
- Capacity: 10,000; 35,000
- Chairman: Jackson Garcia
- Manager: Nelson Carraça
- League: Segundona
- 2018/2019: 2nd

Jackson Garcia Futebol Clube, is a sports club from Benguela, Angola. The club made its debut at the Gira Angola, the second division of Angolan football in 2014.

The club is named after club owner, Angolan businessman Jackson Garcia.

== Achievements ==
- Angolan League:

- Angolan Cup:

- Angolan SuperCup:

- Benguela provincial championship: 1

2015

== Staff ==
Name	Nat	Pos
Technical staff
Nelson Carraça	(Angola)	Head coach
Vunda Pascoal	(Angola)	Assistant Coach
	(Angola)	Goalkeeper Coach
Medical
	(Angola)	Physician
	(Angola)	Physio
Management
Jackson Garcia	(Angola)	Chairman
	(Angola)	Head of Foot Dept

== Manager history ==
(Angola) Nelson Firmino	(2014)	-

== See also ==
- Girabola
- Facebook
