= Cuando Cubango FC =

Angolan sports club

- Full name: Cuando Cubango Futebol Clube
- Founded: 12 May 2009; 16 years ago
- Ground: Estádio dos Eucaliptos
- Capacity: 4,000
- Chairman: Atanásio Lucas José
- Manager: Uxío Gómez
- League: First Division
- 2021–22: 10th
Home colours	Away colours

Cuando Cubango Futebol Clube or simply Cuando Cubango FC is an Angolan sports club from the city of Menongue, in the Angolan southern province of Cuando Cubango. The club was founded as Futebol Clube da Casa Militar.

In 2016, the team secured a place in the Gira Angola (Angola's second division championship) in 2016 after winning the Cuando Cubango province football championship.

In 2017, the club qualified for the Angolan top division, the Girabola.

In 2018, the club decided to change the name to Cuando Cubango Futebol Clube.

== Financial difficulties ==
On January 22, 2022, during the 2021-22 Girabola season, the club's management threatened to drop out of the competition, citing financial difficulties related to an expense of 300 million kwanzas, but revealing the club was working together with the government of the Cuando Cubango province to find a solution. Due to these circumstances, the club failed to attend an away game against Petro de Luanda, which resulted in a lost game, as per regulation.

Later, on 10 February, the Angolan government assured that, despite considering that the process of the club's founding was badly handled, Cuando Cubango FC would receive financial support until the end of the 2021-22 Girabola season.

== Achievements ==
- Angolan League: 0

- Angolan Cup: 0

- Angolan SuperCup: 0

- Gira Angola: 0

- Cuando Cubango provincial championship: 1

== Staff ==
Name	Nat	Pos
Technical staff
Hélder Teixeira	(Angola)	Head coach
Luís Quintas	(Angola)	Assistant coach
Aspirina	(Angola)	Assistant coach
Medical
—	(Angola)	Physician
—	(Angola)	Physio
Management
Atanásio José	(Angola)	Chairman
—	(Angola)	Head of Foot Dept

== Manager history ==
(Angola) Hélder Teixeira	2020-21
(Angola) Albano César	2019-20, 2020-21
(Angola) José Sousa	2018-19
(Angola) Abel da Conceição	2017, 2018, 2018-19
(Angola) Paulo Saraiva	2016

== See also ==
- Girabola
- Gira Angola
