= List of football clubs in Angola =

This is a list of association football clubs located in Angola. For a complete list, see Category:Football clubs in Angola

== # ==
- 4 de Abril

== A ==
- Academia de Futebol de Angola
- Académica do Lobito
- Académica do Soyo
- ASA
- ASK Dragão
- Atlético de Luanda
- Atlético do Namibe

== B ==
- Benfica de Luanda
- Benfica do Huambo
- Benfica do Lubango
- Bravos Do Maquis
- Brilhantes da Kissama

== C ==
- Construtores do Uíge
- Cuando Cubango FC

== D ==
- Desportivo da EKA
- Desportivo da Huíla
- Desportivo do Bengo
- Domant FC

== E ==
- Esperança do Congo
- Evale FC

== F ==
- Futebol Clube de Cabinda
- Futebol Clube de Luanda
- Futebol Clube do Moxico
- Ferroviário da Huíla
- Ferroviário do Huambo

== I ==
- Independente Sport Clube
- Inter da Huíla
- Interclube

== J ==
- Jackson Garcia
- Juventude do Moxico

== K ==
- Kabuscorp

== M ==
- Malanje Sport Clube
- Mpatu a Ponta

== N ==
- Nacional de Benguela
- Norberto de Castro

== P ==
- Petro de Luanda
- Petro do Huambo
- Polivalentes FC
- Porcelana FC
- Primeiro de Agosto
- Primeiro de Maio
- Progresso da Lunda Sul
- Progresso do Sambizanga

== R ==
- Real M'buco
- Recreativo da Caála
- Recreativo do Libolo
- Recreativo do Seles
- Renascimento

== S ==
- Sagrada Esperança
- Santa Rita de Cássia
- Santos FC
- Saurimo FC
- Sporting de Benguela
- Sporting de Cabinda
- Sporting do Bié

== U ==
- União do Uíge

== See also ==
- Girabola
- Gira Angola
