= List of G.D. Sagrada Esperança players =

Grupo Desportivo Sagrada Esperança is an Angolan football (soccer) club based in Dundo, Lunda Norte, Angola and plays at Estádio Sagrada Esperança. The club was established in 1976.

== 2020–2021 ==
G.D. Sagrada Esperança players 2020–2021

| Nat | # | Nick | Name | A | P | R.S. | Total Apps & Gls | | |
| Nat | # | Nick | Name | A | P | 2021 | Total Apps & Gls | | |
| Nat | # | Nick | Name | A | P | ^{C} | ^{S} | ^{A} | ^{G} |
|---|---|---|---|---|---|---|---|---|---|
| (Angola) | 26 | Água Doce | José Fernandes Mbuta | 26 | MF | 2021 | | | |
| (Angola) | 19 | Beni | Beni Kimbi Fua | 25 | FW | 2021 | | | |
| (Angola) | 21 | Cachi | Januário da Cruz Sesa | 30 | MF | 2021 | | | |
| (Angola) | 7 | Caranga | Jorge Mendes Corte-Real Carneiro | 29 | DF | 2021 | | | |
| (Angola) | 8 | Celson | Guilherme Francisco Saiendo Cabuço | 26 | MF | 2021 | | | |
| (Angola) | 11 | Chico | Carlos Francisco Diassonama Panzo Bunga | 30 | FW | 2021 | | | |
| (Angola) | – | Denilson | Denilson Faria Fernandes | | DF | 2021 | | | |
| (Angola) | 5 | Djo | Marcos Pedro Júnior | 30 | DF | 2021 | | | |
| (Angola) | 2 | Eliseu | Eliseu Manuel Calei | 25 | DF | 2021 | | | |
| (Nigeria) | 15 | Femi | Joseph Femi Olatubosun | 31 | MF | 2021 | | | |
| (Angola) | 6 | Gaspar | Kialonda Gaspar | 24 | DF | 2021 | | | |
| (Angola) | 27 | Jó Paciência | Joaquim Cristóvão Paciência | 25 | FW | 2021 | | | |
| (Angola) | 12 | Jotabé | João Baptista Missenga do Nascimento | 23 | GK | 2021 | | | |
| (Democratic Republic of the Congo) | 1 | Langanga | Landu Langanga | 25 | GK | 2021 | | | |
| (Angola) | 13 | Leonardo | Leonardo Armando Mutunda | 24 | GK | 2021 | | | |
| (Angola) | 16 | Lépua | Simone Eduardo Assa Miranda | 22 | FW | 2021 | | | |
| (Brazil) | 28 | Lima | Eric di Paula Lima | 31 | FW | 2021 | | | |
| (Angola) | 20 | Luís Tati | Luís Bumba Tati | 29 | DF | 2021 | | | |
| (Angola) | 25 | Lulas | Manuel Ngalula Sallo Cunha | 25 | DF | 2021 | | | |
| (Angola) | 22 | Manuel | | | GK | 2021 | | | |
| (Angola) | 14 | Matengó | Mateus Gaspar Domingos | 28 | MF | 2021 | | | |
| (Angola) | 17 | Muenho | Gervásio Domingos Calela | 27 | DF | 2021 | | | |
| (Timor-Leste) | 9 | Pedro Henriques | Pedro Henrique Cortes Oliveira Góis | 29 | FW | 2021 | | | |
| (Democratic Republic of the Congo) | 3 | Reginó | Mukendi Mbyia Regino | 30 | MF | 2021 | | | |
| (Angola) | 10 | Savané | Savane Aly Touré | 31 | MF | 2021 | | | |
| (Angola) | 4 | Simão | Rosalino Baleiro Veya | 30 | DF | 2021 | | | |
| (Angola) | 18 | Sozito | Mário Bernardo Keita | 25 | DF | 2021 | | | |
| (Angola) | 23 | Victoriano | Victoriano Naueji Lucoquessa Bucumba | 28 | DF | 2021 | | | |
| Years | | | | | | 2021 | | | |

== 2011–2020 ==
G.D. Sagrada Esperança players 2011–2020

| Nat | Nick | Name | A | P | M. Calado | | A. Caldas | | Z.M. | R.S. | Ekrem Asma | | | Roque Sapiri | | | A. Tramagal | | | Roque Sapiri | | | Total Apps & Gls | | | |
| Nat | Nick | Name | A | P | 2011 | 2012 | 2013 | 2014 | 2015 | 2016 | 2017 (3rd) | | | 2018 (7th) | | | 2018–19 (6th) | | | 2019–20 | | | Total Apps & Gls | | | |
| Nat | Nick | Name | A | P | 7 | 11 | 5 | 8 | 10 | 9 | ^{#} | ^{A} | ^{G} | ^{#} | ^{A} | ^{G} | ^{#} | ^{A} | ^{G} | ^{#} | ^{A} | ^{G} | ^{S} | ^{A} | ^{G} | |
|---|---|---|---|---|---|---|---|---|---|---|---|---|---|---|---|---|---|---|---|---|---|---|---|---|---|---|
| (Angola) | Abdul | António Nzayinawo | 24 | DF | | | | | | | → | | | – | | | | | | | | | | | | |
| (Angola) | Abegá Pacavira | Manuel Pedro Pacavira | 28 | MF | 2011 | 28 | 8 | – | → | | | | | | | | | | | | | | | | | |
| (Angola) | Adó Pena | António Joaquim Barros Pena | 24 | MF | | | | | | | 29 | ^{7(3)} | ^{1} | 29 | ^{14(3)} | ^{3} | 29 | ^{9(4)} | ^{1} | 27 | ^{1} | ^{0} | | | | |
| (Democratic Republic of the Congo) | Afó | Munati Balibua Afo | | GK | 2011 | 23 | | | | | | | | | | | | | | | | | | | | |
| (Angola) | Água Doce | José Fernandes Mbuta | 26 | MF | | | | | | | | | | | | | → | | | 26 | ^{20(2)} | ^{1} | | | | |
| (Angola) | Albano | Albano Eduardo Vieira | | DF | 2011 | 27 | 27 | 27 | 27 | | | | | | | | | | | | | | | | | |
| (Angola) | Alexandre Fernando | Alexandre Abel Fernando | 22 | DF | | | | | | | | | | | | | 11 | ^{2} | ^{0} | – | ^{1} | ^{0} | | | | → |
| (Angola) | Almeida Fernando | José Xavier Fernando | 27 | MF | | | | | | | → | | | 6 | ^{15} | ^{0} | 8 | ^{22(1)} | ^{0} | 8 | ^{6(1)} | ^{0} | | | | → |
| (Angola) | Anastácio Costa | Anastácio Manuel da Costa | 31 | DF | | | | | 30 | | | | | | | | | | | | | | | | | |
| (Angola) | Aníbal Sataria | Aníbal Joaquim Sataria | 22 | FW | | | | | | | | | | | | | 14 | ^{4(1)} | ^{1} | 14 | ^{1(3)} | ^{0} | | | | |
| (Democratic Republic of the Congo) | Apataki | Patrick Kifu Apataki | 29 | | | | | | 18 | | | | | | | | | | | | | | | | | |
| (Angola) | Ary Calvete | Helmut Ariadne Figueiredo Calvete | 27 | MF | | | | 14 | 14 | 14 | | | | | | | | | | | | | | | | |
| (Angola) | Ayala | Mário Álvaro Agostinho | 29 | MF | | | | | → | 5 | 5 | ^{DNP} | | | | | | | | | | | | | | |
| (Angola) | Bebé | Nivaldo B.S. Alves do Nascimento | 26 | | | | | | | → | 26 | ⋅ | ⋅ | → | | | | | | | | | | | | |
| (Senegal) | Ben Traoré | Naman Traoré | 30 | FW | | | | | | | → | | | 16 | ^{18(2)} | ^{7} | 16 | ^{8(8)} | ^{2} | → | | | | | | |
| (Angola) | Beni | Beni Kimbi Fua | – | MF | | | | | | 19 | 19 | ^{19(1)} | ^{1} | 19 | ^{10(3)} | ^{0} | 19 | ^{4(1)} | ^{0} | → | | | ↑ | | | |
| (Angola) | Beto | | | MF | 2011 | | | | | | | | | | | | | | | | | | | | | |
| (Angola) | Bombasa | Bombasa Victor | | GK | | 12 | 12 | 1 | → | | | | | | | | | | | | | | | | | |
| (Angola) | Bruno | | | | | | – | | | | | | | | | | | | | | | | | | | |
| (Angola) | Bugos | Roandro Ivan da Fonseca Semedo | 27 | MF | | | → | 29 | 11 | 11 | 11 | ^{12} | ^{6} | → | | | | | | | | | | | | |
| (Angola) | Cabibi Ramos | Leonardo Manuel Isola Ramos | 28 | MF | | | | | | | | | | | | | → | | | 22 | ^{3(5)} | ^{0} | | | | → |
| (Angola) | Cachi | Januário da Cruz Sesa | 29 | MF | | | – | | | → | 21 | ^{21(1)} | ^{3} | 21 | ^{22(2)} | ^{6} | 21 | ^{28} | ^{3} | 21 | ^{19(2)} | ^{4} | | | | |
| (Angola) | Capita | Evanildo de Jesus Pedro | 27 | FW | | | | | → | 17 | 17 | ^{1(8)} | ^{0} | → | | | | | | | | | | | | |
| (Angola) | Capuco | Emanuel José Paulo João | 30 | DF | | | | → | 15 | 15 | → | | | | | | | | | | | | | | | |
| (Angola) | Carlitos Victor | João Pedro Victor | 26 | GK | | | | | | 12 | 12 | ^{1} | ^{0} | 12 | ^{8} | ^{0} | 1 | ^{DNP} | | | | | | | | |
| (Angola) | Carlos Camolongi | Carlos Camolongi | 30 | GK | | | | | | 23 | 1 | ^{8} | ^{0} | 1 | ^{7} | ^{0} | → | | | | | | | | | |
| (Democratic Republic of the Congo) | Carlos Fuila | Carlos Nzuzi Fuila | 28 | MF | 2011 | 6 | 6 | 6 | 6 | → | | | | | | | | | | | | | | | | |
| (Angola) | Castigo | Eduardo de Andrade Cancelinha | 28 | MF | 2011 | → | | | | | | | | | | | | | | | | | | | | |
| (Angola) | Chico Bunga | Carlos Francisco Diassonama Panzo Bunga | – | MF | | | | | | | | | | | | | → | | | 11 | ^{9(13)} | ^{4} | ↑ | | | |
| (Angola) | Cláudio | | | | 2011 | | | | | | | | | | | | | | | | | | | | | |
| (Democratic Republic of the Congo) | Daddy | Etekiama Agiti Tady | 34 | FW | | | | | | | | | | | | | → | | | 28 | ^{6(6)} | ^{2} | | | | |
| (Democratic Republic of the Congo) | Daniel, Kiala | Kiala Daniel | | FW | | | | – | | | | | | | | | | | | | | | | | | |
| (Angola) | Dany Traça | Danilson do Carmo Josefino Traça | 31 | MF | | | | | | → | 7 | ^{5} | ^{0} | 7 | ^{8(3)} | ^{0} | | | | | | | | | | |
| (Angola) | Dasfaa | Garcia Salvador Vieira | | MF | → | 31 | 31 | | | | | | | | | | | | | | | | | | | |
| (Angola) | Denilson Catemba | Adolfo da Silva Catemba | 25 | DF | 2011 | | 19 | 19 | 19 | 19 | | | | | | | | | | | | | | | | |
| (Cape Verde) | Denis Morais | Denis Cunha Morais | 28 | DF | | | | | | 4 | | | | 4 | ^{13(1)} | ^{0} | 4 | ^{3(1)} | ^{0} | | | | | | | |
| (Angola) | Depaiza | Estevão Manuel Quitocota Cahoco | 25 | DF | | | → | 21 | 21 | 21 | → | | | | | | | | | | | | | | | |
| (Angola) | Didí | | | | | | | | | – | | | | | | | | | | | | | | | | |
| (Angola) | Djamini | Francisco Domingos João | 28 | MF | | | | | | → | 14 | ^{2(2)} | ^{1} | 10 | ^{2(4)} | ^{0} | → | | | | | | | | | |
| (Angola) | Djibril | Miguel Ngoi | | | 2011 | | | | | | | | | | | | | | | | | | | | | |
| (Cameroon) | Edgard | Edgard Arnaud Afane | 19 | MF | 2011 | → | | | | | | | | | | | | | | | | | | | | |
| (Angola) | Edson Silva | Edson Jesus Silva | 27 | DF | | | | | | → | 2 | ^{11(3)} | ^{1} | 2 | ^{14} | ^{1} | 2 | ^{7} | ^{0} | | | | | | | |
| (Angola) | Eliseu Calei | Eliseu Manuel Calei | 24 | DF | | | | | | | | | | | | | 2 | ^{1(1)} | ^{13} | 2 | ^{10} | ^{0} | | | | |
| (Democratic Republic of the Congo) | Erancia | Mbuata Maneka Erancia | | MF | | 4 | 4 | | | | | | | | | | | | | | | | | | | |
| (Cameroon) | Esmael | | | | | | | | | | 5 | ^{1} | ^{0} | | | | | | | | | | | | | |
| (Angola) | Estória | Sérgio António Luís | 30 | DF | | | | | | | | | | → | | | 24 | ^{11(1)} | ^{0} | 24 | ^{2(1)} | ^{0} | | | | |
| (Angola) | Fatite † | Paulo Alcides Raul Camufingo | 32 | MF | 2011 | 3 | 3 | 3 | 3 | 3 | → | | | | | | | | | | | | | | | |
| (Angola) | Feião | Moisés Sebastião Cabungula | 27 | MF | | | | | | | 16 | ^{2(6)} | ^{2} | 11 | ^{3(1)} | ^{0} | → | | | | | | | | | |
| (Nigeria) | Femi | Joseph Femi Olatubosun | – | MF | | | | | | → | 15 | ^{17(4)} | ^{6} | 15 | ^{27} | ^{2} | 15 | ^{24(2)} | ^{1} | 15 | ^{24(2)} | ^{5} | ↑ | | | |
| (Angola) | Filipe Silva | Israel Kipindi Pacote da Silva | 33 | FW | | | | | | → | 23 | ^{6(4)} | ^{1} | 23 | ^{(7)} | ^{1} | 23 | ^{1(6)} | ^{1} | → | | | | | | |
| (Angola) | Francis | Francisco Marta Agostinho da Rosa | 27 | MF | | | | | | → | 10 | ^{5(8)} | ^{1} | → | | | 10 | ^{3(12)} | ^{0} | 10 | ^{6(6)} | ^{0} | | | | → |
| (Brazil) | Gabriel | Gabriel Santos | 23 | MF | | | | | 8 | | | | | | | | | | | | | | | | | |
| (Angola) | Gaspar Kialonda | Kialonda Gaspar | – | DF | | | | | | | | | | | | | 6 | ^{20} | ^{0} | 6 | ^{18(1)} | ^{2} | ↑ | | | |
| (Democratic Republic of the Congo) | Gigí | Jaures Maudsly Ngombe | 20 | FW | | | | | | | | | | 14 | ^{1(5)} | ^{1} | | | | | | | | | | |
| (Angola) | Gildo | Hermenegildo Pedro João | 29 | DF | 2011 | 18 | | | | | | | | | | | | | | | | | | | | |
| (Angola) | Godzilla | | | DF | | | | | 24 | | | | | | | | | | | | | | | | | |
| (Angola) | Gomito Cassule | António Gonçalo Cassule | 33 | MF | | | | | → | 30 | → | | | | | | | | | | | | | | | |
| (Angola) | Guedes | Guedes Inês Castro Júlio Lupapa | 32 | MF | 2011 | 21 | 9 | 9 | 9 | 9 | 9 | ^{12(3)} | ^{1} | 9 | ^{6(8)} | ^{1} | 9 | ^{6(9)} | ^{2} | 9 | ^{5(5)} | ^{0} | | | | |
| (Angola) | Hernâni | Hernâni das Neves Tomás | 37 | DF | | | | | 2 | 2 | | | | | | | | | | | | | | | | |
| (Angola) | Higino Julião | Ezequiel Paulo Julião | 26 | FW | | | | | | | → | | | 3 | ^{11(10)} | ^{1} | 3 | ^{22(3)} | ^{0} | 3 | ^{15(3)} | ^{0} | | | | → |
| (Angola) | Isaías Agostinho | Isaías José Agostinho | 23 | MF | | | | | → | 8 | → | | | | | | | | | | | | | | | |
| (Poland) | Jacek | Jacek Magdziński | 31 | FW | | | | | | → | 16 | ^{3(4)} | ^{2} | | | | | | | | | | | | | |
| (Angola) | Jamuana | Manuel Alexandre Jamuana | 32 | DF | → | 17 | | | | | | | | | | | | | | | | | | | | |
| (Brazil) | Jeferson | Jeferson Miguel da Silva | 31 | DF | | | | | | → | 3 | ^{20} | ^{1} | → | | | | | | | | | | | | |
| (Democratic Republic of the Congo) | Jiresse | Mawiya Tutona Jiresse | 28 | FW | | | | | | | | | | → | | | 18 | ^{23(3)} | ^{11} | 18 | ^{13(5)} | ^{2} | | | | → |
| (Angola) | Jó Júnior | Marcos Pedro Júnior | – | DF | | | | | | | | | | | | | 5 | ^{12(4)} | ^{0} | 5 | ^{5(5)} | ^{0} | ↑ | | | |
| (Brazil) | Joaelton | Joaelton Jonathan Sampaio | 27 | FW | | | | | – | | | | | | | | | | | | | | | | | |
| (Angola) | João Vala | João José Delgado Vala | 28 | DF | | | 21 | | | | | | | | | | | | | | | | | | | |
| (Angola) | Joãozinho | | | | | | – | | | | | | | | | | | | | | | | | | | |
| (Angola) | Joca Palana | Osvaldo Jacob Chitumba Palana | 28 | FW | | | | | → | 20 | 20 | ^{11(7)} | ^{5} | → | | | | | | | | | | | | |
| (Democratic Republic of the Congo) | Johnny | Matumona Mbemba Johnny | 34 | GK | | | | | 1 | 1 | | | | | | | | | | | | | | | | |
| (Angola) | Jotabé | João Baptista Missenga do Nascimento | – | GK | | | | | | | → | | | 13 | ^{13} | ^{0} | 13 | ^{24} | ^{0} | 13 | ^{5} | ^{0} | ↑ | | | |
| (Angola) | Júnior | | | DF | 2011 | 16 | | | 7 | | | | | | | | | | | | | | | | | |
| (Democratic Republic of the Congo) | Kalobo | Ghislain Mukendi Kalobo | 28 | | | | 24 | – | | | | | | | | | | | | | | | | | | |
| (Angola) | Lami Zinga | Guilherme Zinga | 29 | GK | | | – | – | → | | | | | | | | | | | | | | | | | |
| (Angola) | Langanga | Landu Langanga | – | GK | | | | | | | | | | | | | → | | | 12 | ^{21} | ^{0} | ↑ | | | |
| (Angola) | Larrama | Larrama Muzia Migi Rodrigues | 21 | FW | | | | | 29 | 29 | | | | | | | | | | | | | | | | |
| (Angola) | Lau | | | | 2011 | | | | | | | | | | | | | | | | | | | | | |
| (Angola) | Lelas | Adérito Yandelela Chissoca | 28 | FW | | | → | 16 | 16 | 16 | 27 | ^{1(6)} | ^{1} | → | | | | | | | | | | | | |
| (Angola) | Leonardo Mulunda | Leonardo A. Mulunda | 23 | GK | | | | | | | | | | | | | 12 | ^{1} | ^{0} | → | | | | | | |
| (Angola) | Lépua | Simone Eduardo Assa Miranda | – | FW | | | | | | | → | | | 22 | ^{7(5)} | ^{0} | 31 | ^{4(4)} | ^{1} | 16 | ^{10(5)} | ^{5} | ↑ | | | |
| (Democratic Republic of the Congo) | Lokwa | Lokwa Mbo Blanchard | 27 | GK | | | → | 12 | 12 | → | | | | | | | | | | | | | | | | |
| (Angola) | Lourenço Adriano | Lourenço Cambiombo Sapalo Adriano | 27 | MF | | | | | | | | | | → | | | 26 | ^{5} | ^{0} | → | | | | | | |
| (Angola) | Love Cabungula | Arsénio Sebastião Cabungula | 37 | FW | | | | | 18 | 7 | → | | | | | | | | | | | | | | | |
| (Angola) | Lucas | | | DF | | | | – | | | | | | | | | | | | | | | | | | |
| (Brazil) | Luciano Câmara | Luciano Carlos Marques Câmara | 26 | FW | | → | 11 | 11 | → | | | | | | | | | | | | | | | | | |
| (Angola) | Luís Tati | Luís Bumba Tati | – | DF | | | | | | | → | | | 20 | ^{14(3)} | ^{1} | 20 | ^{25(1)} | ^{2} | 20 | ^{23} | ^{0} | ↑ | | | |
| (Angola) | Lulas | Manuel Ngalula Sallo Cunha | – | DF | | | | 25 | 25 | 25 | 25 | ^{3(1)} | ^{0} | 25 | ^{19(1)} | ^{0} | 25 | ^{18} | ^{0} | 25 | ^{19(4)} | ^{2} | ↑ | | | |
| (Angola) | Maló | Bernardo Malongo José | | MF | | | → | – | – | | | | | | | | | | | | | | | | | |
| (Angola) | Marcelo | | | DF | | | | – | | | | | | | | | | | | | | | | | | |
| (Angola) | Márcio Luvambo | Márcio Armando Gonçalves Luvambo | 29 | FW | | | | | – | | | | | | | | | | | | | | | | | |
| (Angola) | Mariano Luvunga | Mariano Ribeiro Luvunga | 26 | MF | 2011 | 32 | 7 | 7 | → | | | | | | | | | | | | | | | | | |
| (Angola) | Matengó | Mateus Gaspar Domingos | – | MF | | | | | | | | | | | | | | | | 27 | ^{2(4)} | ^{0} | ↑ | | | |
| (Portugal) | Mauro Almeida | Mauro Alexandre de Silva Almeida | 32 | DF | | → | 18 | 2 | → | | | | | | | | | | | | | | | | | |
| (Angola) | Mendinho Tavares | Walter Moura Mendes Tavares | 26 | MF | | → | 23 | 23 | 10 | → | | | | | | | | | | | | | | | | |
| (Angola) | Mingo Sanda | Domingos Fernando Sanda | 31 | DF | 2011 | 5 | 5 | → | | | | | | | | | | | | | | | | | | |
| (Angola) | Miranda | José Miranda Cuamba da Silva | 19 | MF | | | | | | 27 | | | | | | | | | | | | | | | | |
| (Angola) | Muenho | Gervásio Domingos Calela | – | DF | | | | | | | → | | | 17 | ^{7(1)} | ^{0} | 17 | ^{17} | ^{0} | 17 | ^{17} | ^{0} | ↑ | | | |
| (Democratic Republic of the Congo) | Mufuku | Mufuku Babi | 25 | | | 26 | 26 | – | → | | | | | | | | | | | | | | | | | |
| (Nigeria) | Musa | Musa Tachi Najare | 28 | FW | | | | | | | → | | | 26 | ^{6(6)} | ^{3} | 7 | ^{12(3)} | ^{2} | 7 | ^{3} | ^{1} | | | | |
| (Angola) | Nandinho Bongue | Fernando Bongue | | DF | 2011 | 8 | | – | | | | | | | | | | | | | | | | | | |
| (Angola) | Nandinho II | | | | 2011 | | | | | | | | | | | | | | | | | | | | | |
| (Angola) | Natael | Natael Paulo Masuekama | 21 | DF | | 30 | 28 | 28 | → | | | | | | | | | | | | | | | | | |
| (Angola) | Ndieu | Ndieu Doune António Massadila | 29 | DF | | | | | | | → | | | 27 | ^{6(2)} | ^{1} | | | | → | | | | | | |
| (Angola) | Nuno Rodrigues | Nuno Filipe Martins Rodrigues | 35 | DF | | | → | 17 | | | | | | | | | | | | | | | | | | |
| (Portugal) | Oliveira, António | António Manuel da Silva Oliveira | 32 | MF | | | | | 24 | 10 | → | | | | | | | | | | | | | | | |
| (Democratic Republic of the Congo) | Owe | Bonyanga Ituku Owe | | FW | | | | | | | → | | | 14 | ^{2(2)} | ^{0} | | | | | | | | | | |
| (Angola) | Paizo | | | DF | | | | – | | | | | | | | | | | | | | | | | | |
| (Angola) | Panilson | Feliciano Felisberto Javela | 29 | DF | | | | | | → | 24 | ^{23} | ^{0} | 24 | ^{20(1)} | ^{0} | → | | | | | | | | | |
| (Angola) | Papi | Isaac Maioca Caracato | 28 | DF | | | | | 5 | | | | | | | | | | | | | | | | | |
| (Democratic Republic of the Congo) | Patrick Anfumu | Patrick Lembo Anfumu | 28 | FW | | → | 30 | 30 | → | | | | | | | | | | | | | | | | | |
| (Angola) | Patrick Moniz | Tadi Nsuadi Moniz | | DF | | 13 | 13 | 13 | 13 | 16 | 30 | ^{13(2)} | ^{0} | 30 | ^{7} | ^{0} | → | | | | | | | | | |
| (Angola) | Paulito Fuxe | Paulo Quental Fuxe | 33 | DF | 2011 | 19 | | | | | | | | | | | | | | | | | | | | |
| (Angola) | Palucho | Paulo Pereira da Silva | 23 | DF | → | 14 | 14 | | | | | | | | | | | | | | | | | | | |
| (Angola) | Pedro Miguel | Miguel Bengi Pedro | 20 | FW | | | | | | 27 | | | | | | | | | | | | | | | | |
| (Angola) | Pilolas | José Olívio Andrade Pereira | 30 | FW | | | | | 17 | → | | | | | | | | | | | | | | | | |
| (Angola) | Pingo | Mateus João Francisco Bravo | 33 | DF | | | | | ⋅ | ⋅ | 28 | ^{9(1)} | ^{0} | 28 | ^{8} | ^{0} | | | | | | | | | | |
| (Angola) | Poco | Manuel Paulo Víctor | 29 | DF | | | | | | | | | | → | | | 22 | ^{4(2)} | ^{0} | | | | | | | |
| (Democratic Republic of the Congo) | Riddy | Ruddy Michel Etienne Liema Ebengo | 27 | FW | 2011 | 9 | | | | | | | | | | | | | | | | | | | | |
| (Angola) | Rolli | Alentua Tangala Rolli | 23 | DF | | | | 18 | | 18 | | | | | | | | | | | | | | | | |
| (Angola) | Russo | António Cordeiro Vunge | | | | → | 16 | | | | | | | | | | | | | | | | | | | |
| (Democratic Republic of the Congo) | Saki Amisi | Saki Ndaka Amisi | | DF | 2011 | 15 | 15 | | | | | | | | | | | | | | | | | | | |
| (Ivory Coast) | Saki Michel | Andre Michel Saki Sakmo | 27 | MF | | 20 | | | | | | | | | | | | | | | | | | | | |
| (Angola) | Samuel, Zinga | Zinga Samuel | | DF | | | → | – | | | | | | | | | | | | | | | | | | |
| (Ivory Coast) | Savané | Savane Aly Touré | – | MF | 2011 | 10 | 10 | 10 | → | | | | | | | | | | | | | | ↑ | | | |
| (Angola) | Sena | Sebastião João Barreto Gomes | 35 | GK | 2011 | | | | | | | | | | | | | | | | | | | | | |
| (Ghana) | Seth | Seth Owusu | 26 | DF | | | | | 26 | 26 | | | | | | | | | | | | | | | | |
| (Angola) | Simão Veya | Rosalino Baleiro Veya | – | DF | | | | | | | | | | | | | → | | | 4 | ^{21} | ^{2} | ↑ | | | |
| (Angola) | Sucami | João Sucami Nzongo | | GK | | 1 | 1 | | | | | | | | | | | | | | | | | | | |
| (Angola) | Tití | Luís Vicente Arão | 31 | GK | | | | | | | | | | | | | 1 | ^{5} | ^{0} | 1 | ^{DNP} | | | | | → |
| (Brazil) | Tom Custódio | Angstrom Carlos Custódio | 23 | DF | | | | | | | 8 | ^{12} | ^{0} | 8 | ^{19} | ^{0} | | | | | | | | | | |
| (Angola) | Tresor Sousa | Tresor Stanislau de Sousa | 24 | MF | | – | | | | 6 | 6 | ^{20} | ^{1} | → | | | | | | | | | | | | |
| (Angola) | Vado | | | FW | 2011 | – | | | | | | | | | | | | | | | | | | | | |
| (Angola) | Victoriano Bucumba | Victoriano Naueji Lucoquessa Bucumba | 26 | MF | | | | | | 24 | | | | | | | 30 | ^{5(3)} | ^{0} | → | | | | | | |
| (Angola) | Vilar | Modesto Luís Feliciano Vilar | 30 | DF | 2011 | | | | | | | | | | | | | | | | | | | | | |
| (Angola) | Yuri Lutonda | Roberto Yuri Lutonda | 26 | MF | | | | | | | → | | | 18 | ^{1(2)} | ^{0} | → | | | 23 | ^{1} | ^{0} | | | | |
| (Angola) | Yuri Tavares | Yuri José Chissende Tavares | 28 | GK | | 22 | | 22 | 22 | 22 | 22 | ^{15} | ^{0} | | | | | | | | | | | | | |
| (Democratic Republic of the Congo) | Zamba | Zamba Victor Ngolu | | GK | 2011 | | | | | | | | | | | | | | | | | | | | | |
| (Angola) | Zé Augusto | José Augusto de Oliveira Gomes | 32 | MF | | | | → | 28 | 28 | | | | | | | | | | | | | | | | |
| (Democratic Republic of the Congo) | Zibakaka † | Ntuntu Zibakaka | 23 | DF | | | | | 13 | 13 | | | | | | | | | | | | | | | | |
| (Angola) | Zinho Francisco | Adilson Francisco | | | | | 17 | | | | | | | | | | | | | | | | | | | |
| Years | | | | | 2011 | 2012 | 2013 | 2014 | 2015 | 2016 | 2017 | | | 2018 | | | 2018–19 | | 27 | 2019–20 | | 30 | | | | |

== 2001–2010 ==
G.D. Sagrada Esperança players 2001–2010

| Nat | Nick | Name | A | P | – | – | Mário Calado | | | F.M. | F.M. | J.B. | N.B. | F.M. | |
| Nat | Nick | Name | A | P | 2001 | 2002 | 2003 | 2004 | 2005 | 2006 | 2007 | 2008 | 2009 | 2010 | |
| Nat | Nick | Name | A | P | 6 | 9 | 11 | 2 | 1 | 6 | 4 | 12 | 1 | 11 | |
|---|---|---|---|---|---|---|---|---|---|---|---|---|---|---|---|
| (Angola) | Albano Vieira | Albano Eduardo Vieira | – | DF | | | | | | | | 2008 | | 2010 | ↑ |
| (Angola) | Alex Mateus | Alex Eganda Mateus | | DF | | | 2003 | | 2005 | 2006 | | | | | |
| (Angola) | Andia | Andia Molulu Richard | | | | | 2003 | 2004 | 2005 | 2006 | | | | | |
| (Angola) | António | | | | | | | | 2005 | | | | | | |
| (Angola) | Bebeto Vieira | Abel Miguel Vieira | 27 | FW | | | | | | → | 2007 | 2008 | → | | |
| (Angola) | Beck | | | MF | | | 2003 | | | | | | | | |
| (Angola) | Beto Monteiro | Alberto Joaquim Monteiro | | FW | | | 2003 | 2004 | | 2006 | 2007 | 2008 | 2009 | 2010 | |
| (Angola) | Bondoso | | | MF | | → | 2003 | 2004 | 2005 | | | | | | |
| (Angola) | Buba | | | | | | | | | | | | | 2010 | |
| (Democratic Republic of the Congo) | Cadet | Cadet Matempo Dikima | | | | | | | 2005 | 2006 | | | | | |
| (Angola) | Carioca | António Ernesto Nangola | | | | | 2003 | | | | | | | | |
| (Angola) | Carlos Oliveira | Victor Emanuel de Oliveira | 28 | DF | | | | | | | | → | 2009 | 2010 | |
| (Angola) | Chilonga | Gabriel Tetela Chilonga | | FW | | | | | | | | 2008 | | | |
| (Angola) | Chinguila | João Lourenço Cardoso de Carvalho | | DF | | | | | | 2006 | 2007 | | | 2010 | |
| (Angola) | Chinho | João dos Santos de Almeida | 23 | MF | | | 2003 | 2004 | 2005 | | | | | | |
| (Angola) | Dias Caires | Yahenda Joaquim Caires Fernandes | 31 | DF | | | | | | | | 2008 | 2009 | → | |
| (Namibia) | Djo | Johannes Gabriel Dumisa Jantze | 27 | MF | | | | | | | 2007 | 2008 | 2009 | 2010 | |
| (Angola) | Dudú | | | | | 2002 | 2003 | | | | | | | | |
| (Cameroon) | Edgard | Edgard Arnaud Afane | – | MF | | | | | | | | | | 2010 | ↑ |
| (Angola) | Fabrício | | | DF | | | | | | | | 2008 | | | |
| (Angola) | Fatite | Paulo Alcides Raul Camufingo | – | MF | | | 2003 | 2004 | 2005 | 2006 | 2007 | 2008 | 2009 | 2010 | ↑ |
| (Angola) | Fefé | Alfredo José da Fonseca Sobral | | | | | | | | 2006 | 2007 | | | | |
| (Angola) | Feliciano Kilange | Feliciano Mbaki Kilange | | DF | | | | | | | | | → | 2010 | |
| (Angola) | Filipe | | | | | | | | 2005 | | | | | | |
| (Angola) | Fita | Fernando Fita António Francisco | | FW | | | | | | | | → | 2009 | 2010 | → |
| (Angola) | Frank Moniz | Francisco Moniz Hungo | 35 | DF | | | 2003 | | | | | | | | |
| (Angola) | Goliath | Matumona Lundala | 33 | GK | | | → | 2004 | 2005 | 2006 | → | | | | |
| (Angola) | Hélder Vicente | Hélder de Jesus Serafim Vicente | 30 | DF | | | → | 2004 | 2005 | → | | | | | |
| (Angola) | Hidrox | | | | | | | | | | | 2008 | | | |
| (Angola) | Isaac Lokuli | Boelua Lokuli | 27 | FW | | | | 2004 | | | | | | | |
| (Angola) | Joãozinho | | | DF | | | 2003 | | | | | | | | |
| (Angola) | Jojó Mendes | Humberto Jorge Graça Mendes | 38 | MF | | | 2003 | 2004 | 2005 | 2006 | 2007 | 2008 | → | | |
| (Angola) | John | | | | | | | 2004 | | | | | | | |
| (Angola) | Jona | | | | | 2002 | | | | | | | | | |
| (Angola) | Joni | | | | | | 2003 | 2004 | | | | | | | |
| (Angola) | Jorginho Lopes | Jorge Fernando Cabral Lopes | 30 | MF | | | 2003 | | | | | | | | |
| (Angola) | Júnior | | – | FW | | | | | | | | | | 2010 | ↑ |
| (Angola) | Kivota | Rui Manuel Kivota Cata | 28 | GK | | | 2003 | 2004 | 2005 | → | | | | | |
| (Angola) | Lebo Lebo | António Lebo Lebo | 28 | DF | | | 2003 | 2004 | 2005 | | | | | | |
| (Angola) | Lito | | | MF | | | 2003 | | | | | | | | |
| (Democratic Republic of the Congo) | Lofó | Serge Lofo Bongeli | 27 | FW | | | | | | → | 2007 | | | | |
| (Angola) | Loló Cassule | Jorge Miguel Gonçalves Cassule | | MF | | | | | | | | | 2009 | 2010 | → |
| (Angola) | Lucas Huango | Lucas Huango | 25 | MF | | | | | | | | | | 2010 | |
| (Angola) | Maninho Loide | Loide Manuel Mendes | | MF | | | → | 2004 | 2005 | 2006 | | | | | |
| (Angola) | Maninho Matias | António Pascoal Matias | 28 | DF | | | | | | 2006 | | | | | |
| (Angola) | Manuel Sala | Manuel Arlindo Sala | 25 | DF | | | | | | | 2007 | → | | | |
| (Angola) | Marcos Bumba | Marcos Luís Bumba | | MF | | | | 2004 | 2005 | | | 2008 | | | |
| (Angola) | Mariano Luvunga | Mariano Ribeiro Luvunga | – | MF | | | | | | | 2007 | 2008 | | 2010 | ↑ |
| (Angola) | Mayala | Alberto Mayala Kimedica | 18 | GK | | | | | | | | 2008 | | | |
| (Democratic Republic of the Congo) | Mbala | Lakuya Mbala | 28 | | | | | 2004 | 2005 | 2006 | | | | | |
| (Angola) | Mbunga | | | | | 2002 | | | | | | | | | |
| (Angola) | Moisés Almeida | Moisés Augusto de Almeida | | DF | | | | 2004 | 2005 | 2006 | | | | | |
| (Angola) | Moreno, Rúben | Rúben Paulo Moreno | 24 | DF | | | | | | | | 2008 | | | |
| (Angola) | Nando Caquinta | Fernando Lourenço da Silva Caquinta | 31 | DF | | | | | | → | 2007 | 2008 | → | | |
| (Angola) | Ndó | António Nenuele Nelo | 22 | MF | | | | | | 2006 | 2007 | 2008 | → | | |
| (Angola) | Nelito | | | FW | | | | | | | | | 2009 | 2010 | |
| (Angola) | Neruda | Stélvio de Assis Vieira de Olim | | MF | | | | | | | → | 2008 | → | | |
| (Democratic Republic of the Congo) | Nsingui | Bruno Mpambu Nsingui | 29 | MF | | | | | | | | 2008 | 2009 | 2010 | |
| (Angola) | Nsuka Sapato | Domingos Celestino Sapato | | DF | | | | 2004 | 2005 | → | | | | | |
| (Democratic Republic of the Congo) | Ntumba | Ntumba Firmino Ngalamulume | | GK | | | | | | → | 2007 | 2008 | → | | |
| (Angola) | Nzinga, André | André Nzinga | 26 | FW | | | | | | | → | 2008 | | | |
| (Angola) | Paíto Fernandes | Manuel Gaspar Fernandes | 26 | MF | | | | | | | → | 2008 | 2009 | 2010 | |
| (Angola) | Palucho Garrine | Paulo Alberto Garrine | | DF | | | 2003 | 2004 | 2005 | 2006 | 2007 | 2008 | 2009 | 2010 | |
| (Angola) | Pitchú Landu | Tubi Landu | 23 | GK | | | 2003 | → | | | | | | | |
| (Angola) | Roque | Roque André Sapiri | 33 | DF | | | 2003 | 2004 | 2005 | | 2007 | | | | |
| (Ivory Coast) | Saki | André Saki Michael Sakmo | – | FW | | | | | | | 2007 | 2008 | 2009 | 2010 | ↑ |
| (Angola) | Santana Carlos | José da Silva Santana Carlos | 20 | FW | | | 2003 | 2004 | 2005 | → | | | | | |
| (Ivory Coast) | Savané | Savane Aly | – | MF | | | | | | | 2007 | 2008 | 2009 | 2010 | ↑ |
| (Angola) | Sena | Sebastião João Barreto Gomes | | GK | | | | | | 2006 | 2007 | 2008 | | | |
| (Angola) | Sotto † | António Virgílio Sotto-Mayo | 28 | MF | | | | | → | 2006 | 2007 | 2008 | 2009 | → | |
| (Angola) | Stopirrá | Edgar Jerónimo | 30 | MF | | | | | → | 2006 | 2007 | 2008 | | | |
| (Angola) | Tetas | | | | | | | | | | 2007 | | | | |
| (Angola) | Tony Osódio | António Osódio Pascoal Chilembo | 31 | | | | | | → | 2006 | → | | | | |
| (Angola) | Vado | | – | FW | | | | | | | 2007 | | | 2010 | ↑ |
| (Angola) | Vilar | Modesto Luís Feliciano Vilar | – | DF | | | | | | | 2007 | 2008 | 2009 | 2010 | ↑ |
| (Democratic Republic of the Congo) | Yemweni | Jean-Jacques Ngidi Yemweni | 30 | FW | | | | | → | 2006 | → | | | | |
| (Angola) | Yuri Tavares | Yuri José Chissende Tavares | – | GK | | | | | | | | | | 2010 | ↑ |
| (Democratic Republic of the Congo) | Zamba Ngolu | Zamba Victor Ngolu | – | GK | | | | | | | | → | 2009 | 2010 | ↑ |
| Years | | | | | 2001 | 2002 | 2003 | 2004 | 2005 | 2006 | 2007 | 2008 | 2009 | 2010 | |

== 1991–2000 ==
G.D. Sagrada Esperança players 1991–2000

| Nat | Nick | Name | A | P | J. Machado | | | | | | J.M. | JLB | J. Machado | |
| Nat | Nick | Name | A | P | 1991 | 1992 | 1993 | 1994 | 1995 | 1996 | 1997 | 1998 | 1999 | 2000 |
| Nat | Nick | Name | A | P | – | – | – | – | – | – | – | – | – | – |
|---|---|---|---|---|---|---|---|---|---|---|---|---|---|---|
| (Angola) | Aguinaldo | | | | | 1992 | 1993 | | | | | | | |
| (Angola) | Ary | | | | | | 1993 | | | | | | | |
| (Angola) | Babá | | | | | 1992 | | | | | | | | |
| (Angola) | Beirão | | | | | 1992 | 1993 | | | | | | | |
| (Angola) | Beto | | | | | 1992 | | | | | | | | |
| (Angola) | Bondoso | | – | MF | | | | | | | | | 1999 | 2000 |
| (Angola) | Bukaka † | | | MF | | 1992 | | | | | | | | |
| (Angola) | Cangato | | | | | | 1993 | | | | | | | |
| (Angola) | Chalana | | | | | | | | | | | | 1999 | 2000 |
| (Angola) | Chibuabua | | | | | | 1993 | | | | | | | |
| (Angola) | Chicangala | André Chicangala | 16 | FW | | 1992 | → | | | | | | | |
| (Angola) | Cláudio | | | | | | | | | | | 1998 | | |
| (Angola) | Cubano | | | | | | | | | | | | 1999 | 2000 |
| (Angola) | Dário | | | | | | 1993 | | | | | | | |
| (Angola) | Devigor | Valdo Euclides da Costa | 21 | FW | | | | | | | 1997 | 1998 | | |
| (Angola) | Dindinho | | | | | 1992 | 1993 | | | | | | | |
| (Angola) | Dinis | | | | | | | | | | | | 1999 | |
| (Angola) | Dito | | | | | | 1993 | | | | | | | |
| (Angola) | Djalma | | | | | | | | | | | 1998 | | |
| (Angola) | Dumba | | | | | | 1993 | | | | | | | |
| (Angola) | Esquerdinho Kuatula † | Duarte Adriano Kuatula | | | | 1992 | | | | | | | | |
| (Angola) | Ferreira Pinto | | | | | 1992 | | | | | | | | |
| (Angola) | Filipe | | | | | | | | | | 1997 | | | |
| (Angola) | Frank | Francisco Moniz Hungo | – | DF | | | | | | | 1997 | 1998 | 1999 | 2000 |
| (Angola) | Gema | | | | | 1992 | 1993 | | | | | | | |
| (Angola) | Gito | | | | | | | | | | | 1998 | | |
| (Angola) | Gouveia | | | | | | | | | | 1997 | | | |
| (Angola) | Jaburú | Carlos Jaburú | 25 | FW | | | | | | | 1997 | 1998 | 1999 | 2000 |
| (Angola) | Jacinto | | | | | | | | | | | 1998 | 1999 | |
| (Angola) | Joãozinho | | | | | 1992 | | | | | | | | |
| (Angola) | Johnny | | | | | | | | | | 1997 | 1998 | | 2000 |
| (Angola) | Keep | | | | | | | | | | | 1998 | | |
| (Angola) | Kito | | | | | | | | | | 1997 | 1998 | | |
| (Angola) | Kivota | | | GK | | | | | | | | | | 2000 |
| (Angola) | Likelo | | | | | | | | | | | 1998 | | |
| (Angola) | Lopes | | | | | | | | | | | | 1999 | 2000 |
| (Angola) | Luisão | | | | | 1992 | 1993 | | | | | | | |
| (Angola) | Luvuana | | | | | 1992 | | | | | | | | |
| (Angola) | Mapassa | | | | | | 1993 | | | | 1997 | 1998 | | |
| (Angola) | Maya | | | | | | | | | | | 1998 | | |
| (Angola) | Mbunga | | | | | | | | | | | | 1999 | 2000 |
| (Angola) | Merodaque | Merodaque Kissanga | | | | | | | | | 1997 | 1998 | | |
| (Angola) | Miguel | | | | | | | | | | 1997 | 1998 | 1999 | |
| (Angola) | Miguel Adão | | | | | 1992 | | | | | | | | |
| (Angola) | Miranda | | | | | | | | | | | | | 2000 |
| (Angola) | Mitó | | | | | 1992 | | | | | | | | |
| (Angola) | Natércio | | | | | | | | | | | | | 2000 |
| (Angola) | Ndumba | | | | | 1992 | | | | | | | | |
| (Angola) | Norberto | | | | | | 1993 | | | | | | | |
| (Angola) | Nseka | | | | | | 1993 | | | | | | | |
| (Angola) | Nzaji | | | | | | | | | | | | 1999 | 2000 |
| (Angola) | Orlando | Orlando Dias Camargo | | | | | 1993 | | | | | | | |
| (Angola) | Paulito † | Paulo Miguel Gaspar da Silva | | | | | | | | → | 1997 | | | |
| (Angola) | Pedro Jorge | Pedro Jorge | | GK | | | | | | | | | 1999 | 2000 |
| (Angola) | Pinto | | | | | | 1993 | | | | | | | |
| (Angola) | Polle | | | | | | 1993 | | | | | | | |
| (Angola) | Quintino † | Francisco Faila Quintino | 31 | FW | | 1992 | | | | | | | | |
| (Angola) | Rabe | | | | | 1992 | | | | | | | | |
| (Angola) | Roque | Roque André Sapiri | – | DF | | | | | | | | 1998 | 1999 | 2000 |
| (Angola) | Rosário | | | | | | | | | → | 1997 | 1998 | | |
| (Angola) | Rui | | | | | | 1993 | | | | | | | |
| (Angola) | Sanches | | | | | | | | | | | | | 2000 |
| (Angola) | Sena | Sebastião João Barreto | – | GK | | | | | | | 1997 | 1998 | | 2000 |
| (Angola) | Tostão | | | | | | | | | | | 1998 | | |
| (Angola) | Toy | | | | | 1992 | | | | | | | | |
| (Angola) | Zé Carico | | | | | | 1993 | | | | | | | |
| (Angola) | Zé Gordo | | | | | | | | | | | 1998 | | |
| (Angola) | Zito | | | | | | | | | | | 1998 | 1999 | |
| (Angola) | Zola | | | | | | 1993 | | | | 1997 | 1998 | | 2000 |

== 1980–1989 ==
G.D. Sagrada Esperança players 1980–1989

| Nat | Nick | Name | A | P | | A.C. | Artur Santos | | | A. | | A.S. |
| Nat | Nick | Name | A | P | 1980 | 1982 | 1984 | 1985 | 1986 | 1987 | 1988 | 1989 |
| Nat | Nick | Name | A | P | – | – | – | – | – | – | – | – |
|---|---|---|---|---|---|---|---|---|---|---|---|---|
| (Angola) | Abílio Macedo | Abílio Macedo | | GK | 1980 | 1982 | | | | | | |
| (Angola) | Abreu | Abreu Neto | | MF | | 1982 | 1984 | 1985 | | | 1988 | 1989 |
| (Angola) | Adé † | Adelino Cristóvão | | DF | | 1982 | | | | | | |
| (Angola) | Afonso | | | DF | | 1982 | | | | | | |
| (Angola) | André | André Siassoki | | | | 1982 | 1984 | 1985 | | | | |
| (Angola) | Antão | | | DF | 1980 | | | | | | | |
| (Angola) | António João | | | | | | | | 1986 | | | |
| (Angola) | Bragança | | | FW | | 1982 | | | | | | |
| (Angola) | Bukaka † | | | DF | | | | | 1986 | | 1988 | 1989 |
| (Angola) | Bumba | | | | | | | | 1986 | | | |
| (Angola) | Cadiebué | | | FW | | 1982 | | | | | | |
| (Angola) | Caló | | | | 1980 | | | | | | | |
| (Angola) | Cela | | | | | | 1984 | | | | | |
| (Angola) | Chibuabua † | Mário Chibuabua | | | | | | | | | 1988 | 1989 |
| (Angola) | Chiquele | | | | 1980 | | | | | | | |
| (Angola) | Coelho | | | DF | | 1982 | | | | | | |
| (Angola) | Daniel | | | MF | 1980 | | | | | | | |
| (Angola) | David | | | MF | | 1982 | 1984 | 1985 | | | | |
| (Angola) | Dé | | | | | 1982 | | | | | | |
| (Angola) | Dedé | | | | | | | | 1986 | | | |
| (Angola) | Domingos | | | DF | 1980 | 1982 | | | | | | |
| (Angola) | Esquerdinho Kuatula † | Duarte Adriano Kuatula | | MF | | 1982 | 1984 | 1985 | 1986 | | | 1989 |
| (Angola) | Fela | | | DF | 1980 | 1982 | 1984 | | | | | |
| (Angola) | Geraldo | | | | | | | | 1986 | | | |
| (Angola) | Gimbras | | | | | 1982 | | | | | | |
| (Angola) | Inácio | Alberto Inácio Muandumba | | FW | | | | 1985 | 1986 | | 1988 | |
| (Angola) | Inácio II | | | DF | | | | | 1986 | | | |
| (Angola) | Jaime | | | MF | 1980 | | | | | | | |
| (Angola) | João Carlos | | | | | | | 1985 | 1986 | | | |
| (Angola) | João Pereira | | | | | | | | 1986 | | | |
| (Angola) | Joãozinho | | | MF | | | 1984 | 1985 | 1986 | | 1988 | 1989 |
| (Angola) | José | | | DF | 1980 | | | | | | | |
| (Angola) | Jujú | | | | | | | | 1986 | | | |
| (Angola) | Kito | | | FW | 1980 | 1982 | | | | | | |
| (Angola) | Kuba | | | | | | | 1985 | | | | |
| (Angola) | Leonardo | | | | | | | 1985 | 1986 | | | |
| (Angola) | Lourenço | | | | | | | | 1986 | | | |
| (Angola) | Lumbua | | | FW | 1980 | 1982 | 1984 | 1985 | 1986 | | | |
| (Angola) | Luvuana | | | GK | | | 1984 | 1985 | 1986 | | 1988 | 1989 |
| (Angola) | Man'Adão | | | FW | | | | | | | 1988 | 1989 |
| (Angola) | Mickey | | | | | | | | 1986 | | | |
| (Angola) | Miguel | | | | | | 1984 | 1985 | 1986 | | 1988 | 1989 |
| (Angola) | Muloe | | | FW | 1980 | | | | | | | |
| (Angola) | Oliveira | | | DF | 1980 | | | | | | | |
| (Angola) | Osvaldo | | | | | | | | 1986 | | | |
| (Angola) | Pontes | | | GK | | 1982 | 1984 | 1985 | | | | |
| (Angola) | Quim Zé | | | MF | 1980 | 1982 | | | | | | |
| (Angola) | Quintino † | Francisco Faila Quintino | – | FW | | | 1984 | 1985 | 1986 | | 1988 | 1989 |
| (Angola) | Romano | Romano Veiga | | DF | | 1982 | 1984 | 1985 | 1986 | | 1988 | 1989 |
| (Angola) | Rui | | | MF | 1980 | 1982 | | | | | | |
| (Angola) | Rui Paulino | Rui Paulino | | FW | | 1982 | 1984 | 1985 | | | 1988 | 1989 |
| (Angola) | Rui Sapiri | Rui Sapiri | 26 | DF | | 1982 | 1984 | 1985 | 1986 | | 1988 | 1989 |
| (Angola) | Sabú | | | FW | | | 1984 | 1985 | 1986 | | | |
| (Angola) | Sakaneno | Sakaneno Tomás | | DF | | | 1984 | 1985 | 1986 | | | |
| (Angola) | Sérgio | | | | | | 1984 | 1985 | 1986 | | | |
| (Angola) | Silva | | | DF | 1980 | | | | | | | |
| (Angola) | Tela | | | MF | 1980 | | | | | | | |
| (Angola) | Tobias | | | MF | | 1982 | | | | | | |
| (Angola) | Toko | Toko Nkano | | DF | | 1982 | | | | | | |
| (Angola) | Toy | | | DF | | | | 1985 | 1986 | | 1988 | 1989 |
| (Angola) | Vicky | André Vicky | | FW | | 1982 | 1984 | 1985 | | | | |
| (Angola) | Vinte e Cinco | | | DF | | 1982 | 1984 | | | | | |
| (Angola) | Zé Manel | | | | 1980 | | | | | | | |
| (Angola) | Zeca | | | GK | 1980 | 1982 | | | | | | |
| (Angola) | Zito | | | DF | 1980 | | | | | | | |

== See also ==
- Category:G.D. Sagrada Esperança players
