= 2015 Angola Cup =

Tournament details
- Country: Angola
- Dates: 17 Jun - 31 Oct 2015
- Teams: 23

Final positions
- Champions: Bravos do Maquis
- Runners-up: Sagrada Esperança
- Confederation Cup: Sagrada Esperança (runner-up)

Tournament statistics
- Matches played: 32
- Goals scored: 92 (2.88 per match)

The 2015 Taça de Angola was the 34th edition of the Taça de Angola, the second most important and the top knock-out football club competition in Angola, following the Girabola. Benfica de Luanda were the defending champions, having beaten Petro de Luanda 1–0 in the previous season's final.

Bravos do Maquis who were entitled to participate in the 2016 CAF Confederation Cup as the cup winner, later withdrew for financial reasons, giving way for the runner-up, Sagrada Esperança.

== Stadiums and locations ==
Locations of the 2015 Angola Cup teams

P	Team	Home city	Stadium	Capacity	2014	Current	P
5	4 de Abril	Menongue	Campo Municipal	5,000	R16	R16	Steady
6	Académica do Lobito	Lobito	Estádio do Buraco	3,000	DNP	PR	n/a
6	ASA	Luanda	Estádio da Cidadela	60,000	R16	PR	▼1
5	Benfica de Luanda	Luanda	Estádio dos Coqueiros	8,000	Champion	R16	▼3
1	Bravos do Maquis	Luena	Estádio Mundunduleno	4,300	R16	Champion	▲4
5	Desportivo da Huíla	Lubango	Estádio do Ferrovia	15,000	QF	R16	▼1
4	Domant FC	Caxito	Municipal do Dande	5,000	PR	QF	▲2
3	Interclube	Luanda	Estádio 22 de Junho	7,000	R16	SF	▲2
5	Ismael FC	Uíge	Estádio 4 de Janeiro	12,000	DNP	R16	n/a
4	Kabuscorp	Luanda	Estádio dos Coqueiros	8,000	SF	QF	▼1
6	Mpatu a Ponta	Caxito	Campo da Açucareira	5,000	DNP	PR	n/a
3	Petro de Luanda	Luanda	Estádio 11 de Novembro	50,000	Runner-Up	SF	▼1
6	Polivalentes FC	Luanda	Estádio dos Coqueiros	8,000	PR	PR	Steady
5	Porcelana FC	N'dalatando	Municipal Santos Diniz	5,000	R16	R16	Steady
5	Primeiro de Agosto	Luanda	Estádio 11 de Novembro	50,000	QF	R16	▼1
6	Primeiro de Maio	Benguela	Estádio Edelfride Costa	6,000	PR	PR	Steady
4	Progresso do Sambizanga	Luanda	Estádio dos Coqueiros	8,000	SF	QF	▼1
6	Progresso da Lunda Sul	Saurimo	Estádio das Mangueiras	7,000	DNP	PR	n/a
6	Real M'buco	Cabinda	Estádio Nacional do Chiazi	25,000	DNP	PR	n/a
5	Recreativo da Caála	Caála	Estádio Mártires da Canhala	12,000	R16	R16	Steady
4	Recreativo do Libolo	Calulo	Estádio Municipal de Calulo	10,000	QF	QF	Steady
2	Sagrada Esperança	Dundo	Estádio Sagrada Esperança	8,000	R16	Runner-Up	▲3
5	Sporting de Cabinda	Cabinda	Estádio Nacional do Chiazi	25,000	QF	R16	▼1

== Championship bracket ==
Preliminary Rounds; Wed, 17 Jun 2015
Bravos do Maquis (bye)
Benfica Luanda (bye)
Rec do Libolo (bye)
1º de Agosto (bye)
Petro Atlético (bye)
Desportivo Huíla (bye)
Wed, 17 Jun 2015 (pen)
1º de Maio	6
Domant FC	7
Wed, 17 Jun 2015 (pen)
Porcelana FC	4
Mpatu a Ponta	2
Wed, 17 Jun 2015
Rec da Caála	1
Progresso L.S.	0
Wed, 17 Jun 2015 Walkover
Sagrada Esperança	3
Real M'buco	0
Wed, 17 Jun 2015 (pen)
Ismael FC	7
ASA	6
Kabuscorp (bye)
Progresso (bye)
Wed, 17 Jun 2015 (pen)
Polivalentes	5
4 de Abril	6
Wed, 17 Jun 2015 (pen)
Académica Lobito	6
Interclube	7
Sporting Cabinda (bye)

1/16 Finals; Wed, 22 Jul 2015
Wed, 22 Jul 2015
Bravos do Maquis	2
Benfica Luanda	1
Wed, 16 Sep 2015
Rec do Libolo	1
1º de Agosto	0
Wed, 22 Jul 2015
Petro Atlético	1
Desportivo Huíla	0
Wed, 22 Jul 2015
Domant FC	1
Porcelana FC	0
Wed, 22 Jul 2015 (pen)
Rec da Caála	6
Sagrada Esperança	7
Wed, 22 Jul 2015
Ismael FC	1
Kabuscorp	2
Wed, 22 Jul 2015 Walkover
Progresso	3
4 de Abril	0
Wed, 22 Jul 2015
Interclube	1
Sporting de Cabinda	0

Quarterfinals; Wed, 23 Sep 2015
Wed, 23 Sep 2015 (pen)
Rec Libolo	3
Bravos do Maquis	4
Wed, 23 Sep 2015
Petro Atlético	3
Domant FC	1
Wed, 23 Sep 2015 (pen)
Sagrada Esperança	4
Kabuscorp	3
Wed, 23 Sep 2015
Progresso	0
Interclube	2

Semifinals; Wed, 7 Oct 2015
Wed, 7 Oct 2015
Petro Atlético	0
Bravos do Maquis	1
Wed, 7 Oct 2015 (pen)
Sagrada Esperança	5
Interclube	4

Final; Sat, 31 Oct 2015
Sat, 31 Oct 2015
Bravos do Maquis	1
Sagrada Esperança	0

== Preliminary rounds ==
Wed, 17 Jun 2015 PR	Ismael FC	1–1 (a.e.t.) (7–6 p)	ASA	Uíge
15:00				Stadium: 4 de Janeiro

Wed, 17 Jun 2015 PR	Polivalentes	3–3 (a.e.t.) (2–3 p)	4 de Abril	Luanda
15:00				Stadium: Coqueiros

Wed, 17 Jun 2015 PR	1º de Maio	1–1 (a.e.t.) (5–6 p)	Domant FC	Benguela
15:30	Filipe 23'	Report	75' Cabibi I	Stadium: Edelfrides Costa; Referee: Julião Mateus
	Penalties
	Alex (penalty scored); Eduardo (penalty missed); Hélder (penalty scored); Kilombo (penalty scored); Muenho (penalty scored); Samuel (penalty scored)		(penalty scored) Alex; (penalty scored) Basta; (penalty scored) Cabibi I (penalty scored) Cabibi II; (penalty scored) Maninho; (penalty scored) Negra

Wed, 17 Jun 2015 PR	Porcelana FC	0–0 (a.e.t.) (4–2 p)	Mpatu a Ponta	Ndalatando
15:00				Stadium: Santos Diniz

Wed, 17 Jun 2015 PR	Sagrada	Walkover	Real M'buco	Dundo
15:00				Stadium: Sagrada Esperança

Wed, 17 Jun 2015 PR	Académica	2–2 (a.e.t.) (4–5 p)	Interclube	Lobito
15:30	Diogo; Lourenço		Dasfaa; Valdez	Stadium: Estádio do Buraco

Wed, 17 Jun 2015 PR	Rec da Caála	1–0	Progresso L.S.	Caála
15:00	Dudú Leite 51' (pen.)			Stadium: Mártires da Canhala

== Round of 16 ==
Wed, 22 Jul 2015 R16	Bravos do Maquis	2–1	Benfica de Luanda	Luena
15:00	Chonene 50'; Sílvio 75'	Report	Jeferson 51'	Stadium: Mundunduleno

Wed, 22 Jul 2015 R16	Ismael FC	1–2	Kabuscorp	Uíge
15:00	Rio 41'	Report	Meyong 39'; Patrick 92'	Stadium: 4 de Janeiro

Wed, 22 Jul 2015 R16	Rec da Caála	1–1 (a.e.t.) (5–6 p)	Sagrada Esperança	Caála
15:00				Stadium: Mártires da Canhala

Wed, 22 Jul 2015 R16	Progresso	Walkover	4 de Abril	Luanda
15:30				Stadium: Cidadela Desportiva

Wed, 22 Jul 2015 R16	Domant FC	1–0	Porcelana	Caxito
15:30	Fufuco 80'			Stadium: Municipal do Dande

Wed, 22 Jul 2015 R16	Petro de Luanda	1–0	Desportivo da Huíla	Luanda
16:00	Job 21'	Report		Stadium: 11 de Novembro

Wed, 22 Jul 2015 R16	Interclube	1–0	Sporting de Cabinda	Luanda
15:00	Dilman 40'	Report		Stadium: 22 de Junho

Wed, 16 Sep 2015 R16	Rec do Libolo	1–0	1º de Agosto	Calulo
15:00	Fredy 27' (pen.)	Report		Stadium: Municipal de Calulo

== Quarter-finals ==
Wed, 23 Sep 2015 QF	Sagrada	1–1 (a.e.t.) (3–2 p)	Kabuscorp	Dundo
15:00	Pilola 62'		77' Patrick	Stadium: Sagrada Esperança

Wed, 23 Sep 2015 QF	Progresso	0–2	Interclube	Luanda
15:00		Report	Moco 11' 64'	Stadium: Cidadela Desportiva

Wed, 23 Sep 2015 QF	Rec do Libolo	0–0 (a.e.t.) (3–4 p)	Bravos do Maquis	Calulo
15:00		Report		Stadium: Municipal de Calulo
	Penalties
	Rudy (penalty scored); Dário (penalty scored); Fredy (penalty scored); Eddie (penalty missed); Brito (penalty missed)		(penalty scored) Djo; (penalty scored) Ávalos; (penalty scored) Lelo; (penalty scored) Dinis; (penalty missed) Silva

Wed, 23 Sep 2015 QF	Petro de Luanda	3–1	Domant FC	Luanda
16:00	Jiresse (pen.)		Sílvio	Stadium: 11 de Novembro

== Semi-finals ==
Wed, 7 Oct 2015 SF	Petro de Luanda	0–1	Bravos do Maquis	Luanda
15:30		Report	Bruno 88'	Stadium: 11 de Novembro

Wed, 7 Oct 2015 SF	Sagrada	0–0 (a.e.t.) (5–4 p)	Interclube	Dundo
15:30		Report		Stadium: Sagrada Esperança

== Final ==
Sat, 31 October 2015
15:00

Bravos do Maquis	1–0	Sagrada Esperança
Bruno 90'	Report

Estádio dos Coqueiros, Luanda
Attendance: 3,000
Referee: João Ngoma

Maquis	Sagrada

GK	1	(Angola) Carlitos
RB	4	(Angola) Dinis
CB	24	(Angola) Ikuma
CB	27	(Angola) Lelo
LB	16	(Mozambique) Miro
RM	6	(Angola) Prazeres
CM	8	(Angola) Castro	(substituted off) 75'
CM	14	(Angola) Kiloy
LM	25	(Mozambique) Josemar
CF	9	(Angola) Chole	(substituted off) 90+3'
CF	11	(Angola) Benvindo (c)	(substituted off) 84'
Substitutions:
MF	28	(Namibia) Djo	(substituted on) 75'
MF	17	(Angola) Bruno	(substituted on) 84'
DF	19	(Angola) Sílvio	(substituted on) 90+3'
–
Manager:
(Angola) Alberto Cardeau

GK	22	(Angola) Yuri
RB	15	(Angola) Capuco
CB	2	(Angola) Hernâni	(yellow card) 88'
CB	25	(Angola) Lulas
LB	21	(Angola) Depaiza
RM	6	(Democratic Republic of the Congo) Carlos		(substituted off) 74'
CM	14	(Angola) Ary
CM	24	(Portugal) Oliveira		(substituted off) 62'
LM	29	(Angola) Larrama		(substituted off) 61'
CF	9	(Angola) Guedes (c)	(yellow card) 79'
CF	18	(Angola) Love
Substitutions:
DF	27	(Angola) Albano		(substituted on) 74'
FW	16	(Angola) Lelas		(substituted on) 61'
MF	28	(Angola) Zé Augusto	(yellow card) 90+2'	(substituted on) 62'
Manager:
(Croatia) Zoran Mačkić

Assistant referees:
Pedro Canombo
Júlio Lemos

2015 Angola Football Cup winner

1st title

Squad:
Alex, Carlitos, Kizamba, Pitchu (GK)
Chonene, Denis, Enoque, Ikuma, Kiloy, Lelo, Miro, Patrick, Prazeres, Sílvio (DF)
Ávalos, Breco, Capela, Castro, Djo, Joel, Josemar, Paizinho, Sapalo, Silva, Zé Kalanga (MF)
Benvindo, Chole, Quinzinho, Rasca (FW)
Alberto Cardeau (Head Coach)

== See also ==
- 2015 Girabola
- 2016 Angola Super Cup
- 2016 CAF Confederation Cup
- Bravos do Maquis players
- Sagrada Esperança players
