= 2014 Segundona =

Segundona
- Season: 2014 (July 27–Nov)
- Champions: Domant FC A Académica Lobito B Progresso L.S. C

The 2014 Segundona was the 20th season of the second-tier football league in Angola. The season runs from 27 July to November, 2014. Académica do Lobito the current league champions, were promoted to the 2015 Girabola.

The league comprises 3 series of 6, 5 and 6 teams with the winner of each series being promoted to the 2015 Girabola. At the end of the regular season, the three series winners will play a round-robin tournament to determine the league champion.

All teams play in a double round robin system (home and away).

== Serie A ==
| Pos | Team | Pld | W | D | L | GF | GA | GD | Pts | Qualification or relegation | DOM | REA | CON | POL | POR | ESP |
|---|---|---|---|---|---|---|---|---|---|---|---|---|---|---|---|---|
| 1 | Domant FC | 8 | 4 | 3 | 1 | 13 | 2 | +11 | 15 | Qualification for Girabola | | 3–0 | 0–2 | 0–0 | 3–0 | 2–0 |
| 2 | Real M'buco | 8 | 3 | 1 | 4 | 6 | 5 | +1 | 10 | | 0–1 | | 3–0 | 0–0 | 2–1 | 3–0 |
| 3 | Construtores do Uíge | 8 | 2 | 3 | 3 | 4 | 7 | −3 | 9 | | 0–2 | 1–0 | | 0–0 | 0–0 | 2–0 |
| 4 | Polivalentes FC | 6 | 1 | 5 | 0 | 5 | 2 | +3 | 8 | | 1–1 | 0–1 | 3–1 | | – | 1–0 |
| 5 | Porcelana FC | 7 | 1 | 4 | 2 | 5 | 4 | +1 | 7 | | 1–1 | 3–1 | 1–1 | 0–0 | | – |
| 6 | Esperança do Congo | 7 | 0 | 0 | 7 | 0 | 10 | −10 | 0 | | – | 0–1 | 0–3 | – | 1–2 | |

Updated to match(es) played on September 2014. Source: Girabola.com
Rules for classification: 1) Points; 2) Head-to-head points; 3) Head-to-head goal difference; 4) Goal difference; 5) Goals scored; 6) Fair-play points; 7) Play-off.

== Serie B ==
| Pos | Team | Pld | W | D | L | GF | GA | GD | Pts | Qualification or relegation | ACA | EVA | MPA | PHU | RSE |
|---|---|---|---|---|---|---|---|---|---|---|---|---|---|---|---|
| 1 | Académica do Lobito | 8 | 7 | 1 | 0 | 15 | 2 | +13 | 22 | Qualification for Girabola | | 0–0 | 3–2 | 2–1 | 3–0 |
| 2 | Evale FC | 8 | 3 | 2 | 3 | 9 | 9 | 0 | 11 | | 0–3 | | 0–1 | 0–2 | 1–0 |
| 3 | Mpatu a Ponta | 8 | 2 | 4 | 2 | 8 | 9 | −1 | 10 | | 0–1 | 2–2 | | 1–1 | 2–0 |
| 4 | Petro do Huambo | 8 | 2 | 3 | 3 | 11 | 10 | +1 | 9 | | 1–2 | 3–1 | 1–1 | | 3–0 |
| 5 | Recreativo do Seles | 8 | 0 | 2 | 6 | 2 | 13 | −11 | 2 | | 0–1 | 0–3 | 1–1 | 1–1 | |

Updated to match(es) played on September 2014. Source: Girabola.com
Rules for classification: 1) Points; 2) Head-to-head points; 3) Head-to-head goal difference; 4) Goal difference; 5) Goals scored; 6) Fair-play points; 7) Play-off.

== Serie C ==
| Pos | Team | Pld | W | D | L | GF | GA | GD | Pts | Qualification or relegation | PLS | MSC | JAC | 4AB | NOR | ACS |
|---|---|---|---|---|---|---|---|---|---|---|---|---|---|---|---|---|
| 1 | Progresso da Lunda Sul | 8 | 6 | 2 | 0 | 18 | 4 | +14 | 20 | Qualification for Girabola | | 2–0 | 2–1 | 3–0 | 3–0 | ~~5–0~~ |
| 2 | Malanje Sport Clube | 8 | 6 | 1 | 1 | 12 | 3 | +9 | 19 | | 0–0 | | 2–1 | 3–0 | 1–0 | ~~3–0~~ |
| 3 | Jackson Garcia | 8 | 3 | 0 | 5 | 9 | 14 | −5 | 9 | | 1–3 | 0–1 | | 1–0 | 3–2 | ~~1–0~~ |
| 4 | 4 de Abril | 8 | 2 | 1 | 5 | 5 | 11 | −6 | 7 | | 1–1 | 0–2 | 0–1 | | 1–0 | ~~3–0~~ |
| 5 | Norberto de Castro | 8 | 1 | 0 | 7 | 7 | 19 | −12 | 3 | | 1–4 | 0–3 | 3–2 | 1–2 | | ~~3–0~~ |
| 6 | Académica do Soyo (Note: Académica do Soyo were disqualified after suffering two losses by default.) | 9 | 1 | 0 | 8 | 5 | 20 | −15 | 0 | Disqualified | | ~~1–2~~ | | | | |

Updated to match(es) played on September 2014. Source: Girabola.com
Rules for classification: 1) Points; 2) Head-to-head points; 3) Head-to-head goal difference; 4) Goal difference; 5) Goals scored; 6) Fair-play points; 7) Play-off.

== League title playoff ==
| 14 November 2014 | Domant FC | 1–1 | Académica Lobito | Estádio das Mangueiras, Saurimo |
| 16:00 |

| 16 November 2014 | Progresso da LS | 1–0 | Domant FC | Estádio das Mangueiras, Saurimo |
| 16:00 | Agoya 39' |

| 17 November 2014 | Académica Lobito | 2–1 | Progresso da LS | Estádio das Mangueiras, Saurimo |
| 16:00 |

2014 Segundona winner
Académica Petróleos do Lobito
1st title

== See also ==
- 2014 Girabola
