= 2015 Segundona =

- Champions: Primeiro de Maio
- Matches played: 32
- Goals scored: 77 (2.41 per match)
- Biggest home win: Jackson Garcia 5-0 JGM (8 August 2015)
- Highest scoring: Jackson Garcia 5-0 JGM (8 August 2015); 4 de Abril 3-2 Casa Militar (8 August 2015)
- All statistics correct as of 21 March 2016.

The 2015 Segundona was the 21st season of the second-tier football league in Angola. The season ran from 11 July to 4 October 2015.

The league comprised 2 series of 6 teams, the winner of each series being automatically promoted to the 2016 Girabola while the runners-up of each group contested for the third spot. At the end of the regular season, the three series winners played a round-robin tournament to determine the league champion.

Real M'buco and Mpatu a Ponta who were supposed to contest in group A, withdrew citing financial reasons as did Malanje Sport Clube in group B for the same reason.

All teams in each group play in a double round robin system (home and away).

== Serie A ==
Pos	Team	Pld	W	D	L	GF	GA	GD	Pts	Qualification or relegation	POR	ISM	REN	POL
1	Porcelana FC	6	2	3	1	7	6	+1	9	Qualification for Girabola		1–1	2–2	1–0
2	Ismael FC	6	1	5	0	7	6	+1	8	Qualification for Girabola playoff	1–1		2–1	0–0
3	Renascimento	6	1	3	2	7	8	−1	6		1–0	1–1		1–1
4	Polivalentes FC	6	1	3	2	6	7	−1	6		1–2	2–2	2–1	

Updated to match(es) played on 16 July 2015. Source: Girabola.com
Rules for classification: 1) Points; 2) Head-to-head points; 3) Head-to-head goal difference; 4) Goal difference; 5) Goals scored; 6) Fair-play points; 7) Play-off.

== Serie B ==
Pos	Team	Pld	W	D	L	GF	GA	GD	Pts	Qualification or relegation	MAI	4AB	JAC	JGM	CAS
1	Primeiro de Maio (C)	8	7	0	1	11	3	+8	21	Qualification for Girabola		2–0	1–0	3–1	2–0
2	4 de Abril	8	4	3	1	12	8	+4	15	Qualification for Girabola playoff	1–0		2–2	3–1	3–2
3	Jackson Garcia	8	2	3	3	12	9	+3	9		0–1	1–2		5–0	2–1
4	J.G.M.	8	1	3	4	7	16	−9	6		0–1	1–1	1–1		1–1
5	Casa Militar (Note: Later changed their name to Cuando Cubango FC)	8	0	3	5	6	12	−6	3		0–1	0–0	1–1	1–2	

Updated to match(es) played on 16 July 2015. Source: Girabola.com
Rules for classification: 1) Points; 2) Head-to-head points; 3) Head-to-head goal difference; 4) Goal difference; 5) Goals scored; 6) Fair-play points; 7) Play-off.
(C) Champions

== 2016 Girabola playoff ==
26 Sep 2015	4 de Abril	2–0 (2–0 agg.)	Ismael FC	Menongue
16:00				Stadium: Campo da Banca

3*/4 Oct 2015	Ismael FC	0–2 (0–4 agg.)	4 de Abril	Uíge
16:00	Caixa (yellow card); Cristiano (yellow card)	Report	Gé 17'; Edgard 85'; Dudú (yellow card)	Stadium: 4 de Janeiro; Attendance: 13.000; Referee: Bernardo Nangolo; Ary Paulino, Tango Pitra

* The game was interrupted at 75 min due to heavy rain and resumed the following day for the remaining 15 minutes

== 2015 Segundona title match ==
Sun, 4 Oct 2015	Porcelana	0–1	1º de Maio	Estádio Santos Dinis, Ndalatando
16:00	Arsénio (yellow card)	Report	Megue 30' (o.g.); Eliseu (yellow card); Elizur (yellow card); Nelson (yellow card); Pike (yellow card)	Attendance: 3.000; Referee: Bernardo Moreira; Dário Gaspar, Nery Amador

2015 Segundona winner
Estrela Clube Primeiro de Maio
1st title

Squad: Bebé, Chiklay, Dani, Dino, Eduardo, Eliseu, Elizur, Feliciano, Filipe, Hélder, Kilombo, Leo, Mandinho, Muenho, Nelo, Nelson, Pike, Samuel, Tobias
Head coach: Joaquim Finda Mozer

== See also ==
- 2015 Girabola
