= 4 January Stadium tragedy =

2017 crowd crush in Angola

Coordinates: 07°37′25.5″S 15°03′29.1″E

The tragedy at 4 January Stadium was a stampede that occurred on 10 February 2017, at the 4 January Stadium in Uige, Angola. The incident happened during a first-division football match in the Angolan Championship between Santa Rita and Recreativo Libolo, when a crush at the stadium entrance caused the deaths of 17 people and injured 58 others.

== The events ==
On 10 February 2017, newly promoted club Santa Rita hosted Recreativo Libolo during the first matchday of the Angolan Championship. That day, the 4 January Stadium, which has a capacity of up to 12,000 people, was filled to its maximum as the game began. At the stadium entrance, numerous fans attempting to attend the match, including some without tickets, encountered a security cordon, leading to a stampede. Many individuals were crushed against barriers or trampled, including several children among the victims.

Inside the stadium, the match continued uninterrupted and concluded with the home team's defeat (0–1), while spectators within the stadium remained unaware of the tragedy. Official reports confirmed 17 fatalities and 58 injuries, though medical sources indicated at least 25 deaths.

== Causes and legal proceedings ==
Following a request from Angola's Ministry of Sports, the Angolan Football Federation (AFP) and local authorities launched an investigation to determine the cause of the stampede and to implement new safety measures.

Initially, the incident was attributed to the large influx of fans, which reportedly caused the entrance gates to collapse, resulting in the stampede. However, eyewitnesses on site accused security forces of being responsible for the tragedy. Witnesses claimed that police initially allowed small groups of fans to enter without verifying their tickets, while hundreds attempted to push their way into the stadium. Later, the police reportedly tried to disperse the crowd using tear gas, triggering the chaos.

On 21 February 2017, a preliminary investigation by the Angolan Football Federation concluded that the stampede was due to a failure in the security system. On 29 March, a second report by a commission ordered by Angolan President José Eduardo dos Santos determined that the responsibility for the accident was largely shared between the national police, the provincial football federation of Uige, the Santa Rita club, and the stadium management company.

According to the Luxembourg newspaper Le Quotidien, the investigation also highlighted "poor coordination between the AFP and Santa Rita" and a poor "decision by the police commissioner [...] not to open the gates." Although witnesses claimed that the use of tear gas by police was the trigger for the stampede, the report, supported by medical findings, indicated that "the victims did not inhale any harmful substances."

Angolan authorities did not initiate any judicial investigation into the matter.

== Reactions ==
The president of Santa Rita blamed the police for the tragedy, accusing them of committing a "serious error" by allowing the crowd to approach the stadium. Meanwhile, Recreativo Libolo summarized the match on their website with the headline: "Three points and a tragic end."

The Angolan Football Federation and the president of the Confederation of African Football (CAF), Issa Hayatou, issued a statement expressing "their condolences to the families of the victims" and wishing "a speedy recovery to the injured."

In a statement, Angolan President José Eduardo dos Santos expressed his sadness and criticized the police, stating, "It was a grave mistake to let so many people approach the stadium."

During the weekend of 11–12 February 2017, moments of silence were observed before professional first- and second-division matches in the Spanish and French championships in memory of the victims.
