= G.D. Renascimento =

Angolan sports club

Renascimento
- Full name: Grupo Desportivo Renascimento
- Founded: 3 May 2009; 16 years ago
- Ground: Estádio 4 de Janeiro, Uíge
- Manager: Ntemo Kikiri
- League: 2nd Division
- 2015: 3rd (Série A)

Grupo Desportivo Renascimento is an Angolan sports club from the northern city of Uíge.

The team currently plays in the Gira Angola, the Angolan second division championship.

== Achievements ==
- Angolan League: 0

- Angolan Cup: 0

- Angolan SuperCup: 0

- Gira Angola: 0

== Manager history ==
Sununu Daniel	(2011)
João Gonçalves da Silva	(2014)
Ntemo Kikiri	(2015)

== See also ==
- Girabola
