= Ismael FC =

Angolan sports club

- Full name: Ismael Futebol Clube
- Founded: 8 October 2014; 10 years ago
- Ground: Estádio 4 de Janeiro, Uíge
- Chairman: Octávio Ismael
- Manager: Nicolau da Costa Bodó
- League: 2nd Division
- 2015: 2nd (Série A)

Ismael Futebol Clube is an Angolan sports club from the northern city of Uíge.

In 2015, the team won the Uige province football championship and won the right to contest at the Gira Angola, the Angolan second division championship, for a spot at the Girabola.

== Achievements ==
- Angolan League: 0

- Angolan Cup: 0

- Angolan SuperCup: 0

- Gira Angola: 0

- Uíge provincial championship: 1

2015

== Manager history ==
Nicolau da Costa Bodó	(2015)

== See also ==
- Girabola
