= 1986 Girabola =

Girabola 1986
- Season: 1986 (–)
- Champions: Petro Luanda
- Relegated: Desportivo; Inter LS; Leões
- 1987 African Cup of Champions Clubs: Petro Luanda (Girabola winner)
- Matches played: 182

The 1986 Girabola was the eighth season of top-tier football competition in Angola. Estrela Clube Primeiro de Maio were the defending champions.

The league comprised 14 teams, the bottom three of which were relegated.

Petro Luanda were crowned champions, winning their 3rd title, while Desportivo de Benguela, Inter da Lunda Sul and Leões de Luanda were relegated.

Arsénio Ribeiro aka Túbia of Inter de Luanda finished as the top scorer with 20 goals.

== Changes from the 1985 season ==
Relegated: Dínamos do Kwanza Sul, Gaiatos de Benguela, Leões do Planalto
Promoted: FC de Cabinda, Inter da Lunda Sul, Leões de Luanda

Locations of the 1986 Girabola teams

== League table ==
Pos	Team	Pld	W	D	L	GF	GA	GD	Pts	Qualification or relegation
1	Petro de Luanda (C)	26	20	5	1	55	16	+39	45	Qualification for Champions Cup
2	Inter de Luanda (Note: Name later changed to Interclube)	26	12	8	6	51	37	+14	32	
3	Ferroviário da Huíla	26	12	6	8	39	33	+6	30	
4	Primeiro de Agosto	26	12	5	9	38	29	+9	29	
5	Sagrada Esperança	26	10	7	9	29	26	+3	27	
6	Petro do Huambo	26	9	9	8	23	20	+3	27	
7	TAAG (Note: Name later reverted to its original ASA)	26	9	8	9	28	33	−5	26	
8	FC de Cabinda	26	8	10	8	30	30	0	26	
9	Mambroa (Note: Name later reverted to its original Benfica do Huambo)	26	10	5	11	28	34	−6	25	
10	Desportivo da Chela (Note: Name later reverted to its original Benfica do Lubango)	26	7	11	8	30	24	+6	25	
11	Primeiro de Maio	26	8	8	10	22	25	−3	24	
12	Leões de Luanda (Note: Name later reverted to its original Sporting de Luanda) (R)	26	8	6	12	30	27	+3	22	Relegation to Provincial stages
13	Desportivo de Benguela (Note: Name later reverted to its original Sporting de Benguela) (R)	26	5	9	12	25	33	−8	19	Relegation to Provincial stages
14	Inter da Lunda Sul (R)	26	2	3	21	17	78	−61	7	Relegation to Provincial stages

Updated to match(es) played on 22 November 1986. Source: Girabola.com
Rules for classification: 1) Points; 2) Head-to-head points; 3) Head-to-head goal difference; 4) Goal difference; 5) Goals scored; 6) Fair-play points; 7) Play-off.
(C) Champions; (R) Relegated

== Results ==
Home \ Away	DBG	DCH	DTA	FCC	FHL	ILS	INT	LEO	MAM	PET	PHU	PRI	PRM	SAG
Desportivo de Benguela	—	3–3	1–1	0–2	2–3	5–0	1–1	1–1	1–0	0–2	0–0	0–1	1–0	0–1
Desportivo da Chela	1–0	—	0–0	1–1	0–0	3–0	3–3	1–1	0–1	1–2	1–0	4–0	1–1	1–0
Desportivo da TAAG	1–1	2–1	—	2–1	1–2	3–0	3–3	1–0	0–2	0–0	0–1	0–4	0–0	1–0
FC de Cabinda	1–1	1–0	1–2	—	1–0	5–0	0–0	0–1	1–1	0–3	1–0	1–2	1–2	1–1
Ferroviário da Huíla	2–1	1–1		4–2	—		0–2	3–1	1–1	0–3	2–0	3–2	1–0	2–2
Inter da Lunda Sul	0–2	0–2	2–3	0–0	0–2	—	2–2	1–0	2–1	1–2	0–0	0–5	0–3	1–3
Inter de Luanda	3–1	1–1	4–1	5–4	3–0		—	2–3	4–5	1–2	2–2	1–1	3–1	1–0
Leões de Luanda	2–1	0–0	0–1	0–1	2–1	7–1	1–2	—	1–2	0–1	0–1	0–1	2–0	1–1
Mambroa	0–0	0–2	3–2	0–1	0–2	3–1	1–0	0–3	—	0–1	0–2	2–2	2–0	2–1
Petro de Luanda	2–1	3–1	4–1	1–1	4–2	7–0	3–1	3–1	2–0	—	0–0	0–2	1–1	3–0
Petro do Huambo	3–0	0–0	0–0	1–1	0–1	3–1	0–1	2–0	1–1	0–1	—	1–0	0–0	1–0
Primeiro de Agosto	0–1	0–4	1–0	0–1	2–0	1–1	1–2	1–1	4–0	0–1	2–4	—	1–3	3–0
Primeiro de Maio	1–1	1–0	0–0	0–0	1–1	2–0	0–1	0–3	2–0	0–2	2–0	0–1	—	2–1
Sagrada Esperança	2–0	1–0	2–1	1–1	1–1	4–1	1–0	0–0	1–0	2–2	2–0	0–1	2–0	—

Updated to match(es) played on 22 November 1986. Source: girabola.com
Legend: Blue = home team win; Yellow = draw; Red = away team win.

== Season statistics ==
=== Scorers ===
R/T
R/T	DBG	DCH	DTA	FCC	FHL	ILS	INT	LEO	MAM	PET	PHU	PRI	PRM	SAG	TOTAL
1	16/2/86	16/2/86	15/2/86	16/2/86	16/2/86	16/2/86	16/2/86	15/2/86	16/2/86	15/2/86	15/2/86	16/2/86	16/2/86	16/2/86	_{15} 17
1	DBG–PRM 1–0	FCC–DCH 1–0	DTA–PHU 0–1	FCC–DCH 1–0; Fanfan '	FHL–PRI 3–2; Emílio 27'; Ndisso 52'; Esquerdinho 88'	MAM–ILS 3–1; Setenta 87'	INT–SAG 1–0; Túbia '	PET–LEO 3–1; Rui Paulino 30'	MAM–ILS 3–1; Ralph 1'pen. ? Maria '	PET–LEO 3–1; Pedro Ferro 62'; Jesus 72' 87'	DTA–PHU 0–1	FHL–PRI 3–2; Barbosa 6'; Vieira Dias 53'	DBG–PRM 1–0	INT–SAG 1–0	_{15} 17
2	23/2/86	23/2/86	23/2/86	23/2/86	22/2/86	22/2/86	22/2/86	22/2/86	23/2/86	22/2/86	23/2/86	23/2/86	23/2/86	22/2/86	_{21} 24
2	PHU–DBG 3–0	DCH–PRI 4–0; Lucas 9'; Currula 55'; Arsénio 77' ?	DTA–MAM 0–2	PRM–FCC 0–0	INT–FHL 3–0	LEO–ILS 7–1; Moperó '	INT–FHL 3–0; Túbia x3	LEO–ILS 7–1; Abreu ' Birinaite x3 Rui Paulino x2 Teófilo '	DTA–MAM 0–2; Aires x2	SAG–PET 2–2; Ofualuka '	PHU–DBG 3–0; Benjamim ' Bolingó ' Carlos Pedro '	DCH–PRI 4–0	PRM–FCC 0–0	SAG–PET 2–2	_{21} 24
3	2/3/86	2/3/86	2/3/86	2/3/86	2/3/86	2/3/86	2/3/86	1/3/86	2/3/86	2/3/86	2/3/86	2/3/86	2/3/86	1/3/86	_{16} 21
3	MAM–DBG 0–0	DCH–INT 3–3; Quim Sebas 45' 47'; Docas 82'	ILS–DTA 2–3; Jamaica 46'; Saúca 64'; Coreano 68'	FCC–PHU 1–0	PET–FHL 4–2; Barbosa ' Esquerdinho 48'	ILS–DTA 2–3	DCH–INT 3–3; Mendinho 10' 85'; Túbia 39'	LEO–SAG 1–1; Birinaite 23'	MAM–DBG 0–0	PET–FHL 4–2; Balalau 6'; Abel Campos ' Jesus '	FCC–PHU 1–0	PRM–PRI 0–1	PRM–PRI 0–1	LEO–SAG 1–1; Quintino 58'	_{16} 21
4	16/3/86	15/3/86	16/3/86	16/3/86	16/3/86	15/3/86	16/3/86	16/3/86	16/3/86	15/3/86	15/3/86	15/3/86	16/3/86	15/3/86	_{21} 25
4	DBG–DTA 1–1	PET–DCH 3–1	DBG–DTA 1–1	MAM–FCC 0–1	FHL–LEO 3–1; Nascimento 51'; Mavó 74'; Ndisso 82'	ILS–SAG 1–3; Zé Pedro 69'	INT–PRM 3–1; Mendinho ' Mingo x2	FHL–LEO 3–1; Abreu 27'	MAM–FCC 0–1	PET–DCH 3–1; Abel Campos x2 Jesus '	PRI–PHU 2–4; Almeida ' Aníbal ' Bolingó ' Picas '	PRI–PHU 2–4; Manuel Martins ' Nsuka '	INT–PRM 3–1; Cabinda '	ILS–SAG 1–3; Quintino 25' 36' 82'	_{21} 25
5	23/3/86	23/3/86	23/3/86	23/3/86	22/3/86	23/3/86	23/3/86	23/3/86	22/3/86	23/3/86	23/3/86	22/3/86	23/3/86	22/3/86	_{13} 19
5	DBG–ILS 5–0	DCH–LEO 1–1; Quim Sebas '	DTA–FCC 2–1; Jamaica 21'pen. Coreano 46'	DTA–FCC 2–1	SAG–FHL 1–1; Mavó '	DBG–ILS 5–0	PHU–INT 0–1; Mingo '	DCH–LEO 1–1; Birinaite 66'	PRI–MAM 4–0	PET–PRM 1–1; Armindo 5'	PHU–INT 0–1	PRI–MAM 4–0; Manuel Martins ' Ndunguidi ' Nelito Kwanza x2	PET–PRM 1–1; Fusso pen.	SAG–FHL 1–1; Quintino '	_{13} 19
6	30/3/86	29/3/86	30/3/86	30/3/86			29/3/86	30/3/86	29/3/86	30/3/86	30/3/86	30/3/86	30/3/86	29/3/86	
6	FCC–DBG 1–1	SAG–DCH 1–0	DTA–PRI 0–4	FCC–DBG 1–1	FHL–ILS –	FHL–ILS –	INT–MAM 4–5; Túbia 25' ? 65'; Mingo 38'	PRM–LEO 0–3	INT–MAM 4–5; Adão ? 77' 80' 87'; Naifa 64'	PHU–PET 0–1	PHU–PET 0–1	DTA–PRI 0–4	PRM–LEO 0–3	SAG–DCH 1–0	
7	13/4/86	4/5/86	12/4/86	13/4/86	4/5/86	13/4/86	12/4/86	12/4/86	13/4/86	13/4/86	12/4/86	13/4/86	13/4/86	13/4/86	_{9} 18
7	PRI–DBG 0–1; Orlando '	FHL–DCH 1–1; Quim Manuel 9'	INT–DTA 4–1; Alex 74'	FCC–ILS 5–0	FHL–DCH 1–1; Mavó 7'	FCC–ILS 5–0	INT–DTA 4–1; Túbia 32' 71' 85'; Mendinho 78'	LEO–PHU 0–1	MAM–PET 0–1	MAM–PET 0–1	LEO–PHU 0–1; Picas '	PRI–DBG 0–1	PRM–SAG 2–1	PRM–SAG 2–1	_{9} 18
8	3/5/86	19/4/86	19/4/86	19/4/86	1/6/86	19/4/86	3/5/86<	20/4/86	20/4/86	19/4/86	20/4/86	19/4/86	1/6/86	20/4/86	_{13} 15
8	DBG–INT 1–1; Nelson 8'pen.	ILS–DCH 0–2; Malé 15'pen. ?pen.	PET–DTA 4–1; Jamaica 58'pen.	PRI–FCC 0–1	FHL–PRM 1–0; Mavó 32'	ILS–DCH 0–2	DBG–INT 1–1; Mingo 36'	LEO–MAM 1–2; Vanda '	LEO–MAM 1–2; Capusso ' Figueiredo '	PET–DTA 4–1; Wilson 37'; Jesus ' Abel 47' 90'	PHU–SAG 1–0	PRI–FCC 0–1	FHL–PRM 1–0	PHU–SAG 1–0	_{13} 15
9	11/5/86	11/5/86	10/5/86	11/5/86	11/5/86	10/5/86	11/5/86	10/5/86	10/5/86	11/5/86	11/5/86	10/5/86	11/5/86	10/5/86	_{11} 21
9	DBG–PET 0–2	DCH–PRM 1–1; Adriano 51'	DTA–LEO 1–0; Saúca 17'	INT–FCC 5–4; Kasi x2 Gastão '	PHU–FHL 0–1	ILS–PRI 0–5	INT–FCC 5–4; Mendinho x2 Túbia x2 Mingo '	DTA–LEO 1–0	SAG–MAM 1–0	DBG–PET 0–2	PHU–FHL 0–1	ILS–PRI 0–5	DCH–PRM 1–1	SAG–MAM 1–0	_{11} 21
10	17/5/86	18/5/86	17/5/86	17/5/86	18/5/86	18/5/86	18/5/86	17/5/86	18/5/86	17/5/86	18/5/86	18/5/86	18/5/86	17/5/86	_{12} 17
10	LEO–DBG 2–1; Mingo 17'	DCH–PHU 1–0; Currula '	SAG–DTA 2–1; Saúca '	FCC–PET 0–3	MAM–FHL 0–2; Mavó 33'; Pedrito 83'	PRM–ILS 2–0	PRI–INT 1–2	LEO–DBG 2–1; Birinaite ? 77'	MAM–FHL 0–2	FCC–PET 0–3; Saavedra 9' ? Haia '	DCH–PHU 1–0	PRI–INT 1–2	PRM–ILS 2–0	SAG–DTA 2–1; Lumbua ' Rui Sapiri '	_{12} 17
11	25/5/86	25/5/86	24/5/86	24/5/86	24/5/86	24/5/86	24/5/86	24/5/86	25/5/86	25/5/86	25/5/86	25/5/86	25/5/86	25/5/86	_{7} 12
11	DBG–SAG 0–1	DCH–MAM 0–1	DTA–FHL 1–2	LEO–FCC 0–1	DTA–FHL 1–2	ILS–INT 2–2; David 36'; Zé Pedro 43'	ILS–INT 2–2; Aguião 76'; Lourenço 87'	LEO–FCC 0–1	DCH–MAM 0–1; Figueiredo 65'	PET–PRI 0–2	PHU–PRM 0–0	PET–PRI 0–2; Bula ' Ndunguidi pen.	PHU–PRM 0–0	DBG–SAG 0–1	_{7} 12
12	8/6/86	22/6/86	22/6/86	7/6/86	8/6/86	8/6/86	8/6/86	2/7/86	8/6/86	8/6/86	8/6/86	2/7/86	8/6/86	7/6/86	_{4} 19
12	FHL–DBG 2–1	DTA–DCH 2–1	DTA–DCH 2–1; Coreano 12'; Saúca '	FCC–SAG 1–1	FHL–DBG 2–1	PHU–ILS 3–1	INT–PET 1–2	PRI–LEO 1–1; Abreu 85'	PRM–MAM 2–0	INT–PET 1–2; Vieira Dias 61'	PHU–ILS 3–1	PRI–LEO 1–1	PRM–MAM 2–0	FCC–SAG 1–1	_{4} 19
13			2/7/86										2/7/86		_{0} 15
13	DCH–DBG 1–0	DCH–DBG 1–0	PRM–DTA 0–0	FCC–FHL 1–0	FCC–FHL 1–0	PET–ILS 7–0	LEO–INT 1–2	LEO–INT 1–2	PHU–MAM 1–1	PET–ILS 7–0	PHU–MAM 1–1	SAG–PRI 0–1	PRM–DTA 0–0	SAG–PRI 0–1	_{0} 15
14	6/7/86	6/7/86	19/10/86	6/7/86	5/7/86	5/7/86	5/7/86	6/7/86	5/7/86	6/7/86	19/10/86	5/7/86	6/7/86	5/7/86	_{4} 11
14	PRM–DBG 1–1	DCH–FCC 1–1	PHU–DTA 0–0	DCH–FCC 1–1	PRI–FHL 2–0	ILS–MAM 2–1	SAG–INT 1–0	LEO–PET 0–1	ILS–MAM 2–1	LEO–PET 0–1; Saavedra 46'	PHU–DTA 0–0	PRI–FHL 2–0; Manuel Martins ' Nsuka '	PRM–DBG 1–1	SAG–INT 1–0; Joãozinho '	_{4} 11
15	13/7/86	13/7/86	12/10/86	12/7/86	13/7/86	12/7/86	13/7/86	12/7/86	12/10/86	12/7/86	13/7/86	13/7/86	12/7/86	12/7/86	_{5} 18
15	DBG–PHU 0–0	PRI–DCH 0–4	MAM–DTA 3–2; Alex 2'; Maradona 68'	FCC–PRM 1–2	FHL–INT 0–2	ILS–LEO 1–0	FHL–INT 0–2	ILS–LEO 1–0	MAM–DTA 3–2; Maria 3'; Panzo 17'; Adão 30'	PET–SAG 3–0	DBG–PHU 0–0	PRI–DCH 0–4	FCC–PRM 1–2	PET–SAG 3–0	_{5} 18
16	27/7/86	27/7/86	27/7/86	27/7/86	27/7/86	27/7/86	27/7/86	27/7/86	27/7/86	27/7/86	27/7/86	27/7/86	27/7/86	27/7/86	_{3} 15
16	DBG–MAM 1–0	INT–DCH 1–1	DTA–ILS 3–0	PHU–FCC 1–1	FHL–PET 0–3	DTA–ILS 3–0	INT–DCH 1–1	SAG–LEO 0–0	DBG–MAM 1–0	FHL–PET 0–3; Avelino 30'; Paulão pen. Abel Campos 85'	PHU–FCC 1–1	PRI–PRM 1–3	PRI–PRM 1–3	SAG–LEO 0–0	_{3} 15
17	3/8/86	3/8/86	3/8/86	29/10/86	12/10/86	2/8/86	3/8/86	12/10/86	29/10/86	3/8/86	3/8/86	3/8/86	3/8/86	2/8/86	_{1} 17
17	DTA–DBG 1–1	DCH–PET 1–2	DTA–DBG 1–1	FCC–MAM 1–1	LEO–FHL 2–1	SAG–ILS 4–1	PRM–INT 0–1	LEO–FHL 2–1	FCC–MAM 1–1; Aires 53'	DCH–PET 1–2	PHU–PRI 1–0	PHU–PRI 1–0	PRM–INT 0–1	SAG–ILS 4–1	_{1} 17
18	9/8/86	10/8/86	9/8/86	9/8/86	10/8/86	9/8/86	9/8/86	10/8/86	10/8/86	10/8/86	9/8/86	10/8/86	10/8/86	10/8/86	_{2} 19
18	ILS–DBG 0–2	LEO–DCH 0–0	FCC–DTA 1–2; Saúca x2	FCC–DTA 1–2	FHL–SAG 2–2	ILS–DBG 0–2	INT–PHU 2–2	LEO–DCH 0–0	MAM–PRI 2–2	PRM–PET 0–2	INT–PHU 2–2	MAM–PRI 2–2	PRM–PET 0–2	FHL–SAG 2–2	_{2} 19
19	24/8/86	23/8/86	23/8/86	24/8/86	23/8/86	23/8/86	24/8/86	24/8/86	24/8/86	23/8/86	23/8/86	23/8/86	24/8/86	23/8/86	_{4} 9
19	DBG–FCC 0–2	DCH–SAG 1–0	PRI–DTA 1–0	DBG–FCC 0–2	ILS–FHL 0–2	ILS–FHL 0–2	MAM–INT 1–0	LEO–PRM 2–0; Abreu 85' 87'	MAM–INT 1–0; Ralph pen.	PET–PHU 0–0	PET–PHU 0–0	PRI–DTA 1–0; Bula 4'	LEO–PRM 2–0	DCH–SAG 1–0	_{4} 9
20	31/8/86	30/8/86	30/8/86	30/8/86	30/8/86	30/8/86	30/8/86	31/8/86	31/8/86	31/8/86	31/8/86	31/8/86	30/8/86	30/8/86	
20	DBG–PRI 0–1	DCH–FHL 0–0	DTA–INT 3–3; Coreano 21'; Saúca 50' 73'	ILS–FCC –	DCH–FHL 0–0	ILS–FCC –	DTA–INT 3–3; Pirocas 2'; Mingo 31'; Túbia 79'pen.	PHU–LEO 2–0	PET–MAM 2–0	PET–MAM 2–0	PHU–LEO 2–0	DBG–PRI 0–1	SAG–PRM 2–0	SAG–PRM 2–0; Joãozinho 37'; Quintino 45'	
21	6/9/86	7/9/86	7/9/86	6/9/86	7/9/86	7/9/86	6/9/86	7/9/86	7/9/86	7/9/86	6/9/86	6/9/86	7/9/86	6/9/86	_{11} 17
21	INT–DBG 3–1; Nelson 81'pen.	DCH–ILS 3–0; Adriano 24'; Serginho 65' ?	DTA–PET 0–0	FCC–PRI 1–2	PRM–FHL 1–1	DCH–ILS 3–0	INT–DBG 3–1; Mingo 18' 38'; Raúl 53'	MAM–LEO 0–3	MAM–LEO 0–3	DTA–PET 0–0	SAG–PHU 2–0	FCC–PRI 1–2; Nelito Kwanza 27'; Ndunguidi 60'	PRM–FHL 1–1	SAG–PHU 2–0; Quintino 66'; Esquerdinho 73'	_{11} 17
22	27/9/86	28/9/86	27/9/86	27/9/86	28/9/86	28/9/86	27/9/86	27/9/86	28/9/86	27/9/86	28/9/86	28/9/86	28/9/86	28/9/86	_{0} 12
22	PET–DBG 2–1	PRM–DCH 1–0	LEO–DTA 0–1	FCC–INT 0–0	FHL–PHU 2–0	PRI–ILS 1–1	FCC–INT 0–0	LEO–DTA 0–1	MAM–SAG 2–1	PET–DBG 2–1	FHL–PHU 2–0	PRI–ILS 1–1	PRM–DCH 1–0	MAM–SAG 2–1	_{0} 12
23	2/11/86	2/11/86	1/11/86	2/11/86	2/11/86	1/11/86	1/11/86	2/11/86	2/11/86	2/11/86	2/11/86	1/11/86	1/11/86	1/11/86	_{6} 12
23	DBG–LEO 1–1	PHU–DCH 0–0	DTA–SAG 1–0; Alex '	PET–FCC 1–1	FHL–MAM 1–1; Mavó 80'	ILS–PRM 0–3	INT–PRI 1–1	DBG–LEO 1–1	FHL–MAM 1–1; Panzo '	PET–FCC 1–1; Avelino 30'pen.	PHU–DCH 0–0	INT–PRI 1–1	ILS–PRM 0–3; Miúdo 7'; Sozinho 26'pen.	DTA–SAG 1–0	_{6} 12
24	8/11/86	9/11/86	9/11/86	8/11/86	9/11/86			8/11/86	9/11/86	9/11/86	8/11/86	9/11/86	8/11/86	8/11/86	
24	SAG–DBG 2–0	MAM–DCH 0–2	FHL–DTA –	FCC–LEO 0–1	FHL–DTA –	INT–ILS –	INT–ILS –	FCC–LEO 0–1	MAM–DCH 0–2	PRI–PET 0–1; Jesus 15'	PRM–PHU 2–0	PRI–PET 0–1	PRM–PHU 2–0	SAG–DBG 2–0	
25	16/11/86	16/11/86	16/11/86	15/11/86	16/11/86	15/11/86	15/11/86	16/11/86	16/11/86	15/11/86	15/11/86	16/11/86	16/11/86	15/11/86	
25	DBG–FHL 2–3	DCH–DTA 0–0	DCH–DTA 0–0	SAG–FCC 1–1	DBG–FHL 2–3	ILS–PHU –	PET–INT 3–1; Túbia '	LEO–PRI 0–1	MAM–PRM 2–0	PET–INT 3–1	ILS–PHU –	LEO–PRI 0–1; Vieira Dias '	MAM–PRM 2–0	SAG–FCC 1–1	
26			22/11/86	23/11/86	23/11/86	23/11/86	23/11/86	23/11/86	23/11/86	23/11/86	23/11/86	23/11/86	22/11/86	23/11/86	_{0} 25
26	DBG–DCH 3–3	DBG–DCH 3–3	DTA–PRM 0–0	FHL–FCC 4–2	FHL–FCC 4–2	ILS–PET 1–2	INT–LEO 2–3	INT–LEO 2–3	MAM–PHU 0–2	ILS–PET 1–2	MAM–PHU 0–2	PRI–SAG 3–0	DTA–PRM 0–0	PRI–SAG 3–0	_{0} 25
T	_{4} 25	_{16} 32						_{17} 31	_{19} 27	_{24} 55	_{8} 22				

=== Most goals scored in a single match ===
As of 12 April 1986

Player	For	Against	Result	Round	Date
4 goals (Poker)
(Angola) Adão	Mambroa	Inter de Luanda	4-5	6	29 March 1986
3 goals (Hat-trick)
(Angola) Birinaite	Leões de Luanda	Inter da Lunda Sul	7-1	2	22 February 1986
(Angola) Túbia	Inter de Luanda	Ferroviário da Huíla	3-0	2	22 February 1986
(Angola) Quintino	Sagrada Esperança	Inter da Lunda Sul	1-3	4	15 March 1986
(Angola) Túbia	Inter de Luanda	Mambroa	4-5	6	29 March 1986
(Angola) Túbia	Inter de Luanda	Desp. da TAAG	4-1	7	12 April 1986
