= Lulas =

Angolan footballer

Personal information
- Full name: Manuel Ngalula Sallo da Cunha
- Date of birth: 17 May 1996 (age 30)
- Place of birth: Dundo, Angola
- Position: Defender

Team information
- Current team: Sagrada Esperança
- Number: 25

Senior career*
| Years | Team | Apps | (Gls) |
| 2015– | Sagrada Esperança | 55 | (0) |

International career^{‡}
| 2018– | Angola | 1 | (0) |
- * Club domestic league appearances and goals as of 11:44, 9 July 2019 (UTC) ‡ National team caps and goals as of 11:44, 9 July 2019 (UTC)

Manuel Ngalula Sallo da Cunha (born 17 May 1996), commonly known as Lulas, is an Angolan footballer who currently plays as a defender for Sagrada Esperança.

== Career statistics ==
=== Club ===
As of 9 July 2019.

| Club | Season | League | | | Cup | | Continental | | Other | | Total | |
| Club | Season | Division | Apps | Goals | Apps | Goals | Apps | Goals | Apps | Goals | Apps | Goals |
|---|---|---|---|---|---|---|---|---|---|---|---|---|
| Sagrada Esperança | 2015 | Girabola | 13 | 0 | 2 (Note: Appearances in the Taça de Angola) | 0 | – | | 0 | 0 | 15 | 0 |
| Sagrada Esperança | 2016 | Girabola | 16 | 0 | 2 | 0 | 6 (Note: Appearances in the CAF Confederation Cup) | 0 | 0 | 0 | 24 | 0 |
| Sagrada Esperança | 2017 | Girabola | 4 | 0 | 0 | 0 | – | | 0 | 0 | 4 | 0 |
| Sagrada Esperança | 2018 | Girabola | 12 | 0 | 0 | 0 | – | | 0 | 0 | 12 | 0 |
| Sagrada Esperança | 2018–19 | Girabola | 10 | 0 | 0 | 0 | – | | 0 | 0 | 10 | 0 |
| Career total | | | 55 | 0 | 4 | 0 | 6 | 0 | 0 | 0 | 65 | 0 |

=== International ===
As of matches played 23 September 2018.

| National team | Year | Apps | Goals |
|---|---|---|---|
| Angola | 2018 | 1 | 0 |
| Total | | 1 | 0 |
