= C.D. Recreativo do Seles =

Angolan sports club

Recreativo do Seles
- Full name: Clube Desportivo Recreativo do Seles
- Ground: Estádio Cdte Hoji Ya Henda; Sumbe, Kwanza Sul, Angola
- Capacity: 3,000
- Manager: Ernesto Castanheira
- League: 2nd Division
- 2014: 5th (Série B)
Home colours

Clube Desportivo Recreativo do Seles is an Angolan sports club from the village of Seles, in the southern province of Kwanza Sul.

The team currently plays in the Gira Angola. Because their home stadium (Campo da Mangueira) failed to meet standard requirements by the Angolan Football Federation, the team has been playing its home games at the Estádio Comandante Hoji Ya Henda, in the capital city, Sumbe.

== Achievements ==
- Angolan League: 0

- Angolan Cup: 0

- Angolan SuperCup: 0

- Gira Angola: 0

== Manager history ==
(Angola) Ernesto Castanheira	(Jul 2014)	-

== See also ==
- Girabola
