= Malanje Sport Clube =

Angolan sports club

- Full name: Malanje Sport Clube
- Founded: 1 October 2008; 16 years ago
- Ground: Estádio 1º de Maio, Malanje
- Chairman: José Manuel
- Manager: Manuel Martins Bula
- League: 2nd Division
- 2014: 2nd (Série C)

Malanje Sport Clube is an Angolan sports club from Malanje, the capital city of the namesake province. The team currently plays in the Gira Angola.

== Achievements ==
- Angolan League: 0

- Angolan Cup: 0

- Angolan SuperCup: 0

- Gira Angola: 0

- Malanje provincial championship: 1

2015

== Manager history ==
(Angola) Manuel da Costa Nelinho	(2013)	-
(Angola) Manuel Martins Bula	(2014)	-

== See also ==
- Girabola
