= 2016 Girabola =

Girabola
- Season: 2016
- Champions: Primeiro de Agosto
- Relegated: Primeiro de Maio; 4 de Abril do Cuando; Porcelana FC
- Champions League: Primeiro de Agosto
- Matches played: 240
- Goals scored: 473 (1.97 per match)
- Top goalscorer: Gelson (23)
- Biggest home win: D'Agosto 5-0 Aca Lob (31 Jul 2016)
- Biggest away win: Interclube 1-6 D'Agosto (23 Oct 2016)
- Highest scoring: Interclube 1-6 D'Agosto (23 Oct 2016)
- Longest winning run: Petro de Luanda (8)
- Longest unbeaten run: Petro de Luanda (15)
- Longest winless run: Desportivo Huíla (14)
- Longest losing run: Porcelana (7)
- All statistics correct as of 5 November 2016.

The 2016 Girabola was the 38th season of top-tier football in Angola. The season ran from 19 February to 5 November 2016.

The league comprised 16 teams, the bottom three of which were relegated to the 2016 Provincial championships. 1º de Agosto won their first league title.

== Teams ==
A total of 16 teams contested the league, including 13 sides from the 2015 season and three promoted from the 2015 Segundona - 4 de Abril do KK, Porcelana and 1º de Maio.

Recreativo do Libolo were the defending champions from the 2015 season.

== Changes from 2015 season ==
Relegated: Bravos do Maquis, Domant FC, Sporting de Cabinda
Promoted: 4 de Abril do KK, Porcelana, 1º de Maio

=== Stadiums and locations ===
Locations of the 2015 Girabola teams

Team	Home city	Stadium	Capacity	2015 season
4 de Abril do K.K.	Menongue	Campo da Banca	?	3rd in Segundona
Académica do Lobito	Lobito	Estádio do Buraco	15,000	13th in Girabola
ASA	Luanda	Estádio da Cidadela	30,000	9th in Girabola
Benfica de Luanda	Luanda	Estádio 11 de Novembro	50,000	3rd in Girabola
Desportivo da Huíla	Lubango	Estádio do Ferroviário da Huíla	15,000	7th in Girabola
Interclube	Luanda	Estádio 22 de Junho	7,000	5th in Girabola
Kabuscorp	Luanda	Estádio dos Coqueiros	8,000	4th in Girabola
Petro de Luanda	Luanda	Estádio 11 de Novembro	50,000	8th in Girabola
Primeiro de Agosto	Luanda	Estádio 11 de Novembro	50,000	2nd in Girabola
Porcelana FC	Ndalatando	Estádio Santos Diniz	5,000	2nd in Segundona
Primeiro de Maio	Benguela	Estádio Edelfrides Costa	6,000	1st in Segundona
Progresso do Sambizanga	Luanda	Estádio da Cidadela	30,000	12th in Girabola
Progresso da Lunda Sul	Saurimo	Estádio das Mangueiras	7,000	6th in Girabola
Recreativo da Caála	Caála	Estádio Mártires da Canhala	12,000	11th in Girabola
Recreativo do Libolo	Calulo	Estádio Municipal	10,000	Girabola Champions
Sagrada Esperança	Dundo	Estádio Sagrada Esperança	8,000	10th in Girabola

== League table ==
Pos	Team	Pld	W	D	L	GF	GA	GD	Pts	Qualification or relegation
1	Primeiro de Agosto (C)	30	20	6	4	60	22	+38	66	Qualification for Champions League
2	Petro de Luanda	30	19	7	4	37	14	+23	64	
3	Recreativo do Libolo	30	17	9	4	49	26	+23	60	
4	Progresso LS	30	13	7	10	25	20	+5	46	
5	Kabuscorp	30	13	7	10	30	24	+6	46	
6	Benfica Luanda	30	13	5	12	29	24	+5	44	
7	Interclube	30	11	8	11	28	32	−4	41	
8	Progresso do Sambizanga	30	8	15	7	23	23	0	39	
9	Sagrada Esperança	30	9	10	11	23	23	0	37	
10	Desportivo da Huíla	30	10	6	14	29	39	−10	36	
11	Recreativo da Caála	30	8	10	12	27	26	+1	34	
12	Académica do Lobito	30	9	7	14	26	38	−12	34	
13	ASA	30	10	3	17	28	43	−15	33	
14	4 de Abril (R)	30	6	13	11	21	27	−6	31	Relegation to Provincial stages
15	Primeiro de Maio (R)	30	7	8	15	24	44	−20	29	Relegation to Provincial stages
16	Porcelana FC (R)	30	5	3	22	14	48	−34	18	Relegation to Provincial stages

Updated to match(es) played on 5 November 2016. Source: Girabola.com
Rules for classification: 1) Points; 2) Head-to-head points; 3) Head-to-head goal difference; 4) Goal difference; 5) Goals scored; 6) Fair-play points; 7) Play-off.
(C) Champions; (R) Relegated

== Results ==
Home \ Away	4AB	ACA	ASA	BEN	DHL	INT	KAB	PET	POR	PRI	PRL	PRM	PRO	RCA	RLB	SAG
4 de Abril do KK	—	3–0	1–1	2–0	0–0	0–0	3–1	0–1	1–2	0–0	1–0	2–1	1–2	0–0	0–0	0–0
Académica do Lobito	2–0	—	0–1	0–0	2–2	0–0	2–1	2–0	1–0	1–3	1–2	3–1	0–0	2–2	1–1	1–2
ASA	2–0	3–1	—	1–4	1–2	2–1	0–1	0–0	2–0	0–3	0–1	3–0	1–1	3–1	1–0	1–2
Benfica de Luanda	1–0	1–0	0–1	—	4–0	3–1	0–1	0–0	0–0	0–2	2–1	1–0	0–0	1–0	2–3	1–0
Desportivo da Huíla	3–1	1–2	3–1	1–0	—	2–0	1–1	0–0	0–1	1–2	0–1	2–2	1–2	1–3	2–1	1–0
Interclube	1–1	1–2	1–0	1–0	1–0	—	0–0	1–2	0–1	1–6	1–0	0–0	0–0	1–1	1–2	2–1
Kabuscorp	3–0	2–0	2–0	1–0	2–1	0–1	—	0–1	3–0	2–0	0–2	1–0	0–0	3–1	0–1	1–0
Petro de Luanda	1–0	1–0	3–0	2–0	2–0	1–2	1–0	—	1–0	1–0	1–0	3–1	1–0	1–1	1–1	3–0
Porcelana FC	2–1	1–2	1–2	0–2	0–1	0–1	2–1	0–1	—	1–2	0–0	1–0	0–2	0–2	1–4	0–3
Primeiro de Agosto	2–0	5–0	3–0	2–1	4–1	3–3	2–0	1–0	2–1	—	3–1	3–1	3–0	1–0	3–1	1–1
Progresso da Lunda Sul	1–0	1–0	1–0	0–1	1–0	1–0	0–1	2–2	3–0	1–0	—	0–1	0–0	2–1	0–1	0–0
Primeiro de Maio	0–0	0–1	2–1	2–1	1–1	0–0	1–1	0–2	1–0	1–3	1–1	—	0–0	3–2	2–4	1–0
Progresso do Sambizanga	1–1	0–0	1–0	2–3	0–1	2–1	0–0	0–2	0–0	1–1	1–1	2–1	—	0–0	1–0	2–0
Recreativo da Caála	0–0	1–0	2–0	0–1	0–1	0–1	3–0	1–2	2–0	2–0	0–1	0–0	2–1	—	0–0	0–0
Recreativo do Libolo	2–2	2–0	4–0	1–0	1–0	2–1	1–1	1–1	4–2	0–0	2–1	3–0	2–2	1–0	—	2–0
Sagrada Esperança	0–0	1–0	0–2	0–0	3–0	0–2	1–1	1–0	3–0	2–0	0–0	3–0	1–0	0–0	1–2	—

Updated to match(es) played on 5 November 2016. Source: girabola.com
Legend: Blue = home team win; Yellow = draw; Red = away team win.

=== Positions by round ===
Team ╲ Round	1	2	3	4	5	6	7	8	9	10	11	12	13	14	15	16	17	18	19	20	21	22	23	24	25	26	27	28	29	30
1º de Agosto	1	1	1	1	1	1	1	1	1	1	1	1	1	1	1	1	1	1	1	1	1	1	1	1	1	1	1	1	1	1
Petro de Luanda	5	11	7	5	5	5	4	5	3	2	3	5	3	3	3	3	3	3	3	3	3	3	3	3	3	3	2	2	2	2
Recreativo do Libolo	1	4	3	2	2	2	3	3	5	3	2	3	2	2	2	2	2	2	2	2	2	2	2	2	2	2	3	3	3	3
Progresso Lunda Sul	10	9	9	14	14	13	11	10	8	9	10	10	7	8	8	7	7	5	8	7	7	6	6	6	6	6	5	5	5	4
Kabuscorp	1	4	3	6	3	4	5	7	6	7	5	4	5	5	4	4	4	4	4	5	5	4	4	4	5	4	4	4	4	5
Benfica de Luanda	13	15	8	7	7	9	6	4	2	4	6	6	6	7	7	10	9	10	10	6	6	7	8	7	8	7	7	6	6	6
Interclube	5	2	6	4	6	7	7	6	7	6	4	2	4	4	5	5	5	6	5	4	4	5	5	5	4	5	6	7	7	7
Progresso	8	13	15	10	9	10	10	9	9	9	8	8	9	11	11	9	10	9	8	9	8	8	7	7	9	9	8	8	8	8
Sagrada Esperança	10	6	8	12	11	6	7	8	10	8	9	9	10	6	6	6	6	7	8	10	11	10	11	11	8	8	9	10	10	9
Desportivo da Huíla	5	2	2	3	4	3	2	2	4	5	7	7	8	10	10	11	11	11	12	12	14	12	13	12	13	12	11	11	11	10
Recreativo da Caála	13	14	16	16	16	16	15	15	15	12	12	12	11	9	9	8	8	7	6	8	9	9	9	10	10	10	10	9	9	11
Académica do Lobito	13	9	9	15	15	15	16	16	16	16	16	15	13	13	13	14	15	16	16	14	13	15	15	15	15	14	14	14	13	12
ASA	1	7	5	7	10	8	9	11	12	15	15	16	15	15	15	12	13	14	11	11	10	11	10	9	11	11	13	13	14	13
4 de Abril do KK	10	7	9	13	12	12	12	13	11	14	14	13	12	12	12	13	14	13	14	15	12	14	12	13	12	13	12	12	12	14
1º de Maio	13	16	13	11	13	14	14	12	13	11	11	11	14	14	14	15	12	12	13	13	15	13	14	14	14	15	15	15	15	15
Porcelana	8	12	14	9	8	11	13	14	14	12	13	14	16	16	16	16	16	15	15	16	16	16	16	16	16	16	16	16	16	16

Leader (2017 CAF Champions League)
Relegation to 2017 Provincial stages

Source: Girabola

=== Clubs season progress ===
Team ╲ Round	1	2	3	4	5	6	7	8	9	10	11	12	13	14	15	16	17	18	19	20	21	22	23	24	25	26	27	28	29	30
4 de Abril	L	W	L	L	W	L	D	D	D	L	D	D	W	D	D	L	L	D	D	L	W	D	D	D	W	L	W	L	D	L
Académica Lobito	L	W	L	L	L	D	L	L	D	L	W	W	W	L	D	L	L	D	L	W	D	L	D	L	L	W	D	W	W	W
ASA	W	L	W	L	W	L	L	L	L	L	L	D	W	L	D	W	L	L	W	W	W	L	W	L	L	D	L	L	L	W
Benfica de Luanda	L	L	W	W	W	W	W	W	W	L	L	L	L	L	D	L	W	D	W	W	L	D	D	L	W	L	W	W	D	W
Desportivo da Huíla	W	W	W	D	L	W	W	D	L	L	D	L	L	L	L	L	L	L	D	D	L	W	L	W	L	W	D	L	W	W
Interclube	W	W	L	L	L	D	W	L	L	W	W	W	D	D	D	L	D	L	W	W	W	L	D	D	W	L	L	L	D	L
Kabuscorp	W	D	W	L	W	D	D	L	W	L	W	W	L	W	W	L	L	D	W	D	W	D	D	W	L	W	L	W	L	L
Petro de Luanda	W	L	W	W	L	W	D	D	W	W	L	D	W	W	L	W	W	D	D	D	W	W	W	W	W	W	W	W	D	W
Porcelana FC	D	L	L	W	W	L	L	L	L	W	L	D	L	L	L	L	W	W	L	L	L	L	D	L	L	L	L	L	L	L
1º de Agosto	W	W	W	W	W	L	W	D	W	W	W	L	D	W	W	W	D	D	W	L	W	D	D	W	W	W	W	W	W	L
1º de Maio	L	W	L	D	L	D	D	W	L	W	L	D	L	D	D	L	W	L	D	D	L	W	L	L	L	L	L	L	W	W
Progresso	D	L	L	W	W	D	D	D	W	L	W	D	L	L	D	W	D	W	D	D	D	D	D	D	D	D	W	L	W	L
Progresso L. Sul	L	W	L	L	L	W	W	D	W	L	D	W	D	D	L	W	W	D	L	W	L	W	D	W	L	D	W	W	L	W
Recreativo da Caála	L	L	L	L	L	W	D	W	L	W	D	D	W	W	D	W	D	W	D	L	L	D	D	L	D	L	D	W	L	L
Recreativo do Libolo	W	D	W	W	L	D	D	D	W	W	D	D	W	W	W	W	W	W	L	D	W	D	D	W	W	W	L	W	W	L
Sagrada Esperança	L	L	W	W	W	L	D	L	W	D	L	W	D	W	D	W	L	D	L	L	L	D	D	D	W	D	D	L	L	W

== Season statistics ==
=== Top scorers ===
As of 5 November 2016

Rank	Scorer	Club	Goals
1	(Angola) Gelson	1º de Agosto	23
2	(Angola) Ary Papel	1º de Agosto	12
3	(Democratic Republic of the Congo) Mongo	Progresso Lunda Sul	10
4	(Brazil) Thiago Azulão	Petro de Luanda	9
4	(Angola) Paizinho	Recreativo da Caála	9
6	(Angola) Moco	Interclube	8
6	(Angola) Nelito	ASA	8
6	(Angola) Yano	Progresso	8
9	(Angola) Dário	Recreativo do Libolo	7
9	(Angola) Geraldo	1º de Agosto	7
9	(Angola) Mano	Kabuscorp	7
9	(Brazil) Luiz Phellype	Recreativo do Libolo	7

=== Hat-tricks ===
Player	For	Against	Result	Date
Brito	Recreativo do Libolo	1º de Maio	2-4	21 February 2016
Gelson	1º de Agosto	Recreativo do Libolo	3-1	10 April 2016

2017 Girabola winner
Clube Desportivo Primeiro de Agosto
11th title

Squad:
Dominique, Julião, Tony Cabaça (GK)
Dani, Diakité, Fissy, Isaac, Paizo, Sargento, Vado (DF)
Ary Papel, Buá, Geraldo, Gogoró, Ibukun, Jumisse, Manucho, Milambo, Mingo Bile, Nelson (MF)
Gelson, Makiavala, Patrick, Romaric (FW)
Dragan Jović (Head Coach)

Top Scorer
(Angola) Gelson
