= Chico (footballer, born 1991) =

Angolan footballer (born 1991)

Personal information
- Full name: Carlos Francisco Diassonama Panzo Bunga
- Date of birth: 24 September 1991 (age 35)
- Place of birth: Luanda, Angola
- Height: 1.88 m (6 ft 2 in)
- Position: Forward

Team information
- Current team: Sagrada Esperança

Senior career*
Years	Team	Apps	(Gls)
2011–2013	Progresso Sambizanga		
2014–2015	Rec do Libolo	19	(11)
2016–2017	Interclube	22	(14)
2017–2017	ASA	21	(11)
2018–	Bravos do Maquis	26	(14)
2019–	Sagrada Esperança		

International career
2019–	Angola	1	(0)
- * Club domestic league appearances and goals

Carlos Francisco Diassonama Panzo Bunga (born 24 September 1991), known as Chico, is an Angolan professional footballer who plays for Sagrada Esperança as a striker.

In 2018, he signed in for F.C. Bravos do Maquis.

In 2019–20, he signed in for Sagrada Esperança in the Angolan league, the Girabola.
