= Esperança Real FC do Congo =

Angolan sports club

Esperança do Congo
- Full name: Esperança Real Futebol Clube do Congo
- Founded: 3 March 1978; 48 years ago
- Ground: Estádio dos Imbondeiros; Zaire, Angola
- Capacity: 3,000
- Manager: João Baptista
- League: 2nd Division
- 2014: Withdrew
Home colours

Esperança Real FC do Congo is an Angolan sports club from the city of Mbanza Congo, in the northern province of Zaire. The team currently plays in the Gira Angola.

== Achievements ==
- Angolan League: 0

- Angolan Cup: 0

- Angolan SuperCup: 0

- Gira Angola: 0

== Manager history ==
(Angola) João Baptista	(2014)	-

== See also ==
- Girabola
