= 4 de Abril F.C. do Cuando Cubango =

Angolan sports club

4 de Abril
- Full name: 4 de Abril Futebol Clube do Cuando Cubango
- Ground: Campo Municipal, Menongue
- Capacity: 5,000
- Chairman: n/a
- Manager: n/a
- League: Girabola
- 2016: 14th
Home colours

4 de Abril Futebol Clube do Cuando Cubango, simply 4 de Abril is an Angolan sports club from the city of Menongue, in the southern province of Kuando Kubango.

The club is named after and in honor of April 4 2002, the day when the Angolan government and the rebels of UNITA signed a memorandum of understanding, as an addendum to the Lusaka Protocol that ended 27 years of a civil war that erupted right after the declaration of Angola's independence in 1975. The day has been declared as the Day of Peace in Angola and a national holiday.

In 2015, the team finished 2nd in its series at the Gira Angola, Angola's second division championship and won a 2-leg playoff against the 2nd-ranked of the other Gira Angola series to secure a spot at the 2016 Girabola.

== Achievements ==
- Angolan League: 0

- Angolan Cup: 0

- Angolan SuperCup: 0

- Gira Angola: 0

== Recent seasons ==
4 de Abril FC's season-by-season performance since 2011:

Overall match statistics
Season	Pld	W	D	L	GF	GA	GD	%
2016	31	6	13	12	21	28	–7	0.387
2015	10	6	3	1	16	8	+8	0.650

Classifications
L3	L2	L1	AC	SC
		14th	PR	
1st	2b		R16	

Top season scorers
Player	L3	L2	L1	AC	SC	T
Dany			6	0		6
?	?	?		?		?

- PR = Preliminary round, 1R = First round, GS = Group stage, R32 = Round of 32, R16 = Round of 16, QF = Quarter-finals, SF = Semi-finals

== Players and staff ==
=== Staff ===
Name	Nat	Pos
Technical staff
—	(Angola)	Head coach
—	(Angola)	Assistant coach
—	(Angola)	Goalkeeper coach
Medical
—	(Angola)	Physio
Management
—	(Angola)	Chairman

== Manager history ==
- (Angola) João Machado (2013–2016)

== See also ==
- Girabola (2016)
- Gira Angola (2014), (2015)
