= Estádio do Buraco =

Football stadium in Lobito, Angola

Coordinates: 12°23′33.648″S 13°33′13.1148″E

- Interactive map of Estádio do Buraco
- Location: Lobito, Benguela, Angola
- Capacity: 5,000

Construction
- Renovated: June 30, 2007; 19 years ago November 22, 2009; 16 years ago

Tenant
- Académica do Lobito

Estádio do Buraco is a football stadium in Lobito, Benguela Province, Angola.

It is owned by Académica Petróleos do Lobito and holds 5,000 people.

== History ==
The Estádio do Buraco was built in the 1970s, at the Bairro Santa Cruz.

In 1999, the stadium was the venue of the 1–2 home defeat of Académica to Atlético Sport Aviação, a result that relegated Académica to the 2nd rank in the overall Girabola classification of that year.

On April 3, 2003, the stadium was the venue for Académica's 2–3 home defeat to DRC's TP Mazembe.

In 2004, Académica played their home games at the União da Catumbela-owned Estádio Comandante Fragoso de Matos in the neighboring town of Catumbela following a ban on dirt-pitch football stadiums issued by the Angolan Football Federation.

In 2007, the stadium was reinaugurated with the installation of new grass, following a 7-year period of inactivity.

The 110x68m stadium underwent a major rehabilitation in the wake of the 2010 Africa Cup of Nations hosted by Angola, with the installation of a new fence, four sets of led lights, new goal posts and a UK-imported natural grass. It now features three new dressing rooms as well. It was the training ground of the Morocco national football team in that event.
