= C.D. Escola Norberto de Castro =

Angolan football club

Norberto de Castro
- Full name: Clube Desportivo Escola Norberto de Castro
- Ground: Estádio da Cidadela; Luanda, Angola
- Capacity: 5,000
- Chairman: Norberto de Castro
- Manager: Carlos Azulinho
- League: 2nd Division
- 2014: 5th (Série C)
Home colours

Clube Desportivo Escola Norberto de Castro is an Angolan sports club from Viana, Luanda. The team currently plays in the Gira Angola and plays their home games at the state-owned Estádio da Cidadela.

The club is owned by and named after Mr. Norberto de Castro, the owner of a namesake sports compound and youth football academy in Viana, Luanda.

== Achievements ==
- Angolan League: 0

- Angolan Cup: 0

- Angolan SuperCup: 0

- Gira Angola: 0

== Manager history ==
| (Angola) Carlos Azulinho | (2014) | - |

== See also ==
- Girabola
