= Académica Petróleos do Lobito =

Angolan football club

Académica do Lobito
- Full name: Académica Petróleos do Lobito
- Nickname: Os Estudantes
- Founded: 17 March 1970; 56 years ago
- Ground: Estádio do Buraco; Lobito, Angola
- Capacity: 3,000
- Chairman: Luís Gonçalo Borges
- Manager: Águas da Silva
- League: First Division
- 2025–26: 12th
Home colours	Away colours

Académica Petróleos do Lobito, usually known as Académica Lobito, are a football (soccer) club from Lobito, Angola. The club was founded in 1970 as Académica da Chilimba by Mr. Geraldo Guiado and a few associates. In 1981, a sponsorship deal with Angolan state-owned oil company Sonangol resulted in the club's name being changed to the current designation.

They are competing in 2025 in the Girabola. They play their home games at Estádio do Buraco.

== Achievements ==
- Angolan 2nd Division: 1

2014

== Recent seasons ==
Académica do Lobito's season-by-season performance since 2011:

Overall match statistics
Season	Pld	W	D	L	GF	GA	GD	%
2016	33	11	7	15	27	41	−14	0.561
2015	31	9	6	16	36	39	−3	0.548

Classifications
LG	AC	SC	CL	CC
12th	QF			
13th	PR			

Top season scorers
Player	LG	AC	SC	CL	CC	T
Rúben	6	?				6
Jacek	10	?				10

- PR = Preliminary round, 1R = First round, GS = Group stage, R32 = Round of 32, R16 = Round of 16, QF = Quarter-finals, SF = Semi-finals

== Players and staff ==
=== Staff ===
Name	Nat	Pos
Technical staff
Águas da Silva	(Angola)	Head coach
Ernesto Cotel	(Angola)	Assistant coach
Carlos Sambaca	(Angola)	Goal-keeper coach
Medical
Isaac Muajambi	(Angola)	Physician
Rui Garcia	(Angola)	Physio
Victor Bocoto	(Angola)	Masseur
Management
Luís Gonçalo Borges	(Angola)	Chairman

== Manager history ==
Season	Coach	Coach	Coach
1979	(Angola) Paím		
1980	(Angola) Rafael Garrocho		
1981	(Angola) Chico Santana	(Angola) Chiby	(Portugal) Vítor Gonçalves
1982	(Portugal) Vitor Gonçalves		
1983	(Angola) Chiby	(Argentina) Ruben Garcia	
1991	(Democratic Republic of the Congo) Kidumo Pedro		
1992
1993
1994
1995	(Angola) Nando Jordão		
1996
1997	(Angola) Arnaldo Chaves		
1998	(Angola) Carlos Queirós		
1999	(Angola) Carlos Queirós		
2000	(Angola) Carlos Queirós		
2001	(Angola) João Machado		
2002	(Angola) João Machado		

Season	Coach	Coach	Coach	Coach
2003	(Angola) Nando Jordão			
2004	(Angola) Nando Jordão	(Angola) Henriques Fernandes	(Angola) Albano César	
2005	(Angola) Albano César			
2006
2007
2008	(Angola) António Lopes Chiby	(Angola) João Pintar		
2009	(Angola) Rui Teixeira	(Angola) Agostinho Tramagal		
2010	(Angola) Agostinho Tramagal			
2011	(Angola) Daniel Quinhentos	(Angola) José Rocha	(Angola) José Silvestre Pelé	(Angola) César Caná
2012	(Angola) José Silvestre Pelé			
2013	(Angola) Agostinho Tramagal			
2014	(Turkey) Ekrem Asma			
2015	(Turkey) Ekrem Asma			
2016	(Portugal) Vaz Pinto	(Angola) António Lopes Chiby		
2017	(Angola) António Alegre	(Angola) José Silvestre Pelé		
2018	(Angola) Rui Garcia			
2018–19	(Angola) Paulino Júnior			
2019–20	(Angola) Águas Zeca da Silva			

== See also ==
- Girabola (2016)
- Gira Angola
