= Porcelana Futebol Clube do Cazengo =

Angolan sports club

Porcelana F.C.
- Full name: Porcelana Futebol Clube do Cazengo
- Ground: Estádio Municipal Santos Dinis; Ndalatando, Angola
- Capacity: 5,000
- Chairman: n/a
- Manager: n/a
- League: Gira Angola
- 2015: 1st (Série A)
Home colours	Away colours

== Introduction ==
Porcelana Futebol Clube do Cazengo is an Angolan sports club from the city of Ndalatando, in the northern province of Kwanza Norte.

The club was registered with the Angolan Football Federation in October 2009.

Eighteen years after the province's last representative – EKA do Dondo – was relegated, Porcelana was promoted to Angola's premier football league, the Girabola.

== Achievements ==
- Angolan League: 0

- Angolan Cup: 0

- Angolan Super Cup: 0

- Angolan 2nd Division: 1

2012

- Cuanza Norte provincial championship: 1

2015

== Recent seasons ==
Porcelana FC's season-by-season performance since 2011:

Overall match statistics
Season	Pld	W	D	L	GF	GA	GD	%
2016	30	5	3	22	14	48	–34	0.533
2015	17	11	4	2	7	7	0	0.706

Classifications
L3	L2	L1	AC	SC
		16th	DNP	
1st	1a		R16	

Top season scorers
Player	L3	L2	L1	AC	SC	T
three players			3	–	–	3
?	?	?		0		?

- PR = Preliminary round, 1R = First round, GS = Group stage, R32 = Round of 32, R16 = Round of 16, QF = Quarter-finals, SF = Semi-finals

== Staff ==
Name	Nat	Pos
Technical staff
—	(Angola)	Head coach
—	(Angola)	Assistant coach
Medical
—	(Angola)	Physio
Management
—	(Angola)	Chairman
—	(Angola)	Vice-chairman

== Manager history ==
(Angola) Finda Mozer	(2009)	–
(Angola) Castro João Domingos	(2011)	–
(Angola) Finda Mozer	(2013)	–
(Angola) Osvaldo Roque Joni	(Jan 2014)	–	(Nov 2014)
(Angola) Sarmento Seke	(Jan 2015)	–	(Dec 2015)
(Brazil) Luís Mariano	(Jan 2016)	–	(Jun 2016)
(Angola) Sarmento Seke	(Jun 2016)	–

== See also ==
- Girabola (2016)
- Gira Angola
