= Estrela Clube Primeiro de Maio =

Angolan football club

Primeiro de Maio
- Full name: Estrela Clube Primeiro de Maio
- Nickname: Os Proletários
- Founded: 1 April 1981; 45 years ago
- Ground: Estádio Municipal Edelfride Palhares da Costa; Benguela, Angola
- Capacity: 6,000
- Chairman: António Moisés
- Manager: Águas da Silva
- League: Girabola
- Website: http://carloskioko.wix.com/ec1omaiobenguela#!home/mainPage
Home colours	Away colours

Estrela Clube Primeiro de Maio, usually known simply as Primeiro de Maio or 1º de Maio, is a football (soccer) club from Benguela, Angola. The club was the result of a merger from two clubs: Estrela Vermelha de Benguela and Grupo Desportivo 1º de Maio being then named África Têxtil 1º de Maio de Benguela due to its then major sponsor, a Benguela-based textile factory called África Têxtil. Shortly afterwards, the name was changed to its present denomination. In its golden years, in the 1980s, the club has won two Angolan leagues (1983 and 1985), three Angolan cups (1982, 1983 and 2007) and one Angolan supercup (1985). Moreover, Primeiro de Maio became in 1994, the first Angolan club to reach the final of a CAF competition and to win the Angola Cup and the Angola Super Cup.

== Crest history ==
Second logo

Present logo

== Titles ==
- Angolan League: 2

1983, 1985

- Angola Cup: 3

1982, 1983, 2007

- Angolan SuperCup: 1

1985

- Angolan 2nd Division: 1

2015

== Recent seasons ==
EC Primeiro de Maio's season-by-season performance since 2011:

Overall match statistics
Season	Pld	W	D	L	GF	GA	GD	%
2016	31	7	8	16	24	45	–21	0.387
2015	9	8	0	1	12	3	+9	0.944

Classifications
L3	L2	L1	AC	SC	CL	CC
		15th	PR			
2nd	1b		PR			

Top season scorers
Player	L3	L2	L1	AC	SC	CL	CC	T
Filipe			6	0				6
?	?	?		?				?

- PR = Preliminary round, 1R = First round, GS = Group stage, R32 = Round of 32, R16 = Round of 16, QF = Quarter-finals, SF = Semi-finals

== Performance in CAF competitions ==
- African Cup of Champions Clubs: 2 appearances

1984: Second Round
1986: First Round

- CAF Confederation Cup: 1 appearance

2008 – First Round

- CAF Cup: 2 appearances

1994 – Finalist
1995 – Second Round

- CAF Cup Winners' Cup: 1 appearance

1983 – First Round

== Players and staff ==
=== Staff ===
Name	Nat	Pos
Technical staff
TBA	(Angola)	Head coach
TBA	(Angola)	Assistant coach
	(Angola)	Goalkeeper coach
Medical
	(Angola)	Physician
	(Angola)	Physio
	(Angola)	Team manager
Management
António Moisés	(Angola)	Chairman
	(Angola)	Managing Director
	(Angola)	Head of Foot Dept

== Manager history and performance ==
Season	Coach	S	L2	L1	C	Coach	L2	L1	C	Coach	L2	L1	C
1981	(Portugal) Emílio Ventura					(Argentina) Rúben Garcia							
1982	(Portugal) Emílio Ventura				1982 Angola Cup								
1983	(Argentina) Rúben Garcia †					(Socialist Federal Republic of Yugoslavia) Petar Kzernević		1983 Girabola	1983 Angola Cup				
1984	(Angola) João Machado												
1985	(Mozambique) Rui Rodrigues †	1985 Angola Super Cup		1985 Girabola									
1986	(Mozambique) Rui Rodrigues †					(Portugal) Emílio Ventura			RU				
1988	(Angola) Nando Jordão												
1989	(Angola) Nando Jordão												
1990	(Angola) Nando Jordão					(Argentina) Rúben Garcia							
1991	(Argentina) Rúben Garcia					(Angola) Pinto Leite							
1992	(Socialist Federal Republic of Yugoslavia) Abdulah Gegić †												
1993	(Angola) Nando Jordão												
1994	(Angola) Rui Teixeira												
1995	(Angola) José Rocha												
1996	(Angola) Fusso Nkosi				RU								
2000	(Angola) Pinto Leite		1st										
2001	(Angola) Pinto Leite					(Angola) Fusso Nkosi				(Angola) Nando Jordão		14th	
2002	(Angola) Nando Jordão		1st										
2003	(Angola) João Melanchton			10th									
2004	(Angola) João Melanchton					(Angola) Napoleão Brandão				(Angola) Fusso Nkosi		8th	
2005	(Angola) Agostinho Tramagal		6th										
2006	(Angola) Albano César		10th										
2007	(Angola) Fusso Nkosi					(Angola) Rui Teixeira		9th	2007 Angola Cup				
2008	(Angola) Rui Teixeira					(Angola) José Luís Borges		6th	SF				
2009	(Angola) João Gonçalves					(Angola) José Luís Borges			R16	(Angola) Fusso Nkosi		9th	
2011	(Angola) Francisco Paulino					(Angola) Fusso Nkosi		15th	SF				
2012	(Angola) Paulino Júnior					(Portugal) Álvaro Magalhães	1st		DNP				
2013	(Angola) Eddie Cardoso					(Angola) Paulino Júnior		13th	PR				
2014	(Angola) Paulo Saraiva					(Angola) Agostinho Tramagal		14th	PR				
2015	(Angola) Finda Mozer		1st		PR								
2016	(Angola) Finda Mozer					(Angola) Nzuzi André				(Angola) Hélder Teixeira		15th	PR
2017	(Angola) Hélder Teixeira					(Angola) Agostinho Tramagal							
2018	(Angola) Agostinho Tramagal												
2018-19	(Angola) Águas Zeca da Silva												
2019-20	(Angola) Paulino Júnior					(Angola) Yamba Asha							

- PR = Preliminary round, 1R = First round, GS = Group stage, R32 = Round of 32, R16 = Round of 16, QF = Quarter-finals, SF = Semi-finals, RU = Runner-Up, W = Winner

== See also ==
- Girabola (2016)
- Gira Angola
