= Polivalentes Luanda =

Angolan football club

Polivalentes FC
- Full name: Polivalentes Futebol Clube
- Ground: Estádio dos Coqueiros; Luanda, Angola
- Capacity: ?
- Chairman: Manuel Caleia
- Manager: Frederico Kiangebeni
- League: 2nd Division
- 2015: 4th (Série A)
Home colours

Polivalentes Futebol Clube is an Angolan football club based in the Palanca neighborhood in Kilamba Kiaxi, Luanda. They currently play in Gira Angola the Angolan Second Division.

== Stadium ==
Currently the team plays at the Estádio dos Coqueiros.

== Honours ==
- 28 de Agosto cup: 2013

== Manager history ==
(Angola) José Hilário	(2013)
(Angola) Joaquim da Costa	(2014)
(Angola) Frederico Kiangebeni	(2015)

== See also ==
- Girabola
