= Uíge =

Provincial capital in Angola

Uíge Wizidi Carmona
- Municipality and town
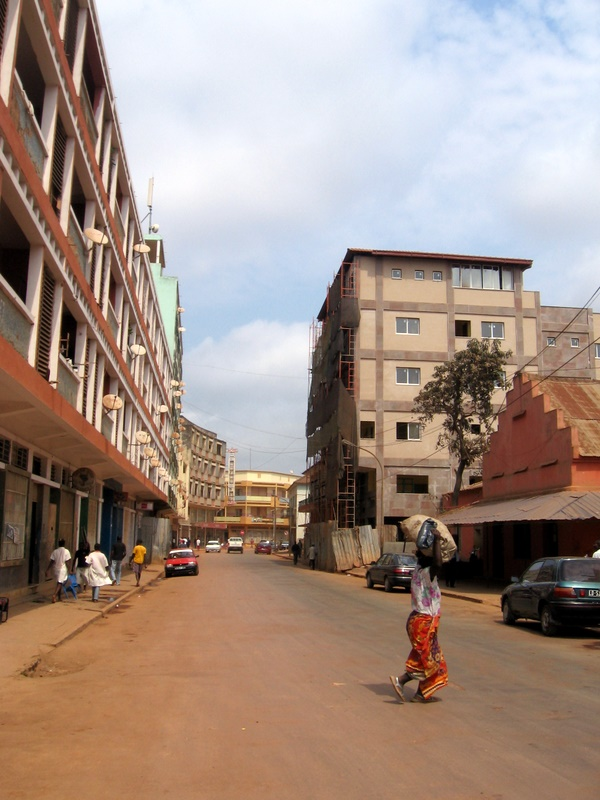
- Main street in Uíge

- Location in Angola
- Coordinates: 7°37′S 15°03′E
- Country: Angola
- Province: Uíge Province
- Founded: 1946

Area
  - Total: 1,188 km^{2} (459 sq mi)
- Elevation: 858 m (2,815 ft)

Population (2024)
  - Total: 773,099
  - Density: 650.8/km^{2} (1,685/sq mi)
- Time zone: UTC+1 (WAT)
- Climate: Aw

Uíge (Kongo: Wizidi or Wizi), formerly Carmona, is a provincial capital city in northwestern Angola, with a population of 636,253 (2024 census), and a municipality, with a population of 773,099 (2024 census), located in the province of the same name. It grew from a small market centre in 1945 to become a city in 1956. It is served by the Uíge Airport with daily flights to Luanda.

== Name ==
Uíge was renamed Vila Marechal Carmona in 1955 after the former Portuguese President Óscar Carmona, renamed simply Carmona after it became a city. The name was changed back to Uíge after independence in 1975.

== History ==
During Portuguese rule it became a major centre for coffee production in the 1950s. The city was the nerve centre of rebel activity against Portuguese occupation. Consequently, the city endured frequent guerrilla war between Portuguese forces and the National Front for the Liberation of Angola (Frente Nacional de Libertação de Angola; FNLA).

It had the worst known ever outbreak of the Marburg virus in 2005.

On February 10, 2017, there was a stampede at the 4 January Stadium in Uige, Angola. The incident caused the deaths of 17 people and injured 58 others.

== Demographics ==
In 2010 it had a population of 119,815. In 2014 the population was 322,531. Projected to be the fourth fastest growing city on the African continent between 2020 and 2025, with a 5.92% growth.
