= List of Kabuscorp S.C.P. players =

Kabuscorp Sport Clube do Palanca is an Angolan football (soccer) club based in Luanda, Angola and plays at Estádio dos Coqueiros. The club was established in 1994.

== 2011–2019 ==
Kabuscorp S.C.P. players 2011–2019

Nat	#	Nick	Name	A	P	Bondarenko		E.A.	Z.M.	M.G.	R. Filemón			R. Filemón			Kosta Papić			Paulo Torres			M.C.
Nat	#	Nick	Name	A	P	2011	2012	2013	2014	2015	2016 (5th)			2017 (4th)			2018 (9th)			2018–19 (4th)			20-21
Nat	#	Nick	Name	A	P	2	4	1	2	4	^{#}	^{A}	^{G}	^{#}	^{A}	^{G}	^{#}	^{A}	^{G}	^{#}	^{A}	^{G}	^{#}
(Angola)		Abel Manfuila	Abel Manfuila	25	MF	17	25	25	25	→													
(Cameroon)		Abianda	Yann Junior Abianda	22	FW						30	^{1(1)}	^{0}										
(Angola)		Abulá	José Bayoka	26	GK	12	12	12	12														
(Angola)		Adawa	Adawá Mokanga	29	MF		→	27	27	→													
(Democratic Republic of the Congo)		Agoya	Augusto Makanja	23	FW		23																
(Angola)		Água Doce	José Fernandes Mbuta	25	MF												→			24	^{20(5)}	^{1}	
(Angola)		Amarildo	Amarildo Eugénio Augusto Miranda	26	MF				→	11	11	^{(4)}	^{0}										
(Angola)		Amaro	Amândio Manuel Filipe da Costa	33	MF						→			18	^{20(2)}	^{4}	18	^{(13)}	^{0}	18	^{13(6)}	^{3}	
(Cameroon)		Arouna	Arouna Dang À Bissene	25	FW									→			9	^{6(4)}	^{4}				
(Angola)		Balacai	Evaristo Maurício Pascoal	24	MF												→			20	^{9(5)}	^{0}	
(Angola)		Bena	Diveluca Simão Nascimento	34	FW									→			15	^{1}	^{0}				
(Democratic Republic of the Congo)		Biscotte	Mbala Mbuta Biscotte	28	FW			7															
(Democratic Republic of the Congo)		Bobó	Beaudrick Muselenge Ungenda	27	DF					3	3	^{26}	^{1}	→									
(Angola)		Boka	Boka Nelson Filho	28	DF				→	2	→												
(Democratic Republic of the Congo)		Bokungu	Fiston Bokungu Ndjoli	26	FW		27																
(Angola)		Borges	Cláudio Ricardo Cunha Borges	32	DF	→	19	→	→	25	→												
(Angola)		Breco	Pedro dos Santos António	29	MF	→	21	20	20	→													
(Angola)		Bruno Batista	Bruno Miguel Francisco Batista	24	FW						7	^{3(8)}	^{1}	→									
(Angola)		Bruno Mpulu	Adilson Bruno Mpulu	24	DF									→			2	^{DNP}		→			
(Angola)		Buco	Simão Costa Bartolomeu					–															
(Angola)		Buzin	João Paulo Ikobino	25	DF	15	15																
(Angola)		Cabibi Ramos	Leonardo Manuel Isola Ramos	27	MF												→			11	^{4(1)}	^{1}	
(Argentina)		Calero	Franco Néstor Calero	29	FW									→			30	^{8(12)}	^{7}	→			
(Democratic Republic of the Congo)		Carlos Fuila	Carlos Nzuzi Fuila	30	DF									→			16	^{(4)}	^{0}				
(Angola)		Cassinda	Carlos Cassinda Gresmão	25	MF						→			8	^{(2)}	^{0}	→						
(Angola)		Celson Barros	Celson João Barros Costa	33	MF												→			6	^{13(1)}	^{0}	
(Angola)		Chico Caputo	Francisco Eduardo Gomes Caputo	32	FW						17	^{7(1)}	^{1}	17	^{8(9)}	^{0}							
(Angola)		Chole	Belchior Nejó Manhinhita José	26	FW					→	9	^{9(5)}	^{2}	→									
(Angola)		Chora Ginga	Fernando Quitanda Ginga	26	DF	→	–	23	→														
(Democratic Republic of the Congo)		Coco			DF									30	^{5}	^{0}							
(Angola)		Cristiano			MF						→			25	^{(3)}	^{0}	25	^{3(2)}	^{0}				
(Angola)		Dadão Pedro	Manuel Nzagi Pedro	27	GK												→			1	^{4}	^{0}	
(Rwanda)		Daddy	Etekiama Agiti Tady	33	FW												→			9	^{31}	^{9}	
(Angola)		Dany Satonho	Silas Daniel Satonho	29	MF															25	^{14(1)}	^{2}	
(Angola)		Dany Sebastião	Daniel Sebastião		MF			–	→														
(Angola)		Dário	Dário de Sousa Borges Cardoso	36	MF									→			8	^{17(6)}	^{0}	→			
(Democratic Republic of the Congo)		Dax Kiakanda	Dadi Kitondo Kiakanda	29	MF	–	10	10	10	10	11	^{5}	^{0}										
(Angola)		Debele	Edgar Elias Hebo Kissanga	30	DF						→			4	^{10}	^{0}	4	^{8}	^{0}	→			
(Angola)		Depaiza	Estevão Manuel Quitocota Cahoco	28	DF									→			17	^{12(2)}	^{1}	17	^{8(2)}	^{0}	
(Angola)		Didí Capemba	Edgar Alberto Capemba	25	FW			→	18														
(Angola)	19	Dilman	Dilman Edvair Furtado Ribeiro	25	FW												→			19	^{(4)}	^{0}	
(Angola)		Djemba	Afonso Marcos Kiala	25	MF	19	→																
(Angola)		Domingos Gomes	Domingos Manuel Gomes	21	FW						30	^{2(2)}	^{1}										
(Democratic Republic of the Congo)		Dr. Lami	Lami Yakini Thili	37	MF	13	13	13	13	13	13	^{23(1)}	^{1}	13	^{33(1)}	^{10}	13	^{20(4)}	^{3}	13	^{30(1)}	^{3}	
(Democratic Republic of the Congo)		Ebunga	Patou Saoule Ebunga-Simbi	36	DF						→			29	^{32(1)}	^{2}	29	^{22}	^{2}	29	^{31}	^{4}	
(Angola)		Elber	Jorge Mota Faial Delgado	27	GK						→			1	^{19}	^{0}	1	^{14}	^{0}	→			
(Angola)		Élio	Élio Wilson Costa Martins	28	MF				5	5	→												
(Angola)		Emilson	Aires Emilson Gonzaga Zeca	21	DF						23	^{DNP}					6	^{7}	^{0}				
(Angola)		Estória	Sérgio António Luís	26	DF						28	^{6}	^{0}	→									
(Angola)		Evandro	Evandro Elmer de Carvalho Brandão	25	MF					28	29	^{2}	^{0}										
(Angola)		Fabrício Mafuta	Fabrício Mafuta	31	DF												→			15	^{32}	^{2}	
(Angola)		Faustino Gonçalves	Faustino Jorge Gonçalves	23	DF					24	24	^{16}	^{0}	24	^{3(3)}	^{0}	24	^{1(1)}	^{0}				
(Angola)		Filhão	João Gomes de Oliveira	23	FW									→			26	^{20(2)}	^{3}	→			
(Portugal)		Firmino	Hugo Filipe Pinto Servulo Firmino	27	DF			→	17	17													
(Angola)		Fiston	Jorge Manito Mangani	31	DF	16	16	16	16	16	16	^{6(4)}	^{1}										
(Angola)		Fuky	Manuel Paulo David	24	MF					17	17	^{(5)}	^{0}										
(Angola)		Fundo †	Fundo Martins Mikule	22	FW					6	26	^{11(10)}	^{4}	26	^{1(11)}	^{1}	→						
(Angola)		Gui Cungulo	Eufrânio Carlos da Silva Cungulo	22	FW									→			5	^{5(9)}	^{0}	→			
(Angola)		Guilherme Afonso	Guilherme Garcia Afonso	30	FW					29	→												
(Angola)		Hernâni	Hernâni das Neves Tomás	35	DF			6	6														
(Angola)		Hugo Marques	Hugo Miguel Barreto Henriques Marques	29	GK	1	1		→	1	→												
(Democratic Republic of the Congo)		Ikuma	Ikuma Elenga Gilda	24	DF				–														
(Democratic Republic of the Congo)		Issama	Djo Issama Mpeko	26	DF			→	15	15													
(Democratic Republic of the Congo)		Jacques Bitumba	Jacques Bakulu Bitumba	24	FW						→			9	^{31}	^{10}	→						
(Portugal)		Jaime Poulson	Jaime Filipe Machado Poulson	26	FW				→	9	→												
(Angola)		Joaquim Adão	Joaquim Adão Lungieki João	23	MF				→	6													
(Angola)		Josué	João Eduardo Bunga	19	GK						12	^{1}	^{0}	12	^{2}	^{0}	12	^{6(1)}	^{0}	12	^{DNP}		
(Angola)		Jotabé Silva	João Baptista da Silva	32	GK									→			22	^{8}	^{0}	22	^{21}	^{0}	
(Democratic Republic of the Congo)		Kalobo	Ghislain Mukendi Kalobo	27	MF	8	8																
(Democratic Republic of the Congo)		Kanku Trésor	Kanku Madiata Trésor		FW						8	^{15(8)}	^{2}										
(Angola)		Kialunda	João Vienga Kialenda	28	DF			→	26	→													
(Angola)		Kibeixa	Pedro Victor Mingas	22	MF			19	19	19													
(Angola)		Kilamú	Cláudio Samuel Pedro	21	GK				21														
(Angola)		Kivuvu	Kisoka Jeadot Kivuvu	28	DF				→	3													
(Democratic Republic of the Congo)		Landu Makela	Landu Makela		DF		24	24															
(Angola)		Langanga	Landu Langanga	23	GK															1	^{6(1)}	^{0}	
(Angola)		Lelé Pengui	Fabiano Miguel Pengui	28	DF									→			28	^{3}	^{0}	→			
(Democratic Republic of the Congo)		Lelo Patrick	Lelo Mayimona Patrick	23	DF	2	2																
(Democratic Republic of the Congo)		Libengué Mukabidi	Fiston Kumbi Mukabidi	26	DF	3	3	3	3														
(Angola)		Líbero	Quintino Feliciano Pereira		DF						→			3	^{25(1)}	^{0}	3	^{24}	^{0}	→			
(Angola)		Lindala	Armando Domingos Maria		MF												→			26	^{3(3)}	^{0}	
(Angola)		Loló Cassule	Jorge Miguel Gonçalves Cassule	26	DF					→	2	^{5(2)}	^{0}	→									
(Angola)		Love Cabungula	Arsénio Sebastião Cabungula	35	FW			9	9														
(Angola)		Luís Tati	Luís Bumba Tati	25	MF						→			7	^{17(9)}	^{5}	→						
(Angola)	7	Lunguinha	António Luís dos Santos Serrado	33	DF	7	7	7	7	7	→			→			7	^{4}	^{0}	7	^{11(3)}	^{0}	
(Angola)		Lutumba			DF						–	^{1}	^{0}										
(Democratic Republic of the Congo)		Magola	Yves Magola Mapanda	34	MF					→	10	^{25(1)}	^{3}	10	^{32(1)}	^{1}	10	^{22(3)}	^{2}	10	^{25(4)}	^{1}	
(Angola)		Mano Calesso	Luís Calesso Ginga	27	MF				→	18	18	^{19(4)}	^{7}	→									
(Angola)		Manuel Gaspar	Manuel da Costa Gaspar	28	MF						→			5	^{23(4)}	^{0}							
(Angola)		Mário Hipólito	Mário Damião Hipólito	31	GK				→	21	21	^{19}	^{0}	→									
(Democratic Republic of the Congo)		Masasi	Masasi Obenza Amede		DF						15	^{2}	^{0}										
(Democratic Republic of the Congo)		Matampi	Vumi Ley Matampi	30	GK			→	1	→													
(Democratic Republic of the Congo)		Mavika	Mavika Lunzitisa		MF						→			30	^{3(2)}	^{0}							
(Angola)		Meda Nsiandamba	Vidal Miguel Paulo Nsiandamba	27	FW					27	27	^{25(1)}	^{1}	→						14	^{6(7)}	^{3}	
(Angola)		Mendinho Tavares	Walter Moura Mendes Tavares	28	MF						→			11	^{6(9)}	^{0}	→						
(Cameroon)		Meyong	Albert Meyong Zé	35	FW			30	30	30													
(Angola)		Milex	Lúvia João Mateus	28	MF	10	17	→															
(Angola)		Mingo Sanda	Domingos Fernando Sanda	35	DF					→	6	^{7(1)}	^{0}	6	^{2(1)}	^{0}							
(Democratic Republic of the Congo)		Mongo	Kipe Mongo Lompala Bokamba	24	FW						→			15	^{29(3)}	^{7}	→						
(Democratic Republic of the Congo)		Mpele Mpele	Daniel Mabata	30	MF	14	14	14	14	14	14	^{5(10)}	^{0}										
(Angola)		Mussumari	Gamaliel Frederico Mussumari	27	MF						20	^{17(1)}	^{1}	20	^{29(1)}	^{0}	20	^{20(1)}	^{3}	→			
(Angola)		Nandinho Macamo	Wilson Fernandes Augusto Macamo	33	MF									→			11	^{21(4)}	^{3}	→			
(Angola)		Nandinho Quissanga	Fernando Jacinto Quissanga	18	DF						25	^{4}	^{0}	→									
(Angola)		Nani	Sebastião Quionga Luvualo		DF												→			2	^{1}	^{0}	
(Angola)		Nari	Bráulio Adélio de Olim Diniz	31	MF						19	^{10(4)}	^{1}	19	^{28}	^{1}	19	^{23}	^{2}	→			
(Angola)		Ndó	António Nenuele Nelo	26	FW		18																
(Angola)		Nelito Tavares	Nelione José Tavares	31	FW						→			27	^{5(20)}	^{6}	27	^{22(5)}	^{10}	27	^{2(4)}	^{0}	
(Angola)		Nuno Cadete	Gerson Agostinho Sebastião Cadete	30	GK		→	1	→														
(Angola)		Nuno Neto	Nuno Miguel de Menezes Neto	31	DF			→	23	→													
(Angola)		Oliveira Velez	Sebastião Oliveira Velez	27	DF	4	4																
(Angola)		Panilson	Feliciano Felisberto Javela	26	DF				→	20	→												
(Democratic Republic of the Congo)		Papi	Isaac Maioca Caracato	26	DF			–															
(Angola)		Pataca	Bernardo Fernando Pataca da Silva	26	DF	26	6	→			15	^{2}	^{1}	→									
(Angola)		Patrick Anfumu	Patrick Lembo Anfunu	29	FW				→	23	→												
(Angola)		Paulito Gonga	Paulo Valentim Ucuahamba Gonga		MF												→			5	^{3(5)}	^{3}	
(Angola)		Paulo Alves	Paulo Alexandre Sousa Alves	22	FW				→	27													
(Angola)	21	Prince	Ntoya Matondo Paulo	23	GK												→			21	^{1}	^{0}	
(Angola)	23	Rafa Bravo	Paulo Kiela Pereira Bravo	19	DF									23	^{2}	^{0}	23	^{6(2)}	^{1}	23	^{10}	^{0}	
(Angola)		Riquinho	Henrique Agostinho Morais Sebastião	30	DF	5	→																
(Brazil)		Rivaldo	Rivaldo Vítor Borba Ferreira	40	MF		9																
(Angola)		Rodrigo	Rodrigo Kiala Manuel	23	FW	–	→																
(Angola)		Rúbia	Bernardo José Mulombo	27	GK	22	22	22	22	22	22	^{7}	^{0}	22	^{14}	^{0}							
(Democratic Republic of the Congo)		Saki	Saki Ndaka Amisi	28	FW		→	2	2	→													
(Angola)		Sawú	Sawu Diamanza Garcia Simão	28	FW	20	20																
(Democratic Republic of the Congo)		Seleó	Fiston Mudipanu	26	MF	21	11	11	11														
(Angola)		Silva Cussanda	Domingos Silvano Cussanda	32	DF			4	4	4	4	^{16(1)}	^{0}	→									
(Angola)		Simão Veya	Rosalino Baleiro Veya	28	DF												→			4	^{23(2)}	^{2}	
(Angola)		Sutsa	Pedro Omana Sutsa		MF	–	→																
(Angola)		Tobias Domingos	Bartolomeu de Sousa Domingos		MF						→			2	^{5(5)}	^{0}	→						
(Angola)		Tombé	David António Kivuma		MF									→			14	^{5(5)}	^{1}				
(Angola)	8	Tresor Sousa	Tresor Stanislau de Sousa	26	MF															8	^{9}	^{0}	
(Democratic Republic of the Congo)		Trésor Mputu	Trésor Mputu Mabi	30	MF			→	8	8				→									
(Democratic Republic of the Congo)		Tshukuma	Mboyo Itoko Jean Claude	28	DF	→	5	→															
(Cape Verde)		Vally	Valdevindes Chantres Monteiro	31	DF												→			3	^{15(2)}	^{1}	
(Portugal)		Wilson Gaspar	Wilson Pinto Gaspar	24	MF			→	29	→													
(Angola)	16	Yuri																		16	^{(6)}	^{0}	
(Angola)	28	Zebedeu	Zebedeu Jordão S. Morais	31	DF												→			28	^{4}	^{0}	
(Angola)		Zinho Francisco	Agostinho Politano Francisco		MF	–	→																
(Angola)	6	Zizí	Isidro de Oliveira André Manuel	23	MF															6	^{1(1)}	^{0}	
(Angola)		Zuela	Francisco Zuela dos Santos	31	DF				28	→													
Years						2011	2012	2013	2014	2015	2016			2017			2018			2019		35	20-21

== 2004–2010 ==
Kabuscorp S.C.P. players 2004–2010

Nat	Nick	Name	A	P	–	A.K.	–	K.N.	K.P.	D.D.	D.S.	
Nat	Nick	Name	A	P	2004	2005	2006	2007	2008	2009	2010	
Nat	Nick	Name	A	P	–	–	–	–	8	12	8	
(Angola)	Abel Dora	Abel Mudilo Dora		DF					2008	2009		
(Democratic Republic of the Congo)	Adolph Mabana	Adolph Boto Mabana		FW					2008	2009		
(Angola)	Agugú	Agostinho Paciência	21	FW				→	2008	2009	→	
(Angola)	Basílio Aleca	Basílio Mbando Aleca		GK				→	2008			
(Angola)	Beck			MF		2005	2006					
(Angola)	Beton			MF				2007	2008	2009		
(Angola)	Buá	Luvumbo Lourenço Pedro	22	MF						→	–	→
(Angola)	Buzin	João Paulo Ikobino	–	DF							15	↑
(Democratic Republic of the Congo)	Dady Nseye	Kongolo Lusala Makiese Nseye		MF		2005		2007	2008	2009	–	
(Angola)	Dauda					2005						
(Angola)	Diangani	Mateus Diangani	29	DF				→	2008	2009	→	
(Angola)	Didí Pululu	Emanuel António Pululu		MF				2007	2008	2009		
(Angola)	Djemba Kiala	Afonso Marcos Kiala	–	MF						→	19	↑
(Democratic Republic of the Congo)	Dr. Lami	Lami Yakini Thili	–	MF						2009	13	↑
(Angola)	Eduardo Pedro	Eduardo Pereira Pedro	23	DF					→	2009		
(Angola)	Fiston Mangani	Jorge Manito Mangani	–	DF		2005		→	2008	2009	16	↑
(Angola)	Francisco			FW		2005		2007	2008			
(Angola)	Gaúcho							2007				
(Angola)	Goliath	Matumona Lundala	37	GK						2009		
(Zambia)	Harry Milanzi	Harry Milanzi	31	FW					→	2009		
(Angola)	Hugo										–	
(Zambia)	Ian Bakala	Ian Bakala	29	MF					→	2009		
(Gabon)	Ibrahim	Valère Ibrahim Bolafessa	27	GK						2009		
(Angola)	John			DF		2005		2007	2008			
(Democratic Republic of the Congo)	Kalobo	Ghislain Mukendi Kalobo	–	MF							8	↑
(Angola)	Kapessa							2007				
(Angola)	Katshu			GK		2005						
(Angola)	Kembua	Nkembo Garcia	18	FW		2005						
(Angola)	Koli					2005						
(Angola)	Lami, Paulo	Paulo Monteiro Lami	30						2008	2009	→	
(Democratic Republic of the Congo)	Lelo Patrick	Lelo Mayimona Patrick	–	DF							2	↑
(Democratic Republic of the Congo)	Lokwa	Lokwa Mbo Blanchard	22	GK						→	–	→
(Angola)	Lucas			GK					2008			
(Democratic Republic of the Congo)	Lukose	Lukose Mandika	30	DF						→	–	→
(Democratic Republic of the Congo)	Masiala	Masiala Nguvulu Samuel					→	2007	→			
(Angola)	Max					2005						
(Democratic Republic of the Congo)	Mbala	Kita Lucien Mbala	31	DF					2008			
(Democratic Republic of the Congo)	Mbiyavanga	Kapela Mbiyavanga	33	FW					2008	2009		
(Angola)	Micki	José Cambundo Mungongo	23	DF					2008	→		
(Angola)	Milex	Lúvia João Mateus	–	MF						→	10	↑
(Angola)	Mingo Ngola	Osvaldo António Ngunza Ngola	26	MF						2009		
(Democratic Republic of the Congo)	Mpele Mpele	Daniel Mabata	–	MF							14	↑
(Democratic Republic of the Congo)	Muamba	Muamba Mukala Patou		DF					2008	2009		
(Angola)	Mungusso	José Kadima Mungusso		FW					2008	→		
(Angola)	Ndombolo							2007	2008			
(Angola)	Papi							2007				
(Angola)	Papy Shumu	Papy Lukata Shumu	30	GK				→	2008	→		
(Angola)	Pataca	Bernardo Fernando Pataca da Silva	–	DF						→	26	↑
(Angola)	Pedulú	Paulo Gomes Gonçalves		MF					→	2009		
(Angola)	Pilola	José Olívio Andrade Pereira	25	FW						→	–	→
(Democratic Republic of the Congo)	Pitchu			FW				2007		2009	–	
(Democratic Republic of the Congo)	Raúl Koko	Raul Kidumu Koko		DF				→	2008	2009		
(Angola)	Riquinho Sebastião	Henrique Agostinho Morais Sebastião	–	DF				→	2008	2009	5	↑
(Angola)	Sengola					2005						
(Angola)	Sutsa	Pedro Omana Sutsa	–	MF							–	↑
(Democratic Republic of the Congo)	Toto	Toto Simon		DF					→	2009	–	
(Angola)	Vado Jorge	Osvaldo Fernando Jorge	21	MF				→	2008	→		
(Angola)	Weah							2007				
(Brazil)	William Guimarães	William da Silva Guimarães	29	FW							–	
(Angola)	Yano Abílio	Adriano Pedro António Abílio		FW					→	2009		
(Democratic Republic of the Congo)	Zamba Ngolu	Zamba Victor Ngolu		GK				2007	2008	2009	–	
(Angola)	Zé Loco					2005						
(Angola)	Zinho Francisco	Agostinho Politano Francisco	–	MF					2008	2009	–	↑
(Democratic Republic of the Congo)	Zola Nseka	Zola Nseka		MF				→	2008			
Years					2004	2005	2006	2007	2008	2009	2010	

== 1994–2000 ==
Kabuscorp S.C.P. players 1994–2000

Nat	Nick	Name	A	P					K.P.		
Nat	Nick	Name	A	P	1994	1995	1996	1997	1998	1999	2000
Nat	Nick	Name	A	P	–	–	–	–	–	–	–
(Angola)	Addy Buzaye								1998		
(Angola)	Baba								1998		
(Angola)	Beke								1998		
(Angola)	Blanchard								1998		
(Angola)	Janeiro								1998		
(Angola)	Jesus								1998		
(Angola)	Jorge								1998		
(Angola)	Kembua								1998		
(Angola)	Lokelo								1998		
(Angola)	Munganga								1998		
(Angola)	Muteba								1998		
(Angola)	Oliveira								1998		
(Angola)	Roque								1998		
(Angola)	Senda								1998		
(Angola)	Sousa								1998		

== See also ==
- Category:Kabuscorp S.C.P. players
