= 2018 Kabuscorp S.C.P. season =

Kabuscorp Sport Clube do Palanca
2018 season
- President: Bento Kangamba
- Manager: Sérgio Traguil (Dec 2017–Jun 2018); Kosta Papić (Jun 2018–)
- Stadium: Estádio dos Coqueiros
- Girabola: 9th
- Top goalscorer: League: Nelito (10); All: Nelito (10)
- Biggest win: Kabuscorp 5–0 Libolo (03 Mar 2018)
- Biggest defeat: Kabuscorp 0–5 D'Agosto (30 Jun 2018)
Home colours	Away colours
- All statistics correct as of 27 Jun 2018.

The 2018 season of Kabuscorp Sport Clube do Palanca is the club's 16th season in Angolan football and the 11th consecutive season in the Girabola, the top flight league of Angolan football. In 2018, the club participated in the Girabola.

== J.G.M. withdrawal ==
In late April, J.G.M. submitted a withdrawal request to the Angolan Football Federation citing financial reasons. The request was granted. As a result, 3 points won by Kabuscorp in its round 3 away match win against J.G.M. were withdrawn.

== FIFA penalties ==
FIFA has instructed the Angolan Football Federation that Kabuscorp should forfeit 6 points in the league as a result of being in default to their former star player Rivaldo. In a weekly report issued by the Angolan federation, it is further stated that the club may be banned from official competition in case the claimant files a new complaint.

In June, FIFA again ruled that Kabuscorp forfeits 6 points in the league for being in default with TP Mazembe in the 2014 deal with Trésor Mputu.

== Squad information ==
Alternative 1	Alternative 2

Goal-keeper 1	Goal-keeper 2

=== Players ===
No.	Nat	Nick	Name	Pos	Date of birth (age)
Goalkeepers
1	(Angola)	Elber	Jorge Mota Faial Delgado	–	24 June 1991 (aged 27)
22	(Angola)	Jotabé	João Baptista da Silva	–	30 October 1987 (aged 31)
Defenders
3	(Angola)	Libero	Quintino Feliciano Pereira	CB	–
4	(Angola)	Debele	Edgar Elias Hebo Kissanga	CB	14 August 1988 (aged 30)
7	(Angola)	Lunguinha	António Luís dos Santos Serrado	RB	16 January 1986 (aged 32)
16	(Democratic Republic of the Congo)	Carlos	Carlos Nzuzi Fuila	CB	0 December 1988 (aged 30)
17	(Angola)	Depaiza	Estevão Manuel Quitocota Cahoco	LB	22 February 1991 (aged 27)
19	(Angola)	Nari	Bráulio Adélio de Olim Diniz	RB	30 April 1987 (aged 31)
23	(Angola)	Rafa	Paulo Kiela Pereira Bravo	DF	11 September 2000 (aged 18)
29	(Democratic Republic of the Congo)	Ebunga	Patou Ebunga-Simbi	LB	26 August 1983 (aged 35)
Midfielders
6	(Angola)	Emilson	Aires Emilson Gonzaga Zeca	MF	–
8	(Angola)	Dário	Dário de Sousa Borges Cardoso	LW	25 June 1982 (aged 36)
10	(Democratic Republic of the Congo)	Magola	Yves Magola Mapanda	CM	10 October 1985 (aged 33)
11	(Angola)	Nandinho	Wilson Fernandes Augusto Macamo	RW	17 September 1985 (aged 33)
13	(Democratic Republic of the Congo)	Dr Lami	Lami Yakini Thili	LW	4 April 1982 (aged 36)
14	(Angola)	Tombé	David António Kivuma	MF	–
18	(Angola)	Amaro	Amândio Felipe da Costa	RW	12 November 1986 (aged 32)
20	(Angola)	Mussumari	Gabriel Frederico Mussumari	MF	17 December 1988 (aged 30)
25	(Angola)	Cristiano	–	MF	–
Forwards
5	(Angola)	Gui	Eufrânio Carlos da Silva Cungulo	FW	31 October 1996 (aged 22)
9	(Cameroon)	Arouna	Arouna Dang À Bissene	–	22 April 1993 (aged 25)
15	(Angola)	Bena	Diveluca Simão Nascimento	–	25 August 1984 (aged 34)
26	(Angola)	Filhão	João de Oliveira	–	14 June 1995 (aged 23)
27	(Angola)	Nelito	Nelione José Tavares	–	–
30	(Argentina)	Franco	Franco Néstor Calero	–	9 March 1989 (aged 29)

=== Pre-season transfers ===
No.	Nat	Nick	Name	Pos	Date of birth (age)	
Transfers out To
8	(Angola)	Cassinda	Carlos Cassinda Gresmão	MF	1 May 1992 (aged 26)	(Angola) Cuando Cubango FC
26	(Angola)	Fundo	Fundo Martins Mikule	FW	9 March 1995 (aged 23)	(Angola) Progresso Sambizanga
9	(Democratic Republic of the Congo)	Jacques	Jacques Bakulu Bitumba	FW	28 August 1993 (aged 25)	(Angola) Primeiro de Agosto
7	(Angola)	Luís Tati	Luís Bumba Tati	FW	–	(Angola) Sagrada Esperança
11	(Angola)	Mendinho	Walter Moura Mendes Tavares	LW	0 December 1989 (aged 29)	(Angola) Académica do Lobito
15	(Democratic Republic of the Congo)	Mongo	Kipe Mongo Lompala Bokamba	FW	22 August 1993 (aged 25)	(Angola) Primeiro de Agosto
2	(Angola)	Tobias	Bartolomeu de Sousa Domingos	DF	–	(Angola) Recreativo da Caála
Transfers in From
9	(Cameroon)	Arouna	Arouna Dang À Bissene	FW	22 April 1993 (aged 25)	(Argentina) Atlético Huracán
15	(Angola)	Bena	Diveluca Simão Nascimento	FW	25 August 1984 (aged 34)	(Angola) ASA
2	(Angola)	Bruno	Adilson Bruno Nfululu	DF	–	(Angola) Santa Rita de Cássia
30	(Argentina)	Calero	Franco Néstor Calero	FW	9 March 1989 (aged 29)	(Ecuador) S.D. Aucas
16	(Democratic Republic of the Congo)	Carlos	Carlos Nzuzi Fuila	CB	0 December 1988 (aged 30)	(Angola) Académica do Lobito
8	(Angola)	Dário	Dário de Sousa Borges Cardoso	LW	25 June 1982 (aged 36)	(Angola) Recreativo do Libolo
17	(Angola)	Depaiza	Estevão Manuel Quitocota Cahoco	LB	22 February 1991 (aged 27)	(Angola) Recreativo do Libolo
6	(Angola)	Edmilson	Aires Edmilson Gonzaga Zeca	DF	–	(Angola) Santa Rita de Cássia
26	(Angola)	Filhão	João de Oliveira	FW	14 June 1995 (aged 23)	(Angola) Recreativo da Caála
5	(Angola)	Gui	Eufrânio Carlos da Silva Cungulo	FW	31 October 1996 (aged 22)	(Angola) Primeiro de Agosto
22	(Angola)	Jotabé	João Baptista da Silva	GK	30 October 1987 (aged 31)	(Angola) Interclube
28	(Angola)	Lelé	Fabiano Miguel Peng	DF	2 August 1990 (aged 28)	(Angola) Recreativo da Caála
–	(Angola)	Lelo	José Lelo Sevo Barros	CB	5 April 1982 (aged 36)	(Angola) Bravos do Maquis
7	(Angola)	Lunguinha	António Luís dos Santos Serrado	CB	16 January 1986 (aged 32)	(Angola) Progresso Sambizanga
11	(Angola)	Nandinho	Wilson Fernandes Augusto Macamo	RW	17 September 1985 (aged 33)	(Angola) Recreativo do Libolo
14	(Angola)	Tombé	David António Kivuma	MF	–	(Angola) Recreativo da Caála

=== Mid-season transfers ===
No.	Nat	Nick	Name	Pos	Date of birth (age)	
Transfers out To
24	(Angola)	Faustino	Faustino Jorge Gonçalves	LB	30 March 1995 (aged 23)	(Angola) Rec do Libolo
Transfers in From

=== Staff ===
Nat	Name	Position(s)	Date of birth (age)	Remark
Technical staff
(Portugal)	Sérgio Traguil	Head coach	18 October 1980 (aged 38)	Released in midseason
(Serbia)	Kosta Papić	Head coach	17 July 1960 (aged 58)	Joined in midseason
(Angola)	Quim Manuel	Assistant coach	–	
(Angola)	Adriano Soares	Goalkeeper coach	–	
Medical
(Angola)	Caetano Maria	Physician	–	
(Angola)	Jorge de Almeida	Physio	–	
Management
(Angola)	Bento Kangamba	Chairman	6 July 1965 (aged 53)	
(Angola)	Domingos Jacinto	Vice-Chairman	–	

== Angolan League ==
=== League table ===
Pos	Team	Pld	W	D	L	GF	GA	GD	Pts
7	Sagrada Esperança	28	8	11	9	29	28	+1	35
8	Bravos do Maquis	28	9	7	12	23	27	−4	34
9	Kabuscorp (Note: Kabuscorp were deducted 12 points as a result of payment default.)	28	13	5	10	42	38	+4	32
10	Sporting de Cabinda	28	7	11	10	21	26	−5	32
11	Cuando Cubango FC	28	8	7	13	18	28	−10	31

Updated to match(es) played on 2 September 2018. Source: Girabola.com
Rules for classification: 1) Points; 2) Head-to-head points; 3) Head-to-head goal difference; 4) Goal difference; 5) Goals scored; 6) Fair-play points; 7) Play-off.

=== Results ===
==== Results summary ====
Overall								Home						Away					
Pld	W	D	L	GF	GA	GD	Pts	W	D	L	GF	GA	GD	W	D	L	GF	GA	GD
28	13	5	10	42	38	+4	44	9	2	3	29	18	+11	4	3	7	13	20	−7

Last updated: 29 August 2018.
Source: Girabola

==== Results by round ====
Round	1	2	3	4	5	6	7	8	9	10	11	12	13	14	15	16	17	18	19	20	21	22	23	24	25	26	27	28	29	30
Ground	A	H	A	H	A	H	A	H	A	H	A	H	A	H	A	H	A	H	A	H	A	H	A	H	A	H	A	H	A	H
Result	L	W		W	L	L	W	L	L	W	W	W	D	W	W	W	D		W	L	L	W	D	D	L	W	L	W	L	D
Position	11	13		15	15	15	15	15	15	15	13	11	11	7	6	9	10		9	10	11	10	9	10	10	10	10	8	8	9

Updated to match(es) played on 2 September 2018. Source: GirabolaZap
A = Away; H = Home; W = Win; D = Draw; L = Loss

==== Results overview ====
Win Draw Loss

Team	Home score	Away score
Recreativo da Caála	3–0	0-1
Sporting de Cabinda	3–0	2–2
J.G.M.		
Recreativo do Libolo	5–0	2–1
1º de Agosto	0-5	1-3
Petro de Luanda	0-3	0-1
Domant FC	2–1	2–1
Desportivo da Huíla	0-1	1–1
Interclube	1–1	0-2
Sagrada Esperança	2–0	0-1
Cuando Cubango FC	2–1	1–0
Progresso do Sambizanga	3–2	0-4
Primeiro de Maio	4–2	1–1
Bravos do Maquis	2–0	0-1
Académica do Lobito	2–2	3–1

=== Match details ===
Mon, 12 Feb 2018 01	Rec da Caála	0–1	Kabuscorp	Mártires da Canhala, Caála
16:00 WAT (UTC+1)	Careca 55'	Report		Referee: Bernardo Moreira; Adão Silva, Aldair Carmelino
Note: Elber / Debele, Faustino, Lunguinha (substituted off) 69', Nari / Dário, Dr.Lami (c), Emilson, Nandinho (substituted off) 87' / Bena (substituted off) 65', Nelito — Filhão (substituted on) 65', Mussumari (substituted on) 69', Amaro (substituted on) 87'

Fri, 16 Feb 2018 02	Kabuscorp	3–0	Sporting Cabinda	Coqueiros, Luanda
18:00 WAT (UTC+1)	Nelito 18', 35', 39'			Referee: Paulo Talaia; Ricardo Daniel, Joaquim Chiyo
Note: Elber / Debele, Depaiza, Libero, Mussumari / Dário (substituted off) 68', Dr.Lami (c), Nandinho (substituted off) 83', Nari / Filhão (substituted off) 86', Nelito — Amaro (substituted on) 68', Cristiano (substituted on) 83', Faustino (substituted on) 86'

Sat, 24 Feb 2018 03	J.G.M.	Annulled (originally 1–2)	Kabuscorp	Kurikutelas, Huambo
15:00 WAT (UTC+1)	Kibeixa 87'	Report	23' Nari; 73' Nelito	Referee: Nuno Eduardo; Manuel Benguela, Nilton Armando
Note: Elber / Debele, Depaiza, Libero, Mussumari / Dário (substituted off) 79', Dr.Lami (c), Nandinho, Nari / Filhão (substituted off) 54', Nelito (substituted off) 87' — Magola (substituted on) 54', Gui (substituted on) 79', Ebunga (substituted on) 87'

Sat, 03 Mar 2018 04	Kabuscorp	5–0	Rec do Libolo	Coqueiros, Luanda
17:30 WAT (UTC+1)	Nari 16'; Dr. Lami 51'; Arouna 67'; Magola 85'; Calero 88'	Report		Referee: António Dungula; Ricardo Daniel, Joaquim Chio
Note: Elber / Depaiza, Libero, Mussumari, Nari / Dário (substituted off) 73', Dr.Lami (c), Emilson, Nandinho / Filhão (substituted off) 63', Nelito (substituted off) 62' — Arouna (substituted on) 62', Magola (substituted on) 63', Calero (substituted on) 73'

Sun, 11 Mar 2018 05	1º de Agosto	3–1	Kabuscorp	11 de Novembro, Luanda
17:00 WAT (UTC+1)	Ibukun 29'; Fofó 55', 82'	Report	74' Arouna	Referee: João Goma; José Felix, Dário Gaspar
Note: Elber / Depaiza, Emilson, Libero, Mussumari / Dário (substituted off) 52', Dr.Lami (c), Nandinho, Nari (substituted off) 69' / Arouna, Filhão (substituted off) 79' — Calero (substituted on) 52', Magola (substituted on) 69', Nelito (substituted on) 79'

Sat, 17 Mar 2018 07	Domant FC	1–2	Kabuscorp	Municipal, Caxito
15:00 WAT (UTC+1)	Mabululu 34'	Report	38' Ebunga; 45+3' Arouna	Referee: Paulo Sérgio; Segunda Tchisseque, Lídio Coimbra
Note: Elber / Ebunga, Emilson, Lelé, Mussumari / Dr.Lami (c), Magola, Nandinho (substituted off) 80', Nari / Arouna (substituted off) 85', Calero (substituted off) 88' — Dário (substituted on) 80', Nelito (substituted on) 85', Gui (substituted on) 88'

Sat, 31 Mar 2018 08	Kabuscorp	0–1	Desportivo Huíla	Coqueiros, Luanda
17:30 WAT (UTC+1)			74' Lionel	Referee: Ailton Carmelino; Evanildo Martins, Ivanildo Lopes
Note: Elber / Ebunga, Emilson, Lelé, Lunguinha / Dr.Lami (c), Magola, Nandinho (substituted off) 76', Nari / Arouna (substituted off) 64', Filhão (substituted off) 46' — Calero (substituted on) 46', Nelito (substituted on) 64', Gui (substituted on) 76'

Sat, 07 Apr 2018 09	Interclube	2–0	Kabuscorp	22 de Junho, Luanda
16:00 WAT (UTC+1)	Mano 17'; Pedro 47'	Report		Referee: Hélder Martins; Evanildo Martins, Ivanildo Lopes
Note: Elber / De Paiza, Debele, Emilson, Lunguinha (substituted off) 69' / Dário (substituted off) 77', Dr.Lami (c), Nandinho, Nari / Calero (substituted off) 54', Nelito — Magola (substituted on) 54', Amaro (substituted on) 69', Gui (substituted on) 77'

Sun, 15 Apr 2018 10	Kabuscorp	2–0	Sagrada	Coqueiros, Luanda
17:30 WAT (UTC+1)	Nari 4'; Ebunga 24'	Report		Referee: Pedro dos Santos; Luís Mateus, Pedro Futa
Note: Elber / Ebunga, Libero, Mussumari (substituted off) 85', Nari (c) / Dário, Gui, Magola, Nandinho / Filhão (substituted off) 81', Nelito (substituted off) 71' — Arouna (substituted on) 71', Amaro (substituted on) 81', Rafa (substituted on) 85'

Sat, 21 Apr 2018 11	Cuando Cubango	0–1	Kabuscorp	Municipal, Menongue
15:00 WAT (UTC+1)		Report	61' Arouna	Referee: António Cachala; Júlio Lemos, Joaquim Rocha
Note: Elber / Ebunga, Libero, Mussumari, Nari (c) / Dário, Gui (substituted off) 52', Magola, Nandinho (substituted off) 89' / Filhão, Nelito (substituted off) 74' — Arouna (substituted on) 52', Carlos (substituted on) 74', Depaiza (substituted on) 89'

Wed, 25 Apr 2018 12	Kabuscorp	3–2	Progresso	Coqueiros, Luanda
16:00 WAT (UTC+1)	Nandinho 18'; Nelito 38'; Calero		40' Nandinho; Popó	Referee: Sabino de Carvalho; Celestino Golombole, Ladislau Miguel
Note: Elber / Ebunga, Libero, Mussumari, Nari (c) / Dário, Gui, Magola, Nandinho / Arouna (substituted off) , Filhão — Calero (substituted on) , Nelito (substituted on)

Sun, 29 Apr 2018 13	1º de Maio	1–1	Kabuscorp	Ombaka, Benguela
16:00 WAT (UTC+1)	Dilman 5'		90+6' Tombé	Referee: Mauro de Oliveira; Domingos Francisco, Nery Silva
Note: Elber / Ebunga, Emilson (substituted off) 79', Libero, Mussumari / Dário, Gui, Magola (c) (substituted off) 57', Nandinho / Filhão (substituted off) 73', Nelito — Calero (substituted on) 57', Tombé (substituted on) 73', Amaro (substituted on) 79'

Wed, 09 May 2018 14	Kabuscorp	2–0	Bravos Maquis	Coqueiros, Luanda
18:00 WAT (UTC+1)	Mussumari 56'; Filhão 83'	Report		Referee: José Chitumba; Rosário Calembela, Estanislau Guedes
Note: Elber / Depaiza (substituted off) 82', Ebunga, Libero, Mussumari / Magola, Nandinho (substituted off) 87', Nari (c) / Calero (substituted off) 77', Filhão, Nelito — Carlos (substituted on) 77', Dr.Lami (substituted on) 82', Gui (substituted on) 87'

Sun, 13 May 2018 15	Académica	1–3	Kabuscorp	Ombaka, Benguela
15:00 WAT (UTC+1)	Lelas 11'	Report	25' Nelito; 42' Magola; 90+2' Dr. Lami	Referee: Chitano Francisco; Jerson Emiliano, Rosário Calembe
Note: Elber / Depaiza, Ebunga, Libero, Mussumari / Magola, Nandinho (substituted off) 85', Nari (c) / Calero (substituted off) 84', Filhão (substituted off) 70', Nelito — Dr.Lami (substituted on) 70', Dário (substituted on) 84', Gui (substituted on) 85'

Sat, 19 May 2018 06	Kabuscorp	0–3	Petro Atlético	Coqueiros, Luanda
17:30 WAT (UTC+1)		Report	66' Maludi; 71', 90+1' Azulão	Referee: Pedro dos Santos; Júlio Lemos, Luís Mateus
Note: Elber / Depaiza, Ebunga (substituted off) 43', Libero, Mussumari / Magola, Nandinho, Nari (c) / Calero (substituted off) 89', Filhão, Nelito (substituted off) 63' — Gui (substituted on) 43', Dr.Lami (substituted on) 63', Tombé (substituted on) 89'

Fri, 08 Jun 2018 16	Kabuscorp	3–0	Rec da Caála	Coqueiros, Luanda
17:00 WAT (UTC+1)	Mussumari 19'; Calero 37'; Nandinho 45'			Referee: Carlos Silva; Manuel Lobe, Alberto Dumbi
Note: Jotabé / Ebunga, Libero, Mussumari, Nari / Dário, Dr.Lami (c), Magola, Nandinho (substituted off) 75' / Calero (substituted off) 76', Filhão (substituted off) 65' — Tombé (substituted on) 65', Amaro (substituted on) 75', Nelito (substituted on) 76'

Sat, 16 Jun 2018 17	Sporting Cabinda	2–2	Kabuscorp	Tafe, Cabinda
15:30 WAT (UTC+1)	Gláucio II 3'; Gláucio 36'		17' Nelito; 78' Mussumari	Referee: Sabino de Carvalho; Celestino Golombole, Ladislau Miguel
Note: Jotabé / Depaiza, Lelé, Libero, Mussumari / Dr.Lami (c), Magola, Nari, Tombé / Nandinho, Nelito (substituted off) — Filhão (substituted on) , Amaro (substituted on)

Sat, 23 Jun 2018 18	Kabuscorp	Cancelled	J.G.M.	Coqueiros, Luanda
16:00 WAT (UTC+1)

Wed, 27 Jun 2018 19	Rec do Libolo	1–2	Kabuscorp	Estádio Municipal, Calulo
15:00 WAT (UTC+1)	Magrão 80'		11', 90+2' Nelito	Referee: Paulo Talaia; Ricardo Daniel, Joaquim Chiyo
Note: Jotabé / Debele, Ebunga, Libero, Nari (substituted off) 47' / Dr.Lami (c), Magola, Nandinho, Tombé (substituted off) 63' / Arouna (substituted off) 73', Nelito — Rafa (substituted on) 47', Dário (substituted on) 63', Calero (substituted on) 73'

Sat, 30 Jun 2018 20	Kabuscorp	0–5	1º de Agosto	11 de Novembro, Luanda
17:00 WAT (UTC+1)		Report	22' Dani; 50' Mongo; 58' Geraldo; 83', 89' Jacques	Referee: Airton Carmelino; Evanildo Lopes, Ivanildo Martins
Note: Jotabé / Debele, Ebunga, Libero, Mussumari / Dr.Lami (c), Magola, Nandinho (substituted off) 77', Tombé (substituted off) 55' / Arouna (substituted off) 54', Nelito — Dário (substituted on) 54', Calero (substituted on) 55', Amaro (substituted on) 77'

Thu, 05 Jul 2018 21	Petro Atlético	1–0	Kabuscorp	11 de Novembro, Luanda
16:00 WAT (UTC+1)	Azulão 84'			Referee: João Goma; José Felix, Dário Gaspar
Note: Jotabé / Depaiza, Ebunga, Libero, Mussumari (substituted off) 67' / Dário, Dr.Lami (c), Magola, Nari / Nelito (substituted off) 83', Rafa — Nandinho (substituted on) 67', Arouna (substituted on) 83'

Mon, 09 Jul 2018 22	Kabuscorp	2–1	Domant FC	Coqueiros, Luanda
17:00 WAT (UTC+1)	Filhão 41'; Nandinho 67'		43' (pen.) Mabululu	Referee: Rodrigues Aleixo; Nicodemos Calembela, Francisco Paulo
Note: Jotabé / Debele, Ebunga, Libero, Mussumari / Dário (substituted off) , Dr.Lami (c), Magola / Filhão (substituted off) 83', Nelito, Rafa (substituted off) 63' — Nandinho (substituted on) , Calero (substituted on) 63', Gui (substituted on) 83'

Sat, 14 Jul 2018 23	Desportivo Huíla	1–1	Kabuscorp	Estádio do Ferrovia, Lubango
15:00 WAT (UTC+1)	Sidney 67'	Report	85' Calero	Referee: Benjamin Andrade; Judith Mestre, Bernabé Ngulo
Note: Jotabé / Debele, Ebunga, Libero, Mussumari (substituted off) 76' / Cristiano (substituted off) 46', Dário, Dr.Lami (c), Magola / Filhão (substituted off) 78', Nelito — Amaro (substituted on) 46', Depaiza (substituted on) 76', Calero (substituted on) 78'

Wed, 18 Jul 2018 24	Kabuscorp	1–1	Interclube	Coqueiros, Luanda
17:30 WAT (UTC+1)	Filhão 16' (pen.)		(red card) 14' Valdez; 70' Silva	Referee: Bernardo Nangolo; Pedro Alberto, António Livongue
Note: Jotabé (substituted off) 29' / Depaiza, Ebunga, Libero, Nari / Dário (substituted off) 78', Dr.Lami (c), Magola, Nandinho / Filhão (substituted off) 74', Nelito — Josué (substituted on) 29', Calero (substituted on) 74', Gui (substituted on) 78'

Sat, 21 Jul 2018 25	Sagrada	1–0	Kabuscorp	Sagrada Esperança, Dundo
15:00 WAT (UTC+1)	Edson 16'			Referee: Nuno Eduardo; Manuel Benguela, Nilton Armando
Note: Josué / Depaiza, Ebunga, Libero, Nari / Dário (substituted off) , Dr.Lami (c), Magola, Nandinho (substituted off) 46' / Filhão (substituted off) 74', Nelito — Calero (substituted on) 46', Gui (substituted on) , Tombé (substituted on) 74'

Sun, 29 Jul 2018 26	Kabuscorp	2–1	Cuando Cubango	Coqueiros, Luanda
17:00 WAT (UTC+1)	Nelito 86'; Calero 71'	Report	86' Liliano	Referee: Feliciano Lucas; Horácio Chissingui, Alexandre Bengue
Note: Josué / Ebunga, Libero, Nari, Rafa (substituted off) 46' / Filhão, Gui (substituted off) 38', Magola, Tombé (substituted off) 36' / Calero, Nelito — Dário (substituted on) 36', Dr.Lami (substituted on) 38', Nandinho (substituted on) 46'

Wed, 01 Aug 2018 27	Progresso	4–0	Kabuscorp	Coqueiros, Luanda
16:00 WAT (UTC+1)	Chiló 25', 63'; Eric 39'; Baby 51'	Report		Referee: Mauro de Oliveira; Domingos Francisco, Orlando Pimenta
Note: Josué / Ebunga, Libero, Mussumari (substituted off) 72', Nari / Dário, Dr.Lami (c), Filhão (substituted off) 55', Magola, Nandinho (substituted off) 70' / Nelito — Amaro (substituted on) 55', Cristiano (substituted on) 70' Carlos (substituted on) 72'

Sun, 05 Aug 2018 28	Kabuscorp	4–2	1º de Maio	Coqueiros, Luanda
17:00 WAT (UTC+1)	Calero 45+3', 90+2'; Depaiza 68'; Dr. Lami 87'		25' Telmo; 64' Etoh	Referee: Feliciano Lucas; Horácio Tchissingue, Alexandre Bengue
Note: Josué / Debele, Depaiza (substituted off) 84', Ebunga, Libero / Dário (substituted off) 90+4', Dr.Lami (c), Magola, Mussumari, Rafa (substituted off) 60' / Calero — Nandinho (substituted on) 60', Amaro (substituted on) 84', Carlos (substituted on) 90+4'

Thu, 23 Aug 2018 29	Bravos Maquis	1–0	Kabuscorp	Mundunduleno, Luena
15:00 WAT (UTC+1)	Gazeta 77'	Report		Referee: Paulo Sérgio; Celestino Golombole, Celso António
Note: Josué / Ebunga, Libero, Nari, Rafa (substituted off) 59' / Cristiano (substituted off) 73', Dr.Lami (c), Magola, Mussumari / Filhão (substituted off) 70', Nelito — Calero (substituted on) 59', Amaro (substituted on) 70', Tombé (substituted on) 73'

Wed, 29 Aug 2018 30	Kabuscorp	2–2	Académica	Coqueiros, Luanda
17:00 WAT (UTC+1)	Nelito 61' (pen.); Rafa 79'	Report	38' (o.g.) Josué; 52' Germano	Referee: Pedro dos Santos; Pedro Futa, Orlando Pimenta
Note: Josué / Ebunga, Libero, Lunguinha, Nari / Cristiano (substituted off) 46', Dr.Lami (c), Rafa, Tombé (substituted off) 47' / Filhão, Nelito — Amaro (substituted on) 46', Dário (substituted on) 47'

== Season statistics ==
=== Appearances and goals ===
No.	Pos	Nat	Player	Total		League	
No.	Pos	Nat	Player	Apps	Goals	Apps	Goals
Goalkeepers
1	GK	(Angola) ANG	Elber	14	0	14	0
12	GK	(Angola) ANG	Josué	7	0	6+1	0
22	GK	(Angola) ANG	Jotabé	8	0	8	0
Defenders
3	DF	(Angola) ANG	Libero	24	0	24	0
4	DF	(Angola) ANG	Debele	8	0	8	0
6	DF	(Angola) ANG	Emilson	7	0	7	0
7	DF	(Angola) ANG	Lunguinha	4	0	4	0
17	DF	(Angola) ANG	Depaiza	14	1	12+2	1
19	DF	(Angola) ANG	Nari	23	2	23	2
20	DF	(Angola) ANG	Mussumari	21	3	20+1	3
23	DF	(Angola) ANG	Rafa	8	1	6+2	1
24	DF	(Angola) ANG	Faustino	2	0	1+1	0
28	DF	(Angola) ANG	Lelé	3	0	3	0
29	DF	(Democratic Republic of the Congo) COD	Ebunga	22	2	22	2
Midfielders
5	MF	(Angola) ANG	Gui	14	0	5+9	0
8	MF	(Angola) ANG	Dário	23	0	17+6	0
10	MF	(Democratic Republic of the Congo) COD	Magola	25	2	22+3	2
11	MF	(Angola) ANG	Nandinho	25	3	21+4	3
13	MF	(Democratic Republic of the Congo) COD	Dr. Lami	24	3	20+4	3
16	MF	(Democratic Republic of the Congo) COD	Carlos	4	0	0+4	0
14	MF	(Angola) ANG	Tombé	10	1	5+5	1
18	MF	(Angola) ANG	Amaro	13	0	0+13	0
25	MF	(Angola) ANG	Cristiano	5	0	3+2	0
Forwards
9	FW	(Cameroon) CMR	Arouna	10	4	6+4	4
15	FW	(Angola) ANG	Bena	1	0	1	0
26	FW	(Angola) ANG	Filhão	22	3	20+2	3
27	FW	(Angola) ANG	Nelito	27	10	22+5	10
30	FW	(Argentina) ARG	Calero	20	7	8+12	7
Total
				308(80)	42	308(80)	42

=== Scorers ===
As of 29 August 2018

Rank	Name	League	
Rank	Name	Apps	Goals
1	(Angola) Nelito	22(5)	10
2	(Argentina) Calero	8(12)	7
3	(Cameroon) Arouna	6(4)	4
4	(Angola) Filhão	20(2)	3
5	(Democratic Republic of the Congo) Dr. Lami	20(4)	3
6	(Angola) Mussumari	20(1)	3
7	(Angola) Nandinho	21(4)	3
8	(Democratic Republic of the Congo) Ebunga	22	2
9	(Angola) Nari	23	2
10	(Democratic Republic of the Congo) Magola	22(3)	2
11	(Angola) Tombé	5(5)	1
12	(Angola) Rafa	6(2)	1
13	(Angola) Depaiza	12(2)	1
Total		–	42

- Note: Numbers in parentheses indicate appearances as substitute.

=== Clean sheets ===
As of 26 January 2019

Rank	Name	League		%
		Apps	CS	
1	(Angola) Elber	14	5	35
2	(Angola) Jotabé	8	1	12
3	(Angola) Josué	6	0	0
Total			6	

== See also ==
- List of Kabuscorp S.C.P. players
