= 2018–19 Kabuscorp S.C.P. season =

Kabuscorp Sport Clube do Palanca
2018–19 season
- President: Bento Kangamba
- Manager: Paulo Torres (Oct 2018–)
- Stadium: Estádio dos Coqueiros
Home colours	Away colours
- All statistics correct as of 28 Oct 2018.

The 2018–19 season of Kabuscorp Sport Clube do Palanca is the club's 17th season in Angolan football and the 12th consecutive season in the Girabola, the top flight league of Angolan football. In 2018–19, the club participated in the Girabola and the Angola Cup.

== FAF Penalty ==
Kabuscorp forfeited 9 points, for failing to address payment claims by a total 6 individuals, following a 15-day deadline stipulated by the Angolan Football Federation (FAF). The first case includes former player Adawá Mokanga, the second case includes former staff members Afonso Paxe Filho, Dombasi João, Kutama Shabani and former head-coach Romeu Filemón whereas the third case refers to former club physician Dr. Caetano Maria.

== FIFA penalty ==
The Angolan Football Federation received a letter from FIFA ordering Kabuscorp to be relegated for failing to meet payment claims by former player Rivaldo. Even though the debt has reportedly been paid in full, Kabuscorp failed to pay within the established deadline. The club faced a second relegation penalty regarding their dispute with TP Mazembe

== Squad information ==
Alternative 1	Alternative 2

Goal-keeper 1	Goal-keeper 2

=== Players ===
No.	Nat	Nick	Name	Pos	Date of birth (age)
Goalkeepers
1	(Angola)	Dadão	Manuel Nzagi Pedro	–	20 June 1992 (aged 27)
22	(Angola)	Jotabé	João Baptista da Silva	–	30 October 1987 (aged 32)
Defenders
6	(Angola)	Celson	Celson João Barros Costa	CB	5 October 1986 (aged 33)
7	(Angola)	Lunguinha	António Luís dos Santos Serrado	RB	16 January 1986 (aged 33)
15	(Angola)	Fabrício	Fabrício Mafuta	CB	20 September 1988 (aged 31)
17	(Angola)	Depaiza	Estevão Manuel Quitocota Cahoco	LB	22 February 1991 (aged 28)
23	(Angola)	Rafa	Paulo Kiela Pereira Bravo	DF	11 September 2000 (aged 19)
28	(Angola)	Zebedeu	Zebedeu Jordão S. Morais	CB	0 December 1988 (aged 31)
29	(Democratic Republic of the Congo)	Ebunga	Patou Ebunga-Simbi	LB	26 August 1983 (aged 36)
Midfielders
10	(Democratic Republic of the Congo)	Magola	Yves Magola Mapanda	CM	10 October 1985 (aged 34)
11	(Angola)	Cabibi I	Leonardo Manuel Isola Ramos	RW	23 December 1992 (aged 27)
13	(Democratic Republic of the Congo)	Dr Lami	Lami Yakini Thili	LW	4 April 1982 (aged 37)
18	(Angola)	Amaro	Amândio Felipe da Costa	RW	12 November 1986 (aged 33)
20	(Angola)	Balacai	Evaristo Maurício Pascoal	LW	13 August 1995 (aged 24)
24	(Angola)	Água Doce	José Fernandes Mbuta	CM	–
26	(Angola)	Bagaza	—	MF	–
Forwards
9	(Rwanda)	Daddy	Etekiama Agiti Tady	–	12 December 1986 (aged 33)
19	(Angola)	Dilman	Dilman Edvair Furtado Ribeiro	–	0 December 1994 (aged 25)
27	(Angola)	Nelito	Nelione José Tavares	–	–

=== Pre-season transfers ===
No.	Nat	Nick	Name	Pos	Date of birth (age)	
Transfers out To
9	(Cameroon)	Arouna	Arouna Dang À Bissene	FW	22 April 1993 (aged 26)	—
30	(Argentina)	Calero	Franco Néstor Calero	FW	9 March 1989 (aged 30)	—
8	(Angola)	Dário	Dário de Sousa Borges Cardoso	LW	25 June 1982 (aged 37)	—
4	(Angola)	Debele	Edgar Elias Hebo Kissanga	CB	14 August 1988 (aged 31)	—
1	(Angola)	Elber	Jorge Mota Faial Delgado	GK	24 June 1991 (aged 28)	Petro de Luanda
26	(Angola)	Filhão	João de Oliveira	FW	14 June 1995 (aged 24)	Recreativo do Libolo
5	(Angola)	Gui	Eufrânio Carlos da Silva Cungulo	FW	31 October 1996 (aged 23)	—
28	(Angola)	Lelé	Fabiano Miguel Peng	DF	2 August 1990 (aged 29)	—
3	(Angola)	Líbero	Quintino Feliciano Pereira	CB	—	—
20	(Angola)	Mussumari	Gabriel Frederico Mussumari	MF	17 December 1988 (aged 31)	Bravos do Maquis
11	(Angola)	Nandinho	Wilson Fernandes Augusto Macamo	RW	17 September 1985 (aged 34)	Recreativo do Libolo
19	(Angola)	Nari	Bráulio Adélio de Olim Diniz	DM	30 April 1987 (aged 32)	Petro de Luanda
Transfers in From
24	(Angola)	Água Doce	José Fernandes Mbuta	CM	—	Santa Rita de Cássia
20	(Angola)	Balacai	Evaristo Maurício Pascoal	FW	13 August 1995 (aged 24)	Progresso Sambizanga
11	(Angola)	Cabibi I	Leonardo Manuel Isola Ramos	RW	23 December 1992 (aged 27)	Domant FC
6	(Angola)	Celson	Celson João Barros Costa	CB	5 October 1986 (aged 33)	Recreativo do Libolo
1	(Angola)	Dadão	Manuel Nzagi Pedro	GK	20 June 1992 (aged 27)	Bravos do Maquis
9	(Rwanda)	Daddy	Etekiama Agiti Tady	FW	12 December 1986 (aged 33)	AS Vita Club
19	(Angola)	Dilman	Dilman Edvair Furtado Ribeiro	FW	0 December 1992 (aged 27)	Primeiro de Maio
15	(Angola)	Fabrício	Fabrício Mafuta	CB	20 September 1988 (aged 31)	Interclube
28	(Angola)	Zebedeu	Zebedeu Jordão S. Morais	CB	0 December 1988 (aged 31)	Académica do Lobito

=== Mid-season transfers ===
No.	Nat	Nick	Name	Pos	Date of birth (age)	
Transfers out To
1	(Angola)	Dadão	Manuel Nzagi Pedro	GK	20 June 1992 (aged 27)	Académica do Lobito
6	(Angola)	Celson	Celson João Barros Costa	CB	5 October 1986 (aged 33)	–
Transfers in From
1	(Angola)	Langanga	Landu Langanga	GK	15 October 1996 (aged 23)	Interclube
6	(Angola)	Zizí	Isidro de Oliveira André Manuel	MF	0 December 1996 (aged 23)	Cuando Cubango FC
8	(Angola)	Tresor	Tresor Stanislau de Sousa	MF	10 February 1993 (aged 26)	Petro de Luanda
14	(Angola)	Meda	Vidal Miguel Paulo Nsiandamba	MF	18 November 1992 (aged 27)	ASA
16	(Angola)	Yuri	–	–	–	–
25	(Angola)	Dany	Silas Daniel Satonho	MF	14 January 1990 (aged 29)	Interclube

=== Staff ===
Nat	Name	Position(s)	Date of birth (age)
Technical staff
(Portugal)	Paulo Torres	Head coach	25 November 1971 (aged 48)
(Angola)	Quim Manuel	Assistant coach	–
(Angola)	Adriano Soares	Goalkeeper Coach	–
Medical
(Angola)	Caetano Maria	Physician	–
(Angola)	Jorge de Almeida	Physio	–
Management
(Angola)	Bento Kangamba	Chairman	6 July 1965 (aged 53)
(Angola)	Domingos Jacinto	Vice-Chairman	–

== Overview ==
Competition	First match	Last match	Final position	Record							
Competition	First match	Last match	Final position	Pld	W	D	L	GF	GA	GD	Win %
Girabola	28 October 2018	19 May 2019	4th (Relegated)	30	13	10	7	35	26	+9	43.33
Angola Cup	8 May 2019	15 May 2019	Quarter-finals	2	1	0	1	7	7	+0	50.00
Total				32	14	10	8	42	33	+9	43.75

Last updated: 19 May 2018

== Angolan League ==
=== League table ===
Pos	Team	Pld	W	D	L	GF	GA	GD	Pts	Qualification or relegation (Note: No teams enter the Confederation Cup. Desportivo da Huíla are Angola Cup runners-up (Primeiro de Agosto are cup winners) but declined to participate, while Kabuscorp were relegated and thus not eligible.)
2	Petro de Luanda	30	19	7	4	40	15	+25	64	Qualification for Champions League
3	Desportivo da Huíla (Note: Primeiro de Agosto and Desportivo da Huíla forfeited 3 points on suspicion of match-fixing on the 17th round match.)	30	15	8	7	36	25	+11	50	
4	Kabuscorp (Note: Kabuscorp had forfeited 9 points as a result of payment default. On appeal, after the plaintiffs dropped their claims, all points were restored. Regarding their dispute with former player Rivaldo, the club was ordered to be relegated by FIFA for failing to pay the outstanding debt within the established deadline.) (R)	30	13	10	7	35	26	+9	49	Relegation to Provincial stages
5	Interclube	30	11	11	8	27	22	+5	44	
6	Sagrada Esperança	30	10	11	9	31	26	+5	41	

Source: Girabola.com
Rules for classification: 1) Points; 2) Head-to-head points; 3) Goal difference; 4) Head-to-head goal difference; 5) Goals scored; 6) Fair-play points; 7) Play-off.
(R) Relegated

=== Results ===
==== Results summary ====
Overall								Home						Away					
Pld	W	D	L	GF	GA	GD	Pts	W	D	L	GF	GA	GD	W	D	L	GF	GA	GD
30	13	10	7	35	26	+9	49	8	4	3	23	14	+9	5	6	4	12	12	0

Last updated: 19 May 2019.
Source: Girabola

==== Results by round ====
Round	1	2	3	4	5	6	7	8	9	10	11	12	13	14	15	16	17	18	19	20	21	22	23	24	25	26	27	28	29	30
Ground	A	H	A	H	A	H	A	H	A	H	A	H	A	H	A	H	A	H	A	H	A	H	A	H	A	H	A	H	A	H
Result	D	W	L	L	D	W	W	W	L	W	D	W	W	D	L	W	L	W	W	D	W	D	D	L	W	W	D	D	D	L
Position	3	4	9	11	11	6	5	3	5	4	4	4	4	4	4	4	4	4	4	4	4	4	4	4	4	4	4	4	3	4

Updated to match(es) played on 19 May 2019. Source: GirabolaZap
A = Away; H = Home; W = Win; D = Draw; L = Loss

==== Results overview ====
Win Draw Loss

Team	Home score	Away score
Cuando Cubango FC	3–2	1–1
Interclube	2–1	0-1
Desportivo da Huíla	2–0	1-2
ASA	0-1	2–1
Santa Rita de Cássia	0–0	1–1
Académica do Lobito	3–1	1–0
Progresso do Sambizanga	1–1	2–1
Recreativo do Libolo	1–0	0–0
Petro de Luanda	1-4	0-2
Saurimo FC	3–0	3–1
Sporting de Cabinda	3–1	0–0
Recreativo da Caála	3–1	0–0
Sagrada Esperança	1–1	1–0
Bravos do Maquis	0–0	0–0
1º de Agosto	0-1	0-2

=== Match details ===
Sat, 28 Oct 2018 01	Cuando Cubango	1–1	Kabuscorp	Eucaliptos, Kuito
15:00 WAT (UTC+1)	Zizí 31' (pen.)	Report	3' Daddy	Referee: Rodrigues Aleixo; António Livongue, Nicodemos Calembela

Sat, 03 Nov 2018 02	Kabuscorp	2–1	Interclube	Coqueiros, Luanda
15:00 WAT (UTC+1)	Daddy 34', 77' (pen.)	Report	4' Filipe	Referee: António Caxala; Júlio Lemos, Joaquim Rocha

Sun, 25 Nov 2018 03	Desportivo Huíla	2–1	Kabuscorp	Estádio do Ferrovia, Lubango
15:00 WAT (UTC+1)	Bruno 25'; Lionel 72'		81' Ebunga	Referee: Benjamin Andrade; Bernabé Ngulo, Tito Capingala

Sun, 02 Dec 2018 04	Kabuscorp	0–1	ASA	Coqueiros, Luanda
18:00 WAT (UTC+1)		Report	65' Modeste	Referee: Bernardo Nangolo; Pedro Alberto, António Pitra

Sun, 09 Dec 2018 05	S^{ta} Rita de Cássia	1–1	Kabuscorp	4 de Janeiro, Uíge
15:00 WAT (UTC+1)	Lelé 80'		30' Ebunga	Referee: João Kavungo; Evaristo Paco, João Bungo

Wed, 12 Dec 2018 06	Kabuscorp	3–1	Académica	Coqueiros, Luanda
18:00 WAT (UTC+1)	Daddy 21'; Magola 66'; Ebunga 90'		45+1' Ayala	Referee: Chitano Francisco; Wilson Ntyamba, Jeremias Cafussa

Tue, 18 Dec 2018 07	Progresso	1–2	Kabuscorp	Coqueiros, Luanda
18:00 WAT (UTC+1)	Maria Pia 89'	Report	45+1' Daddy; 59' Água Doce	Referee: Airton Carmelino; Evanildo Lopes, Luís Mateus

Sat, 22 Dec 2018 08	Kabuscorp	1–0	Rec do Libolo	Coqueiros, Luanda
18:00 WAT (UTC+1)	Dr. Lami 89'			Referee: Paulo Sérgio; Segunda Tchisseque, Lídio Coimbra

Sun, 30 Dec 2018 09	Petro Atlético	2–0	Kabuscorp	11 de Novembro, Luanda
17:30 WAT (UTC+1)	Tony 34'; Vá 58'	Report		Referee: Feliciano Lucas; José Felix, Dário Gaspar

Sat, 05 Jan 2018 10	Kabuscorp	3–0	Saurimo FC	Coqueiros, Luanda
18:00 WAT (UTC+1)	Simão 29'; Paulito 72'; Daddy 76' (pen.)	Report		Referee: João Mavungo; Evaristo Baco, João Bundo

Wed, 09 Jan 2019 11	Sporting Cabinda	0–0	Kabuscorp	Tafe, Cabinda
15:00 WAT (UTC+1)				Referee: Sabino de Carvalho; Pedro Futa, Ladislau Miguel

Tue, 15 Jan 2019 12	Kabuscorp	3–1	Rec da Caála	Coqueiros, Luanda
18:00 WAT (UTC+1)	Cabibi 47'; Fabrício 82'; Paulito 90+1'	Report	62' Pedro	Referee: Rafael Dala; Nelson Kiala, Pedro Micolo

Sat, 19 Jan 2019 13	Sagrada	0–1	Kabuscorp	Sagrada Esperança, Dundo
15:00 WAT (UTC+1)		Report	17' Paulito	Referee: Nuno Eduardo; Manuel Benguela, Nilton Armando

Sat, 26 Jan 2019 14	Kabuscorp	0–0	Bravos Maquis	Coqueiros, Luanda
19:45 WAT (UTC+1)		Report		Referee: António Dungula; Tito Pena, José Silyia

Sun, 03 Feb 2019 15	1º de Agosto	2–0	Kabuscorp	11 de Novembro, Luanda
17:30 WAT (UTC+1)	Macaia 38'; Mabululu 46'	Report		Referee: Paulo Talaya; Ricardo Daniel, Joaquim Chio

Tue, 26 Feb 2019 16	Kabuscorp	3–2	Cuando Cubango	Coqueiros, Luanda
17:00 WAT (UTC+1)	Amaro 13'; Vally 47'; Meda 90+3'		74' Cassinda; 86' Clovice	Referee: Mbunga Kazi; Regina Ngola, Sérgio David

Sat, 02 Mar 2019 17	Interclube	1–0	Kabuscorp	22 de Junho, Luanda
15:30 WAT (UTC+1)	Ito 67'	Report		Referee: Hélder Martins; Júlio Lemos, Joaquim Rocha

Sat, 09 Mar 2019 18	Kabuscorp	2–0	Desportivo Huíla	Coqueiros, Luanda
17:30 WAT (UTC+1)	Simão 22'; Meda 82'			Referee: Mauro de Oliveira; Domingos Francisco, Nery Silva

Tue, 12 Mar 2019 19	ASA	1–2	Kabuscorp	Coqueiros, Luanda
15:30 WAT (UTC+1)	Victorino 84'	Report	21' Fabrício; 70' Daddy	Referee: Miguel Mateus; Celestino Golombole, Celso António

Sat, 16 Mar 2019 20	Kabuscorp	0–0	S^{ta} Rita de Cássia	Coqueiros, Luanda
15:00 WAT (UTC+1)				Referee: José Chitumba; Estanislau Guedes, Nicodemos Calembela

Sun, 31 Mar 2019 21	Académica	0–1	Kabuscorp	Ombaka, Benguela
16:30 WAT (UTC+1)		Report	89' (pen.) Amaro	Referee: Ailton Carmelino; Evanildo Martins, Nery Silva

Wed, 03 Apr 2019 22	Kabuscorp	1–1	Progresso	Coqueiros, Luanda
18:00 WAT (UTC+1)	Dr. Lami 59'	Report	70' Yano	Referee: João Goma; José Felix, Dário Gaspar

Sat, 06 Apr 2019 23	Rec do Libolo	0–0	Kabuscorp	Estádio Municipal, Calulo
15:00 WAT (UTC+1)				Referee: António Caxala; Júlio Lemos, Luís Mateus

Sat, 13 Apr 2019 24	Kabuscorp	1–4	Petro Atlético	11 de Novembro, Luanda
17:30 WAT (UTC+1)	Dany 78'		6', 18', 37' Azulão; 90+5' Mateus	Referee: Benjamin Andrade; Judith Mestre, Nilton Armando

Wed, 17 Apr 2019 25	Saurimo FC	1–3	Kabuscorp	Mangueiras, Saurimo
15:00 WAT (UTC+1)	Agoya 33'	Report	22' (o.g.) Yuri; 35' Ebunga; 68' Daddy	Referee: Mbunga Kazi; Regina Ngola, Sérgio David

Sun, 21 Apr 2019 26	Kabuscorp	3–1	Sporting Cabinda	Coqueiros, Luanda
17:30 WAT (UTC+1)	Zé 6' (o.g.); Dany 27'; Dr. Lami 59'		39' (o.g.) Simão	Referee: Paulo Sérgio; Segunda Tchisseque, Ilídio Coimbra

Wed, 24 Apr 2019 27	Rec da Caála	0–0	Kabuscorp	Mártires da Canhala, Caála
15:00 WAT (UTC+1)				Referee: Chitano Francisco, Wilson Ntyamba, Estanislau Guedes

Sat, 27 Apr 2019 28	Kabuscorp	1–1	Sagrada	Coqueiros, Luanda
17:30 WAT (UTC+1)	Daddy 86' (pen.)		7' Jiresse	Referee: Tânia Duarte; Luísa Luhaco, Andália Jeremias

Sun, 12 May 2019 29	Bravos Maquis	0–0	Kabuscorp	Mundunduleno, Luena
15:00 WAT (UTC+1)		Report		Referee: José Maxia; Cláudio Vunge, Flávio Dias

Wed, 22 May 2019 30	Kabuscorp	0–1	1º de Agosto	Coqueiros, Luanda
16:00 WAT (UTC+1)		Report	45+1' Mabululu	Referee: Nuno Eduardo; Judith Mestre, Manuel Benguela

== Angola Cup ==
=== Round of 16 ===
Wed, 08 May 2019 R16	Wiliete SC	2–3	Kabuscorp	Ombaka, Benguela
16:00 WAT (UTC+1)	Kalú 82'; J.Vala 90+1'		5' Meda; 78' Amaro	Referee: José Álvaro; Estanislau Guedes, Rosário Calembela

=== Quarter finals ===
Wed, 15 May 2019 QF	Desportivo	0–0 (5–4 p)	Kabuscorp	Ferrovia, Lubango
15:00 WAT (UTC+1)		Report		Referee: Horácio Tchissingui; Alexandre Bengue, Gilberto Kativa

== Season statistics ==
=== Appearances and goals ===
No.	Pos	Nat	Player	Total		League		Angola Cup	
No.	Pos	Nat	Player	Apps	Goals	Apps	Goals	Apps	Goals
Goalkeepers
1	GK	(Angola) ANG	Langanga	0	0	0	0	0	0
12	GK	(Angola) ANG	Josué	0	0	0	0	0	0
22	GK	(Angola) ANG	Jotabé	2	0	2	0	0	0
Defenders
7	DF	(Angola) ANG	Lunguinha	2	0	2	0	0	0
15	DF	(Angola) ANG	Fabrício	2	0	2	0	0	0
17	DF	(Angola) ANG	Depaiza	0	0	0	0	0	0
19	DF	(Angola) ANG	Nari	0	0	0	0	0	0
23	DF	(Angola) ANG	Rafa	0	0	0	0	0	0
28	DF	(Angola) ANG	Zebedeu	1	0	1	0	0	0
29	DF	(Democratic Republic of the Congo) COD	Ebunga	2	0	2	0	0	0
Midfielders
10	MF	(Democratic Republic of the Congo) COD	Magola	2	0	2	0	0	0
11	MF	(Angola) ANG	Cabibi I	2	0	0+2	0	0	0
13	MF	(Democratic Republic of the Congo) COD	Dr. Lami	2	0	2	0	0	0
18	MF	(Angola) ANG	Amaro	2	0	2	0	0	0
20	MF	(Angola) ANG	Balacai	2	0	0+2	0	0	0
24	MF	(Angola) ANG	Água Doce	1	0	0+1	0	0	0
26	MF	(Angola) ANG	Bagaza	2	0	2	0	0	0
Forwards
9	FW	(Rwanda) RWA	Daddy	2	3	2	3	0	0
19	FW	(Angola) ANG	Dilman	1	0	0+1	0	0	0
27	FW	(Angola) ANG	Nelito	1	0	1	0	0	0
Players transferred out during the season
1	GK	(Angola) ANG	Dadão	0	0	0	0	0	0
6	DF	(Angola) ANG	Celson	2	0	2	0	0	0
Total
				0	0	0	0	0	0

Last updated: 3 November 2018
Source: Competitions

=== Scorers ===
As of 3 February 2019

Rank	Name	League		Cup		Total	
		Apps	Goals	Apps	Goals	Apps	Goals
1	(Rwanda) Daddy	14	6			14	6
2	(Democratic Republic of the Congo) Ebunga	14	3			14	3
3	(Angola) Paulito	2(3)	3			2(3)	3
4	(Angola) Cabibi	2(10)	1			2(10)	1
5	(Angola) Simão	6(2)	1			6(2)	1
6	(Angola) Água Doce	9(2)	1			9(2)	1
7	(Democratic Republic of the Congo) Dr. Lami	15	1			15	1
7	(Angola) Fabrício	15	1			15	1
7	(Democratic Republic of the Congo) Magola	15	1			15	1
Total			18				18

=== Clean sheets ===
As of 3 February 2019

Rank	Name	League		Cup		Total		%
		Apps	CS	Apps	CS	Apps	CS	
1	(Angola) Dadão	4	2	0	0	4	2	50
2	(Angola) Jotabé	10	3	0	0	10	3	30
–	(Angola) Josué	0	0	0	0	0	0	
Total			5				5	

=== Season progress ===
28/10	3/11	25/11	2/12	9/12	12/12	18/12	22/12	30/12	5/1	9/1	15/1	20/1	26/1	3/2	26/2	2/3	9/3	12/3	16/3	31/3	3/4	6/4	13/4	17/4	21/4	24/4	27/4	8/5	12/5	15/5	19/5
CCU	INT	DES	ASA	SRC	ACA	PRO	LIB	PET	SAU	SCC	CAA	SAG	MAQ	PRI	CCU	INT	DES	ASA	SRC	ACA	PRO	LIB	PET	SAU	SCC	CAA	SAG	WIL	MAQ	DES	PRI
Girabola																												AC	GB	AC	GB

== See also ==
- List of Kabuscorp S.C.P. players
