= Bissene =

Bissene is a surname. Notable people with the surname include:

- Arouna Dang Bissene (born 1993), Cameroonian footballer
- Moustapha Ngae A-Bissene (born 1998), Cameroonian footballer
