= Paulo Alves =

Paulo Alves may refer to:

- Paulo Alves (footballer, born 1969), Portuguese former football forward and coach
- Paulo Alves (footballer, born 1993), Portuguese football midfielder
- Paulão (footballer, born 1969), Paulo António Alves (1969–2021), Angolan former football midfielder
- Paulinho (footballer, born December 1997), Paulo Manuel Neves Alves, Portuguese football midfielder
