= Stephane Nwatsock =

Cameroonian professional footballer

Personal information
- Full name: Stephane Aoudou Nwatsock Abouem
- Date of birth: 28 January 2000 (age 26)
- Place of birth: Cameroon
- Height: 1.84 m (6 ft 0 in)
- Position: Centre-back

Team information
- Current team: Sacachispas

Youth career
- 2018–2019: Banfield

Senior career*
Years	Team	Apps	(Gls)
2019–	Sacachispas	8	(0)
- * Club domestic league appearances and goals as of 20:02, 30 August 2020 (UTC)

Stephane Aoudou Nwatsock Abouem (born 28 January 2000) is a Cameroonian professional footballer who plays as a centre-back for Sacachispas.

== Career ==
Nwatsock left his homeland and headed to Argentina in 2018, signing with Banfield. He then, in 2019, joined Primera B Metropolitana side Sacachispas; who his countryman and housemate, Moustapha Ngae A-Bissene, also played for. Nwatsock made his professional debut on 17 November, playing the full duration of a goalless draw at home to Acassuso. Seven further appearances followed in 2019–20.

== Career statistics ==
As of 30 August 2020.

Appearances and goals by club, season and competition
Club	Season	League			Cup		League Cup		Continental		Other		Total	
Club	Season	Division	Apps	Goals	Apps	Goals	Apps	Goals	Apps	Goals	Apps	Goals	Apps	Goals
Sacachispas	2019–20	Primera B Metropolitana	8	0	0	0	—		—		0	0	8	0
Career total			8	0	0	0	—		—		0	0	8	0
