= Moustapha Ngae A-Bissene =

Cameroonian footballer

Personal information
- Full name: Moustapha Ngae Dang À Bissene
- Date of birth: 21 September 1998 (age 28)
- Place of birth: Yaoundé, Cameroon
- Height: 1.83 m (6 ft 0 in)
- Position: Forward

Team information
- Current team: Sacachispas

Youth career
- 2017: Huracán

Senior career*
Years	Team	Apps	(Gls)
2018–	Sacachispas	26	(2)
- * Club domestic league appearances and goals as of 16:36, 2 January 2021 (UTC)

Moustapha Ngae Dang À Bissene (born 21 September 1998), known as Moustapha Ngae A-Bissene, is a Cameroonian professional footballer who plays as a forward for Sacachispas.

== Career ==
A-Bissene began his career in Cameroon in the lower divisions, attracting interest from other countries, though injury halted any potential move. He moved to Argentina with Huracán in 2017, following in the footsteps of his brother. A-Bissene, via a Tigre trial, moved to Sacachispas in 2018.

He made his debut on 4 February against Defensores de Belgrano, coming off the bench in Primera B Metropolitana to replace Lucas Fernández in a 2–1 loss. A-Bissene was substituted on ten more times across 2017–18 and 2018–19, prior to his first start arriving on 24 March 2019 versus Talleres; though he was sent off after fifty-six minutes.

A-Bissene scored his first senior goal on 28 September, as he netted the winning goal in a league victory over Flandria.

== Personal life ==
A-Bissene's brother, Arouna Dang Bissene, is also a footballer. Whilst with Sacachispas, A-Bissene lived with fellow Cameroonian footballer Stephane Nwatsock.

== Career statistics ==
As of 2 January 2021.

Appearances and goals by club, season and competition
Club	Season	League			Cup		League Cup		Continental		Other		Total	
Club	Season	Division	Apps	Goals	Apps	Goals	Apps	Goals	Apps	Goals	Apps	Goals	Apps	Goals
Sacachispas	2017–18	Primera B Metropolitana	6	0	0	0	—		—		0	0	6	0
Sacachispas	2018–19	Primera B Metropolitana	7	0	0	0	—		—		0	0	7	0
Sacachispas	2019–20	Primera B Metropolitana	13	2	0	0	—		—		0	0	13	2
Career total			26	2	0	0	—		—		0	0	26	2
