= Fabrício Mafuta =

Angolan footballer

Fabrício
Personal information
- Full name: Fabrício Mafuta
- Date of birth: 20 September 1988 (age 38)
- Place of birth: Luanda, Angola
- Height: 1.81 m (5 ft 11 in)
- Position: Defender

Team information
- Current team: Bravos do Maquis
- Number: 4

Senior career*
Years	Team	Apps	(Gls)
2007	Santos Viana		
2007–2008	AS Bari	0	(0)
2009–2018	Interclube		
2019	Kabuscorp	20	(2)
2020–	Bravos do Maquis		

International career^{‡}
2011–	Angola	26	(0)
Medal record
Men's football
Representing Angola
African Nations Championship
Runner-up	2011 Sudan
- * Club domestic league appearances and goals as of 25 January 2013 ‡ National team caps and goals as of 31 May 2018

Fabrício Mafuta is an Angolan footballer who plays as a defender for F.C. Bravos do Maquis. During the 2016 season he has played 2 FIFA matches and 1 Non-FIFA match, scoring no goals or substitutions.

In 2018–19, he signed in for Kabuscorp Sport Clube of Angola.

In 2019–20, he signed in for FC Bravos do Maquis in the Angolan league, the Girabola.

== Honours ==
Angola

- African Nations Championship: runner-up 2011
