= Daddy Birori =

Footballer (born 1986)

Personal information
- Date of birth: 12 December 1986 (age 39)
- Place of birth: Kinshasa, Zaire
- Position: Forward

Team information
- Current team: AS Vita Club

Senior career*
Years	Team	Apps	(Gls)
2008–2009	Mukura Victory Sports		
2009–2010	ATRACO		
2010–2012	Kiyovu Sports		
2012–2019	AS Vita Club		
2019	Kabuscorp		
2019–2020	Sagrada Esperança		
2020–	AS Vita Club		

International career
2009–2014	Rwanda	18	(5)
- * Club domestic league appearances and goals as of 09:22, 24 May 2014 (UTC)

Daddy Birori (born 12 December 1986), also known as Etekiama Agiti Tady, is a footballer who plays as a forward for AS Vita Club. Born in Zaire, he made 18 appearances for the Rwanda national team scoring five goals.

== Career ==
Birori has played club football for Mukura Victory Sports, ATRACO, Kiyovu Sports and AS Vita Club.

He made his senior international debut for Rwanda in 2009, and has appeared in FIFA World Cup qualifying matches.

In 2018–19, he signed for Angolan club Kabuscorp Sport Clube, playing in the Girabola.

In 2019–20, he signed for Kabuscorp's league rivals Sagrada Esperança.

== Suspension for double identity ==
Birori was involved in the 2015 Africa Cup of Nations qualification representing Rwanda. In the first round, he played in two games against Libya, the first leg on 18 May ended in a 0–0 draw and on 31 May in the second leg he scored a hat-trick in a 3–0 victory. The Libyan Football Federation filed a complaint with Confederation of African Football that the player should not be eligible and that he had participated in the 2009 CAF Champions League as a Congolese man. Rwandese Association Football Federation Secretary General Olivier Mulindahabi stated that the player was eligible as he had played within Rwanda for five years and he was a Rwandan passport holder.

In the second round games, Rwanda defeated the Republic of the Congo 4–3 on penalties after a 2–0 loss on 20 July and a 2–0 win in the second leg on 2 August. Rwanda qualified for the group stage (third round) where they were drawn with Nigeria, South Africa and Sudan. The Congolese Football Association also complained about the eligibility of Birori.

On 18 August, CAF announced that they had suspended the player for using two different names and dates of birth. The Rwandan passport Daddy Birori listed the date of birth as 12 December 1986 while the Congolese passport listed the name Etekiama Agil Taddy with a date of birth of 13 December 1990.

In addition, Rwanda were disqualified from the 2015 Africa Cup of Nations qualification competition for attempting to mislead CAF. In a statement CAF said that the "Rwandan Football Federation (FERWAFA) maintained that to their knowledge the player Dady Birori had one identity" yet that "investigations revealed that he was summoned as Etekiama Agiti Tady by FERWAFA to join the national team of Rwanda." CAF also overturned the result of the Rwanda victory over Republic of the Congo on 2 August, as a result Congo took the place of Rwanda in Group A of the third round. Stephen Constantine, the coach of Rwanda remarked that "I am bitterly disappointed with CAFs[sic] decision, the same complaint was made by Libya and it was dismissed so what has changed ![sic]"

On 17 September 2014, Birori was suspended by CAF for two years.

== Career statistics ==
Scores and results list Rwanda's goal tally first, score column indicates score after each Birori goal.

List of international goals scored by Daddy Birori
No.	Date	Venue	Opponent	Score	Result	Competition
1	27 May 2012	Stade Mustapha Ben Jannet, Monastir, Tunisia	Tunisia	1–3	1–5	Friendly
2	29 November 2012	Mandela National Stadium, Kampala, Uganda	Zanzibar	1–2	1–2	2012 CECAFA Cup
3	1 December 2012	Mandela National Stadium, Kampala, Uganda	Eritrea	1–0	2–0	2012 CECAFA Cup
4	31 May 2014	Stade Régional Nyamirambo, Kigali, Rwanda	Libya	1–0	3–0	2015 Africa Cup of Nations qualification
5	31 May 2014	Stade Régional Nyamirambo, Kigali, Rwanda	Libya	2–0	3–0	2015 Africa Cup of Nations qualification
6	31 May 2014	Stade Régional Nyamirambo, Kigali, Rwanda	Libya	3–0	3–0	2015 Africa Cup of Nations qualification
