= Ghislain Mukendi Kalobo =

Congolese footballer

Personal information
- Date of birth: 4 June 1985 (age 41)
- Place of birth: Kinshasa, Zaïre
- Height: 1.78 m (5 ft 10 in)
- Position: Midfielder

Senior career*
Years	Team	Apps	(Gls)
2004–2005	AS Vita Club		
2006–2007	DC Motema Pembe		
–2010	AS New Soger		
2011–2012	Kabuscorp S.C.P.		
2013–2014	G.D. Sagrada Esperança		

International career
2007	DR Congo	2	(0)
- * Club domestic league appearances and goals

Ghislain Mukendi Kalobo (born 4 June 1985) is a former Congolese footballer who played as a midfielder.
