= Josué (Angolan footballer) =

Angolan footballer (born 2000)

Personal information
- Full name: Eduardo João Bunga
- Date of birth: 17 July 2000 (age 26)
- Position: Goalkeeper

Team information
- Current team: Kabuscorp
- Number: 12

Senior career*
Years	Team	Apps	(Gls)
2016–	Kabuscorp	9	(0)

International career
2016–	Angola	3	(0)
- * Club domestic league appearances and goals as of 29 August 2018

Eduardo João Bunga, better known as Josué (born July 17, 2000) is an Angolan international footballer. He currently plays for Kabuscorp S.C.P. in the Angolan league, the Girabola.

He made his international debut for Angola at the age of 15 in a 3–0 loss against Malawi at the 2016 COSAFA Cup.
