= Romeu Filemón =

Angolan football manager

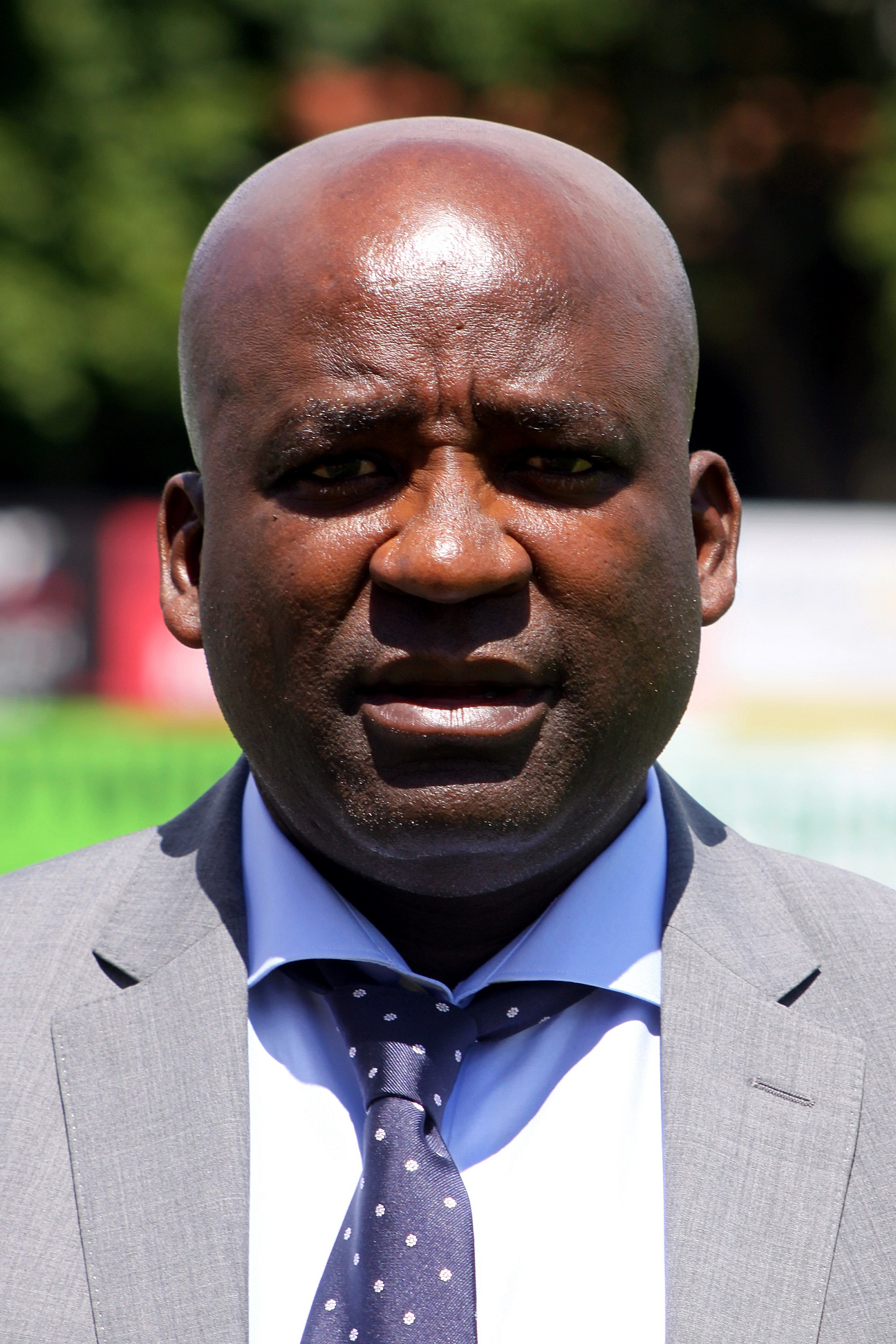

Personal information
- Full name: Romeu Katatu Filemón
- Date of birth: 19 July 1965 (age 61)

Team information
- Current team: Recreativo do Libolo (manager)

Managerial career
- Years: Team
- 2011–2013: 1º de Agosto
- 2013: Benfica de Luanda
- 2013–2014: 1º de Agosto
- 2014–2015: Angola
- 2020–: Rec do Libolo

Romeu Katatu Filemón is an Angolan football manager.

In February 2014, he was announced as the Angola national team manager, a job he retained until the end of December 2015.
