= Paulo Alves (footballer, born 1993) =

Portuguese footballer

Personal information
- Full name: Paulo Alexandre Sousa Alves
- Date of birth: 19 December 1993 (age 32)
- Place of birth: Lisbon, Portugal
- Height: 1.88 m (6 ft 2 in)
- Position: Defensive midfielder

Youth career
- 2002–2010: Odivelas
- 2010–2012: Académica

Senior career*
Years	Team	Apps	(Gls)
2012–2013	Vasco Gama Vidigueira	23	(0)
2013–2014	Nogueirense	24	(5)
2014–2015	Doxa	9	(0)
2015	Kabuscorp	2	(0)
- * Club domestic league appearances and goals as of 00:00, 7 March 2016 (UTC)

Paulo Alexandre Sousa Alves (born 19 December 1993 in Lisbon) is a Portuguese footballer who plays as a defensive midfielder.
