= Nandinho (footballer, born 1998) =

Angolan footballer

Personal information
- Full name: Fernando Jacinto Quissanga
- Date of birth: 25 May 1998 (age 28)
- Position: Centre-back

Team information
- Current team: Sagrada Esperança
- Number: 6

Senior career*
Years	Team	Apps	(Gls)
2015–2016	Kabuscorp		
2016–2017	Rostov	0	(0)
2017–2018	Kabuscorp		
2018–2020	Progresso do Sambizanga		
2020–2022	Interclube		
2022–	Sagrada Esperança		

International career^{‡}
2016–	Angola	7	(0)
- * Club domestic league appearances and goals as of 15:28, 9 May 2024 (UTC) ‡ National team caps and goals as of 6 October 2019

Fernando Jacinto Quissanga, known as Nandinho (born 25 May 1998) is an Angolan professional footballer who plays as a centre-back for Sagrada Esperança.

== Club career ==
On 28 November 2016, he signed a contract with the Russian Premier League club FC Rostov.

In August 2020, Nandinho signed with Interclube, joining from league rivals Progresso do Sambizanga.

== International career ==
He made his debut for the Angola national football team on 12 June 2016 in a 2016 COSAFA Cup game against Malawi. He played his first continental-level competitive game for Angola on 11 November 2016 in an Africa Cup of Nations qualifier against Madagascar.

== Personal ==
His older brother Bastos is also a professional footballer, currently with Botafogo.
