= Lami Yakini =

Congolese footballer (born 1985)

Personal information
- Full name: Lami Yakini Thili
- Date of birth: 6 June 1985 (age 41)
- Height: 1.76 m (5 ft 9 in)
- Position: Midfielder

Senior career*
Years	Team	Apps	(Gls)
2003–2004	AS Vita Club		
2005	TP Mazembe		
2006–2007	DC Motema Pembe		
2008	AS Vita Club		
2009–2019	Kabuscorp		
2019–2020	Bravos do Maquis		
2020–2022	Kabuscorp		

International career
2006–2007	DR Congo	3	(0)
- * Club domestic league appearances and goals

Lami Yakini Thili (born 6 June 1985) is a Congolese footballer who played as a midfielder. He was capped three times for DR Congo and amassed at least 194 games in the Girabola.
