= Filhão =

Angolan footballer (born 1995)

Personal information
- Full name: João Gomes de Oliveira
- Date of birth: 14 June 1995 (age 31)
- Place of birth: Luanda, Angola
- Height: 1.77 m (5 ft 9 1/2 in)
- Position: Forward

Team information
- Current team: Recreativo do Libolo
- Number: 14

Senior career*
Years	Team	Apps	(Gls)
2013–	Petro de Luanda		
2013–	→ SuperSport United (loan)	6	(0)
2014–2015	Petro de Luanda		
2015	Sporting de Cabinda (loan)		
2016	1º de Maio (loan)		
2017	Rec da Caála	9	(2)
2018	Kabuscorp	20	(3)
2019	Rec do Libolo		

International career^{‡}
2012–	Angola	3	(0)
- * Club domestic league appearances and goals as of 27 August 2018 ‡ National team caps and goals as of 10 June 2013

João Gomes de Oliveira, commonly known as Filhão (born 16 June 1995), is an Angolan professional footballer who plays as a forward for Recreativo do Libolo.

In 2018–19, he signed in for Recreativo do Libolo in Angola's premier league, the Girabola.
