= Patou Simbi Ebunga =

Congolese footballer

Personal information
- Full name: Patou Ebunga Simbi Saoulé
- Date of birth: 26 August 1983 (age 43)
- Place of birth: Kinshasa, Zaïre
- Height: 1.80 m (5 ft 11 in)
- Position: Defender

Team information
- Current team: AS Vita Club
- Number: 36

Senior career*
Years	Team	Apps	(Gls)
2003–2006	AS Mabuilu		
2007–2009	DC Motema Pembe		
2010–2015	AS Vita Club		
2015	→ Al-Hilal (loan)		
2016	AC Léopards		
2017–2019	Kabuscorp	71	(8)
2020–2024	AS Vita Club		
2024–2025	Céleste FC		
2025–	AS Vita Club	1	(0)

International career^{‡}
2010–2024	DR Congo	19	(2)
- * Club domestic league appearances and goals as of 14 June 2021 ‡ National team caps and goals as of 14 June 2021

Patou Simbi Ebunga (born 26 August 1983) is a retired Congolese football defender.

== International goals ==
#	Date	Venue	Opponent	Score	Result	Competition
1.	8 September 2013	Stade de Kégué, Lomé, Togo	Togo	1–1	1–2	2014 FIFA World Cup qualification
