= Lunguinha =

Angolan footballer (born 1986)

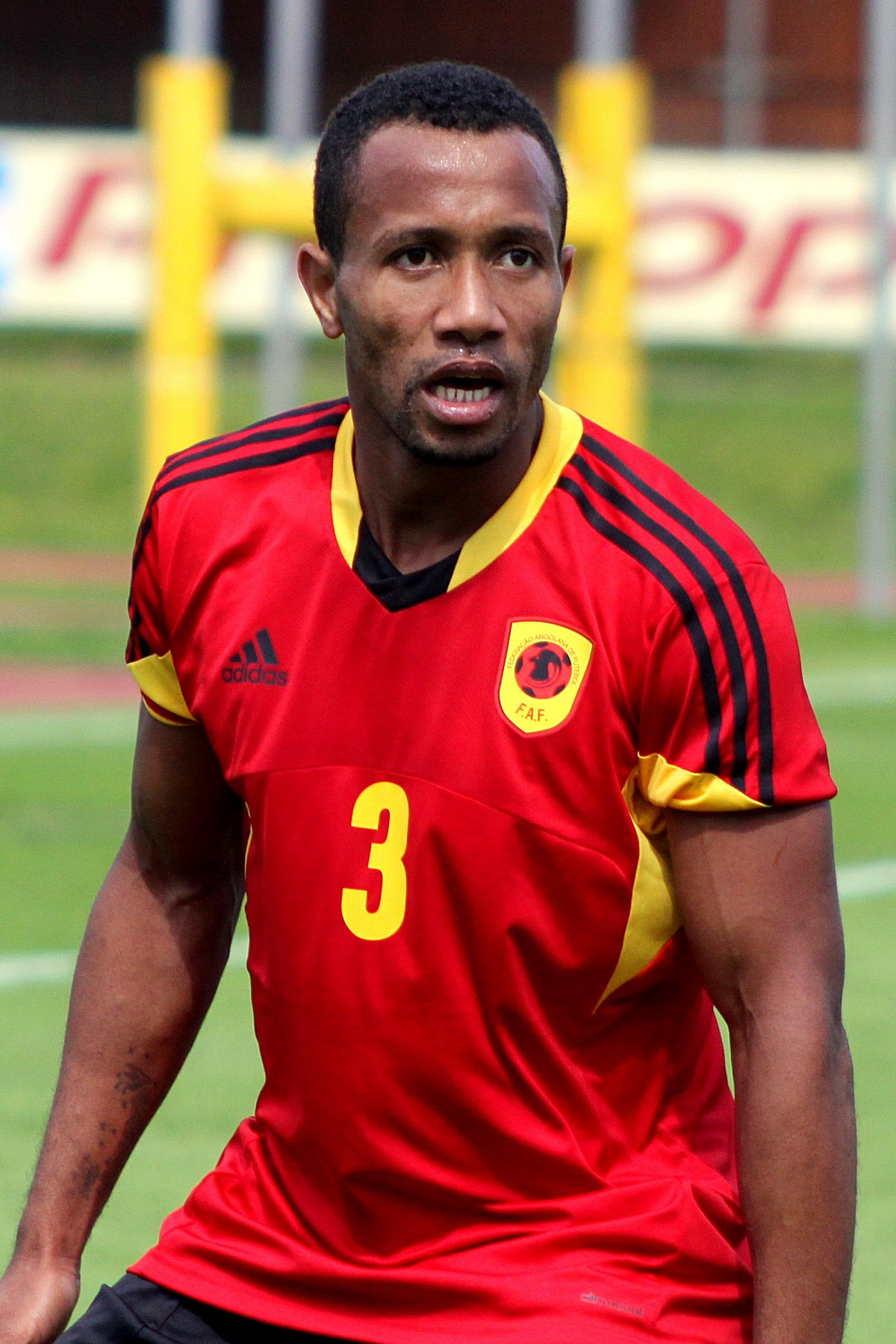
- Lunguinha playing for Angola in 2014

Personal information
- Full name: António Luís dos Santos Serrado
- Date of birth: 16 January 1986 (age 40)
- Place of birth: Huambo, Angola
- Height: 1.89 m (6 ft 2 in)
- Position: Defender

Team information
- Current team: Kabuscorp

Senior career*
Years	Team	Apps	(Gls)
2004	Académica Lobito		
2005	Benfica do Huambo		
2006	Atlético Namibe		
2007	Petro de Luanda		
2008	Petro do Huambo		
2009–2010	1º de Maio		
2014–2015	Kabuscorp		
2016–2017	Progresso		
2018–	Kabuscorp	4	(0)

International career^{‡}
2012–	Angola	17	(0)
- * Club domestic league appearances and goals as of 29 August 2018 ‡ National team caps and goals as of 25 January 2013

António Luís dos Santos Serrado aka Lunguinha, is an Angolan footballer who plays as a defender for Kabuscorp.
