= Amaro (Angolan footballer) =

Angolan footballer

Personal information
- Full name: Amândio Manuel Filipe da Costa
- Date of birth: 12 November 1986 (age 39)
- Position: Defender

Team information
- Current team: Kabuscorp
- Number: 20

Senior career*
Years	Team	Apps	(Gls)
2006–2010	Benfica de Luanda		
2011–	Primeiro de Agosto		
2015–	Benfica de Luanda		
2017–	Kabuscorp	18	(4)
2020–	Bravos do Maquis		

International career^{‡}
2008–	Angola	41	(2)
Medal record
Men's football
Representing Angola
African Nations Championship
Runner-up	2011 Sudan
- * Club domestic league appearances and goals as of 29 August 2018 ‡ National team caps and goals as of 6 July 2016

Amândio Manuel Filipe da Costa best known as Amaro (born 12 November 1986) is an Angolan footballer who plays for FC Bravos do Maquis as a midfielder in the Angolan premier league Girabola.

== Club career ==
Amaro played for Benfica de Luanda between 2006 and 2010, before joining Primeiro de Agosto in 2011.

In 2017, he signed to Kabuscorp.

In 2019–20, he signed to Bravos do Maquis in the Angolan league, the Girabola.

== International career ==
Amaro also has been capped by the Angola national team with his debut appearance in 2008.

=== International goals ===
Scores and results list Angola's goal tally first.

Goal #	Date	Venue	Opponent	Score	Result	Competition
1.	15 December 2012	Estádio Nacional de Ombaka, Benguela, Angola	Gambia	1–1	1–1	Friendly match
2.	23 March 2013	Stade du 28 Septembre, Conakry, Guinea	Senegal	1–1	1–1	2014 FIFA World Cup qual.
Correct as of 9 March 2017

== Honours ==
Angola

- African Nations Championship: runner-up 2011
