= Arouna Dang Bissene =

Cameroonian footballer

Dang Bissene
Personal information
- Full name: Arouna Dang À Bissene
- Date of birth: 22 April 1993 (age 33)
- Place of birth: Yaoundé, Cameroon
- Height: 1.88 m (6 ft 2 in)
- Position: Forward

Team information
- Current team: Bamboutos

Youth career
- CSYB de Yaoundé

Senior career*
| Years | Team | Apps | (Gls) |
| 2013–2014 | Krka | 4 | (0) |
| 2014–2015 | Bamboutos | 23 | (12) |
| 2015–2016 | UMS de Loum | 30 | (19) |
| 2017 | Huracán | 0 | (0) |
| 2018 | Kabuscorp Palanca | 29 | (20) |
| 2019 | CS Constantine | 5 | (0) |
| 2019– | Bamboutos | | |
- * Club domestic league appearances and goals as of 21:48, 11 July 2019 (UTC)

Arouna Dang À Bissene (born 22 April 1993), known as Arouna Dang Bissene or Dang Bissene, is a Cameroonian professional footballer who plays as a midfielder for Bamboutos FC.

His brother, Moustapha Ngae A-Bissene, is also a footballer.
