= 2018–19 Atlético Petróleos de Luanda season =

Atlético Petróleos de Luanda
2018–19 season
- President: Tomás Faria
- Manager: Beto Bianchi (Jan 2016–Mar 2019); Toni Cosano (Mar 2019–)
- Stadium: Estádio 11 de Novembro
- Girabola: 2nd
- CAF Confederation Cup: Group stage
- Angola Cup: Semi-finals
- Top goalscorer: League: Azulão (11); All: Azulão (16)
- Biggest win: Petro 4–0 Orapa Utd (27 Nov 2018)
- Biggest defeat: Petro 0–2 Maquis (26 Dec 2018)
Home colours	Away colours
- All statistics correct as of 6 March 2019.

The 2018–19 season of Atlético Petróleos de Luanda is the club's 38th season in the Girabola, the Angolan Premier football League and 38th consecutive season in the top flight of Angolan football. In 2019, the club is participating in the Girabola, the Angola Cup and the CAF Confederation Cup.

== Squad information ==
=== Players ===
No.	Nat	Nick	Name	Pos	Date of birth (age)
Goalkeepers
12	(Angola)	Elber	Jorge Mota Faial Delgado	–	24 June 1991 (aged 28)
22	(Angola)	Gerson	Gerson Bruno da Costa Barros	–	1 April 1987 (aged 32)
Defenders
2	(Angola)	Mira	Daniel João Zongo Macuenho	RB	12 February 1991 (aged 28)
3	(Angola)	Ary	Ariclene Assunção Oliveira	LB	6 August 1992 (aged 27)
5	(Angola)	Élio	Élio Wilson Costa Martins	CM	20 December 1987 (aged 32)
13	(Angola)	Tó Carneiro	Augusto de Jesus Corte-Real Carneiro	LB	5 November 1995 (aged 24)
15	(Angola)	Wilson	Wilson Pinto Gaspar	CB	29 September 1990 (aged 29)
25	(Angola)	Eddie	Eddie Marcos Melo Afonso	LB	7 March 1994 (aged 25)
29	(Angola)	Danilson	Daniel José Kilola	CB	6 July 1999 (aged 20)
Midfielders
6	(Angola)	Tresor	Tresor Stanislau de Sousa	CM	10 February 1993 (aged 26)
7	(Angola)	Diógenes	Diógenes Capemba João	CM	1 January 1997 (aged 22)
8	(Angola)	Carlinhos	Carlos Sténio do Carmo	–	19 March 1995 (aged 24)
11	(Angola)	Job	Ricardo Job Estévão	RW	27 September 1987 (aged 32)
14	(Angola)	Mateus	Mateus Gaspar Domingos	RW	20 August 1993 (aged 26)
16	(Angola)	Benvindo	Benvindo Miguel André Afonso	MF	10 October 2001 (aged 18)
18	(Angola)	Herenilson	Herenilson Caifalo do Carmo	CM	23 May 1996 (aged 23)
19	(Brazil)	Tony	António Rosa Ribeiro	MF	6 October 1992 (aged 27)
20	(Angola)	Além	Alberto Adão Campos Miguel	DM	6 December 1997 (aged 22)
21	(Angola)	Caranga	Jorge Mendes Corte-Real Carneiro	MF	1 January 1992 (aged 27)
23	(Angola)	Nari	Bráulio Adélio de Olim Diniz	LW	30 April 1987 (aged 32)
24	(Angola)	Pedro	Pedro Domingos Agostinho	MF	30 July 2000 (aged 19)
Forwards
9	(Nigeria)	Dennis	Dennis Sesugh	MF	11 August 1995 (aged 24)
26	(Brazil)	Azulão	Tiago Lima Leal	MF	26 March 1988 (aged 31)
28	(Angola)	Vá	Vladimiro Edson António Félix	MF	24 August 1998 (aged 21)

=== Pre-season transfers ===
No.	Nat	Nick	Name	Pos	Date of Birth (Age)	
Transfers out To
20	(Brazil)	Diney	Valdisney Costa dos Santos	MF	2 March 1991 (aged 28)	Villa Nova Atlético
21	(Angola)	Francis	Francisco Marta Agostinho da Rosa	RB	15 August 1993 (aged 26)	Sagrada Esperança
1	(Angola)	Lamá	Luís Maimona João	GK	1 February 1980 (aged 39)	Career end
4	(Angola)	Maludi	Maludi Francisco Caxala	CB	12 June 1993 (aged 26)	Desportivo Huíla
17	(Angola)	Nandinho	Fernando Bumba Mendes	MF	29 December 1994 (aged 25)	Desportivo Huíla
Transfers in From
20	(Angola)	Além	Alberto Adão Campos Miguel	DM	6 December 1997 (aged 22)	Progresso Sambizanga
21	(Angola)	Caranga	Jorge Mendes Corte-Real Carneiro	LW	1 January 1992 (aged 27)	Interclube
12	(Angola)	Elber	Jorge Mota Faial Delgado	GK	24 June 1991 (aged 28)	Kabuscorp
17	(Ghana)	Mensah	Isaac Mensah	CB	13 December 1995 (aged 24)	Hearts of Oak
4	(Ghana)	Musah	Musah Inusah	CB	1 February 1994 (aged 25)	Hearts of Oak
23	(Angola)	Nari	Bráulio Adélio de Olim Diniz	LW	30 April 1987 (aged 32)	Kabuscorp
13	(Angola)	Tó Carneiro	Augusto de Jesus Corte-Real Carneiro	LB	5 November 1995 (aged 24)	Interclube
28	(Angola)	Vá	Vladimiro Edson António Félix	FW	24 August 1998 (aged 21)	Leixões

=== Mid-season transfers ===
No.	Nat	Nick	Name	Pos	Date of Birth (Age)	
Transfers out To
6	(Angola)	Tresor	Tresor Stanislau de Sousa	MF	10 February 1993 (aged 26)	Kabuscorp
9	(Nigeria)	Dennis	Dennis Sesugh	FW	11 August 1995 (aged 24)	–
Transfers in From
6	(Angola)	Megue	Miguel Alexandre G. Manuel	MF	–	Progresso do Sambizanga

=== Staff ===
Nat	Name	Position(s)	Date of birth (age)	Remark
Technical staff
(Brazil)	Beto Bianchi	Head coach	6 November 1966 (aged 53)	Released in midseason
(Spain)	Toni Cosano	Head coach	28 March 1977 (aged 42)	Joined in midseason
(Angola)	Flávio Amado	Assistant coach	30 December 1979 (aged 40)	
(Angola)	João Ndoce	Assistant coach	–	
(Brazil)	Adriano Soares	Goalkeeper coach	–	Released in midseason
Medical
(Angola)	Nelson Bolivar	Physician	–	
(Brazil)	Maurício Marques	Physio	–	
(Angola)	Ramiro José	Masseur	–	
Management
(Angola)	Tomás Faria	Chairman	–	
(Angola)	Chico Afonso	Vice-Chairman	–	
(Angola)	Sidónio Malamba	Head of Foot Dept	–	

== Overview ==
Competition	First match	Last match	Final position	Record							
Competition	First match	Last match	Final position	Pld	W	D	L	GF	GA	GD	Win %
Girabola	28 October 2018	19 May 2019	Runner-up	30	19	7	4	40	15	+25	63.33
Angola Cup	8 May 2019	22 May 2019	Semi-finals	3	2	0	1	3	1	+2	66.67
CAF Confederation Cup	28 November 2018	5 December 2018	Group stage	12	7	2	3	17	8	+9	58.33
Total				45	28	9	8	60	24	+36	62.22

Last updated: 22 May 2018

== Angolan League ==
=== League table ===
Pos	Team	Pld	W	D	L	GF	GA	GD	Pts	Qualification or relegation (Note: No teams enter the Confederation Cup. Desportivo da Huíla are Angola Cup runners-up (Primeiro de Agosto are cup winners) but declined to participate, while Kabuscorp were relegated and thus not eligible.)
1	Primeiro de Agosto (Note: Primeiro de Agosto and Desportivo da Huíla forfeited 3 points on suspicion of match-fixing on the 17th round match.) (C)	30	20	10	0	51	9	+42	67	Qualification for Champions League
2	Petro de Luanda	30	19	7	4	40	15	+25	64	Qualification for Champions League
3	Desportivo da Huíla	30	15	8	7	36	25	+11	50	
4	Kabuscorp (Note: Kabuscorp had forfeited 9 points as a result of payment default. On appeal, after the plaintiffs dropped their claims, all points were restored. Regarding their dispute with former player Rivaldo, the club was ordered to be relegated by FIFA for failing to pay the outstanding debt within the established deadline.) (R)	30	13	10	7	35	26	+9	49	Relegation to Provincial stages
5	Interclube	30	11	11	8	27	22	+5	44	

Source: Girabola.com
Rules for classification: 1) Points; 2) Head-to-head points; 3) Goal difference; 4) Head-to-head goal difference; 5) Goals scored; 6) Fair-play points; 7) Play-off.
(C) Champions; (R) Relegated

=== Results ===
==== Results summary ====
Overall								Home						Away					
Pld	W	D	L	GF	GA	GD	Pts	W	D	L	GF	GA	GD	W	D	L	GF	GA	GD
30	19	7	4	40	15	+25	64	13	1	1	25	5	+20	6	6	3	15	10	+5

Last updated: 19 May 2019.

==== Results by round ====
Round	1	2	3	4	5	6	7	8	9	10	11	12	13	14	15	16	17	18	19	20	21	22	23	24	25	26	27	28	29	30
Ground	A	H	H	A	H	A	H	A	H	A	H	H	H	A	H	H	A	A	H	A	H	A	H	A	H	A	A	A	H	A
Result	D	W	W	D	W	D	L	L	W	W	W	D	W	W	W	W	W	W	W	L	W	D	D	W	W	L	W	W	W	D
Position	11	2	3	3	2	2	3	5	4	3	2	2	2	2	2	2	1	1	1	2	2	2	2	2	2	2	2	2	2	2

Updated to match(es) played on 19 May 2019. Source: girabolazap.co.ao
A = Away; H = Home; W = Win; D = Draw; L = Loss

==== Results overview ====
Win Draw Loss

Team	Home score	Away score
Recreativo do Libolo	2–1	0-0
Cuando Cubango FC	3–1	1–0
Saurimo FC	1–0	2–0
Sporting de Cabinda	1–0	1-1
Recreativo da Caála	2–0	1-2
Sagrada Esperança	2–0	0-0
Bravos do Maquis	0-2	1-1
1º de Agosto	0-0	0-1
Kabuscorp	2–0	4–1
Interclube	1–0	1–0
Desportivo da Huíla	1–0	0-2
ASA	3–0	0-0
Santa Rita de Cássia	3–1	1–0
Académica do Lobito	1–0	2–1
Progresso do Sambizanga	3–0	1-1

=== Match details ===
Sun, 28 Oct 2018 01	Rec do Libolo	0–0	Petro Atlético	Estádio Municipal, Calulo
15:00 WAT (UTC+1)				Referee: António Dungula; Manuel Benguela, Tito Pena
Note: Gerson / Élio, Mira, Tó, Wilson / Além, Caranga, Carlinhos (substituted off) 83', Herenilson, Job (c) (substituted off) 90+3' / Azulão — Tony (substituted on) 83', Eddie (substituted on) 90+3'

Sat, 03 Nov 2018 02	Petro Atlético	3–1	Cuando Cubango FC	11 de Novembro, Luanda
17:30 WAT (UTC+1)	Job 6'; Vá 28'; Tony 82'	Report	20' (o.g.) Tó Carneiro	Referee: José Álvaro; Estanislau Guedes, Rosário Calembela
Note: Gerson / Élio (substituted off) 46', Mira, Tó, Wilson / Além, Caranga (substituted off) 54', Herenilson, Job (c) / Azulão, Vá (substituted off) 69' — Diógenes (substituted on) 46', Carlinhos (substituted on) 54', Tony (substituted on) 69'

Sun, 11 Nov 2018 04	Sporting Cabinda	1–1	Petro Atlético	Tafe, Cabinda
15:00 WAT (UTC+1)	Shoma 9'		62' (pen.) Azulão	Referee: Miguel Mateus; Celestino Golombole, Celso António
Note: Gerson / Eddie, Nari, Tó (substituted off) 46', Wilson / Além, Herenilson, Tony (substituted off) 75', Tresor (substituted off) 35' / Azulão, Vá — Dennis (substituted on) 35', Mateus (substituted on) 46', Carlinhos (substituted on) 75'

Thu, 22 Nov 2018 03	Petro Atlético	1–0	Saurimo FC	11 de Novembro, Luanda
16:00 WAT (UTC+1)	Vá 65'	Report		Referee: Paulo Sérgio; Segunda Tchisseque, Lídio Coimbra
Note: Gerson / Danilson, Eddie, Tó, Wilson / Além, Benvindo (substituted off) 46', Herenilson, Job (c) (substituted off) 85' / Azulão, Vá (substituted off) 72' — Mateus (substituted on) 46', Carlinhos (substituted on) 72', Caranga (substituted on) 85'

Sun, 09 Dec 2018 05	Petro Atlético	2–0	Rec da Caála	11 de Novembro, Luanda
16:00 WAT (UTC+1)	Azulão 39', 58'	Report		Referee: Nuno Eduardo; Nilton Armando, Manuel Benguela
Note: Gerson / Ary (substituted off) 76', Danilson, Eddie, Wilson / Além, Herenilson, Job (c) (substituted off) 67', Mateus (substituted off) 83' / Azulão, Vá — Tony (substituted on) 67', Diógenes (substituted on) 76', Caranga (substituted on) 83'

Wed, 26 Dec 2018 07	Petro Atlético	0–2	Bravos Maquis	11 de Novembro, Luanda
17:30 WAT (UTC+1)		Report	18' Mussumari; 52' Chico	Referee: Bernardo Nangolo; Jerson Emiliano, Wilson Ntyamba
Note: Gerson / Diógenes, Élio (substituted off) 45', Tó (substituted off) 57', Wilson / Danilson, Herenilson, Job (c), Mateus / Azulão, Dennis (substituted off) 46' — Benvindo (substituted on) 45', Caranga (substituted on) 46', Tony (substituted on) 57'

Sun, 30 Dec 2018 09	Petro Atlético	2–0	Kabuscorp	11 de Novembro, Luanda
17:30 WAT (UTC+1)	Tony 34'; Vá 58'	Report		Referee: Feliciano Lucas; José Felix, Dário Gaspar
Note: Gerson / Danilson, Diógenes, Eddie, Wilson / Além, Herenilson, Job (c) (substituted off) 84', Tony / Azulão (substituted off) 90+4', Vá (substituted off) 78' — Caranga (substituted on) 78', Manguxi (substituted on) 84', Nari (substituted on) 90+4'

Sat, 05 Jan 2019 10	Interclube	0–1	Petro Atlético	22 de Junho, Luanda
15:30 WAT (UTC+1)			13' Job	Referee: Ailton Carmelino; Ivanildo Lopes, Evanildo Martins
Note: Gerson / Danilson, Diógenes, Eddie, Élio / Além, Caranga (substituted off) 66', Herenilson, Job (c) / Tony (substituted off) 78', Vá (substituted off) 87' — Benvindo (substituted on) 66', Manguxi (substituted on) 78', Carlinhos (substituted on) 87'

Fri, 15 Jan 2019 12	ASA	0–0	Petro Atlético	Coqueiros, Luanda
15:00 WAT (UTC+1)		Report		Referee: Benjamin Andrade; Bernabé Ngulo, Nilton Armando
Note: Gerson / Élio, Nari, Mira, Tó / Caranga (substituted off) 46', Carlinhos (substituted off) 78', Manguxi (substituted off) 64' (c), Mateus, Tresor / Tony — Vá (substituted on) 46', Além (substituted on) 64', Benvindo (substituted on) 78'

Wed, 23 Jan 2019 13	Petro Atlético	3–1	S^{ta} Rita de Cássia	11 de Novembro, Luanda
15:00 WAT (UTC+1)	Azulão 52', 66'; 70' Vá	Report	48' Foguinho	Referee: Tânia Duarte; Luísa Luhaco, Andália Jeremias
Note: Gerson / Danilson, Diógenes, Eddie, Wilson (c) / Carlinhos, Mateus, Pedro (substituted off) 42', Tony / Azulão (substituted off) 88', Vá (substituted off) 84' — Caranga (substituted on) 42', Manguxi (substituted on) 84', Benvindo (substituted on) 88'

Sat, 26 Jan 2019 14	Académica	1–2	Petro Atlético	Ombaka, Benguela
15:00 WAT (UTC+1)	Cristiano 45'		11' Carlinhos; 33' Mateus	Referee: Rodrigues Aleixo; Nicodemos Calembela, Francisco Van-Dúnem
Note: Gerson / Danilson, Diógenes, Eddie, Wilson / Carlinhos (substituted off) 90', Herenilson, Job (c) (substituted off) 59', Mateus (substituted off) 75' / Azulão, Vá (substituted off) 84' — Manguxi (substituted on) 59', Caranga (substituted on) 75', Benvindo (substituted on) 90'

Tue, 29 Jan 2019 15	Petro Atlético	3–0	Progresso	11 de Novembro, Luanda
16:00 WAT (UTC+1)	Tony 68', 75', 81'	Report		Referee: José Chitumba; Estanislau Guedes, Ivanildo Lopes
Note: Gerson / Danilson, Diógenes, Eddie, Wilson / Carlinhos (substituted off) 46', Herenilson, Job (c), Pedro (substituted off) 60' / Azulão (substituted off) 88', Vá — Tony (substituted on) 46', Manguxi (substituted on) 60', Caranga (substituted on) 88'

Sat, 09 Feb 2019 08	1º de Agosto	1–0	Petro Atlético	11 de Novembro, Luanda
16:00 WAT (UTC+1)	Dani 38'	Report		Referee: João Goma; Jerson Emiliano, Ivanildo Lopes
Note: Gerson / Danilson, Diógenes, Eddie, Wilson / Herenilson, Job (c) (substituted off) 80', Manguxi (substituted off) 75', Tony (substituted off) 90+2' / Azulão, Vá — Carlinhos (substituted on) 75', Mateus (substituted on) 80', Caranga (substituted on) 90+2'

Sat, 16 Feb 2019 11	Petro Atlético	1–0	Desportivo Huíla	11 de Novembro, Luanda
16:00 WAT (UTC+1)	Azulão 19'	Report		Referee: António Caxala; Júlio Lemos, Joaquim Rocha
Note: Elber / Danilson, Diógenes, Nari, Wilson / Eddie, Job (c) (substituted off) 65', Manguxi (substituted off) 83', Tony (substituted off) 76' / Azulão, Vá — Herenilson (substituted on) 65', Mateus (substituted on) 76', Caranga (substituted on) 83'

Wed, 20 Feb 2019 06	Sagrada	0–0	Petro Atlético	Sagrada Esperança, Dundo
15:00 WAT (UTC+1)		Report		Referee: António Dungula; Evanildo Martins, Ivanildo Lopes
Note: Elber / Danilson, Diógenes, Nari, Wilson / Eddie, Herenilson, Job (c) (substituted off) 68', Manguxi (substituted off) 46' / Tony (substituted off) 59', Vá — Mateus (substituted on) 46', Azulão (substituted on) 59', Carlinhos (substituted on) 68'

Wed, 06 Mar 2019 17	Cuando Cubango FC	0–1	Petro Atlético	Municipal, Menongue
15:00 WAT (UTC+1)		Report	52' Tony	Referee: Chitano Francisco; Wilson Ntyamba, Andália Jeremias
Note: Elber / Danilson, Eddie, Nari, Tó / Além (substituted off) 46', Herenilson, Mateus (substituted off) 50', Tony (substituted off) 75' / Azulão (c), Vá — Manguxi (substituted on) 46', Job (substituted on) 50', Benvindo (substituted on) 75'

Tue, 13 Mar 2019 19	Petro Atlético	1–0	Sporting Cabinda	11 de Novembro, Luanda
17:45 WAT (UTC+1)	Carlinhos 33'			Referee: Bernardo Nangolo; António Livongue, Pedro Alberto
Note: Elber / Mira, Musah, Nari, Tó / Além, Carlinhos, Manguxi (substituted off) 90+1', Mateus / Job (c) (substituted off) 62', Vá — Tony (substituted on) 62', Megue (substituted on) 75', Pedro (substituted on) 90+1'

Wed, 27 Mar 2019 20	Rec da Caála	2–1	Petro Atlético	Mártires da Canhala, Caála
15:00 WAT (UTC+1)	Paizinho 34', 36'	Report	55' Azulão	Referee: José Maxia; Cláudio Vunge, Flávio Dias
Note: Elber / Eddie, Musah, Tó (substituted off) 77', Wilson / Herenilson, Job (c), Manguxi (substituted off) 89', Tony / Azulão, Vá (substituted off) 85' — Mateus (substituted on) 77', Mensah (substituted on) 85', Carlinhos (substituted on) 89'

Sat, 30 Mar 2019 21	Petro Atlético	2–0	Sagrada	11 de Novembro, Luanda
16:00 WAT (UTC+1)	Job 16'; Vá 20'	Report		Referee: Nuno Eduardo; Manuel Benguela, Nilton Armando
Note: Elber / Danilson, Eddie, Tó, Wilson / Herenilson, Job (c) (substituted off) 79', Manguxi (substituted off) 72', Mateus / Azulão, Vá (substituted off) 46' — Além (substituted on) 46', Carlinhos (substituted on) 72', Tony (substituted on) 79'

Wed, 03 Apr 2019 22	Bravos Maquis	1–1	Petro Atlético	Mundunduleno, Luena
15:00 WAT (UTC+1)	Careca 45+2'	Report	38' Wilson	Referee: António Caxala; Júlio Lemos, Luís Mateus
Note: Elber / Danilson, Diógenes, Tó, Wilson / Caranga, Herenilson, Job (c), Manguxi (substituted off) 83' / Azulão, Tony (substituted off) 75' — Mateus (substituted on) 75', Além (substituted on) 83'

Sun, 07 Apr 2019 23	Petro Atlético	0–0	1º de Agosto	11 de Novembro, Luanda
16:00 WAT (UTC+1)		Report		Referee: Hélder Martins; Jerson Emiliano, Ivanildo Lopes
Note: Elber / Danilson, Eddie, Tó, Wilson / Caranga (substituted off) 71', Herenilson, Job (c), Manguxi (substituted off) 77' / Azulão, Tony — Mateus (substituted on) 71', Além (substituted on) 77', Mensah (substituted on) 86'

Wed, 10 Apr 2019 16	Petro Atlético	2–1	Rec do Libolo	11 de Novembro, Luanda
16:00 WAT (UTC+1)	Azulão 65'; Caranga 67'		59' Avelino	Referee: Paulo Sérgio; Segunda Tchisseque, Ilídio Coimbra
Note: Elber / Eddie, Nari, Tó, Wilson (c) / Caranga, Herenilson, Manguxi (substituted off) 58', Mensah (substituted off) 57' / Azulão, Tony — Job (substituted on) 57', Além (substituted on) 58'

Sat, 13 Apr 2019 24	Kabuscorp	1–4	Petro Atlético	11 de Novembro, Luanda
17:30 WAT (UTC+1)	Dany 78'	Report	6', 18', 37' Azulão; 90+5' Mateus	Referee: Benjamin Andrade; Judith Mestre, Nilton Armando
Note: Elber / Eddie, Nari, Tó, Wilson / Além, Caranga (substituted off) 85', Herenilson, Job (c) (substituted off) 73' / Azulão, Tony (substituted off) 61' — Mensah (substituted on) 61', Mateus (substituted on) 73', Manguxi (substituted on) 85'

Wed, 17 Apr 2019 25	Petro Atlético	1–0	Interclube	11 de Novembro, Luanda
16:00 WAT (UTC+1)	Manguxi 87'	Report		Referee: Feliciano Lucas; Horácio Tchissingui, Alexandre Bengue
Note: Elber / Danilson, Eddie, Tó, Wilson / Além (substituted off) 74', Caranga, Herenilson, Job (c) (substituted off) 46' / Azulão, Tony (substituted off) 59' — Mensah (substituted on) 46', Mateus (substituted on) 59', Manguxi (substituted on) 74'

Sun, 21 Apr 2019 26	Desportivo Huíla	2–0	Petro Atlético	Estádio do Ferrovia, Lubango
15:00 WAT (UTC+1)	Lionel 27', 90+3'	Report		Referee: António Dungula; Tito Capingala, José Siliya
Note: Elber / Danilson, Diógenes, Eddie, Wilson / Além (substituted off) 81', Caranga (substituted off) 61', Herenilson (substituted off) 62', Job (c) / Azulão, Tony — Mateus (substituted on) 61', Manguxi (substituted on) 62', Carlinhos (substituted on) 81'

Wed, 24 Apr 2019 27	Petro Atlético	3–0	ASA	11 de Novembro, Luanda
17:30 WAT (UTC+1)	Tony 41' (pen.), 56'; Manguxi 43'			Referee: Airton Carmelino; Ivanildo Lopes, Evanildo Martins
Note: Elber / Eddie, Musah, Tó, Wilson (c) / Além (substituted off) 66', Caranga, Herenilson (substituted off) 80', Manguxi, Mateus (substituted off) 73' / Tony — Megue (substituted on) 66', Job (substituted on) 73', Nari (substituted on) 80'

Sat, 27 Apr 2019 28	S^{ta} Rita de Cássia	0–1	Petro Atlético	4 de Janeiro, Uíge
15:00 WAT (UTC+1)		Report	6' Tony	Referee: João Goma; José Felix, Dário Gaspar
Note: Elber / Eddie, Musah, Tó, Wilson (c) / Caranga, Herenilson, Manguxi, Mateus (substituted off) 66' / Azulão (substituted off) 90+2', Tony (substituted off) 82' — Job (substituted on) 66', Nari (substituted on) 82', Diógenes (substituted on) 90+2'

Wed, 01 May 2019 18	Saurimo FC	0–2	Petro Atlético	Mangueiras, Saurimo
15:00 WAT (UTC+1)		Report	60' Job; 90+4' Herenilson	Referee: Mauro de Oliveira; Domingos Francisco, Nery Silva
Note: Elber / Eddie, Musah (substituted off) 42', Tó, Wilson / Herenilson, Manguxi, Mateus (substituted off) 69', Job (c) (substituted off) 85' / Azulão, Tony — Nari (substituted on) 42', Diógenes (substituted on) 69', Ary (substituted on) 85'

Sun, 12 May 2019 29	Petro Atlético	1–0	Académica	11 de Novembro, Luanda
15:00 WAT (UTC+1)	Azulão 37'	Report		Referee: José Chitumba; Estanislau Guedes, Jeremias Cafussa
Note: Elber / Danilson, Diógenes, Élio, Tó / Caranga (substituted off) 67', Herenilson (substituted off) 60', Manguxi, Job (c) / Azulão, Tony (substituted off) 78' — Além (substituted on) 60', Mensah (substituted on) 67', Megue (substituted on) 78'

Sun, 19 May 2019 30	Progresso	1–1	Petro Atlético	Coqueiros, Luanda
15:00 WAT (UTC+1)	Chiló 49'	Report	32' Azulão	Referee: João Goma; José Felix, Dário Gaspar
Note: Elber / Danilson, Eddie, Musah, Tó / Caranga (substituted off) 63', Herenilson, Manguxi, Job (c) (substituted off) 67' / Azulão, Tony (substituted off) 81' — Mateus (substituted on) 63', Diógenes (substituted on) 67', Mensah (substituted on) 81'

== CAF Confederation Cup ==
=== Group stage ===
Pos	Team	Pld	W	D	L	GF	GA	GD	Pts	Qualification
1	(Egypt) Zamalek	6	2	3	1	9	6	+3	9 (Note: Head-to-head goal difference: Zamalek +2, Gor Mahia –2.)	Quarter-finals
2	(Kenya) Gor Mahia	6	3	0	3	8	9	−1	9	Quarter-finals
3	(Algeria) NA Hussein Dey	6	2	2	2	4	6	−2	8	
4	(Angola) Petro de Luanda	6	2	1	3	6	6	0	7	

Source: CAF
Rules for classification: Group stage tiebreakers
Notes:

Sun, 17 Mar 2019 GD R3 2L	Gor Mahia (Kenya)	1–0	(Angola) Petro Atlético	City Stadium, Nairobi
19:00 EAT (UTC+3)	Tuyisenge 57' (pen.)			Referee: Rédouane Jiyed; Hicham Abbou, Yahya Nouali (Morocco)
Note: Elber / Danilson, Eddie, Tó (substituted off) 72', Wilson / Além, Herenilson, Job (c), Manguxi (substituted off) 60' / Azulão, Vá (substituted off) — Tony (substituted on) , Carlinhos (substituted on) 60', Mateus (substituted on) 72'

Sun, 10 Mar 2019 GD R2 2L	Petro Atlético (Angola)	2–0	(Algeria) Hussein Dey	11 de Novembro, Luanda
14:00 WAT (UTC+1)	Job 15'; Azulão 38' (pen.)	Report		Referee: Bernard Camille; Hensley Petrousse, James Emile (Seychelles)
Note: Elber / Danilson, Eddie, Tó, Wilson / Herenilson, Job (c), Manguxi (substituted off) 70', Tony (substituted off) 78' / Azulão, Vá (substituted off) 82' — Além (substituted on) 70', Mateus (substituted on) 78', Carlinhos (substituted on) 82'

Sun, 03 Mar 2019 GD R1 2L	Petro Atlético (Angola)	0–1	(Egypt) Zamalek	11 de Novembro, Luanda
17:00 WAT (UTC+1)		Report	26' Ahaddad	Referee: Pacifique Ndabihawenimana; Gustave Baguma, Willy Habimana (Burundi)
Note: Elber / Danilson, Diógenes, Eddie, Wilson / Além (substituted off) 46', Herenilson, Job (c) (substituted off) 85', Manguxi / Azulão, Tony — Mateus (substituted on) 46', Benvindo (substituted on) 85'

Sun, 24 Feb 2019 GD R3 1L	Zamalek (Egypt)	1–1	(Angola) Petro Atlético	Borg El Arab, Alexandria
21:00 EET (UTC+2)	Obama 90+3'	Report	58' Azulão	Referee: Beida Dahane; Cheikh Pene, Ismaile Diallo (Mauritania)
Note: Elber / Danilson, Diógenes, Tó, Wilson / Eddie, Herenilson, Job (c) (substituted off) 56', Manguxi / Azulão (substituted off) 77', Vá (substituted off) 90' — Tony (substituted on) 56', Nari (substituted on) 77', Caranga (substituted on) 90'

Wed, 13 Feb 2019 GD R2 1L	Petro Atlético (Angola)	2–1	(Kenya) Gor Mahia	11 de Novembro, Luanda
17:00 WAT (UTC+1)	Manguxi 12'; Tony 37'	Report	90' Kipkirui	Referee: Tsegay Teklu; Berhe Tesfagiorghis, Suleiman Salih (Eritrea)
Note: Elber / Danilson, Diógenes, Nari (substituted off) 89', Wilson / Eddie, Job (c), Manguxi, Mateus (substituted off) 80' / Azulão, Tony (substituted off) 64' — Carlinhos (substituted on) 64', Caranga (substituted on) 80', Élio (substituted on) 89'

Sun, 03 Feb 2019 GD R1 1L	Hussein Dey (Algeria)	2–1	(Angola) Petro Atlético	5 Juillet, Algiers
20:00 CET (UTC+1)	Tougai 18'; Alati 53'	Report	75' Vá	Referee: Mohamed El Fadil; Mohammed Ibrahim, Omer Ahmed (Sudan)
Note: Gerson / Danilson, Diógenes, Eddie, Wilson / Caranga (substituted off) 59', Herenilson, Pedro (substituted off) 86', Tó (substituted off) 38' / Azulão, Vá — Tony (substituted on) 38', Mateus (substituted on) 59', Benvindo (substituted on) 86'

=== Playoff round ===
Sat, 19 Jan 2019 PO 2L	Petro Atlético (Angola)	2–1	(Mali) Stade Malien	11 de Novembro, Luanda
16:00 WAT (UTC+1)	Azulão 34'; Vá 80'	Report	90+3' Keita	Referee: Issa Sy; El Hadji Gueye, Amadou Ngom (Senegal)
Note: Gerson / Danilson, Diógenes, Eddie, Wilson / Além, Herenilson, Job (c) / Azulão (substituted off) 83', Tony (substituted off) 77', Vá — Carlinhos (substituted on) 77', Caranga (substituted on) 83'

Sat, 12 Jan 2019 PO 1L	Stade Malien (Mali)	1–1	(Angola) Petro Atlético	Modibo Kéïta, Bamako
16:00 UTC (UTC+0)	Sylla 23'	Report	32' Vá	Referee: Ring Malong; George Olibo, Gasim Dehiya (South Sudan)
Note: Gerson / Danilson, Diógenes, Eddie, Wilson / Além, Herenilson, Job (c) (substituted off) 90', Mateus (substituted off) 77' / Tony (substituted off) 78', Vá — Caranga (substituted on) 77', Azulão (substituted on) 78', Carlinhos (substituted on) 90'

=== First round ===
Fri, 21 Dec 2018 R1 2L	Petro Atlético (Angola)	1–0	(Democratic Republic of the Congo) AS Nyuki	11 de Novembro, Luanda
16:00 WAT (UTC+1)	Azulão 65'	Report		Referee: Celso Alvação; Arsénio Marengula, Olívio Saimone (Mozambique)
Note: Gerson / Danilson, Diógenes, Tó, Wilson / Além (substituted off) 90+3', Herenilson, Job (c), Tony (substituted off) 71' / Azulão, Vá (substituted off) 90+2' — Caranga (substituted on) 71', Nari (substituted on) 90+2', Élio (substituted on) 90+3'

Fri, 14 Dec 2018 R1 1L	AS Nyuki (Democratic Republic of the Congo)	0–1	(Angola) Petro Atlético	Stade des Martyrs, Kinshasa
15:30 WAT (UTC+1)		Report	28' Vá	Referee: Belay Asserese; Temesgin Atango, Tigle Belachew (Ethiopia)
Note: Gerson / Danilson, Eddie, Tó, Wilson / Além, Herenilson, Job (c), Tony (substituted off) 66' / Azulão (substituted off) 86', Vá (substituted off) 61' — Caranga (substituted on) 61', Diógenes (substituted on) 66', Dennis (substituted on) 86'

=== Preliminary round ===
Wed, 05 Dec 2018 PR 2L	Orapa United (Botswana)	0–2	(Angola) Petro Atlético	Itekeng, Orapa
19:00 WAT (UTC+1)		Report	50' Job; 53' Azulão	Referee: Lebalang Mokete; Mapoho Mapoho, Moabi Makara (Lesotho)
Note: Gerson / Danilson (substituted off) 40', Eddie, Tó, Wilson / Além, Herenilson, Job (c), Mateus (substituted off) 71' / Azulão (substituted off) 65', Vá — Élio (substituted on) 40', Dennis (substituted on) 65', Tony (substituted on) 71'

Tue, 27 Nov 2018 PR 1L	Petro Atlético (Angola)	4–0	(Botswana) Orapa United	11 de Novembro, Luanda
16:00 WAT (UTC+1)	Job 32'; Vá 68'; Tony 85', 87'	Report		Referee: Ben Ibrahim; Basile Rambeloson, Pierre Andrivoavonjy (Madagascar)
Note: Gerson / Danilson, Eddie, Tó (substituted off) 90', Wilson / Além, Herenilson, Job (c) (substituted off) 90+2', Mateus (substituted off) 82' / Azulão, Vá — Tony (substituted on) 82', Ary (substituted on) 90', Tresor (substituted on) 90+2'

=== Results summary ===
Overall								Home						Away					
Pld	W	D	L	GF	GA	GD	Pts	W	D	L	GF	GA	GD	W	D	L	GF	GA	GD
12	7	2	3	17	8	+9	23	5	0	1	11	3	+8	2	2	2	6	5	+1

Last updated: 17 March 2019.

== Angola Cup ==
=== Round of 16 ===
Wed, 08 May 2019 R16	Rec do Libolo	0–2	Petro Atlético	Estádio Municipal, Calulo
15:00 WAT (UTC+1)			13' Azulão; 87' Tony	Referee: Benjamin Andrade; Judith Mestre, Bernabé Ngulo
Note: Elber / Danilson, Eddie, Nari, Tó / Além, Caranga, Herenilson, Job (substituted off) , Manguxi (substituted off) / Azulão — Mateus (substituted on) , Tony (substituted on)

=== Quarter finals ===
Wed, 15 May 2019 QF	Petro Atlético	1–0	Bravos do Maquis	11 de Novembro, Luanda
15:00 WAT (UTC+1)	Azulão 39'	Report		Referee: Bernardo Nangolo; Pedro Alberto, António Livongue
Note: Elber / Danilson, Diógenes, Élio, Tó / Caranga, Herenilson, Manguxi (substituted off) 85', Mensah (substituted off) 60' / Azulão, Tony (substituted off) 70' — Job (substituted on) 60', Além (substituted on) 70', Megue (substituted on) 85'

=== Semi finals ===
Wed, 22 May 2019 SF	Petro de Luanda	0–1	1º de Agosto	11 de Novembro, Luanda
16:00 WAT (UTC+1)		Report	72' Dago	Referee: Hélder Martins; Evanildo Martins, Ivanildo Lopes
Note: Elber / Danilson, Eddie, Musah, Tó / Caranga, Herenilson, Job (c) (substituted off) 79', Manguxi (substituted off) 84' / Azulão, Tony (substituted off) 78' — Mensah (substituted on) 78', Mateus (substituted on) 79', Além (substituted on) 84'

== Season statistics ==
=== Appearances and goals ===
No.	Pos	Nat	Player	Total		League		Angola Cup		Confed Cup	
No.	Pos	Nat	Player	Apps	Goals	Apps	Goals	Apps	Goals	Apps	Goals
Goalkeepers
12	GK	(Angola) ANG	Élber	25	0	17	0	3	0	5	0
22	GK	(Angola) ANG	Gerson	20	0	13	0	0	0	7	0
Defenders
2	DF	(Angola) ANG	Mira	3	0	3	0	0	0	0	0
3	DF	(Angola) ANG	Ary	4	0	2+1	0	0	0	0+1	0
4	DF	(Ghana) GHA	Musah	7	0	6	0	1	0	0	0
5	DF	(Angola) ANG	Élio	10	0	6	0	1	0	0+3	0
7	DF	(Angola) ANG	Diógenes	26	0	12+5	0	1	0	7+1	0
13	DF	(Angola) ANG	Tó Carneiro	30	0	20	0	3	0	7	0
15	DF	(Angola) ANG	Wilson	36	1	24	1	0	0	12	0
23	DF	(Angola) ANG	Nari	16	0	8+4	0	1	0	2+1	0
25	DF	(Angola) ANG	Eddie	37	0	23+1	0	2	0	11	0
29	DF	(Angola) ANG	Danilson	34	0	19	0	3	0	12	0
Midfielders
6	MF	(Angola) ANG	Megue	4	0	0+3	0	0+1	0	0	0
8	MF	(Angola) ANG	Carlinhos	21	2	6+10	2	0	0	0+5	0
10	MF	(Angola) ANG	Manguxi	32	3	15+9	2	3	0	5	1
11	MF	(Angola) ANG	Job	41	7	23+4	4	2+1	0	11	3
14	MF	(Angola) ANG	Mateus	34	2	11+13	2	0+2	0	4+4	0
16	MF	(Angola) ANG	Benvindo	8	0	1+6	0	0	0	0+1	0
17	MF	(Ghana) GHA	Mensah	9	0	1+6	0	1+1	0	0	0
18	MF	(Angola) ANG	Herenilson	41	1	26+1	1	3	0	11	0
20	MF	(Angola) ANG	Além	31	0	13+6	0	1+2	0	8+1	0
21	MF	(Angola) ANG	Caranga	32	1	14+9	1	3	0	1+5	0
24	MF	(Angola) ANG	Pedro	4	0	2+1	0	0	0	1	0
Forwards
19	MF	(Brazil) BRA	Tony	43	13	21+7	9	2+1	1	7+5	3
26	FW	(Brazil) BRA	Azulão	41	20	25+1	13	3	2	11+1	5
28	FW	(Angola) ANG	Vá	27	10	16+1	5	0	0	10	5
Players transferred out during the season
9	FW	(Nigeria) NGR	Dennis	4	0	1+1	0	0	0	0+2	0
23	MF	(Angola) ANG	Tresor	3	0	2	0	0	0	0+1	0
Total
				609	60	330+85	40	33+8	3	121+32	17

Last updated: 22 May 2019
Source: Competitions

=== Scorers ===
As of 22 May 2019

Rank	Name	League		Cup		Confed		Total	
		Apps	Goals	Apps	Goals	Apps	Goals	Apps	Goals
1	(Brazil) Azulão	25(1)	13	3	2	11(1)	5	39(2)	20
2	(Brazil) Tony	21(7)	9	2(1)	1	7(5)	3	30(13)	13
3	(Angola) Vá	16(1)	5	—		10	5	26(1)	10
4	(Angola) Job	23(4)	4	2(1)	0	11	3	36(5)	7
7	(Angola) Manguxi	15(9)	2	3	0	5	1	23(9)	3
5	(Angola) Carlinhos	6(9)	2	0	0	(5)	0	6(14)	2
6	(Angola) Mateus	11(13)	2	(1)	0	4(4)	0	15(18)	2
8	(Angola) Caranga	14(9)	1	3	0	1(5)	0	18(14)	1
9	(Angola) Herenilson	26(1)	1	3	0	11	0	40(1)	1
10	(Angola) Wilson	24	1	0	0	12	0	36	1
Total			40		3		17		60

=== Clean sheets ===
As of 22 May 2019

Rank	Name	League		Cup		Confed		Total		%
		Apps	CS	Apps	CS	Apps	CS	Apps	CS	
1	(Angola) Gerson	13	7	0	0	7	4	20	11	55
2	(Angola) Elber	17	11	3	2	5	1	25	14	56
–	(Angola) Augusto	0	0	0	0	0	0	0	0	
Total			18		2		5		25	

=== Season progress ===
28/10	3/11	11/11	22/11	27/11	5/12	9/12	14/12	21/12	26/12	30/12	5/1	12/1	15/1	19/1	23/1	26/1	29/1	3/2	9/2	13/2	16/2	20/2	24/2	3/3	6/3	10/3	13/3	17/3	27/3	30/3	3/4	7/4	10/4	13/4	17/4	20/4	24/4	27/4	1/5	12/5	19/5
LIB	CCU	SCC	SAU			CAA			MAQ	KAB	INT		ASA		SRC	ACA	PRO		PRI		DES	SAG			CCU	⋅	SCC	⋅	CAA	SAG	MAQ	PRI	LIB	KAB	INT	DES	ASA	SRC	SAU	ACA	PRO
				ORA	ORA		NYU	NYU				STA		STA				HUS		GOR			ZAM	ZAM	⋅	HUS	⋅	GOR													
8/5	15/5	22/5																																							
LIB	MAQ	PRI																																							

== See also ==
- List of Atlético Petróleos de Luanda players
