= 2019–20 Atlético Petróleos de Luanda season =

Atlético Petróleos de Luanda
2019–20 season
- President: Tomás Faria
- Manager: Toni Cosano (Mar 2019–)
- Stadium: Estádio 11 de Novembro
- Champions League: Group stage
- Angola Cup: Round of 16
- Top goalscorer: League: Tony (14); All: Tony (18)
- Biggest defeat: Mamelodi 0–3 Petro (30 Nov 2018)
Home colours	Away colours	Third colours
- All statistics correct as of 21 March 2020.

The 2019–20 season of Atlético Petróleos de Luanda is the club's 39th season in the Girabola, the Angolan Premier football League and 39th consecutive season in the top flight of Angolan football. In 2019–20, the club is participating in the Girabola, the Angola Cup and the CAF Champions League.

On April 30, 2020, in a meeting with representatives of the 2019–20 season girabola clubs, the Angolan Football Federation decided to cancel the 2019-20 Girabola season due to the coronavirus pandemic.

== Squad information ==
As of August 2019

Squad No.	Name	Nationality	Position(s)	Place of birth	Date of birth (age)	Previous club
Goalkeepers
12	Jorge Delgado Elber	(Angola) (Cape Verde)	GK	Luanda, Angola	24 June 1991 (aged 29)	(Angola) Kabuscorp
22	Gerson Barros	(Angola) (Portugal)	GK	Luanda, Angola	1 April 1987 (aged 33)	(Angola) Santos FC
30	Augusto Mualucano	(Angola)	GK	Luanda, Angola	1 January 1998 (aged 22)	(Angola) Junior team
Defenders
3	Ariclene Oliveira Ary	(Angola)	LB	Luanda, Angola	6 August 1992 (aged 28)	(Angola) Recreativo do Libolo
4	Musah Inusah	(Ghana)	CB	Ghana	1 February 1994 (aged 26)	(Ghana) Hearts of Oak
7	Diógenes João	(Angola)	RB	Luanda, Angola	1 January 1997 (aged 23)	(Angola) Junior team
13	Augusto Carneiro Tó	(Angola)	LB	Luanda, Angola	5 November 1995 (aged 25)	(Angola) Interclube
15	Wilson Gaspar	(Angola) (Portugal)	CB	Porto, Portugal	29 September 1990 (aged 30)	(Angola) Kabuscorp
23	Bráulio Diniz Nari	(Angola)	RB	Luanda, Angola	30 April 1987 (aged 33)	(Angola) Kabuscorp
25	Eddie Afonso	(Angola)	LB	Luanda, Angola	7 March 1994 (aged 26)	(Angola) Recreativo do Libolo
29	Daniel Kilola Danilson	(Angola)	CB	Luanda, Angola	6 July 1999 (aged 21)	(Angola) Junior team
32	Euclides dos Santos Kelson	(Angola)	CB	Benguela, Angola	18 January 2000 (aged 20)	(Angola) Junior team
Midfielders
2	Hermenegildo Sengui Picas	(Angola)	LW	D.R. Congo	14 February 2001 (aged 19)	(Angola) Junior team
6	Pedro Pessoa Miguel Megue	(Angola)	LW	Angola	2 March 1998 (aged 22)	(Angola) Junior team
8	Silas Satonho Dany	(Angola)	AM/CM	Luanda, Angola	14 January 1990 (aged 30)	(Angola) Kabuscorp
10	Augusto Quibeto Manguxi	(Angola)	CM	Luanda, Angola	27 November 1991 (aged 29)	(Angola) Santos FC
11	Ricardo Job Estevão	(Angola)	RW	Luanda, Angola	27 September 1987 (aged 33)	(Angola) ASA
16	Benvindo Afonso	(Angola)	CM	Luanda, Angola	10 October 2001 (aged 19)	(Angola) Junior team
17	Isaac Mensah	(Ghana)	AM	Accra, Ghana	13 December 1995 (aged 25)	(Ghana) Hearts of Oak
18	Herenilson do Carmo	(Angola)	DM	Luanda, Angola	23 May 1996 (aged 24)	(Angola) Junior team
19	António Ribeiro Tony	(Brazil)	RW/LW	Vitória, Brazil	6 October 1992 (aged 28)	(Brazil) Brusque F.C.
20	Alberto Miguel Além	(Angola)	DM	Luanda, Angola	6 December 1997 (aged 23)	(Angola) Progresso Sambizanga
21	Jorge Carneiro Caranga	(Angola)	RW/LW	Luanda, Angola	1 January 1992 (aged 28)	(Angola) Interclube
27	Roandro Semedo Bugos	(Angola)	RW/LW	Luanda, Angola	27 October 1990 (aged 30)	(Angola) Sagrada Esperança
31	Santos Kiaku Dos Santos	(Angola)	MF	Luanda, Angola	—	(Angola) Junior team
Forwards
9	Jacques Tuyisenge	(Rwanda)	ST	Luanda, Angola	22 September 1991 (aged 29)	(Kenya) Gor Mahia
24	Dolly Menga	(Angola) (Belgium)	FW	Verviers, Belgium	2 May 1993 (aged 27)	(Scotland) Livingston F.C.
28	Adriano Nicolau Yano	(Angola)	ST	Luanda, Angola	8 July 1992 (aged 28)	(Angola) Progresso Sambizanga
33	Tango Gastão Gladilson	(Angola)	FW	Luanda, Angola	—	(Angola) Junior team

=== Staff ===
Nat	Name	Position(s)	Date of birth (age)
Technical staff
(Spain)	Toni Cosano	Head coach	28 March 1977 (aged 43)
(Angola)	Flávio Amado	Assistant Coach	30 December 1979 (aged 41)
(Angola)	João Ndoce	Assistant Coach	–
Medical
(Angola)	Nelson Bolivar	Physician	–
(Brazil)	Maurício Marques	Physio	–
(Angola)	Ramiro José	Masseur	–
Management
(Angola)	Tomás Faria	Chairman	–
(Angola)	Sidónio Malamba	Head of Foot Dept	–

=== Pre-season transfers ===
No.	Nat	Nick	Name	Pos	Date of birth (age)	
Transfers out To
5	(Angola)	Élio	Élio Wilson Costa Martins	CM	20 December 1987 (aged 32)	
8	(Angola)	Carlinhos	Carlos Sténio do Carmo	MF	19 March 1995 (aged 25)	Interclube
14	(Angola)	Mateus	Mateus Gaspar Domingos	RW	20 August 1993 (aged 27)	Interclube
26	(Brazil)	Azulão	Tiago Lima Leal	MF	26 March 1988 (aged 32)	Olympiakos Nicosia
28	(Angola)	Vá	Vladimiro Edson António Félix	FW	24 August 1998 (aged 22)	Pafos FC
Transfers in From
9	(Rwanda)	Jacques	Jacques Tuyisenge	FW	22 September 1991 (aged 29)	Gor Mahia F.C.
24	(Angola)	Dolly Menga	Dolly Domingos Menga	FW	2 May 1993 (aged 27)	Livingston F.C.
28	(Angola)	Yano	Adriano Belmiro Duarte Nicolau	FW	8 July 1992 (aged 28)	Progresso Sambizanga
31	(Angola)	Dos Santos	Santos Nkiambi Kiaku	MF	—	Junior team
32	(Angola)	Kelson	Euclides Moisés Fernando dos Santos	DF	18 January 2000 (aged 20)	Junior team

=== Mid-season transfers ===
No.	Nat	Nick	Name	Pos	Date of birth (age)	
Transfers out To
16	(Angola)	Benvindo	Benvindo Miguel André Afonso	MF	10 October 2001 (aged 19)	Wiliete S.C.
33	(Angola)	Gladilson	Tangu Gastão	MF	28 December 2001 (aged 19)	Wiliete S.C.
Transfers in From

== Overview ==
Competition	First match	Last match	Final position	Record							
Competition	First match	Last match	Final position	Pld	W	D	L	GF	GA	GD	Win %
Girabola	17 August 2019	21 March 2020	cancelled	24	16	6	2	41	10	+31	66.67
Angola Cup	5 February 2020	12 February 2020	Round of 16	2	0	2	0	3	3	+0	0.00
CAF Champions League	11 August 2019	31 January 2020	Group stage	10	2	6	2	13	15	−2	20.00
Total				36	18	14	4	57	28	+29	50.00

Last updated: 21 March 2020

== Angolan League ==
=== League table ===
Pos	Team	Pld	W	D	L	GF	GA	GD	Pts	Qualification or relegation
1	Petro de Luanda	24	16	6	2	41	10	+31	54	Qualification for Champions League
2	Primeiro de Agosto	23	16	3	4	42	13	+29	51	Qualification for Champions League
3	Bravos do Maquis	23	12	4	7	26	22	+4	40	Qualification for Confederation Cup
4	Desportivo da Huíla	22	10	7	5	24	16	+8	37	
5	Sagrada Esperança	23	9	7	7	21	16	+5	34	

Updated to match(es) played on 22 March 2020. Source: Girabola.com Girabola
Rules for classification: 1) Points; 2) Head-to-head points; 3) Goal difference; 4) Head-to-head goal difference; 5) Goals scored; 6) Fair-play points; 7) Play-off.

=== Match details ===
Sat, 17 Aug 2019 01	Wiliete SC	2–2	Petro Atlético	Ombaka, Benguela
15:00 WAT (UTC+1)	João Vala 11'; Quinho 90+3'	Report	5' Tony; 50' Yano	Referee: José Álvaro; Assts: Estanislau Guedes, Rosário Cassinda
Note: Elber / Eddie, Nari, Tó Carneiro, Wilson (c) / Além, Bugos (substituted off) 46', Caranga, Manguxi / Megue (substituted off) 75', Tony (substituted off) 85' — Yano (substituted on) 46', Dany (substituted on) 75', Jacques (substituted on) 85'

Sat, 31 Aug 2019 03	Desportivo Huíla	1–0	Petro Atlético	Estádio do Ferrovia, Lubango
15:30 WAT (UTC+1)	Manico 81'	Report		Referee: Feliciano Lucas; Alexandre Bengue, Horácio Tchissingue
Note: Elber / Diógenes, Musah, Tó Carneiro, Wilson / Além (substituted off) 83', Caranga, Herenilson, Job (c) (substituted off) 61' / Jacques (substituted off) 65', Tony — Dolly Menga (substituted on) 61', Yano (substituted on) 65', Manguxi (substituted on) 83'

Wed, 18 Sep 2019 04	Petro Atlético	1–0	Sagrada	11 de Novembro, Luanda
16:00 WAT (UTC+1)	Yano 88'	Report		Referee: António Dungula; Manuel Benguela, Bernabé Ngulo
Note: Elber / Ary, Eddie, Musah (substituted off) 11', Wilson / Além, Dos Santos (substituted off) 46', Job (c), Tony / Picas (substituted off) 74', Yano — Kelson (substituted on) 11', Dany (substituted on) 46', Dolly Menga (substituted on) 74'

Mon, 23 Sep 2019 05	Ferrovia Huambo	0–2	Petro Atlético	Estádio do Ferrovia, Huambo
15:30 WAT (UTC+1)		Report	35' Dos Santos; 56' Dany	Referee: Yuri de Melo; Adão Silva, Evandro Rocha
Note: Elber / Ary, Diógenes, Nari, Wilson (c) / Além, Dos Santos (substituted off) 46', Tony, Mensah (substituted on) 63' / Dolly Menga, Yano (substituted off) 78' — Dany (substituted on) 46', Job (substituted on) 63', Jacques (substituted on) 78'

Tue, 01 Oct 2019 06	Petro Atlético	2–0	S^{ta} Rita de Cássia	11 de Novembro, Luanda
16:00 WAT (UTC+1)	Yano 45'; Tony 55'	Report		Referee: Paulo Sérgio; Segunda Tchisseque, Ilídio Coimbra
Note: Elber / Danilson, Diógenes, Nari, Tó Carneiro / Além, Dany (substituted off) 73', Job (c), Tony / Dolly Menga (substituted off) 62', Yano (substituted off) 63' — Mensah (substituted on) 62', Jacques (substituted on) 63', Herenilson (substituted on) 73'

Sat, 05 Oct 2019 07	Rec da Caála	1–1	Petro Atlético	Mártires da Canhala, Caála
15:00 WAT (UTC+1)	Nilton 84'	Report	27' Tony	Referee: Tânia Duarte; Jerson Emiliano, Wilson Ntyamba
Note: Elber / Danilson (substituted off) 82', Diógenes, Musah, Tó Carneiro / Além, Dany (substituted off) 73', Job (c) (substituted off) 62', Tony / Mensah, Yano — Dolly Menga (substituted on) 62', Herenilson (substituted on) 73', Jacques (substituted on) 82'

Sat, 12 Oct 2019 08	Petro Atlético	3–1	Cuando Cubango	11 de Novembro, Luanda
17:30 WAT (UTC+1)	Tony 30' (pen.); Jacques 44'; Job 80'	Report	14' Paulito	Referee: Bernardo Nangolo; Luísa Luhaco, António Livongue
Note: Elber / Ary, Danilson, Diógenes (c), Musah / Além, Dany, Picas (substituted off) , Tony / Jacques, Yano — Mensah (substituted on) 64', Job (substituted on) 75', Nari (substituted on) 83'

Fri, 18 Oct 2019 02	Petro Atlético	2–1	Progresso	11 de Novembro, Luanda
16:00 WAT (UTC+1)	Dany 22'; Tony 57' (pen.)	Report	14' Chiló	Referee: Benjamin Andrade; Bernabé Ngulo, Nilton Armando
Note: Elber / Diógenes, Musah, Tó Carneiro, Wilson (c) / Além, Dany, Picas (substituted off) 54', Tony / Jacques (substituted off) 70', Yano (substituted off) 85' — Job (substituted on) 54', Mensah (substituted on) 70', Dos Santos (substituted on) 85'

Wed, 23 Oct 2019 09	Interclube	0–3	Petro Atlético	22 de Junho, Luanda
16:00 WAT (UTC+1)			30', 90+1' Yano; 59' Tony	Referee: João Goma; José Felix, Dário Gaspar
Note: Elber / Diógenes, Musah, Tó Carneiro, Wilson / Além, Dany, Job (c) (substituted off) , Tony (substituted off) 60' / Jacques (substituted off) 75', Yano — Mensah (substituted on) 60', Herenilson (substituted on) 75', Dolly Menga (substituted on)

Mon, 28 Oct 2019 10	Petro Atlético	3–0	Bravos Maquis	11 de Novembro, Luanda
17:00 WAT (UTC+1)	Tony 33'; Yano 49'; Jacques 80'	Report		Referee: Nuno Eduardo; Manuel Benguela, Joaquim Chiyo
Note: Elber / Diógenes, Musah, Tó Carneiro, Wilson / Além, Dany, Job (c), Tony (substituted off) 75' / Jacques, Yano (substituted off) 70' — Mensah (substituted on) 70', Picas (substituted on) 75', Herenilson (substituted on) 83'

Sun, 03 Nov 2019 11	1º de Agosto	0–2	Petro Atlético	11 de Novembro, Luanda
16:00 WAT (UTC+1)		Report	42' Dany; 80' Mensah	Referee: Hélder Martins; Jerson Emiliano, Ivanildo Lopes
Note: Elber / Diógenes, Musah, Tó Carneiro, Wilson / Além, Dany, Job (c) (substituted off) 77', Tony (substituted off) 67' / Jacques (substituted off) 57', Yano — Mensah (substituted on) 57', Herenilson (substituted on) 67', Dolly Menga (substituted on) 77'

Sun, 23 Nov 2019 12	Petro Atlético	Annulled (originally 2–0)	1º de Maio	11 de Novembro, Luanda
17:30 WAT (UTC+1)	Tony 18'; Musah 42'	Report		Referee: Mbunga Kazi; Regina Ngola, Sérgio David
Note: Elber / Diógenes, Musah, Tó Carneiro, Wilson / Além (substituted off) 46', Dany, Job (c) (substituted off) 75', Mensah / Tony (substituted off) 65', Yano — Herenilson (substituted on) 46', Caranga (substituted on) 65', Dolly Menga (substituted on) 75'

Sat, 14 Dec 2019 13	Petro Atlético	3–0	Rec do Libolo	11 de Novembro, Luanda
16:00 WAT (UTC+1)	Tony 26', 51', 68'	Report		Referee: Ailton Carmelino; Evanildo Lopes, Aldair Carmelino
Note: Gerson / Danilson, Eddie, Tó Carneiro, Wilson / Dany, Herenilson, Job (c), Mensah (substituted off) 70' / Jacques (substituted off) 63', Tony (substituted off) 75' — Yano (substituted on) 63', Dolly Menga (substituted on) 70', Caranga (substituted on) 75'

Wed, 18 Dec 2019 14	Académica	0–1	Petro Atlético	Ombaka, Benguela
15:30 WAT (UTC+1)			41' Dany	Referee: Miguel Mateus; Júlio Lemos, Luís Mateus
Note: Gerson / Danilson, Eddie, Tó Carneiro, Wilson / Dany, Herenilson, Job (c), Mensah (substituted off) 45' / Jacques (substituted off) 45', Tony — Yano (substituted on) 45', Caranga (substituted on) 45'

Sat, 21 Dec 2019 15	Petro Atlético	2–0	Sporting Cabinda	11 de Novembro, Luanda
17:30 WAT (UTC+1)	Yano 45+2'; Tony 78'	Report		Referee: Mauro de Oliveira; Domingos Francisco, Nery Silva
Note: Gerson / Danilson, Diógenes, Tó Carneiro, Wilson / Além (substituted off) 72', Dany, Mensah, Tony / Picas (substituted off) 65', Yano — Job (substituted on) 65', Herenilson (substituted on) 71'

Sat, 18 Jan 2020 16	Petro Atlético	0–0	Wiliete SC	11 de Novembro, Luanda
17:30 WAT (UTC+1)				Referee: Paulo Sérgio; Joaquim da Rocha, Luís Mateus
Note: Gerson / Danilson, Eddie, Nari, Tó Carneiro / Dany, Herenilson (substituted off) 83', Job (c) (substituted off) 65', Mensah / Jacques (substituted off) 57', Yano — Picas (substituted on) 57', Caranga (substituted on) 65', Manguxi (substituted on) 83'

Sat, 08 Feb 2020 19	Sagrada	0–0	Petro Atlético	Sagrada Esperança, Dundo
15:00 WAT (UTC+1)		Report		Referee: Feliciano Lucas; Ivanildo Martins, Luís Mateus
Note: Gerson / Diógenes, Musah, Tó Carneiro, Wilson / Dany (substituted off) 45', Job (c), Mensah (substituted off) 63' / Jacques (substituted off) 45', Tony — Manguxi (substituted on) 45', Megue (substituted on) 45', Caranga (substituted on) 63'

Sat, 15 Feb 2020 20	Petro Atlético	2–0	Ferrovia Huambo	11 de Novembro, Luanda
17:30 WAT (UTC+1)	Yano 13'; Jacques 19'			Referee: Carlos Armando; Manuel Lobe, Alberto Dumbi
Note: Elber / Ary, Diógenes, Musah, Wilson (c) / Dany, Herenilson, Picas (substituted off) 78', Tony / Jacques (substituted off) 84', Yano (substituted off) 68' — Caranga (substituted on) 68', Bugos (substituted on) 78', Manguxi (substituted on) 84'

Sat, 22 Feb 2020 21	S^{ta} Rita de Cássia	0–2	Petro Atlético	4 de Janeiro, Uíge
15:00 WAT (UTC+1)			26' Yano; 88' (pen.) Tony	Referee: João Goma
Note: Elber / Eddie, Diógenes, Musah, Wilson (c) / Dany (substituted off) 80', Herenilson, Picas, Tony / Jacques (substituted off) 56', Yano (substituted off) 70' — Mensah (substituted on) 56', Além (substituted on) 70', Manguxi (substituted on) 80'

Wed, 26 Feb 2020 17	Progresso	1–1	Petro Atlético	Coqueiros, Luanda
16:00 WAT (UTC+1)	Kibeixa 90' (pen.)	Report	(yellow card) (yellow-red card) 43' Herenilson; 62' (pen.) Tony	Referee: Rodrigues Aleixo; Nicodemos Calembela, Francisco Paulo
Note: Elber / Diógenes, Musah, Tó Carneiro, Wilson (c) / Dany, Herenilson, Mensah, Tony / Picas (substituted off) 82', Yano (substituted off) 70' — Job (substituted on) 76', Eddie (substituted on) 82'

Sat, 29 Feb 2020 22	Petro Atlético	3–0	Rec da Caála	11 de Novembro, Luanda
16:00 WAT (UTC+1)	Yano 4'; Tony 65' (pen.); 86' Dany	Report		Referee: António Dungula; Manuel Benguela, Nilton Armando
Note: Elber / Eddie, Musah, Tó Carneiro, Wilson / Além, Dany, Job (c) (substituted off) 85', Tony / Picas (substituted off) 58', Yano (substituted off) 71' — Mensah (substituted on) 58', Manguxi (substituted on) 71', Caranga (substituted on) 85'

Sat, 07 Mar 2020 23	Cuando Cubango	0–1	Petro Atlético	Municipal, Menongue
15:00 WAT (UTC+1)		Report	47' Yano	Referee: José Chitumba; Estanislau Guedes, Luísa Luhaco
Note: Elber / Eddie, Musah, Tó Carneiro, Wilson / Além, Dany, Job (c) (substituted off) 83', Tony / Picas (substituted off) 60', Yano (substituted off) 70' — Mensah (substituted on) 60', Herenilson (substituted on) 70', Diógenes (substituted on) 83'

Sat, 11 Mar 2020 18	Petro Atlético	0–1	Desportivo Huíla	11 de Novembro, Luanda
16:00 WAT (UTC+1)			11' Mendes	Referee: Ailton Carmelino; Ivanildo Lopes, Evanildo Martins
Note: Elber / Eddie, Musah, Tó Carneiro, Wilson (substituted off) 83' / Dany (substituted off) 70', Herenilson, Job (c), Tony / Picas (substituted off) 62', Yano — Manguxi (substituted on) 62', Mensah (substituted on) 70', Jacques (substituted on) 83'

Sat, 14 Mar 2020 24	Petro Atlético	2–2	Interclube	11 de Novembro, Luanda
17:30 WAT (UTC+1)	Ito 77' (o.g.); Yano 90+6'	Report	74' Paty; 87' Quinito	Referee: Paulo sérgio Júlio Lemos
Note: Elber / Diógenes, Musah, Tó Carneiro, Wilson (c) / Herenilson, Manguxi (substituted off) 80', Megue (substituted off) 45', Mensah (substituted off) 45' / Tony, Yano — Job (substituted on) 45', Picas (substituted on) 45', Dany (substituted on) 80'

Sat, 21 Mar 2020 25	Bravos Maquis	0–3	Petro Atlético	Mundunduleno, Luena
15:00 WAT (UTC+1)		Report	54' Yano; 61' (o.g.) Wiwí; 68' Tony	Referee: Bernardo Nangolo; Wilson Ntyamba, Judith Mestre
Note: Elber / Eddie, Musah (substituted off) 78', Tó Carneiro, Wilson / Além, Dany (substituted off) 87', Job (c), Tony / Picas, Yano (substituted off) 82' — Nari (substituted on) 78', Manguxi (substituted on) 82', Jacques (substituted on) 87'

Sat, 04 Apr 2020 26	Petro Atlético	–	1º de Agosto	11 de Novembro, Luanda
16:00 WAT (UTC+1)

Mon, 11 Apr 2020 27	1º de Maio	Cancelled	Petro Atlético	Ombaka, Benguela
15:00 WAT (UTC+1)

Sat, 18 Apr 2020 28	Rec do Libolo	–	Petro Atlético	Estádio Municipal, Calulo
15:00 WAT (UTC+1)

Sun, 26 Apr 2020 29	Petro Atlético	–	Académica	11 de Novembro, Luanda
17:00 WAT (UTC+1)

Sat, 02 May 2020 30	Sporting Cabinda	–	Petro Atlético	Tafe, Cabinda
15:00 WAT (UTC+1)

=== Results ===
==== Results by round ====
Round	1	2	3	4	5	6	7	8	9	10	11	12	13	14	15	16	17	18	19	20	21	22	23	24	25	26	27	28	29	30
Ground	A	H	A	H	A	H	A	H	A	H	A	H	H	A	H	H	A	H	A	H	A	H	A	H	A	H	A	A	H	A
Result	D	W	L	W	W	W	D	W	W	W	W		W	W	W	D	D	L	D	D	W	W	W	D	W					
Position	8	3	7	6	4	4	4	3	2	2	2		2	1	1	2	2	2	2	2	1	1	1	2						

Updated to match(es) played on 15 March 2020. Source: girabolazap.co.ao
A = Away; H = Home; W = Win; D = Draw; L = Loss

==== Results summary ====
Overall								Home						Away					
Pld	W	D	L	GF	GA	GD	Pts	W	D	L	GF	GA	GD	W	D	L	GF	GA	GD
24	16	6	2	41	10	+31	54	9	2	1	23	5	+18	7	4	1	18	5	+13

Last updated: 21 March 2020.

== CAF Champions League ==
=== Group stage ===
Pos	Team	Pld	W	D	L	GF	GA	GD	Pts	Qualification
1	(South Africa) Mamelodi Sundowns	6	4	2	0	9	3	+6	14	Advance to knockout stage
2	(Morocco) Wydad AC	6	2	3	1	10	6	+4	9	Advance to knockout stage
3	(Angola) Petro de Luanda	6	0	4	2	8	14	−6	4	
4	(Algeria) USM Alger	6	0	3	3	6	10	−4	3	

Source: CAF
Rules for classification: Tiebreakers

Sat, 01 Feb 2020 GC R3 2L	USM Alger (Algeria)	2–2	(Angola) Petro Atlético	20 Août, Bordj Bou Arréridj
14:00 CET (UTC+1)	Mahious 33'; Ardji 70'	Report	80' Picas; 81' Tony	Referee: Sadok Selmi (Tunisia); Khalil Hasseni, Aymen Ismail
Note: Gerson / Diógenes, Musah, Tó Carneiro, Wilson / Além (substituted off) 75', Caranga (substituted off) 60', Herenilson, Job (c), Mensah (substituted off) 45' / Jacques — Picas (substituted on) 45', Tony (substituted on) 60', Manguxi (substituted on) 75'

Sat, 25 Jan 2020 GC R2 2L	Petro Atlético (Angola)	2–2	(South Africa) Mamelodi Sundowns	11 de Novembro, Luanda
14:00 WAT (UTC+1)	Job 40' (pen.); Jacques 70'	Report	22' (pen.) Sirino; 90' Madisha	Referee: Mahamadou Keita (Mali); Baba Yomboliba, Nouhou Bamba
Note: Gerson / Danilson, Diógenes, Tó Carneiro, Wilson / Além, Dany, Job (c), Mensah (substituted off) 62' / Jacques (substituted off) 87', Picas — Yano (substituted on) 62', Nari (substituted on) 87'

Sat, 11 Jan 2020 GC R1 2L	Petro Atlético (Angola)	2–2	(Morocco) Wydad Casablanca	11 de Novembro, Luanda
17:00 WAT (UTC+1)	Herenilson 20'; Dany 45'	Report	13' Kasengu; 53' Jabrane	Referee: Ibrahim Traoré (Côte d'Ivoire); Assts: Adou Ngoh, Ashumu Hermann
Note: Gerson / Danilson, Diógenes, Tó Carneiro, Wilson / Além (substituted off) 81', Dany, Herenilson, Job (c) (substituted off) 31', Mensah (substituted off) 67' / Tony — Picas (substituted on) 31', Dolly Menga (substituted on) 67', Yano (substituted on) 81'

Fri, 27 Dec 2019 GC R3 1L	Wydad Casablanca (Morocco)	4–1	(Angola) Petro Atlético	Mohammed V, Casablanca
20:00 CET (UTC+1)	El Kaabi 28', 78', 90+2' (pen.); Wilson 83' (o.g.)	Report	67' Tony	Referee: Janny Sikazwe (Zambia); Assts: Arsénio Marengula (Mozambique), Souru Phatšoane (Lesotho)
Note: Gerson / Danilson, Diógenes, Tó Carneiro, Wilson / Além, Dany (substituted off) 74', Job (c), Mensah (substituted off) 64', Nari (substituted off) 86' / Tony — Caranga (substituted on) 64', Megue (substituted on) 74', Yano (substituted on) 86'

Sat, 07 Dec 2019 GC R2 1L	Petro Atlético (Angola)	1–1	(Algeria) USM Alger	11 de Novembro, Luanda
14:00 WAT (UTC+1)	Tony 63'	Report	54' Benchaâ	Referee: Bamlak Weyesa (Ethiopia); Assts: Kindie Mussie, Temesgin Atango
Note: Elber / Diógenes, Musah, Tó Carneiro, Wilson / Além (substituted off) 67', Dany, Herenilson, Job (c), Mensah (substituted off) 84' / Tony (substituted off) 79' — Dolly Menga (substituted on) 67', Jacques (substituted on) 79', Yano (substituted on) 84'

Sat, 30 Nov 2019 GC R1 1L	Mamelodi Sundowns (South Africa)	3–0	(Angola) Petro Atlético	Lucas Moripe, Pretoria
19:00 SAST (UTC+2)	Affonso 7'; Madisha 7'; Mkhulise 76'	Report		Referee: Gehad Grisha (Egypt); Assts: Tahssen Bedyer, Ahmed Taha
Note: Elber / Diógenes, Musah, Tó Carneiro, Wilson / Além, Dany, Job (c) (substituted off) 70', Mensah / Tony (substituted off) 81', Yano (substituted off) 71' — Caranga (substituted on) 70', Megue (substituted on) 71', Jacques (substituted on) 81'

=== First round ===
Fri, 27 Sep 2019 FR 2L	Kampala City (Uganda)	1–1	(Angola) Petro Atlético	StarTimes, Kampala
16:00 EAT (UTC+3)	Kizza 56'		35' Job	Referee: Ahmad Heeralall (Mauritius); Assts: Jean-Marc Pithia, Ram Babajee
Note: Elber / Diógenes, Musah, Tó Carneiro, Wilson / Além, Caranga, Dany (substituted off) , Job (c) (substituted off) / Mensah, Picas — Bugos (substituted on) 60', Megue (substituted on)

Sat, 14 Sep 2019 FR 1L	Petro Atlético (Angola)	0–0	(Uganda) Kampala City	11 de Novembro, Luanda
16:00 WAT (UTC+1)		Report		Referee: Belay Tadesse (Ethiopia); Assts: Kindie Mussie, Tigle Belachew
Note: Elber / Eddie, Musah, Tó Carneiro, Wilson / Além, Caranga (substituted off) 72', Job (c), Manguxi (substituted off) 65' / Mensah (substituted off) 64', Picas — Gladilson (substituted on) 64', Dany (substituted on) 65', Diógenes (substituted on) 72'

=== Preliminary round ===
Sun, 25 Aug 2019 PR 2L	Petro Atlético (Angola)	2–0	(Lesotho) Matlama FC	11 de Novembro, Luanda
16:00 WAT (UTC+1)	Mensah 37'; Benvindo 82'	Report		Referee: Tshepo Gobagoba (Botswana)
Note: Elber / Diógenes, Musah, Tó Carneiro, Wilson / Caranga, Dany (substituted off) 71', Herenilson, Job (c), Megue (substituted off) 70' / Mensah (substituted off) 77' — Manguxi (substituted on) 70', Benvindo (substituted on) 71', Bugos (substituted on) 77'

Sun, 11 Aug 2019 PR 1L	Matlama FC (Lesotho)	0–2	(Angola) Petro Atlético	Setsoto Stadium, Maseru
15:00 SAST (UTC+2)		Report	7' Manguxi; 31' Mensah	Referee: Norman Matemera (Zimbabwe)
Note: Elber / Eddie, Nari, Tó Carneiro, Wilson (c) / Além, Caranga, Manguxi, Mensah / Megue, Picas — Diógenes (substituted on) , Herenilson (substituted on)

=== Results summary ===
Overall								Home						Away					
Pld	W	D	L	GF	GA	GD	Pts	W	D	L	GF	GA	GD	W	D	L	GF	GA	GD
10	2	6	2	13	15	−2	12	1	4	0	7	5	+2	1	2	2	6	10	−4

Last updated: 1 February 2020.

== Angola Cup ==
=== Round of 16 ===
Wed, 05 Feb 2020 R16	Sagrada Esperança	1–1	Petro Atlético	Sagrada Esperança, Dundo
15:00 WAT (UTC+1)	Cachi 52'	Report	20' Megue	Referee: António Dungula; Jerson Emiliano, Ivanildo Lopes
Note: Gerson / Eddie, Kelson, Musah, Tó Carneiro / Caranga (substituted off) 86', Herenilson, Manguxi, Megue (substituted off) 66' / Jacques (substituted off) 70', Picas — Mensah (substituted on) 66', Yano (substituted on) 70', Diógenes (substituted on) 86'

Wed, 12 Feb 2020 R16	Petro Atlético	2–2	Sagrada Esperança	11 de Novembro, Luanda
16:00 WAT (UTC+1)	Manguxi 48'; Tony 62'		45+1' Gaspar; 65' Lulas	Referee: Benjamin Andrade; Júlio Lemos, Joaquim da Rocha
Note: Gerson / Eddie, Musah, Tó Carneiro, Wilson / Herenilson, Manguxi, Mensah (substituted off) 37', Megue (substituted off) 45' / Picas (substituted off) 60', Tony — Yano (substituted on) 45', Caranga (substituted on) 37', Job (substituted on) 60'

== Season statistics ==
=== Appearances ===
As of 21 March 2020

No.	Pos.	Nat.	Name	Girabola		Angola Cup		CAF Champions League		Total	
No.	Pos.	Nat.	Name	Mins	Apps	Mins	Apps	Mins	Apps	Mins	Apps
13	DF	(Angola)	Tó Carneiro	1710	19	180	2	900	10	2790	31
15	DF	(Angola)	Wilson	1793	20	90	1	900	10	2783	31
19	MF	(Brazil)	Tony	1982	23	90	1	370	4(1)	2442	28(1)
8	MF	(Angola)	Dany	1713	19(4)	–		590	7(1)	2303	26(5)
12	GK	(Angola)	Elber	1710	19	–		540	6	2250	25
20	MF	(Angola)	Além	1435	17(1)	–		763	9	2198	26(1)
7	DF	(Angola)	Diógenes	1357	15(1)	4	(1)	748	8(2)	2109	23(4)
11	MF	(Angola)	Job	1395	15(6)	30	(1)	721	9	2146	24(7)
4	DF	(Ghana)	Musah	1361	16	180	2	540	6	2081	24
28	FW	(Angola)	Yano	1679	19(4)	65	(2)	118	1(4)	1862	20(10)
17	MF	(Ghana)	Mensah	919	8(10)	61	1(1)	733	10	1713	19(11)
2	MF	(Angola)	Picas	986	11(3)	122	2	464	4(2)	1572	17(5)
18	MF	(Angola)	Herenilson	874	9(7)	180	2	370	4(1)	1424	15(8)
25	MF	(Angola)	Eddie	908	10(1)	180	2	180	2	1268	14(1)
9	FW	(Rwanda)	Jacques	859	12(6)	70	1	197	2(2)	1126	15(8)
22	GK	(Angola)	Gerson	450	5	180	2	360	4	990	11
21	MF	(Angola)	Caranga	319	2(6)	139	1(1)	448	5(2)	906	8(9)
29	DF	(Angola)	Danilson	622	7	–		270	3	892	10
10	MF	(Angola)	Manguxi	300	2(8)	180	2	190	2(2)	670	6(10)
23	DF	(Angola)	Nari	379	4(2)	–		179	2(1)	558	6(3)
6	MF	(Angola)	Megue	165	2(1)	111	2	200	2(3)	476	6(4)
3	DF	(Angola)	Ary	360	4	–		0		360	4
24	FW	(Angola)	Dolly Menga	268	2(6)	–		46	(2)	314	2(8)
32	DF	(Angola)	Kelson	79	(1)	90	1	0		169	1(1)
27	MF	(Angola)	Bugos	57	1(1)	–		43	(2)	100	1(3)
31	MF	(Angola)	Dos Santos	95	2(1)	–		0		95	2(1)
33	FW	(Angola)	Gladilson	0		–		26	(1)	26	(1)
16	MF	(Angola)	Benvindo	0		–		19	(1)	19	(1)

=== Scorers ===
As of 21 March 2020

No.	Pos.	Nat.	Name	Girabola		Angola Cup		CAF Champions League		Total	
No.	Pos.	Nat.	Name	Mins	Gls	Mins	Gls	Mins	Gls	Mins	Gls
1	MF	(Brazil)	Tony	1982	14	90	1	370	3	2442	18
2	FW	(Angola)	Yano	1679	13	65	0	118	0	1862	13
3	MF	(Angola)	Dany	1713	5	–		590	1	2303	6
4	FW	(Rwanda)	Jacques	859	3	70	0	197	1	1126	4
5	MF	(Ghana)	Mensah	919	1	61	0	733	2	1713	3
5	MF	(Angola)	Job	1395	1	30	0	721	2	2146	3
6	MF	(Angola)	Manguxi	300	0	180	1	190	1	670	2
7	MF	(Angola)	Benvindo	–		–		19	1	19	1
7	MF	(Angola)	Dos Santos	95	1	–		–		95	1
7	MF	(Angola)	Megue	165	0	111	1	200	0	476	1
7	MF	(Angola)	Herenilson	874	0	180	0	370	1	1424	1
7	FW	(Angola)	Picas	986	0	122	0	464	1	1572	1
7	DF	(Angola)	Wilson	1793	1	90	0	900	0	2783	1
Opponents
–	MF	(Angola)	Ito	–	1	–		–		–	1
–	DF	(Angola)	Wiwí	–	1	–		–		–	1
Total					41		3		13		57

==== Own goals ====
As of 28 December 2019

No.	Pos.	Nat.	Name	Girabola	Angola Cup	CAF Champions League	Total
15	DF	(Angola)	Wilson	0	–	1	1
Total				0	–	1	1

=== Clean sheets ===
As of 21 March 2020

No.	Pos.	Nat.	Name	Girabola		Angola Cup		CAF Champions League		Total	
No.	Pos.	Nat.	Name	Apps	CS	Apps	CS	Apps	CS	Apps	CS
12	GK	(Angola)	Elber	19	11	–		6	3	25	14
22	GK	(Angola)	Gerson	5	5	2	0	4	0	11	5
Total					16		–		3		19

=== Season progress ===
11/8	17/8	25/8	31/8	14/9	18/9	23/9	27/9	1/10	5/10	12/10	18/10	23/10	28/10	3/11	23/11	30/11	7/12	14/12	18/12	21/12	28/12	11/1	18/1	25/1	1/2	5/2	8/2	12/2	15/2	22/2	26/2	29/2	7/3	11/3	15/3	21/3
MAT	WIL	MAT	DES	KCC	SAG	FER	KCC	SRC	CAA	CCU	PRO	INT	MAQ	PRI	~~MAI~~	MAM	USM	LIB	ACA	SCC	WYD	WYD	WIL	MAM	USM	SAG	SAG	SAG	FER	SRC	PRO	CAA	CCU	DES	INT	MAQ
CH	GB	CH	GB	CH	Girabola		CH	Girabola								Champions		Girabola			Champions		GB	Champions		AC	GB	AC	Girabola							

== See also ==
- List of Atlético Petróleos de Luanda players
