= 2018 Atlético Petróleos de Luanda season =

Atlético Petróleos de Luanda
2018 season
- President: Tomás Faria
- Manager: Beto Bianchi (Jan 2016–)
- Stadium: Estádio 11 de Novembro
- Girabola: Runner-up
- CAF Confederation Cup: First round
- Top goalscorer: League: Azulão (20); All: Azulão (21)
- Biggest win: Petro 5–0 Security (10 Feb 2018)
- Biggest defeat: Petro 0–2 D'Agosto (22 Jul 2018)
Home colours	Away colours	Third colours
- All statistics correct as of 23 August 2018.

The 2018 season of Atlético Petróleos de Luanda is the club's 37th season in the Girabola, the Angolan Premier football League and 37th consecutive season in the top flight of Angolan football. In 2018, the club participated in the Girabola and the CAF Confederation Cup.

== J.G.M. withdrawal ==
In late April, J.G.M. submitted a withdrawal request to the Angolan Football Federation citing financial reasons. The request was granted. As a result, 3 points won by Petro in its round 8 away match win against J.G.M. were withdrawn.

== Squad information ==
=== Players ===
No.	Nat	Nick	Name	Pos	Date of birth (age)
Goalkeepers
1	(Angola)	Lamá	Luís Maimona João	–	1 February 1981 (aged 37)
12	(Angola)	Kizaca	Manuel Alexandre Domingos	–	0 December 1998 (aged 20)
22	(Angola)	Gerson	Gerson Bruno da Costa Barros	–	1 April 1987 (aged 31)
Defenders
2	(Angola)	Mira	Daniel João Zongo Macuenho	RB	12 February 1991 (aged 27)
3	(Angola)	Ary	Ariclene Assunção Oliveira	LB	6 August 1992 (aged 26)
4	(Angola)	Maludi	Maludi Francisco Caxala	CB	12 June 1993 (aged 25)
5	(Angola)	Élio	Élio Wilson Costa Martins	CM	20 December 1987 (aged 31)
6	(Angola)	Gomito	Nelson Sumbo Fonseca	CB	10 June 1991 (aged 27)
13	(Angola)	Eliseu	Eliseu Lucas Carlos Cabanga	LB	10 June 1991 (aged 27)
15	(Angola)	Wilson	Wilson Pinto Gaspar	CB	29 September 1990 (aged 28)
29	(Angola)	Danilson	Daniel José Kilola	CB	6 July 1999 (aged 19)
Midfielders
7	(Angola)	Diógenes	Diógenes Capemba João	CM	1 January 1997 (aged 21)
8	(Angola)	Carlinhos	Carlos Sténio do Carmo	MF	19 March 1995 (aged 23)
10	(Angola)	Manguxi	Augusto António Domingos Quibeto	RW	27 November 1991 (aged 27)
14	(Angola)	Mateus	Mateus Gaspar Domingos	RW	20 August 1993 (aged 25)
16	(Angola)	Benvindo	Benvindo Miguel André Afonso	MF	0 December 2002 (aged 16)
17	(Angola)	Nandinho	Fernando Bumba Mendes	MF	29 December 1994 (aged 24)
18	(Angola)	Herenilson	Herenilson Caifalo do Carmo	CM	23 May 1996 (aged 22)
20	(Brazil)	Diney	Valdisney Costa dos Santos	MF	2 March 1991 (aged 27)
21	(Angola)	Francis	Francisco Marta Agostinho da Rosa	MF	15 August 1993 (aged 25)
23	(Angola)	Tresor	Tresor Stanislau de Sousa	CM	10 February 1993 (aged 25)
24	(Angola)	Pedro	Pedro Domingos Agostinho	MF	30 July 2000 (aged 18)
27	(Angola)	Bugos	Roandro Ivan da Fonseca Semedo	MF	27 October 1990 (aged 28)
28	(Angola)	Mano Mano	Constantino Carlos António	MF	30 December 1999 (aged 19)
Forwards
9	(Nigeria)	Dennis	Dennis Sesugh	MF	11 August 1995 (aged 23)
11	(Angola)	Job	Ricardo Job Estévão	RW	27 September 1987 (aged 31)
19	(Brazil)	Tony	António Rosa Ribeiro	MF	6 October 1992 (aged 26)
26	(Brazil)	Azulão	Tiago Lima Leal	MF	26 March 1988 (aged 30)

=== Pre-season transfers ===
No.	Nat	Nick	Name	Pos	Date of Birth (Age)	
Transfers out To
25	(Angola)	Abdul	António Nzayinawo	LB	7 March 1994 (aged 24)	(Angola) Sagrada Esperança
23	(Angola)	Balacai	Evaristo Maurício Pascoal	LW	13 August 1995 (aged 23)	(Angola) Recreativo do Libolo
16	(Angola)	Bebo	Manuel João Miguel Costa	MF	3 June 1999 (aged 19)	(Angola) Académica do Lobito
21	(Angola)	Mabiná	José Pedro Alberto	RB	2 August 1983 (aged 35)	Career end
Transfers in From
27	(Angola)	Bugos	Roandro Ivan da Fonseca Semedo	LW	27 October 1990 (aged 28)	(Angola) Sagrada Esperança
29	(Angola)	Danilson	Daniel José Kilola	CB	6 July 1999 (aged 19)	Junior team
25	(Angola)	Eddie	Eddie Marcos Melo Afonso	LB	7 March 1994 (aged 24)	(Angola) Recreativo do Libolo
21	(Angola)	Francis	Francisco Marta Agostinho da Rosa	RB	15 August 1993 (aged 25)	(Angola) Sagrada Esperança
6	(Angola)	Gomito	Nelson Sumbo Fonseca	CB	10 June 1991 (aged 27)	(Angola) Recreativo do Libolo
16	(Brazil)	Harrison	Harrison Cardoso de Oliveira	CM	9 July 1992 (aged 26)	(Thailand) Rayong F.C.
12	(Angola)	Kizaca	Manuel Alexandre Domingos	GK	0 December 1998 (aged 20)	Junior team
28	(Angola)	Mano Mano	Constantino Carlos António	MF	30 December 1999 (aged 19)	Junior team
23	(Angola)	Tresor	Tresor Stanislau de Sousa	CM	10 February 1993 (aged 25)	(Angola) Sagrada Esperança

=== Mid-season transfers ===
No.	Nat	Nick	Name	Pos	Date of Birth (Age)	
Transfers out To
16	(Brazil)	Harrison	Harrison Cardoso de Oliveira	CM	9 July 1992 (aged 26)	–
Transfers in From
16	(Angola)	Benvindo	–	MF	0 December 2002 (aged 16)	Junior team

=== Staff ===
Nat	Name	Position(s)	Date of birth (age)
Technical staff
(Brazil)	Beto Bianchi	Head coach	6 November 1966 (aged 52)
(Angola)	Flávio Amado	Assistant coach	30 December 1979 (aged 39)
(Angola)	Jaime Silva Nejó	Assistant coach	25 July 1965 (aged 53)
(Brazil)	Adriano Soares	Goalkeeper coach	–
Medical
(Angola)	Nelson Bolivar	Physician	–
(Brazil)	Maurício Marques	Physio	–
(Angola)	Ramiro José	Masseur	–
Management
(Angola)	Tomás Faria	Chairman	–
(Angola)	Chico Afonso	Vice-chairman	–
(Angola)	Sidónio Malamba	Head of Foot Dept	–

== Overview ==
Competition	First match	Last match	Final position	Record							
Competition	First match	Last match	Final position	Pld	W	D	L	GF	GA	GD	Win %
Girabola	14 February 2018	2 September 2019	Runner-up	28	14	12	2	38	15	+23	50.00
CAF Confederation Cup	10 February 2018	16 March 2018	First round	4	1	2	1	6	2	+4	25.00
Total				32	15	14	3	44	17	+27	46.88

Last updated: 2 September 2018

== Angolan League ==
=== League table ===
Pos	Team	Pld	W	D	L	GF	GA	GD	Pts	Qualification or relegation
1	Primeiro de Agosto (C)	28	15	12	1	31	8	+23	57	Qualification for Champions League
2	Petro de Luanda	28	14	12	2	38	15	+23	54	Qualification for Confederation Cup (Note: Due to the fact that this season's cup was not held.)
3	Interclube	28	12	6	10	32	23	+9	42	
4	Recreativo do Libolo	28	10	10	8	28	26	+2	40	
5	Académica do Lobito	28	9	11	8	19	21	−2	38	

Updated to match(es) played on 2 September 2018. Source: Girabola.com
Rules for classification: 1) Points; 2) Head-to-head points; 3) Head-to-head goal difference; 4) Goal difference; 5) Goals scored; 6) Fair-play points; 7) Play-off.
(C) Champions

=== Results ===
==== Results summary ====
Overall								Home						Away					
Pld	W	D	L	GF	GA	GD	Pts	W	D	L	GF	GA	GD	W	D	L	GF	GA	GD
28	14	12	2	38	15	+23	54	8	5	1	18	7	+11	6	7	1	20	8	+12

Last updated: 2 September 2018.

==== Results by round ====
Round	1	2	3	4	5	6	7	8	9	10	11	12	13	14	15	16	17	18	19	20	21	22	23	24	25	26	27	28	29	30
Ground	H	A	H	A	H	A	H	A	H	A	A	H	A	H	A	A	H	A	H	A	H	A	H	A	H	H	A	H	A	H
Result	W	D	D	W	D	W	W		D	D	L	W	D	W	W	D	D	W	W	D	W	D		D	L	W	W	W	W	D
Position	1	1	4	2	3	2	2		2	2	3	3	3	2	2	2	2	2	1	2	1	1		1	3	2	2	2	2	2

Updated to match(es) played on 2 September 2018. Source: girabolazap.co.ao
A = Away; H = Home; W = Win; D = Draw; L = Loss

==== Results overview ====
Win Draw Loss

Team	Home score	Away score
Cuando Cubango FC	4–0	0-0
Progresso do Sambizanga	1-1	2-2
Primeiro de Maio	0-0	2–1
Bravos do Maquis	1–0	3–0
Académica do Lobito	0-0	0-0
Kabuscorp	1–0	3–0
Sporting de Cabinda	3–1	1-1
J.G.M.		
Recreativo do Libolo	0-0	2-2
1º de Agosto	0-2	0-0
Recreativo da Caála	2–1	0-1
Domant FC	1–0	4–1
Desportivo da Huíla	2–0	0-0
Interclube	2–1	2–0
Sagrada Esperança	1-1	1–0

=== Match details ===
Wed, 14 Feb 2018 01	Petro Atlético	4–0	Cuando Cubango FC	11 de Novembro, Luanda
16:00 WAT (UTC+1)	Élio 30'; Azulão 46', 83'; Harrison 62'	Report		Referee: João Goma; Ivanildo Lopes, Evanildo Martins
Note: Lamá / Diógenes (substituted off) 44', Eddie, Élio, Wilson / Harrison, Herenilson, Job (c) (substituted off) 64', Tresor / Azulão, Diney (substituted off) 68' — Ary (substituted on) 44', Tony (substituted on) 64', Carlinhos (substituted on) 68'

Sat, 24 Feb 2018 03	Petro Atlético	0–0	1º de Maio	11 de Novembro, Luanda
17:30 WAT (UTC+1)				Referee: Ailton Carmelino; Evanildo Martins, Aldair Carmelino
Note: Gerson / Eddie, Élio, Mira, Wilson (c) / Bugos (substituted off) 45', Herenilson, Manguxi, Mateus (substituted off) / Azulão, Harrison (substituted off) 75' — Diney (substituted on) 45', Tony (substituted on) 75', Dennis (substituted on)

Wed, 28 Feb 2018 04	Bravos Maquis	0–3	Petro Atlético	Mundunduleno, Luena
15:00 WAT (UTC+1)		Report	67' (pen.) Azulão; 90' Tony; 90+4' Francis	Referee: António Caxala; Evanildo Martins, Luís Mateus
Note: Gerson / Eddie, Élio, Mira, Wilson (c) / Diney (substituted off) 80', Herenilson, Manguxi, Tresor / Azulão (substituted off) 84', Harrison (substituted off) 33' — Francis (substituted on) 33', Tony (substituted on) 80', Carlinhos (substituted on) 84'

Sat, 10 Mar 2018 05	Petro Atlético	0–0	Académica	11 de Novembro, Luanda
16:00 WAT (UTC+1)		Report		Referee: Miguel Mateus; Celso António, Domingos Francisco
Note: Gerson / Eddie, Élio, Mira, Wilson / Herenilson (substituted off) 45', Job (c), Manguxi (substituted off) 70', Tresor / Azulão, Tony (substituted off) 46' — Carlinhos (substituted on) 45', Mateus (substituted on) 46', Dennis (substituted on) 70'

Fri, 30 Mar 2018 08	J.G.M.	Annulled (originally 0–1)	Petro Atlético	Kurikutelas, Huambo
15:00 WAT (UTC+1)		Report	78' Azulão	Referee: Tânia Duarte; Andália Jeremias, Luisa Luhaco
Note: Gerson / Ary, Élio, Mira, Wilson / Herenilson, Job (c) (substituted off) 87', Manguxi, Mateus (substituted off) 51' / Azulão, Diney (substituted off) 55' — Tony (substituted on) 51', Manguxi (substituted on) 55', Eddie (substituted on) 87'

Wed, 04 Apr 2018 02	Progresso	2–2	Petro Atlético	Coqueiros, Luanda
15:30 WAT (UTC+1)	Yano 51', 59'	Report	(red card) 65' Job; 85' (pen.) Azulão; 90+6' Élio	Referee: António Caxala; Júlio Lemos, Joaquim da Rocha
Note: Gerson / Ary, Élio, Mira, Wilson (substituted off) 56' / Herenilson, Job (c), Mateus (substituted off) 45', Pedro / Azulão, Diney (substituted off) 64' — Tony (substituted on) 45', Danilson (substituted on) 56', Manguxi (substituted on) 64'

Sun, 08 Apr 2018 09	Petro Atlético	0–0	Rec do Libolo	11 de Novembro, Luanda
17:30 WAT (UTC+1)		Report		Referee: Pedro dos Santos; Pedro Futa, Luís Mateus
Note: Gerson / Ary, Danilson, Élio, Mira / Carlinhos, Eddie (substituted off) 69', Herenilson, Manguxi / Azulão (c), Pedro (substituted off) 45' — Diney (substituted on) 45', Nandinho (substituted on) 69'

Sat, 14 Apr 2018 10	1º de Agosto	0–0	Petro Atlético	11 de Novembro, Luanda
17:00 WAT (UTC+1)		Report		Referee: Rodrigues Aleixo; Júlio Lemos, Ivanildo Lopes
Note: Gerson / Ary, Danilson, Élio, Mira / Eddie, Herenilson (substituted off) 90+2', Manguxi, Tresor / Azulão (c), Francis (substituted off) 78' — Mateus (substituted on) 78', Diney (substituted on) 90+2'

Sat, 21 Apr 2018 11	Rec da Caála	1–0	Petro Atlético	Mártires da Canhala, Caála
15:00 WAT (UTC+1)	Deco 49'	Report		Referee: José Maxia; Cláudio Vunge, Celestino Golombole
Note: Gerson / Danilson, Eddie, Élio, Mira / Francis (substituted off) 73', Herenilson, Tony, Tresor (substituted off) 26' / Azulão (c), Dennis (substituted off) 27' — Pedro (substituted on) 26', Nandinho (substituted on) 27', Mateus (substituted on) 73'

Wed, 25 Apr 2018 12	Petro Atlético	1–0	Domant FC	11 de Novembro, Luanda
17:00 WAT (UTC+1)	Élio (red card) 63'; Azulão 86'			Referee: Bernardo Nangolo; Pedro Alberto, António Livongue
Note: Gerson / Ary, Danilson (substituted off) 73', Élio, Mira / Carlinhos, Diney (substituted off) 46', Herenilson, Job / Azulão (c), Tony (substituted off) 84' — Mateus (substituted on) 46', Maludi (substituted on) 73', Pedro (substituted on) 84'

Mon, 30 Apr 2018 13	Desportivo Huíla	0–0	Petro Atlético	Estádio do Ferrovia, Lubango
15:00 WAT (UTC+1)				Referee: Nuno Eduardo; Manuel Benguela, Nilton Armando
Note: Gerson / Ary, Danilson, Mira, Wilson / Carlinhos, Diney, Herenilson (substituted off) 71', Job (substituted off) 90+3' / Azulão (c) (substituted off) 23', Tony — Mateus (substituted on) 23', Maludi (substituted on) 71', Eddie (substituted on) 90+3'

Sun, 06 May 2018 14	Petro Atlético	2–1	Interclube	11 de Novembro, Luanda
16:00 WAT (UTC+1)	Carlinhos 7'; Tony 67'	Report	61' Kaporal	Referee: António Dungula; Jerson Emiliano, Wilson Ntyamba
Note: Gerson / Ary, Maludi, Mira, Wilson (c) / Carlinhos, Diney, Eddie (substituted off) 77', Herenilson, Job / Tony (substituted off) 84' — Pedro (substituted on) 77', Nandinho (substituted on) 84'

Sun, 13 May 2018 15	Sagrada	0–1	Petro Atlético	Sagrada Esperança, Dundo
15:00 WAT (UTC+1)		Report	48' Élio	Referee: José Chitumba; Jeremias Cafussa, Elias Calei
Note: Gerson / Ary, Élio, Maludi, Mira / Carlinhos (substituted off) 88', Diney, Eddie, Herenilson, Job (c) (substituted off) 83' / Tony — Francis (substituted on) 83', Tresor (substituted on) 88'

Sat, 19 May 2018 06	Kabuscorp	0–3	Petro Atlético	11 de Novembro, Luanda
17:30 WAT (UTC+1)		Report	66' Maludi; 71', 90+1' Azulão	Referee: Pedro dos Santos; Júlio Lemos, Luís Mateus
Note: Gerson / Ary, Élio, Maludi, Mira / Carlinhos (substituted off) 72', Diney, Eddie (substituted off) 56', Herenilson, Job (c) / Tony (substituted off) 76' — Azulão (substituted on) 56', Tresor (substituted on) 72', Francis (substituted on) 76'

Thu, 24 May 2018 07	Petro Atlético	3–1	Sporting Cabinda	11 de Novembro, Luanda
16:00 WAT (UTC+1)	Azulão 9', 22', 63'	Report	79' Gláucio I	Referee: Benjamin Andrade; Tito Capingala, José Siliya
Note: Gerson / Ary, Eddie, Maludi, Wilson / Carlinhos (substituted off) 61', Diney (substituted off) 73', Herenilson, Job (c) / Azulão (substituted off) 75', Tony — Tresor (substituted on) 61', Francis (substituted on) 73', Dennis (substituted on) 75'

Sat, 09 Jun 2018 16	Cuando Cubango FC	0–0	Petro Atlético	Municipal, Menongue
15:00 WAT (UTC+1)		Report		Referee: Benjamin Andrade; Bernabé Ngulo, José Siliya
Note: Gerson / Ary, Eddie, Maludi, Wilson / Carlinhos (substituted off) 46', Diney (substituted off) 85', Herenilson, Job (c) (substituted off) 77' / Azulão, Tony — Tresor (substituted on) 46', Diógenes (substituted on) 77', Dennis (substituted on) 85'

Sat, 16 Jun 2018 17	Petro Atlético	1–1	Progresso	11 de Novembro, Luanda
16:00 WAT (UTC+1)	Azulão 14'	Report	80' (pen.) Yano	Referee: Aldair Carmelino; Evanildo Lopes, Ivanildo Martins
Note: Gerson / Ary, Eddie, Élio, Wilson / Carlinhos (substituted off) 60', Diney (substituted off) 71', Herenilson, Job / Azulão, Tony (substituted off) 56' — Diógenes (substituted on) 56', Tresor (substituted on) 60', Pedro (substituted on) 71'

Sun, 24 Jun 2018 18	1º de Maio	1–2	Petro Atlético	Edelfride Costa, Benguela
16:00 WAT (UTC+1)	Telmo 72'	Report	61' Dennis; 78' Nandinho	Referee: Paulo Sérgio; Segunda Tchisseque, Ilídio Coimbra
Note: Gerson / Ary, Eddie, Élio, Wilson / Diógenes, Francis (substituted off) 57', Herenilson, Tresor / Azulão (substituted off) 78', Dennis (substituted off) 86' — Mateus (substituted on) 57', Nandinho (substituted on) 78', Diney (substituted on) 86'

Wed, 27 Jun 2018 19	Petro Atlético	1–0	Bravos Maquis	11 de Novembro, Luanda
17:30 WAT (UTC+1)	Azulão 53'			Referee: Rodrigues Aleixo; Nicodemos Calembela, Francisco Paulo
Note: Gerson / Danilson, Eddie, Élio, Wilson / Diógenes, Francis (substituted off) 46', Herenilson, Tresor / Azulão (substituted off) 90+2', Dennis (substituted off) 90+4' — Job (substituted on) 46', Maludi (substituted on) 90+2', Pedro (substituted on) 90+4'

Sun, 01 Jul 2018 20	Académica	0–0	Petro Atlético	Ombaka, Benguela
15:00 WAT (UTC+1)		Report		Referee: Feliciano Lucas; Horácio Tchissingue, Alexandre Bengue
Note: Gerson / Danilson, Eddie (substituted off) 84', Élio, Wilson (c) / Diógenes, Francis (substituted off) 56', Herenilson, Tresor / Azulão, Dennis — Job (substituted on) 56', Nandinho (substituted on) 84'

Thu, 05 Jul 2018 21	Petro Atlético	1–0	Kabuscorp	11 de Novembro, Luanda
16:00 WAT (UTC+1)	Azulão 84'			Referee: João Goma; José Felix, Dário Gaspar
Note: Gerson / Danilson, Diógenes, Élio, Wilson / Francis (substituted off) 75', Herenilson, Job (c), Tresor / Azulão (substituted off) 90+4', Dennis (substituted off) 76' — Mateus (substituted on) 75', Tony (substituted on) 76', Nandinho (substituted on) 90+4'

Sun, 08 Jul 2018 22	Sporting Cabinda	1–1	Petro Atlético	Tafe, Cabinda
15:00 WAT (UTC+1)	Castro 30'		70' Tony	Referee: Paulo Talaia; Ricardo Daniel, Joaquim Chio
Note: Gerson / Danilson, Diógenes, Élio, Maludi (substituted off) / Francis (substituted off) , Herenilson, Job (c), Tresor / Azulão, Dennis (substituted off) — Tony (substituted on) , Nandinho (substituted on) , Mateus (substituted on)

Sun, 15 Jul 2018 23	Petro Atlético	Cancelled	J.G.M.	11 de Novembro, Luanda
16:00 WAT (UTC+1)

Wed, 18 Jul 2018 24	Rec do Libolo	2–2	Petro Atlético	Estádio Municipal, Calulo
15:00 WAT (UTC+1)	Magrão 37' (pen.), 90+4' (pen.)		64' (pen.), 81' (pen.) Azulão	Referee: Rodrigues Aleixo; Nicodemos Calembela, Francisco Paulo
Note: Gerson / Danilson, Diógenes, Élio, Wilson / Eddie (substituted off) 58', Francis (substituted off) 46', Herenilson, Job (c) (substituted off) 89', Tresor / Azulão — Tony (substituted on) 46', Mateus (substituted on) 58', Mira (substituted on) 89'

Sun, 22 Jul 2018 25	Petro Atlético	0–2	1º de Agosto	11 de Novembro, Luanda
16:00 WAT (UTC+1)		Report	2' Razaq; 27' Mário	Referee: Hélder Martins; Jerson Emiliano, Wilson Ntyamba
Note: Gerson / Diógenes, Eddie, Élio, Maludi (substituted off) 87' / Diney (substituted off) 46', Job (c) Mateus, Tresor (substituted off) 71' / Azulão, Pedro — Carlinhos (substituted on) 46', Tony (substituted on) 71', Nandinho (substituted on) 87'

Sat, 28 Jul 2018 26	Petro Atlético	2–1	Rec da Caála	11 de Novembro, Luanda
17:00 WAT (UTC+1)	Azulão 64'; Job 64'		68' Deco	Referee: Paulo Sérgio; Segunda Tchisseque, Lídio Coimbra
Note: Gerson / Eddie, Élio, Mira, Wilson / Carlinhos (substituted off) 46', Herenilson, Mateus, Pedro (substituted off) 45', Tony (substituted off) 72' / Azulão — Diney (substituted on) 45', Job (substituted on) 46', Francis (substituted on) 72'

Thu, 02 Aug 2018 27	Domant FC	1–4	Petro Atlético	Municipal, Caxito
15:00 WAT (UTC+1)	Mabululu 72'	Report	20' Diney; 24' (o.g.) Cabetula; 63', 73' Azulão	Referee: Nuno Eduardo; Manuel Benguela, Nilton Armando
Note: Gerson / Eddie, Élio, Mira, Wilson / Diney, Herenilson, (substituted off) 88', Job (c) (substituted off) 86', Mateus (substituted off) 81', Tony / Azulão — Francis (substituted on) 81', Bebo (substituted on) 86', Tresor (substituted on) 88'

Sat, 11 Aug 2018 28	Petro Atlético	2–0	Desportivo Huíla	11 de Novembro, Luanda
16:10 WAT (UTC+1)	Tony 51'; Azulão 82'	Report		Referee: Pedro Santos; Júlio Lemos, Pedro Futa
Note: Gerson / Eddie, Élio, Mira, Wilson / Diney, Herenilson, Job (c) (substituted off) 88', Mateus (substituted off) 78' / Azulão, Tony (substituted off) 90+3' — Tresor (substituted on) 78', Francis (substituted on) 88', Diógenes (substituted on) 90+3'

Thu, 23 Aug 2018 29	Interclube	0–2	Petro Atlético	22 de Junho, Luanda
15:00 WAT (UTC+1)		Report	56' Mateus; 84' Azulão	Referee: João Goma; Luís Mateus, Joaquim da Rocha
Note: Gerson / Danilson, Eddie, Mira, Wilson / Diney (substituted off) 90+2', Herenilson, Job (c) (substituted off) 71', Mateus (substituted off) 68' / Azulão, Tony — Francis (substituted on) 68', Carlinhos (substituted on) 71', Pedro (substituted on) 90+2'

Sun, 02 Sep 2018 30	Petro Atlético	1–1	Sagrada	11 de Novembro, Luanda
15:00 WAT (UTC+1)	Tony 54'	Report	61' Cachi	Referee: António Dungula; Evanildo Martins, Evanildo Lopes
Note: Gerson / Eddie, Élio, Mira, Wilson (substituted off) 70' / Diney (substituted off) 46', Herenilson, Job (c), Mateus (substituted off) 54' / Azulão, Tony — Danilson (substituted on) 46', Carlinhos (substituted on) 54', Dennis (substituted on) 70'

== CAF Confederation Cup ==
=== Results summary ===
Overall								Home						Away					
Pld	W	D	L	GF	GA	GD	Pts	W	D	L	GF	GA	GD	W	D	L	GF	GA	GD
4	1	2	1	6	2	+4	5	1	1	0	5	0	+5	0	1	1	1	2	−1

Last updated: 16 Mar 2018.

=== First round ===
Fri, 16 Mar 2018 R1 2L	SuperSport United (South Africa)	2–1	(Angola) Petro Atlético	Lucas Moripe, Pretoria
19:00 SAST (UTC+2)	Mnyamane 77', 82'	Report	49' Élio	Referee: Wisdom Chewe; Amos Chalwe, Oliver Mweene (Zambia)
Note: Gerson / Ary, Élio, Mira, Wilson / Carlinhos, Herenilson, Job (c) (substituted off) 61', Manguxi / Azulão (substituted off) 81', Diney (substituted off) 79' — Tresor (substituted on) 61', Tony (substituted on) 79', Dennis (substituted on) 81'

Tue, 06 Mar 2018 R1 1L	Petro Atlético (Angola)	0–0	(South Africa) SuperSport United	11 de Novembro, Luanda
16:00 WAT (UTC+1)		Report		Referee: Simões Guambe; Arsénio Marengula, Zacarias Baloi (Mozambique)
Note: Gerson / Ary, Élio, Mira, Wilson / Carlinhos (substituted off) 61', Herenilson, Job (c), Tresor (substituted off) 86' / Azulão, Diney (substituted off) 72' — Tony (substituted on) 61', Manguxi (substituted on) 72', Francis (substituted on) 86'

=== Preliminary round ===
Tue, 20 Feb 2018 PR 2L	Masters Security (Malawi)	0–0	(Angola) Petro Atlético	Kamuzu Stadium, Blantyre
14:30 CAT (UTC+2)		Report		Referee: Elly Sasii; Salim Mohamed, Ferdinand Chacha (Tanzania)
Note: Gerson / Ary, Gomito, Mira, Wilson / Diney (substituted off) 70', Francis (substituted off) 65', Herenilson, Tresor / Azulão (substituted off) 80', Tony — Bugos (substituted on) 65', Manguxi (substituted on) 70', Dennis (substituted on) 80'

Sat, 10 Feb 2018 PR 1L	Petro Atlético (Angola)	5–0	(Malawi) Masters Security	11 de Novembro, Luanda
16:00 WAT (UTC+1)	Azulão 40'; Tony 74', 77', 84'; Diney 90+3'	Report		Referee: Jonas Shongedi; David Shaanika, Christof Vries (Namibia)
Note: Gerson / Diógenes, Élio, Mira, Wilson / Carlinhos (substituted off) 56', Herenilson, Job (c), Mateus (substituted off) 68' / Azulão (substituted off) 80', Diney — Manguxi (substituted on) 56', Tony (substituted on) 68', Dennis (substituted on) 80'

== Season statistics ==
=== Appearances and goals ===
No.	Pos	Nat	Player	Total		League		Confed	
No.	Pos	Nat	Player	Apps	Goals	Apps	Goals	Apps	Goals
Goalkeepers
1	GK	(Angola) ANG	Lamá	1	0	1	0	0	0
22	GK	(Angola) ANG	Gerson	31	0	27	0	4	0
Defenders
2	DF	(Angola) ANG	Mira	21	0	16+1	0	4	0
3	DF	(Angola) ANG	Ary	16	0	12+1	0	3	0
4	DF	(Angola) ANG	Maludi	11	1	8+3	1	0	0
5	DF	(Angola) ANG	Élio	27	4	23	3	4	1
7	DF	(Angola) ANG	Diógenes	13	0	9+3	0	1	0
15	DF	(Angola) ANG	Wilson	24	0	20	0	4	0
25	DF	(Angola) ANG	Eddie	23	0	23	0	0	0
29	DF	(Angola) ANG	Danilson	13	0	11+2	0	0	0
Midfielders
8	MF	(Angola) ANG	Carlinhos	19	1	10+6	1	3	0
10	MF	(Angola) ANG	Manguxi	10	0	5+1	0	1+3	0
11	MF	(Angola) ANG	Job	25	1	19+3	1	3	0
14	MF	(Angola) ANG	Mateus	18	1	8+9	1	1	0
16	MF	(Angola) ANG	Benvindo	1	0	0+1	0	0	0
17	MF	(Angola) ANG	Nandinho	8	1	0+8	1	0	0
18	MF	(Angola) ANG	Herenilson	30	0	26	0	4	0
20	MF	(Brazil) BRA	Diney	26	2	17+5	1	4	1
21	MF	(Angola) ANG	Francis	18	1	8+8	1	1+1	0
23	MF	(Angola) ANG	Tresor	22	0	12+7	0	2+1	0
27	MF	(Angola) ANG	Bugos	2	0	1	0	0+1	0
Forwards
9	FW	(Nigeria) NGR	Dennis	14	1	6+5	1	0+3	0
16	FW	(Brazil) BRA	Harrison	3	1	3	1	0	0
19	FW	(Brazil) BRA	Tony	27	8	15+8	5	1+3	3
24	FW	(Angola) ANG	Pedro	10	0	4+6	0	0	0
26	FW	(Brazil) BRA	Azulão	30	21	25+1	20	4	1
Opponents
–	DF	(Angola) ANG	Cabetula	1	1	1	1	0	0
Total
Total				352(90)	44	308(78)	38	44(12)	6

=== Scorers ===
As of 2 September 2018

Rank	Name	League		Confed		Total	
Rank	Name	Apps	Goals	Apps	Goals	Apps	Goals
1	(Brazil) Azulão	25(1)	20	4	1	29(1)	21
2	(Brazil) Tony	15(8)	5	1(3)	3	16(11)	8
3	(Angola) Élio	23	3	4	1	27	4
4	(Brazil) Diney	17(5)	1	4	1	21(5)	2
5	(Angola) Nandinho	(8)	1	0	0	(8)	1
6	(Brazil) Harrison	3	1	0	0	3	1
7	(Nigeria) Dennis	6(5)	1	(3)	0	6(8)	1
8	(Angola) Maludi	8(3)	1	0	0	8(3)	1
9	(Angola) Mateus	8(9)	1	1	0	9(9)	1
10	(Angola) Francis	8(8)	1	1(1)	0	9(9)	1
11	(Angola) Carlinhos	10(6)	1	3	0	13(6)	1
12	(Angola) Job	19(3)	1	3	0	22(3)	1
Own goal for		–	1	–		–	1
Total		–	38	–	6	–	44

- Note: Numbers in parentheses indicate appearances as substitute.

=== Clean sheets ===
As of 2 September 2018

Rank	Name	League		Confed		Total		%
		Apps	CS	Apps	CS	Apps	CS	
1	(Angola) Gerson	27	15	4	3	31	18	58
2	(Angola) Lamá	1	1	0	0	1	1	100
3	(Angola) Kizaca	0	0	0	0	0	0	
Total			16		3		19	

== See also ==
- List of Atlético Petróleos de Luanda players
