= Vá (footballer) =

Angolan footballer (born 1998)

Personal information
- Full name: Vladimiro Etson António Félix
- Date of birth: 24 August 1998 (age 28)
- Place of birth: Cambambe, Cuanza Norte, Angola
- Height: 1.65 m (5 ft 5 in)
- Position: Forward

Team information
- Current team: Lillestrøm
- Number: 20

Youth career
- Progresso Sambizanga

Senior career*
Years	Team	Apps	(Gls)
2016–2018	Progresso Sambizanga	21	(6)
2018–2019	Leixões	3	(0)
2019	Petro de Luanda	17	(5)
2019–2022	Pafos	39	(6)
2022–2023	Apollon Limassol	26	(2)
2023–2024	Djurgårdens IF	11	(2)
2024	→ Lillestrøm (loan)	5	(1)
2024–	Lillestrøm	54	(10)

International career^{‡}
- Angola U20
2016–2020	Angola	31	(2)
- * Club domestic league appearances and goals as of 23 July 2026 ‡ National team caps and goals as of 3 February 2020

Vladimiro Etson António Félix (born 24 August 1998), commonly known as Vá, is an Angolan professional footballer who plays as a forward for Lillestrøm.

== Career ==
In 2018–19, he signed in for Petro de Luanda.

In March 2024, Vá joined Eliteserien club Lillestrøm on loan until the summer transfer window.

== Career statistics ==
As of match played on 8 November 2025

Club statistics
Club	Season	League			National Cup		Continental		Other		Total	
Club	Season	Division	Apps	Goals	Apps	Goals	Apps	Goals	Apps	Goals	Apps	Goals
Leixões	2018–19	LigaPro	3	0	0	0	—		—		3	0
Petro de Luanda	2018–19	Girabola	17	5	0	0	8 (Note: Appearances in the CAF Confederation Cup)	4	—		25	9
Pafos	2019–20	Cypriot First Division	16	2	1	0	—		—		17	2
Pafos	2020–21	Cypriot First Division	23	4	2	1	—		—		25	5
Pafos	Total		39	6	3	1	0	0	0	0	42	7
Apollon Limassol	2022–23	Cypriot First Division	26	2	1	0	6 (Note: Two Appearances in each the UEFA Champions League, UEFA Europa League and UEFA Europa Conference League)	0	1 (Note: Appearance in the Cypriot Super Cup)	1	34	3
Djurgårdens IF	2023	Allsvenskan	11	2	3	0	—		—		14	2
Lillestrøm (loan)	2024	Eliteserien	5	1	4	3	—		—		9	4
Lillestrøm	2024	Eliteserien	20	3	1	0	—		—		21	3
Lillestrøm	2025	OBOS-ligaen	20	4	4	4	—		—		24	8
Lillestrøm	Total		45	8	9	7	0	0	0	0	54	15
Career totals			141	23	16	8	14	4	1	1	172	36

== International career ==
At the youth level he played in the 2016 COSAFA U-20 Cup.

=== International goals ===
Scores and results list Angola's goal tally first.

No	Date	Venue	Opponent	Score	Result	Competition
1.	23 July 2017	Estádio 11 de Novembro, Luanda, Angola	Mauritius	3–2	3–2	2018 African Nations Championship qualification
2.	28 January 2018	Stade Ibn Batouta, Tangier, Morocco	Nigeria	1–0	1–2 (a.e.t.)	2018 African Nations Championship
