= Pedro Agostinho (footballer) =

Angolan footballer (born 2000)

Personal information
- Full name: Pedro Domingos Agostinho
- Date of birth: 30 July 2000 (age 26)
- Place of birth: Luanda, Angola
- Position: Midfielder

Team information
- Current team: Petro Luanda
- Number: 24

Senior career*
| Years | Team | Apps | (Gls) |
| 2017– | Petro Luanda | 14 | (0) |

International career^{‡}
| 2018– | Angola | 2 | (0) |
Medal record
Men's football
Representing Angola
COSAFA Cup
| Winner | 2024 South Africa |
Petro Luanda
| Winner | Girabola | 2017 |
- * Club domestic league appearances and goals as of 15:44, 9 July 2019 (UTC) ‡ National team caps and goals as of 15:44, 9 July 2019 (UTC)

Pedro Domingos Agostinho (born 30 July 2000) is an Angolan footballer who currently plays as a midfielder for Petro Luanda.

== Career statistics ==
=== Club ===
As of 9 July 2019.

| Club | Season | League | | | Cup | | Continental | | Other | | Total | |
| Club | Season | Division | Apps | Goals | Apps | Goals | Apps | Goals | Apps | Goals | Apps | Goals |
|---|---|---|---|---|---|---|---|---|---|---|---|---|
| Petro Luanda | 2017 | Girabola | 2 | 0 | 1 (Note: Appearances in the Taça de Angola) | 0 | – | | 0 | 0 | 3 | 0 |
| Petro Luanda | 2018 | Girabola | 9 | 0 | 0 | 0 | 0 | 0 | 0 | 0 | 9 | 0 |
| Petro Luanda | 2018–19 | Girabola | 3 | 0 | 0 | 0 | 1 (Note: Appearances in the CAF Confederation Cup) | 0 | 0 | 0 | 4 | 0 |
| Career total | | | 14 | 0 | 1 | 0 | 1 | 0 | 0 | 0 | 16 | 0 |

=== International ===
As of matches played 29 July 2018.

| National team | Year | Apps | Goals |
|---|---|---|---|
| Angola | 2018 | 2 | 0 |
| Total | | 2 | 0 |
