= Além (footballer) =

Angolan footballer (born 1997)

Personal information
- Full name: Alberto Adão Campos Miguel
- Date of birth: 6 December 1997 (age 28)
- Place of birth: Luanda, Angola
- Position: Midfielder

Team information
- Current team: Interclube
- Number: 4

Youth career
- –2017: Petro Atlético

Senior career*
Years	Team	Apps	(Gls)
2018–2017	Progresso Associação do Sambizanga	16	(0)
2018-2022	Petro de Luanda	89	(0)
2022-	Interclube	114	(12)

International career^{‡}
2017	Angola U20	3	(0)
2016–	Angola	18	(1)
- * Club domestic league appearances and goals as of 11:44, 9 July 2019 (UTC) ‡ National team caps and goals as of 11:44, 17 June 2026 (UTC)

Alberto Adão Campos Miguel (born 6 December 1997), commonly known as Além, is an Angolan footballer who currently plays as a midfielder for 1º de Agosto.

== Career statistics ==
=== Club ===
As of 9 July 2019.

Club	Season	League			Cup		Continental		Other		Total	
Club	Season	Division	Apps	Goals	Apps	Goals	Apps	Goals	Apps	Goals	Apps	Goals
1º de Agosto	2018	Girabola	16	0	0	0	–		0	0	16	0
1º de Agosto	2018–19	Girabola	19	0	2 (Note: Appearances in the Taça de Angola)	0	9 (Note: Appearances in the CAF Confederation Cup)	0	0	0	30	0
Career total			35	0	2	0	9	0	0	0	46	0

=== International ===
As of matches played 14 August 2025.

National team	Year	Apps	Goals
Angola	2016	1	0
Angola	2017	0	0
Angola	2018	1	0
Angola	2019	0	0
Angola	2020	0	0
Angola	2021	0	0
Angola	2022	2	0
Angola	2023	3	0
Angola	2024	2	0
Angola	2025	9	1
Total		18	1

=== International goals ===
Scores and results list Angola's goal tally first.

No.	Date	Venue	Opponent	Score	Result	Competition
1.	13 June 2025	Free State Stadium, Bloemfontein, South Africa	Madagascar	4–0	4–1	2025 COSAFA Cup
