= Herenilson =

Angolan footballer (born 1996)

Personal information
- Full name: Herenilson Caifalo do Carmo
- Date of birth: 27 August 1996 (age 30)
- Place of birth: Luanda, Angola
- Height: 1.78 m (5 ft 10 in)
- Position: Midfielder

Team information
- Current team: Al-Karma

Senior career*
Years	Team	Apps	(Gls)
2016–2020	Petro Luanda	104	(2)
2020–2023	Primeiro de Agosto		
2023–2024	Al Ahli Tripoli		
2024–	Al-Karma		

International career^{‡}
2016–2020	Angola	30	(0)
- * Club domestic league appearances and goals as of 11:44, 9 July 2019 (UTC) ‡ National team caps and goals as of 10:44, 6 October 2019

Herenilson Caifalo do Carmo (born 27 August 1996), commonly known as Herenilson, is an Angolan footballer who plays as a midfielder for Iraq Stars League club Al-Karma.

In October 2020, he signed a one-year deal with Angolan side Primeiro de Agosto.

== Career statistics ==
=== Club ===
As of 9 June 2019.

Club	Season	League			Cup		Continental		Other		Total	
Club	Season	Division	Apps	Goals	Apps	Goals	Apps	Goals	Apps	Goals	Apps	Goals
Petro Luanda	2016	Girabola	26	1	2 (Note: Appearances in the Taça de Angola)	0	–		0	0	28	1
Petro Luanda	2017	Girabola	25	0	5	0	–		0	0	30	0
Petro Luanda	2018	Girabola	26	0	0	0	4 (Note: Appearances in the CAF Confederation Cup)	0	0	0	16	0
Petro Luanda	2018–19	Girabola	27	1	3	0	11	0	0	0	41	1
Career total			104	2	10	0	15	0	0	0	129	2

=== International ===
As of matches played 21 May 2018.

National team	Year	Apps	Goals
Angola	2016	2	0
Angola	2017	10	0
Angola	2018	9	0
Angola	2019	9	0
Total		30	0
