= Elber Binha =

Cape Verdean footballer (born 1991)

Personal information
- Full name: Jorge Mota Faial Delgado
- Date of birth: June 24, 1991 (age 35)
- Place of birth: Mindelo, Cape Verde
- Height: 1.85 m (6 ft 1 in)
- Position: Goalkeeper

Team information
- Current team: Interclube

Senior career*
Years	Team	Apps	(Gls)
2013–2014	Primeiro de Maio	8	(0)
2014–2017	Benfica Luanda	34	(0)
2017–2018	Kabuscorp	35	(0)
2018–2021	Petro de Luanda	75	(0)
2021–	Interclube	11	(0)

International career^{‡}
2009	Cape Verde U21	1	(0)
2014	Angola	1	(0)
2022	Cape Verde	1	(0)
- * Club domestic league appearances and goals as of 21 October 2021 ‡ National team caps and goals as of 25 March 2022

Jorge Mota Faial Delgado (born 24 June 1991), known as Elber Binha or just Elber, is a Cape Verdean footballer who plays as a goalkeeper for the Angolan club Interclube. A one-time international for Angola, he went on to earn one cap for the Cape Verde national team in 2022.

== Professional career ==
Elber Binha spent his entire senior career in Angola in the Girabola. He began his senior career with Primeiro de Maio in 2014, with stints at Benfica Luanda, Kabuscorp and Petro de Luanda. He was a candidate for Goalkeeper of the Year and Championship Player of the Year with Petro de Luanda in 2021. On 31 December 2021, he transferred to Interclube signing a 2-year contract.

== International career ==
Elber Binha is a youth international of Cape Verde, having represented the Cape Verde U21s in 2009. He spent his entire senior playing career in Angola, and was naturalized as a citizen. He debuted with the Angola national team in a 1–1 friendly tie with Iran on 30 May 2014. He switched to represent the Cape Verde national team in 2022. He debuted with Cape Verde in a friendly 6–0 win over Liechtenstein on 25 March 2022.

== Honour ==
Benfica Luanda

- Taça de Angola: 2014
