= Tiago Azulão =

Brazilian footballer (born 1986)

Personal information
- Full name: Tiago Lima Leal
- Date of birth: 26 March 1988 (age 38)
- Place of birth: São Paulo, Brazil
- Height: 1.81 m (5 ft 11 in)
- Position: Forward

Team information
- Current team: Petro de Luanda

Senior career*
Years	Team	Apps	(Gls)
2008–2014	Tombense	0	(0)
2008–2009	→ Gazişehir Gaziantep (loan)	4	(0)
2009	→ Guarani-MG (loan)	0	(0)
2010	→ Tricordiano (loan)		
2011	→ Uberlândia (loan)		
2011	→ Oeste (loan)	8	(1)
2012	→ Johor DT (loan)		
2012	→ Boa (loan)	5	(0)
2013	→ Madureira (loan)	16	(4)
2014	CRB	3	(0)
2014–2015	Villa Nova	4	(1)
2015–2016	Caldense	0	(0)
2015	→ Fortaleza (loan)	11	(0)
2016–2019/2020-	Petro de Luanda	296	(170)
2019–2020	Olympiakos Nicosia	12	(0)
- * Club domestic league appearances and goals as of 5 May 2026 (UTC)

Tiago Lima Leal (born 26 March 1986), commonly known as Tiago Azulão, is a Brazilian-Angolan professional footballer who plays as a forward for Angolan club Petro Luanda. He earned his nickname, "Azulão", after wearing all blue clothes to play football when he was ten.

== Career ==
In 2016, Tiago Azulão signed in with Petro de Luanda for two seasons at the end of which one more season was renewed. In 2017, he received an invitation to play for the Angola national team, but he was never called up.

== Career statistics ==
As of 15 December 2024

Appearances and goals by club, season and competition
Club	Season	League			State League		Cup		Continental		Other		Total	
Club	Season	Division	Apps	Goals	Apps	Goals	Apps	Goals	Apps	Goals	Apps	Goals	Apps	Goals
Tombense	2012	–			15 (Note: Appearances in the Campeonato Mineiro II)	7	0	0	–		0	0	15	7
Tombense	2013	–			10 (Note: Appearances in the Campeonato Mineiro)	1	0	0	–		0	0	10	1
Tombense	2014	Série D	0	0	11	1	1 (Note: Appearances in the Copa do Brasil)	0	–		0	0	12	1
Tombense	Total		0	0	36	9	1	0	0	0	0	0	37	9
Gazişehir Gaziantep (loan)	2008–09	TFF First League	4	0	–		0	0	–		0	0	4	0
Guarani-MG (loan)	2009	–			2	0	0	0	–		0	0	2	0
Oeste (loan)	2011	Série D	8	1	0	0	0	0	–		0	0	8	1
Boa (loan)	2012	Série B	5	0	0	0	0	0	–		1 (Note: Appearances in the Taça Minas Gerais)	0	6	0
Madureira (loan)	2013	Série C	16	4	0	0	0	0	–		0	0	16	4
Clube de Regatas	2013	Série C	3	0	3 (Note: Appearances in the Campeonato Alagoano)	0	0	0	–		0	0	6	0
Villa Nova	2014	Série D	4	1	0	0	0	0	–		0	0	4	1
Caldense	2015	Série D	0	0	15	3	0	0	–		0	0	15	3
Caldense	2016	Série D	0	0	11	2	2	0	–		0	0	13	2
Caldense	Total		0	0	26	5	2	0	0	0	0	0	28	5
Fortaleza (loan)	2015	Série C	11	0	0	0	0	0	–		0	0	11	0
Petro de Luanda	2016	Girabola	15	9	–		2 (Note: Appearances in the Taça de Angola)	1	–		0	0	17	10
Petro de Luanda	2017	Girabola	23	17	–		5	3	–		0	0	28	20
Petro de Luanda	2018	Girabola	26	20	–		0	0	4 (Note: Appearances in the CAF Confederation Cup)	1	0	0	30	21
Petro de Luanda	2018–19	Girabola	26	13	–		3	2	12	5	0	0	41	20
Petro de Luanda	Total		90	59	0	0	10	6	16	6	0	0	116	71
Olympiakos Nicosia	2019–20	CFD	12	0	–		1	0	–		0	0	13	0
Petro de Luanda	2020–21	Girabola	27	16	–		5	1	10	2	0	0	42	19
Petro de Luanda	2021–22	Girabola	25	21	–		3	4	14	7	1	0	43	32
Petro de Luanda	2022–23	Girabola	27	20	–		2	2	10	5	1	0	40	27
Petro de Luanda	2023–24	Girabola	19	11	–		3	0	10	1	3	1	35	13
Petro de Luanda	Total		98	68	0	0	13	7	44	15	5	1	160	91
Career total			232	130	67	14	24	13	59	20	6	1	401	184

== Honours ==
Petro Atlético

- Angola Cup: 2017

Individual

- Girabola top scorer: 2017, 2018, 2021, 2022, 2023
- CAF Champions League top scorer: 2021–22
