= Toni (footballer, born 1992) =

Brazilian footballer

Personal information
- Full name: Antonio Rosa Ribeiro
- Date of birth: 8 October 1992 (age 34)
- Place of birth: Vitória, Brazil
- Height: 1.78 m (5 ft 10 in)
- Position: Midfielder

Team information
- Current team: Vitória (ES)

Youth career
- Atlético Mineiro

Senior career*
Years	Team	Apps	(Gls)
2012	Democrata-SL	0	(0)
2012	Morrinhos	0	(0)
2013	Operário-PR	0	(0)
2013	Marcílio Dias	8	(2)
2013	Metropolitano		
2014	Tombense	0	(0)
2014	Cascavel	0	(0)
2015–2016	Brusque	8	(4)
2016	→ Paraná (loan)	0	(0)
2016	→ Marcílio Dias (loan)	0	(0)
2017–2021	Petro Luanda	115	(38)
2021–2022	Brusque	9	(2)
2022	Hatta	13	(8)
2023–	Vitória (ES)	14	(9)
- * Club domestic league appearances and goals as of 18:56, 29 September 2023 (UTC)

Antonio Rosa Ribeiro (born 8 October 1992), commonly known as Toni or Tony, is a Brazilian footballer who currently plays as a midfielder for Vitória (ES).

== Career statistics ==
=== Club ===
As of 29 September 2023.

Club	Season	League			Cup		Continental		Other		Total	
Club	Season	Division	Apps	Goals	Apps	Goals	Apps	Goals	Apps	Goals	Apps	Goals
Democrata-SL	2012	–			0	0	–		3 (Note: Appearances in the Campeonato Mineiro II)	0	3	0
Operário-PR	2013	–			0	0	–		1 (Note: Appearances in the Campeonato Paranaense)	0	1	0
Marcílio Dias	2013	Série D	8	2	0	0	–		0	0	8	2
Tombense	2014	Série D	0	0	2 (Note: Appearances in the Copa do Brasil)	0	–		9 (Note: Appearances in the Campeonato Mineiro)	3	11	3
Cascavel	2015	–			0	0	–		11	3	11	3
Brusque	2015	–			0	0	–		0	0	0	0
Brusque	2016	Série D	8	4	0	0	–		0	0	8	4
Paraná (loan)	2016	Série B	0	0	0	0	–		9	0	9	0
Marcílio Dias (loan)	2016	–			0	0	–		4 (Note: Appearances in the Campeonato Catarinense II)	5	4	5
Petro Luanda	2017	Girabola	24	8	5 (Note: Appearances in the Taça de Angola)	0	–		–		29	8
Petro Luanda	2018	Girabola	22	5	–		4 (Note: Appearances in the CAF Confederation Cup)	3	–		26	8
Petro Luanda	2018–19	Girabola	28	9	3	1	12	3	–		43	13
Petro Luanda	2019–20	Girabola	23	14	1	1	5	3	–		29	18
Petro Luanda	2020–21	Girabola	18	2	3	0	7	1	–		28	3
Petro Luanda	Total		115	38	11	2	28	10	0	0	149	50
Brusque	2021	Série B	9	2	0	0	–		0	0	9	2
Hatta	2021–22	UD1	13	8	0	0	–		0	0	13	8
Vitória	2023	Série D	14	9	1	0	–		11 (Note: Appearances in the Campeonato Capixaba)	6	26	15
Career total			167	63	15	2	28	10	48	17	232	92
