= Diógenes João =

Angolan footballer (born 1997)

Personal information
- Full name: Diógenes Capemba João
- Date of birth: 1 January 1997 (age 29)
- Place of birth: Miconge, Cabinda, Angola
- Position: Midfielder

Team information
- Current team: Atlético Petróleos de Luanda

Senior career*
Years	Team	Apps	(Gls)
2012–	Atlético Petróleos de Luanda	141	(4)

International career^{‡}
2012–	Angola	10	(0)
- * Club domestic league appearances and goals as of 21 February 2013 ‡ National team caps and goals as of 10 June 2019

Diógenes Capemba João (born 1 January 1997) is an Angolan professional footballer who plays as a midfielder for Atlético Petróleos de Luanda.
