= 2018–19 Girabola =

Season of top-tier football in Angola

Girabola
- Season: 2018–19
- Matches played: 236
- Goals scored: 491 (2.08 per match)
- Top goalscorer: Mabululu (14)
- Biggest home win: D'Agosto 5–0 Sta Rita (01 Dec 2018)
- Biggest away win: Sporting 0–3 Progresso (03 Nov 2018); ASA 0–3 1º Agosto (22 Nov 2018)
- Highest scoring: C.Cubango 3–4 Sta Rita (30 Dec 2018)
- Longest winning run: Desportivo (7) (18 Dec–26 Jan)
- Longest unbeaten run: 1º Agosto (30) (30 Oct–19 May)
- Longest winless run: Sporting (15) (29 Dec–3 Apr)
- Longest losing run: (4)Six teams
- All statistics correct as of 19 May 2019.

The 2018–19 Girabola was the 41st season of top-tier football in Angola. The season was held from 27 October 2018 to 19 May 2019.

The league was contested by 16 teams and the bottom three teams were relegated to the 2020 Provincial stages.

In the 13th round match between Saurimo FC and ASA, the home team goal-keeper Anselmo felt confident enough to leave his goal unguarded and shoot a free kick that had been awarded for his team, 25 minutes into the game. His confidence paid off as he scored the only goal in the home team's 1-0 win, something unheard of in Angolan football.

== Teams ==
A total of 16 teams contested the league, including 13 sides from the 2018 season and three promoted from the 2018 Segundona - ASA, Saurimo FC (ex-Bikuku FC) and Santa Rita de Cássia.

On the other hand, Domant FC, J.G.M. and Primeiro de Maio were the last three teams of the 2018 season and played in their respective provincial leagues seeking qualification for the 2019–20 2nd division qualifiers. Clube Desportivo Primeiro de Agosto were the defending champions from the 2018 season.

== Changes from 2018 season ==
Relegated: Domant FC, J.G.M., Primeiro de Maio
Promoted: ASA, Saurimo FC (ex-Bikuku FC), Santa Rita de Cássia

== FAF penalties ==
- As a result of a match-fixing investigation launched by the Angolan Football Federation (FAF) on the 17th round match between Desportivo da Huila and 1º de Agosto, each team forfeited 3 points and a $5,000 fine.
- Kabuscorp do Palanca forfeited 9 points, for failing to address payment claims by a total 6 former employees (including players, technical and medical staff), following a 15-day deadline stipulated by FAF.
- Bravos do Maquis forfeited 3 points, for failing to address payment claims by former player Silvino Assete, following a 15-day deadline stipulated by FAF.

== FIFA penalty ==
The Angolan Football Federation was instructed by FIFA to relegate Kabuscorp for failing to meet payment claims by former player Rivaldo. Even though the debt has reportedly been paid in full, Kabuscorp failed to pay within the established deadline. The club faced a second relegation penalty regarding their dispute with TP Mazembe

== Stadiums and locations ==
Locations of the 2019 Girabola teams

Team	Home city	Stadium	Capacity	2018 season
Académica do Lobito	Lobito	Estádio do Buraco (Note: In major/risky matches such as those involving 1º de Agosto, Petro de Luanda and Kabuscorp, they play at the Estádio de Ombaka as their home court.)	15,000	5th in Girabola
ASA	Luanda	Estádio dos Coqueiros	12,000	1st in Segundona
Bravos do Maquis	Luena	Estádio Mundunduleno	4,300	8th in Girabola
Cuando Cubango FC	Kuito	Estádio dos Eucaliptos (Note: Cuando Cubango FC played their home games in the city of Kuito as their home court in Menongue is undergoing some repairs after being ruled unfit by a FAF inspection.)	3,300	11th in Girabola
Desportivo da Huíla	Lubango	Estádio do Ferroviário da Huíla	25,000	6th in Girabola
Interclube	Luanda	Estádio 22 de Junho	7,000	3rd in Girabola
Kabuscorp	Luanda	Estádio dos Coqueiros	12,000	9th in Girabola
Petro de Luanda	Luanda	Estádio 11 de Novembro	50,000	2nd in Girabola
Primeiro de Agosto	Luanda	Estádio 11 de Novembro	50,000	Girabola Champions
Progresso do Sambizanga	Luanda	Estádio dos Coqueiros	12,000	13th in Girabola
Recreativo da Caála	Caála	Estádio Mártires da Canhala	8,000	12th in Girabola
Recreativo do Libolo	Calulo	Estádio Municipal	5,000	4th in Girabola
Sagrada Esperança	Dundo	Estádio Sagrada Esperança	8,000	7th in Girabola
Santa Rita de Cássia	Uíge	Estádio 4 de Janeiro	12,000	3rd in Segundona
Saurimo FC (Note: Formerly Bikuku FC)	Saurimo	Estádio das Mangueiras	7,500	2nd in Segundona
Sporting de Cabinda	Cabinda	Estádio do Tafe	9,000	10th in Girabola

== League table ==
Pos	Team	Pld	W	D	L	GF	GA	GD	Pts	Qualification or relegation (Note: No teams enter the Confederation Cup. Desportivo da Huíla are Angola Cup runners-up (Primeiro de Agosto are cup winners) but declined to participate, while Kabuscorp were relegated and thus not eligible.)
1	Primeiro de Agosto (Note: Primeiro de Agosto and Desportivo da Huíla forfeited 3 points on suspicion of match-fixing on the 17th round match.) (C)	30	20	10	0	51	9	+42	67	Qualification for Champions League
2	Petro de Luanda	30	19	7	4	40	15	+25	64	Qualification for Champions League
3	Desportivo da Huíla	30	15	8	7	36	25	+11	50	
4	Kabuscorp (Note: Kabuscorp had forfeited 9 points as a result of payment default. On appeal, after the plaintiffs dropped their claims, all points were restored. Regarding their dispute with former player Rivaldo, the club was ordered to be relegated by FIFA for failing to pay the outstanding debt within the established deadline.) (R)	30	13	10	7	35	26	+9	49	Relegation to Provincial stages
5	Interclube	30	11	11	8	27	22	+5	44	
6	Sagrada Esperança	30	10	11	9	31	26	+5	41	
7	Progresso do Sambizanga	30	9	13	8	33	29	+4	40	
8	Recreativo do Libolo	30	10	9	11	31	30	+1	39	
9	Recreativo da Caála	30	8	13	9	30	34	−4	37	
10	Bravos do Maquis (Note: Bravos do Maquis forfeited 3 points as a result of payment default.)	30	7	15	8	28	28	0	33	
11	Santa Rita de Cássia	30	8	8	14	32	41	−9	32	
12	Académica do Lobito	30	7	10	13	23	29	−6	31	
13	Sporting de Cabinda	30	6	12	12	30	43	−13	30	
14	Cuando Cubango FC (Note: Cuando Cubango FC were originally relegated, but remained in Girabola due to Kabuscorp's relegation.)	30	6	8	16	30	51	−21	26 (Note: Head-to-head results: C.Cubango 2, ASA 1; ASA 2 C.Cubango 2.)	
15	ASA (R)	30	5	11	14	26	48	−22	26	Relegation to Provincial stages
16	Saurimo FC (R)	30	5	6	19	20	47	−27	21	Relegation to Provincial stages

Source: Girabola.com
Rules for classification: 1) Points; 2) Head-to-head points; 3) Goal difference; 4) Head-to-head goal difference; 5) Goals scored; 6) Fair-play points; 7) Play-off.
(C) Champions; (R) Relegated

== Results ==
Home \ Away	ACA	ASA	BMQ	CCU	DHL	INT	KAB	PET	PRI	PRO	RCA	RLB	SAG	SAU	SCC	SRC
Académica do Lobito	—	2–1	0–0	4–0	2–0	1–0	0–1	1–2	0–1	0–2	0–0	1–1	0–0	2–0	3–0	1–1
ASA	0–0	—	2–1	2–2	1–3	0–1	1–2	0–0	0–3	0–0	2–2	1–1	1–1	1–0	3–1	2–1
Bravos do Maquis	1–1	1–1	—	2–2	1–2	1–1	0–0	1–1	0–0	0–0	1–2	3–0	1–0	1–1	2–0	3–2
Cuando Cubango FC	1–2	2–1	2–1	—	0–0	0–2	1–1	0–1	0–3	1–1	0–2	2–0	0–0	3–1	1–1	3–4
Desportivo da Huíla	2–0	1–1	1–1	2–0	—	1–0	2–1	2–0	3–3	0–0	2–0	1–0	2–0	2–1	0–1	0–0
Interclube	1–0	2–0	1–0	1–2	1–1	—	1–0	0–1	0–0	0–0	1–1	1–0	1–0	1–0	0–0	2–2
Kabuscorp	3–1	0–1	0–0	3–2	2–0	2–1	—	1–4	0–1	1–1	3–1	1–0	1–1	3–0	3–1	0–0
Petro de Luanda	1–0	3–0	0–2	3–1	1–0	1–0	2–0	—	0–0	3–0	2–0	2–1	2–0	1–0	1–0	3–1
Primeiro de Agosto	1–0	4–0	3–0	1–0	2–0	0–0	2–0	1–0	—	0–0	1–0	3–0	3–3	2–0	1–0	5–0
Progresso do Sambizanga	3–0	2–1	1–1	3–1	0–1	1–2	1–2	1–1	0–3	—	3–1	1–0	0–1	1–1	1–1	1–0
Recreativo da Caála	1–0	0–0	2–0	1–1	2–2	0–0	0–0	2–1	0–2	1–1	—	2–2	2–0	3–0 (Note: Caála was awarded a 3–0 win)	1–1	1–0
Recreativo do Libolo	3–0 (Note: Libolo was awarded a 3–0 win)	2–1	1–0	3–1	1–2	1–1	0–0	0–0	0–0	2–1	2–0	—	1–1	2–1	3–0	2–0
Sagrada Esperança	0–0	3–0 (Note: Sagrada was awarded a 3–0 win)	1–1	2–0	2–1	3–1	0–1	0–0	1–1	1–1	1–0	1–2	—	3–0	0–1	1–0
Saurimo FC	1–1	1–0	0–1	0–1	2–1	1–0	1–3	0–2	0–0	1–3	1–1	2–1	1–3	—	0–1	3–2
Sporting de Cabinda	1–1	6–2	0–0	3–1	0–1	1–3	0–0	1–1	2–4	0–3	2–2	0–0	1–0	1–1	—	2–2
Santa Rita de Cássia	1–0	1–1	1–2	1–0	0–1	1–1	1–1	0–1	0–1	2–0	3–0 (Note: Santa Rita was awarded a 3–0 win)	1–0	1–2	1–0	3–2	—

Updated to match(es) played on 19 May 2019. Source: girabola.com
Legend: Blue = home team win; Yellow = draw; Red = away team win.

=== Positions by round ===
Team ╲ Round	1	2	3	4	5	6	7	8	9	10	11	12	13	14	15	16	17	18	19	20	21	22	23	24	25	26	27	28	29	30
1º de Agosto	11	2	1	1	1	1	1	1	1	1	1	1	1	1	1	1	2	2	2	1	1	1	1	1	1	1	1	1	1	1
Petro de Luanda	11	2	3	3	2	2	3	5	4	3	2	2	2	2	2	2	1	1	1	2	2	2	2	2	2	2	2	2	2	2
Desportivo da Huíla	3	12	11	9	8	8	7	4	2	2	3	3	3	3	3	3	3	3	3	3	3	3	3	3	3	3	3	3	4	3
Kabuscorp	3	4	9	11	11	6	5	3	5	4	4	4	4	4	4	4	4	4	4	4	4	4	4	4	4	4	4	4	3	4
Interclube	11	14	8	8	4	5	8	9	9	10	11	12	13	8	10	9	7	10	10	10	10	8	6	6	6	5	5	5	6	5
Sagrada Esperança	3	4	4	5	5	7	4	7	10	7	7	7	8	9	7	6	6	6	5	5	6	5	5	5	5	6	6	7	5	6
Progresso	3	1	1	2	3	3	6	6	8	8	6	5	5	5	5	5	5	5	6	6	7	7	10	9	7	8	7	6	7	7
Recreativo do Libolo	11	14	6	6	7	11	13	14	14	15	12	13	9	11	9	11	10	9	8	7	5	6	7	8	10	10	9	8	8	8
Recreativo da Caála	15	9	13	14	14	9	10	10	6	5	8	8	7	10	11	7	8	8	9	8	8	9	8	10	8	9	10	9	9	9
Bravos do Maquis	3	10	4	4	6	4	2	2	3	6	5	6	6	6	6	8	9	7	7	9	9	10	9	7	9	7	8	10	10	10
Santa Rita	1	7	12	15	15	14	15	15	15	12	13	10	11	7	8	10	12	12	13	11	11	11	12	11	11	11	11	11	12	11
Sporting de Cabinda	15	16	16	16	16	10	12	8	7	9	10	11	12	14	14	13	14	13	14	13	12	12	11	12	13	13	13	13	11	12
Académica do Lobito	1	7	6	7	9	13	9	13	11	11	9	9	10	13	12	12	13	11	11	12	13	13	13	13	12	12	12	12	13	13
Cuando Cubango FC	3	12	15	12	12	15	11	12	12	14	15	15	14	15	15	15	15	15	15	15	14	14	15	15	15	15	14	15	15	14
ASA	3	10	14	10	10	12	14	11	13	13	14	14	15	12	13	14	11	14	12	14	15	15	14	14	14	14	15	14	14	15
Saurimo FC	3	4	9	13	13	16	16	16	16	16	16	16	16	16	16	16	16	16	16	16	16	16	16	16	16	16	16	16	16	16

Leader (2019–20 CAF Champions League)
Runner-up (2019–20 CAF Champions League)
3rd place (2019–20 CAF Confederation Cup)
Relegation to 2020 Provincial stages

Source: Girabola

=== Clubs season progress ===
Team ╲ Round	1	2	3	4	5	6	7	8	9	10	11	12	13	14	15	16	17	18	19	20	21	22	23	24	25	26	27	28	29	30
Académica Lobito (Note: Académica Lobito was awarded a 0-3 loss by default in its round 13 match against Recreativo do Libolo.)	W	L	D	D	L	L	W	L	W	L	W	L	L	L	D	D	D	D	L	D	L	L	W	D	D	W	L	D	L	W
ASA (Note: ASA was awarded a 0-3 loss by default in its round 16 match against Sagrada Esperança.)	D	D	L	W	L	D	L	W	L	D	L	D	L	W	D	L	W	L	L	L	L	D	D	D	L	D	L	W	L	D
Bravos do Maquis	D	D	W	D	D	W	D	W	D	L	D	D	D	D	D	L	W	D	D	L	D	W	W	W	L	L	L	L	D	L
Cuando Cubango FC	D	L	L	W	D	L	W	D	L	L	L	D	D	L	L	L	L	W	W	L	D	D	L	L	D	L	W	L	L	W
Desportivo da Huíla	D	L	W	D	D	D	W	W	W	W	W	W	W	L	L	D	L	W	W	W	D	L	D	W	W	L	W	L	D	W
Interclube	D	L	W	D	W	D	L	D	D	L	L	D	D	W	D	D	W	L	L	W	D	W	W	W	L	W	D	W	L	W
Kabuscorp	D	W	L	L	D	W	W	W	L	W	D	W	W	D	L	W	L	W	W	D	W	D	D	L	W	W	D	D	D	L
Petro de Luanda	D	W	D	W	W	L	W	W	D	W	W	W	L	W	D	W	W	L	W	D	D	W	W	W	L	W	W	W	W	D
1º de Agosto	D	W	W	W	W	D	D	D	W	W	D	D	W	W	W	D	D	W	W	W	W	W	D	W	W	W	D	W	W	W
Progresso	D	W	W	D	D	D	L	D	L	D	W	W	D	W	L	W	D	D	L	D	L	D	L	D	W	L	W	W	L	D
Recreativo da Caála	W	L	L	D	L	D	W	W	W	L	L	D	D	L	D	W	D	D	L	W	D	D	W	L	L	D	D	W	D	D
Recreativo do Libolo (Note: Recreativo da Caála was awarded a 0-3 loss by default in its inaugural match against Santa Rita de Cássia.)	D	L	W	D	D	L	D	L	D	L	W	L	L	W	W	W	D	W	W	W	L	D	L	L	L	D	W	D	W	L
Sagrada Esperança	D	W	D	D	D	W	L	L	W	D	D	L	L	W	D	W	W	W	L	D	L	W	L	W	D	L	D	D	W	L
Saurimo FC (Note: Saurimo FC was awarded a 0-3 loss by default in its round 6 match against Recreativo da Caála.)	D	W	L	L	L	L	D	L	D	L	W	L	W	L	D	L	L	L	D	D	L	L	L	L	W	L	L	L	W	L
Sporting de Cabinda	L	L	D	L	W	W	W	D	L	D	D	L	D	L	D	D	D	D	L	D	D	D	W	L	L	L	L	W	W	L
Santa Rita	L	W	L	L	D	D	L	L	W	W	L	W	L	W	D	L	L	L	L	D	D	D	D	W	D	W	L	L	L	W

== Statistics ==
=== Top scorers ===
As of 19 May 2019

Rank	Scorer	Club	Apps	Goals
1	(Angola) Mabululu	1º de Agosto	22(4)	14
2	(Brazil) Azulão	Petro de Luanda	25(1)	13
3	(Angola) Chico	Bravos do Maquis	27(2)	13
4	(Cameroon) Lionel	Desportivo da Huíla	26(2)	12
5	(Democratic Republic of the Congo) Jiresse	Sagrada Esperança	21(3)	10
6	(Brazil) Tony	Petro de Luanda	21(7)	9
7	(Rwanda) Daddy	Kabuscorp	29	9

=== Hat-tricks ===
Player	For	Against	S	R	Date
(Brazil) Tony	Petro de Luanda	Progresso Sambizanga	3-0 (H)	15	29 January 2019
(Republic of the Congo) Kaya	Rec do Libolo	Cuando Cubango FC	3-1 (H)	15	2 February 2019
(Angola) Chico	Bravos do Maquis	S^{ta} Rita de Cássia	3-2 (H)	18	9 March 2019
(Brazil) Azulão	Petro de Luanda	Kabuscorp	1-4 (A)	24	13 April 2019

2018–19 Girabola winner
Clube Desportivo Primeiro de Agosto
13th title

Squad:
Neblú, Nsesani, Tony Cabaça (GK)
Bobo, Bonifácio, Dani, Isaac, Mingo Bile, Natael, Paizo, Yisa (DF)
Aquino, Ary Papel, Buá, Cirilo, Kila, Macaia, Mário, Mongo, Nelson, Show (MF)
Dago, Mabululu, Melono, Vanilson, Zito (FW)
Dragan Jović (Head Coach)

Top Scorer
(Angola) Mabululu
