= 2017 Atlético Petróleos de Luanda season =

Atlético Petróleos de Luanda
2017 season
- President: Tomás Faria
- Manager: Beto Bianchi (Jan 2016–)
- Stadium: Estádio 11 de Novembro
- Girabola: Runner-Up
- Angola Cup: Champion
- Top goalscorer: League: Azulão (15); All: Azulão (18)
- Biggest win: Petro 5–1 Sagrada (7 May 2017)
- Biggest defeat: Interclube 2–0 Petro (30 Aug 2017); Desportivo 2–0 Petro (26 Oct 2017)
Home colours	Away colours
- All statistics correct as of 11 November 2017.

The 2017 season of Atlético Petróleos de Luanda is the club's 36th season in the Girabola, the Angolan Premier football League and 36th consecutive season in the top flight of Angolan football. In 2017, the club participated in the Girabola and the Angola Cup.

== Squad information ==
=== Players ===
No.	Nat	Nick	Name	Pos	Date of birth (age)
Goalkeepers
1	(Angola)	Lamá	Luís Maimona João	–	1 February 1981 (aged 36)
12	(Angola)	Mig	Zacarias dos Milagres Sambambi	–	11 November 1993 (aged 24)
22	(Angola)	Gerson	Gerson Bruno da Costa Barros	–	1 April 1987 (aged 30)
Defenders
2	(Angola)	Mira	Daniel João Zongo Macuenho	RB	12 February 1991 (aged 26)
3	(Angola)	Ary	Ariclene Assunção Oliveira	LB	6 August 1992 (aged 25)
4	(Angola)	Maludi	Maludi Francisco Caxala	CB	12 June 1993 (aged 24)
13	(Angola)	Miguel	Miguel Geraldo Quiame	LB	17 September 1991 (aged 26)
15	(Angola)	Wilson	Wilson Pinto Gaspar	CB	29 September 1990 (aged 27)
21	(Angola)	Mabiná	José Pedro Alberto	RB	2 August 1983 (aged 34)
25	(Angola)	Abdul	António Nzayinawo	LB	7 March 1994 (aged 23)
Midfielders
5	(Angola)	Élio	Élio Wilson Costa Martins	CM	20 December 1987 (aged 30)
10	(Angola)	Manguxi	Augusto António Domingos Quibeto	RW	27 November 1991 (aged 26)
14	(Angola)	Mateus	Mateus Gaspar Domingos	RW	20 August 1993 (aged 24)
16	(Angola)	Bebo	Manuel João Miguel Costa	MF	3 June 1999 (aged 18)
16	(Angola)	Carlinhos	Carlos Sténio do Carmo	–	19 March 1995 (aged 22)
17	(Angola)	Diógenes	Diógenes Capemba João	CM	1 January 1997 (aged 20)
18	(Angola)	Herenilson	Herenilson Caifalo do Carmo	CM	23 May 1996 (aged 21)
20	(Brazil)	Diney	Valdisney Costa dos Santos	MF	2 March 1991 (aged 26)
23	(Angola)	Balacai	Evaristo Maurício Pascoal	LW	13 August 1995 (aged 22)
24	(Angola)	Mavambu	Mavambu João Afonso Baptista	MF	27 July 1996 (aged 21)
30	(Angola)	Benvindo	Benvindo Afonso Nsianfumu	MF	6 June 1996 (aged 21)
Forwards
11	(Angola)	Job	Ricardo Job Estévão	RW	27 September 1987 (aged 30)
19	(Brazil)	Tony	António Rosa Ribeiro	MF	6 October 1992 (aged 25)
26	(Brazil)	Tiago Azulão	Tiago Lima Leal	MF	26 March 1988 (aged 29)
28	(Nigeria)	Dennis	Dennis Sesugh	MF	11 August 1995 (aged 22)

=== Pre-season transfers ===
No.	Nat	Nick	Name	Pos	Date of birth (age)	
Transfers out To
30	(Angola)	Benvindo	Nsianfumu Benvindo Afonso	GK	6 June 1996 (aged 21)	(Angola) J.G.M.
8	(Angola)	Chara	Fernando Agostinho da Costa	MF	10 October 1981 (aged 36)	(Angola) Recreativo Libolo
7	(Cameroon)	Etah	Michael Ntui Etah	DF	15 May 1984 (aged 33)	(Angola) Bravos do Maquis
9	(Brazil)	Fabrício	Fabrício Santos Simões	FW	26 December 1984 (aged 33)	(Angola) Recreativo Libolo
6	(Angola)	Francis	Francisco Marta Agostinho da Rosa	MF	15 August 1993 (aged 24)	(Angola) Sagrada Esperança
19	(Democratic Republic of the Congo)	Jiresse	Mawiya Tutona Jiresse	FW	7 May 1992 (aged 25)	(Angola) Académica Lobito
24	(Angola)	Mavambu	Mavambu João Afonso Baptista	MF	27 July 1996 (aged 21)	(Angola) Desportivo Huíla
Transfers in From
30	(Angola)	Augusto	Augusto Monteiro Mualucano	GK	1 January 1998 (aged 19)	(Angola) Junior team
13	(Angola)	Eliseu	Eliseu Cabanga	DF	13 February 1997 (aged 20)	(Angola) Junior team
17	(Angola)	Nandinho	Fernando Bumba Mendes	MF	29 December 1994 (aged 23)	(Angola) Desportivo Huíla
24	(Angola)	Pedro	Tomé Osvaldo Pedro	MF	22 July 1998 (aged 19)	(Angola) Junior team
20	(Brazil)	Rubinho	Rubenval Rodrigo da Rocha	MF	28 April 1988 (aged 29)	(Brazil) Cuiabá Esporte Clube
19	(Brazil)	Tony	António Rosa Ribeiro	FW	6 October 1992 (aged 25)	(Brazil) Brusque Futebol Clube

=== Mid-season transfers ===
No.	Nat	Nick	Name	Pos	Date of birth (age)	
Transfers out To
12	(Angola)	Mig	Zacarias dos Milagres Sambambi	–	11 November 1993 (aged 24)	(Angola) Académica Lobito
Transfers in From
28	(Nigeria)	Dennis	Dennis Sesugh	FW	11 August 1995 (aged 22)	(Angola) Santa Rita de Cássia
20	(Brazil)	Diney	Valdisney Costa dos Santos	MF	2 March 1991 (aged 26)	(Brazil) E.C. Água Santa

=== Staff ===
Nat	Name	Position(s)	Date of birth (age)
Technical staff
(Brazil)	Beto Bianchi	Head coach	6 November 1966 (aged 51)
(Angola)	Flávio Amado	Assistant coach	30 December 1979 (aged 38)
(Angola)	Jaime Silva Nejó	Assistant coach	25 July 1965 (aged 52)
(Brazil)	Adriano Soares	Goalkeeper coach	–
Medical
(Angola)	Nelson Bolivar	Physician	–
(Brazil)	Maurício Marques	Physio	–
(Angola)	Ramiro José	Masseur	–
Management
(Angola)	Tomás Faria	Chairman	–
(Angola)	Chico Afonso	Vice-Chairman	–
(Angola)	Sidónio Malamba	Head of Foot Dept	–

== Overview ==
Competition	First match	Last match	Final position	Record							
Competition	First match	Last match	Final position	Pld	W	D	L	GF	GA	GD	Win %
Girabola	11 February 2017	5 November 2017	Runner-up	30	20	2	8	46	20	+26	66.67
Angola Cup	23 September 2017	11 November 2017	Winner	7	5	1	1	7	4	+3	71.43
Total				37	25	3	9	53	24	+29	67.57

Last updated: 11 November 2017

== Angolan League ==
=== League table ===
Pos	Team	Pld	W	D	L	GF	GA	GD	Pts	Qualification or relegation
1	Primeiro de Agosto (C)	30	19	8	3	44	14	+30	65	Qualification for Champions League
2	Petro de Luanda	30	20	2	8	46	20	+26	62	
3	Sagrada Esperança	30	15	8	7	34	23	+11	53	
4	Kabuscorp	30	13	11	6	40	29	+11	50	
5	Recreativo do Libolo	30	13	9	8	41	23	+18	48	

Updated to match(es) played on 3 November 2017. Source: Girabola.com
Rules for classification: 1) Points; 2) Head-to-head points; 3) Head-to-head goal difference; 4) Goal difference; 5) Goals scored; 6) Fair-play points; 7) Play-off.
(C) Champions

=== Results ===
==== Results summary ====
Overall								Home						Away					
Pld	W	D	L	GF	GA	GD	Pts	W	D	L	GF	GA	GD	W	D	L	GF	GA	GD
30	20	2	8	46	20	+26	62	13	2	0	35	8	+27	7	0	8	11	12	−1

Last updated: 5 November 2017.

==== Results by round ====
Round	1	2	3	4	5	6	7	8	9	10	11	12	13	14	15	16	17	18	19	20	21	22	23	24	25	26	27	28	29	30
Ground	H	A	H	A	H	A	H	A	H	A	H	A	H	A	H	A	H	A	H	A	H	A	H	A	H	A	H	A	H	A
Result	W	L	W	W	W	L	W	W	D	W	W	L	W	W	W	W	W	L	W	W	D	W	W	L	W	L	W	L	W	L
Position	4	8	4	4	4	4	3	3	3	3	2	4	3	2	1	1	1	2	1	1	2	2	1	2	1	2	2	2	2	2

Updated to match(es) played on 5 November 2017. Source: www.girabola.com
A = Away; H = Home; W = Win; D = Draw; L = Loss

=== Match details ===
Sat, 11 Feb 2017 01	Petro Atlético	2–1	Progresso	11 de Novembro, Luanda
16:00 WAT (UTC+01:00)	Nzau 38' (o.g.); Azulão 68'	Report	72' Patrick	Attendance: 3,000; Referee: Paulo Sérgio; Tomás Lima, Segunda Tchisseque
Note: Gerson / Ary, Élio, Mira, Wilson / Herenilson, Carlinhos (substituted off) 87', Manguxi, Diógenes / Azulão, Job (c) (substituted off) 60' — Balacai (substituted on) 60', Nandinho (substituted on) 87'

Sun, 19 Feb 2017 02	Rec do Libolo	1–0	Petro Atlético	Estádio Municipal, Calulo
15:00 WAT (UTC+1)	Paizinho 82'	Report		Referee: António Dungula; Jerson Emiliano, Wilson Ntyamba
Note: Gerson / Ary, Élio, Herenilson, Mira / Carlinhos, Diógenes (substituted off) 71', Manguxi, Rubinho (substituted off) 51' / Azulão, Job (c) (substituted off) 83' — Mateus (substituted on) 51', Nandinho (substituted on) 71', Abdul (substituted on) 83'

Sat, 25 Feb 2017 03	Petro Atlético	2–0	Interclube	11 de Novembro, Luanda
17:30 WAT (UTC+1)	Abdul 54'; Manguxi 60'	Report		Referee: José Álvaro; Estanislau Guedes, Pedro Nguelengue
Note: Gerson / Abdul, Ary, Élio, Mira / Diógenes, Job (c) (substituted off) 45', Manguxi, Mateus (substituted off) 76' / Azulão, Tony (substituted off) 89' — Carlinhos (substituted on) 45', Nandinho (substituted on) 76', Mabiná (substituted on) 89'

Sat, 4 Mar 2017 04	Progresso LS	0–1	Petro Atlético	Mangueiras, Saurimo
15:00 WAT (UTC+1)		Report	24' Azulão	Attendance: 7,000; Referee: Benjamim Andrade; Judith Mestre, Bernabé Ngulo
Note: Gerson / Abdul, Ary, Élio, Mira (substituted off) 67' / Herenilson, Job (c), Manguxi, Mateus (substituted off) 79' / Azulão, Tony (substituted off) 63' — Carlinhos (substituted on) 63', Mabiná (substituted on) 67', Nandinho (substituted on) 79'

Sun, 12 Mar 2017 05	Petro Atlético	2–0	ASA	11 de Novembro, Luanda
17:00 WAT (UTC+1)	Manguxi 50'; Azulão 66'	Report		Attendance: 5,000; Referee: Miguel Mateus; Celestino Golomboli, Celson António
Note: Gerson / Abdul, Ary, Élio, Mira / Herenilson (substituted off) 70', Job (c), Manguxi, Mateus (substituted off) 45' / Azulão, Tony (substituted off) 45' — Carlinhos (substituted on) 45', Nandinho (substituted on) 45', Wilson (substituted on) 70'

Fri, 17 Mar 2017 06	Kabuscorp	2–1	Petro Atlético	11 de Novembro, Luanda
18:00 WAT (UTC+1)	Jacques 11'; Dr Lami 82'	Report	33' Azulão	Attendance: 20,000; Referee: Paulo Talaia; Júlio Lemos, Judith Mestre
Note: Gerson / Abdul, Ary, Élio, Mira / Herenilson, Job (c) (substituted off) 62', Manguxi, Mateus (substituted off) 63' / Azulão, Carlinhos — Tony (substituted on) 62', Diógenes (substituted on) 63'

Mon, 20 Mar 2017 07	Petro Atlético	3–0	J.G.M.	11 de Novembro, Luanda
16:00 WAT (UTC+01)	Job 6'; Manguxi 77'; Azulão 87'	Report		Attendance: 1,000; Referee: Carlos Silva; Manuel Lobe, Cláudio Francisco
Note: Gerson / Ary, Élio (substituted off) 40', Mabiná, Wilson / Carlinhos (substituted off) 67', Herenilson, Job (c), Manguxi / Azulão, Nandinho (substituted off) 48' — Abdul (substituted on) 40', Mateus (substituted on) 48', Tony (substituted on) 67'

Sun, 2 Apr 2017 08	Rec da Caála	0–1	Petro Atlético	Mártires da Canhala, Caála
15:00 WAT (UTC+1)		Report	9' Wilson	Attendance: 10,000; Referee: Nuno Eduardo; Manuel Benguela, Nilton Armando
Note: Gerson / Abdul, Ary, Élio, Wilson / Carlinhos (substituted off) 73', Diógenes (substituted off) 67', Herenilson, Manguxi / Azulão (substituted off) 34', Job (c) — Tony (substituted on) 34', Nandinho (substituted on) 67', Mabiná (substituted on) 73'

Sat, 8 Apr 2017 09	Petro Atlético	0–0	1º de Agosto	11 de Novembro, Luanda
18:00 WAT (UTC+1)		Report		Attendance: 25,000; Referee: Pedro dos Santos; Jerson Santos, Wilson Ntyamba
Note: Gerson / Élio, Mabiná (substituted off) 86', Mira, Wilson / Ary, Carlinhos, Herenilson, Manguxi / Job (c) (substituted off) 90+7', Nandinho (substituted off) 45' — Mateus (substituted on) 45', Diógenes (substituted on) 86', Balacai (substituted on) 90+7'

Fri, 14 Apr 2017 10	Académica	0–1	Petro Atlético	Estádio do Buraco, Lobito
15:30 WAT (UTC+1)			48' (pen.) Job; 53' Nandinho	Referee: Rodrigues Aleixo; Nicodemos Calembela, Francisco Paulo
Note: Gerson / Ary, Élio, Mira, Wilson / Carlinhos, Herenilson, Manguxi, Mateus (substituted off) 85' / Job (c) (substituted off) 90+3', Nandinho (substituted off) 90+1' — Diógenes (substituted on) 85', Bebo (substituted on) 90+1', Mabiná (substituted on) 90+3'

Sat, 22 Apr 2017 11	Petro Atlético	1–0	Desportivo Huíla	11 de Novembro, Luanda
17:00 WAT (UTC+1)	Wilson 46'	Report		Attendance: 2,000; Referee: João Goma; José Felix, Odreia Miguel
Note: Gerson / Ary, Élio, Mira, Wilson / Carlinhos, Herenilson, Manguxi, Mateus / Job (c) (substituted off) 80', Nandinho (substituted off) 87' — Tony (substituted on) 80', Diógenes (substituted on) 87'

Sat, 29 Apr 2017 12	Bravos Maquis	1–0	Petro Atlético	Mundunduleno, Luena
15:00 WAT (UTC+1)	Pataca 78' (pen.)	Report		Attendance: 4,000; Referee: Osvaldo Felix; José Felix, Adão da Silva
Note: Gerson / Ary, Élio, Mira, Wilson / Carlinhos (substituted off) 65', Herenilson, Manguxi, Mateus / Job (c), Nandinho — Tony (substituted on) 65'

Sat, 6 May 2017 13	Petro Atlético	5–1	Sagrada	11 de Novembro, Luanda
17:00 WAT (UTC+1)	Mateus 23'; Job 28'; Tony 49', 60'; Carlinhos 57'	Report	76' Lelas	Attendance: 2,000; Referee: Hélder Martins; Jerson Emiliano, Wilson Ntyamba
Note: Gerson / Ary, Élio, Mira (substituted off) 89', Wilson / Carlinhos, Herenilson, Manguxi, Mateus (substituted off) 71' / Job (c), Tony (substituted off) 78' — Bebo (substituted on) 71', Diógenes (substituted on) 78', Mabiná (substituted on) 89'

Thu, 11 May 2017 14	Santa Rita	0–1	Petro Atlético	4 de Janeiro, Uíge
16:00 WAT (UTC+1)		Report	76' (pen.) Azulão	Attendance: 7,000; Referee: Bernardo Nangolo; Elias Calei, Jeremias Cafusso
Note: Gerson / Ary, Élio, Mira, Wilson / Carlinhos, Herenilson, Manguxi, Mateus (substituted off) 42' / Job (c) (substituted off) 74', Tony (substituted off) 60' — Azulão (substituted on) 42', Nandinho (substituted on) 60', Diógenes (substituted on) 74'

Sat, 20 May 2017 15	Petro Atlético	4–1	1º de Maio	11 de Novembro, Luanda
18:00 WAT (UTC+1)	Oliveira 43' (o.g.); Carlinhos 52'; Azulão 84' (pen.), 90+4'		70' Kaporal	Referee: José Maxia; Cláudio Vunge, Flávio Dias
Note: Gerson / Ary, Élio, Mira (substituted off) 69', Wilson / Carlinhos (substituted off) 76', Herenilson, Manguxi, Nandinho (substituted off) 35' / Job (c), Azulão — Mateus (substituted on) 35', Mabiná (substituted on) 69', Tony (substituted on) 76'

Fri, 16 Jun 2017 16	Progresso	0–2	Petro Atlético	Coqueiros, Luanda
17:00 WAT (UTC+1)		Report	47' Tony; 52' Azulão	Attendance: 4,000; Referee: Feliciano Lucas; Horácio Tchissingui, Alexandre Bengue
Note: Gerson / Abdul, Ary, Mira, Wilson / Carlinhos (substituted off) 46', Herenilson, Manguxi, Job (c) / Azulão (substituted off) 89', Tony (substituted off) 70' — Mateus (substituted on) 46', Nandinho (substituted on) 70', Mabiná (substituted on) 89'

Sun, 30 Jul 2017 21	Petro Atlético	1–1	Kabuscorp	11 de Novembro, Luanda
16:00 WAT (UTC+1)	Job 45'	Report	7' Jacques	Referee: António Dungula; Jerson Emiliano, Wilson Ntyamba
Note: Gerson / Ary, Élio, Mira, Wilson / Diney (substituted off) 90', Herenilson, Manguxi, Job (c) / Azulão (substituted off) 34', Tony — Mateus (substituted on) 34', Diógenes (substituted on) 90'

Wed, 02 Aug 2017 19	Petro Atlético	1–0	Progresso LS	11 de Novembro, Luanda
16:00 WAT (UTC+1)	Tony 24'			Referee: Bernardo Nangolo; Elias Calei, Jeremias Cafussa
Note: Gerson / Ary, Élio, Mira, Wilson (c) / Diney, Herenilson, Manguxi, Mateus (substituted off) 55' / Azulão (substituted off) 88', Tony (substituted off) 74' — Nandinho (substituted on) 55', Dennis (substituted on) 74', Diógenes (substituted on) 88'

Sun, 06 Aug 2017 17	Petro Atlético	1–0	Rec do Libolo	11 de Novembro, Luanda
16:00 WAT (UTC+1)	Azulão 53'	Report		Referee: Feliciano Lucas; Horácio Tchissingui, Alexandre Bengue
Note: Gerson / Ary, Élio, Mira, Wilson (c) / Diney, Diógenes (substituted off) 90+4', Herenilson, Manguxi / Azulão (substituted off) 84', Tony (substituted off) 46' — Mateus (substituted on) 46', Dennis (substituted on) 84', Mabiná (substituted on) 90+4'

Sat, 26 Aug 2017 22	J.G.M.	0–1	Petro Atlético	Kurikutelas, Huambo
15:00 WAT (UTC+1)		Report	7' Azulão	Referee: Nuno Sumbo; Manuel Benguela, Nilton Armando
Note: Gerson / Ary, Élio, Mira, Wilson (c) / Diney, Diógenes (substituted off) 78', Herenilson, Manguxi (substituted off) 66' / Azulão, Nandinho (substituted off) 65' — Mabiná (substituted on) 65', Dennis (substituted on) 66', Balacai (substituted on) 78'

Wed, 30 Aug 2017 18	Interclube	2–0	Petro Atlético	22 de Junho, Luanda
15:00 WAT (UTC+1)	Fabrício 25'; Duarte 62'	Report		Referee: João Goma; Luís Sá Miranda, Orlando Pimenta
Note: Gerson / Ary, Élio, Mira, Wilson / Diney, Herenilson, Job (c), Manguxi (substituted off) 79' / Azulão, Tony (substituted off) 65' — Carlinhos (substituted on) 65', Diógenes (substituted on) 79'

Sat, 2 Sep 2017 23	Petro Atlético	3–0	Rec da Caála	11 de Novembro, Luanda
16:00 WAT (UTC+1)	Azulão 35', 72' (pen.); Diney 83'	Report		Referee: António Caxala; Domingos Francisco, Rosário Pedro
Note: Gerson / Ary, Élio, Mira, Wilson (substituted off) 20' / Diney, Herenilson, Job (c) (substituted off) 89', Manguxi / Azulão (substituted off) 20', Tony — Maludi (substituted on) 20', Diógenes (substituted on) 88', Carlinhos (substituted on) 89'

Wed, 6 Sep 2017 20	ASA	1–2	Petro Atlético	Coqueiros, Luanda
18:00 WAT (UTC+1)	Bena 90+1'	Report	16' Azulão; 64' Carlinhos	Referee: Paulo Sérgio; Pedro Futa, Tomás Lima
Note: Gerson / Abdul, Ary, Élio, Mira (substituted off) 87' / Maludi, Diney, Job (c), Manguxi / Azulão (substituted off) 76', Tony (substituted off) 46' — Carlinhos (substituted on) 46', Nandinho (substituted on) 76', Mabiná (substituted on) 87'

Sun, 10 Sep 2017 24	1º de Agosto	1–0	Petro Atlético	11 de Novembro, Luanda
17:00 WAT (UTC+1)	Bobo 74'	Report		Referee: António Caxala; Jerson Emiliano, Júlio Lemos
Note: Gerson / Ary, Maludi, Mira, Wilson / Carlinhos (substituted off) 76', Herenilson, Job (c), Manguxi (substituted off) 57' / Azulão, Diney — Nandinho (substituted on) 57', Tony (substituted on) 76'

Sat, 16 Sep 2017 25	Petro Atlético	4–2	Académica	11 de Novembro, Luanda
18:00 WAT (UTC+1)	Carlinhos 28'; Tony 45', 67'; Job 90'	Report	33', 73' Chiló	Referee: Airton Carmelino; Ivanildo Lopes, Evanildo Martins
Note: Gerson / Abdul, Ary, Mira, Wilson / Carlinhos (substituted off) 74', Herenilson, Job (c), Tony (substituted off) 78' / Azulão (substituted off) 90+1', Diney — Manguxi (substituted on) 74', Mateus (substituted on) 78', Dennis (substituted on) 90+1'

Sun, 01 Oct 2017 26	Desportivo Huíla	2–0	Petro Atlético	Estádio do Ferrovia, Lubango
15:00 WAT (UTC+1)	Bruno 29'; Muenho 62'	Report		Referee: António Dungula; Wilson Ntyamba, Evandro Martins
Note: Gerson / Ary, Élio, Mira, Wilson / Diney, Herenilson (substituted off) 71', Job (c), Tony (substituted off) 50' / Azulão, Nandinho (substituted off) 46' — Mateus (substituted on) 46', Manguxi (substituted on) 50', Dennis (substituted on) 71'

Sun, 15 Oct 2017 27	Petro Atlético	2–0	Bravos Maquis	11 de Novembro, Luanda
17:30 WAT (UTC+1)	Manguxi 15'; Azulão 57'	Report		Referee: José Álvaro; Luís Mateus, Pedro Futa
Note: Gerson / Diógenes, Mabiná (substituted off) 68', Maludi, Wilson / Herenilson, Manguxi, Mateus (substituted off) 46', Job (c) (substituted off) 87' / Azulão, Diney — Mira (substituted on) 46', Ary (substituted on) 68', Tony (substituted on) 87'

Sat, 21 Oct 2017 28	Sagrada	1–0	Petro Atlético	Sagrada Esperança, Dundo
17:00 WAT (UTC+1)	Tresor 77' (pen.)	Report		Referee: Rodrigues Aleixo; Nicodemos Calembela, Francisco Van-Dúnem
Note: Gerson / Ary, Mabiná, Maludi, Wilson / Diógenes, Herenilson, Job (c) (substituted off) 82', Manguxi (substituted off) / Azulão, Diney (substituted off) 58' — Dennis (substituted on) , Tony (substituted on) 58', Nandinho (substituted on) 82'

Sun, 29 Oct 2017 29	Petro Atlético	4–2	Santa Rita	11 de Novembro, Luanda
15:00 WAT (UTC+1)	Tony 31', 81'; Job 43' (pen.); Azulão 86'	Report	39', 90+2' Simão	Referee: Bernardo Moreira; Adão Silva, Aldair Carmelino
Note: Gerson / Ary, Maludi, Mira, Wilson / Balacai (substituted off) 53', Job (c), Manguxi (substituted off) 84', Tony / Diney, Nandinho (substituted off) 65' — Diógenes (substituted on) 53', Azulão (substituted on) 65', Pedro (substituted on) 84'

Sun, 05 Nov 2017 30	1º de Maio	1–0	Petro Atlético	Edelfride Costa, Benguela
15:00 WAT (UTC+1)	Kaporal 28'	Report		Referee: Miguel Mateus; Celestino Golombole, Celso António
Note: Lamá / Abdul, Ary (substituted off) 60', Eliseu, Mira / Balacai, Diógenes, Élio, Pedro / Dennis (substituted off) 67', Nandinho — Bebo (substituted on) 60', Job (substituted on) 67'

== Angola Cup ==
=== Results summary ===
Overall								Home						Away					
Pld	W	D	L	GF	GA	GD	Pts	W	D	L	GF	GA	GD	W	D	L	GF	GA	GD
7	5	1	1	7	4	+3	16	3	1	0	5	2	+3	2	0	1	2	2	0

Last updated: 11 November 2017.

=== Round of 16 ===
Sat, 23 Sep 2017 R16	J.G.M.	Walkover	Petro Atlético	Kurikutelas, Huambo
15:00 WAT (UTC+1)

Wed, 27 Sep 2017 R16	Petro Atlético	Walkover	J.G.M.	11 de Novembro, Luanda
15:00 WAT (UTC+1)

=== Quarter-finals ===
Sun, 08 Oct 2017 QF	S^{ta} Rita de Cássia	1–2	Petro Atlético	4 de Janeiro, Uíge
15:00 WAT (UTC+1)	Frank 53'		37' Manguxi; 40' Azulão	Referee: Rodrigues Aleixo; Nicodemos Calembela, Francisco Paulo
Note: Gerson / Mabiná, Maludi (substituted off) , Mateus, Wilson / Diney, Diógenes, Herenilson, Manguxi / Azulão (substituted off) , Tony (substituted off) — Abdul (substituted on) , Balacai (substituted on) , Dennis (substituted on)

Wed, 18 Oct 2017 QF	Petro Atlético	1–1	S^{ta} Rita de Cássia	11 de Novembro, Luanda
15:00 WAT (UTC+1)	Bruno 45+1' (o.g.)	Report	84' Mavambu	Referee: Romualdo Baltazar; José Felix, Luís Sá Miranda
Note: Gerson / Abdul (c), Ary, Maludi, Mira / Bebo, Herenilson (substituted off) 45', Manguxi (substituted off) 60', Tony / Balacai, Dennis (substituted off) 70' — Diney (substituted on) 45', Diógenes (substituted on) 60', Azulão (substituted on) 70'

=== Semi-finals ===
Thu, 26 Oct 2017 SF	Petro Atlético	2–0	Bravos Maquis	11 de Novembro, Luanda
16:00 WAT (UTC+1)	Azulão 17'; Job 87'	Report		Referee: Romualdo Baltazar; Jerson Emiliano, Estanislau Prata
Note: Gerson / Ary, Maludi, Mira, Wilson / Diógenes (substituted off) 85', Herenilson, Manguxi, Tony (substituted off) 46' / Azulão (substituted off) 90', Diney — Job (substituted on) 46', Nandinho (substituted on) 85', Dennis (substituted on) 90'

Wed, 01 Nov 2017 SF	Bravos Maquis	1–0	Petro Atlético	Mundunduleno, Luena
15:00 WAT (UTC+1)	Yuri 6'			Referee: Pedro dos Santos; Júlio Lemos, Luís Mateus
Note: Gerson / Ary, Diógenes, Maludi, Wilson / Herenilson, Job, Manguxi, Tony (substituted off) 90' / Azulão, Diney — Mira (substituted on) 90'

=== Final ===
Sat, 11 Nov 2017
16:00

Petro Atlético	2–1	1º de Agosto
Job 40'; Azulão 56'	Report	57' Diogo

Estádio 11 de Novembro, Luanda
Attendance: 30,000
Referee: João Goma

Petro	D'Agosto

GK	22	(Angola) Gerson	(yellow card) 87'
RB	2	(Angola) Mira
CB	5	(Angola) Élio
CB	15	(Angola) Wilson
LB	7	(Angola) Diógenes	(yellow card) 54'
RM	11	(Angola) Job (c)		(substituted off) 86'
CM	18	(Angola) Herenilson	(yellow card) 60'
CM	10	(Angola) Manguxi
LM	19	(Brazil) Tony
FW	20	(Brazil) Diney		(substituted off) 64'
FW	26	(Brazil) Azulão
Substitutions:
MF	24	(Angola) Pedro		(substituted on) 64'
DF	3	(Angola) Ary		(substituted on) 86'
–
Manager:
(Brazil) Beto Bianchi

GK	30	(Angola) Nuno
RB	19	(Angola) Paizo		(substituted off) 80'
CB	4	(Democratic Republic of the Congo) Bobo
CB	5	(Angola) Dani (c)
LB	3	(Angola) Natael
RM	14	(Angola) Nelson
CM	10	(Nigeria) Ibukun		(substituted off) 81'
CM	23	(Angola) Show	(yellow card) 33'
LM	9	(Angola) Buá	(yellow card) 54'	(substituted off) 75'
FW	6	(Portugal) Diogo
FW	11	(Angola) Geraldo
Substitutions:
MF	8	(Angola) Gogoró		(substituted on) 75'
MF	7	(Angola) Mingo Bile		(substituted on) 80'
FW	27	(Cape Verde) Rambé		(substituted on) 81'
Manager:
(Bosnia and Herzegovina) Dragan Jović

Assistant referees:
Ivanildo Lopes
Evanildo Martins

Fourth official:
António Cachala

Commissioner:
Jorge Mário Fernandes

== Season statistics ==
=== Appearances and goals ===
No.	Pos	Nat	Player	Total		League		Cup	
No.	Pos	Nat	Player	Apps	Goals	Apps	Goals	Apps	Goals
Goalkeepers
1	GK	(Angola) ANG	Lamá	1	0	1	0	0	0
22	GK	(Angola) ANG	Gerson	33	0	28	0	5	0
Defenders
2	DF	(Angola) ANG	Mira	30	0	25+1	0	3+1	0
3	DF	(Angola) ANG	Ary	33	0	28+1	0	3+1	0
4	DF	(Angola) ANG	Maludi	9	0	4+1	0	4	0
5	DF	(Angola) ANG	Élio	25	0	24	0	1	0
13	DF	(Angola) ANG	Eliseu	1	0	1	0	0	0
15	DF	(Angola) ANG	Wilson	26	2	21+1	2	4	0
21	DF	(Angola) ANG	Mabiná	4	0	3	0	1	0
25	DF	(Angola) ANG	Abdul	13	1	9+2	1	1+1	0
Midfielders
7	MF	(Angola) ANG	Diógenes	23	0	9+9	0	4+1	0
8	MF	(Angola) ANG	Carlinhos	20	4	15+5	4	0	0
10	MF	(Angola) ANG	Manguxi	33	5	26+2	4	5	1
11	MF	(Angola) ANG	Job	29	7	25+1	5	2+1	2
14	MF	(Angola) ANG	Mateus	21	1	11+9	1	1	0
16	MF	(Angola) ANG	Bebo	4	0	0+3	0	1	0
17	MF	(Angola) ANG	Nandinho	22	1	9+12	1	0+1	0
18	MF	(Angola) ANG	Herenilson	31	0	26	0	5	0
19	MF	(Brazil) BRA	Tony	28	6	14+9	6	5	0
20	MF	(Brazil) BRA	Rubinho	1	0	1	0	0	0
21	MF	(Angola) ANG	Mabiná	10	0	1+9	0	0	0
24	MF	(Angola) ANG	Pedro	2	0	1	0	0+1	0
Forwards
20	FW	(Brazil) BRA	Diney	17	1	12	1	4+1	0
23	FW	(Angola) ANG	Balacai	6	0	1+3	0	1+1	0
26	FW	(Angola) ANG	Azulão	28	18	22+1	15	4+1	3
28	FW	(Nigeria) NGR	Dennis	10	0	1+6	0	1+2	0
Opponents
3	DF	(Angola) ANG	Nzau	1	1	1	1	0	0
4	DF	(Angola) ANG	Oliveira	1	1	1	1	0	0
7	DF	(Angola) ANG	Bruno	1	1	0	0	1	1
Total
				385(87)	49	330(75)	42	55(12)	7

Last updated: 11 November 2017
Source: Competitions

=== Scorers ===
As of 11 November 2017

Rank	Name	League		Cup		Total	
Rank	Name	Apps	Goals	Apps	Goals	Apps	Goals
1	(Brazil) Azulão	22(1)	15	4(1)	3	26(2)	18
2	(Angola) Job	25(1)	5	2(1)	2	27(2)	7
3	(Brazil) Tony	14(9)	6	5	0	19(9)	6
4	(Angola) Carlinhos	15(5)	4	0		15(5)	4
5	(Angola) Manguxi	26(2)	3	5	1	31(2)	4
6	(Angola) Wilson	21(1)	2	4	0	25(1)	2
7	(Angola) Abdul	9(2)	1	1(1)	0	10(3)	1
8	(Angola) Nandinho	9(12)	1	(1)	0	9(13)	1
9	(Angola) Mateus	11(9)	1	1	0	12(9)	1
10	(Brazil) Diney	12	1	4(1)	0	16(1)	1
Own goal for							
1	(Angola) Nzau	1	1	0	0	1	1
1	(Angola) Oliveira	1	1	0	0	1	1
1	(Angola) Bruno	0	0	1	1	1	1
Total		42		7		49	

- Note: Numbers in parentheses indicate appearances as substitute.

=== Clean sheets ===
As of 11 November 2017

Rank	Name	League		Cup		Total		%
		Apps	CS	Apps	CS	Apps	CS	
1	(Angola) Gerson	29	15	5	1	34	16	47
2	(Angola) Lamá	1	0	0	0	1	0	0
3	(Angola) Mig	0	0	0	0	0	0	
Total			15		1		16	

=== Total results ===
Overall								Home						Away					
Pld	W	D	L	GF	GA	GD	Pts	W	D	L	GF	GA	GD	W	D	L	GF	GA	GD
37	25	3	9	53	24	+29	78	16	3	0	40	10	+30	9	0	9	13	14	−1

Last updated: 5 November 2017.

== See also ==
- List of Atlético Petróleos de Luanda players
