= 2016 Atlético Petróleos de Luanda season =

Atlético Petróleos de Luanda
2016 season
- President: (Angola) Tomás Faria
- Manager: (Brazil) Beto Bianchi (Jan 2016–)
- Stadium: Estádio 11 de Novembro
- Angola Cup: Semi-finals
- Top goalscorer: League: Azulão (9); All: Azulão (10)
- Biggest win: Petro 3–0 Sagrada (13 Aug 2016); Petro 3–0 Académica (6 Sep 2016); Petro 3–0 ASA (15 Oct 2016)
- Biggest defeat: Académica 2–0 Petro (28 Feb 2016)
Home colours	Away colours	Third colours
- All statistics correct as of 2 September 2016.

The 2016 season of Atlético Petróleos de Luanda is the club's 35th season in the Girabola, the Angolan Premier football League and 35th consecutive season in the top flight of Angolan football. In 2016, the club participated in the Girabola and the Angola Cup.

== Squad information ==
=== Players ===
No.	Nat	Nick	Name	Pos	Date of birth (age)
Goalkeepers
1	(Angola)	Lamá	Luís Maimona João	–	1 February 1981 (aged 35)
22	(Angola)	Gerson	Gerson Bruno da Costa Barros	–	1 April 1987 (aged 29)
Defenders
2	(Angola)	Mira	Daniel João Zongo Macuenho	LB	12 February 1991 (aged 25)
3	(Angola)	Ary	Ariclene Assunção Oliveira	LB	6 August 1992 (aged 24)
4	(Angola)	Maludi	Maludi Francisco Caxala	CB	12 June 1993 (aged 23)
7	(Cameroon)	Etah (c)	Michael Ntui Etah	CB	15 May 1984 (aged 32)
13	(Angola)	Miguel	Miguel Geraldo Quiame	LB	17 September 1991 (aged 25)
15	(Angola)	Wilson	Wilson Pinto Gaspar	CB	29 September 1990 (aged 26)
21	(Angola)	Mabiná	José Pedro Alberto	RB	2 August 1983 (aged 33)
25	(Angola)	Abdul	António Nzayinawo	LB	7 March 1994 (aged 22)
Midfielders
5	(Angola)	Élio	Élio Wilson Costa Martins	CM	20 December 1987 (aged 29)
6	(Angola)	Francis	Francisco Marta Agostinho da Rosa	MF	15 August 1993 (aged 23)
8	(Angola)	Chara	Fernando Agostinho da Costa	CM	10 October 1981 (aged 35)
10	(Angola)	Manguxi	Augusto António Domingos Quibeto	RW	27 November 1991 (aged 25)
14	(Angola)	Mateus	Mateus Gaspar Domingos	RW	20 August 1993 (aged 23)
17	(Angola)	Diógenes	Diógenes Capemba João	CM	1 January 1997 (aged 19)
18	(Angola)	Herenilson	Herenilson Caifalo do Carmo	CM	23 May 1996 (aged 20)
20	(Portugal)	Duarte	Duarte Jorge Gomes Duarte	RM	27 August 1987 (aged 29)
23	(Angola)	Balacai	Evaristo Maurício Pascoal	LW	13 August 1995 (aged 21)
24	(Angola)	Mavambu	Mavambu João Afonso Baptista	MF	27 July 1996 (aged 20)
26	(Brazil)	Tiago Azulão	Tiago Lima Leal	MF	26 March 1988 (aged 28)
30	(Angola)	Benvindo	Benvindo Afonso Nsianfumu	MF	6 June 1996 (aged 20)
Forwards
9	(Brazil)	Fabrício	Fabrício Santos Simões	–	23 December 1984 (aged 32)
11	(Angola)	Job	Ricardo Job Estévão	RW	27 September 1987 (aged 29)
16	(Angola)	Carlinhos	Carlos Sténio do Carmo	–	19 March 1995 (aged 21)
19	(Democratic Republic of the Congo)	Jiresse	Mawiya Tutona Jiresse	–	7 May 1992 (aged 24)

=== On loan ===
No.	Nat	Nick	Name	Pos	Date of birth (age)	To
Out
4	(Angola)	Maludi	Maludi Francisco Caxala	CB	12 June 1993 (aged 23)	(Angola) Desportivo Huíla

=== Pre-season transfers ===
No.	Nat	Nick	Name	Pos	Date of birth (age)	To
Transfers out
27	(Angola)	Jo	–	FW	–	n/a
18	(Angola)	Mabululu	Agostinho Cristóvão Paciência	FW	10 September 1989 (aged 27)	(Angola) Interclube
25	(Angola)	Tomé	Tomé Osvaldo Alberto	DF	–	n/a
4	(Angola)	Vado	Osvaldo P.J. Kitenga	DF	20 May 1993 (aged 23)	(Angola) Primeiro de Agosto
Transfers in
5	(Angola)	Élio	Élio Wilson Costa Martins	MF	20 December 1987 (aged 29)	(Angola) Kabuscorp
9	(Brazil)	Fabrício	Fabrício Santos Simões	FW	23 December 1984 (aged 32)	(Angola) Benfica Luanda
18	(Angola)	Herenilson	Herenilson Caifalo do Carmo	MF	23 May 1996 (aged 20)	(Angola) Junior team

=== Mid-season transfers ===
No.	Nat	Nick	Name	Pos	Date of birth (age)	From
Transfers in
26	(Brazil)	Tiago Azulão	Tiago Lima Leal	MF	26 March 1988 (aged 28)	(Brazil) Mogi Mirim

=== Staff ===
Nat	Name	Position(s)	Date of birth (age)
Technical staff
(Brazil)	Beto Bianchi	Head coach	6 November 1966 (aged 50)
(Angola)	Flávio Amado	Assistant coach	30 December 1979 (aged 37)
(Angola)	Jaime Silva Nejó	Assistant coach	25 July 1965 (aged 51)
(Brazil)	Adriano Soares	Goalkeeper coach	–
Medical
(Angola)	Nelson Bolivar	Physician	–
(Brazil)	Maurício Marques	Physio	–
(Angola)	Ramiro José	Masseur	–
Management
(Angola)	Tomás Faria	Chairman	–
(Angola)	Chico Afonso	Vice-chairman	–
(Angola)	Sidónio Malamba	Head of Foot Dept	–

== Overview ==
Competition	First match	Last match	Final position	Record							
Competition	First match	Last match	Final position	Pld	W	D	L	GF	GA	GD	Win %
Girabola	21 February 2016	5 November 2016	Runner-up	30	19	7	4	37	14	+23	63.33
Angola Cup	27 July 2016	2 October 2016	Semi-finals	3	2	0	1	9	6	+3	66.67
Total				33	21	7	5	46	20	+26	63.64

Last updated: 5 November 2016

== Angolan League ==
=== League table ===
Pos	Team	Pld	W	D	L	GF	GA	GD	Pts	Qualification or relegation
1	Primeiro de Agosto (C)	30	20	6	4	60	22	+38	66	Qualification for Champions League
2	Petro de Luanda	30	19	7	4	37	14	+23	64	
3	Recreativo do Libolo	30	17	9	4	49	26	+23	60	
4	Progresso LS	30	13	7	10	25	20	+5	46	
5	Kabuscorp	30	13	7	10	30	24	+6	46	

Updated to match(es) played on 5 November 2016. Source: Girabola.com
Rules for classification: 1) Points; 2) Head-to-head points; 3) Head-to-head goal difference; 4) Goal difference; 5) Goals scored; 6) Fair-play points; 7) Play-off.
(C) Champions

=== Results ===
==== Results summary ====
Overall								Home						Away					
Pld	W	D	L	GF	GA	GD	Pts	W	D	L	GF	GA	GD	W	D	L	GF	GA	GD
30	19	7	4	37	14	+23	64	12	2	1	23	5	+18	7	5	3	14	9	+5

Last updated: 4 November 2016.

==== Results by round ====
Round	1	2	3	4	5	6	7	8	9	10	11	12	13	14	15	16	17	18	19	20	21	22	23	24	25	26	27	28	29	30
Ground	H	A	H	A	H	A	H	A	H	A	H	A	A	H	A	A	H	A	H	A	H	A	H	A	H	A	H	H	A	H
Result	W	L	W	W	D	L	W	D	W	D	L	D	W	W	L	W	W	D	D	D	W	W	W	W	W	W	W	W	D	W
Position	5	9	7	3	4	8	4	4	3	2	3	3	3	3	3	3	3	3	3	3	3	3	3	3	3	3	2	2	2	2

Updated to match(es) played on 9 July 2016. Source: www.girabola.com
A = Away; H = Home; W = Win; D = Draw; L = Loss

=== Match details ===
Sun, 21 Feb 2016 01	Petro Atlético	1–0	4 de Abril	11 de Novembro, Luanda
18:00 WAT (UTC+01)	Chara (yellow card) 39'; Balacai 54'; Herenilson (yellow card) 67'	Report	Matamba (yellow card) 36'; Manucho (yellow card) 61'	Attendance: 4.000; Referee: António Caxala; Júlio Lemos, Wilson Ntyamba
Note: Gerson / Etah, Miguel, Mira, Wilson / Chara, Herenilson, Job (substituted off) 66', Manguxi (substituted off) 90' / Balacai, Fabrício (substituted off) 72' — Duarte (substituted on) 66', Jiresse (substituted on) 72', Francis (substituted on) 90'

Sun, 28 Feb 2016 02	Académica Lobito	2–0	Petro Atlético	Estádio do Buraco, Lobito
15:30 WAT (UTC+1)	Nelito 42'; Kadú 53' (pen.)		Job (yellow card) 57'; Jiresse (yellow card) 82'	Referee: Rodrigues Aleixo; Nicodemos Calembela, Francisco Van-Dúnem
Note: Gerson / Etah, Miguel, Mira, Wilson / Chara, Duarte (substituted off) 46', Herenilson, Mabiná (substituted off) 74' / Balacai, Fabrício (substituted off) 72' — Job (substituted on) 46', Jiresse (substituted on) 74'

Sun, 6 Mar 2016 03	Petro Atlético	1–0	Progresso LS	11 de Novembro, Luanda
18:00 WAT (UTC+1)	Élio (yellow card) 65'; Carlinhos 81'; Wilson (yellow card) 85'; Miguel (yellow card) 86'	Report		Attendance: 1.500; Referee: Hélder Calenga; Feliciano Tchalo, Tongo Pitra
Note: Gerson / Élio, Miguel, Mira, Wilson / Duarte (substituted off) 45', Herenilson, Job (substituted off) 75', Manguxi / Balacai (substituted off) 71', Fabrício — Carlinhos (substituted on) 45', Mavambu (substituted on) 71', Mateus (substituted on) 75'

Sun, 13 Mar 2016 04	Rec da Caála	1–2	Petro Atlético	Mártires da Canhala, Caála
16:00 WAT (UTC+1)	Landry 77'	Report	Mabiná 16'; Gerson (yellow card) 20'; Herenilson 48'; Mira (yellow card) 18' (yellow-red card) 62'	Attendance: 10.000; Referee: José Álvaro; Rosário Catombela, Pedro Nguelangue
Note: Gerson / Élio, Miguel, Mira, Wilson / Chara (c), Herenilson, Job (substituted off) 85', Manguxi / Jiresse (substituted off) 90+2', Mabiná (substituted off) 66' — Diógenes (substituted on) 66', Abdul (substituted on) 85', Carlinhos (substituted on) 90+2'

Sat, 2 Apr 2016 06	Sagrada Esperança	1–0	Petro Atlético	Sagrada Esperança, Dundo
15:00 WAT (UTC+1)	Rolli (yellow card) 23'; Miguel 32' (yellow card) 90+2'; Love (yellow card) 36'; Yuri (yellow card) 59'	Report	Chara (yellow card) 8'; Élio (yellow card) 29'; Miguel (yellow card) 53'	Referee: Rodrigues Aleixo; Paulo Van-Dúnem, Nicodemos Calembela
Note: Gerson / Élio, Mabiná, Miguel, Wilson / Carlinhos, Chara, Job, Manguxi (substituted off) 62' / Jiresse (substituted off) 78', Balacai (substituted off) 66' — Diógenes (substituted on) 62', Mavambu (substituted on) 66', Mateus (substituted on) 78'

Sat, 9 Apr 2016 07	Petro Atlético	1–0	Porcelana FC	11 de Novembro, Luanda
18:00 WAT (UTC+1)	Carlinhos (yellow card) 20' (goal) 67'; Mateus (yellow card) 40'	Report	Djamini (yellow card) 50'	Attendance: 2.000; Referee: Nuno Eduardo; Manuel Benguela, Nilton Almeida
Note: Gerson / Élio, Miguel, Mira, Wilson / Carlinhos, Chara (c), Diógenes (substituted off) 46', Herenilson / Job, Balacai (substituted off) 62' — Jiresse (substituted on) 46', Mateus (substituted on) 62'

Wed, 13 Apr 2016 05	Petro Atlético	1–1	Rec do Libolo	11 de Novembro, Luanda
16:00 WAT (UTC+1)	Balacai (yellow card) 55'; Herenilson (yellow card) 65'; Diógenes 75'; Miguel (yellow card) 83'; Jiresse (yellow card) 84'	Report	Edy Boyom (yellow card) 30'; Danny 80'	Attendance: 5.000; Referee: Osvaldo Felix; José Felix, Sebastião da Silva
Note: Gerson / Élio, Miguel, Mira, Wilson / Carlinhos, Chara, Herenilson, Manguxi (substituted off) 67' / Job (substituted off) 45', Balacai (substituted off) 57' — Diógenes (substituted on) 45', Jiresse (substituted on) 57', Mateus (substituted on) 67'

Mon, 18 Apr 2016 08	Desportivo Huíla	0–0	Petro Atlético	Estádio do Ferrovia, Lubango
15:30 WAT (UTC+1)	Chiwe (yellow card) 53'; Cassinda (yellow card) 78'	Report		Attendance: 7.000; Referee: Mário de Oliveira; Domingos Francisco, Luís Mateus
Note: Gerson / Abdul, Etah, Miguel, Wilson / Chara, Diógenes (substituted off) 74', Herenilson, Manguxi (substituted off) 64' / Balacai (substituted off) 45', Carlinhos — Mateus (substituted on) 45', Jiresse (substituted on) 64', Mavambu (substituted on) 74'

Sat, 23 Apr 2016 09	Petro Atlético	3–1	1º de Maio	11 de Novembro, Luanda
18:00 WAT (UTC+1)	Wilson (yellow card) 31'; Carlinhos 36'; Chara (yellow card) 39'; Mateus (yellow card) 45'; Job 45+1' (pen.); Muenho 59' (o.g.)	Report	Massinga 61'; Muenho (yellow card) 78'; Edson (yellow card) 90'	Attendance: 5.000; Referee: Romualdo Balatazar; Jerson Emiliano, Estanislau Guedes
Note: Gerson / Abdul, Etah, Miguel (substituted off) 70', Wilson / Chara, Diógenes, Herenilson, Mateus / Carlinhos, Job (substituted off) 77' — Ary (substituted on) 70', Balacai (substituted on) 77'

Fri, 29 Apr 2016 10	Kabuscorp	0–1	Petro Atlético	Cidadela, Luanda
16:00 WAT (UTC+1)	Mpele Mpele (yellow card) 88'; Bruno (yellow card) 90'	Report	Wilson 29'; Balacai (yellow card) 37'; Diógenes (yellow card) 55'	Attendance: 7.000; Referee: Pedro dos Santos; Pedro Fumba, Domingos Cordeiro
Note: Gerson / Abdul, Etah, Mabiná, Wilson / Carlinhos (substituted off) 73', Chara, Diógenes, Herenilson / Balacai (substituted off) 79', Job (substituted off) 90+5' — Manguxi (substituted on) 73', Mateus (substituted on) 79', Élio (substituted on) 90+5'

Sat, 7 May 2016 11	Petro Atlético	1–2	Interclube	Coqueiros, Luanda
18:00 WAT (UTC+1)	Abdul 44'; Etah (yellow card) 47'	Report	Rico (yellow card) 20' (goal) 35'; Valdez (yellow card) 72'; Paz (yellow card) 77'; Moco 90'	Attendance: 5.000; Referee: António Dungula; Tito Capingala, José Siliya
Note: Gerson / Abdul, Etah, Mabiná, Wilson / Carlinhos (substituted off) 51', Chara (c), Diógenes (substituted off) 25', Herenilson / Balacai, Job — Jiresse (substituted on) 25', Élio (substituted on) 51'

Sun, 15 May 2016 12	ASA	0–0	Petro Atlético	Coqueiros, Luanda
18:00 WAT (UTC+1)	Minguito (yellow card) 17'		Job (yellow card) 67'	Referee: Paulo Sérgio; Tomás Lima, Segunda Tchisseque
Note: Gerson / Etah, Miguel, Mira, Wilson / Abdul, Duarte (substituted off) , Diógenes, Herenilson / Fabrício (substituted off) , Job (substituted off) — Manguxi (substituted on) , Mateus (substituted on) , Carlinhos (substituted on)

Sat, 21 May 2016 13	Progresso Sambizanga	0–2	Petro Atlético	Cidadela, Luanda
15:30 WAT (UTC+1)	Gérard (yellow card) 35'	Report	Wilson (yellow card) 45' (goal) 62'; Etah (yellow card) 59'; Jiresse 88'	Attendance: 2.000; Referee: António Caxala; Wilson Ntiamba, Estanislau Guedes
Note: Gerson / Ary, Etah (c), Mabiná, Wilson / Carlinhos (substituted off) 90', Diógenes, Herenilson, Manguxi / Balacai (substituted off) 90', Fabrício (substituted off) 45+2' — Jiresse (substituted on) 45+2', Chara (substituted on) 90', Duarte (substituted on) 90'

Sun, 29 May 2016 14	Petro Atlético	2–0	Benfica Luanda	11 de Novembro, Luanda
18:00 WAT (UTC+1)	Manguxi 6'; Diógenes 19'; Ary (yellow card) 36'; Jiresse (yellow card) 68'	Report	Élber (yellow card) 84'	Attendance: 1.000; Referee: Hélder Martins; Júlio Lemos, Joaquim da Rocha
Note: Gerson / Ary (substituted off) 44', Etah (c), Mabiná, Wilson / Carlinhos, Diógenes, Herenilson, Manguxi / Balacai (substituted off) 64', Jiresse (substituted off) 71' — Abdul (substituted on) 44', Duarte (substituted on) 64', Fabrício (substituted on) 71'

Sat, 11 Jun 2016 15	1º de Agosto	1–0	Petro Atlético	11 de Novembro, Luanda
18:00 WAT (UTC+1)	Isaac 3'; Paizo (yellow card) 44'; Sargento (yellow card) 60'; Buá (yellow card) 79'	Report	Jiresse (yellow card) 42'; Job (yellow card) 64'; Wilson (yellow card) 75'	Attendance: 15.000; Referee: Osvaldo Felix; Sebastião da Silva, José Felix
Note: Gerson / Etah, Mabiná, Mira, Wilson / Carlinhos, Chara (c), Diógenes (substituted off) 27', Herenilson / Balacai (substituted off) 57', Jiresse (substituted off) 80' — Job (substituted on) 27', Mateus (substituted on) 57', Fabrício (substituted on) 80'

Tue, 12 Jul 2016 16	4 de Abril	0–1	Petro Atlético	Estádio Municipal, Menongue
15:00 WAT (UTC+1)	Campos (yellow card) 20'	Report	Job 11'; Etah (yellow card) 30'; Herenilson (yellow card) 60'; Mira (yellow card) 90'	Attendance: 3.000; Referee: Nuno Eduardo; Manuel Benguela, Oldair Armando
Note: Gerson / Etah, Miguel, Mira, Wilson / Herenilson, Job (c), Manguxi, Mateus / Fabrício, Azulão

Sun, 17 Jul 2016 17	Petro Atlético	1–0	Académica Lobito	11 de Novembro, Luanda
18:00 WAT (UTC+1)	Diógenes 65'	Report	Higino (yellow card) 23'; Osório (yellow card) 62'; Ibraime (yellow card) 83'	Attendance: 2.000; Referee: José Maxia; Evanildo Martins, Joaquim da Rocha
Note: Gerson / Etah, Miguel, Mira, Wilson / Herenilson, Job (c), Manguxi, Mateus (substituted off) 83' / Azulão (substituted off) 46', Jiresse (substituted off) 64' — Carlinhos (substituted on) 46', Diógenes (substituted on) 64', Mavambu (substituted on) 83'

Sat, 23 Jul 2016 18	Progresso LS	2–2	Petro Atlético	Mangueiras, Saurimo
15:00 WAT (UTC+1)	René (yellow card) 51'; Mauro (yellow card) 57'; Wilson (yellow card) 90+3'; Mongo 43', 90+4'	Report	Azulão 8', 17'; Miguel (yellow card) 21' (yellow-red card) 82'	Attendance: 7.000; Referee: Benjamim Andrade; Bernabé Ngulo, Judith Mestre
Note: Gerson / Etah, Miguel, Mira, Wilson / Herenilson, Job, Manguxi, Mateus (substituted off) 63' / Azulão (substituted off) 88', Carlinhos (substituted off) 64' — Francis (substituted on) 63', Fabrício (substituted on) 77', Chara (substituted on) 88'

Sat, 30 Jul 2016 19	Petro Atlético	1–1	Rec da Caála	11 de Novembro, Luanda
18:00 WAT (UTC+1)	Azulão 88'	Report	Landry (yellow card) 50'	Attendance: 2.000; Referee: Armando da Silva; Miguel Luvumbo, Manuel Lobe
Note: Gerson / Etah, Miguel, Mira, Wilson / Chara (c) (substituted off) , Diógenes (substituted off) 39', Herenilson, Manguxi (substituted off) 76' / Azulão, Job — Mateus (substituted on) 39', Carlinhos (substituted on) 76', Fabrício (substituted on)

Sun, 7 Aug 2016 20	Rec do Libolo	1–1	Petro Atlético	Estádio Municipal, Calulo
15:00 WAT (UTC+1)	Kaya 65'		Francis 37'	Referee: António Caxala
Note: Gerson / Élio, Etah, Mira, Wilson / Francis (substituted off) 74', Herenilson, Mabiná, Manguxi (substituted off) 57' / Azulão, Job (substituted off) 80' — Fabrício (substituted on) 57', Carlinhos (substituted on) 74' Mateus (substituted on) 80'

Sat, 13 Aug 2016 21	Petro Atlético	3–0	Sagrada Esperança	11 de Novembro, Luanda
18:00 WAT (UTC+1)	Fabrício 14', 66'; Azulão (yellow card) 50' (goal) 90+2'; Job (yellow card) 63'	Report	Tresor (yellow card) 40'; Joka (yellow card) 52'	Attendance: 1.000; Referee: José Maxia; Joaquim Rocha, Rosário Pedro
Note: Gerson / Ary, Élio (c), Mira, Wilson / Francis (substituted off) 64', Herenilson, Job (substituted off) 82', Manguxi / Azulão, Fabrício (substituted off) 72' — Mateus (substituted on) 64', Chara (substituted on) 72', Balacai (substituted on) 82'

Sun, 21 Aug 2016 22	Porcelana FC	0–1	Petro Atlético	Santos Dinis, Ndalatando
15:00 WAT (UTC+1)	Makuntima (yellow card) 90'	Report	Azulão 8'; Wilson (yellow card) 45'	Attendance: 6.000; Referee: Nuno Eduardo; Manuel Benguela, Nilton Armando
Note: Gerson / Ary, Élio (c), Mira, Wilson / Diógenes (substituted off) 65', Francis (substituted off) 45', Herenilson, Manguxi / Azulão, Fabrício (substituted off) 74' — Mateus (substituted on) 45', Duarte (substituted on) 65', Balacai (substituted on) 74'

Sat, 10 Sep 2016 23	Petro Atlético	2–0	Desportivo Huíla	11 de Novembro, Luanda
18:00 WAT (UTC+1)	Job 18', 54'	Report		Attendance: 1.500; Referee: António Dungula; Tito Capingala, José Siliya
Note: Gerson / Ary, Élio, Mira, Wilson / Carlinhos, Diógenes (substituted off) 66', Herenilson, Job (c) / Azulão (substituted off) 89', Balacai (substituted off) 86' — Fabrício (substituted on) 66', Mabiná (substituted on) 86', Chara (substituted on) 89'

Sun, 16 Sep 2016 24	1º de Maio	0–2	Petro Atlético	Edelfride Costa, Benguela
15:00 WAT (UTC+1)	Bugo Jazz (yellow card) 24' (yellow-red card) 54'; Dino (yellow card) 33'; Edson (yellow card) 80'	Report	Azulão 34' (pen.); Manguxi (yellow card) 62'; Job 73' (pen.)	Referee: Hélder Calenga; Rosário Calembela, Pedro Nguelengue
Note: Gerson / Ary, Élio, Mira, Wilson / Carlinhos (substituted off) 45', Herenilson, Job (substituted off) 77', Manguxi / Azulão (substituted off) 85', Balacai — Chara (substituted on) 45', Mabiná (substituted on) 77', Fabrício (substituted on) 85'

Sat, 24 Sep 2016 25	Petro Atlético	1–0	Kabuscorp	11 de Novembro, Luanda
18:00 WAT (UTC+1)	Ary (yellow card) 22'; Wilson (yellow card) 29'; Mabiná (yellow card) 65'; Azulão 87'	Report	Bruno (yellow card) 86'	Attendance: 15.000; Referee: João Ngoma; Luís Sá Miranda, Orlando Pimenta
Note: Gerson / Ary, Élio, Mira (substituted off) 46', Wilson / Carlinhos (substituted off) 59', Herenilson, Job (c), Manguxi / Azulão, Balacai (substituted off) 54' — Mabiná (substituted on) 46', Mateus (substituted on) 54', Fabrício (substituted on) 59'

Sat, 9 Oct 2016 26	Interclube	1–2	Petro Atlético	22 de Junho, Luanda
15:00 WAT (UTC+1)	Moco 57' (yellow card) 73'; Pirolito (yellow card) 85'	Report	Fabrício 7', 51' (yellow card) 50'; Mira (yellow card) 50'; Manguxi (yellow card) 61'	Attendance: 8.000; Referee: Benjamin Andrade; Barnabé Ngulo, Judith Mestre
Note: Gerson / Ary, Élio, Mira, Wilson / Francis (substituted off) 45', Herenilson, Job (substituted off) 72', Manguxi / Azulão, Fabrício (substituted off) 80' — Mabiná (substituted on) 45', Balacai (substituted on) 72', Chara (substituted on) 80'

Sat, 15 Oct 2016 27	Petro Atlético	3–0	ASA	11 de Novembro, Luanda
16:00 WAT (UTC+1)	Francis (yellow card) 13'; Carlinhos 46'; Fabrício 62'; Élio 72'		(yellow card) 11' Gerry; (yellow card) 23' Guelor	Referee: António Caxala; Júlio Lemos, Rosário Pedro
Note: Gerson / Ary, Élio, Mira, Wilson / Francis (substituted off) 45', Herenilson, Job (c), Manguxi (substituted off) 45' / Azulão (substituted off) 75', Fabrício — Mateus (substituted on) 45', Carlinhos (substituted on) 45', Chara (substituted on) 75'

Sun, 23 Oct 2016 28	Petro Atlético	1–0	Progresso	11 de Novembro, Luanda
15:30 WAT (UTC+01:00)	Azulão 50'; Élio (yellow card) 75'	Report	(yellow card) 20' Luís; (yellow card) 27' Nyamé; (yellow card) 35' Ndieu	Attendance: 7.000; Referee: Rodrigues Aleixo; Nicodemos Calembela, Paulo Van-Dúnem
Note: Gerson / Ary, Élio, Mira, Wilson / Balacai (substituted off) 45', Carlinhos (substituted off) 45', Herenilson, Job (c) (substituted off) 69' / Azulão, Fabrício — Mateus (substituted on) 45', Manguxi (substituted on) 45', Francis (substituted on) 69'

Sat, 29 Oct 2016 29	Benfica Luanda	0–0	Petro Atlético	Coqueiros, Luanda
15:30 WAT (UTC+01:00)	Gomito II (yellow card) 61'; Debele (yellow card) 68'; Fernando (yellow card) 90+3'	Report	(yellow card) 65' Herenilson	Attendance: 5.000; Referee: Pedro dos Santos; Pedro Futa, Domingos Cordeiro
Note: Gerson / Ary, Élio, Mabiná (substituted off) 79', Wilson / Carlinhos (substituted off) 55', Herenilson, Job (c), Manguxi (substituted off) 90+1' / Azulão, Fabrício — Mateus (substituted on) 55', Balacai (substituted on) 79', Francis (substituted on) 90+1'

Sat, 05 Nov 2016 30	Petro Atlético	1–0	1º de Agosto	11 de Novembro, Luanda
15:30 WAT (UTC+1)	Herenilson (yellow card) 31'; Azulão 33'; Carlinhos (yellow card) 58'; Mira (yellow card) 72'	Report	(yellow card) 78' Fissy	Attendance: 20.000; Referee: Paulo Talaia; Ricardo Rangel, Ivanildo Lopes
Note: Gerson / Ary, Élio, Mira, Wilson / Carlinhos, Diógenes (substituted off) 59', Herenilson, Manguxi / Azulão (substituted off) 77', Job (c) (substituted off) 80' — Mabiná (substituted on) 59', Fabrício (substituted on) 77', Mateus (substituted on) 80'

== FESA Tournament ==
=== Preliminary round ===
Sat, 27 Aug 2016	Petro Atlético	0–2	1º de Agosto	Coqueiros, Luanda
15:00 WAT (UTC+1)	Francis (yellow card) 20'; Lamá (yellow card) 35'; Élio (yellow card) 44'; Miguel (yellow card) 58'	Report	Diakité (yellow card) 12'; Geraldo 35' (pen.); Ibukun (yellow card) 45'; Etah 54' (o.g.); Paizo (yellow card) 83'	Attendance: 7.000; Referee: Aílton Carmelino; Ivanildo Lopes, Ismael Leitão
Note: Lamá / Ary, Élio, Etah, Miguel, Mira / Carlinhos (substituted off) 46', Chara (c) (substituted off) 66', Francis (substituted off) 46', Mabiná / Balacai (substituted off) 46', Job (substituted off) 46' — Duarte (substituted on) 46', Jiresse (substituted on) 46', Mateus (substituted on) 46', Mavambu (substituted on) 46', Diógenes (substituted on) 66'

=== 3rd place match ===
Sun, 28 Aug 2016	Petro Atlético	1–0	Progresso	Coqueiros, Luanda
15:00 WAT (UTC+1)	Fabrício 29'	Report		Attendance: 5.000; Referee: Pedro dos Santos; Adão da Silva, Ordreia Miguel
Note: Lamá / Ary, Élio, Etah, Mira, Wilson / Carlinhos (substituted off) , Duarte, Francis (substituted off) , Mateus / Balacai (substituted off) 46', Job (substituted off) 46' — Chara (substituted on) , Jiresse (substituted on) , Mabiná (substituted on) , Mavambu (substituted on)

== Angola Cup ==
=== Round of 16 ===
Wed, 27 Jul 2016	J.G.M.	1–1 (a.e.t.) (3–4 p)	Petro Atlético	Kurikutelas, Huambo
16:00	Kilombo 28'	Report	Azulão 11'	Attendance: 4.000; Referee: Pedro dos Santos; Domingos Francisco, Félix António
	Penalties
	Kilombo (penalty missed) ? (penalty missed); Adilson (penalty scored); Lobato (penalty scored); Rafa (penalty scored)		(penalty scored) Ary; (penalty scored) Etah; (penalty scored) Mira; (penalty scored) Azulão
Note: Gerson / Ary, Élio, Etah, Mira / Diógenes, Francis (substituted off) 45', Herenilson, Mateus (substituted off) 45' / Azulão, Duarte (substituted off) 61' — Jiresse (substituted on) 45', Manguxi (substituted on) 45', Mavambu (substituted on) 61'

=== Quarter-finals ===
Tue, 6 Sep 2016	Académica Lobito	0–3	Petro Atlético	Lobito
15:00	Lourenço (yellow card) 28'	Report	Duarte (yellow card); Mateus (yellow card) (goal) 29'; Job 66'; Balacai 70'	Stadium: Estádio do Buraco; Referee: António Caxala; Wilson Ntyamba, Rosário Pedro

=== Semi-finals ===
Sun, 2 Oct 2016	Rec Libolo	2–1	Petro Atlético	Calulo
15:00	Erivaldo 54'; Phellype 56'; Natael (yellow card) 64'; Manaia (yellow card) 90+3'	Report	7' (yellow card) 70' Job; (red card) 51' Abdul	Stadium: Estádio Municipal; Attendance: 5.000; Referee: Romualdo Baltazar; Jerson Emiliano, Rosário Calembela
Note: Gerson / Ary, Abdul, Mira, Wilson / Élio, Francis (substituted off) 87', Herenilson, Job (c) (substituted off) 77' / Azulão, Balacai (substituted off) 62' — Manguxi (substituted on) 62', Mateus (substituted on) 77', Fabrício (substituted on) 87'

== Season statistics ==
=== Appearances and goals ===
No.	Pos	Nat	Player	Total		League		Cup	
No.	Pos	Nat	Player	Apps	Goals	Apps	Goals	Apps	Goals
Goalkeepers
22	GK	(Angola) ANG	Gerson	28	0	28	0	0	0
Defenders
2	DF	(Angola) ANG	Mira	20	0	20	0	0	0
3	DF	(Angola) ANG	Ary	13	0	12+1	0	0	0
5	DF	(Angola) ANG	Élio	18	1	16+2	1	0	0
7	DF	(Angola) ANG	Etah	13	0	13	0	0	0
8	DF	(Angola) ANG	Chara	17	0	11+6	0	0	0
13	DF	(Angola) ANG	Miguel	12	0	12	0	0	0
15	DF	(Angola) ANG	Wilson	28	2	28	2	0	0
21	DF	(Angola) ANG	Mabiná	14	1	9+5	1	0	0
25	DF	(Angola) ANG	Abdul	6	1	4+2	1	0	0
Midfielders
6	MF	(Angola) ANG	Francis	8	1	5+3	1	0	0
10	MF	(Angola) ANG	Manguxi	22	1	21+1	1	0	0
11	MF	(Angola) ANG	Job	24	7	23+1	5	0	2
14	MF	(Angola) ANG	Mateus	18	1	4+14	0	0	1
16	MF	(Angola) ANG	Carlinhos	23	4	17+6	4	0	0
17	MF	(Angola) ANG	Diógenes	16	3	12+4	3	0	0
18	MF	(Angola) ANG	Herenilson	27	1	27	1	0	0
20	MF	(Portugal) POR	Duarte	5	0	1+4	0	0	0
24	MF	(Angola) ANG	Mavambu	4	0	0+4	0	0	0
Forwards
9	FW	(Brazil) BRA	Fabrício	19	5	10+9	5	0	0
19	FW	(Democratic Republic of the Congo) COD	Jiresse	11	1	5+6	1	0	0
23	FW	(Angola) ANG	Balacai	20	2	15+5	1	0	1
26	FW	(Angola) ANG	Azulão	15	10	15	9	0	1
Opponents
15	DF	(Angola) ANG	Muenho	1	1	1	1	0	0
Total
				308	42		37		5

Last updated: 5 November 2016
Source: Competitions

=== Scorers ===
As of 5 November 2016

Rank	Name	League		Cup		Total
Rank	Name	Apps	Goals	Apps	Goals	Goals
1	(Brazil) Azulão		9	2	1	10
2	(Angola) Job		5		2	7
3	(Brazil) Fabrício		5			5
4	(Angola) Carlinhos		4			4
5	(Angola) Diógenes		3			3
6	(Angola) Wilson		2			2

=== Clean sheets ===
As of 15 November 2016

Rank	Name	League		Cup		Total		%
		Apps	CS	Apps	CS	Apps	CS	
1	(Angola) Gerson	28	19	3	1	32	20	62
2	(Angola) Lamá	0	0	0	0	0	0	0
3	(Angola) Mig	0	0	0	0	0	0	
Total			19		1		20	

== See also ==
- List of Atlético Petróleos de Luanda players
