= List of Atlético Petróleos de Luanda players =

Atlético Petróleos de Luanda is an Angolan football (soccer) club based in Luanda, Angola and plays at Estádio 11 de Novembro. The club was established in 1982.

== 2020–2021 ==
Atlético Petróleos de Luanda players 2020–2021

Nat	#	Nick	Name	A	P	M.A.	Total Apps & Gls		
Nat	#	Nick	Name	A	P	2021	Total Apps & Gls		
Nat	#	Nick	Name	A	P	^{C}	^{S}	^{A}	^{G}
(Angola)	20	Além	Alberto Adão Campos Miguel	24	MF	2021	3		
(Brazil)	26	Azulão	Tiago Lima Leal	33	FW	2021	5		
(Angola)	29	Danilson	Daniel José Kilola	22	DF	2021	4		
(Angola)	8	Dany	Silas Daniel Satonho	31	MF	2021	7		
(Angola)	7	Diógenes	Diógenes Capemba João	24	DF	2021	9		
(Angola)	1	Dominique	Signori Dominique Nymi António	27	GK	2021	1		
(Angola)	16	Dos Santos	Santos Nkiambi Kiaku	20	MF	2021	2		
(Angola)	25	Eddie	Eddie Marcos Melo Afonso	27	DF	2021	5		
(Angola)	12	Elber	Jorge Mota Faial Delgado	30	GK	2021	3		
(Angola)	22	Gerson	Gerson Bruno da Costa Barros	34	GK	2021	8		
(Angola)	3	Ito	Mário Manuel de Oliveira	27	MF	2021	1		
(Angola)	6	Joaquim Adão	Joaquim Adão Lungieki João	29	MF	2021	1		
(Angola)	11	Job	Ricardo Job Estévão	34	FW	2021	14		
(Angola)	24	Kelson	Euclides Moisés Fernando dos Santos	21	DF	2021	1		
(Ghana)	31	Lisandro	Luís Venâncio Direito		MF	2021	1		
(Brazil)	27	Maikon	Maikon Fernando Souza Leite	33	MF	2021	1		
(Angola)	10	Manguxi	Augusto António Domingos Quibeto	30	MF	2021	7		
(Angola)	5	Matuwila	José-Junior Matuwila	30	DF	2021	1		
(Angola)	37	Maya	Mauro Macuta Simão	17	MF	2021	3		
(Angola)	14	Megue	Pedro Pessoa Miguel	25	MF	2021	3		
(Ghana)	17	Mensah	Isaac Mensah	26	MF	2021	3		
(Angola)	34	Messias	José Zengo		MF	2021	1		
(Angola)	32	Mindinho	Armando Canji	17	DF	2021	1		
(Ghana)	4	Musah	Musah Inusah	27	DF	2021	3		
(Angola)	35	Nelinho	Manuel Zange Miguel	19	MF	2021	1		
(Angola)	28	Pedro	Pedro Bondo	17	DF	2021	1		
(Angola)	2	Picas	Hermenegildo Domingos Sengui	20	MF	2021	2		
(Angola)	13	Tó Carneiro	Augusto de Jesus Corte-Real Carneiro	26	DF	2021	3		
(Brazil)	19	Tony	António Rosa Ribeiro	29	FW	2021	5		
(Angola)	18	Vidinho	Victor Pedro Nangue	23	DF	2021	1		
(Angola)	15	Wilson	Wilson Pinto Gaspar	31	DF	2021	7		
(Angola)	28	Yano	Adriano Belmiro Duarte Nicolau	29	FW	2021	2		
		Opponents							
Years						2021	Total		X

== 2011–2021 ==
Atlético Petróleos de Luanda players 2011–2021

Nat	Nick	Name	A	P	B.P.	M.M.	M.G.	J.D.	A.G.	Beto Bianchi									Tony Cosano (Note: Cosano replaced Bianchi in March 2019)						Total Apps & Gls			
Nat	Nick	Name	A	P	2011	2012	2013	2014	2015	2016 (2nd)			2017 (2nd)			2018 (2nd)			2018–19 (2nd)			2019-20			Total Apps & Gls			
Nat	Nick	Name	A	P	3	3	4	5	8	^{#}	^{A}	^{G}	^{#}	^{A}	^{G}	^{#}	^{A}	^{G}	^{#}	^{A}	^{G}	^{#}	^{A}	^{G}	^{S}	^{A}	^{G}	
(Angola)	Abdul	António Nzayinawo	23	DF	→	–	29	25	5	25	^{4(2)}	^{1}	25	^{10(3)}	^{1}	→									6			
(Ghana)	Acheampong	Benjamin Acheampong	24	FW			17	17																	2			
(Angola)	Além	Alberto Adão Campos Miguel	–	MF												→			20	^{22(9)}	^{0}	20	^{26(1)}	^{0}	↑			
(Angola)	Ary Oliveira	Ariclene Assunção Oliveira	28	DF			→	3	3	3	^{12(1)}	^{0}	3	^{31(2)}	^{0}	3	^{15(1)}	^{0}	3	^{1(2)}	^{0}	3	^{4}	^{0}	7			→
(Angola)	Augusto Mualucano	Augusto Monteiro Mualucano	22	GK						→			30	^{DNP}		30	^{DNP}		30	^{DNP}		30	^{DNP}		4			→
(Angola)	Avex	Avelino Eduardo António Craque	27	MF	14	→																			2			
(Brazil)	Azulão	Tiago Lima Leal	–	FW						26	^{15}	^{10}	26	^{26(2)}	^{18}	26	^{29(1)}	^{21}	26	^{39(2)}	^{20}	→			↑			
(Angola)	Balacai	Evaristo Maurício Pascoal	22	MF					23	23	^{15(5)}	^{2}	23	^{2(4)}	^{0}	→									3			
(Angola)	Bastos	Bartolomeu Jacinto Quissanga	22	DF	34	27	27																		3			
(Angola)	Bebo	Manuel João Miguel da Costa	18	MF					→	35	^{DNP}		16	^{1(3)}	^{0}	→									2			
(Senegal)	Ben Traoré	Naman Traoré	26	FW		19	19	19																	3			
(Angola)	Benvindo Afonso	Benvindo Miguel André Afonso	19	MF									→			16	^{(1)}	^{0}	16	^{1(8)}	^{0}	16	^{(1)}	^{1}	3			
(Angola)	Benvindo Nsianfumu	Benvindo Afonso Nsianfumu	20	GK				31	30	30	^{DNP}		→												3			
(Angola)	Borges, Cláudio	Cláudio Ricardo Cunha Borges	31	DF		→	15	15	→																2			
(Angola)	Buá	Luvumbo Lourenço Pedro	25	MF		→	9	→																	2			
(Angola)	Bugos	Roandro Ivan da Fonseca Semedo	30	MF									→			27	^{1(1)}	^{0}	27	^{DNP}		27	^{1(3)}	^{0}	3			→
(Angola)	Caranga	Jorge Mendes Corte-Real Carneiro	28	MF												→			21	^{18(15)}	^{1}	21	^{8(9)}	^{0}	2			→
(Angola)	Carlinhos	Carlos Stelvio F. Guimarães do Carmo	24	MF				33	16	16	^{17(6)}	^{4}	8	^{15(5)}	^{4}	8	^{12(6)}	^{1}	8	^{6(14)}	^{2}	→			6			
(Angola)	Cassoma	António Hélder Miranda Cassoma	29	DF	25	25	25																		9			
(Angola)	Chara Costa	Fernando Agostinho da Costa	35	MF	8	8	8	8	8	8	^{11(6)}	^{0}	→												15			
(Angola)	Chiló	Francisco Ananias Orlando	22	FW	29	29	→																		2			
(Angola)	Chora Ginga	Fernando Quitanda Ginga	27	DF			→	2	→																1			
(Angola)	Dadão Pedro	Manuel Nzagi Pedro	20	GK	31	31	→																		2			
(Angola)	Danilson Kilola	Daniel José Kilola	–	DF									→			29	^{11(2)}	^{0}	29	^{34}	^{0}	29	^{10}	^{0}	↑			
(Angola)	Dany Satonho	Silas Daniel Satonho	–	MF	26	26	26	→											→			8	^{26(5)}	^{6}	↑			
(Angola)	David Magalhães	David Dinis Magalhães	29	FW	27	→																			7			
(Angola)	Day Day	Zaldivar Doval Augusto Cambinda	21	MF	28	28	→																		5			
(Nigeria)	Dennis	Dennis Sesugh	24	FW									28	^{2(8)}	^{0}	9	^{6(8)}	^{1}	9	^{1(3)}	^{0}				3			
(Brazil)	Diney	Valdisney Costa dos Santos	27	MF									20	^{16(1)}	^{1}	20	^{21(5)}	^{2}	→					^{1}	2			
(Angola)	Diógenes	Diógenes Capemba João	–	DF			34	34	17	17	^{12(4)}	^{3}	7	^{13(10)}	^{0}	7	^{10(3)}	^{0}	7	^{19(6)}	^{0}	7	^{23(4)}	^{0}	↑			
(Angola)	Dolly Menga	Dolly Domingos Menga	27	FW															→			24	^{2(8)}	^{0}	1			
(Angola)	Dos Santos	Santos Nkiambi Kiaku	–	MF															→			31	^{2(1)}		↑			
(Portugal)	Duarte	Duarte Jorge Gomes Duarte	29	MF				→	20	20	^{1(4)}	^{0}	→												2			
(Angola)	Eddie Afonso	Eddie Marcos Melo Afonso	–	DF			31	→					→			25	^{23}	^{0}	25	^{37(1)}	^{0}	25	^{14(1)}	^{0}	↑			
(Angola)	Elber	Jorge Mota Faial Delgado	–	GK												→			12	^{25}	^{0}	12	^{25}	^{0}	↑			
(Angola)	Élio	Élio Wilson Costa Martins	32	DF					→	5	^{16(2)}	^{1}	5	^{25}	^{0}	5	^{26}	^{4}	5	^{7(3)}	^{0}	→			4			
(Angola)	Eliseu Cabanga	Eliseu Lucas Carlos Cabanga	21	DF						→			13	^{1}	^{0}	13	^{DNP}		→						2			
(Cameroon)	Etah	Michael Ntui Etah	32	DF	7	7	7	7	7	7	^{13}	^{0}	→												10			
(Brazil)	Fabrício Simões	Fabrício Santos Simões	32	FW						9	^{10(9)}	^{5}	→												1			
(Zambia)	Felix Katongo	Felix Katongo	29	MF		10	10																		3			
(Angola)	Filhão	João Gomes de Oliveira	20	FW			32	32	19																3			
(Angola)	Flávio	Flávio da Silva Amado	35	FW			16	16																	8			
(Angola)	Francis	Francisco Marta Agostinho da Rosa	25	MF				9	6	6	^{5(3)}	^{1}	–			21	^{9(9)}	^{1}	→						4			
(Angola)	Gerson Barros	Gerson Bruno da Costa Barros	–	GK			→	22	22	22	^{28}	^{0}	22	^{33}	^{0}	22	^{31}	^{0}	22	^{20}	^{0}	22	^{11}	^{0}	↑			
(Angola)	Gilberto	Felisberto Sebastião da Graça Amaral	32	MF			10	10	→																6			
(Angola)	Gladilson	Tangu Gastão	19	FW												→			33	^{DNP}		33	^{(1)}	^{0}	2			
(Angola)	Gomito Fonseca	Nelson Sumbo Fonseca	27	DF									→			6	^{1}	^{0}				→			1			
(Brazil)	Harrison	Harrison Cardoso de Oliveira	26	MF									→			16	^{3}	^{1}							1			
(Angola)	Herenilson	Herenilson Caifalo do Carmo	24	MF						18	^{27}	^{1}	18	^{31}	^{0}	18	^{30}	^{0}	18	^{40(1)}	^{1}	18	^{15(8)}	^{1}	5			→
(Angola)	Isaac Costa	Isaac Correia da Costa	23	DF			13	13	→																2			
(Rwanda)	Jacques Tuyisenge	Jacques Tuyisenge	29	FW															→			9	^{15(8)}	^{4}	1			→
(Angola)	Jamuana	Manuel Alexandre Jamuana	27	DF	17	→																			5			
(Democratic Republic of the Congo)	Jiresse	Mawiya Tutona Jiresse	24	FW					28	19	^{5(6)}	^{1}	→												1			
(Angola)	Jó Paciência	Joaquim Cristóvão Paciência	19	FW					27	→															1			
(Angola)	Job	Ricardo Job Estévão	–	FW	11	11	11	11	11	11	^{23(1)}	^{7}	11	^{27(2)}	^{7}	11	^{22(3)}	^{1}	11	^{36(5)}	^{7}	11	^{24(7)}	^{3}	↑			
(Angola)	Joca Palana	Osvaldo Jacob Chitumba Palana	24	FW	16	9																			5			
(Angola)	Jotabé Silva	João Baptista da Silva	27	GK	12	12	12	12	→																4			
(Senegal)	Ladji Keita	Ladji Keita	31	FW			20	20																	2			
(Angola)	Kelson	Euclides Moisés Fernando dos Santos	20	DF															→			5	^{1(1)}	^{0}	1			
(Angola)	Kembua	Nkembo Garcia	26	FW	4	4	4	→																	5			
(Angola)	Kizaca	Manuel Alexandre Domingos	20	GK									→			12	^{DNP}								1			
(Angola)	Lamá	Luís Maimona João	38	GK	1	1	1	1	1	1	^{DNP}		1	^{1}	^{0}	1	^{1}	^{0}	→						18			
(Democratic Republic of the Congo)	Lelo Mbele	Blaise Lelo Mbele	27	FW			28	31																	2			
(Angola)	Locó	Manuel Armindo Morais Cange	27	DF	5	→																			4			
(Angola)	Loló Cassule	Jorge Miguel Gonçalves Cassule	23	DF	2	2	2	→																	3			
(Angola)	Love Cabungula	Arsénio Sebastião Cabungula	33	FW	9	9																			2			
(Angola)	Lumeca	Sebastião Paulo Lumeca	17	DF			–																		1			
(Angola)	Mabiná	José Pedro Alberto	34	DF	21	21	21	21	21	21	^{9(5)}	^{1}	21	^{1(9)}	^{0}										12			
(Angola)	Mabululu Paciência	Agostinho Cristóvão Paciência	23	FW	32	32	18	18	18	→															6			
(Angola)	Malamba, Sidónio	Sidónio Malamba	32	FW	18																				5			
(Angola)	Maludi	Maludi Francisco Caxala	26	DF					26	4	^{DNP}		4	^{8(1)}	^{0}	4	^{8(3)}	^{1}	→						4			
(Angola)	Manguxi	Augusto António Domingos Quibeto	–	MF			→	28	10	10	^{21(1)}	^{1}	10	^{31(2)}	^{5}	10	^{6(4)}	^{0}	10	^{23(9)}	^{3}	10	^{6(10)}	^{2}	↑			
(Angola)	Mano José	Moisés Miguel José	23	MF	6	6	6	6																	5			
(Angola)	Mano Mano António	Constantino Carlos António	19	MF									→			28	^{DNP}		→						1			
(Angola)	Mateus Domingos	Mateus Gaspar Domingos	26	MF	33	14	14	14	14	14	^{4(14)}	^{1}	14	^{12(9)}	^{1}	14	^{9(9)}	^{1}	14	^{15(19)}	^{2}	→			10			
(Angola)	Mavambu	Mavambu João Afonso Baptista	20	MF					24	24	^{(4)}	^{0}	→												2			
(Angola)	Megue Miguel	Pedro Pessoa Miguel	–	MF															6	^{(4)}	^{0}	6	^{6(4)}	^{1}	↑			
(Ghana)	Mensah	Isaac Mensah	–	MF												→			17	^{2(7)}	^{0}	17	^{19(11)}	^{3}	↑			
(Angola)	Mig	Zacarias dos Milagres Sambambi	24	GK			35	→	12	12	^{DNP}		12	^{DNP}											4			
(Angola)	Miguel Quiame	Miguel Geraldo Quiame	25	DF	3	3	3		→	13	^{12}	^{0}	→												6			
(Angola)	Mira Macuenho	Daniel João Zongo Macuenho	28	DF	→	24	24	24	2	2	^{20}	^{0}	2	^{28(2)}	^{0}	2	^{20(1)}	^{0}	2	^{4}	^{0}	→			8			
(Ghana)	Musah	Musah Inusah	–	DF												→			4	^{7}	^{0}	4	^{25}	^{0}	↑			
(Angola)	Nandinho Mendes	Fernando Bumba Mendes	24	MF						→			17	^{9(13)}	^{1}	17	^{(8)}	^{1}	→						2			
(Angola)	Nari	Bráulio Adélio de Olim Diniz	33	MF		→	23	23	→							→			23	^{10(5)}	^{0}	23	^{6(3)}	^{0}	4			→
(Angola)	Nelson Antunes	Nelson Francisco Manuel Lobo Antunes	21	GK	22	22	22	→																	4			
(Angola)	Nuno Neto	Nuno Miguel de Menezes Neto	28	MF	19	→																			2			
(Angola)	Osório	Osório Smith de Freitas Carvalho	33	MF	→	5	5	5																	3			
(Angola)	Pedro Agostinho	Pedro Domingos Agostinho	19	MF						→			24	^{1(1)}	^{0}	24	^{4(6)}	^{0}	24	^{3(1)}	^{0}	→			3			
(Angola)	Picas Sengui	Hermenegildo Domingos Sengui	–	MF															→			2	^{17(5)}	^{1}	↑			
(Angola)	Renato Campos	Renato Baptista Campos	31	DF	13																				12			
(Brazil)	Rubinho	Rubenval Rodrigo da Rocha	29	MF						→			20	^{1}	^{0}										1			
(Angola)	Santana Carlos	José da Silva Santana Carlos	29	FW	20	20																			7			
(Angola)	Tó Carneiro	Augusto de Jesus Corte-Real Carneiro	–	DF												→			13	^{31}	^{0}	13	^{31}	^{0}	↑			
(Angola)	Tomé Alberto	Tomé Osvaldo Alberto	17	DF					25																1			
(Brazil)	Tony Ribeiro	António Rosa Ribeiro	–	FW						→			19	^{19(9)}	^{6}	19	^{16(11)}	^{8}	19	^{30(13)}	^{13}	19	^{28(1)}	^{18}	↑			
(Angola)	Tresor Sousa	Tresor Stanislau de Sousa	26	MF									→			23	^{14(8)}	^{0}	6	^{2(1)}	^{0}				2			
(Angola)	Vá	Vladimiro Edson António Félix	21	FW												→			28	^{26(1)}	^{9}	→			1			
(Angola)	Vado Kitenga	Osvaldo Pedro de Jesus Kitenga	22	DF			→	27	4																2			
(Angola)	Wilson Gaspar	Wilson Pinto Gaspar	–	DF				→	15	15	^{28}	^{2}	15	^{25(1)}	^{2}	15	^{24}	^{0}	15	^{36}	^{1}	15	^{31}	^{1}	↑			
(Angola)	Yamba Asha	Yamba Asha João	35	DF	15	→																			5			
(Angola)	Yano Nicolau	Adriano Belmiro Duarte Nicolau	–	FW															→			28	^{20(10)}	^{13}	↑			
Years					2011	2012	2013	2014	2015	2016			2017			2018			2018–19		59	2019-20		55				

== 2001–2010 ==
Atlético Petróleos de Luanda players 2001–2010

Nat	Nick	Name	A	P	D.C.	JRA	J.B.	A.C.	A.B.	D.C.	Bernardino Pedroto				↑
Nat	Nick	Name	A	P	2001	2002	2003	2004	2005	2006	2007	2008	2009	2010	
Nat	Nick	Name	A	P	1	3	2	4	3	2	3	1	1	4	
(Republic of the Congo)	Abó	Arthur Ngoulou-Yakali Bienven	30	MF			2003	18	2005						
(Democratic Republic of the Congo)	Adolfo	Mavinga Boto Mabana	25	FW		–									
(Angola)	Akwá	Fabrice Alcebiades Maieco	30	FW							–				
(Brazil)	Anderson Machado	Anderson Machado		FW							–				
(Angola)	Andia	Andia Molulu Mendes		MF		27									
(Angola)	Arsénio						2003								
(Angola)	Avelino Lopes	Avelino Lopes	30	FW	2001		2003	–							
(Angola)	Avex	Avelino Eduardo António Craque	–	MF									→	14	↑
(Jamaica)	Bennet	Teafore Bennett	24	FW								9	→		
(Angola)	Bernardo	Bernardo Mário Faustino Cariata	29	MF					20	20					
(Angola)	Betinho	Alberto Tavares Ferreira	25	FW	2001	7									
(Cameroon)	Bikima	Jean Vauclin Bikima	20	FW						–	→				
(Angola)	Bodunha	Mateus Manuel Agostinho	32	DF					2005	–					
(Angola)	Bondoso			MF						6					
(Brazil)	Braga	Ademar da Silva Braga Júnior	29	DF					28						
(Angola)	Buá	Luvumbo Lourenço Pedro	19	MF							–	→			
(Angola)	Careca	Nanizau Jacques António	21	FW									–	–	
(Angola)	Caricoco	Paulo José Rodrigues Campos		MF	2001	20	→								
(Angola)	Carlão	Carlos Chibena Jamba	25	DF							–		2	30	
(Angola)	Cassoma	António Hélder Miranda Cassoma	–	DF					2005	25	25	25	25	25	↑
(Zambia)	Chanda	Chanda Mwape	26	FW			2003	–							
(Angola)	Chara	Fernando Agostinho da Costa	–	MF		28	2003	–	8	8	8	8	8	8	↑
(Angola)	Chinguila	João Lourenço Cardoso de Carvalho	27	DF					2005						
(Angola)	Chinho	João dos Santos de Almeida	25	FW	2001	19			→	11	–	→			
(Brazil)	Cléber	Cléber Oliveira da Silva	21	MF						–					
(Angola)	Dany	Silas Daniel Satonho	–	MF									28	26	↑
(Angola)	David	David Dinis Magalhães	–	FW					27	27	27	27	27	27	↑
(Angola)	Day Day	Zaldivar Doval Augusto Cambinda	–	MF								–	30	28	↑
(Angola)	Delgado	Luís Manuel Ferreira Delgado	27	DF	2001	3	→			30					
(Angola)	Deodato				2001										
(Angola)	Dias Caires	Yahenda Joaquim Caires Fernandes	26	DF	2001	4	2003	4							
(Angola)	Didí	Carlos Viegas	27	DF	2001	18									
(Angola)	Dione	Diogo Serafim Pedro	22	MF		5									
(Angola)	Edson Cata	Edson Filipe Santana Cata	30	FW						28					
(Angola)	Elson	Elson de Sousa Augusto		MF			2003	–	→						
(Cameroon)	Etah	Michael Ntui Etah	–	DF							7	7	7	7	↑
(Zambia)	Felix Katongo	Felix Katongo	23	MF							–				
(Angola)	Flávio	Flávio da Silva Amado	26	FW	2001	11	2003	11	2005						
(Angola)	Gazeta	Augusto Maneco Victor	30	MF			2003	9	9	→					
(Angola)	Gilberto	Felisberto Sebastião da Graça Amaral	19	MF	2001										
(Angola)	Gui	Augusto Kamuena Sassa	25	MF	2001										
(Angola)	Hélder	Hélder Figueiredo da Silva Cabral	28	GK								–	→		
(Angola)	Hélder Vicente	Hélder de Jesus Serafim Vicente	35	DF					→	5	–	–		–	
(Cape Verde)	Humberto	Humberto Gomes do Rosário	34	FW						→	–	–	10		
(Angola)	Isaac	Boelua Lokuli	26	FW			2003								
(Angola)	Jaburú	Teófilo Salvador Avelino	25	FW	2001										
(Brazil)	Jailson	Jailson Diniz Farias	25	FW					2005						
(Angola)	Jamuana	Manuel Alexandre Jamuana	–	DF						–		17	17	17	↑
(Angola)	João Ricardo	João Ricardo P.B.S. Ferreira	37	GK							–	–			
(Angola)	Job	Ricardo Job Estévão	–	MF							→	11	11	11	↑
(Angola)	Joca	Osvaldo Jacob Chitumba Palana	–	FW								16	16	16	↑
(Angola)	Jonas †	Carlos Emanuel Romeu Lima	30	MF	2001	9	→								
(Angola)	Joni	Osvaldo Roque Gonçalves da Cruz	36	MF						9					
(Angola)	Kembua	Nkembo Garcia	–	FW							–	–	→		↑
(Angola)	Kivota	Rui Manuel Kivota Cata	33	GK							→	24	24	24	→
(Angola)	Lamá	Luís Maimona João	–	GK	2001	22	2003	1	1	1	1	1	1	1	↑
(Angola)	Lamick	Pedro Sola João	20	GK								–			
(Angola)	Lau	Gaspar Fortunato Sebastião	22	DF										2	
(Brazil)	Leandro	Leandro Coelho Cardoso	27	MF						–					
(Angola)	Lebo Lebo	António Lebo Lebo	30	DF						4	–	–			
(Angola)	Locó	Manuel Armindo Morais Cange	–	DF			→	–	→			→	5	5	↑
(Angola)	Lunguinha	António Luís dos Santos Serrado	21	DF						→	–				
(Angola)	Mabiná	José Pedro Alberto	–	DF					→	21	21	21	21	21	↑
(Angola)	Mabululu	Agostinho Cristóvão Paciência	–	FW										32	↑
(Angola)	Malamba	Sidónio Malamba	–	MF						→	18	18	18	18	↑
(Democratic Republic of the Congo)	Mandiangu	Mandiangu Kimpembe		MF		29	2003	6	→						
(Angola)	Maninho	António Pascoal Matias	30	DF	2001	–	→	→	2005	–	–	–			
(Angola)	Mano	Moisés Miguel José	–	MF									4	→	↑
(Angola)	Manucho Barros	João Hernâni Rosa Barros	20	FW						34					
(Angola)	Manucho Gonçalves	Mateus Alberto Contreiras Gonçalves	24	FW				–	19	19	–				
(Angola)	Manuel	Manuel Arlindo Sala	22	DF			2003	15							
(Angola)	Marito	Mário André Rodrigues João	29	GK	→	1	2003	–	2005	22					
(Democratic Republic of the Congo)	Massaro	Mabundu Makumona Phillippe		FW				→	2005	→					
(Angola)	Massinga	Moisés Armando Yango	22	FW									9	→	
(Angola)	Mateus	Mateus Gaspar Domingos	–	MF										33	↑
(Cape Verde)	Mateus	Mateus Henrique Fonseca Lopes	31	FW						18	→				
(Angola)	Maurito	Norberto Mauro da Costa Mulenessa	29	FW									10	10	
(Democratic Republic of the Congo)	Mbiyavanga	Mbiyavanga Kapela	30	MF	2001			26	26	26	→				
(Democratic Republic of the Congo)	Mbunga †	Alain Mbunga Mayo		FW	2001	23	2003	10							
(Brazil)	Michel	Ediwaldo Rodrigues Cunha	30	DF			2003	–		10					
(Angola)	Miguel	Miguel Geraldo Quiame	–	DF								–	29		↑
(Angola)	Milocas	António Fernandes dos Santos		DF			2003	–	2005	→					
(Angola)	Miro	Belmiro da Conceição Pereira	23	DF			→	–	14	14	→				
(Niger)	Moussa	Moussa Mohamed	25	FW									9	→	
(Zambia)	Mukota	Ignatius Mukota	25	FW				→	2005	→					
(Angola)	Nando	Fernando Morais	35	GK	2001										
(Angola)	Nato Faial	Pedro Renato Faial		FW		–		–	→						
(Angola)	Nelo I			DF			2003								
(Angola)	Nelo Arsénio	Emanuel Francisco Gonçalves Arsénio	35	MF			2003				→	6	6	6	
(Angola)	Nelson	Nelson Francisco Manuel Lobo Antunes	–	GK										22	↑
(Angola)	Nsuka	Domingos Celestino Sapato		DF					→	29					
(Angola)	Nuno Neto	Nuno Miguel de Menezes Neto	–	MF									→	19	↑
(Chad)	Omar Francis	Francis Oumar Belonga	27	FW					2005						
(Democratic Republic of the Congo)	Papy	Papy Lukata Shumu	32	GK								→	12	12	
(Angola)	Paulo Silva	Paulo Silva	32	MF			2003				–				
(Democratic Republic of the Congo)	Pitchú	Tubi Landu	25	GK		–	→	–	2005						
(Angola)	Renato	Renato Baptista Campos	–	DF	2001	13	2003		13	13	13	13	13	13	↑
(Democratic Republic of the Congo)	Riddy	Rudy Michel Etienne Liema Ebengo	25	FW									→	23	→
(Angola)	Roberto	Roberto Manuel Cardoso	17	DF					2005		→				
(Democratic Republic of the Congo)	Roger							–							
(Angola)	Rolf	Rolf Miller Pereira	21	FW							→	–	→		
(Brazil)	Rômulo	Rômulo Marques Macedo	27	FW					6		–				
(Angola)	Santana	José da Silva Carlos Santana	–	FW		30			→	15	–	23	→	20	↑
(Angola)	Sérgio	Sérgio António Matusimua	30	DF							→	3	3	3	
(Angola)	Stanick	Caetano Manuel Domingos		FW									19		
(Angola)	Stélvio	Stélvio Rosa da Cruz	21	MF										–	
(Angola)	Stiller			DF			2003	–							
(Zambia)	Tana	Elijah Tana	31	DF			2003	7	7	7					
(Angola)	Taty	Kimfuta Kuntima	26	FW				–							
(Angola)	Tony Osódio	António Osódio Pascoal Chilembo	30	MF			2003	–	24	→					
(Angola)	Tunga	Luís Simão Mateus	24	MF								20	20	→	
(Angola)	Vadinho	Hamlet Divalde Sousa Campos	22	DF						→	–	→			
(Portugal)	Victor Pereira	Vítor José Joaquim Pereira	29	MF							–	–			
(Angola)	Vilar	Modesto Feliciano		DF					2005						
(Kenya)	Wanga	Allan Wanga	24	FW							→	14	14	→	
(Angola)	Yamba Asha	Yamba Asha João	–	DF						→	15	15	15	15	↑
(Angola)	Zé Kalanga	Paulo Baptista Nsimba	23	MF			→	–	17	17					
(Angola)	Zico	Fernando Domingos Francisco	29	MF	2001	10									
Years					2001	2002	2003	2004	2005	2006	2007	2008	2009	2010	

== 1991–2000 ==
Atlético Petróleos de Luanda players 1991–2000

Nat	Nick	Name	A	P	C.Q.	Gojko Zec			Jesus		J.F.	J.F.	–	D.C.	↑
Nat	Nick	Name	A	P	1991	1992	1993	1994	1995	1996	1997	1998	1999	2000	
Nat	Nick	Name	A	P	–	–	1	1	1	–	–	–	4	1	
(Angola)	Amaral	Amaral Aleixo	32	FW		1992	1993	1994	1995	1996	1997				
(Angola)	André	André Miguel Ernesto	23	MF	1991										
(Angola)	Antoninho	António Daniel		MF		1992	1993								
(Angola)	Aurélio	Aurélio de Sousa Soares	25	DF			1993	1994	1995		1997		1999		
(Angola)	Avelino	Luís Avelino		MF	1991	1992	1993								
(Angola)	Avelino Lopes	Avelino Lopes	–	FW										2000	↑
(Angola)	Betinho	Alberto Tavares Ferreira	–	FW							1997	1998		2000	↑
(Angola)	Bodunha	Mateus Manuel Agostinho	–	DF		1992	1993	1994	1995	1996	1997	1998	1999		↑
(Angola)	Bravo da Rosa	Paulo Bravo da Rosa		DF		1992									
(Angola)	Cacharamba	Manuel Pascoal Cacharamba Júnior	25	MF						1996	1997	1998	1999	2000	
(Angola)	Caricoco	Paulo Campos	–	MF									→	2000	↑
(Angola)	Carlitos	Carlos Pio	28							1996					
(Angola)	Carlos Pedro	Carlos Pedro Pires de Melo	22	MF	1991										
(Angola)	César Caná	César João Muto	27	FW								1998	1999		
(Angola)	Chicangala	André Chicangala	17	FW		→	1993	→							
(Angola)	Chico Dinis	Hermenegildo António Fernandes Dinis	29	DF	1991	1992	1993	1994	1995	1996	1997		1999		
(Angola)	Chinho	João dos Santos de Almeida	–	FW										2000	↑
(Angola)	Clarindo	Clarindo Mateus	25	MF			1993	1994	1995						
(Angola)	Delgado	Luís Manuel Ferreira Delgado	–	DF							1997	1998			↑
(Angola)	Dias Caires	Yahenda Joaquim Caires Fernandes	–	DF										2000	↑
(Angola)	Didí	Carlos Viegas	–	DF									→	2000	↑
(Angola)	Felito	Félix João Pascoal	25	MF	1991	1992	1993	1994	1995						
(Angola)	Filipe	Filipe Ehumbi Muhepa	26	DF								1998		2000	
(Angola)	Flávio	Flávio da Silva Amado	–	FW										2000	↑
(Angola)	Futre	Paulo Futre	18					1994							
(Angola)	Gilberto	Felisberto Sebastião da Graça Amaral	–	MF								1998	1999	2000	↑
(Angola)	Guedes	José Manuel de Sousa Guedes	27	FW						1996	1997	1998	1999	2000	
(Angola)	Gui	Augusto Kamuena Sassa	–	MF						1996	1997	1998	1999	2000	↑
(Angola)	Hélder	Hélder Mário Pedroso Teixeira	25	GK			1993								
(Angola)	Jaburú †	José Carlos dos Santos Avelino	25	FW			1993								↑
(Angola)	Jesus	Osvaldo Saturnino de Oliveira	35	MF	1991										
(Angola)	Joãozinho										1997				
(Angola)	Jonas †	Carlos Emanuel Romeu Lima	–	MF						1996	1997	1998	1999	2000	↑
(Democratic Republic of the Congo)	Kabongó								1995						
(Angola)	Langa	Alfredo da Costa Batila Manuel	23								1997				
(Democratic Republic of the Congo)	Libengué	Otis Monga Libengue	26	MF				1994	1995						
(Angola)	Lúcio	Mateus Lúcio Lopes Joaquim	31	GK	1991	1992	1993								
(Angola)	Luís Bento	Luís da Cruz Bento	30	DF					1995						
(Angola)	Luisinho	Luís Domingos António Cazengue	23	FW	1991	1992									
(Angola)	Mané	Mateus António Vieira Dias Neto	30	DF	1991	1992									
(Angola)	Maninho	António Pascoal Matias	–	DF						1996	1997	1998	1999		↑
(Angola)	Marito	Mário André Rodrigues João	–	GK			1993	1994	1995	1996	1997	1998	1999		↑
(Angola)	Mbala	Mbala José	28	GK							1997	1998			
(Democratic Republic of the Congo)	Mbiyavanga	Mbiyavanga Kapela	–	MF								1998		2000	↑
(Angola)	Minhas	Manuel Rocha dos Santos Dias	27	MF						1996	1997	1998			
(Angola)	Mona	Mikayela Diakananwa		FW	1991										
(Angola)	Nando	Fernando Morais	–	GK										2000	↑
(Angola)	Ndunguidi	Ndunguidi Gonçalves Daniel	35	MF	1991										
(Angola)	Nejó	Jaime Sousa e Silva	28	DF	1991	1992	1993								
(Angola)	Nelo Amaral										1997				
(Angola)	Nelo Bumba	Manuel Domingos Bumba	27	FW		1992	1993	1994	1995	1996	1997	1998			
(Angola)	Nsuka	Domingos Celestino Sapato	–	DF										2000	↑
(Angola)	Oliveira	Guilherme Armando Neto	23	DF		1992	1993	1994	1995						
(Angola)	Orlando			GK	1991	1992									
(Angola)	Papin									1996					
(Angola)	Patrick						1993								
(Angola)	Paulino	Paulino Alfredo						1994							
(Angola)	Paulito †	Paulo Miguel Gaspar da Silva	30	FW	1991	1992	1993	1994	1995		→	1998			
(Angola)	Paulo Dias	Paulo dos Santos Dias									1997	1998			
(Angola)	Paulo Silva	Paulo Jorge da Silva	21				1993	1994	1995	1996	1997				
(Angola)	Paulo Tomás	José Paulo Tomás	31	DF									1999		
(Angola)	Quim Sebas	Joaquim Sebastião Caetano	27	DF	1991	1992									
(Angola)	Rabolê	Hélder António Rabolé		DF							1997				
(Angola)	Ralph	Celestino Ralph Fernandes				1992	1993								
(Angola)	Rasgado	Feliciano Boavida Rasgado	28	DF		1992									
(Angola)	Renato	Renato Baptista Campos	–	DF										2000	↑
(Angola)	Rosário	António do Rosário Machado de Lemos	27	MF		1992	1993	1994							
(Angola)	Saúl						1993								
(Angola)	Serginho	Sérgio Simões	29						1995						
(Angola)	Sotha											1998			
(Angola)	Valente	António Domingos Valente	24	MF			1993								
(Angola)	Velho		25	DF				1994							
(Angola)	William													2000	
(Angola)	Willy			DF		1992	1993		1995	1996					
(Angola)	Wilson †	Wilson Paulino Botelho de Vasconcelos	30	MF	1991										
(Angola)	Zacarias	Zacarias Muamba	29	MF	1991	1992	1993	1994	1995	1996					
(Angola)	Zezinho	José Salvador Moreira	24	DF						1996					
(Angola)	Zico	Fernando Domingos Francisco	–	MF			1993	1994	1995	1996	1997	1998	1999	2000	↑

== 1981–1990 ==
Atlético Petróleos de Luanda players 1981–1990

Nat	Nick	Name	A	P	V.M.	Antônio Clemente			S.C.	A.A.	C.S.	A. Clemente		C. Queirós		↑
Nat	Nick	Name	A	P	1980	1981	1982	1983	1984	1985	1986	1987	1988	1989	1990	
Nat	Nick	Name	A	P	–	–	1	–	1	–	1	1	1	1	1	
(Angola)	Abel Campos	Afonso Abel de Campos	26	FW			1982	1983	1984	1985	1986	1987	1988			
(Angola)	Abreu	Gaspar de Abreu Neto		FW		1981										
(Angola)	Adinho	Eduardo Francisco Paulo	21										1988	1989		
(Angola)	Afonsinho									1985						
(Angola)	Afonso	Afonso Joaquim		MF		1981	1982	1983								
(Angola)	André	André Miguel Ernesto	–	FW											1990	↑
(Angola)	Antoninho	António Daniel	–	MF					1984	1985	1986	1987	1988			↑
(Angola)	Armindo	Armindo dos Santos								1985	1986					
(Angola)	Augusto								1984	1985						
(Angola)	Avelino	Luís Avelino	–	MF		1981	1982	1983	1984	1985	1986	1987	1988		1990	↑
(Cape Verde)	Balalau	João Barbosa									1986	1987	1988			
(Angola)	Bavi	Jorge Barros Vinhas		FW						1985						
(Angola)	Bodú	Manoka Boudouin Mendoza		DF			1982	1983	1984	1985						
(Angola)	Bolingó	José Salvador		MF										1989	1990	
(Angola)	Carlos			GK					1984	1985						
(Angola)	Carlos Pedro	Carlos Pedro Pires de Melo	–	MF										1989	1990	↑
(Angola)	César			FW		1981										
(Angola)	Chico Afonso	Francisco Afonso		DF		1981	1982	1983	1984	1985	1986	1987				
(Angola)	Cuba			DF		1981										
(Angola)	Da Silva									1985						
(Angola)	Dé									1985						
(Angola)	Dedé	Alexandre Gomes Neto		MF	1980	1981										
(Angola)	Delfim			FW	1980											
(Angola)	Dico	Kimpende Dico		MF			1982	1983								
(Angola)	Duídi			FW											1990	
(Angola)	Eduardo Machado	Eduardo Rosa Sousa Machado	26	MF		→	1982	→								
(Angola)	Esquerdinho			FW											1990	
(Angola)	Felito	Félix João Pascoal	–	MF										1989	1990	↑
(Angola)	Franco †	João Manuel da Silva	29	DF	1980	1981	1982	1983	1984							
(Angola)	Gaspar			MF		1981										
(Angola)	Gomes														1990	
(Angola)	Haia †	Buengo Landu Jakson		FW			1982	1983	1984	1985	1986					
(Angola)	Humberto	Humberto Neto		FW	1980	1981										
(Angola)	Janguelito	Joãozito João Imanga		DF										1989	1990	
(Angola)	Jesus	Osvaldo Saturnino de Oliveira	–	FW	1980	1981	1982	1983	1984	1985	1986	1987	1988			↑
(Angola)	João Machado	João Rosa de Sousa Machado	30	FW	→	1981										
(Angola)	Kuba	António Kuba	28	GK		→	1982	1983								
(Angola)	Laika †	Jerónimo António da Costa	19	FW			1982	1983	1984							
(Angola)	Lisboa			GK					1984							
(Angola)	Lito	Paulo Gouveia Júnior		FW		1981	1982	1983	1984	1985						
(Angola)	Lúcio	Mateus Lúcio Lopes Joaquim	–	GK							→	1987	1988	1989	1990	↑
(Angola)	Lufemba	Ghislão Lufemba Luke	23	MF			1982	1983	1984							
(Angola)	Luisinho	Luís Domingos António Cazengue	–	FW									1988	1989	1990	↑
(Angola)	Macuéria †	Almeida Adelino Felix Macuéria	28	DF	1980	1981	1982	1983	1984	1985	1986					
(Angola)	Melanchton	João Manuel de Jesus Melanchton		DF	1980	1981										
(Angola)	Meco †	Américo dos Santos	23	MF	1980	1981										
(Angola)	Messo	Feliciano Dias Messo	25		1980	1981										
(Angola)	Mobezo			MF					1984							
(Angola)	Mona	Mikayela Diakananwa	–	FW										1989	1990	↑
(Angola)	Moreno			DF	1980	1981	1982	1983								
(Angola)	Nandinho	Fernando Teixeira	17	DF	1980	1981				1985	1986					
(Angola)	Nando							1983								
(Angola)	Ndongala	Ndongala José Garcia Mpassi										1987	1988			
(Angola)	Ndunguidi	Ndunguidi Gonçalves Daniel	–	MF											1990	↑
(Angola)	Nejó	Jaime Sousa e Silva	–	DF					1984	1985	1986	1987	1988	1989	1990	↑
(Angola)	Nelo Bumba	Manuel Domingos Bumba	–	FW											1990	↑
(Angola)	Neto			MF		1981										
(Angola)	Nhanga	Ernesto Francisco Guedes Kanhanga	20											→	1990	
(Angola)	Norberto													1989		
(Angola)	Nsumbo	Nsumbo Manuel		DF			1982	1983	1984	1985	1986					
(Angola)	Oliveira	Francisco Teixeira de Oliveira		FW		1981										
(Angola)	Orlando		–	GK											1990	↑
(Angola)	Ofualuka	André Ofualuka		FW							1986					
(Angola)	Panzo †	Adriano Panzo		GK	1980	1981		1983	1984	1985	1986					
(Angola)	Paulão	Paulo Alexandre Amorim Baptista	21	MF						1985	1986	1987	1988	1989	1990	
(Angola)	Paulito †	Paulo Miguel Gaspar da Silva	–	FW										1989	1990	↑
(Angola)	Pedro Ferro	Pedro Domingos Lopes		DF					1984	1985	1986					
(Angola)	Pepé	José Baltazar da Cruz		MF		1981	1982	1983								
(Angola)	Pinto														1990	
(Angola)	Porto	Armindo Paulo Francisco	23	DF			1982	1983			1986					
(Angola)	Quim			DF						1985	1986					
(Angola)	Quim Sebas	Joaquim Sebastião Caetano	–	DF								1987	1988	1989	1990	↑
(Angola)	Ralph	Celestino Ralph Fernandes	–	DF										1989	1990	↑
(Angola)	Rasgado	Feliciano Boavida Rasgado	–	MF						1985	1986	1987	1988	1989	1990	↑
(Angola)	Rui Gomes	Rui Gomes		DF		→	1982			1985						
(Angola)	Saavedra	Manuel Martins Saavedra	26							→	1986	1987	1988			
(Angola)	Santo António	Domingos José Diogo	31	DF			→	1983	1984	1985	1986	1987				
(Angola)	Santos			MF	1980	1981										
(Angola)	Serginho	Sérgio Simões	–							1985						
(Angola)	Silva			DF		1981										
(Angola)	Simão	Simão Paulo	22	GK							1986					
(Angola)	Teixeira	Francisco Teixeira de Oliveira		DF	1980	1981										
(Angola)	Toko	Toko Nkano				1981	→									
(Angola)	Tomassita							1983								
(Angola)	Tonel						1982									
(Angola)	Tozé	António José de Sousa	23	GK		1981	1982	1983	1984	1985	1986					
(Angola)	Valentim			MF											1990	
(Angola)	Vieira Dias	Gabriel Vieira Dias	23	MF	1980	→										
(Angola)	Wilson †	Wilson Paulino Botelho de Vasconcelos	–	DF					1984	1985	1986	1987	1988	1989	1990	↑
(Angola)	Zé Luís	José Luís Pereira	28	DF						1985						

== See also ==
- Category:Atlético Petróleos de Luanda players
