= Gerson Barros =

Angolan footballer (born 1987)

Personal information
- Full name: Gerson Bruno da Costa Barros
- Date of birth: 1 April 1987 (age 39)
- Height: 1.93 m (6 ft 4 in)
- Position: Goalkeeper

Team information
- Current team: Petro Atlético
- Number: 22

Youth career
- 1998–2003: Moitense
- 2003–2006: Barreirense

Senior career*
| Years | Team | Apps | (Gls) |
| 2005–2006 | Barreirense | 0 | (0) |
| 2006–2010 | Fabril | 26 | (0) |
| 2011–2013 | Santos Angola | 24 | (0) |
| 2014– | Petro Atlético | 98 | (0) |

International career^{‡}
| 2017– | Angola | 10 | (0) |
- * Club domestic league appearances and goals as of 11:44, 14 June 2019 (UTC) ‡ National team caps and goals as of 11:44, 23 September 2018 (UTC)

Gerson Bruno da Costa Barros (born 1 April 1987), commonly known as Gerson Barros, is an Angolan footballer who currently plays as a goalkeeper for Petro Atlético.

== Career statistics ==
=== Club ===
As of 14 June 2019.

| Club | Season | League | | | Cup | | Continental | | Other | | Total | |
| Club | Season | Division | Apps | Goals | Apps | Goals | Apps | Goals | Apps | Goals | Apps | Goals |
|---|---|---|---|---|---|---|---|---|---|---|---|---|
| Fabril | 2006–07 | Setúbal FA First Division | 18 | 0 | 0 | 0 | – | | 0 | 0 | 18 | 0 |
| Fabril | 2008–09 | Terceira Divisão | 4 | 0 | 0 | 0 | – | | 0 | 0 | 4 | 0 |
| Fabril | 2009–10 | Terceira Divisão | 4 | 0 | 0 | 0 | – | | 0 | 0 | 4 | 0 |
| Fabril | Total | | 26 | 0 | 0 | 0 | 0 | 0 | 0 | 0 | 26 | 0 |
| Santos Angola | 2012 | Girabola | 11 | 0 | 0 | 0 | – | | 0 | 0 | 11 | 0 |
| Santos Angola | 2013 | Girabola | 13 | 0 | 0 | 0 | – | | 0 | 0 | 13 | 0 |
| Santos Angola | Total | | 24 | 0 | 0 | 0 | 0 | 0 | 0 | 0 | 24 | 0 |
| Petro Atlético | 2014 | Girabola | 0 | 0 | 0 | 0 | – | | 0 | 0 | 0 | 0 |
| Petro Atlético | 2015 | Girabola | 15 | 0 | 0 | 0 | – | | 0 | 0 | 15 | 0 |
| Petro Atlético | 2016 | Girabola | 28 | 0 | 2 (Note: Appearances in the Taça de Angola) | 0 | – | | 0 | 0 | 30 | 0 |
| Petro Atlético | 2017 | Girabola | 29 | 0 | 5 | 0 | – | | 0 | 0 | 34 | 0 |
| Petro Atlético | 2018 | Girabola | 26 | 0 | 0 | 0 | 4 (Note: Appearances in the CAF Confederation Cup) | 0 | 0 | 0 | 30 | 0 |
| Petro Atlético | 2018–19 | Girabola | 13 | 0 | 0 | 0 | 7 | 0 | 0 | 0 | 20 | 0 |
| Petro Atlético | Total | | 111 | 0 | 7 | 0 | 11 | 0 | 0 | 0 | 129 | 0 |
| Career total | | | 161 | 0 | 7 | 0 | 11 | 0 | 0 | 0 | 179 | 0 |

=== International ===
As of matches played 23 September 2018.

| National team | Year | Apps | Goals |
|---|---|---|---|
| Angola | 2017 | 7 | 0 |
| Angola | 2018 | 3 | 0 |
| Total | | 10 | 0 |
