= Diney (footballer, born 1991) =

Brazilian footballer

Personal information
- Full name: Valdisney Costa dos Santos
- Date of birth: March 2, 1991 (age 35)
- Place of birth: Taguatinga, Federal District, Brazil
- Height: 1.79 m (5 ft 10 in)
- Position: Midfielder

Youth career
- Atlético Mineiro

Senior career*
| Years | Team | Apps | (Gls) |
| 2010–2014 | Atlético Mineiro | 0 | (0) |
| 2012 | → Ipatinga (loan) | 0 | (0) |
| 2013 | → Rio Verde (loan) | 0 | (0) |
| 2014 | Caldense | 0 | (0) |
| 2014–2015 | América | 9 | (1) |
| 2015 | Caldense | 8 | (1) |
| 2016 | Piracicaba | 0 | (0) |
| 2017–2018 | Petro de Luanda | 29 | (2) |
- * Club domestic league appearances and goals as of 2 September 2018

Valdisney Costa dos Santos (born 2 March 1991), commonly known as Diney, is a footballer who plays as a midfielder, he is currently a free agent.

== Career ==
Diney started off with the Atlético Mineiro U20s before moving up to the first-team, he remained in the first-team squad for four years between 2010 and 2014 but he played just twice for the club; both appearances coming in the 2010 Copa Sudamericana against Independiente Santa Fe. During his time with Atlético Mineiro he was loaned out by the club on two occasions, firstly to Ipatinga in 2012 and then to Rio Verde in 2013. He made two appearances for Ipatinga in the 2012 Copa do Brasil and five appearances for Rio Verde in the 2013 Campeonato Goiano a year later. 2014 began with Diney departing Atlético Mineiro to join Caldense, he made 10 appearances in the 2014 Campeonato Mineiro with the club and scored goals against Nacional and Tombense.

After the 2014 Campeonato Mineiro, Diney agreed to join América ahead of the Série B season. In the aforementioned league he made nine appearances and scored one goal which came in his penultimate match of the season. Diney played matches for América in the 2015 Campeonato Mineiro before leaving to rejoin Caldense, he scored one goal in eight appearances in Série D before exiting. In 2016, Diney joined Piracicaba. After participating in seven Campeonato Paulista matches he was released on 12 April.

In the midseason of 2017, he signed with Petro de Luanda, where he played until 2018.

== Career statistics ==
As of 28 April 2016.

| Club | Season | League | | Cup (Note: Includes the Copa do Brasil) | | Continental (Note: Includes the Copa Sudamericana) | | Other (Note: Includes the Campeonato Goiano, Campeonato Mineiro and Campeonato Paulista) | | Total | |
| Club | Season | Apps | Goals | Apps | Goals | Apps | Goals | Apps | Goals | Apps | Goals |
|---|---|---|---|---|---|---|---|---|---|---|---|
| Atlético Mineiro | 2010 | 0 | 0 | 0 | 0 | 2 (Note: 2 appearances in 2010 Copa Sudamericana) | 0 | 0 | 0 | 2 | 0 |
| Atlético Mineiro | Total | 0 | 0 | 0 | 0 | 2 | 0 | 0 | 0 | 2 | 0 |
| Ipatinga (loan) | 2012 | 0 | 0 | 2 (Note: 2 appearances in 2012 Copa do Brasil) | 0 | — | | 0 | 0 | 2 | 0 |
| Ipatinga (loan) | Total | 0 | 0 | 2 | 0 | — | | 0 | 0 | 2 | 0 |
| Rio Verde (loan) | 2013 | 0 | 0 | 0 | 0 | — | | 5 (Note: 5 appearances in 2013 Campeonato Goiano) | 0 | 5 | 0 |
| Rio Verde (loan) | Total | 0 | 0 | 0 | 0 | — | | 5 | 0 | 5 | 0 |
| Caldense | 2014 | 0 | 0 | 0 | 0 | — | | 10 (Note: 10 appearances in 2014 Campeonato Mineiro) | 2 | 10 | 2 |
| Caldense | Total | 0 | 0 | 0 | 0 | — | | 10 | 2 | 10 | 2 |
| América | 2014 | 9 | 1 | 0 | 0 | — | | 0 | 0 | 9 | 1 |
| América | 2015 | 0 | 0 | 0 | 0 | — | | 3 (Note: 3 appearances in 2015 Campeonato Mineiro) | 0 | 3 | 0 |
| América | Total | 9 | 1 | 0 | 0 | — | | 3 | 0 | 12 | 1 |
| Caldense | 2015 | 8 | 1 | 0 | 0 | — | | 0 | 0 | 8 | 1 |
| Caldense | Total | 8 | 1 | 0 | 0 | — | | 0 | 0 | 8 | 1 |
| Piracicaba | 2016 | 0 | 0 | 0 | 0 | — | | 7 (Note: 7 appearances in 2016 Campeonato Paulista) | 0 | 7 | 0 |
| Piracicaba | Total | 0 | 0 | 0 | 0 | — | | 7 | 0 | 7 | 0 |
| Total | | 17 | 2 | 2 | 0 | 2 | 0 | 25 | 2 | 46 | 4 |
