= Wilson Gaspar =

Portuguese-Angolan footballer

Personal information
- Full name: Wilson Pinto Gaspar
- Date of birth: 29 September 1990 (age 36)
- Place of birth: Porto, Portugal
- Height: 1.73 m (5 ft 8 in)
- Position: Centre-back

Team information
- Current team: Petro de Luanda
- Number: 15

Senior career*
Years	Team	Apps	(Gls)
2009–2010	Candal	22	(1)
2010–2011	Ribeirão	12	(0)
2011–2012	Lousada	30	(2)
2012–2013	Vizela	25	(1)
2014	Kabuscorp	11	(0)
2015–	Petro de Luanda	128	(4)

International career^{‡}
2017–	Angola	19	(1)
- * Club domestic league appearances and goals as of 1 August 2020 ‡ National team caps and goals as of 6 October 2019

Wilson Pinto Gaspar (born 29 September 1990) is a Portuguese-born Angolan footballer who plays as a centre-back for Petro de Luanda and the Angola national team.

== International career ==
Gaspar made his senior international debut on 29 June 2017 in a COSAFA Cup draw against Malawi.

== Career statistics ==
Scores and results list Angola's goal tally first.

No	Date	Venue	Opponent	Score	Result	Competition
1.	6 September 2019	Independence Stadium, Bakau, Gambia	Gambia	1–0	1–0	2022 FIFA World Cup qualification
