= Duarte Duarte =

Portuguese footballer (born 1987)

Personal information
- Full name: Duarte Jorge Gomes Duarte
- Date of birth: 27 August 1987 (age 39)
- Place of birth: Vila Verde, Portugal
- Height: 1.76 m (5 ft 9 1/2 in)
- Position: Attacking midfielder

Youth career
- 2002–2006: Vilaverdense

Senior career*
Years	Team	Apps	(Gls)
2006–2009	Vilaverdense	35	(5)
2009–2011	Gil Vicente	16	(0)
2011–2012	Varzim	33	(11)
2012–2013	Benfica B	10	(0)
2013	→ Paços Ferreira (loan)	0	(0)
2013–2015	Paços Ferreira	1	(0)
2014	→ Oliveirense (loan)	6	(0)
2015–2016	Petro de Luanda	30	(0)
2017–2018	Interclube	9	(4)
2018–2019	Trofense	30	(6)
2019–2020	Felgueiras 1932	10	(2)
2020–2021	Espinho	9	(0)
2021	Vilaverdense	11	(4)
2021–2024	Oliveirense	82	(13)
2024–2025	Trofense	26	(1)
2025–2026	Marco 09	23	(0)
- * Club domestic league appearances and goals as of 7 May 2026

Duarte Jorge Gomes Duarte (born 27 August 1987), simply known as Duarte Duarte, is a Portuguese professional footballer who plays as an attacking midfielder.

== Club career ==
Born in Vila Verde, Duarte spent 4 seasons at the youth academy of local club Vilaverdense with whom he made his professional debut. He made 13 appearances in his first season without scoring any goal. In 2009, he was transferred to Segunda Liga side Gil Vicente. After failing to play in any match in his second season, he joined Varzim. Here he was a hit, scoring 11 goals in 33 appearances.

In June 2012, he signed for Benfica B on a four-year contract for €250,000. However, he struggled in his new club. Duarte managed to make only 10 appearances among whom there were 6 starts. So, in January 2013, he was sold off to Paços Ferreira on a three-and-a-half-year contract.

Upon joining Pacos, he was immediately loaned out to Segunda Liga club Oliveirense till the end of the 2013–2014 season.
