= Mabiná =

Angolan footballer (born 1987)

Personal information
- Full name: José Pedro Alberto
- Date of birth: October 6, 1987 (age 39)
- Place of birth: Luanda, Angola
- Height: 1.78 m (5 ft 10 in)
- Position: Midfielder

Senior career*
Years	Team	Apps	(Gls)
2006–	Petro Atlético	?	(?)

International career^{‡}
2009–	Angola	6	(0)
- * Club domestic league appearances and goals as of 28 January 2008 ‡ National team caps and goals as of 14 January 2010

José Pedro Alberto (born August 2, 1987, in Luanda), better known as Mabiná, is an Angolan retired football midfielder.

== Career ==
Mabiná has played for Atlético Petróleos Luanda since the start of the 2006 Girabola season, although he was in their youth team for a number of years. In 2007, he was called up to the Angola football team for the first team. He won his first cap in late 2007, but was not called up again until 2008 where he participated in the 2010 FIFA World Cup qualification, which were unsuccessful.

He was called up to the 2010 African Nations Cup squad, and played in the first game of the tournament against Mali, which ended 4-4. He gave a sterling performance, and is set to challenge Locó for the regular right-back spot.
