= Fabrício Simões =

Brazilian footballer (born 1984)

Personal information
- Full name: Fabrício Santos Simões
- Date of birth: 26 December 1984 (age 41)
- Place of birth: Cachoeiro de Itapemirim, Brazil
- Height: 1.83 m (6 ft 0 in)
- Position: Forward

Team information
- Current team: B-SAD
- Number: 84

Senior career*
Years	Team	Apps	(Gls)
2004	Unitri		
2005	Estrela do Norte		
2006	Penapolense		
2006–2007	Câmara Lobos		
2007–2008	Machico	29	(5)
2009–2010	Benfica Castelo Branco	30	(21)
2010–2011	Operário	16	(13)
2011–2012	União Leiria	12	(1)
2011–2012	→ Estoril (loan)	22	(5)
2012–2013	Covilhã	39	(10)
2013	Caála		
2015	Benfica de Luanda		
2016	Petro de Luanda	10	(5)
2017	Recreativo Libolo	27	(10)
2017–2018	Alki Oroklini	31	(20)
2018–2019	Famalicão	34	(16)
2019–2020	Farense	24	(4)
2020–2021	Feirense	33	(10)
2021–2022	Estrela Amadora	19	(2)
2023–	B-SAD	13	(1)
- * Club domestic league appearances and goals as of 24 June 2023

Fabrício Santos Simões (born 26 December 1984) is a Brazilian professional footballer who plays as a forward for Portuguese club B-SAD.

He spent most of his career in Portugal, playing in the Primeira Liga for União Leiria, and in the second tier for seven clubs, achieving totals of 185 games and 47 goals in the latter competition. He was its top scorer in 2018–19, with 16 goals for Famalicão. He also played in Angola and Cyprus, scoring 20 times in his one year at Alki Oroklini.

== Career ==
=== Early years ===
After several spells with lower league Brazilian clubs, Fabrício moved to Portugal in 2006 with Madeiran club C.S.D. Câmara de Lobos where he remained for one season. The following few seasons saw him move frequently through several amateur clubs in the country, including A.D. Machico, Sport Benfica e Castelo Branco and CD Operário.

In January 2011, after a successful first half of the season with Operário where he scored 16 goals in 19 games, Fabrício moved to Primeira Liga side U.D. Leiria on a contract lasting until 2014. He debuted for his new club on 6 February in an away league fixture against S.C. Olhanense, and following week he scored in a 1–0 victory over C.D. Nacional.

In the summer of 2011, after failing to establish himself at Leiria, Fabrício joined G.D. Estoril Praia on a season-long loan. His season with Estoril saw him make 32 appearances in which he contributed six goals to help his side gain promotion to the top flight of Portuguese football. Despite his contribution towards Estoril's promotion, the Canarinhos decided not to purchase the player on a permanent basis and returned him to União de Leiria, who terminated his contract and granted his release in May 2012.

Weeks after his release from Leiria, Fabrício signed for Segunda Liga side S.C. Covilhã on a free transfer. He made his official debut for his new side on 28 July in a Taça da Liga fixture against F.C. Arouca where he scored a hat-trick in a 4–2 win. His stay with the Leões da Serra ended with 16 goals in 46 appearances.

=== Angola and Cyprus ===
On 29 June, Fabrício left for Angolan side Recreativo da Caála.

Following more experience in the African country with S.L. Benfica (Luanda), Atlético Petróleos de Luanda and C.R.D. Libolo, Fabrício came back to Europe in August 2017 when he joined Alki Oroklini of the Cypriot First Division. He scored 20 times in his only season, including a hat-trick on 30 January in a 4–3 home loss to Ermis Aradippou FC; this tally put him third in the league's goalscorers, behind Matt Derbyshire and Florian Taulemesse.

=== Return to Portugal ===
In May 2018, Fabrício came back to Portugal's second tier, joining F.C. Famalicão on a one-year deal with the option of a second. He scored 16 times in his one season in Vila Nova de Famalicão, putting him joint with F.C. Penafiel's Jorge Pires as the division's top scorer while his team returned to the top flight for the first time in a quarter of a century. In the summer of 2019, he stayed in the second tier, joining S.C. Farense on the same contract as before, and after a second successive promotion he made his way to C.D. Feirense on 5 July 2020.

Remaining in the same league, Fabrício signed for C.F. Estrela da Amadora on 23 June 2021. He left a year later, and returned to the same division at B-SAD on 31 January 2023; he scored once in 13 games as the team suffered relegation, opening a 1–1 home draw with Académico de Viseu F.C. on 15 April.
