= Miguel Quiame =

Angolan footballer (born 1991)

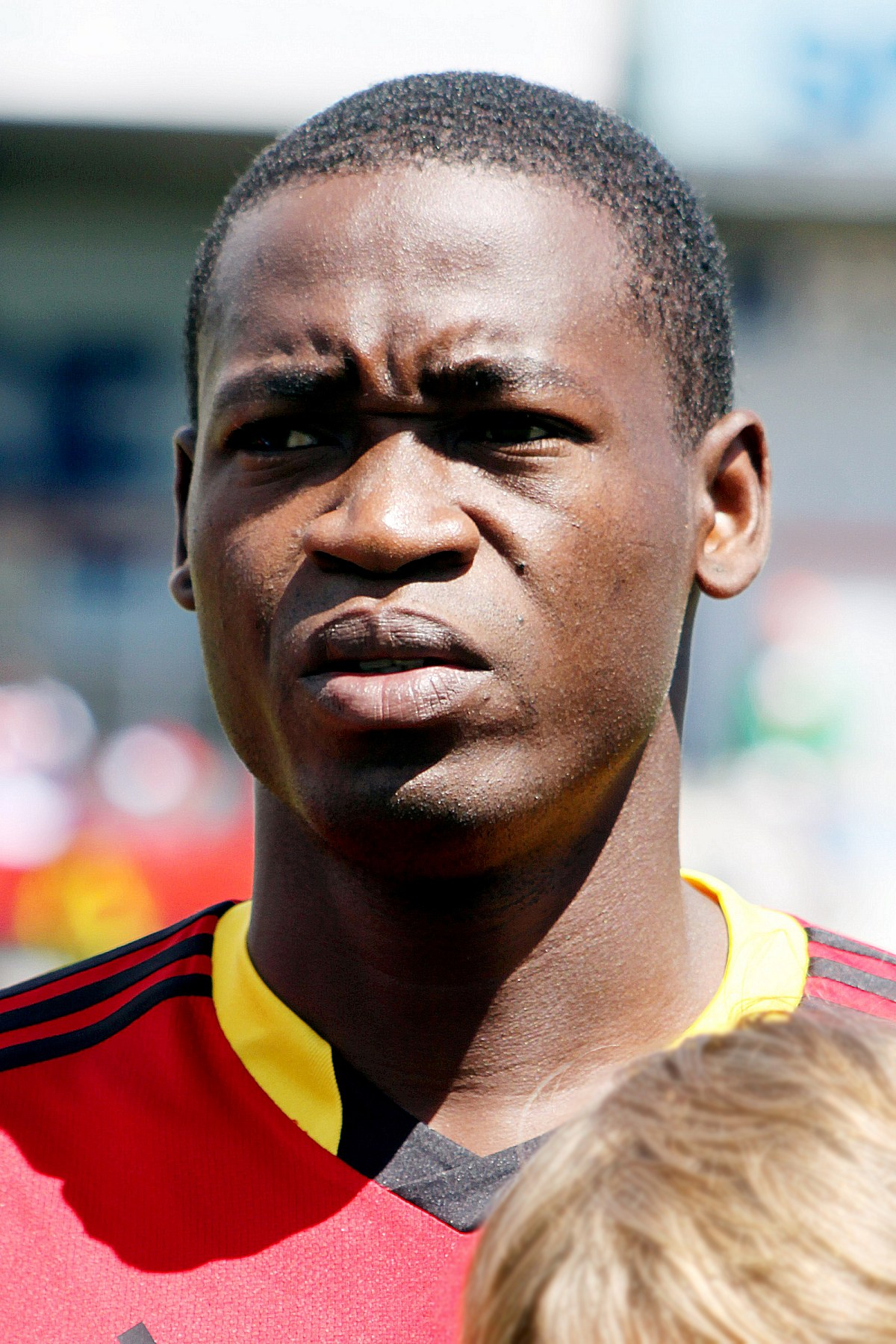
- Quiame in 2014

Personal information
- Date of birth: 17 September 1991 (age 35)
- Place of birth: Luanda, Angola
- Height: 1.78 m (5 ft 10 in)
- Position: Left back

Team information
- Current team: AD Mação

Senior career*
Years	Team	Apps	(Gls)
2009–2010	Académica Soyo		
2011–2013	Petro Atlético		
2013–2014	AEL Limassol	1	(0)
2014–2016	Benfica Luanda	27	(0)
2016	Petro Atlético	12	(0)
2017	Inter de Luanda	6	(0)
2018	Recreativo do Libolo	7	(0)
2018	Progresso	2	(0)
2019–	AD Mação	8	(0)

International career^{‡}
2010–	Angola	28	(0)
Medal record
Men's football
Representing Angola
African Nations Championship
Runner-up	2011 Sudan
- * Club domestic league appearances and goals as of 12:56, 19 April 2019 (UTC) ‡ National team caps and goals as of 16:07, 19 March 2018 (UTC)

Miguel Quiame (born 17 September 1991) is an Angolan international footballer who plays professionally as a left back for AD Mação in Portugal.

== Career ==
Born in Luanda, Quiame has played club football for Académica Soyo, Petro Atlético, AEL Limassol, Benfica Luanda, Inter de Luanda and Recreativo do Libolo.

He made his international debut for Angola in 2010, and he has appeared in FIFA World Cup qualifying matches for them.

== Honours ==
Angola

- African Nations Championship: runner-up 2011
