= Chara (footballer) =

Angolan footballer (born 1981)

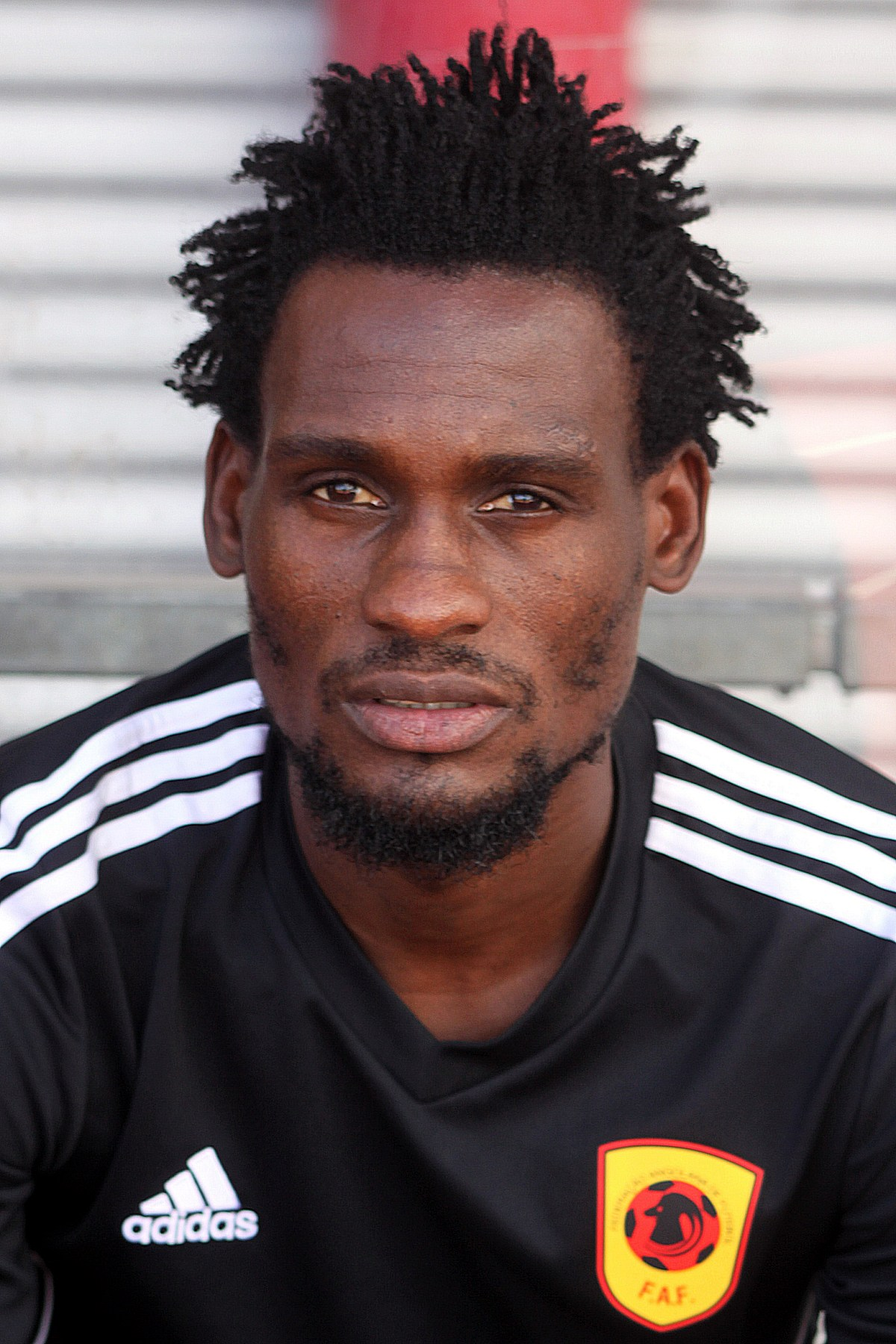

Personal information
- Full name: Fernando Agostinho da Costa
- Date of birth: October 10, 1981 (age 45)
- Place of birth: Luanda, Angola
- Height: 1.80 m (5 ft 11 in)
- Position: Midfielder

Team information
- Current team: Recreativo do Libolo
- Number: 4

Senior career*
Years	Team	Apps	(Gls)
2002–2016	Petro Atlético	?	(?)
2017–	Rec do Libolo	11	(0)

International career^{‡}
2003–2014	Angola	44	(0)
Medal record
Men's football
Representing Angola
African Nations Championship
Runner-up	2011 Sudan
- * Club domestic league appearances and goals as of 4 November 2017 ‡ National team caps and goals as of 6 July 2016

Fernando Agostinho da Costa (born October 10, 1981, in Luanda) better known as Chara, is an Angolan retired football midfielder.

Chara has appeared for Petro Atlético since 2006 and has appeared with the Angola national team since 2006, although not called up to the national team until after the 2006 FIFA World Cup due to his lack of experience. He was called up for the 2010 African Nations Cup due to the injury to André Macanga. He has 17 caps for the national team.

== Honours ==
Angola

- African Nations Championship: runner-up 2011
