= Beto Bianchi =

Brazilian footballer and coach (born 1966)

Personal information
- Full name: Roberto Luiz Bianchi Pelliser
- Date of birth: 6 November 1966 (age 60)
- Place of birth: Itatiba, Brazil
- Height: 1.74 m (5 ft 9 in)
- Position: Defender

Team information
- Current team: Vipers SC (manager)

Youth career
- 1978–1981: Guarani
- 1982–1983: Portuguesa
- 1983–1985: São Bento

Senior career*
Years	Team	Apps	(Gls)
1985	São Bento		
1986–1989	VOCEM		
1990–1991	Naviraiense		
1991–1995	Caravaca		
1995–1997	Bullense		
1998	Beijing Guoan		
1998–1999	Yeclano	4	(0)
1999–2001	Ciudad de Murcia		

Managerial career
- 2004–2007: Ciudad de Murcia B
- 2007–2009: Atlético Ciudad
- 2009–2010: Zamora
- 2010: Lorca Deportiva
- 2011: Batavia Union
- 2012–2013: Pro Duta
- 2013–2014: RRFC Montegnée
- 2014–2015: Shabab Al-Ordon
- 2016–2019: Petro de Luanda
- 2017: Angola
- 2020–2021: Kazma
- 2021: Interclube
- 2023–: Vipers SC
- * Club domestic league appearances and goals

Roberto Luiz Bianchi Pelliser (born 6 November 1966) is a Brazilian football coach and former player who is the manager of Ugandan club Vipers SC.

== Playing career ==
As a player, he played as a defender for Spanish clubs Caravaca and Yeclano.

== Coaching career ==
He managed Spanish club teams Ciudad de Murcia, Atlético Ciudad, Zamora and Lorca Deportiva. He also coached in Indonesia and Jordan.

He became manager of the Angola national team in March 2017; at the time, he had been manager of Angolan club side Petro de Luanda since 2016. He was replaced by Srđan Vasiljević in December 2017. He left Petro in April 2019. In 2020 he began managing Kuwaiti club Kazma. He left Kazma in June 2021.

After managing Angolan club Interclube in 2021, in January 2023 he became manager of Ugandan club Vipers SC.

== Personal life ==
He is of Spanish descent.
