= Lamá (footballer, born 1981) =

Angolan footballer

Personal information
- Full name: Luís Maimona João
- Date of birth: February 1, 1981 (age 45)
- Place of birth: Luanda, Angola
- Height: 1.87 m (6 ft 1 1/2 in)
- Position: Goalkeeper

Senior career*
Years	Team	Apps	(Gls)
1999–2018	Petro Luanda	305	(0)

International career^{‡}
2003–2013	Angola	56	(0)
Medal record
Men's football
Representing Angola
African Nations Championship
Runner-up	2011 Sudan
- * Club domestic league appearances and goals as of 21 June 2006 ‡ National team caps and goals as of 25 February 2017

Luís Maimona João (born February 1, 1981, in Luanda), nicknamed Lamá, is an Angolan retired football goalkeeper, who played for Petro Luanda in the Girabola.

== International career ==
Lamá is a member of his national team, and was called up to the 2006 World Cup. He was part of Angola's 2001 FIFA Youth Championship squad. He was first-choice for Angola at the 2008 Africa Cup of Nations in Ghana and performed really well, making some key saves during the competition.

== National team statistics ==
Angola national team
Year	Apps	Goals
2003	1	0
2004	4	0
2005	3	0
2006	5	0
2007	4	0
2008	14	0
2009	9	0
2010	5	0
2011	3	0
2012	5	0
2013	3	0
Total	56	0

== Honours ==
Angola

- African Nations Championship: runner-up 2011
