= Job (footballer) =

Angolan footballer (born 1987)

Personal information
- Full name: Ricardo Job Estévão
- Date of birth: 27 September 1987 (age 39)
- Place of birth: Moxico, Angola
- Height: 1.73 m (5 ft 8 in)
- Position: Midfielder

Senior career*
Years	Team	Apps	(Gls)
2006–2008	ASA		
2008–2022	Petro Luanda		

International career^{‡}
2007–2018	Angola	55	(5)
Medal record
Men's football
Representing Angola
African Nations Championship
Runner-up	2011 Sudan
- * Club domestic league appearances and goals as of 28 January 2008 ‡ National team caps and goals as of 20 January 2018

Ricardo Job Estévão (born 22 August 1987), better known as Job, is an Angolan former footballer who played as a midfielder for Petro Atlético and ASA. For the Angola national team, he made 55 appearances scoring 5 goals.

== Career ==
Job was born in Moxico, Angola. He plays for Petro Atlético in the capital Luanda since 2008, he has previously played for Atlético Sport Aviação.

Job was called up to the Angola national team squad for the 2010 African Nations Cup. In total, he made 55 appearances scoring 5 goals.

== Career statistics ==
Scores and results list Angola's goal tally first.

No	Date	Venue	Opponent	Score	Result	Competition
1.	1 June 2008	Estádio dos Coqueiros, Luanda, Angola	Benin	2–0	3–0	2010 FIFA World Cup qualification
2.	3 March 2010	Estádio 11 de Novembro, Luanda, Angola	Latvia	1–1	1–1	Friendly
3.	15 June 2013	National Stadium, Kampala, Uganda	Uganda	1–0	1–1	2014 FIFA World Cup qualification
4.	23 June 2013	Somhlolo National Stadium, Lobamba, Swaziland	Swaziland	1–0	1–0	2014 African Nations Championship qualification
5.	16 July 2017	Stade Anjalay, Belle Vue Maurel, Mauritius	Mauritius	1–0	1–0	2018 African Nations Championship qualification
6.	23 July 2017	Estádio 11 de Novembro, Luanda, Angola	Mauritius	1–0	3–2	2018 African Nations Championship qualification
7.	20 January 2018	Stade Adrar, Agadir, Morocco	Cameroon	1–0	1–0	2018 African Nations Championship

== Honours ==
Angola

- African Nations Championship: runner-up 2011
