= Carlinhos (footballer, born March 1995) =

Angolan footballer

Personal information
- Full name: Carlos Sténio Fernandes Guimarães do Carmo
- Date of birth: 19 March 1995 (age 31)
- Place of birth: Luanda, Angola
- Height: 1.72 m (5 ft 7 1/2 in)
- Position: Midfielder

Team information
- Current team: Cape Town City

Youth career
- 2009–2013: Petro Luanda

Senior career*
| Years | Team | Apps | (Gls) |
| 2013–2019 | Petro Luanda | 87 | (11) |
| 2013–2014 | → Porcelana Cazengo (loan) | | |
| 2019–2020 | Interclube | 14 | (1) |
| 2020–2021 | Young Africans | 3 | (0) |
| 2021–2022 | Sagrada Esperança | 12 | (1) |
| 2022–2024 | Petro Luanda | 37 | (3) |
| 2024– | Cape Town City | 0 | (0) |

International career^{‡}
| 2013–2022 | Angola | 14 | (0) |
- * Club domestic league appearances and goals as of 26 October 2024 ‡ National team caps and goals as of 26 October 2024

Carlos Sténio Fernandes Guimarães do Carmo (born 19 March 1995), commonly known as Carlinhos, is an Angolan footballer who plays as a midfielder for Cape Town City.

In July 2024 he joined Cape Town City. However, already in August 2024 he had to undergo surgery, missing most of the 2024–25 season as a result.

== Career statistics ==
=== Club ===
As of 23 September 2018.

| Club | Season | League | | | Cup | | Continental | | Other | | Total | |
| Club | Season | Division | Apps | Goals | Apps | Goals | Apps | Goals | Apps | Goals | Apps | Goals |
|---|---|---|---|---|---|---|---|---|---|---|---|---|
| Petro Luanda | 2014 | Girabola | 2 | 0 | | | – | | 0 | 0 | 2 | 0 |
| Petro Luanda | 2015 | Girabola | 11 | 0 | | | 1 (Note: Appearances in the CAF Confederation Cup) | 0 | 0 | 0 | 12 | 0 |
| Petro Luanda | 2016 | Girabola | 23 | 4 | | | – | | 0 | 0 | 23 | 4 |
| Petro Luanda | 2017 | Girabola | 21 | 4 | | | – | | 0 | 0 | 21 | 4 |
| Petro Luanda | 2018 | Girabola | 15 | 1 | | | 3 | 0 | 0 | 0 | 18 | 1 |
| Petro Luanda | 2018–19 | Girabola | 15 | 2 | | | 5 | 0 | 0 | 0 | 20 | 2 |
| Petro Luanda | Total | | 87 | 11 | | | 9 | 0 | 0 | 0 | 96 | 11 |
| Interclube | 2019–20 | Girabola | 14 | 1 | | | | | | | | |
| Career total | | | 87 | 11 | 0 | 0 | 9 | 0 | 0 | 0 | 96 | 11 |

=== International ===
As of matches played 23 September 2018.

| National team | Year | Apps | Goals |
|---|---|---|---|
| Angola | 2013 | 1 | 0 |
| Angola | 2016 | 4 | 0 |
| Angola | 2017 | 2 | 0 |
| Angola | 2018 | 3 | 0 |
| Total | | 10 | 0 |
