= 2020–21 Atlético Petróleos de Luanda season =

Atlético Petróleos de Luanda
2020–21 season
- President: Tomás Faria
- Manager: Toni Cosano (Mar 2019–Feb 2021); Mateus Agostinho (Feb 2021–)
- Stadium: Estádio 11 de Novembro
- Top goalscorer: League: Picas (5); All: Yano, Picas (5)
- Biggest win: 5–1 Baixa de Cassanje (12 Jan 2021)
Home colours	Away colours	Third colours
- All statistics correct as of 3 February 2021.

The 2020–21 season of Atlético Petróleos de Luanda is the club's 40th season in the Girabola, the Angolan Premier football League and 40th consecutive season in the top flight of Angolan football. In 2020–21, the club is participating in the Girabola, the Angola Cup and the CAF Champions League.

== Squad information ==
As of December 2020

Squad No.	Name	Nationality	Position(s)	Place of birth	Date of birth (age)	Previous club
Goalkeepers
1	Signori Dominique António	(Angola) (Switzerland)	GK	Lausanne, Switzerland	25 July 1994 (aged 27)	(Switzerland) FC Basel
12	Jorge Delgado Elber	(Angola) (Cape Verde)	GK	Luanda, Angola	24 June 1991 (aged 30)	(Angola) Kabuscorp
22	Gerson Barros	(Angola) (Portugal)	GK	Luanda, Angola	1 April 1987 (aged 34)	(Angola) Santos FC
30	Augusto Mualucano	(Angola)	GK	Luanda, Angola	1 January 1998 (aged 23)	(Angola) Junior team
Defenders
3	Ariclene Oliveira Ary	(Angola)	LB	Luanda, Angola	6 August 1992 (aged 29)	(Angola) Recreativo do Libolo
4	Musah Inusah	(Ghana)	CB	Ghana	1 February 1994 (aged 27)	(Ghana) Hearts of Oak
5	José-Junior Matuwila	(Angola) (Germany)	CB	Bonn, Germany	20 September 1991 (aged 30)	(Germany) Rot-Weiss Essen
7	Diógenes João	(Angola)	RB	Luanda, Angola	1 January 1997 (aged 24)	(Angola) Junior team
13	Augusto Carneiro Tó	(Angola)	LB	Luanda, Angola	5 November 1995 (aged 26)	(Angola) Interclube
15	Wilson Gaspar	(Angola) (Portugal)	CB	Porto, Portugal	29 September 1990 (aged 31)	(Angola) Kabuscorp
18	Victor Pedro Nangue Vidinho	(Angola)	CB	Luanda, Angola	25 February 1998 (aged 23)	(Angola) Santa Rita de Cássia
24	Euclides dos Santos Kelson	(Angola)	CB	Benguela, Angola	18 January 2000 (aged 21)	(Angola) Junior team
25	Eddie Afonso	(Angola)	LB	Luanda, Angola	7 March 1994 (aged 27)	(Angola) Recreativo do Libolo
28	Pedro Bondo	(Angola)	LB	Luanda, Angola	16 November 2004 (aged 17)	(Angola) Junior team
29	Daniel Kilola Danilson	(Angola)	CB	Luanda, Angola	6 July 1999 (aged 22)	(Angola) Junior team
32	Armando Canji Mindinho	(Angola)	CB	Luanda, Angola	18 October 2004 (aged 17)	(Angola) Junior team
Midfielders
2	Hermenegildo Sengui Picas	(Angola)	LW	D.R. Congo	14 February 2001 (aged 20)	(Angola) Junior team
3	Mário Manuel de Oliveira Ito	(Angola)	DM	Luanda, Angola	29 November 1994 (aged 27)	(Angola) Interclube
6	Joaquim Adão Lungieki João	(Angola) (Switzerland)	DM	Fribourg, Switzerland	2 March 1998 (aged 23)	(Switzerland) FC Sion
8	Silas Satonho Dany	(Angola)	AM/CM	Luanda, Angola	14 January 1990 (aged 31)	(Angola) Kabuscorp
10	Augusto Quibeto Manguxi	(Angola)	CM	Luanda, Angola	27 November 1991 (aged 30)	(Angola) Santos FC
11	Ricardo Job Estevão	(Angola)	RW	Luanda, Angola	27 September 1987 (aged 34)	(Angola) ASA
14	Pedro Pessoa Miguel Megue	(Angola)	LW	Angola	2 March 1998 (aged 23)	(Angola) Junior team
16	Santos Kiaku Dos Santos	(Angola)	MF	Luanda, Angola	6 June 2001 (aged 20)	(Angola) Junior team
17	Isaac Mensah	(Ghana)	AM	Accra, Ghana	13 December 1995 (aged 26)	(Ghana) Hearts of Oak
19	António Ribeiro Tony	(Brazil)	RW/LW	Vitória, Brazil	6 October 1992 (aged 29)	(Brazil) Brusque F.C.
20	Alberto Miguel Além	(Angola)	DM	Luanda, Angola	6 December 1997 (aged 24)	(Angola) Progresso Sambizanga
27	Maikon Fernando Souza Leite	(Brazil)	RW	Mogi das Cruzes, Brazil	3 August 1988 (aged 33)	(Brazil) Amazonas FC
Forwards
9	Adriano Nicolau Yano	(Angola)	ST	Luanda, Angola	8 July 1992 (aged 29)	(Angola) Progresso Sambizanga
26	Tiago Lima Leal Azulão	(Brazil)	FW	São Paulo, Brazil	26 March 1986 (aged 35)	(Greece) Olympiakos Nicosia

=== Staff ===
Nat	Name	Position(s)	Date of birth (age)
Technical staff
(Spain)	Mateus Agostinho Bodunha	Head coach	28 July 1974 (aged 47)
(Angola)	Flávio Amado	Assistant coach	30 December 1979 (aged 42)
(Angola)	João Ndoce	Assistant coach	–
Medical
(Angola)	Nelson Bolivar	Physician	–
(Brazil)	Maurício Marques	Physio	–
(Angola)	Ramiro José	Masseur	–
Management
(Angola)	Tomás Faria	Chairman	–
(Angola)	Sidónio Malamba	Head of Foot Dept	–

=== Pre-season transfers ===
No.	Nat	Nick	Name	Pos	Date of birth (age)	
Transfers out To
3	(Angola)	Ary	Ariclene Assunção Oliveira	FW	6 August 1992 (aged 29)	Académica do Lobito
9	(Rwanda)	Jacques	Jacques Tuyisenge	FW	22 September 1991 (aged 30)	APR F.C.
18	(Angola)	Herenilson	Herenilson Caifalo do Carmo	MF	23 May 1996 (aged 25)	Primeiro de Agosto
21	(Angola)	Caranga	Jorge Mendes Corte-Real Carneiro	MF	19 February 1992 (aged 29)	Sagrada Esperança
23	(Angola)	Nari	Bráulio Adélio de Olim Diniz	MF	30 April 1987 (aged 34)	Progresso
Transfers in From
1	(Angola)	Dominique	Signori Dominique Nymi António	FW	25 July 1994 (aged 27)	FC Basel
3	(Angola)	Ito	Mário Manuel de Oliveira	MF	29 November 1994 (aged 27)	Interclube
5	(Angola)	Matuwila	José-Junior Matuwila	DF	20 September 1991 (aged 30)	Rot-Weiss Essen
6	(Angola)	Joaquim Adão	Joaquim Adão Lungieki João	DM	14 July 1992 (aged 29)	FC Sion
18	(Angola)	Vidinho	Victor Pedro Nangue	DF	25 February 1998 (aged 23)	Santa Rita de Cássia
26	(Brazil)	Azulão	Tiago Lima Leal	FW	26 March 1986 (aged 35)	Olympiakos Nicosia
27	(Brazil)	Maikon	Maikon Fernando Souza Leite	MF	3 August 1988 (aged 33)	Amazonas FC

=== Mid-season transfers ===
No.	Nat	Nick	Name	Pos	Date of birth (age)	
Transfers out To
Transfers in From
23	(Angola)	Figueira	Figueira A.A. Joaquim	MF	3 October 2002 (aged 18)	Youth academy
37	(Angola)	Maya	Mauro Macuta Simão	MF	15 August 2004 (aged 16)	Youth academy

== Overview ==
Competition	First match	Last match	Record							
Competition	First match	Last match	Pld	W	D	L	GF	GA	GD	Win %
Girabola	28 December 2021	28 February 2021	12	8	1	3	24	10	+14	66.67
Angola Cup			0	0	0	0	0	0	+0	—
CAF Champions League	29 November 2020	6 March 2021	7	2	2	3	5	8	−3	28.57
Total			19	10	3	6	29	18	+11	52.63

Last updated: 6 March 2021

== Angolan League ==
The 2020-21 season of the Girabola kicked off on December 26, 2020 with Petro de Luanda making their debut on December 28 in a home match win against Bravos do Maquis.

=== League table ===
Pos	Team	Pld	W	D	L	GF	GA	GD	Pts	Qualification or relegation
1	Sagrada Esperança (C)	30	21	7	2	42	10	+32	70	Qualification for Champions League
2	Petro de Luanda (Q)	30	21	4	5	47	17	+30	67	Qualification for Champions League
3	Primeiro de Agosto (Q)	30	19	7	4	54	23	+31	64	Qualification for Confederation Cup
4	Bravos do Maquis (Note: Bravos do Maquis was awarded 6 points and 3–0 wins against Santa Rita and Desportivo da Huíla in the 11th and 6th round matches, respectively.)	30	15	10	5	43	23	+20	55	
5	Interclube (Note: Santa Rita was awarded a 3–0 win against Interclube as Interclube failed to produce valid licences in their away match against Santa Rita.)	30	11	11	8	35	22	+13	44	

Updated to match(es) played on 31 July 2021. Source: Girabola.com Girabola, SOCCERWAY
Rules for classification: 1) Points; 2) Head-to-head points; 3) Goal difference; 4) Head-to-head goal difference; 5) Goals scored; 6) Fair-play points; 7) Play-off.
(C) Champions; (Q) Qualified to the phase indicated

=== Match details ===
Mon, 28 Dec 2020 01	Petro Atlético	3–1	Bravos do Maquis	11 de Novembro, Luanda
16:30 WAT (UTC+1)	Picas 45', 57'; Tony 83'		70' Benarfa	Referee: João Goma; Ivanildo Lopes, Evanildo Martins
Note: Dominique / Eddie, Matuwila, Musah, Pedro / Além, Ito (substituted off) 90+1', Job (c), Picas (substituted off) 85' / Azulão (substituted off) 90', Yano (substituted off) 71' — Tony (substituted on) 71', Maikon (substituted on) 85', Megue (substituted on) 90', Manguxi (substituted on) 90+1'

Sat, 02 Jan 2021 02	Rec do Libolo	0–3	Petro Atlético	11 de Novembro (Note: Match to be played at away court for mutual agreement. Home court rule to be reversed on the 2nd leg match), Luanda
15:00 WAT (UTC+1)			Yano 27'; Azulão 54'; Job 71'	Referee: Airton Carmelino; Ivanildo Lopes, Evanildo Martins
Note: Dominique / Eddie, Matuwila, Musah, Pedro / Além, Ito (substituted off) 45', Job (c) (substituted off) 82', Picas (substituted off) 68' / Azulão (substituted off) 74', Yano (substituted off) 83' — Joaquim Adão (substituted on) 45', Maikon (substituted on) 68', Tony (substituted on) 74', Megue (substituted on) 82', Manguxi (substituted on) 83'

Tue, 12 Jan 2021 03	Petro Atlético	5–1	Baixa de Cassanje	11 de Novembro, Luanda
16:30 WAT (UTC+1)	Dany 12'; Geúda 54' (o.g.); Picas 55', 84'; Megue 88'		76' Magrinho	Referee: Mbunga Nkazi
Note: Dominique / Eddie, Matuwila, Musah (substituted off) 67', Tó Carneiro / Dany (substituted off) 67', Ito (substituted off) 62', Job (c) (substituted off) 62', Maikon (substituted off) 44' / Tony, Yano — Picas (substituted on) 44', Joaquim Adão (substituted on) 62', Megue (substituted on) 62', Dos Santos (substituted on) 67', Kelson (substituted on) 67'

Sun, 17 Jan 2021 04	S^{ta} Rita de Cássia	2–1	Petro Atlético	4 de Janeiro, Uíge
15:00 WAT (UTC+1)	Gui 20', 53'	Report	4' (pen.) Job	Referee: João Mavungo; Evaristo Baco, João Bundo
Note: Dominique / Eddie, Matuwila, Musah, Pedro / Além, Dany (substituted off) 80', Joaquim Adão (substituted off) 64', Job (c) / Mensah, Picas (substituted off) 80' — Megue (substituted on) 64', Diógenes (substituted on) 80', Dos Santos (substituted on) 80'

Wed, 20 Jan 2021 05	Petro Atlético	1–0	Interclube	11 de Novembro, Luanda
16:30 WAT (UTC+1)	Manguxi 64'			Referee: Hélder Martins; Joaquim da Rocha, José Felix
Note: Dominique / Diógenes, Matuwila, Musah, Tó Carneiro / Além, Dany (substituted off) 76', Dos Santos (substituted off) 45', Job (c) / Mensah, Picas — Manguxi (substituted on) 45', Megue (substituted on) 76'

Sun, 24 Jan 2021 06	Wiliete SC	0–3	Petro Atlético	Ombaka, Benguela
15:30 WAT (UTC+1)		Report	14', 57' Yano; 24' Mensah	Referee: José Chitumba; Estanislau Guedes, Rosário Calembela
Note: Dominique / Diógenes (substituted off) 63', Matuwila, Musah, Tó Carneiro / Além (substituted off) 76', Dany (substituted off) 76', Job (c), Manguxi / Mensah (substituted off) 62', Yano (substituted off) 78' — Picas (substituted on) 62', Eddie (substituted on) 63', Joaquim Adão (substituted on) 76', Megue (substituted on) 76', Azulão (substituted on) 78'

Sat, 30 Jan 2021 07	Petro Atlético	0–0	Rec da Caála	11 de Novembro, Luanda
16:30 WAT (UTC+1)				Referee: Carlos Armando; Manuel Lobe, Bedilson Bui
Note: Dominique / Diógenes, Ito, Musah, Tó Carneiro / Além (substituted off) 56', Dany (substituted off) 55', Job (c), Manguxi / Mensah (substituted off) 56', Yano — Azulão (substituted on) 55', Picas (substituted on) 56', Joaquim Adão (substituted on) 56'

Wed, 03 Feb 2021 08	Progresso	2–3	Petro Atlético	Coqueiros, Luanda
16:30 WAT (UTC+1)	Julinho 15'; Filhão 28'		16' Azulão; 36' Job; 50' Picas	Referee: Miguel Mateus; Luís Mateus, António Teixeira
Note: Dominique / Diógenes, Ito, Musah, Tó Carneiro / Além (substituted off) 88', Job (c), Manguxi (substituted off) 88', Picas / Azulão (substituted off) 80', Yano (substituted off) 68' — Mensah (substituted on) 68', Tony (substituted on) 80', Dos Santos (substituted on) 88', Joaquim Adão (substituted on) 88'

Sun, 07 Feb 2021 09	1º de Agosto	1–0	Petro Atlético	11 de Novembro, Luanda
17:00 WAT (UTC+1)	Matuwila 86' (o.g.)			Referee: Bernardo Nangolo; Ivanildo Martins, Evanildo Lopes
Note: Dominique / Diógenes (c), Matuwila, Musah, Tó Carneiro / Além, Manguxi (substituted off) 84', Mensah, Picas (substituted off) 17' / Azulão (substituted off) 84', Yano (substituted off) 66' — Eddie (substituted on) 17', Dos Santos (substituted on) 66', Tony (substituted on) 84', Megue (substituted on) 84'

Wed, 17 Feb 2021 11	Sporting Cabinda	3–0	Petro Atlético	Tafe, Cabinda
17:00 WAT (UTC+1)	Yele 11'; Castro 26'; Lazi 35'			Referee: Mauro de Oliveira; Domingos Francisco, Nery da Silva
Note: Dominique / Diógenes (c), Ito, Matuwila, Tó Carneiro / Além, Dany, Manguxi, Picas / Azulão, Tony —

Sat, 20 Feb 2021 12	Petro Atlético	3–0	Ferrovia Huambo	11 de Novembro, Luanda
16:30 WAT (UTC+1)	Azulão 20', 77' (pen.); Yano 86'			Referee: Donaciano Mulumba
Note: Dominique / Eddie, Ito, Pedro (substituted off) 84', Vidinho / Joaquim Adão, Job (c) (substituted off) 84', Megue (substituted off) 81', Picas / Azulão (substituted off) 80', Tony (substituted off) 67' — Picas (substituted on) 67', Yano (substituted on) 80', Além (substituted on) 81', Maikon (substituted on) 84', Diógenes (substituted on) 80'

Wed, 24 Feb 2021 13	Cuando Cubango	0–2	Petro Atlético	Eucaliptos, Kuito
15:30 WAT (UTC+1)		Report	9', 44' Azulão	Referee: António Dungula; Tito Capingala, Lucas Caliongo
Note: Dominique / Danilson, Diógenes, Matuwila, Pedro / Dany, Ito, Job (c) (substituted off) 70', Manguxi (substituted off) 59' / Azulão (substituted off) 76', Picas (substituted off) 76' — Lisandro (substituted on) 59', Tony (substituted on) 70', Nelinho (substituted on) 76', Yano (substituted on) 76'

Wed, 31 Mar 2021 14	Petro Atlético	2–1	Desportivo Huíla	11 de Novembro, Luanda
16:00 WAT (UTC+1)	Job 4'; Picas 46'		90+1' Emmanuel	Referee: Yuri de Melo; Cláudio Francisco, Adão da Silva
Note: Dominique / Eddie, Matuwila, Mindinho, Pedro / Dany (substituted off) 73', Ito, Dos Santos, Job (c) / Azulão (substituted off) 66', Picas (substituted off) 73' — Yano (substituted on) 66', Mensah (substituted on) 73', Lisandro (substituted on) 73'

Tue, 20 Apr 2021 10	Petro Atlético	1–0	Académica	11 de Novembro, Luanda
16:30 WAT (UTC+1)	Mensah 46'			Referee: Chitano Francisco; Wilson Ntyamba, Luísa Luhaco
Note: Elber / Danilson, Messias, Mindinho, Pedro (substituted off) 70' / Dany, Ito, Job (c), Lisandro (substituted off) 45' / Picas (substituted off) 30', Yano — Mensah (substituted on) 30', Azulão (substituted on) 45', Tó Carneiro (substituted on) 70'

Fri, 23 Apr 2021 15	Sagrada	1–0	Petro Atlético	Sagrada Esperança, Dundo
15:30 WAT (UTC+1)	Lépua 64'			Referee: Hélder Martins; Joaquim da Rocha
Note: Elber / Danilson, Messias, Mindinho, Pedro / Dany, Ito, Job (c), Manguxi (substituted off) 67', Mensah (substituted off) 58' / Yano — Tó Carneiro (substituted on) 58', Azulão (substituted on) 67'

Wed, 21 Apr 2021 16	Bravos do Maquis	1–1	Petro Atlético	Mundunduleno, Luena
15:00 WAT (UTC+1)		Report		Referee: Nuno Sumbo; Nílton Armando, Joaquim Tchiyo
Note: Elber / Danilson (substituted off) 36', Diógenes, Mindinho, Pedro / Dany (substituted off) 56', Ito, Job (c), Maya / Azulão (substituted off) 75' — Vidinho (substituted on) 36', Yano (substituted on) 56', Figueira (substituted on) 56', Manguxi (substituted on) 75'

Sat, 01 May 2021 17	Petro Atlético	1–1	Rec do Libolo	Estádio Municipal, Calulo
15:00 WAT (UTC+1)	Picas 48'		42' (pen.) Fofó	Referee: Feliciano Lucas; Nicodemos Calembela, Alexandre Bengue
Note: Elber / Danilson, Diógenes, Mindinho, Pedro / Dany (substituted off) 45', Ito, Job (c) (substituted off) 45', Maya / Azulão, Picas — Figueira (substituted on) 45', Megue (substituted on) 45'

Sat, 08 May 2021 18	Baixa de Cassanje	1–2	Petro Atlético	1º de Maio, Malanje
15:30 WAT (UTC+1)	Maludi 25'	Report	33' Megue; 90+4' Figueira	Referee: João Mavungo; Evaristo Buco, João Bundo
Note: Elber / Diógenes, Mindinho, Tó Carneiro, Vidinho / Ito, Job (c) (substituted off) 65', Maya (substituted off) 59', Megue (substituted off) 78' / Azulão, Picas (substituted off) 65' — Yano (substituted on) 59', Figueira (substituted on) 65', Maikon (substituted on) 65', Dany (substituted on) 78'

Wed, 12 May 2021 19	Petro Atlético	1–0	S^{ta} Rita de Cássia	22 de Junho, Luanda
15:30 WAT (UTC+1)	Azulão 81'			Referee: Rodrigues Aleixo; Nicodemos Calembela, Francisco Paulo
Note: Elber / Diógenes, Mindinho, Tó Carneiro, Vidinho / Além (substituted off) 61', Job (c) (substituted off) 90+1', Maya, Megue (substituted off) 61' / Azulão, Picas (substituted off) 45' — Figueira (substituted on) 45', Yano (substituted on) 61', Dos Santos (substituted on) 61', Mensah (substituted on) 90+1'

Sat, 15 May 2021 20	Interclube	0–1	Petro Atlético	22 de Junho, Luanda
15:30 WAT (UTC+1)			1' Azulão	Referee: Paulo Sérgio; Segunda Tchisseque, Ilídio Coimbra
Note: Elber / Diógenes, Mindinho, Tó Carneiro, Vidinho / Ito (substituted off) 62', Job (c), Maya, Megue (substituted off) 55' / Azulão (substituted off) 83', Picas (substituted off) 55' — Dos Santos (substituted on) 55', Figueira (substituted on) 55', Dany (substituted on) 62', Yano (substituted on) 83'

Sun, 23 May 2021 21	Petro Atlético	2–0	Wiliete SC	11 de Novembro, Luanda
15:00 WAT (UTC+1)	Azulão 53'; Tony 55'
Note: Elber / Diógenes, Mindinho, Tó Carneiro, Vidinho / Dos Santos, Job (c), Maya, Megue (substituted off) 55' / Azulão (substituted on) 82', Picas (substituted off) 53' — Tony (substituted on) 53', Figueira (substituted on) 55', Manguxi (substituted on) 82'

Sat, 29 May 2021 22	Rec da Caála	0–1	Petro Atlético	Mártires da Canhala, Caála
16:00 WAT (UTC+1)			27' Job	Referee: Nelson Milagre; Manuel Coelho, Tomás Lima
Note: Elber / Diógenes, Mindinho, Tó Carneiro, Vidinho / Dos Santos, Job (c) (substituted off) 76', Maya, Megue (substituted off) 62' / Azulão, Picas (substituted off) 68' — Além (substituted on) 62', Tony (substituted on) 68', Figueira (substituted on) 76', Manguxi (substituted on) 82'

Wed, 02 Jun 2021 23	Petro Atlético	3–1	Progresso	11 de Novembro, Luanda
16:00 WAT (UTC+1)	Azulão 10', 28', 71'		84' Julinho	Referee: Sabino de Carvalho; João Fula, Ladislau Dias
Note: Elber / Diógenes, Mindinho, Tó Carneiro, Vidinho / Dos Santos, Job (c) (substituted off) 72', Maya, Megue (substituted off) 66' / Azulão (substituted off) 72', Picas (substituted off) 66' — Manguxi (substituted on) 66', Figueira (substituted on) 66', Tony (substituted on) 72', Yano (substituted on) 72'

Sat, 19 Jun 2021 24	Petro Atlético	3–0	1º de Agosto	11 de Novembro, Luanda
15:30 WAT (UTC+1)				Referee: Hélder Martins; Jerson Emiliano, Ivanildo Lopes
Note: Elber / Diógenes (substituted off) 68', Mindinho, Tó Carneiro, Vidinho / Além, Job (c), Maya, Megue / Azulão (substituted off) 87', Picas (substituted off) 62' — Tony (substituted on) 62', Wilson (substituted on) 68', Yano (substituted on) 87', Figueira (substituted on) 87'

Sat, 20 Jun 2021 25	Académica	0–1	Petro Atlético	Ombaka, Benguela
15:30 WAT (UTC+1)		Report	55' Megue	Referee: Feliciano Lucas; Alexandre Bengue, Horácio Tchissingue
Note: Elber / Diógenes, Mindinho, Tó Carneiro, Vidinho / Além, Job (c), Maya, Megue (substituted off) 82' / Azulão (substituted off) 82', Picas (substituted off) 69' — Figueira (substituted on) 69', Tony (substituted on) 82', Dany (substituted on) 82'

Sun, 27 Jun 2021 26	Petro Atlético	1–0	Sporting Cabinda	11 de Novembro, Luanda
16:00 WAT (UTC+1)	Megue			Referee: Mbunga Nkazi; Tomás Lima, Sérgio David
Note: Elber / Diógenes, Mindinho, Tó Carneiro, Vidinho / Ito, Job (c) (substituted off) 80', Maya, Megue (substituted off) 75' / Azulão (substituted off) 80', Picas (substituted off) 75' — Dany (substituted on) 75', Figueira (substituted on) 75', Tony (substituted on) 80', Yano (substituted on) 80'

Sat, 03 Jul 2021 27	Ferrovia Huambo	0–2	Petro Atlético	Estádio do Ferrovia, Huambo
16:00 WAT (UTC+1)			24' Azulão; 82' Job	Referee: Bernardo Nangolo; Pedro Alberto, António Pitra
Note: Elber / Eddie, Mindinho, Tó Carneiro, Vidinho / Além, Job (c) (substituted off) 84', Maya, Megue (substituted off) 78' / Azulão (substituted off) 84', Picas (substituted off) 65' — Tony (substituted on) 65', Dany (substituted on) 78', Figueira (substituted on) 84', Yano (substituted on) 84'

Mon, 19 Jul 2021 28	Petro Atlético	0–0	Cuando Cubango	11 de Novembro, Luanda
15:00 WAT (UTC+1)				Referee: Rodrigues Aleixo; Nicodemos Calembela, Francisco Paulo
Note: Elber / Eddie, Mindinho, Tó Carneiro, Vidinho / Além, Job (c) (substituted off) 65', Maya, Megue (substituted off) 45' / Azulão (substituted off) 58', Picas — Figueira (substituted on) 45', Tony (substituted on) 58', Joy (substituted on) 65'

Sat, 24 Jul 2021 29	Desportivo Huíla	0–1	Petro Atlético	Estádio do Ferrovia, Lubango
15:00 WAT (UTC+1)		Report	51' Azulão	Referee: Carlos Armando; Manuel Lobe, Alberto Dumbi
Note: Elber / Eddie, Mindinho, Tó Carneiro, Vidinho / Além, Job (c), Maya, Megue / Azulão, Picas (substituted off) 87' — Tony (substituted on) 87'

Sat, 31 Jul 2021 30	Petro Atlético	0–1	Sagrada	11 de Novembro, Luanda
15:00 WAT (UTC+1)			22' Luís Tati	Referee: António Dungula; Jerson Emiliano, Wilson Ntyamba
Note: Elber (c) / Eddie, Mindinho, Tó Carneiro, Vidinho / Além (substituted on) 55', Job (substituted off) 76', Maya, Megue / Azulão (substituted off) 66', Picas — Yano (substituted on) 55', Tony (substituted on) 66', Figueira (substituted on) 76'

=== Results ===
==== Results by round ====
Round	1	2	3	4	5	6	7	8	9	10	11	12	13	14	15	16	17	18	19	20	21	22	23	24	25	26	27	28	29	30
Ground	H	H	H	A	H	A	H	A	H	H	A	H	A	H	A	A	A	A	H	A	H	A	H	A	A	H	A	H	A	H
Result	W	W	W	L	W	W	D	W	L		L	W	W																	
Position	2	1	1																											

Updated to match(es) played on 28 February 2021. Source: girabolazap.co.ao
A = Away; H = Home; W = Win; D = Draw; L = Loss

==== Results summary ====
Overall								Home						Away					
Pld	W	D	L	GF	GA	GD	Pts	W	D	L	GF	GA	GD	W	D	L	GF	GA	GD
10	6	1	3	19	10	+9	19	3	1	0	9	2	+7	3	0	3	10	8	+2

Last updated: 13 February 2021.

== CAF Champions League ==
=== Group stage ===
Pos	Team	Pld	W	D	L	GF	GA	GD	Pts	Qualification
1	(Morocco) Wydad AC	6	4	1	1	9	1	+8	13	Advance to knockout stage
2	(South Africa) Kaizer Chiefs	6	2	3	1	5	6	−1	9 (Note: Tied on head-to-head points (2), on head-to-head goal difference (0) and on head-to-head goals scored (2). Head-to-head away goals scored: Kaizer Chiefs 2, Horoya 0.)	Advance to knockout stage
3	(Guinea) Horoya	6	2	3	1	5	4	+1	9	
4	(Angola) Petro de Luanda	6	0	1	5	0	8	−8	1	

Source: Soccerway
Rules for classification: Group stage tiebreakers
Notes:

Fri, 09 Apr 2021 R3 2L	Wydad (Morocco)	–	(Angola) Petro Atlético	Mohammed V, Casablanca
: CET (UTC+1)

Sat, 03 Apr 2021 R2 2L	Petro Atlético (Angola)	0–1	(Guinea) Horoya	11 de Novembro, Luanda
17:00 WAT (UTC+1)
Note: Dominique / Danilson, Diógenes, Mindinho, Pedro / Além (substituted off) 45', Dany (substituted off) 45', Ito (substituted off) 89', Job (c) (substituted off) 79', Picas (substituted off) 67' / Azulão — Lisandro (substituted on) 45', Manguxi (substituted on) 45', Mensah (substituted on) 67', Yano (substituted on) 79', Nelinho (substituted on) 89'

Tue, 16 Mar 2021 R1 2L	Petro Atlético (Angola)	0–0	(South Africa) Kaizer Chiefs	11 de Novembro, Luanda
17:00 WAT (UTC+1)				Referee: Pacifique Ndabihawenimana; Willy Habimana, Pascal Ndimunzigo (Burundi)
Note: Dominique / Danilson, Diógenes, Matuwila, Pedro / Dany, Dos Santos (substituted off) 76', Ito, Job (c), Picas (substituted off) 77' / Azulão (substituted off) 83' — Lisandro (substituted on) 76', Nelinho (substituted on) 77', Yano (substituted on) 83'

Fri, 05 Mar 2021 R3 1L	Kaizer Chiefs (South Africa)	2–0	(Angola) Petro Atlético	FNB Stadium, Johannesburg
18:00 SAST (UTC+2)	Mathoho 29'; Mashiane 78'	Report
Note: Dominique / Danilson, Diógenes, Matuwila, Pedro / Dany, Ito (substituted off) 90', Job (c) (substituted off) 60', Manguxi (substituted off) 45', Picas (substituted off) 74' / Azulão (substituted off) 74' — Lisandro (substituted on) 45', Tony (substituted on) 60', Yano (substituted on) 74', Nelinho (substituted on) 74', Messias (substituted on) 90'

Tue, 23 Feb 2021 R2 1L	Petro Atlético (Angola)	0–1	(Morocco) Wydad	11 de Novembro, Luanda
14:00 WAT (UTC+1)
Note: Dominique / Diógenes, Matuwila, Pedro, Musah / Além (substituted off) 73', Ito, Job (c) (substituted off) 79', Manguxi (substituted off) 66', Picas / Azulão (substituted off) 66' — Yano (substituted on) 66', Dany (substituted on) 66', Tony (substituted on) 73', Megue (substituted on) 79'

Sat, 13 Feb 2021 R1 1L	Horoya (Guinea)	2–0	(Angola) Petro Atlético	Lansana Conté, Conakry
16:00 UTC (UTC+0)	Nikièma 35' (pen.); Barry 84'			Referee: Beida Damane; Abderahmane Warr, Youssouf Yahia (Mauritania)
Note: Dominique / Diógenes, Ito, Matuwila, Tó Carneiro / Além, Joaquim Adão, Job (c) (substituted off) 82', Manguxi, Picas (substituted off) 86' / Tony (substituted off) 65' — Azulão (substituted on) 65', Pedro (substituted on) 82', Eddie (substituted on) 86'

=== First round ===
Wed, 6 Jan 2021 R1 1L	Petro Atlético (Angola)	1–0	(Zambia) Nkana FC	11 de Novembro, Luanda
17:00 WAT (UTC+1)	Tony 76'			Referee: Eric Castane (Gabon); Urbain Ndong, Felix Eyaga
Note: Dominique / Eddie, Matuwila, Musah, Pedro / Além, Joaquim Adão, Job (c), Picas (substituted off) 90+1' / Azulão (substituted off) 33', Yano (substituted off) 74' — Megue (substituted on) 33', Tony (substituted on) 74', Ito (substituted on) 90+1'

Wed, 23 Dec 2020 R1 1L	Nkana FC (Zambia)	1–1	(Angola) Petro Atlético	Nkana Stadium, Kitwe
16:00 CAT (UTC+2)	Chisala 56'	Report	88' Yano	Referee: Artur Alfinar (Mozambique); Venestâncio Cossa, Osvaldo Jesus
Note: Dominique / Diógenes, Matuwila, Musah, Pedro / Além (substituted off) 62', Dany (substituted off) 70', Ito, Job (c) (substituted off) 63' / Azulão, Picas — Joaquim Adão (substituted on) 62', Tony (substituted on) 63', Yano (substituted on) 70'

=== Preliminary round ===
Sat, 5 Dec 2020 PR 2L	Petro Atlético (Angola)	2–2	(Equatorial Guinea) Akonangui FC	11 de Novembro, Luanda
17:00 WAT (UTC+1)	Azulão 24'; Yano 87'	Report	51', 69' Lolín	Referee: Retselisitsoe Molisie, Lesupi Puputla, M. Mapoho (Lesotho)
Note: Elber / Diógenes (substituted off) 45', Dos Santos (substituted off) 71', Musah, Pedro / Dany (substituted off) 64', Ito, Job (c), Mensah (substituted off) 56' / Azulão, Tony (substituted off) 57' — Eddie (substituted on) 45', Picas (substituted on) 56', Yano (substituted on) 57', Joaquim Adão (substituted on) 64', Megue (substituted on) 71'

Sat, 29 Nov 2020 PR 1L	Akonangui FC (Equatorial Guinea)	0–1	(Angola) Petro Atlético	Estadio de Ebibeyin, Ebibeyin
15:30 WAT (UTC+1)		Report	36' Azulão	Referee: Fitial Kokolo, Beaudrel Roul, Sam Kenzet (Congo)
Note: Elber / Diógenes, Matuwila, Musah, Pedro (substituted off) 76' / Além, Dany, Job (c) (substituted off) 84', Picas / Azulão (substituted off) 84', Tony (substituted off) 72' — Yano (substituted on) 72', Tó Carneiro (substituted on) 76', Megue (substituted on) 84', Dos Santos (substituted on) 84'

=== Results summary ===
Overall								Home						Away					
Pld	W	D	L	GF	GA	GD	Pts	W	D	L	GF	GA	GD	W	D	L	GF	GA	GD
7	2	2	3	5	8	−3	8	1	1	1	3	3	0	1	1	2	2	5	−3

Last updated: 6 March 2021.

== Angola Cup ==
=== Preliminary round ===
Wed, 19 May 2021 PR	Mundo Verde	1–3	Petro de Luanda	Mangueiras, Sumbe
15:00 WAT (UTC+1)	CK 21'		77' Vidinho; 85' Azulão; 87' Maya	Referee: Feliciano Lucas; Alexandre Bengue, Horácio Tchissingui
Note: Elber / Mindinho, Pedro, Tó Carneiro, Vidinho / Dos Santos, Eddie, Manguxi, Megue / Figueira, Picas —

=== Round of 16 ===
Wed, 02 Jun 2021 R16	Petro de Luanda	1–0	Académica do Lobito	11 de Novembro, Luanda
15:00 WAT (UTC+1)	Vidinho 6'
Note: Elber / Eddie, Mindinho, Tó Carneiro, Vidinho / Além, Dos Santos, Megue (substituted off) 64' / Figueira (substituted off) 77', Picas (substituted off) 64', Tony (substituted off) 72' — Job (substituted on) 64', Manguxi (substituted on) 64', Yano (substituted on) 72', Azulão (substituted on) 77'

=== Quarter-finals ===
Sat, 03 Jul 2021 QF	Petro de Luanda	1–0	Recreativo do Libolo	11 de Novembro, Luanda
16:30 WAT (UTC+1)	Vidinho 49'			Referee: Carlos Silva; Manuel Lobe, Alberto Dumbi
Note: Elber / Eddie, Mindinho, Tó Carneiro, Vidinho / Além, Maya (substituted off) 45', Megue (substituted off) 58', Picas (substituted off) 45' / Tony (substituted off) 70', Yano (substituted off) 45' — Job (substituted on) 45', Dany (substituted on) 45', Figueira (substituted on) 45', Azulão (substituted on) 58', Ito (substituted on) 70'

=== Semi-finals ===
Thu, 08 Jul 2021 SF	Petro de Luanda	2–0	1º de Agosto	11 de Novembro, Luanda
16:30 WAT (UTC+1)	Maya 15'; Yano 88'			Referee: José Chitumba; Estanislau Guedes, Rosário Calembela
Note: Elber / Eddie, Mindinho, Tó Carneiro, Vidinho (substituted off) 39' / Além, Job, Maya, Megue (substituted off) 60' / Azulão (substituted on) 76', Picas (substituted off) 75' — Figueira (substituted on) 60', Tony (substituted on) 75', Yano (substituted on) 76', Wilson (substituted on) 45'

=== Final ===
Thu, 15 Jul 2021 F	Petro de Luanda	2–0	Interclube	11 de Novembro, Luanda
16:00 WAT (UTC+1)	Pirolito 12' (o.g.); Figueira 85'	Report		Referee: Nuno Sumbo; Joaquim Chio, Lucas Caliongo
Note: Elber / Eddie, Mindinho, Tó Carneiro, Vidinho / Além, Job (substituted off) 89', Maya, Megue (substituted off) 73' / Azulão (substituted off) 89', Picas (substituted off) 73' — Tony (substituted on) 73', Figueira (substituted on) 73', Dany (substituted on) 89', Yano (substituted on) 89'

== Season statistics ==
=== Appearances ===
As of July 31, 2021

No.	Pos.	Nat.	Name	Girabola		Angola Cup		CAF Champions League		Total	
No.	Pos.	Nat.	Name	Mins	Apps	Mins	Apps	Mins	Apps	Mins	Apps
1	RW	(Angola)	Job	2011	28	250	2(3)	807	10	3068	40(3)
2	LW	(Angola)	Picas	1597	26(4)	347	5	772	9(1)	2716	40(5)
3	FW	(Brazil)	Azulão	1821	23(4)	210	2(3)	671	8(2)	2702	33(9)
4	RB	(Angola)	Diógenes	1577	18(2)	0	0	675	8	2252	26(2)
5	LB	(Angola)	Tó Carneiro	1672	20(1)	450	5	104	1(1)	2226	26(2)
6	CB	(Angola)	Mindinho	1440	18	450	5	180	2	2070	25
7	DM	(Angola)	Ito	1339	16	20	(1)	674	8(1)	2033	24(2)
8	DM	(Angola)	Além	1128	16(3)	360	4	495	6(1)	1983	26(4)
9	GK	(Angola)	Élber	1350	17	450	5	180	2	1980	24
10	GK	(Angola)	Dominique	1080	13	0	0	720	8	1800	21
11	LB	(Angola)	Pedro	784	10	90	1	804	9(1)	1678	20(1)
12	CB	(Angola)	Vidinho	1134	14(1)	399	5			1533	19(1)
13	CM	(Angola)	Dany	973	12(4)	46	(2)	473	6(1)	1492	18(7)
14	CB	(Angola)	Matuwila	810	10	0	0	630	7	1440	17
15	LW	(Angola)	Megue	972	14(8)	345	5	98	(5)	1415	20(3)
16	LW	(Angola)	Maya	1139	15	225	3(2)			1364	18(2)
17	RB	(Angola)	Eddie	730	10(3)	450	5	139	1(2)	1319	16(5)
18	FW	(Angola)	Yano	909	9(11)	78	1(2)	281	2(7)	1268	13
19	CB	(Ghana)	Musah	697	9	0	0	450	5	1147	14
20	CM	(Angola)	Manguxi	667	7(7)	116	1(1)	307	4(1)	1090	12(9)
21	FW	(Brazil)	Tony	514	3(15)	174	2(1)	254	3(4)	942	8(20)
22	LW	(Angola)	Dos Santos	495	5(6)	180	2	153	2(1)	828	9(7)
23	CB	(Angola)	Danilson	396	5	0	0	360	4	756	9
24	CB	(Angola)	Figueira	344	(14)	259	2(3)			603	2(44)
25	RW	(Ghana)	Mensah	455	6(4)	0	(1)	95	1(2)	550	7(7)
26	DM	(Angola)	Joaquim Adão	185	2(5)	0	0	234	2(2)	419	4(7)
27	CB	(Angola)	Messias	180	2			120	1(1)	300	3(1)
28	CB	(Angola)	Lisandro	93	1(2)			194	1(3)	287	2(5)
29	RW	(Brazil)	Maikon	102	1(4)					102	1(4)
30	CB	(Angola)	Wilson	22	(1)	45	(1)			67	(2)
31	CB	(Angola)	Nelinho	93	1(2)			194	1(3)	287	2(5)
32	CB	(Angola)	Joy	93	1(2)			194	1(3)	287	2(5)

=== Scorers ===
As of July 31, 2021

P	Pos.	Nat.	Name	Girabola		Angola Cup		CAF Champions League		Total	
P	Pos.	Nat.	Name	Mins	Gls	Mins	Gls	Mins	Gls	Mins	Gls
1	FW	(Brazil)	Azulão	1821	16	210	1	671	2	2702	19
2	FW	(Angola)	Yano	909	4	78	1	281	2	1268	7
3	MF	(Angola)	Picas	1597	7	347	0	772	0	2716	7
4	MF	(Angola)	Job	2011	7	250	0	807	0	3068	7
5	MF	(Angola)	Megue	972	4	345	0	98	0	1415	4
6	MF	(Angola)	Vidinho	1134	1	399	3	0	0	1533	4
7	MF	(Brazil)	Tony	514	2	174	0	254	1	942	3
8	MF	(Ghana)	Mensah	455	2	0	0	95	0	550	2
9	MF	(Angola)	Figueira	344	1	259	1	95	0	603	2
10	MF	(Angola)	Maya	1139	0	225	2			1364	2
11	MF	(Angola)	Manguxi	667	1	116	0	307	0	1090	1
12	MF	(Angola)	Dany	973	1	46	0	473	0	1492	1
Opponents					1		1		0		2
Total					47		8		5		61

=== Assists ===
As of 13 February 2021

P	Pos.	Nat.	Name	Girabola		Angola Cup		CAF Champions League		Total	
P	Pos.	Nat.	Name	Apps	Asts	Apps	Asts	Apps	Asts	Apps	Asts
1	MF	(Angola)	Job	8	5	0	0	5	1	13	6
2	MF	(Brazil)	Tony	1(4)	1	0	0	3(2)	1	4(6)	2
3	MF	(Angola)	Picas	6(3)	1	0	0	4(1)	1	10(4)	2
4	DF	(Angola)	Kelson	(1)	1	0	0	0	0	(1)	1
5	MF	(Brazil)	Maikon	1(2)	1	0	0	0	0	1(2)	1
6	DF	(Angola)	Eddie	4(3)	0	0	0	1(2)	1	5(5)	1
7	DF	(Angola)	Pedro	3	0	0	0	4(1)	1	7(1)	1
8	DF	(Angola)	Yano	7	1	0	0	1(3)	0	8(3)	1
9	FW	(Brazil)	Azulão	4(3)	1	0	0	4(1)	0	8(4)	1
Total					11		0		5		16

=== Clean sheets ===
As of 13 February 2021

P	Pos.	Nat.	Name	Girabola		Angola Cup		CAF Champions League		Total	
P	Pos.	Nat.	Name	Apps	CS	Apps	CS	Apps	CS	Apps	CS
1	GK	(Angola)	Dominique	9	4	0	0	3	1	11	5
2	GK	(Angola)	Elber	0	0	0	0	2	1	2	1
Total					4		–		2		6

=== Disciplinary record ===
As of 13 February 2021

P	Pos.	Nat.	Name	Girabola			Angola Cup			CAF Champions League			Total		
P	Pos.	Nat.	Name	Yellow card	Double yellow card	Red card	Yellow card	Double yellow card	Red card	Yellow card	Double yellow card	Red card	Yellow card	Double yellow card	Red card
1	MF	(Angola)	Job	1		1				1			2		1
2	MF	(Angola)	Joaquim Adão							1	1		1	1	
3	MF	(Angola)	Ito	3						1			4		
4	MF	(Angola)	Além	1						1			2		
4	MF	(Angola)	Manguxi	2									2		
4	DF	(Angola)	Pedro	1						1			2		
4	MF	(Angola)	Picas	2									2		
4	MF	(Angola)	Yano	2									2		
5	DF	(Angola)	Diógenes	1									1		
5	DF	(Angola)	Matuwila	1									1		
5	MF	(Ghana)	Mensah	1									1		
5	DF	(Ghana)	Musah	1									1		
5	DF	(Angola)	Tó Carneiro	1									1		
5	MF	(Brazil)	Tony							1			1		
Total				17		1				6	1		23	1	1

=== Season progress ===
29/11	5/12	22/12	28/12	2/1	6/1	12/1	17/1	20/1	24/1	30/1	3/2	7/2	13/2	17/2	20/2	23/2	6/3	16/3
AKO	AKO	NKA	MAQ	LIB	NKA	BAI	SRC	INT	WIL	CAA	PRO	PRI	HOR	SCC	FER	WYD	KAI	KAI
0–1	2–2	1–1	3–1	0–3	1–0	5–1	1–0	1–0	0–3	0–0	2–3	1–0	2–0	3–0	3–0	0–1	0–2	
Champions			GB		CH	Girabola							CH	Girabola		ChampionsCH		

== See also ==
- List of Atlético Petróleos de Luanda players
