= Prime Minister Itō =

Prime Minister Itō may refer to one of the following Prime Ministers of Japan:

- Masayoshi Ito (伊東 正義, 1913–1994), Japanese politician
- Itō Hirobumi (伊藤 博文, 1841–1909), Japanese career officer and cabinet minister

== See also ==
- Ito (disambiguation)
- Masayoshi
