= Masayoshi =

- Gender: Male

Origin
- Origin: Japanese
- Meaning: Different meanings depending on the kanji used

Masayoshi is a masculine Japanese given name.

== Written forms ==
Masayoshi can be written using different kanji characters and can mean:

- 正由, "correct, justice, righteous; wherefore, a reason"
- 正義, "correct, justice, righteous; righteousness, justice, morality, honor, loyalty, meaning"
- 正喜, "correct, justice, righteous; rejoice, take pleasure in"
- 正睦, "correct, justice, righteous; intimate, friendly, harmonious"
- 正淑, "correct, justice, righteous; graceful, gentle, pure"
- 正吉, "correct, justice, righteous; good luck, joy, congratulations"
- 正芳, "correct, justice, righteous; perfume, balmy, favorable, fragrant"
- 昌良, "prosperous, bright, clear; good, pleasing, skilled"
- 昌義, "prosperous, bright, clear; righteousness, justice, morality, honor, loyalty, meaning"
- 昌臧, "prosperous, bright, clear; good, bribe, servant"
- 雅宜, "gracious, elegant, graceful, refined; best regards, good"
- 雅祥, "gracious, elegant, graceful, refined; auspicious, happiness, blessedness, good omen, good fortune"
- 雅賢, "gracious, elegant, graceful, refined; intelligent, wise, wisdom, cleverness"
- 聖義, "holy, saint, sage, master, priest; righteousness, justice, morality, honor, loyalty, meaning"
- 政義, "politics, government; righteousness, justice, morality, honor, loyalty, meaning"
- 方義, "direction, person, alternative; righteousness, justice, morality, honor, loyalty, meaning"
- 将義, "leader, commander, general, admiral, or, and again, soon, from now on, just about; righteousness, justice, morality, honor, loyalty, meaning"
- 優好, "tenderness, excel, surpass, actor, superiority, gentleness; fond, pleasing, like something"
- 匡良, "correct, save, assist; good, pleasing, skilled"

The name can also be written in hiragana (まさよし) or katakana (マサヨシ).

== People with the name ==
- Abe Masayoshi (阿部 正由; 1769 – 1808), Japanese daimyō
- Masayoshi Ebina (蛯名 正義; born 1969), Japanese jockey
- Masayoshi Esashi (江刺 正喜; born 1949), Japanese engineer
- Masayoshi Hamada (浜田 昌良; born 1957), Japanese politician
- Masayoshi Haneda (羽田 昌義; born 1976), Japanese actor
- Hotta Masayoshi (堀田 正睦; 1810 – 1864), Japanese Rōjū
- Masayoshi Ito (伊東 正義; 1913 – 1994), Japanese politician
- Masayoshi "Mabo" Kabe (加部 正義; born 1949), Japanese-French musician
- Masayoshi Kan (簡 優好; born 1972), Japanese sprinter
- Masayoshi Kato (加藤 政義; born 1987), Japanese baseball player
- Kanematsu Masayoshi (兼松 正吉; 1542 – 1627), Japanese samurai
- Kurimoto Masayoshi (栗本 昌臧; 1756 – 1834), Japanese entomologist
- Masayoshi Manabe (真鍋 政義; born 1963), Japanese volleyball player
- Matsukata Masayoshi (松方 正義; 1835 – 1924), Japanese politician
- Masayoshi Motegi (茂木 正淑; born 1962), Japanese professional wrestler
- Masayoshi Nagata (永田 雅宜; 1927 – 2008), Japanese mathematician
- Masayoshi Namiki (並木 正芳; born 1949), Japanese politician
- Masayoshi Nataniya (那谷屋 正義; born 1957), Japanese politician
- Masayoshi Okada (岡田 正義; born 1958), Japanese football referee
- Masayoshi Ōhira (大平 正芳; 1910 – 1980), Japanese politician
- Masayoshi Ōishi (大石 昌良; born 1980), Japanese musician
- Masayoshi Oshikawa (押川 方義; 1850–1928), Japanese Protestant missionary and educator
- Ryūhō Masayoshi (琉鵬 正吉; born 1977), Japanese sumo wrestler
- Satake Masayoshi (佐竹 昌義; 1081 – 1147), Japanese samurai
- Masayoshi Shimizu (清水 聖義; born 1941), Japanese politician
- Masayoshi Soken (祖堅 正慶; born 1975), Japanese video game composer
- Masayoshi Son (孫正義; born 1957), Korean-Japanese businessman
- Masayoshi Takanaka (高中 正義; born 1953), Japanese guitarist
- Masayoshi Takemura (武村 正義; born 1934), Japanese politician
- Masayoshi Toyoda (豊田 正義; born 1966), Japanese journalist
- Masayoshi Urabe (浦邊 雅祥; born 1965), Japanese musician
- Masayoshi Watanabe (渡邉 正義; born 1954), Japanese chemist
- Masayoshi Yamaguchi (山口 正義; born 1947), Japanese professor
- Masayoshi Yamamoto (山本 雅賢), Japanese artistic gymnast
- Masayoshi Yamashita (山下 昌良; born 1961), Japanese bass guitarist
- Masayoshi Yamazaki (山崎 まさよし / 山崎 将義; born 1971), Japanese musician
- Masayoshi Yoshino (吉野 正芳; born 1948), Japanese politician
