= Ito =

Ito, Itō or Itoh may refer to:

== Places ==
- Ito Island, an island of Milne Bay Province, Papua New Guinea
- Ito Airport, an airport in the Democratic Republic of the Congo
- Ito District, Wakayama, a district located in Wakayama Prefecture, Japan
- Itō, Shizuoka, a Japanese city

== People ==
- Itō (surname), for people with the Japanese surname Itō
- Hiroshi Ito (糸 博; born 1933), Japanese voice actor
- Kiyosi Itô (1915–2008), Japanese mathematician
- Princess Ito (died 861), Japanese imperial princess
- Ito Giani (1941–2018), Italian sprinter
- Ito (footballer, born 1961), full name Andrés Alonso García, Spanish footballer
- Ito (footballer, born 1975), full name Antonio Álvarez Pérez, Spanish footballer
- Ito (footballer, born 1992), full name Jorge Delgado Fidalgo, Spanish footballer
- Ito (footballer, born 1994), full name Mario Manuel de Oliveira, Angolan footballer
- Ito Ohno (大野 いと; born 1995), Japanese fashion model and actress
- Ito Smith (born 1995), American football player
- Ito Curata (1959–2020), Filipino fashion designer
- Ito Morabito (born 1977), French designer
- Ito Ogawa (born 1973), Japanese novelist, lyricist, and translator

== Other uses ==
- Ito language, an Ibibio-Efik language of eastern Nigeria
- Itoh peony, a hybrid plant in genus Paeonia
- Indium tin oxide (ITO), a transparent thin film conductor
- I_{to1}, an abbreviation of cardiac transient outward potassium current
- Ito: A Diary of an Urban Priest, a 2010 documentary film by Pirjo Honkasalo

== See also ==
- Ito cell, a fat-storing cell found in the liver; also called a hepatic stellate cell
- Ito-toren, an office building in Amsterdam
- Itô calculus
- Itô's lemma, used in stochastic calculus
- Itoh–Tsujii inversion algorithm, in field theory
- in Spanish, diminitives are formed by appending -ito to masculine words
- ITO (disambiguation)
