= Masayoshi Yamaguchi =

Japanese scientist

- 山口 正義
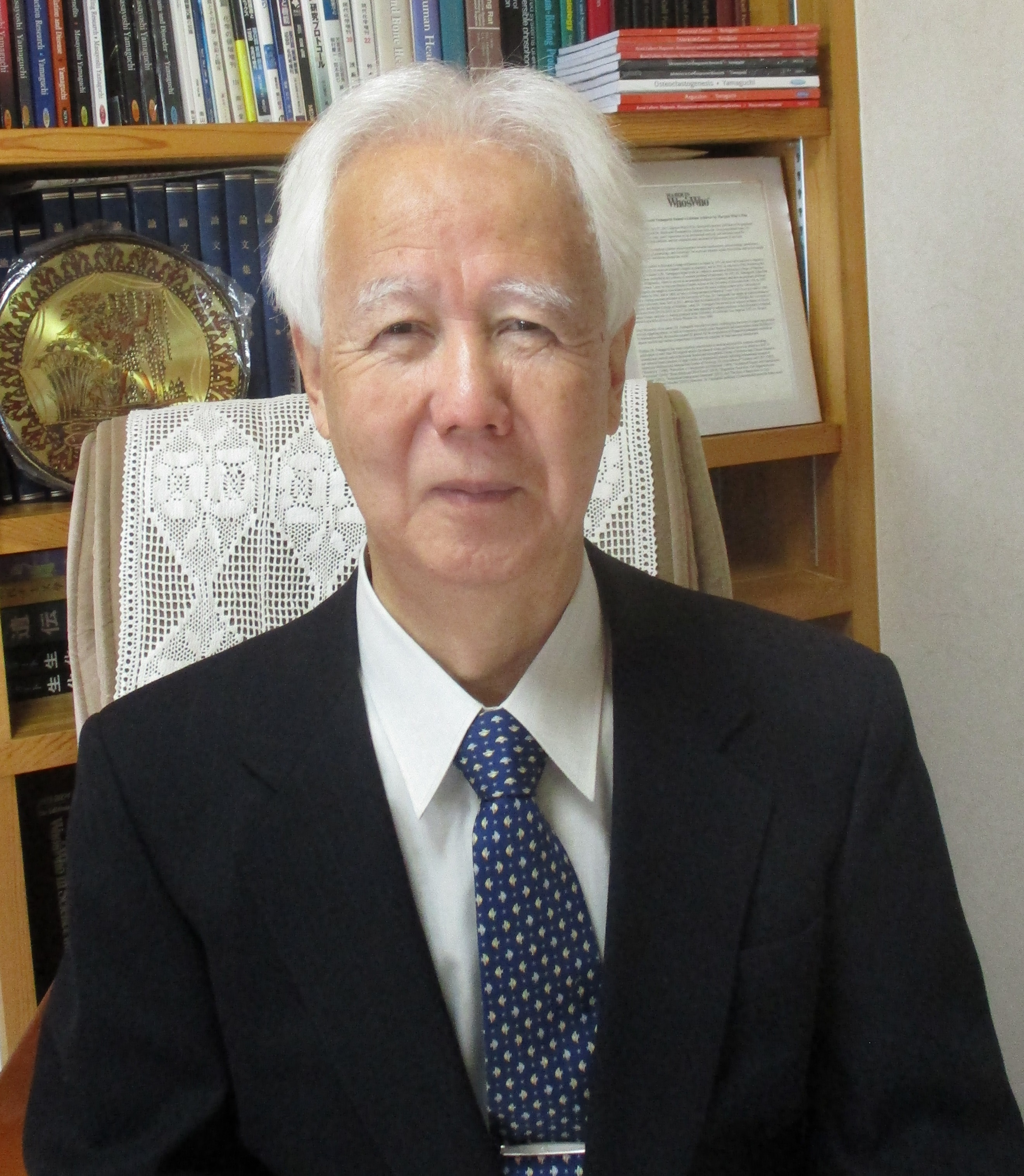
- Born: 1947 (age 78–79); Atami, Japan
- Education: B.S., Pharmaceutical Sciences; M.S., Pharmaceutical Sciences; Ph.D., Pharmaceutical Sciences
- Alma mater: Shizuoka College of Pharmacy, University of Shizuoka
- Scientific career
- Workplaces: University of Shizuoka Graduate School; Emory University School of Medicine; University of Hawaii Cancer Center, University of Hawaii at Manoa (UH)

Masayoshi Yamaguchi (Japanese: 山口 正義, born 1947) is a biomedical scientist and researcher, most known for his contributions to biomedical fields including biochemistry, endocrinology, metabolism, nutrition, pharmacology, and toxicology. He is a full professor in the Cancer Biology Program at the University of Hawaii Cancer Center, University of Hawaii at Manoa (UH), focusing on research in bone and calcium endocrinology, metabolism, cell calcium signaling, gene regulation, dietary prevention of osteoporosis, carcinogenesis, and cancer therapy.

Yamaguchi discovered the novel protein and genes named Regucalcin and RGPR-p117, respectively. He holds over 25 patents, has published over 600 papers and review articles, is the author of four books, and has edited an additional 16 books He is the Co Editor-in-Chief for Current Cancer Drug Targets , and Founding Editor-in-Chief for Current Cell Science.

== Early life and education ==
Born in 1947 in Atami, Japan, Yamaguchi developed an early interest in the field of pharmaceutical sciences. He studied at Shizuoka College of Pharmacy, where he completed his Bachelor of Science (B.S.) in Pharmaceutical Sciences, graduating in 1971. He then continued his studies in the Graduate School of Pharmaceutical Sciences, earning his Master of Science (M.S.) degree in 1973 and pursued doctoral studies, receiving his Ph.D. in Pharmaceutical Sciences from Shizuoka College of Pharmacy in 1976.

== Career ==
After obtaining his Ph.D., Yamaguchi commenced his career as a Research Associate and subsequently an assistant professor at Shizuoka College of Pharmacy, positions he held from 1973 to 1987. His career then progressed through various academic ranks in different institutions, ultimately leading to his role as a professor at the University of Shizuoka Graduate School of Nutritional Sciences from 1993 to 2007. Previously, he was an Associate Professor (1991-1993) and, earlier, an Assistant Professor (1987-1991) in the School of Pharmaceutical Sciences at the same institution. A move to the United States in 2007 marked an expansion of his research activities at several U.S. institutions, including the Emory University School of Medicine, Baylor College of Medicine (BCM), the University of California, Los Angeles (UCLA), School of Medicine, and the University of Hawaii Cancer Center, UH.

From 2007 to 2011, Yamaguchi was a visiting professor in the Division of Endocrinology and Metabolism and Lipids in the Department of Medicine at Emory University School of Medicine in GA, USA. He worked in the Department of Foods and Nutrition at the University of Georgia from 2011 to 2012, and in the same year, he was a visiting professor in the Department of Pathobiology at the University of Missouri-Columbia's College of Veterinary Medicine. From 2012 to 2013, he held an appointment as a visiting professor in the Division of Diabetes, Endocrinology, and Metabolism, Department of Medicine at BCM in Houston, TX; as an adjunct professor in the Department of Hematology and Medical Oncology at Emory University School of Medicine from 2013 to 2016; and as a visiting professor in the Department of Pathology and Laboratory Medicine, David Geffen School of Medicine at UCLA, from 2016 to 2019. From 2019 to 2021, he served as an adjunct professor in the University of Hawaii Cancer Center at University of Hawaii at Manoa, and has been serving as full professor at the same institute since 2021.

In July 1981, Yamaguchi was presented with the Award for Academy Encouragement in Tokai Branch of the Pharmaceutical Society of Japan for his contributions to the field. Over the years, he has been the recipient of numerous awards from institutions in Japan, including the Bounty of Takeda Science Promotion Foundation in October 1987, and the Prize for Sato Memorial Foundation in March 1992. He was honored as International Scientist of the Year in 2004, followed by a series of awards such as The IBC Lifetime Achievement Award and The Outstanding Professional Award. In subsequent years, he continued to receive awards including the Senji Miyata Foundation Award 2005 and The Distinguished Service to Science Award. He was appointed as Advisory Board Member in the USERN (Universal Scientific Education and Research Network) in 2021, and achieved full membership in Sigma Xi on December 7, 2022.

== Research ==
Throughout his career, Yamaguchi has made advances in the realm of medical and biological research, particularly in cellular biology and oncology. His work spans numerous topics, with an emphasis on exploring the role of various molecules, such as regucalcin, in cell regulation and cancer biology, resulting in a variety of publications covering biochemistry, cell biology, oncology, biomedical sciences, and osteoporosis treatment. His research articles, published in journals, include studies exploring the molecular intricacies of cellular signaling, cellular proliferation, and the regulatory roles of various molecules in these processes.

=== Early research ===
Yamaguchi's early research focused primarily on calcium signaling and the related molecule, regucalcin. He explored its regulatory role in intracellular calcium ion concentrations, considering its applications and implications in various physiological and pathological conditions, including osteoporosis, diabetes, obesity, neurodegenerative diseases, and cancer.

Yamaguchi conducted a series of studies investigating regucalcin, discovered by him in 1978, and its effects on cellular processes, demonstrating its role in inhibiting cell proliferation, migration, and invasion in diverse cell lines. His work shed light on how regucalcin confers resistance to amyloid-β toxicity in neuronally differentiated cells, and how its overexpression could suppress the growth of various human cancer cell types, including liver cancer, lung cancer, breast cancer, pancreatic cancer, colon cancer, kidney cancer, osteosarcoma, and ovarian cancer.

=== Discovery of RGPR-p117 ===
Yamaguchi originally discovered the RGPR-p117 gene, named as a transcription factor that specifically binds to a nuclear factor I (NFI) consensus motif TTGGC(N)6CC located in the promoter regions of the regucalcin gene. RGPR-p117 was named as the regucalcin gene promoter region-related protein in 2001; it is located on human chromosome 1q25.2 and consists of 26 exons spanning approximately 4.1 kbp. His research showed that regucalcin plays a critical role as a regulator in various cell signaling pathways and transcriptional activity, maintaining cell homeostasis in various types of cells and tissues, including human cancers, suggesting that RGPR-p117 may play a diverse role in cell regulation through its involvement in the expression of regucalcin.

=== Correlation with cancer prognosis ===
One of Yamaguchi's research area has been understanding the implications of regucalcin expression in cancer prognosis. His studies elucidated that increased expression of regucalcin in tumor tissue correlates with prolonged survival in several cancers, including liver cancer, pancreatic cancer, colorectal cancer, lung cancer, kidney cancer, breast cancer, and prostate cancer.

=== Osteogenic factors and osteoporosis prevention ===
Yamaguchi looked into various osteogenic factors found in nutritional and functional foods, considering them significant in the prevention and treatment of osteoporosis. He found that various natural compounds stimulate osteoblastic bone formation and inhibit osteoclastic bone resorption. Osteogenic factors found by his research included zinc and its chelating peptide, isoflavones (genistein and daidzein), menaquinone-7 (vitamin K2), carotenoid (β-cryptoxantine), β-caryophyllene, and marine algae Sargassum horneri component.

=== Inflammation and cytokine regulation ===
Yamaguchi's research delved into exploring molecules that could regulate inflammatory cytokine production. His work explored the regulatory impact of various substances, such as catechin, baicalin, β-caryophyllene, and metaxalone on inflammatory cytokine production, highlinting their potential therapeutic applications in managing inflammatory conditions.

=== Drug development and cancer therapy ===
Furthering his research into practical applications, Yamaguchi studied molecules and compounds that could potentially inhibit cancer growth and bone metastasis. In this area, his work on UBS109 (curcumin analogue), a molecule being investigated for its ability to inhibit breast cancer metastasis to the lungs, pointed towards potential developments in targeted cancer therapies. Furthermore, he found the suppressive effects of botanical factor p-hydroxycinnamic acid and marine factor 3,5-dihydroxy-4-methoxybenzyl alcohol (DHMBA) on cancer growth and bone metastasis.

=== Exploring signaling pathways in cancer biology ===
In 2023, Yamaguchi's research included an exploration of the signaling pathways involved in cancer cell growth, migration, and death. By examining the interplay between diverse signalling pathways, particularly concerning regucalcin, he has sought to elucidate the molecular mechanisms that underpin cancer progression and identify viable targets for therapeutic intervention.

== Awards and honors ==
- 2004 – Lifetime Achievement Award, International Biographical Centre (IBC)
- 2004 – The World Lifetime Achievement Award, American Biographical Institute (ABI)
- 2006 – The American Medal of Honor Award, ABI
- 2007 - Award of the Japan Society for Biomedical Research on Trace Elements (Japan)
- 2007 – Distinguished Service to Science Award, IBC
- 2022 – International Scientist Awards on Engineering, Science, and Medicine, VDGOOD Professional Association

== Bibliography ==
=== Selected books ===
- Nutritional Factors and Osteoporosis Prevention (2010) ISBN 978-1608769292.
- Regucalcin: Genomics, Cell Regulation and Disease (2012) ISBN 978-1621002598
- Biomedical Osteoporosis Treatment (2013) ISBN 9781628087451
- The Role of Regucalcin in Cell Homeostasis and Disorder (2017) ISBN 978-1536105117

=== Selected articles ===
- Yamaguchi, M., Oishi, H., & Suketa, Y. (1987). Stimulatory effect of zinc on bone formation in tissue culture. Biochemical pharmacology, 36(22), 4007-4012. https://doi.org/10.1016/0006-2952(87)90471-0
- Yamaguchi, M. (2005). Role of regucalcin in maintaining cell homeostasis and function. International journal of molecular medicine, 15(3), 371-389. https://doi.org/10.3892/ijmm.15.3.371.
- Yamaguchi, M. (2009). Novel protein RGPR-p117: its role as the regucalcin gene transcription factor. Molecular and cellular biochemistry, 327, 53-63. https://doi.org/10.1007/s11010-009-0042-4
- Yamaguchi, M. (2010). Role of nutritional zinc in the prevention of osteoporosis. Molecular and cellular biochemistry, 338, 241-254. https://doi.org/10.1007/s11010-009-0358-0
- Yamaguchi, M. (2015). The potential role of regucalcin in kidney cell regulation: Involvement in renal failure. International Journal of Molecular Medicine, 36(5), 1191-1199. https://doi.org/10.3892/ijmm.2015.2343
- Yamaguchi, M. (2023). Regucalcin Is a Potential Regulator in Human Cancer: Aiming to Expand into Cancer Therapy. Cancers, 15(22), 5489. https://doi.org/10.3390/cancers15225489
- Ghanem, N. Z., & Yamaguchi, M. (2024). Regucalcin downregulation in human cancer. Life Sciences, 122448. http://doi:10.1016/j.lfs.2024.122448
