= Kanematsu =

Kanematsu (written: 兼松) is both a Japanese surname and a masculine Japanese given name. Notable people with the name include:

== Surname ==
- Kanematsu Masayoshi (兼松 正吉; 1542–1627), Japanese samurai
- Yuka Kanematsu (兼松 由香; born 1982), Japanese rugby sevens player

== Given name ==
- Kanematsu Sugiura (杉浦 兼松; 1890–1979), cancer researcher
- Kanematsu Yamada (山田 兼松; 1903–1977), Japanese long-distance runner
