= Rgn =

RGN or Rgn may refer to:

- RGN, a human gene which codes for the protein regucalcin
- RGN hand grenade, a Soviet weapon
- Registered General Nurse, in the United Kingdom
- Revolutionary Government of Nagaland, in India
- rgn, ISO 639-3 language code for the Romagnol language
- RGN, IATA code for Yangon International Airport in Myanmar
