= Junko Ogata =

Japanese serial killer

- Born: Junko Ogata; 25 February 1962 (age 64); Kurume, Fukuoka Prefecture, Japan
- Convictions: Murder (6 counts); Manslaughter
- Penalty: Death; commuted to life imprisonment

Details
- Victims: 7–9
- Span of crimes: 1996–1998
- Country: Japan
- States: Kitakyushu, Fukuoka

Junko Ogata (緒方 純子, Ogata Junko; born February 25, 1962) is a Japanese serial killer who acted as an accomplice to serial killer Futoshi Matsunaga.

== Early life and murders ==
Junko Ogata was born in Kurume, Fukuoka Prefecture, and grew up in a wealthy family. She was Matsunaga's schoolmate in high school, but she did not know him very well, and he transferred to another school. She was originally a gentle person and got a job in a preschool, but changed after she started dating Matsunaga in 1982. Ogata had remained a virgin until she became involved with Matsunaga, but he suspected her of having relationships with other men. During their relationship, she and Matsunaga had two sons.

Matsunaga abused her severely. He insisted that Junko's mother tried to seduce him, so he abused her, but during the trial Junko began to suspect that Matsunaga had raped her mother. He eventually recruited her in his murder spree. She became cruel under his influence. Matsunaga and Ogata killed at least seven people between 1996 and 1998. Their victims included Kumio Toraya, her parents, her sister, her sister's husband and her niece & nephew.

== Arrest and trial ==
Junko Ogata was arrested in March 2002. Japanese writer Masayoshi Toyoda supported her, and created doubt about the trial in his book published in November 2005. When he first tried to meet with her he was not allowed because she was a murderer, but he was eventually allowed to meet her on September 27, 2005.

Ogata was sentenced to die in a Fukuoka district court on September 28, 2005, a sentence she appealed on October 11. The court tried six murders, and her father's death was regarded as manslaughter. On September 26, 2007, the high court in Fukuoka sentenced her to life in prison, rejecting the death penalty. Prosecutors appealed to the Supreme Court, which narrowly upheld the life sentence.

== See also ==
- Futoshi Matsunaga
- List of serial killers by country
- (in Japanese) Japanese Wikipedia entry on the murder case
