= Masayoshi Toyoda =

Japanese journalist and writer

Masayoshi Toyoda (豊田 正義, Toyoda Masayoshi; born 1966) is a Japanese journalist and writer. In 1995, he also became the founder of the Japanese men's liberation organization Men's Lib Tokyo.

After his graduation from Waseda University, he went to New York City and worked as a reporter. He wrote books about domestic violence and child abuse in Japan. He leads men's liberation in Tokyo now.

Toyoda also complained about the "Yellow cab" controversy.

He wrote a book about serial killer Futoshi Matsunaga and his common-law wife Junko Ogata because their relationships seemed to be domestic violence.

== Books ==
- Toyoda, Masayoshi (June 16, 2009). Hitori Bocchi Iijima Ai 36 Nen no Kiseki (独りぼっち 飯島愛 36年の軌跡, Hitori Bocchi Iijima Ai Sanjū Roku Nen no Kiseki) (Kodansha) ISBN 978-4-06-215529-8
