= ITO =

ITO may refer to:

- Hilo International Airport, IATA airport code
- Indium tin oxide, a transparent conductor
- Information Technology Outsourcing
- International Trade Organization
- Inventory turnover, a measure of the number of times inventory is sold or used in a certain period of time
- Involuntary Treatment Order, typically for psychiatric treatment
- Initial token offering
- Income Tax Office metro station, Delhi, India
- Income Tax Office (BKC) metro station, Mumbai, India
- Jewish Territorial Organization, known as ITO in English, an early 20th century attempt to find a Jewish homeland other than Palestine

== See also ==
- Ito (disambiguation)
- ITO barrage, on the Yamuna River, India
