= Ito Airport =

Airport serving Ito, Democratic Republic of the Congo

- IATA: none; ICAO: FZCU

Summary
- Serves: Ito, Democratic Republic of the Congo
- Elevation AMSL: 350 m (1,150 ft)
- Coordinates: 03°20′S 017°28′E

Map
- Location of airport in the Democratic Republic of the Congo
- Source: Great Circle Mapper

Ito Airport (ICAO: FZCU) is an airport serving Ito, Democratic Republic of the Congo.
