= José-Junior Matuwila =

German-Angolan footballer

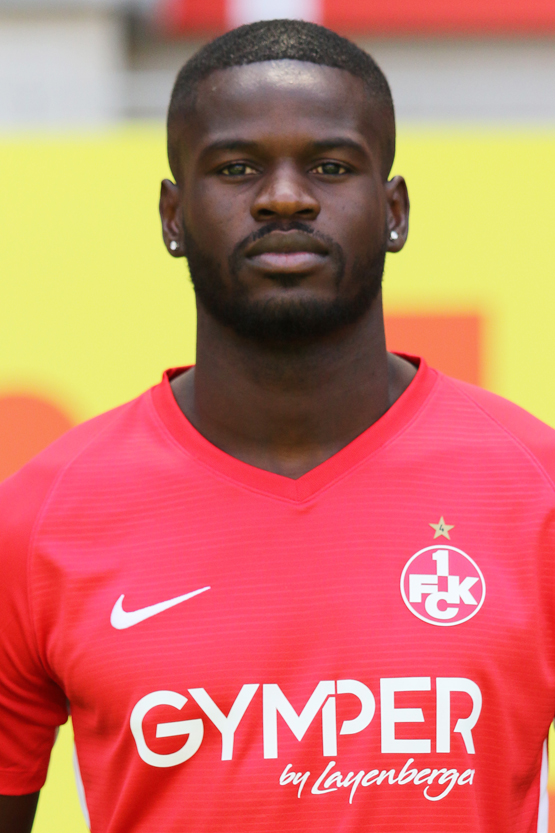
- Matuwila with 1. FC Kaiserslautern in July 2019

Personal information
- Date of birth: 20 September 1991 (age 35)
- Place of birth: Bonn, Germany
- Height: 1.86 m (6 ft 1 in)
- Position: Centre-back

Team information
- Current team: FSV Frankfurt
- Number: 5

Youth career
- –2007: TuS Mayen
- 2007–2010: TuS Koblenz

Senior career*
Years	Team	Apps	(Gls)
2010–2012	TuS Koblenz II	28	(1)
2010	→ Eintracht Lahnstein (loan)	6	(2)
2011	→ TuS Mayen (loan)		
2012–2014	TuS Erndtebrück	45	(3)
2014–2016	TuS Koblenz	45	(2)
2014	TuS Koblenz II	4	(0)
2016–2019	Energie Cottbus	93	(3)
2019–2020	1. FC Kaiserslautern	10	(0)
2020	→ Rot-Weiss Essen (loan)	2	(0)
2020–2022	Petro de Luanda	10	(0)
2022–2023	FC 08 Homburg	24	(4)
2023–	FSV Frankfurt	22	(1)

International career^{‡}
2020–	Angola	3	(0)
- * Club domestic league appearances and goals as of 30 April 2024 ‡ National team caps and goals as of 17 November 2020

José-Junior Matuwila (born 20 September 1991) is a professional footballer who plays as a centre-back for FSV Frankfurt. Born in Germany, Matuwila represents the Angola national team.

== International career ==
On 22 September 2020, Matuwila was called up by the senior Angola national football team. Matuwila debuted or Angola in a 3-0 friendly win over Mozambique on 23 October 2020.
