= SEC16B =

Protein-coding gene in humans

Identifiers
- Aliases: SEC16B, LZTR2, PGPR-p117, RGPR, SEC16S, SEC16 homolog B, endoplasmic reticulum export factor, RGPR-p117
- External IDs: OMIM: 612855; MGI: 2148802; GeneCards: SEC16B

Gene location (Human)
Chr.	Chromosome 1 (human)
Band	1q25.2	Start	177,923,956 bp
Band	1q25.2	End	177,984,303 bp

Gene location (Mouse)
Chr.	Chromosome 1 (mouse)
Band	1|1 H1	Start	157,334,298 bp
Band	1|1 H1	End	157,395,995 bp
RNA expression pattern
Bgee	Human / Mouse (ortholog); Top expressed in: right lobe of liver; body of pancreas; body of stomach; sural nerve; mucosa of transverse colon; apex of heart; Brodmann area 9; right adrenal cortex; right frontal lobe; anterior pituitary / Top expressed in: left lobe of liver; epithelium of small intestine; muscle of thorax; intestinal villus; duodenum; jejunum; parotid gland; mandibular molars; lesser wing of sphenoid bone; islet of Langerhans; More reference expression data
BioGPS	n/a
Gene ontology
Molecular function	protein binding
Cellular component	cytosol; Golgi apparatus; endoplasmic reticulum membrane; intracellular membrane-bounded organelle; membrane; Golgi membrane; endoplasmic reticulum; ER to Golgi transport vesicle membrane; endoplasmic reticulum exit site
Biological process	peroxisome organization; endoplasmic reticulum organization; peroxisome fission; COPII vesicle coating; positive regulation of gene expression; protein transport; vesicle-mediated transport; positive regulation of protein exit from endoplasmic reticulum; Golgi organization; protein localization to endoplasmic reticulum exit site; endoplasmic reticulum to Golgi vesicle-mediated transport
Sources:Amigo / QuickGO
Orthologs
Databases	NCBI: entry; OMA: entry
Species	Human	Mouse
Entrez	89866	89867
Ensembl	ENSG00000120341	ENSMUSG00000026589
UniProt	Q96JE7	Q91XT4
RefSeq (mRNA)	NM_033127; NM_001356499; NM_001356500; NM_001390833; NM_001390834 NM_001390835	NM_001159986; NM_033354
RefSeq (protein)	NP_149118; NP_001343428; NP_001343429	NP_001153458; NP_203505
Location (UCSC)	Chr 1: 177.92 – 177.98 Mb	Chr 1: 157.33 – 157.4 Mb
PubMed search
- Wikidata
View/Edit Human	View/Edit Mouse

Protein transport protein Sec16B also known as regucalcin gene promoter region-related protein p117 (RGPR-p117) and leucine zipper transcription regulator 2 (LZTR2) is a protein that in humans is encoded by the SEC16B gene.

== Discovery ==
RGPR-p117, which was named as a regucalcin gene promoter region-related protein, was originally discovered as a novel transcription factor that specifically binds to a nuclear factor I (NFI) consensus motif TTGGC(N)6CC that is located on the 5'-flanking region of the regucalcin gene (rgn) in 2001. This gene is a highly conserved a leucine zipper motif, and it was also named as the leucine zipper transcription regulator 2 (LZTR2). In 2007, RGPR-p117 was also renamed as Sec16 homologue B (SEC16B), an endoplasmic reticulum export factor.

== Gene ==
The gene consists of 26 exons spanning approximately 4.1 kbp and is localized on human chromosome 1q25.2. This gene expression is stimulated through various signaling factors in cells. RGPR-p117 is present in the plasma membranes, cytoplasm, mitochondria, microsomes and nucleus of the cells. Cytoplasm RGPR-p117 is translocated to nucleus. Phosphorylated RGPR-p117 specifically binds to the TTGGC motif in the promoter region of various genes to enhance the gene expression of various proteins, and plays a crucial role as a transcription factor in the cells.

== Function ==
In the role in the regulation of cell regulation, RGPR-p117 possesses protective effects on apoptotic cell death induced by various signaling factors. Overexpression of RGPR-p117 did not cause an alteration of cell proliferation and led to significant decreases in protein and DNA contents in cloned normal rat kidney proximal tubular epithelial NRK52E cells. It also plays a role as an endoplasmic reticulum export factor to deliver to newly synthesized proteins and lipids to the Golgi. RGPR-p117/SEC16B may be involved in human obesity to possess an association between single nucleotide polymorphisms and different measures of obesity.
