= Joaquim Adão =

Angolan footballer (born 1992)

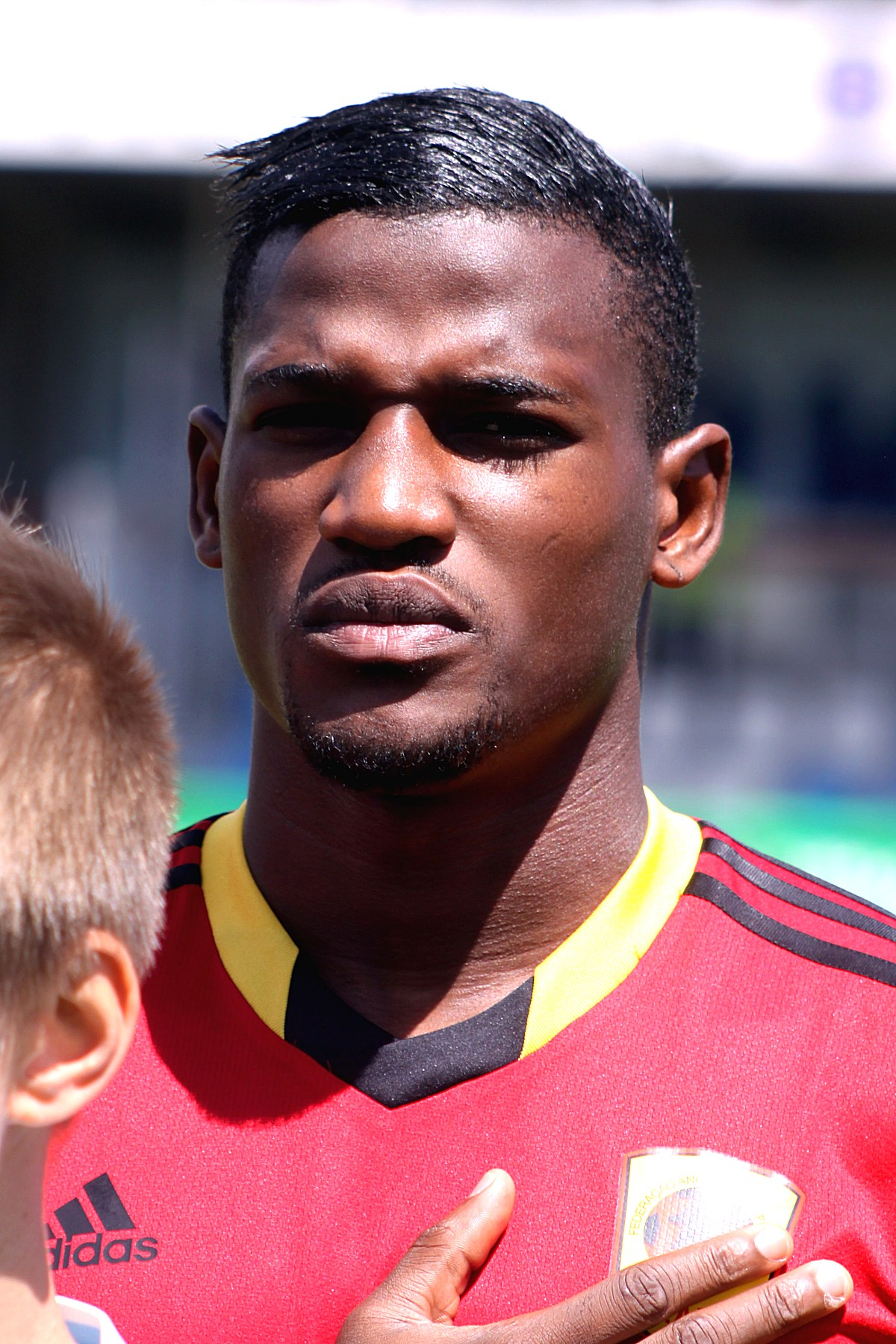
- Adão in 2014

Personal information
- Full name: Joaquim Adão Lungieki João
- Date of birth: 14 July 1992 (age 34)
- Place of birth: Fribourg, Switzerland
- Height: 1.78 m (5 ft 10 in)
- Position: Defensive midfielder

Team information
- Current team: Petro de Luanda
- Number: 6

Youth career
- FC Sion

Senior career*
Years	Team	Apps	(Gls)
2009–2013	FC Sion II	63	(3)
2010–2013	FC Sion	14	(0)
2013	→ FC Chiasso (loan)	13	(0)
2014	Progresso		
2015	Kabuscorp		
2015–2019	FC Sion II	8	(0)
2015–2020	FC Sion	34	(0)
2018	→ Heart of Midlothian (loan)	10	(0)
2020–	Petro de Luanda	8	(0)

International career^{‡}
2014–	Angola	11	(0)
- * Club domestic league appearances and goals as of 20 February 2021 ‡ National team caps and goals as of 16 August 2014

Joaquim Adão Lungieki João (born 14 July 1992) is a Swiss-born Angolan footballer who plays for Petro de Luanda as a defensive midfielder.

== Club career ==
Adão was loaned to Scottish Premiership club Heart of Midlothian in January 2018.

== International career ==
Adão played his first international game for Angola on 5 March 2014, in a 1–1 draw against Mozambique. He was part of the starting lineup and played the entire match.
