= Yano (footballer) =

Angolan footballer

Personal information
- Full name: Adriano Belmiro Duarte Nicolau
- Date of birth: 8 July 1992 (age 34)
- Place of birth: Saurimo, Angola
- Height: 1.80 m (5 ft 11 in)
- Position: Striker

Team information
- Current team: Petro de Luanda
- Number: 28

Youth career
- Kabuscorp

Senior career*
Years	Team	Apps	(Gls)
2012–2019	Progresso do Sambizanga	133	(63)
2020–	Petro de Luanda	88	(34)

International career^{‡}
2012–	Angola	33	(4)
- * Club domestic league appearances and goals as of 23 July 2023 ‡ National team caps and goals as of 7 July 2026

Adriano Belmiro Duarte Nicolau best known for his nickname Yano, is an Angolan footballer who plays as a striker for Angolan premier league side Petro de Luanda.

In 2019–20, he signed in for Petro de Luanda in the Angolan league, the Girabola.

== International career ==
=== International goals ===
Scores and results list Angola's goal tally first.

Goal	Date	Venue	Opponent	Score	Result	Competition
1.	14 November 2012	Estádio António Coimbra da Mota, Estoril, Portugal	Congo	1–0	1–1	Friendly
2.	10 January 2016	Muller Stadium, Johannesburg, South Africa	Zambia	1–0	1–2	Friendly
3.	24 March 2018	Levy Mwanawasa Stadium, Ndola, Zambia	Zimbabwe	2–2	2–2 (4–2 p)	2018 Four Nations Tournament
4.	17 November 2019	Stade de Franceville, Franceville, Gabon	Gabon	1–2	1–2	2021 Africa Cup of Nations qualification
