= Futoshi Matsunaga =

Japanese serial killer (born 1961)

- Born: Futoshi Matsunaga; April 28, 1961 (age 65); Kitakyushu, Fukuoka, Japan
- Status: Incarcerated, currently awaiting execution
- Convictions: Murder (6 counts); Manslaughter
- Penalty: Death

Details
- Victims: 7–9
- Span of crimes: 1996–1998
- Country: Japan
- States: Kitakyushu, Fukuoka
- Date apprehended: 2002

Futoshi Matsunaga (松永 太, Matsunaga Futoshi; born April 28, 1961) is a Japanese serial killer who both defrauded and tortured his victims in what is collectively known as the Kitakyūshū Serial Murder Incident (北九州連続殺人事件). Matsunaga was convicted of six counts of murder and one count of manslaughter between 1996 and 1998 and sentenced to death. He murdered his victims with an accomplice, Junko Ogata, who received a life sentence.

Due to the severity of Matsunaga's crimes, many Japanese media outlets chose not to report the details. The Japan Times reported that prosecutors said the case was without comparison in the criminal history of Japan. Several writers, including Ryūzō Saki, later published the details of the crimes.

== Early life ==
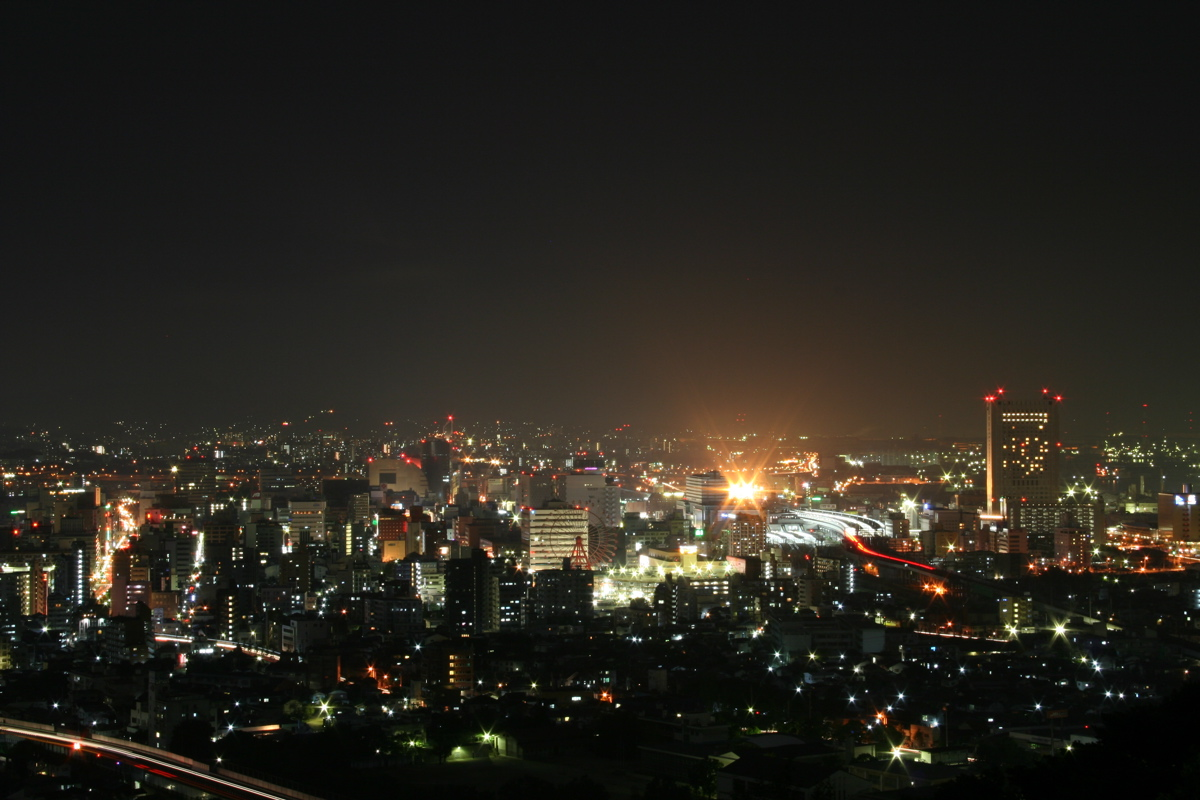
Kokurakita-ku

Futoshi Matsunaga was born in Kokurakita Ward of the city of Kitakyūshū in Fukuoka Prefecture, and grew up in Yanagawa. Matsunaga received good grades in school and had a charming personality, but tended to exhibit disciplinary problems. He was transferred to another high school after engaging in a relationship with a junior high school girl. He married at 19 and had a son.

Despite being married, Matsunaga was involved with at least ten mistresses. In October 1982, during his marriage, he became involved with Junko Ogata, one of his former schoolmates from Yanagawa. In 1984, Matsunaga promised to marry Junko, but her mother, Shizumi Ogata, did not approve of the relationship because of Matsunaga's abuse of her daughter. Matsunaga raped Shizumi as a result. In 1985, Matsunaga convinced Junko that her family hated her because of a suicide attempt and persuaded her to move in with him.

That same year, Matsunaga also purchased a building in which he could operate a futon business. Afterwards, he began to electrically shock employees on the third floor. Matsunaga would sometimes suddenly shout towards other men, saying things like, "There is a spirit behind you! It is sucking away your fortune!" He also made references to religious terms like saṃsāra and kami. By 1992, Matsunaga had stolen 180 million yen (about US$2.2 million) through fraud or blackmail. He and Junko evaded police capture and were put on Japan's most wanted list.

== Murders ==
Matsunaga lived in a condominium in Kokurakita-ku. His first victim was a married woman with three children. In April 1993, he convinced her to leave her husband and run away with him, telling the woman that Junko was his sister. One of her children died under mysterious circumstances in September 1993. Her two other children went to live with their father and grandfather the following month. During their relationship, Matsunaga defrauded the woman for 11.8 million yen (about US$145,510). She died mysteriously in March 1994, and the police were unable to prove that Matsunaga had killed the woman or her child.

Later that year, Matsunaga began victimizing Kumio Toraya and his daughter. Kumio had previously confided to Matsunaga about his previous criminal history; Matsunaga used this information to blackmail Kumio. Kumio and his daughter were held captive in Matsunaga's apartment, where Matsunaga tortured him with electric shocks, forced him to eat his own feces, and forced his daughter to bite her father. Kumio died as a result of this abuse on February 26, 1996. Matsunaga convinced Kumio's daughter that she had murdered her father. He told Junko and the girl to dispose of the remains, which were thrown into the sea near the Kunisaki Peninsula after being pulverized.

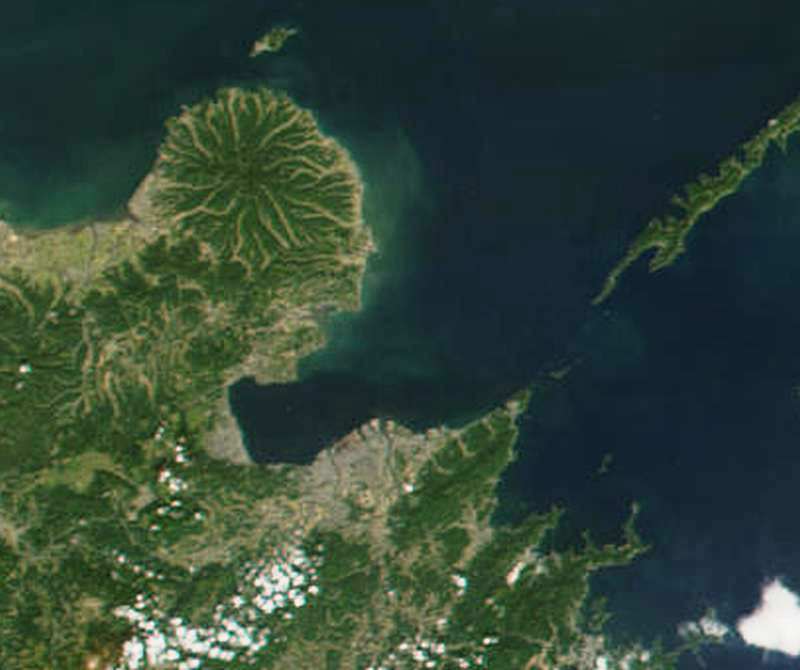
The Kunisaki Peninsula (left) and its surroundings

Soon after, Matsunaga found another target in a female acquaintance of Kumio. He convinced the woman that he was a graduate of Kyoto University and promised to marry her. Instead, he defrauded her of 5.6 million yen (about US$69,066). As before, the woman and her daughter were confined to Matsunaga's apartment. The woman escaped by jumping from the second floor in March 1997. She was put into the care of a mental hospital and her daughter was released.

The following month, Junko left for work and did not return. Matsunaga contacted her family, threatening them and blackmailing Shizumi over the 1985 rape. Matsunaga then faked his own suicide, prompting Junko to return, whereupon she was subjected to continued abuse. He also raped Junko's married sister, Rieko. Junko's family gave 63 million yen (about US$777,116) to Matsunaga, after which he held them captive and psychologically controlled them in ways similar to the methods of cult-leader Shoko Asahara.

On December 21, 1997, Matsunaga coerced Junko to shock her 61-year-old father, Takashige, to the point of death. When Shizumi's mental state began to deteriorate, Matsunaga commanded Rieko and her husband, Kazuya, to strangle her on January 20, 1998. Several weeks later, he commanded Kazuya to strangle Rieko while their 10-year-old daughter, Aya, held her down. Matsunaga and Junko then confined Kazuya to a bathroom, where he starved to death on April 13, 1998. Matsunaga then forced Junko and Aya to kill Rieko's 5-year-old son, Yuki. During the trial, Kumio's daughter testified that Matsunaga and Junko had tortured Aya with electricity. Junko's testimony differed, saying the girl's recollections might have been inaccurate because of guilty feelings about committing her first murder. Kumio's daughter strangled Aya on June 7, 1998. Matsunaga and Junko dismembered and boiled their victims' remains in pots, then finally disposed of them in washrooms or into the sea. Matsunaga blamed the murders on Junko, who, with their two children, were the only survivors in her family.

In July 2000, Matsunaga convinced another woman to go away with him, lured by the prospect of marriage. In August 2001, she gave her twin children to him and Junko. Matsunaga and Junko then convinced the woman to give them 20 million yen (about US$246,580), telling her that they would need the money to bring up her children.

== Arrest and trial ==
Kumio's daughter, who was being held captive, escaped from Matsunaga on January 30, 2002, but Matsunaga found the girl on February 15 and took her back into captivity. He then tortured the girl with electric shocks. On March 6, the girl escaped from Matsunaga again and reported the crimes to the police. She was 17 years old. The police arrested Matsunaga and Junko the next day when they tried to retrieve the girl. The twins and the couple's two children were taken into police protection.

The media initially reported only that Matsunaga and Junko had held their victims captive, similar to the case of Fusako Sano, until details of the couple's murders emerged.

The pair were charged with Aya's murder on September 18, 2002; Takashige's murder on October 12, 2002; Shizumi's murder on December 6, 2002; Yuki's murder on January 11, 2003; Kumio's murder on February 3, 2003; Rieko's murder on February 25, 2003; and Kazuya's murder on May 30, 2003. No murder charges were brought against Kumio's daughter. Junko calmly confessed to her part in the murders, but Matsunaga insisted that the women had fabricated their stories about him. Police never recovered any human remains and found no physical evidence, so they relied primarily upon the testimonies of Kumio's and Junko's daughters during the investigation.

On September 28, 2005, a district court in Fukuoka sentenced Matsunaga and Junko to death by hanging. The court tried six cases, but considered that they had not killed Takashige directly, but had only injured him by electric shocks which later resulted in his death.

The pair appealed the verdict. On September 26, 2007, the Fukuoka High Court upheld Matsunaga's original sentence, but Junko's death sentence was changed to life imprisonment because Matsunaga had exerted control over Junko to force her to kill the victims.

== Victims ==
1. Kumio Toraya (虎谷 久美雄, Toraya Kumio) – The girl's father, 35 year-old, his daughter escaped from Matsunaga again and reported the crimes to the police. She was 17 years old.
2. Takashige Ogata (緒方 誉, Ogata Takashige) – Junko's father, 61 year-old
3. Shizumi Ogata (緒方 静美, Ogata Shizumi) – Junko's mother, 58 year-old
4. Rieko Ogata (緒方 理恵子, Ogata Rieko) – Junko's sister, 33 year-old
5. Kazuya Ogata (緒方 主也, Ogata Kazuya) – Rieko's husband, 38 year-old
6. Yūki Ogata (緒方 優貴, Ogata Yūki) – Junko's nephew, 5 year-old
7. Aya Ogata (緒方 彩, Ogata Aya) – Junko's niece, 10 year-old

== In film ==
In 2019, Sion Sono announced the making of his project The Forest of Love, which is based on Matsunaga's crimes. It was released by Netflix on October 11, 2019.

== See also ==
- Milgram experiment – experiment using electric shocks
- Capital punishment in Japan
- List of serial killers by country
