= Ito (footballer, born 1994) =

Angolan footballer

Personal information
- Full name: Mario Manuel de Oliveira
- Date of birth: 29 November 1994 (age 31)
- Place of birth: Angola
- Height: 1.76 m (5 ft 9 in)
- Position: Defender

Team information
- Current team: Ahed
- Number: 3

Senior career*
Years	Team	Apps	(Gls)
2012–2015	Progresso do Sambizanga	28	(1)
2016–2017	Recreativo do Libolo	32	(0)
2018–2020	Interclube	20	(0)
2020–2023	Atlético Petróleos de Luanda		
2023	Al-Wehdat SC		
2023–2024	Atlético Petróleos de Luanda		
2024–2025	Ahed	24	(1)
2026-	Ahed	2	(1)

International career^{‡}
2012–	Angola	13	(0)
- * Club domestic league appearances and goals as of 2 September 2018 ‡ National team caps and goals as of 3 April 2018

Mario Manuel de Oliveira (born 29 November 1994), better known as just Ito, is an Angolan footballer who plays as a defender for Lebanese Premier League club Ahed.
