= Regucalcin =

Protein-coding gene in the species Homo sapiens

RGN
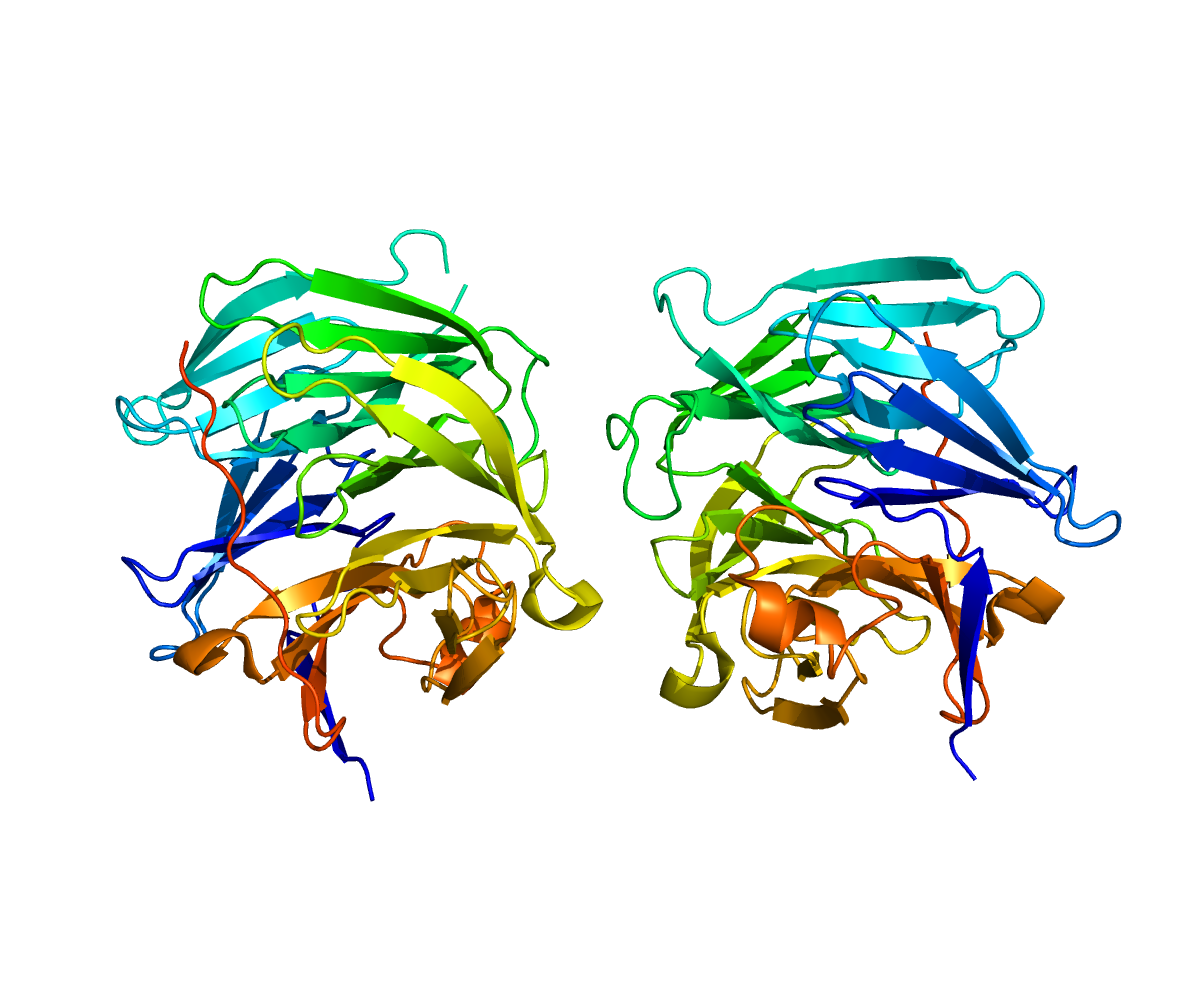

Identifiers
- Aliases: RGN, GNL, HEL-S-41, RC, SMP30, regucalcin
- External IDs: OMIM: 300212; MGI: 108024; GeneCards: RGN
Available structures
PDB	Ortholog search: PDBe RCSB
PDB	List of PDB id codes 3G4E, 3G4H, 4GNB, 4GNC
Enzyme activity
EC #	BRENDA	ExPASy	KEGG	MetaCyc
3.1.1.17	↗	↗	↗	↗

Gene location (Human)
Chr.	X chromosome (human)
Band	Xp11.3	Start	47,078,355 bp
Band	Xp11.3	End	47,093,314 bp

Gene location (Mouse)
Chr.	X chromosome (mouse)
Band	X|X A1.3	Start	20,416,026 bp
Band	X|X A1.3	End	20,428,328 bp
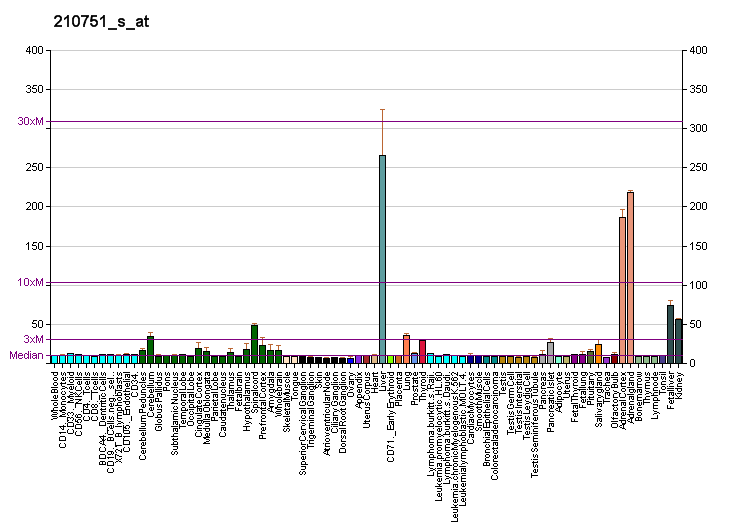
RNA expression pattern
Bgee	Human / Mouse (ortholog); Top expressed in: right adrenal cortex; left adrenal gland; left adrenal cortex; right lobe of liver; kidney tubule; human kidney; body of pancreas; jejunal mucosa; right lung; cerebellar hemisphere / Top expressed in: left lobe of liver; gallbladder; primary oocyte; migratory enteric neural crest cell; fetal liver hematopoietic progenitor cell; zygote; secondary oocyte; human fetus; sexually immature organism; blastocyst; More reference expression data
BioGPS	More reference expression data
Gene ontology
Molecular function	calcium ion binding; gluconolactonase activity; zinc ion binding; enzyme regulator activity; metal ion binding; hydrolase activity
Cellular component	cytoplasm; cytosol; nucleus; extracellular region
Biological process	negative regulation of protein phosphorylation; positive regulation of triglyceride biosynthetic process; positive regulation of ATP-dependent activity; negative regulation of protein kinase activity; kidney development; negative regulation of flagellated sperm motility; ageing; positive regulation of proteolysis involved in cellular protein catabolic process; cellular calcium ion homeostasis; negative regulation of apoptotic process; positive regulation of glucose metabolic process; positive regulation of fatty acid biosynthetic process; negative regulation of bone development; positive regulation of dUTP diphosphatase activity; positive regulation of phosphatase activity; positive regulation of GTPase activity; liver regeneration; negative regulation of GTPase activity; negative regulation of nitric oxide biosynthetic process; negative regulation of RNA biosynthetic process; spermatogenesis; regulation of calcium-mediated signaling; negative regulation of epithelial cell proliferation; negative regulation of leucine-tRNA ligase activity; negative regulation of phosphoprotein phosphatase activity; liver development; negative regulation of cyclic-nucleotide phosphodiesterase activity; negative regulation of DNA catabolic process; negative regulation of DNA biosynthetic process; positive regulation of ATPase-coupled calcium transmembrane transporter activity; negative regulation of calcium-dependent ATPase activity; positive regulation of superoxide dismutase activity; L-ascorbic acid biosynthetic process
Sources:Amigo / QuickGO
Orthologs
Databases	NCBI: entry; OMA: entry
Species	Human	Mouse
Entrez	9104	19733
Ensembl	ENSG00000130988	ENSMUSG00000023070
UniProt	Q15493	Q64374
RefSeq (mRNA)	NM_001282848; NM_001282849; NM_004683; NM_152869	NM_009060
RefSeq (protein)	NP_001269777; NP_001269778; NP_004674; NP_690608	NP_033086
Location (UCSC)	Chr X: 47.08 – 47.09 Mb	Chr X: 20.42 – 20.43 Mb
PubMed search
- Wikidata
View/Edit Human	View/Edit Mouse

Regucalcin is a protein that in humans is encoded by the RGN gene

The protein encoded by this gene is a highly conserved, calcium-binding protein, that is preferentially expressed in the liver, kidney and other tissues. It may have an important role in calcium homeostasis. Studies in rats indicate that this protein may also play a role in aging, as it shows age-associated down-regulation. This gene is part of a gene cluster on chromosome Xp11.3-Xp11.23. Alternative splicing results in two transcript variants having different 5' UTRs, but encoding the same protein.

Regucalcin is a proposed name for a calcium-binding protein that was discovered in 1978 This protein is also known as Senescence Marker Protein-30 (SMP30). Regucalcin differs from calmodulin and other Ca^{2+}-related proteins as it does not contain an EF-hand motif of Ca^{2+}-binding domain. It may regulate the effect of Ca^{2+} on liver cell functions. From many investigations, regucalcin has been shown to play a multifunctional role in many cell types as a regulatory protein in the intracellular signaling system.

== Gene ==
Regucalcin and its gene (rgn) are identified in 16 species consisting of regucalcin family. Regucalcin is greatly expressed in the liver of rats, although the protein is found in small amounts in other tissues and cells. The rat regucalcin gene consists of seven exons and six introns, and several consensus regulatory elements exist upstream of the 5’-flanking region. The gene is localized on the proximal end of rat chromosome Xq11.1-12 and human Xp11.3-Xp11.23. AP-1, NFI-A1, RGPR-p117, and Wnt/β-catenin/TCF4 can bind to the promoter region of the rat regucalcin gene to mediate the Ca2+ and other signaling responses with various hormones and cytokines for transcriptional activation.

== Function ==
Regucalcin plays a pivotal role in the keep of intracellular Ca^{2+} homeostasis due to activating Ca^{2+} pump enzymes in the plasma membrane (basolateral membrane), microsomes (endoplasmic reticulum) and mitochondria of many cells. Regucalcin is localized in the cytoplasm, mitochondria, microsomes and nucleus. Regucalcin is translocated from cytoplasm to nucleus with hormone stimulation. Regucalcin has a suppressive effect on calcium signaling from the cytoplasm to the nucleus in the proliferative cells. Also, regucalcin has been demonstrated to transport into the nucleus of cells, and it can inhibit nuclear protein kinase, protein phosphatase, and deoxyribonucleic acid and ribonucleic acid synthesis. Regucalcin can control enhancement of cell proliferation due to hormonal stimulation. Moreover, regucalcin has been shown to have an inhibitory effect on aminoacyl t-RNA synthetase, a rate limiting enzyme at translational process of protein synthesis and an activatory effect on cystein protease and superoxide dismutase in liver and kidney cells.

Regucalcin is expressed in the neuron of brain tissues, and the decrease of brain regucalcin causes accumulation of calcium in the brain microsomes. Regucalcin has an inhibitory effect on protein kinase and protein phosphatase activity dependent on Ca signaling. Regucalcin has been shown to have an activatory effect on Ca pumping enzyme (Ca-ATPase) in heart sarcoplasmic reticulum. Regucalcin plays a role in the promotion of urinary calcium transport in the epithelial cells of kidney cortex. Overexpression of regucalcin suppresses cell death and apoptosis in the cloned rat hepatoma cells and normal rat kidney epithelial cells (NRK52E) induced by various signaling factors.

Thus, regucalcin plays a multifunctional role in the regulation of cell functions in liver, kidney cortex, heart and brain. Thus, regucalcin plays a pivotal role in keep of cell homeostasis and function. Regucalcin plays a pivotal role as a suppressor protein for cell signaling systems in many cell types.

== Pathophysiologic role ==
Overexpressing of regucalcin in rats (transgenic rats) has been shown to induce bone loss and hyperlipidemia with increasing age, indicating a pathophysiologic role. Regucalcin transgenic rat may be a useful tool as animal model in osteoporosis and hyperlipidemia. Also, regucalcin/SMP30-knockout mice are known to induce a suppression in ascorbic acid biosynthesis. The disorder of regucalcin expression has been proposed to be induced cancer, brain function, heart injury, kidney failure, osteoporosis, and hyperlipidemia. Regucalcin plays a novel role as a suppressor in carcinogenesis of human patients with various types of cancer including pancreatic cancer, breast cancer, hepatoma, and lung cancer. Of note, it has been conducted a systematic search to identify biomarker candidates for a frailty biomarker panel. Gene expression databases were to identify genes regulated in aging, longevity, and age-related diseases with a focus on secreted factors or molecules detectable in body fluids as potential frailty biomarkers. A total of 44 markers were evaluated in the seven categories listed above, and 19 were awarded a high priority score, 22 identified as medium priority and three were low priority. In each category high and medium priority markers were identified. Regucalcin (RGN) was proposed to be a core gene (protein) with high priority of frailty biomarkers in order to ascertain their diagnostic, prognostic and therapeutic potential. Notably, it has been shown that epigenetic modifications of survivin and regucalcin in non-small cell lung cancer tissues contribute to malignancy.
