= Kanematsu Masayoshi =

Japanese samurai

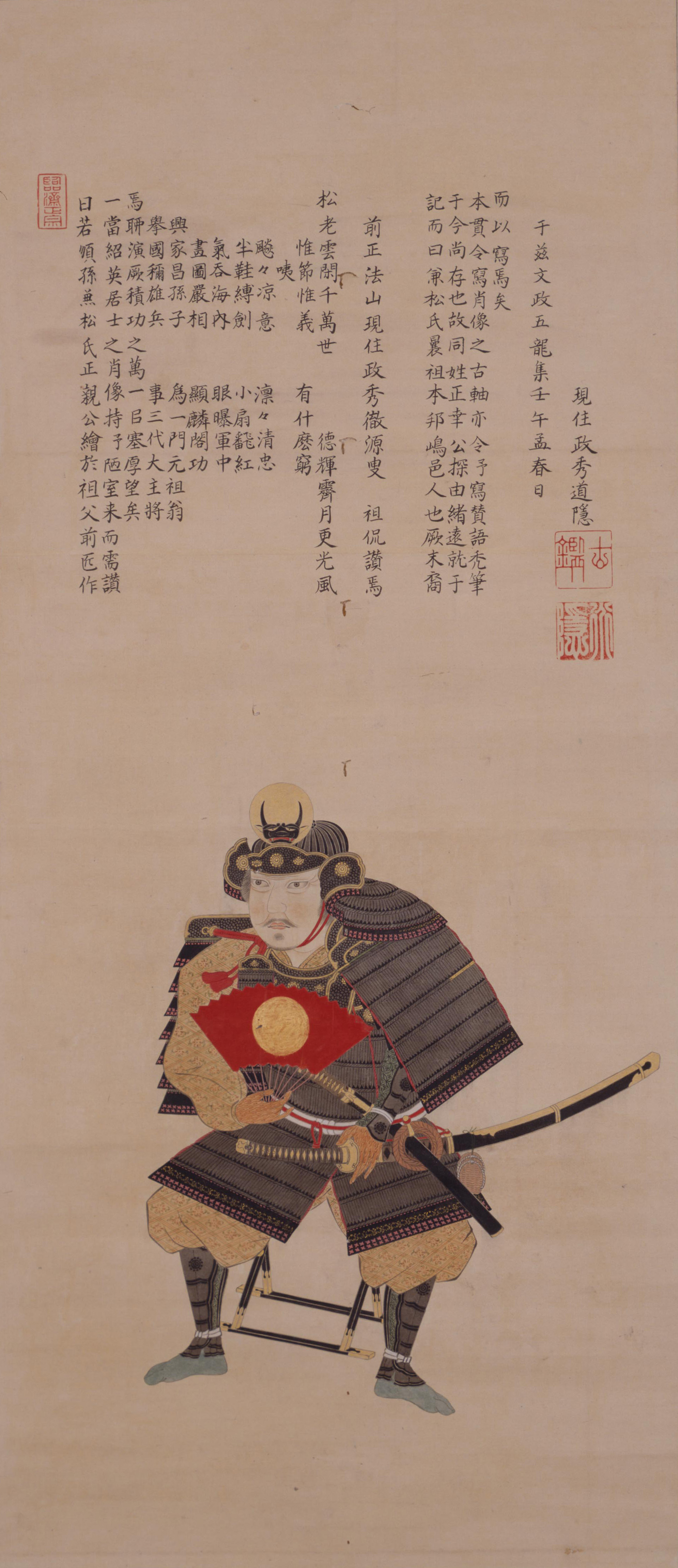

Kanematsu Masayoshi (兼松正吉, 1542–1616) was a Japanese samurai of the Azuchi-Momoyama period who served the Oda clan. Near the end of his life, Kanematsu Masayoshi became a retainer of the Tokugawa family of Owari.
