= Atlético Petróleos de Luanda in international football =

This article aims at providing details on the participation and performance of Atlético Petróleos de Luanda at the various competitions organized by the Confederation of African Football, namely the CAF Champions League, the CAF Confederation Cup and the former CAF Cup and CAF Winner's Cup as well as international tournaments and friendlies.

Petro de Luanda has a total 29 participations in CAF-sponsored competitions, including eight in the CAF Champions League, nine in the African Cup of Champions Clubs, seven in the CAF Confederation Cup, four in the CAF Cup Winners' Cup and one in the CAF Cup.

In 1997, the club reached the final of the CAF Cup, having finished as the runner-up. In 2001, they reached the semi-finals of the CAF Champions League. In 2004 and 2006, they reached the group stage of the CAF Confederation cup and in 2019–20, that of the Champions League.

Total participations (31)
Champions League: 10 (1998, 2001, 2002, 2004, 2007, 2009, 2010, 2019–20, 2020–21, 2021–22
African Cup of Champions Clubs: 10 (1983, 1985, 1987, 1988, 1989, 1990, 1991, 1994, 1995, 1996)
Confederation Cup: 9 (2004, 2006, 2008, 2010, 2013, 2014, 2015, 2018, 2018–19)
Cup Winners' Cup: 4 (1992, 1993, 1999, 2003)
CAF Cup: 1 (1997)
Results summary

Overall								Home						Away					
Pld	W	D	L	GF	GA	GD	Pts	W	D	L	GF	GA	GD	W	D	L	GF	GA	GD
132	58	33	41	203	150	+53	207	38	19	9	130	50	+80	20	14	32	73	100	−27

Last updated: 16 March 2018.

Stats
largest win – Petro (Angola) 9–2 (Equatorial Guinea) Mongomo (05 Apr 1998)
largest loss – Enugu Rangers (Nigeria) 4–0 (Angola) Petro (11 Sep 2004)

Goal scorers

As of 16 March 2018

- (18 goals) Flávio
- (11 goals) Mbiyavanga
- (10 goals) Manucho
- (9 goals) Avelino Lopes
- (8 goals) Amaral, Jesus, Paulito
- (7 goals) Job
- (6 goals) David, Mona
- (5 goals) Guedes, Joka
- (4 goals) Ladji Keita, Nelo Bumba, Paulo Silva, Tana, Zico
- (3 goals) Abel, Betinho, Jonas, Minhas, Ndunguidi, Santana, Tony, Zé Kalanga,
- (2 goals) Abdul, André, Antoninho, Chinho, Felito, Lufemba, Mabiná, Mabululu, Paulão, Santo António,
- (1 goal) Avex, Azulão, Balalau, Bavi, Bodunha, Cacharamba, Carlinhos, Carlos Pedro, Chara, Clarindo, Dico, Diney, Élio, Etah, Filhão, Gilberto, Gui, Haia, Kabongo, Kembua, Manguxi, Mateus, Mbunga, Nato Faial, Nejó, Rabolé, Rasgado, Riddy, Rosário, Saavedra, Sérgio, Yamba Asha

== 2021–22 Champions League ==
Sat, 18 Sep 2021 R1 2L	Petro Atlético (Angola)	0–0	(Cameroon) Fovu Baham	Luanda
16:00 WAT (UTC+1)		Report		Stadium: 11 de Novembro
Note: Mualucano / Eddie, Mindinho, Tó Carneiro, Quinito / Ito (substituted off) 45', Jaredi (substituted off) 90', Job (c) (substituted off) 45', Megue (substituted off) 59' / Azulão, Yano (substituted off) 90' — Soares (substituted on) 45', Maya (substituted off) 45', Dany (substituted on) 59', Gleison (substituted on) 90', Érico (substituted on) 90'

Sun, 12 Sep 2021 R1 1L	Fovu Baham (Cameroon)	2–2	(Angola) Petro Atlético	Yaoundé
15:30 WAT (UTC+1)	Nsangue 10'; Ikpeme 89'	Report	19' Azulão; 45' Jaredi	Stadium: Ahmadou Ahidjo; Referee: Yannick Kabanga; Ngila Guylain, Jean-Pierre Kabangu (DR Congo)
Note: Mualucano / Eddie, Mindinho, Pedro (substituted off) 72', Quinito / Ito, Jaredi (substituted off) 78', Maya (substituted off) 72', Megue / Azulão (c), Yano — Tó Carneiro (substituted on) 72', Dany (substituted on) 72', Sérgio (substituted on) 78'

== 2020–21 Champions League ==
Wed, 6 Jan 2021 R1 1L	Petro Atlético (Angola)	1–0	(Zambia) Nkana FC	Luanda
17:00 WAT (UTC+1)	Tony 76'			Stadium: 11 de Novembro; Referee: Eric Castane; Urbain Ndong, Felix Eyaga (Gabon)
Note: Dominique / Eddie, Matuwila, Musah, Pedro / Além, Joaquim Adão, Job (c), Picas (substituted off) 90+1' / Azulão (substituted off) 33', Yano (substituted off) 74' — Megue (substituted on) 33', Tony (substituted on) 74', Ito (substituted on) 90+1'

Wed, 23 Dec 2020 R1 1L	Nkana FC (Zambia)	1–1	(Angola) Petro Atlético	Kitwe
16:00 CAT (UTC+2)	Chisala 56'		88' Yano	Stadium: Nkana Stadium; Referee: Artur Alfinar, Venestâncio Cossa, Osvaldo Jesus (Mozambique)
Note: Dominique / Diógenes, Matuwila, Musah, Pedro / Além (substituted off) 62', Dany (substituted off) 70', Ito, Job (c) (substituted off) 63' / Azulão, Picas — Joaquim Adão (substituted on) 62', Tony (substituted on) 63', Yano (substituted on) 70'

Sat, 5 Dec 2020 PR 2L	Petro Atlético (Angola)	2–2	(Equatorial Guinea) Akonangui FC	Luanda
17:00 WAT (UTC+1)	Azulão 24'; Yano 87'	Report	51', 69' Lolín	Stadium: 11 de Novembro; Referee: Retselisitsoe Molisie, Lesupi Puputla, Mapoho Mapoho (Lesotho)
Note: Elber / Diógenes (substituted off) 45', Dos Santos (substituted off) 71', Musah, Pedro / Dany (substituted off) 64', Ito, Job (c), Mensah (substituted off) 56' / Azulão, Tony (substituted off) 57' — Eddie (substituted on) 45', Picas (substituted on) 56', Yano (substituted on) 57', Joaquim Adão (substituted on) 64', Megue (substituted on) 71'

Sat, 29 Nov 2020 PR 1L	Akonangui FC (Equatorial Guinea)	0–1	(Angola) Petro Atlético	Ebibeyin
15:30 WAT (UTC+1)		Report	36' Azulão	Stadium: Estadio de Ebibeyin; Referee: Fitial Kokolo, Beaudrel Roul, Sam Kenzet (Congo)
Note: Elber / Diógenes, Musah, Jó, Pedro (substituted off) 76' / Além, Dany, Job (c) (substituted off) 84', Picas / Azulão (substituted off) 84', Tony (substituted off) 72' — Yano (substituted on) 72', Tó Carneiro (substituted on) 76', Megue (substituted on) 84', Dos Santos (substituted on) 84'

== 2019–20 Champions League ==
Sat, 01 Feb 2020 GC R3 2L	USM Alger (Algeria)	2–2	(Angola) Petro Atlético	Bordj Bou Arréridj
14:00 CET (UTC+1)	Mahious 33'; Ardji 70'	Report	80' Picas; 81' Tony	Stadium: 20 Août; Referee: Sadok Selmi (Tunisia); Khalil Hasseni, Aymen Ismail
Note: Gerson / Diógenes, Musah, Tó Carneiro, Wilson / Além (substituted off) 75', Caranga (substituted off) 60', Herenilson, Job (c), Mensah (substituted off) 45' / Jacques — Picas (substituted on) 45', Tony (substituted on) 60', Manguxi (substituted on) 75'

Sat, 25 Jan 2020 GC R2 2L	Petro Atlético (Angola)	2–2	(South Africa) Mamelodi Sundowns	Luanda
14:00 WAT (UTC+1)	Job 40' (pen.); Jacques 70'	Report	22' (pen.) Sirino; 90' Madisha	Stadium: 11 de Novembro; Referee: Mahamadou Keita (Mali); Baba Yomboliba, Nouhou Bamba
Note: Gerson / Danilson, Diógenes, Tó Carneiro, Wilson / Além, Dany, Job (c), Mensah (substituted off) 62' / Jacques (substituted off) 87', Picas — Yano (substituted on) 62', Nari (substituted on) 87'

Sat, 11 Jan 2020 GC R1 2L	Petro Atlético (Angola)	2–2	(Morocco) Wydad Casablanca	Luanda
17:00 WAT (UTC+1)	Herenilson 20'; Dany 45'	Report	13' Kasengu; 53' Jabrane	Stadium: 11 de Novembro; Referee: Ibrahim Traoré (Côte d'Ivoire); Assts: Adou Ngoh, Ashumu Hermann
Note: Gerson / Danilson, Diógenes, Tó Carneiro, Wilson / Além (substituted off) 81', Dany, Herenilson, Job (c) (substituted off) 31', Mensah (substituted off) 67' / Tony — Picas (substituted on) 31', Dolly Menga (substituted on) 67', Yano (substituted on) 81'

Fri, 27 Dec 2019 GC R3 1L	Wydad Casablanca (Morocco)	4–1	(Angola) Petro Atlético	Casablanca
20:00 CET (UTC+1)	El Kaabi 28', 78', 90+2' (pen.); Wilson 83' (o.g.)	Report	67' Tony	Stadium: Mohammed V Referee: Janny Sikazwe (Zambia); Assts: Arsénio Marengula (Mozambique), Souru Phatšoane (Lesotho)
Note: Gerson / Danilson, Diógenes, Tó Carneiro, Wilson / Além, Dany (substituted off) 74', Job (c), Mensah (substituted off) 64', Nari (substituted off) 86' / Tony — Caranga (substituted on) 64', Megue (substituted on) 74', Yano (substituted on) 86'

Sat, 07 Dec 2019 GC R2 1L	Petro Atlético (Angola)	1–1	(Algeria) USM Alger	Luanda
14:00 WAT (UTC+1)	Tony 63'	Report	54' Benchaâ	Stadium: 11 de Novembro; Referee: Bamlak Weyesa (Ethiopia); Assts: Kindie Mussie, Temesgin Atango
Note: Elber / Diógenes, Musah, Tó Carneiro, Wilson / Além (substituted off) 67', Dany, Herenilson, Job (c), Mensah (substituted off) 84' / Tony (substituted off) 79' — Dolly Menga (substituted on) 67', Jacques (substituted on) 79', Yano (substituted on) 84'

Sat, 30 Nov 2019 GC R1 1L	Mamelodi Sundowns (South Africa)	3–0	(Angola) Petro Atlético	Pretoria
19:00 SAST (UTC+2)	Affonso 7'; Madisha 7'; Mkhulise 76'	Report		Stadium: Lucas Moripe; Referee: Gehad Grisha (Egypt); Assts: Tahssen Bedyer, Ahmed Taha
Note: Elber / Diógenes, Musah, Tó Carneiro, Wilson / Além, Dany, Job (c) (substituted off) 70', Mensah / Tony (substituted off) 81', Yano (substituted off) 71' — Caranga (substituted on) 70', Megue (substituted on) 71', Jacques (substituted on) 81'

Fri, 27 Sep 2019 FR 2L	Kampala City (Uganda)	1–1	(Angola) Petro Atlético	Kampala
16:00 EAT (UTC+3)	Kizza 56'		35' Job	Stadium: StarTimes; Referee: Ahmad Heeralall (Mauritius); Assts: Jean-Marc Pithia, Ram Babajee
Note: Elber / Diógenes, Musah, Tó Carneiro, Wilson / Além, Caranga, Dany (substituted off) , Job (c) (substituted off) / Mensah, Picas — Bugos (substituted on) 60', Megue (substituted on)

Sat, 14 Sep 2019 FR 1L	Petro Atlético (Angola)	0–0	(Uganda) Kampala City	Luanda
16:00 WAT (UTC+1)				Stadium: 11 de Novembro; Referee: Belay Tadesse (Ethiopia); Assts: Kindie Mussie, Tigle Belachew
Note: Elber / Eddie, Musah, Tó Carneiro, Wilson / Além, Caranga (substituted off) 72', Job (c), Manguxi (substituted off) 65' / Mensah (substituted off) 64', Picas — Gladilson (substituted on) 64', Dany (substituted on) 65', Diógenes (substituted on) 72'

Sun, 25 Aug 2019 PR 2L	Petro Atlético (Angola)	2–0	(Lesotho) Matlama FC	Luanda
16:00 WAT (UTC+1)	Mensah 37'; Benvindo 82'	Report		Stadium: 11 de Novembro; Referee: Tshepo Gobagoba (Botswana)
Note: Elber / Diógenes, Musah, Tó, Wilson / Caranga, Dany (substituted off) 71', Herenilson, Job (c), Megue (substituted off) 70' / Mensah (substituted off) 77' — Manguxi (substituted on) 70', Benvindo (substituted on) 71', Bugos (substituted on) 77'

Sun, 11 Aug 2019 PR 1L	Matlama FC (Lesotho)	0–2	(Angola) Petro Atlético	Maseru
15:00 SAST (UTC+2)	Tuyisenge 57' (pen.)	Report	7' Manguxi; 31' Mensah	Stadium: Setsoto Stadium; Referee: Norman Matemera (Zimbabwe)
Note: Elber / Eddie, Nari, Tó, Wilson (c) / Além, Caranga, Manguxi, Mensah / Megue, Picas — Diógenes (substituted on) , Herenilson (substituted on)

== 2018–19 Confederation Cup ==
Sun, 17 Mar 2019 GD R3 2L	Gor Mahia (Kenya)	1–0	(Angola) Petro Atlético	Nairobi
19:00 EAT (UTC+3)	Tuyisenge 57' (pen.)			Stadium: City Stadium; Referee: Rédouane Jiyed; Hicham Abbou, Yahya Nouali (Morocco)
Note: Elber / Danilson, Eddie, Tó (substituted off) 72', Wilson / Além, Herenilson, Job (c), Manguxi (substituted off) 60' / Azulão, Vá (substituted off) — Tony (substituted on) , Carlinhos (substituted on) 60', Mateus (substituted on) 72'

Sun, 10 Mar 2019 GD R2 2L	Petro Atlético (Angola)	2–0	(Algeria) Hussein Dey	Luanda
14:00 WAT (UTC+1)	Job 15'; Azulão 38' (pen.)	Report		Stadium: 11 de Novembro; Referee: Bernard Camille; Hensley Petrousse, James Emile (Seychelles)
Note: Elber / Danilson, Eddie, Tó, Wilson / Herenilson, Job (c), Manguxi (substituted off) 70', Tony (substituted off) 78' / Azulão, Vá (substituted off) 82' — Além (substituted on) 70', Mateus (substituted on) 78', Carlinhos (substituted on) 82'

Sun, 03 Mar 2019 GD R1 2L	Petro Atlético (Angola)	0–1	(Egypt) Zamalek	Luanda
17:00 WAT (UTC+1)		Report	26' Ahaddad	Stadium: 11 de Novembro; Referee: Pacifique Ndabihawenimana; Gustave Baguma, Willy Habimana (Burundi)
Note: Elber / Danilson, Diógenes, Eddie, Wilson / Além (substituted off) 46', Herenilson, Job (c) (substituted off) 85', Manguxi / Azulão, Tony — Mateus (substituted on) 46', Benvindo (substituted on) 85'

Sun, 24 Feb 2019 GD R3 1L	Zamalek (Egypt)	1–1	(Angola) Petro Atlético	Alexandria
21:00 EET (UTC+2)	Obama 90+3'	Report	58' Azulão	Stadium: Borg El Arab; Referee: Beida Dahane; Cheikh Pene, Ismaile Diallo (Mauritania)
Note: Elber / Danilson, Diógenes, Tó, Wilson / Eddie, Herenilson, Job (c) (substituted off) 56', Manguxi / Azulão (substituted off) 77', Vá (substituted off) 90' — Tony (substituted on) 56', Nari (substituted on) 77', Caranga (substituted on) 90'

Wed, 13 Feb 2019 GD R2 1L	Petro Atlético (Angola)	2–1	(Kenya) Gor Mahia	Luanda
17:00 WAT (UTC+1)	Manguxi 12'; Tony 37'	Report	90' Kipkirui	Stadium: 11 de Novembro; Referee: Tsegay Teklu; Berhe Tesfagiorghis, Suleiman Salih (Eritrea)
Note: Elber / Danilson, Diógenes, Nari (substituted off) 89', Wilson / Eddie, Job (c), Manguxi, Mateus (substituted off) 80' / Azulão, Tony (substituted off) 64' — Carlinhos (substituted on) 64', Caranga (substituted on) 80', Élio (substituted on) 89'

Sun, 03 Feb 2019 GD R1 1L	Hussein Dey (Algeria)	2–1	(Angola) Petro Atlético	Algiers
20:00 CET (UTC+1)	Tougai 18'; Alati 53'	Report	75' Vá	Stadium: 5 Juillet; Referee: Mohamed El Fadil; Mohammed Ibrahim, Omer Ahmed (Sudan)
Note: Gerson / Danilson, Diógenes, Eddie, Wilson / Caranga (substituted off) 59', Herenilson, Pedro (substituted off) 86', Tó (substituted off) 38' / Azulão, Vá — Tony (substituted on) 38', Mateus (substituted on) 59', Benvindo (substituted on) 86'

Sat, 19 Jan 2019 PO 2L	Petro Atlético (Angola)	2–1	(Mali) Stade Malien	Luanda
16:00 WAT (UTC+1)	Azulão 34'; Vá 80'	Report	90+3' Keita	Stadium: 11 de Novembro; Referee: Issa Sy; El Hadji Gueye, Amadou Ngom (Senegal)
Note: Gerson / Danilson, Diógenes, Eddie, Wilson / Além, Herenilson, Job (c) / Azulão (substituted off) 83', Tony (substituted off) 77', Vá — Carlinhos (substituted on) 77', Caranga (substituted on) 83'

Sat, 12 Jan 2019 PO 1L	Stade Malien (Mali)	1–1	(Angola) Petro Atlético	Bamako
16:00 UTC (UTC+0)	Sylla 23'	Report	32' Vá	Stadium: Modibo Kéïta; Referee: Ring Malong; George Olibo, Gasim Dehiya (South Sudan)
Note: Gerson / Danilson, Diógenes, Eddie, Wilson / Além, Herenilson, Job (c) (substituted off) 90', Mateus (substituted off) 77' / Tony (substituted off) 78', Vá — Caranga (substituted on) 77', Azulão (substituted on) 78', Carlinhos (substituted on) 90'

Fri, 21 Dec 2018 R1 2L	Petro Atlético (Angola)	1–0	(Democratic Republic of the Congo) AS Nyuki	Luanda
16:00 WAT (UTC+1)	Azulão 65'	Report		Stadium: 11 de Novembro; Referee: Celso Alvação; Arsénio Marengula, Olívio Saimone (Mozambique)
Note: Gerson / Danilson, Diógenes, Tó, Wilson / Além (substituted off) 90+3', Herenilson, Job (c), Tony (substituted off) 71' / Azulão, Vá (substituted off) 90+2' — Caranga (substituted on) 71', Nari (substituted on) 90+2', Élio (substituted on) 90+3'

Fri, 14 Dec 2018 R1 1L	AS Nyuki (Democratic Republic of the Congo)	0–1	(Angola) Petro Atlético	Kinshasa
15:30 WAT (UTC+1)		Report	28' Vá	Stadium: Stade des Martyrs; Referee: Belay Asserese; Temesgin Atango, Tigle Belachew (Ethiopia)
Note: Gerson / Danilson, Eddie, Tó, Wilson / Além, Herenilson, Job (c), Tony (substituted off) 66' / Azulão (substituted off) 86', Vá (substituted off) 61' — Caranga (substituted on) 61', Diógenes (substituted on) 66', Dennis (substituted on) 86'

Wed, 05 Dec 2018 PR 2L	Orapa United (Botswana)	0–2	(Angola) Petro Atlético	Orapa
19:00 WAT (UTC+1)		Report	50' Job; 53' Azulão	Stadium: Itekeng; Referee: Lebalang Mokete; Mapoho Mapoho, Moabi Makara (Lesotho)
Note: Gerson / Danilson (substituted off) 40', Eddie, Tó, Wilson / Além, Herenilson, Job (c), Mateus (substituted off) 71' / Azulão (substituted off) 65', Vá — Élio (substituted on) 40', Dennis (substituted on) 65', Tony (substituted on) 71'

Tue, 27 Nov 2018 PR 1L	Petro Atlético (Angola)	4–0	(Botswana) Orapa United	Luanda
16:00 WAT (UTC+1)	Job 32'; Vá 68'; Tony 85', 87'	Report		Stadium: 11 de Novembro; Referee: Ben Ibrahim; Basile Rambeloson, Pierre Andrivoavonjy (Madagascar)
Note: Gerson / Danilson, Eddie, Tó (substituted off) 90', Wilson / Além, Herenilson, Job (c) (substituted off) 90+2', Mateus (substituted off) 82' / Azulão, Vá — Tony (substituted on) 82', Ary (substituted on) 90', Tresor (substituted on) 90+2'

== 2018 Confederation Cup ==
Fri, 16 Mar 2018 FR 2L	SuperSport United (South Africa)	2–1	(Angola) Petro de Luanda	Pretoria
19:00 SAST (UTC+2)	Mnyamane 77', 82'	Report	49' Élio	Stadium: Lucas Moripe; Referee: Wisdom Chewe, Amos Chalwe, Oliver Mweene (Zambia)
Note: Gerson / Ary, Élio, Mira, Wilson / Carlinhos, Herenilson, Job (c) (substituted off) 61', Manguxi / Azulão (substituted off) 81', Diney (substituted off) 79' — Tresor (substituted on) 61', Tony (substituted on) 79', Dennis (substituted on) 81'

Tue, 06 Mar 2018 FR 1L	Petro de Luanda (Angola)	0–0	(South Africa) SuperSport United	Luanda
16:00 WAT (UTC+1)		Report		Stadium: 11 de Novembro; Referee: Simões Guambe, Arsénio Marengula, Zacarias Baloi (Mozambique)
Note: Gerson / Ary, Élio, Mira, Wilson / Carlinhos (substituted off) 61', Herenilson, Job (c), Tresor (substituted off) 86' / Azulão, Diney (substituted off) 72' — Tony (substituted on) 61', Manguxi (substituted on) 72', Francis (substituted on) 86'

Tue, 20 Feb 2018 PR 2L	Masters Security (Malawi)	0–0	(Angola) Petro de Luanda	Blantyre
14:30 CAT (UTC+2)		Report		Stadium: Kamuzu Stadium; Referee: Elly Sasii, Salim Mohamed, Ferdinand Chacha (Tanzania)
Note: Gerson / Ary, Gomito, Mira, Wilson / Diney (substituted off) 70', Francis (substituted off) 65', Herenilson, Tresor / Azulão (substituted off) 80', Tony — Bugos (substituted on) 65', Manguxi (substituted on) 70', Dennis (substituted on) 80'

Sat, 10 Feb 2018 PR 1L	Petro de Luanda (Angola)	5–0	(Malawi) Masters Security	Luanda
16:00 WAT (UTC+1)	Azulão 40'; Tony 74', 77', 84'; Diney 90+3'	Report		Stadium: 11 de Novembro; Referee: Jonas Shongedi, David Shaanika, Christof Vries (Namibia)
Note: Gerson / Diógenes, Élio, Mira, Wilson / Carlinhos (substituted off) 56', Herenilson, Job (c), Mateus (substituted off) 68' / Azulão (substituted off) 80', Diney — Manguxi (substituted on) 56', Tony (substituted on) 68', Dennis (substituted on) 80'

== 2015 Confederation Cup ==
Sun, 05 Apr 2015 R1 2L	Petro de Luanda (Angola)	0–1	(Eswatini) Royal Leopards	Luanda
15:00 WAT (UTC+1)		Report	54' Mkhontfo	Stadium: 11 de Novembro; Attendance: 3,000; Referee: Mohamed Benouza (Algeria)
Note: Lamá / Ary, Mabiná, Maludi, Vado / Diógenes, Chara, Manguxi (substituted off) 58', Mateus / Filhão (substituted off) 72', Job — Duarte (substituted on) 58', Balakai (substituted on) 72'

Sat, 14 Mar 2015 R1 1L	Royal Leopards (Eswatini)	2–2	(Angola) Petro de Luanda	Lobamba
14:30 SAST (UTC+2)	Nxumalo 35' (pen.); Gama 53'	Report	5' Mabululu; 75' Filhão	Stadium: Somhlolo Stadium; Referee: Osiase Koto, Souru Phatsoane, Lesupi Puputla (Lesotho)
Note: Lamá / Ary, Etah, Mabiná, Vado / Diógenes (substituted off) 74', Chara, Manguxi (substituted off) 85', Mateus (substituted off) 60' / Job, Mabululu — Filhão (substituted on) 60', Carlinhos (substituted on) 74', Wilson (substituted on) 85'

Sat, 28 Feb 2015 PR 2L	Petro de Luanda (Angola)	4–0	(Comoros) Volcan Club	Luanda
15:30 WAT (UTC+1)	Carlinhos 7'; Job 46' (pen.); Mateus 68'; Mabululu 71'	Report		Stadium: 11 de Novembro; Attendance: 2,000; Referee: Diosdado Nze, Ricardo Esono, José Andeme (Equatorial Guinea)
Note: Lamá / Abdul, Ary, Etah, Mabiná / Carlinhos (substituted off) 54', Chara (c) (substituted off) 70', Manguxi, Mateus / Job (substituted off) 53', Mabululu — Duarte (substituted on) 53', Balacai (substituted on) 54', Francis (substituted on) 70'

Sat, 14 Feb 2015 PR 1L	Volcan Club (Comoros)	0–1	(Angola) Petro de Luanda	Moroni
15:00 EAT (UTC+3)		Report	40' Manguxi	Stadium: Stade de Beaumer; Referee: Parmendra Nunkoo, Vinesh Swamber, Vivian Vally (Mauritius)
Note: Lamá / Ary, Mabiná, Maludi, Vado / Carlinhos, Chara, Manguxi (substituted off) 68', Mateus (substituted off) 81' / Job, Mabululu (substituted off) 74' — Mavambu (substituted on) 68', Filhão (substituted on) 74', Balakai (substituted on) 81'

== 2014 Confederation Cup ==
Sun, 27 Apr 2014 PO 2L	Petro de Luanda (Angola)	2–2	(Cameroon) Coton Sport	Luanda
16:00 WAT (UTC+1)	Abdul 10'; Keita 51'	Report	Daouda 15'; Djeugoué 86'	Stadium: 11 de Novembro; Referee: Bernard Camille (Seychelles)
Note: Lamá / Abdul, Borges, Diógenes, Isaac (substituted off) 76' / Chara (c), Gilberto, Manguxi (substituted off) 46', Nari / Flávio, Job – Ladji Keita (substituted on) 46', Osório (substituted on) 76'

Sun, 20 Apr 2014 PO 1L	Coton Sport (Cameroon)	2–1	(Angola) Petro de Luanda	Garoua
15:00 WAT (UTC+1)	Auzingoni 19' (pen.); Mbah 83'	Report	48' Job	Stadium: Stade Omnisport; Referee: Rédouane Jiyed (Morocco)
Note: Lamá / Abdul, Borges, Isaac, Osório / Chara (c), Francis, Gilberto, Manguxi (substituted off) 76' / Flávio (substituted off) 65', Job (substituted off) 85' – Ladji Keita (substituted on) 65', Mateus (substituted on) 76', Mabululu (substituted on) 85'

Sun, 30 Mar 2014 R2 2L	Petro de Luanda (Angola)	1–0	(Egypt) Ismaily	Luanda
16:00 WAT (UTC+1)	Abdul 54'	Report		Stadium: 11 de Novembro; Referee: Victor Gomes (South Africa)

Sun, 23 Mar 2014 R2 1L	Ismaily (Egypt)	0–0	(Angola) Petro de Luanda	Ismailia
15:00 EET (UTC+2)				Stadium: Ismailia Stadium; Referee: Ali Lemghaifry (Mauritius)

Sun, 09 Mar 2014 R1 2L	Petro de Luanda (Angola)	4–0	(Ghana) Ebusua Dwarfs	Luanda
16:00 WAT (UTC+1)	Flávio 33', 81'; Gilberto 73'; Keita 85'	Report		Stadium: 11 de Novembro; Referee: Joaquin Esono (Equatorial Guinea)

Sun, 02 Mar 2014 R1 1L	Ebusua Dwarfs (Ghana)	2–0	(Angola) Petro de Luanda	Cape Coast
15:00 SAST (UTC+2)	Ismael 85'; Adjei-Mensah 90+2'			Stadium: Cape Coast Sports; Referee: Emmanuel Neewon (Liberia)

Sun, 16 Feb 2014 PR 2L	Petro de Luanda (Angola)	3–0	(Namibia) African Stars	Luanda
15:30 WAT (UTC+1)	Toromba 2' (o.g.); Keita 43', 88'	Report		Stadium: 11 de Novembro; Referee: Wellington Kaoma (Zambia)

Fri, 07 Feb 2014 PR 1L	African Stars (Namibia)	2–0	(Angola) Petro de Luanda	Windhoek
19:00 WAST (UTC+2)	Seibeb 79', 85'			Stadium: Sam Nujoma; Referee: Lwandile Mfiki (South Africa)

== 2013 Confederation Cup ==
Sun, 07 Apr 2013 1R 2L	SuperSport United (South Africa)	2–0	(Angola) Petro de Luanda	Pretoria
18:00 SAST (UTC+2)	Zuma 30', 90' (pen.)			Stadium: Lucas Moripe; Referee: Emile Fred (Seychelles)

Sun, 17 Mar 2013 1R 1L	Petro de Luanda (Angola)	0–0	(South Africa) SuperSport United	Luanda
15:00 WAT (UTC+1)	Miguel (red card) 53'	Report		Stadium: Estádio 11 de Novembro; Referee: Ruzive Ruzive (Zimbabwe)

== 2010 Confederation Cup ==
Sun, 01 Aug 2010 PO 2L	CS Sfaxien (Tunisia)	3–1	(Angola) Petro de Luanda	Sfax
17:30 WAT (UTC+1)	Zaiem 28'; Younes 29'; Guemamdia 48'		85' Joka	Stadium: Taïeb Mhiri

Sat, 17 Jul 2010 PO 1L	Petro de Luanda (Angola)	0–0	(Tunisia) CS Sfaxien	Luanda
15:00 WAT (UTC+1)	Miguel (red card) 53'	Report		Stadium: Estádio da Cidadela

== 2010 Champions League ==
Sun, 09 May 2010 R2 2L	Petro de Luanda (Angola)	2–1	(Algeria) JS Kabylie	Luanda
16:00 WAT (UTC+1)	David 5'; Job 13'	Report	54' Aoudia	Stadium: 11 de Novembro; Referee: Daniel Bennett (South Africa)
Note: Lamá / Cassoma, Etah, Renato (substituted off) 74', Yamba Asha / Avex (substituted off) 79', Chara, Job, Mabiná / David, Joka (substituted off) 64' – Day Day (substituted on) 64', Riddy (substituted on) 74' Malamba (substituted on) 79'

Sun, 25 Apr 2010 R2 1L	JS Kabylie (Algeria)	2–0	(Angola) Petro de Luanda	Tizi Ouzou
16:00 CET (UTC+1)	Hamiti 51'; Aoudia 90'	Report		Stadium: 1er Novembre; Referee: Eddy Maillet (Seychelles)
Note: Lamá / Cassoma (substituted off) 65', Etah, Locó, Jamuana / Avex (substituted off) 74', Chara, Mabiná, Nuno Neto / Job (substituted off) 59', Santana – Joka (substituted on) 59', Nelo II (substituted on) 65' Malamba (substituted on) 74'

Sun, 04 Apr 2010 R1 2L	Petro de Luanda (Angola)	1–0	(Morocco) Raja Casablanca	Luanda
16:00 WAT (UTC+1)	Riddy 64'	Report		Stadium: 11 de Novembro; Referee: Kalyoto Ngosi (Malawi)
Note: Lamá / Cassoma, Locó, Renato, Yamba Asha / Avex Malamba (substituted on) , Carlão, Job, Mabiná (substituted off) Joka (substituted on) / David, Riddy (substituted off) Santana (substituted on)

Sun, 21 Mar 2010 R1 1L	Raja Casablanca (Morocco)	1–1	(Angola) Petro de Luanda	Casablanca
17:00 WET (UTC+0)	Moutouali 48' (pen.)	Report	43' Avex	Stadium: Mohamed V Referee: Mohamed Benouza (Algeria)

Sun, 28 Feb 2010 PR 2L	Petro de Luanda (Angola)	6–1	(Equatorial Guinea) Elá Nguema	Luanda
16:00 WAT (UTC+1)	Etah 33'; Asha 51'; Joka 57', 64', 80'; Job 86'	Report	Eyama 86'	Stadium: 11 de Novembro; Referee: Joshua Bondo, Meshack Medupi, Jackson Simon (Botswana)
Note: Lamá / Cassoma, Etah, Jamuana, Yamba Asha / Chara (c) (substituted off) 67', Mabiná, Malamba (substituted off) 63', Nelo / Job, Santana (substituted off) 46' – Joka (substituted on) 46', Dany (substituted on) 63', Nuno (substituted on) 67'

Sun, 14 Feb 2010 PR 1L	Elá Nguema (Equatorial Guinea)	2–3	(Angola) Petro de Luanda	Malabo
15:30 WAT (UTC+1)	Cassoma 68' (o.g.); Touré 73' (pen.)		15', 90' Santana; 18' Mabiná	Stadium: Estadio Internacional; Referee: Kalla Mouandjo (Cameroon)

== 2009 Champions League ==
Sat, 04 Apr 2009 R1 2L	Petro de Luanda (Angola)	1–2	(Democratic Republic of the Congo) TP Mazembe	Luanda
15:00 WAT (UTC+1)	David 90+2'	Report	16' Trésor; 27' Kaluyituka	Stadium: Cidadela; Referee: Thapelo Disang (Botswana)
Note: Papy / Etah, Jamuana, Sérgio, Yamba Asha / Chara, Job, Mabiná (substituted off) 46', Malamba (substituted off) 74' / David, Moussa – Wanga (substituted on) 46', Day Day (substituted on) 74'

Sun, 15 Mar 2009 R1 1L	TP Mazembe (Democratic Republic of the Congo)	3–0	(Angola) Petro de Luanda	Lubumbashi
15:00 CAT (UTC+2)	Kabangu 17'; Trésor 43', 75'			Stadium: Municipal de Lubumbashi; Referee: Jerome Damon; Enock Molefe, Toko Malebo (South Africa)
Note: Lamá / Etah, Jamuana, Sérgio, Yamba Asha / Chara, David, Job, Malamba / Mabiná, Moussa (substituted off) –

Sun, 15 Feb 2009 PR 2L	Royal Leopards (Eswatini)	0–3	(Angola) Petro de Luanda	Simunye
15:00 SAST (UTC+2)			9' Sérgio; 11', 40' Job	Stadium: Simunye Park; Referee: Jonas Nhlapo (South Africa)

Sun, 01 Feb 2009 PR 1L	Petro de Luanda (Angola)	3–0	(Eswatini) Royal Leopards	Luanda
15:00 WAT (UTC+1)	David 16', 47'; Job 27'	Report		Stadium: Estádio da Cidadela; Referee: Kenias Marange; Cosmas Chafa, Ngoni Boyd (Zimbabwe)
Note: Lamá / Etah, Jamuana, Locó, Yamba Asha / Chara, Job (substituted off) , Mabiná, Malamba (substituted off) / David, Moussa (substituted off) – Stanick (substituted on) , Wanga (substituted on) , Tunga (substituted on)

== 2008 Confederation Cup ==
Sun, 06 Apr 2008 R1 2L	Mangasport (Gabon)	1–0	(Angola) Petro de Luanda	Sfax
15:00 WAT (UTC+1)

Sun, 23 Mar 2008 R1 1L	Petro de Luanda (Angola)	1–2	(Gabon) Mangasport	Luanda
15:00 WAT (UTC+1)	David 13'	Report	13', 61' Bembangoque	Stadium: Estádio da Cidadela; Referee: Jonas Nhlapo, Toko Malebo
Note: Lamá / Etah, Jamuana, Mabiná (substituted off) 56', Sérgio / Chara, David (substituted off) 38', Malamba, Nelo / Bennet (substituted off) 77', Job — Santana (substituted on) 38', Wanga (substituted on) 56', Renato (substituted on) 77'

== 2007 Champions League ==
Sun, 18 Mar 2007 R1 1L	Petro de Luanda (Angola)	2–0	(Tanzania) Young Africans	Luanda
15:30 WAT (UTC+1)	Manucho 83'; Kembua 90+1'			Stadium: Estádio da Cidadela
Note: J.Ricardo / Carlão, Cassoma, Etah (substituted off) **', Renato / Buá (substituted off) ***', David (substituted off) *', Humberto, Malamba / Chinho, Manucho – Kembua (substituted on) *', Santana (substituted on) **', V.Pereira (substituted on) ***'

Sun, 04 Mar 2007 R1 2L	Young Africans (Tanzania)	3–0	(Angola) Petro de Luanda	Dar es Salaam
15:00 EAT (UTC+3)	Renato 77' (o.g.); Kassim 83'; Ngassa 88'			Stadium: National Stadium
Note: J.Ricardo / Etah, H.Vicente, Lebo Lebo, Renato / Chara (substituted off) *', David (substituted off) ***', Humberto (substituted off) **', Malamba / Manucho, Santana – Buá (substituted on) *', Chinho (substituted on) **', V.Pereira (substituted on) ***'

Sat, 10 Feb 2007 PR 2L	F.C. Civics (Namibia)	1–1	(Angola) Petro de Luanda	Windhoek
15:00 WAST (UTC+2)	Brendell 86'		11' Manucho	Stadium: Independence
Note: Lamá / Etah, H.Vicente, Lebo Lebo, Renato / Chara, Chinho, David, Malamba / Manucho, Santana

Sat, 27 Jan 2007 PR 1L	Petro de Luanda (Angola)	1–0	(Namibia) F.C. Civics	Luanda
15:00 WAT (UTC+1)	Santana 49'	Report		Stadium: Coqueiros; Referee: Alain Poungui (Congo)
Note: Lamá / Cassoma (substituted off) **', H.Vicente (c), Lebo Lebo, Renato / Chara, Chinho, Humberto, V.Pereira / Manucho, Santana (substituted off) *' – Lunguinha (substituted on) *', Malamba (substituted on) **'

== 2006 Confederation Cup ==
Sat, 28 Oct 2006 GA R2 1L	FAR Rabat (Morocco)	2–1	(Angola) Petro de Luanda	Rabat
15:00 WAT (UTC+1)	Ouaddouch 28'; Benkassou 66'		79' Chinho	Stadium: Prince Moulay Abdellah

Sun, 15 Oct 2006 GA R1 1L	Petro de Luanda (Angola)	4–1	(Angola) Interclube	Luanda
15:00 WAT (UTC+1)	Manucho 5', 36', 76'; Mabiná 38'	Report	74' (pen.) P.Henriques	Stadium: Estádio da Cidadela

Sat, 23 Sep 2006 GA R1 1L	Petro de Luanda (Angola)	1–1	(Morocco) Olympique Khouribga	Luanda
15:00 WAT (UTC+1)	David 64'	Report	69' Amzil	Stadium: Estádio da Cidadela; Referee: Verson Lwanja (Malawi)

Sun, 10 Sep 2006 GA R2 1L	Olympique Khouribga (Morocco)	1–0	(Angola) Petro de Luanda	Khouribga
15:00 WAT (UTC+1)	Fellah 18'			Stadium: Stade du Phosphate

Sat, 26 Aug 2006 GA R1 1L	Petro de Luanda (Angola)	1–1	(Morocco) FAR Rabat	Luanda
15:00 WAT (UTC+1)	Tana 22'		65' Lotfi	Stadium: Estádio da Cidadela

Sat, 12 Aug 2006 GA R2 1L	Interclube (Angola)	1–3	(Angola) Petro de Luanda	Luanda
15:00 WAT (UTC+1)	Nzinga 73'	Report	30' Mbiyavanga; 53' Manucho; 60' Chara	Stadium: 22 de Junho; Referee: Daniel Bennett, Lazarus Matela, Yugesi Anjith (South Africa)

Sun, 30 Jul 2006 IR 1L	Petro de Luanda (Angola)	Walkover	(Senegal) Port Autonome	Luanda
15:00 WAT (UTC+1)				Stadium: Estádio da Cidadela

Sun, 16 Jul 2006 IR 2L	Port Autonome (Senegal)	0–1	(Angola) Petro de Luanda	Dakar
15:00 WAT (UTC+1)			48' Manucho	Stadium: Demba Diop

Sat, 06 May 2006 R16 1L	Petro de Luanda (Angola)	2–0	(Ghana) Berekum Arsenal	Luanda
15:00 WAT (UTC+1)	Mbiyavanga 61'; Zé Kalanga 73'	Report		Stadium: Estádio da Cidadela; Referee: Osareniye Aigbe, Ero Olatunde, Robert Aundugh (Nigeria)

Sun, 23 Apr 2006 R16 2L	Berekum Arsenal (Ghana)	0–0	(Angola) Petro de Luanda	Berekum
15:00 WAT (UTC+1)				Stadium: Berekum Stadium

Sun, 02 Apr 2006 R32 1L	Petro de Luanda (Angola)	2–2	(Cameroon) Astres Douala	Luanda
15:00 WAT (UTC+1)	Manucho 2'; Zé Kalanga 70'	Report	21' Ekanga; 66' Mog	Stadium: Estádio da Cidadela; Referee: Frank Mlangeni (Swaziland)
Note: Lamá / Delgado (substituted off) 45', H.Vicente, Nsuka, Tana (c) / Chara, Joni, Bondoso (substituted off) 46', Zé Kalanga / E.Cata (substituted off) , Manucho — Miro (substituted on) 45', David (substituted on) 46', M.Lopes (substituted on)

Sun, 19 Mar 2006 R32 2L	Astres Douala (Cameroon)	1–2	(Angola) Petro de Luanda	Douala
15:00 WAT (UTC+1)	Ncha Ncha 20'	Report	13', 37' Manucho; (red card) 77' Renato	Stadium: Stade de la Réunification; Referee: Acacio Mibuy, Antonio Makina, Martin Nchama (Equatorial Guinea)
Note: Lamá / Delgado (substituted off) 33', H.Vicente, Renato, Tana (c) / Chara, Joni, Miro (substituted off) 35', Zé Kalanga (substituted off) 72' / E.Cata, Manucho — Lebo Lebo (substituted on) 33', Nsuka (substituted on) 35', M.Lopes (substituted on) 72'

== 2004 Confederation Cup ==
Fri, 12 Nov 2004 GA 2L R3	Petro de Luanda (Angola)	0–0	(Nigeria) Enugu Rangers	Luanda
15:30 WAT (UTC+1)		Report		Stadium: Estádio da Cidadela

Sun, 31 Oct 2004 GA 2L R2	Al-Hilal (Sudan)	1–0	(Angola) Petro de Luanda	Khartoum
15:00 WAT (UTC+1)	Tambal			Stadium: Khartoum Stadium

Sun, 17 Oct 2004 GA 2L R1	Petro de Luanda (Angola)	1–1	(Ghana) Asante Kotoko	Luanda
15:00 WAT (UTC+1)	Flávio 87'		33' Chibsah	Stadium: Estádio da Cidadela

Sat, 25 Sep 2004 GA 1L R3	Asante Kotoko (Ghana)	2–1	(Angola) Petro de Luanda	Kumasi
15:00 WAT (UTC+1)	Oduro 57'; Shilla 63'		48' Flávio	Stadium: Kumasi Sports

Sat, 11 Sep 2004 GA 1L R2	Enugu Rangers (Nigeria)	4–0	(Angola) Petro de Luanda	Ibadan
15:00 WAT (UTC+1)	Osagie 17', 32'; Ojo 26'; Odita 82'	Report		Stadium: Lekan Salami

Sun, 08 Aug 2004 GA 1L R1	Petro de Luanda (Angola)	3–1	(Sudan) Al-Hilal	Luanda
15:30 WAT (UTC+1)	Mbunga 21'; Flávio 55'; Zé Kalanga 80'	Report	3' (o.g.) D.Caires	Stadium: Estádio da Cidadela; Referee: Daniel Bennett (South Africa)

Sat, 24 Jul 2004 IR 2L	FAR Rabat (Morocco)	0–1	(Angola) Petro de Luanda	Rabat
17:30 WAT (UTC+1)			44' Flávio	Stadium: Prince Moulay Abdellah

Sun, 11 Jul 2004 IR 1L	Petro de Luanda (Angola)	0–0	(Morocco) FAR Rabat	Luanda
15:30 WAT (UTC+1)		Report		Stadium: Estádio da Cidadela; Referee: Emanuel Imiere (Nigeria)

== 2004 Champions League ==
Sat, 29 May 2004 R2 2L	Petro de Luanda (Angola)	1–2	(Nigeria) Enyimba	Luanda
15:30 WAT (UTC+1)	Av.Lopes 62'		10' Yusuf; 85' David	Stadium: Cidadela
Note: Lamá / D.Caires, Milocas, Tana, Miro / Abó, Taty (substituted off) *', T.Osódio, Zé Kalanga / Av.Lopes, Mbunga – Gazeta (substituted on) *'

Sun, 16 May 2004 R2 1L	Enyimba (Nigeria)	1–1	(Angola) Petro de Luanda	Aba
15:00 WAT (UTC+1)	Emeka 78'	Report	35' Flávio	Stadium: Enyimba
Note: Lamá / D.Caires, Michel, Stiller, Tana / Elson (substituted off) *', Miro (substituted off) **', Taty, T.Osódio (substituted off) ***' / Abó, Flávio – Zé Kalanga (substituted on) *', Av.Lopes (substituted on) **', Milocas (substituted on) ***'

Tue, 27 Apr 2004 R1 2L	Petro de Luanda (Angola)	2–1	(Zimbabwe) Amazulu	Luanda
15:30 WAT (UTC+1)	Tana 68', 83'		61' Nyoni	Stadium: Cidadela
Note: Lamá / D.Caires, Manuel, Miro, Tana / Chanda, Chara, Elson, T.Osódio / Flávio, N.Faial

Sun, 11 Apr 2004 R1 1L	Amazulu (Zimbabwe)	0–0	(Angola) Petro de Luanda	Bulawayo
15:00 WAT (UTC+1)				Stadium: Amazulu
Note: Lamá / D.Caires, Manuel, Miro, Tana / Chanda, Chara, Elson, T.Osódio / Flávio, N.Faial

Sun, 21 Mar 2004 PR 2L	Atlético de Malabo (Equatorial Guinea)	1–3	(Angola) Petro de Luanda	Bata
15:00 WAT (UTC+1)	Ndongui 9'		25' Tana; 58' Flávio; Av.Lopes	Stadium: La Paz

Sat, 06 Mar 2004 PR 1L	Petro de Luanda (Angola)	3–1	(Equatorial Guinea) Atlético de Malabo	Luanda
16:00 WAT (UTC+1)	Flávio 43'; Av.Lopes 70'; N.Faial 90+3'	Report	14' Edouthá	Stadium: Cidadela; Referee: Christopher Manuel, Gladmore Muzambi, Cosmas Nyoni (Zimbabwe)
Note: Lamá / D.Caires, Miro, Stiller, Tana / Chara, Elson (substituted off) **', Gazeta (substituted off) *', T.Osódio / Flávio, Av.Lopes – Manucho (substituted on) *', N.Faial (substituted on) **'

== 2003 Cup Winners' Cup ==
Sun, 27 Apr 2003 R1 2L	Petro de Luanda (Angola)	1–1	(Republic of the Congo) Étoile du Congo	Luanda
15:00 WAT (UTC+1)	Flávio 8' (pen.)	Report	48' Ockoly	Stadium: Estádio da Cidadela

Sun, 13 Apr 2003 R1 1L	Étoile du Congo (Republic of the Congo)	1–0	(Angola) Petro de Luanda	Brazzaville
15:00 WAT (UTC+1)	Patrick Lolo 46'			Stadium: Stade de la Revolution

== 2002 Champions League ==
Sun, 10 Mar 2002 R1	Petro de Luanda (Angola)	1–1 (a.e.t.) (2–4 p)	(Madagascar) Emyrne	Luanda
17:00 WAT (UTC+1)	Flávio		31' Muia	Stadium: Estádio da Cidadela; Referee: ()
	Penalties
	Flávio (penalty missed); Chinho (penalty missed); D.Caires (penalty missed)		(penalty missed) Henry; (penalty missed) Oliver

== 2001 Champions League ==
Sun, 18 Nov 2001 SF 2L	Petro de Luanda (Angola)	2–0 (3–5 p)	(South Africa) Mamelodi Sundowns	Luanda
15:00 WAT (UTC+1)	Mbiyavanga 24', 47'	Report		Stadium: Estádio da Cidadela; Referee: Alex Quartey (Ghana)
	Penalties
	Zico (penalty missed); Jonas (penalty missed)
Note: Lamá / Delgado, D.Caires, Maninho, Renato / Gilberto, Gui (substituted off) 80', Jonas, Mbiyavanga (substituted off) 74' / Av.Lopes, Flávio — Zico (substituted on) 74', Betinho (substituted on) 80'

Sat, 03 Nov 2001 SF 1L	Mamelodi Sundowns (South Africa)	2–0	(Angola) Petro de Luanda	Pretoria
15:00 SAST (UTC+2)	Scott 36'; Mudau 90'			Stadium: Caledonian Stadium; Referee: Eddy Mailett, Spiro Waller, Simon George (Seychelles)
Note: Lamá / Delgado, Didi, D.Caires, Jonas (substituted off) 80' / Gilberto, Gui, Mbiyavanga (substituted on) 71', Zico (substituted off) 46' / Av.Lopes, Flávio — Caricoco (substituted on) 46', Betinho (substituted on) 71', Riquinho (substituted on) 80'

Sun, 21 Oct 2001 GB 2L R3	Petro de Luanda (Angola)	0–1	(Ivory Coast) ASEC Mimosas	Luanda
15:00 WAT (UTC+1)		Report	90' (pen.) Kanté	Stadium: Estádio da Cidadela; Referee: Felix Tangawarima (Zimbabwe)
Note: Lamá / Delgado, Didí, Dias Caires, Renato / Gilberto, Gui, Jonas (substituted off) 74', Mbiyavanga (substituted off) 73' / Av.Lopes (substituted off) 85', Flávio — Zico (substituted on) 73', Mbunga (substituted on) 74', Caricoco (substituted on) 85'

Fri, 05 Oct 2001 GB 2L R2	Al Ahly (Egypt)	2–4	(Angola) Petro de Luanda	Cairo
15:00 EET (UTC+2)	Ibrahim 60'; Mansaray 70'		9' Mbiyavanga; 18', 55' Flávio; 49' Av.Lopes	Stadium: Military Academy

Sun, 23 Sep 2001 GB 2L R1	Petro de Luanda (Angola)	2–1	(Algeria) Belouizdad	Luanda
15:00 WAT (UTC+1)	Av.Lopes 2'; Flávio 20'	Report	86' Boukessassa	Stadium: Estádio da Cidadela; Referee: Lim Kee Chong (Mauritius)
Note: Lamá / Deodato, Dias Caires, Maninho, Renato / Gilberto, Gui, Jonas, Mbiyavanga (substituted off) 81' / Av.Lopes, Flávio — Zico (substituted on) 81'

Fri, 07 Sep 2001 GB 1L R3	Belouizdad (Algeria)	0–1	(Angola) Petro de Luanda	Algiers
15:00 CET (UTC+1)			88' Chinho	Stadium: Stade du 5 Juillet

Sun, 26 Aug 2001 GB 1L R2	ASEC Mimosas (Ivory Coast)	1–2	(Angola) Petro de Luanda	Abidjan
16:00 GMT (UTC+0)	Koutouan 72'		41', 82' Mbiyavanga	Stadium: F. Houphouët-Boigny

Sun, 12 Aug 2001 GB 1L R1	Petro de Luanda (Angola)	1–3	(Egypt) Al Ahly	Luanda
15:00 WAT (UTC+1)	Flávio 70' (pen.)	Report	5' Ibrahim; 34' Sunday; 82' Moslem	Stadium: Estádio da Cidadela; Referee: Petros Mathabela (South Africa)
Note: Nando / Delgado, Deodato, Dias Caires, Renato / Gui, Jonas (substituted off) 81', Mbiyavanga, Zico (substituted off) 76' / Av.Lopes, Flávio — Gilberto (substituted on) 76', Mbunga (substituted on) 81'

Sun, 27 May 2001 R2 2L	Étoile du Congo (Republic of the Congo)	2–2	(Angola) Petro de Luanda	Brazzaville
15:00 WAT (UTC+1)			Mbiyavanga	Stadium: Stade de la Revolution

Sun, 13 May 2001 R2 1L	Petro de Luanda (Angola)	4–1	(Republic of the Congo) Étoile du Congo	Luanda
15:00 WAT (UTC+1)	Av.Lopes 40', 47', 61' (pen.); Flávio 79'		34' Moandzu	Stadium: Estádio da Cidadela

Sun, 15 Apr 2001 R1 2L	Petro de Luanda (Angola)	3–2	(Cameroon) Fovu Baham	Cabinda
15:00 WAT (UTC+1)	Flávio 20', 81'; Mbiyavanga 64'		38' Moukane; 43' Elame	Stadium: Estádio do Tafe

Sat, 31 Mar 2001 R1 1L	Fovu Baham (Cameroon)	2–2	(Angola) Petro de Luanda	Yaoundé
15:00 WAT (UTC+1)	Zock 10'; Moukane 42'		14' Betinho; 14' Mbiyavanga	Stadium: Ahmadou Ahidjo

== 1999 Cup Winners' Cup ==
Tue, 30 Mar 1999 R1 2L	AS Dragons (Democratic Republic of the Congo)	4–1	(Angola) Petro de Luanda	Kinshasa
15:00 WAT (UTC+1)			Guedes	Stadium: Stade du 20 Mai

Sun, 14 Mar 1999 R1 1L	Petro de Luanda (Angola)	2–0	(Democratic Republic of the Congo) AS Dragons	Luanda
15:00 WAT (UTC+1)	Jonas 2'; César Caná 21'			Stadium: Estádio da Cidadela

== 1998 Champions League ==
Sun, 10 May 1998 R1 2L	Eagle Cement (Nigeria)	2–0	(Angola) Petro de Luanda	Port Harcourt
15:00 WAT (UTC+1)	Abubakar 64', 69'			Stadium: Sharks Stadium

Sun, 26 Apr 1998 R1 1L	Petro de Luanda (Angola)	0–1	(Nigeria) Eagle Cement	Luanda
15:00 WAT (UTC+1)			35' Abubakar	Stadium: Estádio da Cidadela

Sun, 5 Apr 1998 R1 2L	Petro de Luanda (Angola)	9–2	(Equatorial Guinea) Deportivo Mongomo	Luanda
15:00 WAT (UTC+1)	Gui 16'; Jonas 16'; Guedes 28'; Zico 44', 45+1'; Minhas 55'; Bodunha; Betinho 70'; Paulito 85'		12' Efiong	Stadium: Estádio da Cidadela; Referee: Mateus Infante, Ibrahim Fontes, Fernando Massavanhane (Mozambique)

Mon, 23 Mar 1998 R1 1L	Deportivo Mongomo (Equatorial Guinea)	1–4	(Angola) Petro de Luanda	Bata
15:00 WAT (UTC+1)	Yebu 3'		22' Betinho; 32' Minhas; 60' Paulito; 75' Zico	Stadium: Estadio de Bata

== 1997 CAF Cup ==
=== Final ===
==== Second leg ====
Sun, 16 November 1997
15:00

Petro de Luanda (Angola)	1–0	(Tunisia) Espérance de Tunis
Paulo Silva 80'	Report

Estádio da Cidadela, Luanda
Referee: Yigzaw Bezuayehu (Ethiopia)

Petro	Espérance

GK	(Angola) Marito
RB	(Angola) Bodunha
CB	(Angola) Chico Dinis
CB	(Angola) Maninho
LB	(Angola) Delgado	Substituted off
RM	(Angola) Gui
DM	(Angola) Jonas
CM	(Angola) Minhas	Substituted off
LM	(Angola) Cacharamba
FW	(Angola) Guedes
FW	(Angola) Zico
Substitutions:
FW	(Angola) Amaral	Substituted on
DF	(Angola) Paulo Silva	Substituted on
–
Manager:
(Brazil) Jorge Ferreira

GK	(Tunisia) El Ouaer
RB	6	(Tunisia) Sahbani
CB
CB
LB	(Tunisia) Thabet
RM
DM	(Tunisia) Chihi
CM
LM
FW
FW
Substitutions:
MF
DF
–
Manager:
(Tunisia) Youssef Zouaoui

Assistant referees:

Fourth official:

Commissioner:

==== Second leg ====
Sat, 29 November 1997
15:00

Espérance de Tunis (Tunisia)	2–0	(Angola) Petro de Luanda
Tlemçani 10'; Badra 46'	Report

El Menzah, Tunis
Referee: Gamal Al-Ghandour (Egypt)

Espérance	Petro

GK	(Tunisia) El Ouaer	(yellow card) 87'
RB	6	(Tunisia) Sahbani
CB	(Tunisia) Hichri
CB	26	(Tunisia) Badra
LB	(Tunisia) Thabet
RM	(Tunisia) Gabsi
DM	(Tunisia) Chihi
CM	(Tunisia) Kanzari	(substituted off) 80'
LM	(Tunisia) Hamrouni	(substituted off) 68'
FW	(Tunisia) Tlemçani
FW	(Tunisia) El Badraoui
Substitutions:
MF	(Tunisia) Chebbi	(yellow card) 74'	(substituted on) 68'
DF
DF
–
Manager:
(Tunisia) Youssef Zouaoui

GK	(Angola) Marito
RB	(Angola) Bodunha
CB	(Angola) Chico Dinis	(yellow card) 81'
CB	(Angola) Maninho	(yellow card) 29'
LB	(Angola) Delgado		(substituted off) 52'
RM	(Angola) Gui
DM	(Angola) Jonas
CM	(Angola) Zico
LM	(Angola) Cacharamba	(yellow card) 2'	(substituted off) 82'
FW	(Angola) Guedes		(substituted off) 78'
FW	(Angola) Paulo Silva		(substituted off) 78'
Substitutions:
MF	(Angola) Minhas		(substituted on) 52'
FW	(Angola) Betinho		(substituted on) 78'
FW	(Angola) Langa		(substituted on) 82'
–
Manager:
(Brazil) Jorge Ferreira

Assistant referees:

Fourth official:

Commissioner:

Sat, 29 Nov 1997 F 2L	Espérance Tunis (Tunisia)	2–0	(Angola) Petro de Luanda	Tunis
15:00 WAT (UTC+1)	Tlemçani 10'; Badra 46'		(red card) 69' Nelo	Stadium: El Menzah; Referee: Gamal Al-Ghandour (Egypt)
Note: Marito / Bodunha, C.Dinis, Delgado (substituted off) 52', Maninho / Cacharamba (substituted off) 82', Gui, Jonas, Zico / Guedes (substituted off) 78', P.Silva – Minhas (substituted on) 52', Betinho (substituted on) 78', Langa (substituted on) 82'

Sun, 16 Nov 1997 F 1L	Petro de Luanda (Angola)	1–0	(Tunisia) Espérance Tunis	Luanda
15:00 WAT (UTC+1)	P.Silva 80'			Stadium: Estádio da Cidadela
Note: Marito / Bodunha, Chico Dinis, Delgado (substituted off) , Maninho / Cacharamba, Gui, Jonas, Minhas (substituted off) / Guedes, Zico — Amaral (substituted on) , Paulo Silva (substituted on)

Sun, Oct 1997 SF 2L	Petro de Luanda (Angola)	4–1	(Nigeria) Jasper United	Luanda
15:00 WAT (UTC+1)	Jonas 28'; P.Silva 32'		89' Paul	Stadium: Estádio da Cidadela
Note: Marito / Bodunha (substituted off) , Chico Dinis, Delgado, Maninho / Cacharamba, Gui, Jonas, Minhas (substituted off) / Paulo Silva, Zico — Amaral (substituted on) , Rabolé (substituted on)

Sun, 12 Oct 1997 SF 1L	Jasper United (Nigeria)	2–1	(Angola) Petro de Luanda	Enugu
15:00 WAT (UTC+1)	Issiani 11' ?		Guedes	Stadium: Enugu Stadium
Note: Marito / Bodunha, Chico Dinis, Delgado, Maninho / Cacharamba, Gui, Jonas, Minhas / Paulo Silva, Zico —

Fri, 19 Sep 1997 QF 2L	Aïn Beïda (Algeria)	1–3	(Angola) Petro de Luanda	Aïn Beïda
15:00 CET (UTC+1)	Abdoulay 32'		59' Minhas; 67' Guedes; P.Silva	Stadium: 24 du Avril
Note: Marito / Bodunha, Chico Dinis, Delgado, Maninho / Cacharamba, Gui, Jonas, Minhas / Guedes (substituted off) , Paulo Silva (substituted off) — Joãozinho (substituted on) , Langa (substituted on)

Sun, 07 Sep 1997 QF 1L	Petro de Luanda (Angola)	2–0	(Algeria) Aïn Beïda	Luanda
15:00 WAT (UTC+1)	Amaral 41'			Stadium: Estádio da Cidadela
Note: Marito / Bodunha, Chico Dinis, Maninho, Paulo Silva / Cacharamba, Gui, Joãozinho (substituted off) , Jonas / Amaral, Betinho (substituted off) — Guedes (substituted on) , Minhas (substituted on)

Sun, 18 May 1997 R2 2L	C&M Sales (Eswatini)	0–2	(Angola) Petro de Luanda	Mbabane
15:00 SAT (UTC+2)			N.Bumba; Cacharamba	Stadium: National Stadium
Note: Mbala / Chico Dinis, Maninho, Rabolé / Amaral, Cacharamba, Gui, Langa / Nelo Bumba, Zico —

Sun, 04 May 1997 R2 1L	Petro de Luanda (Angola)	1–0	(Eswatini) C&M Sales	Luanda
15:00 WAT (UTC+1)	Rabolé (pen.)			Stadium: Estádio da Cidadela
Note: Mbala / Chico Dinis, Delgado, Maninho, Rabolé / Amaral, Cacharamba, Gui, Langa (substituted off) / Nelo Bumba (substituted off) , Zico — Guedes (substituted on) , Minhas (substituted on)

Sat, 22 Mar 1997 R1 2L	AS Cheminots (Republic of the Congo)	1–2	(Angola) Petro de Luanda	Pointe-Noire
15:00 WAT (UTC+1)			Amaral; Guedes	Stadium: Stade Municipal
Note: Marito / Aurélio, Bodunha, Chico Dinis, Delgado / Cacharamba, Gui, Nelo Bumba, Zico / Amaral, Guedes —

Sun, 08 Mar 1997 R1 1L	Petro de Luanda (Angola)	5–0	(Republic of the Congo) AS Cheminots	Luanda
15:00 WAT (UTC+1)	Amaral 17' (?); Guedes (?); Zico (?)		27' Koss	Stadium: Estádio da Cidadela
Note: Marito / Aurélio, Bodunha, Chico Dinis, Delgado / Cacharamba, Gui, Minhas, Zico (substituted off) / Amaral (substituted off) , Guedes — Joãozinho (substituted on) , Nelo Bumba (substituted on)

== 1996 Cup of Champions Clubs ==
Sat, 21 Sep 1996 R1 2L	JS Kabylie (Algeria)	1–0	(Angola) Petro de Luanda	Algiers
15:00 WAT (UTC+1)				Stadium: 5 Juillet

Sun, 8 Sep 1996 R1 1L	Petro de Luanda (Angola)	1–1	(Algeria) JS Kabylie	Luanda
15:00 WAT (UTC+1)	Amaral			Stadium: Cidadela

Sun, 19 May 1996 R1 1L	Petro de Luanda (Angola)	3–0	(Rwanda) APR FC	Luanda
15:00 WAT (UTC+1)	Amaral; Guedes; Paulo			Stadium: Cidadela

Sat, 4 May 1996 R1 2L	APR FC (Rwanda)	2–0	(Angola) Petro de Luanda	Kigali
15:00 WAT (UTC+1)			Zico	Stadium: Amahoro Stadium

Fri, 22 Mar 1996 R1 2L	Black Africa (Namibia)	1–1	(Angola) Petro de Luanda	Windhoek
15:00 WAT (UTC+1)			Zico	Stadium: Independence Stadium

Sun, 10 Mar 1996 R1 1L	Petro de Luanda (Angola)	2–0	(Namibia) Black Africa	Luanda
15:00 WAT (UTC+1)	Cacharamba; Bodunha			Stadium: Cidadela

== 1995 Cup of Champions Clubs ==
Sun, 19 Mar 1995 R1 2L	ASEC Mimosas (Ivory Coast)	3–1	(Angola) Petro de Luanda	Abidjan
15:00 WAT (UTC+1)	Paulo 5' (o.g.); Bamba 39', 69'		14' Rosário	Stadium: F. Houphouët-Boigny
Note: Marito / Aurélio, Bodunha, Chico Dinis, Paulo / Clarindo, Felito, Libengué (substituted off) , Rosário / Amaral, Nelo Bumba (substituted off) — Serginho (substituted on) , Zacarias (substituted on)

Sun, 05 Mar 1995 R1 1L	Petro de Luanda (Angola)	1–2	(Ivory Coast) ASEC Mimosas	Luanda
15:00 WAT (UTC+1)	Kabongo 12'		60' Omel; 65' Bamba	Stadium: Cidadela
Note: Marito / Aurélio, Bodunha, Chico Dinis, Paulo / Amaral (substituted off) , Felito, Rosário, Zacarias (substituted off) / Kabongó, Nelo Bumba — Luís Bento (substituted on) , Serginho (substituted on)

== 1994 Cup of Champions Clubs ==
Fri, 04 Mar 1994 R1 2L	AS Sogara (Gabon)	2–1	(Angola) Petro de Luanda	Libreville
15:00 WAT (UTC+1)			N.Bumba	Stadium: Omar Bongo
Note: Hélder / Bodunha, Chico Dinis, Paulo, Oliveira / Clarindo, Felito, Rosário / Amaral, Libengué, Nelo Bumba —

Sun, 20 Feb 1994 R1 1L	Petro de Luanda (Angola)	0–0	(Gabon) AS Sogara	Luanda
15:00 WAT (UTC+1)				Stadium: Cidadela
Note: Hélder / Bodunha, Chico Dinis, Paulo, Oliveira / Clarindo (substituted off) , Felito, Libengué (substituted off) , Rosário / Amaral, Nelo Bumba — Paulito (substituted on) , Zezinho (substituted on)

== 1993 Cup Winners' Cup ==
Sat, 29 May 1993 R2 2L	Petro de Luanda (Angola)	2–2	(Zaire) Motema Pembe	Luanda
15:00 WAT (UTC+1)	Amaral; Avelino			Stadium: Estádio da Cidadela
Note: Hélder / Bodunha, Chico Dinis, Willy / Avelino, Felito, Rosário / Amaral, Paulito, Zacarias — Paulito (substituted on)

Sun, 16 May 1993 R2 1L	Motema Pembe (Zaire)	0–0	(Angola) Petro de Luanda	Kinshasa
15:00 WAT (UTC+1)				Stadium: Stade du 20 Mai
Note: Hélder / Bodunha, Chico Dinis, Paulo, Willy / Avelino, Clarindo, Felito, Rosário, Zacarias (substituted off) / Amaral — Paulito (substituted on)

Sun, 28 Mar 1993 R2 1L	Petro de Luanda (Angola)	3–1	(Republic of the Congo) CARA Brazzaville	Luanda
15:00 WAT (UTC+1)	N.Bumba 76'; Paulito 90'		61' (pen.) ?	Stadium: Estádio da Cidadela
Note: Hélder / Bodunha, Chico Dinis, Willy, Zacarias / Antoninho (substituted off) , Clarindo, Felito (substituted off) , Rosário / Amaral, Nelo Bumba — Nejó (substituted on) , Paulito (substituted on)

Sun, 14 Mar 1993 R1 2L	CARA Brazzaville (Republic of the Congo)	1–0	(Angola) Petro de Luanda	Pointe-Noire
15:00 WAT (UTC+1)	? (pen.)			Stadium: Stade Municipal
Note: Hélder / Bodunha, Paulo (substituted off) , Ralph, Willy / Clarindo (substituted off) , Felito, Rosário / Nelo Bumba, Zacarias — Antoninho (substituted on) , Patrick (substituted on)

Sun, 21 Feb 1993 PR 2L	Petro de Luanda (Angola)	1–1	(Central African Republic) Tempête Mocaf	Luanda
15:00 WAT (UTC+1)	Felito (pen.)		14' Kouali	Stadium: Cidadela
Note: Lúcio / Bodunha, Chico Dinis, Nejó, Willy / Clarindo, Felito, Rosário, Tchicangala (substituted off) / Amaral, Nelo Bumba — Antoninho (substituted on)

Sun, 07 Feb 1993 PR 1L	Tempête Mocaf (Central African Republic)	1–2	(Angola) Petro de Luanda	Bangui
15:00 WAT (UTC+1)	Tchimé 41'		30' Clarindo; 63' Amaral	Stadium: Barthélemy Boganda
Note: Marito / Bodunha, Chico Dinis, Nejó, Willy / Clarindo, Felito, Rosário, Tchicangala / Amaral, Nelo Bumba —

== 1992 Cup Winners' Cup ==
Sun, 29 Mar 1992 R2 1L	Motema Pembe (Zaire)	1–0 (4–3 p)	(Angola) Petro de Luanda	Kinshasa
15:00 WAT (UTC+1)	Ngoma			Stadium: Stade du 20 Mai
	Penalties
	? (penalty scored) ? (penalty scored) ? (penalty scored) ? (penalty scored)		(penalty scored) B.da Rosa; (penalty scored) Felito; (penalty scored) Q.Sebas; (penalty missed) Avelino; (penalty missed) Ralph
Note: Orlando (substituted off) / Bravo da Rosa, Chico Dinis, Nejó, Quim Sebas, Rasgado / Avelino, Felito, Zacarias (substituted off) / Mané, Nelo Bumba — Lúcio (substituted on) , Ralph (substituted on)

Sun, 15 Mar 1992 R2 2L	Petro de Luanda (Angola)	1–0	(Zaire) Motema Pembe	Luanda
15:00 WAT (UTC+1)	Felito 53' (pen.)			Stadium: Estádio da Cidadela
Note: Orlando / Bravo da Rosa, Chico Dinis, Nejó, Rasgado / Avelino, Felito, Mané, Zacarias (substituted off) / Nelo Bumba (substituted off) , Rosário — Bodunha (substituted on) , Ralph (substituted on)

== 1991 Cup of Champions Clubs ==
Sun, 26 May 1991 R2 2L	ASEC Mimosas (Ivory Coast)	1–0 (3–1 p)	(Angola) Petro de Luanda	Abidjan
15:00 WAT (UTC+1)	Bassolé			Stadium: F. Houphouët-Boigny
Note: Orlando / Chico Dinis, Nejó, Quim Sebas, Rasgado, Wilson / Avelino (substituted off) , Carlos Pedro, Felito, Ndunguidi / Luizinho, Mona —

Sat, 11 May 1991 R2 1L	Petro de Luanda (Angola)	1–0	(Ivory Coast) ASEC Mimosas	Luanda
15:00 WAT (UTC+1)	Ndunguidi 70' (pen.)			Stadium: Cidadela
Note: Orlando / Chico Dinis, Nejó, Rasgado, Wilson / Avelino (substituted off) , Carlos Pedro, Jesus, Ndunguidi / Mona, Paulito (substituted off) — Lusinho (substituted on) , Wilson (substituted on)

Mon, 01 Apr 1991 R1 2L	Petro de Luanda (Angola)	3–1	(Ghana) Hearts of Oak	Luanda
15:00 WAT (UTC+1)	Paulito; Ndunguidi			Stadium: Cidadela
Note: Orlando / Chico Dinis, Nejó, Quim Sebas, Wilson / André, Carlos Pedro, Felito, Ndunguidi / Luizinho, Mona —

Sat, 16 Mar 1991 R1 1L	Hearts of Oak (Ghana)	4–2	(Angola) Petro de Luanda	Yaoundé
15:00 WAT (UTC+1)			Mona; C.Pedro	Stadium: Ahmadou Ahidjo
Note: Orlando / Chico Dinis, Nejó, Quim Sebas, Wilson / André, Carlos Pedro, Felito, Ndunguidi / Luizinho, Mona —

Mon, 18 Feb 1991 PR 2L	Petro de Luanda (Angola)	4–0	(Central African Republic) Tempête Mocaf	Luanda
15:00 WAT (UTC+1)	Ndunguidi 11'; Paulito 37'; Mona 47'; André			Stadium: Cidadela
Note: Orlando / Chico Dinis, Mané, Nejó, Quim Sebas / André, Carlos Pedro, Felito, Ndunguidi / Luizinho (substituted off) , Mona — Paulito (substituted on)

Mon, 04 Feb 1991 PR 1L	Tempête Mocaf (Central African Republic)	2–4	(Angola) Petro de Luanda	Bangui
15:00 WAT (UTC+1)			Paulito; Mona	Stadium: Stade Municipal
Note: Orlando / Chico Dinis, Mané, Nejó, Quim Sebas / André, Carlos Pedro, Felito, Ndunguidi / Mona, Paulito —

== 1990 Cup of Champions Clubs ==
Sun, 22 Apr 1990 R1 2L	Petro de Luanda (Angola)	1–1 (5–6 p)	(Zimbabwe) Dynamos Harare	Luanda
15:00 WAT (UTC+1)	Paulito 13'		90' Muchongwe	Stadium: Cidadela
	Penalties
	Paulão (penalty scored); Ralph (penalty scored); Nejó (penalty missed); Avelino (penalty missed); Rasgado (penalty missed)
Note: Orlando / Nejó, Janguelito, Ralph, Wilson / Carlos Pedro, Esquerdinho, Ndunguidi (substituted off) / Paulito, Mona — Avelino (substituted on)

Mon, 09 Apr 1990 R1 1L	Dynamos Harare (Zimbabwe)	1–1	(Angola) Petro de Luanda	Harare
15:00 WAT (UTC+1)	Garikai 25'		36' Paulão	Stadium: National Stadium
Note: Orlando / Nejó, Janguelito, Ralph, Rasgado / Avelino, Carlos Pedro, Ndunguidi, Paulão / André, Mona —

Sun, 18 Feb 1990 PR 2L	Petro de Luanda (Angola)	3–0	(Burundi) Inter Star	Luanda
15:00 WAT (UTC+1)	Mona; Rasgado; André			Stadium: Cidadela
Note: Orlando / Nejó, Janguelito, Ralph, Rasgado (substituted off) / Avelino, Carlos Pedro, Esquerdinho (substituted off) / Mona, Ndunguidi, Paulito — André (substituted on) , Wilson (substituted on)

Sat, 03 Feb 1990 PR 1L	Inter Star (Burundi)	2–0	(Angola) Petro de Luanda	Bujumbura
15:00 WAT (UTC+1)	Saidi 3' (pen.), 38' (pen.)		(red card) 37' Lúcio	Stadium: Prince Louis; Referee: Jonathan Gatera (Rwanda)
Note: Lúcio / Nejó, Quim Sebas, Ralph, Rasgado (substituted off) / Carlos Pedro, Esquerdinho, Ndunguidi (substituted off) , Paulão / Luizinho, Mona — André (substituted on) , Orlando (substituted on)

== 1989 Cup of Champions Clubs ==
Sun, 02 Apr 1989 R1 2L	Petro de Luanda (Angola)	2–2	(Republic of the Congo) Inter Brazzaville	Luanda
15:00 WAT (UTC+1)	C.Pedro 9'; Mona		10' ? 28' Mabiala	Stadium: Cidadela
Note: P.Lourenço / Nejó, Quim Sebas, Rasgado, Wilson (substituted off) / Carlos Pedro, Janguelito, Paulão, Ralph / Mona, Norberto — Adinho (substituted on) , Bolingó (substituted on)

Sun, 19 Mar 1989 R1 1L	Inter Brazzaville (Republic of the Congo)	2–1	(Angola) Petro de Luanda	Brazzaville
15:00 WAT (UTC+1)			Mona	Stadium: Stade de la Revolution
Note: Lúcio / Nejó, Quim Sebas, Rasgado, Wilson / Carlos Pedro, Janguelito, Paulão (substituted off) , Ralph / Bolingó, Mona (substituted off) — Luizinho (substituted on) , Norberto (substituted on)

== 1988 Cup of Champions Clubs ==
Sun, 05 Jun 1988 R2 2L	Petro de Luanda (Angola)	2–1	(Ivory Coast) Africa Sports	Luanda
15:00 WAT (UTC+1)	Paulão 9'; Antoninho 87'		88' Smith	Stadium: Cidadela
Note: Lúcio / Nejó, Quim Sebas, Rasgado, Wilson / Avelino, Ndongala, Paulão / Abel, Jesus, Saavedra — Antoninho

Mon, 23 May 1988 R2 1L	Africa Sports (Ivory Coast)	3–0	(Angola) Petro de Luanda	Abidjan
15:00 WAT (UTC+1)				Stadium: F. Houphouët-Boigny
Note: Lúcio / Nejó, Quim Sebas, Rasgado, Wilson / Barbosa, Ndongala, Paulão / Abel, Jesus, Saavedra —

Sun, 24 Apr 1988 R1 2L	TP Mazembe (Zaire)	0–1	(Angola) Petro de Luanda	Lubumbashi
15:00 WAT (UTC+1)			56' Abel	Stadium: Mobutu Sese Seko
Note: Lúcio / Nejó, Quim Sebas, Rasgado, Wilson / Barbosa, Ndongala, Paulão / Abel, Jesus, Saavedra —

Sun, 10 Apr 1988 R1 1L	Petro de Luanda (Angola)	2–1	(Zaire) TP Mazembe	Luanda
15:00 WAT (UTC+1)	Jesus 36'; Saavedra 45'		75' Kayembe	Stadium: Cidadela
Note: Lúcio / Nejó, Quim Sebas, Rasgado, Wilson / Avelino, Barbosa, Ndongala / Abel, Jesus, Saavedra —

== 1987 Cup of Champions Clubs ==
Sun, 22 Mar 1987 R1 2L	Petro de Luanda (Angola)	0–1	(Zambia) Nkana Red Devils	Luanda
15:00 WAT (UTC+1)			78' Phiri	Stadium: Cidadela
Note: Lúcio / Nejó, Quim Sebas, Rasgado, Sto António / Abel, Antoninho, Balalau / Avelino (substituted off) , Jesus, Saavedra — Ofualuka (substituted on)

Sun, 08 Mar 1987 R1 1L	Nkana Red Devils (Zambia)	1–1	(Angola) Petro de Luanda	Kitwe
15:00 WAT (UTC+1)			Abel	Stadium: Kitwe Stadium
Note: Lúcio / Nejó, Quim Sebas, Rasgado, Sto António / Antoninho, Avelino, Balalau / Abel, Jesus, Saavedra (substituted off) — Paulão (substituted on)

Sun, 22 Feb 1987 PR 2L	Maxaquene (Mozambique)	0–1	(Angola) Petro de Luanda	Maputo
15:00 WAT (UTC+1)			27' S^{to} António	Stadium: Estádio da Machava
Note: Lúcio / Nejó, Quim Sebas, Rasgado, Sto António / Antoninho, Avelino, Balalau / Abel, Jesus, Saavedra (substituted off) — Paulão (substituted on)

Wed, 04 Feb 1987 PR 1L	Petro de Luanda (Angola)	3–1	(Mozambique) Maxaquene	Luanda
15:00 WAT (UTC+1)	Balalau 47' (pen.); Nejó 82'; S^{to} António 90'		44' Elias	Stadium: Coqueiros
Note: Lúcio / Nejó, Quim Sebas, Rasgado, Sto António (c) / Abel, Antoninho (substituted off) 77', Balalau / Avelino, Jesus, Saavedra (substituted off) 65' — Paulão (substituted on) 65', Haia (substituted on) 77'

== 1985 Cup of Champions Clubs ==
Sun, 24 Mar 1985 R1 2L	Petro de Luanda (Angola)	1–2	(Nigeria) Enugu Rangers	Luanda
15:00 WAT (UTC+1)	Haia 45'		30' Oknwo II; 41' Akabueze	Stadium: Coqueiros; Referee: Jean-Fidèle Diramba, Jean-Claude Biyoghé, Jean-Paul Mapangou (Gabon)
Note: Tozé / Chico Afonso, Pedro Ferro (substituted off) *', Sto António, Wilson / Antoninho, Avelino, Makuéria / Abel, Jesus, Lito (substituted off) 45' — Nsumbo (substituted on) *', Haia (substituted on) 45'

Fri, 29 Mar 1985 R1 1L	Enugu Rangers (Nigeria)	2–0	(Angola) Petro de Luanda	Enugu
15:00 WAT (UTC+1)	Zé Luís (o.g.) ?			Stadium: Nnamdi Azikiwe
Note: Tozé / Chico Afonso, Pedro Ferro, Sto António, Zé Luís / Antoninho, Avelino, Makuéria / Abel, Jesus, Lito —

Sun, 24 Feb 1985 PR 2L	Tempête Mocaf (Central African Republic)	1–1	(Angola) Petro de Luanda	Bangui
15:00 WAT (UTC+1)	Koumba 63'		70' Antoninho	Stadium: Stade Municipal
Note: Tozé / Chico Afonso, Pedro Ferro, Sto António, Wilson / Antoninho, Avelino, Makuéria / Abel, Bavi, Jesus —

Sun, 10 Feb 1985 PR 1L	Petro de Luanda (Angola)	4–1	(Central African Republic) Tempête Mocaf	Luanda
15:00 WAT (UTC+1)	Jesus 4', 70', 90+2' (pen.); Bavi 68'		64' Koumba	Stadium: Coqueiros; Referee: Biaya (Zaire)
Note: Tozé / Chico Afonso, Pedro Ferro, Sto António, Wilson / Antoninho (substituted off) *', Avelino (substituted off) **', Lito / Abel, Bavi, Jesus — Nejó (substituted on) *', Paulão (substituted on) **'

== 1983 Cup of Champions Clubs ==
Sun, 22 May 1983 R2 1L	Canon Yaoundé (Cameroon)	4–3	(Angola) Petro de Luanda	Yaoundé
15:00 WAT (UTC+1)			Jesus; Lufemba	Stadium: Ahmadou Ahidjo; Attendance: 80,000
Note: Tozé / Bodú, Chico Afonso, Nsumbo, Porto / Afonso, Avelino, Lufemba, Haia / Abel (substituted off) , Jesus — Lito (substituted on)

Sun, 08 May 1983 R2 2L	Petro de Luanda (Angola)	0–0	(Cameroon) Canon Yaoundé	Luanda
15:00 WAT (UTC+1)				Stadium: Coqueiros; Referee: Jean-Fidèle Diramba (Gabon)
Note: Kuba / Bodú, Chico Afonso, Nsumbo, Porto / Afonso, Lufemba (substituted off) , Pepé / Abel (substituted off) , Jesus, Laika — Dico (substituted on) , Haia (substituted on)

Sun, 27 Mar 1983 R1 2L	Olympic Real (Central African Republic)	2–3	(Angola) Petro de Luanda	Kinshasa
15:00 WAT (UTC+1)	Mamouwagba 30'; Mendez 40'		69' Lufemba; 83' Dico; 87' Abel	Stadium: Stade du 20 Mai; Referee: Paul-Alain Hioba Hioba; Kandem, Esoppi André (Cameroon)
Note: To Zé / Bodú, Chico Afonso, Dico, Porto / Abel, Lufemba (substituted off) 87', Jesus / Laika, Lito (substituted off) 46' — Pepé (substituted on) 46', Franco (substituted on) 87'

Sun, 13 Mar 1983 R1 1L	Petro de Luanda (Angola)	3–1	(Central African Republic) Olympic Real	Luanda
15:00 WAT (UTC+1)	Jesus 21', 44'; Kpéko 33' (o.g.)		65' Mendez	Stadium: Coqueiros; Referee: Denis Obambet (Congo); Gaston Engoa, (Congo) Mário da Ressureição (Angola)
Note: To Zé / Bodú, Chico Afonso, Nsumbo, Porto / Dico, Lufemba, Pepé (substituted off) / Abel, Avelino, Jesus — Laika (substituted on)

== Friendlies ==
In 1987, a four-team tournament marking the 10th anniversary of Angolan state-owned oil company Sonangol, the official sponsor of Petro de Luanda, was held in Luanda with the participation of FC Porto, S.L. Benfica and Vasco da Gama. Petro won the tournament by beating F.C. Porto 2-0 and beating Benfica on penalties after a scoreless draw at the end of regular time.

On the occasion of the 2nd Congress of the ruling party, the MPLA, Sporting da Praia from Cape Verde was invited to play a series of matches in Angola.

Sat, 23 Nov 1985	Petro de Luanda (Angola)	1–0	(Cape Verde) Sporting da Praia	Luanda
15:00 WAT (UTC+1)	Jesus 60'			Stadium: Coqueiros; Referee: João Mavunza, João Tundulo

In February 1985, Fluminense was invited to play friendly games in Luanda and Huambo against Petro and Mambroa, to mark the 24th anniversary of the beginning of the armed struggle by the MPLA guerrilla against colonialism.

Mon, 04 Feb 1985	Petro de Luanda (Angola)	0–2	(Brazil) Fluminense FC	Luanda
15:00 WAT (UTC+1)			Roberto; Assis	Stadium: Coqueiros; Referee: Pereira Lopes, Manuel Fernandes, Mário da Ressureição
Note: Tozé / Nejó, Makuéria, Pedro Ferro, Santo António, Wilson / Antoninho, Haia (substituted off) , Paulão / Lito, Rasgado — Avelino (substituted on)
