= Odita =

- Gender: Male
- Language: Igbo

Origin
- Origin: Nigerian
- Meaning: Wealthy Defender, Protector of Prosperity.
- Region of origin: South East, Nigeria

Odita is a Nigerian surname. It is a male name of Igbo origin, whose meaning is "Wealthy Defender, Protector of Prosperity." The name Odita is common among the Enugu people of the Southeast, Nigeria.

== Notable individuals with the name ==
- Obiora Odita (born 1983), Nigerian footballer
- Okechukwu Odita (born 1983), Nigerian footballer
- Odili Donald Odita (born 1966), Nigerian American abstract painter
