= Dias Caires =

Angolan footballer (born 1978)

Personal information
- Full name: Yahenda Joaquim Caires Fernandes
- Date of birth: April 18, 1978 (age 48)
- Place of birth: Angola
- Position: Defender

Team information
- Current team: Interclube Luanda

Senior career*
Years	Team	Apps	(Gls)
2001–2004	Petro Atlético Luanda		
2005–2007	AS Aviação Luanda		
2008–2009	Sagrada Esperança Dundo		
2010	Interclube Luanda		

International career
2001–2010	Angola	14	(0)
- * Club domestic league appearances and goals

Yahenda Joaquim Caires Fernandes, also known as Dias Caires (born April 18, 1978) is an Angolan former football player. He has played for Angola national team.Caires was included in the Angola's squad for the 2010 Africa Cup of Nations.

== National team statistics ==
Angola national team
Year	Apps	Goals
2001	4	0
2002	4	0
2003	2	0
2004	0	0
2005	0	0
2006	0	0
2007	0	0
2008	0	0
2009	2	0
2010	2	0
Total	14	0
