= Kapela Mbiyavanga =

Congolese footballer (born 1976)

Personal information
- Date of birth: 12 February 1976 (age 50)
- Place of birth: Kinshasa, Zaire
- Position: Forward

Senior career*
Years	Team	Apps	(Gls)
1994–1999	DC Motema Pembe		
2000–2009	AP Luanda		
2005	→ Maritzburg United (loan)	0	(0)
2007	→ Primeiro de Agosto (loan)		
2008	→ Kabuscorp SC (loan)		
2009	Kabuscorp SC		

International career
1995–2002	DR Congo	53	(15)
- * Club domestic league appearances and goals

Kapela Mbiyavanga (born 12 February 1976) is a Congolese former professional footballer who played as a forward.

== International career ==
Mbiyavanga was part of the 2002 African Cup of Nations squad which lost to Senegal.
