= Luizinho (Angolan footballer) =

Angolan footballer (born 1969)

Personal information
- Full name: Luis Domingos Antonio Cazengue
- Date of birth: 11 August 1969 (age 57)
- Place of birth: Portuguese Angola
- Height: 1.75 m (5 ft 9 in)
- Position: Forward

Senior career*
Years	Team	Apps	(Gls)
1986–1992	Petro Atlético		
1992–1993	Lusitano G.C.		
1993–1994	C.D. Fátima		
1995–1996	Braga	26	(2)
1996–1997	SC Lamego	6	(2)
1996–1998	Académico de Viseu FC	45	(7)
1998–1999	Caçadores das Taipas		
1999–2000	Lusitânia F.C.	29	(3)
2000–2001	Caçadores das Taipas		
2001–2002	F.C. Oliveira do Hospital	12	(0)
2002	→ Toronto Supra (loan)	10	(2)

International career
1996	Angola	1	(0)
- * Club domestic league appearances and goals

Luis Domingos Antonio Cazengue (born August 11, 1969), nicknamed Luizinho, is a former Angolan footballer who began his career in Angola, and played primarily in Portugal.

== Playing career ==
Cazengue began his career with Atlético Petróleos de Luanda in the Girabola. During his tenure with Luanda he won the Girabola league title five times from 1986 to 1990, and won the Taça de Angola in 1987, and 1992. In 1992, he went abroad to Portugal to sign with Lusitano G.C. of the Segunda Liga. In 1993, he had a tenure with C.D. Fátima. The following season, he signed with S.C. Braga of the Primeira Liga, where he appeared in 26 matches and scored two goals. After his tenure in the Primeira Liga he spend time with SC Lamego, Académico de Viseu FC, Clube Caçadores das Taipas, Lusitânia F.C., and F.C. Oliveira do Hospital. In 2002, he was loaned to Toronto Supra of the Canadian Professional Soccer League. He made his debut on August 29, 2002, in a match against Durham Flames, and scored a goal in a 5–2 victory. Unfortunately during his tenure with Toronto the club finished last in the Eastern Conference, and failed to clinch a postseason berth.

== International career ==
Cazengue was selected for the Angola national football team roster for the 1996 African Cup of Nations. He made an appearance in the tournament against South Africa, where Angola lost the match to a score of 1–0.

== Honours ==
=== Club ===
Petro Atlético

- Girabola: 1986, 1987, 1988, 1989, 1990
- Taça de Angola: 1987, 1992
