= Manuel Jamuana =

Angolan footballer (born 1984)

Personal information
- Full name: Manuel Alexandre Jamuana
- Date of birth: 23 November 1984 (age 41)
- Place of birth: Angola
- Height: 5 ft 11 in (1.80 m)
- Position: Right full back

Senior career*
Years	Team	Apps	(Gls)
- Petro Atlético
2013–2015	ASA		

International career^{‡}
2008–	Angola	6	(0)
- * Club domestic league appearances and goals as of 15 January 2010 ‡ National team caps and goals as of 15 January 2010

Manuel Alexandre Jamuana (born 23 November 1984), known simply as Jamuana, is an Angolan footballer who plays as a defender. He also represented the Angolan national team at the 2010 Africa Cup of Nations.

== Career ==
Jamuana played for Atlético do Namibe before joining ASA for the second half of the 2013 season.
