= Renato Campos =

Angolan footballer (born 1980)

Personal information
- Date of birth: September 5, 1980 (age 46)
- Place of birth: Luanda, Angola
- Position: Defender

Youth career
- 1994–1996: G.D. Nocal
- 1997–1998: Petro Atlético

Senior career*
Years	Team	Apps	(Gls)
1998–2003	Petro Atlético		
2004	ASA		
2005–2011	Petro Atlético		

International career
1999–2003	Angola	29	(0)
- * Club domestic league appearances and goals

Renato Baptista Campos (born September 5, 1980) is a retired Angolan football player. He has played for the Angolan national team.

== National team statistics ==
Angola national team
Year	Apps	Goals
1999	4	0
2000	4	0
2001	11	0
2002	3	0
2003	1	0
Total	23	0
