= Avelino Lopes =

Coordinates: 10.1369°S 43.9489°W

- Municipality
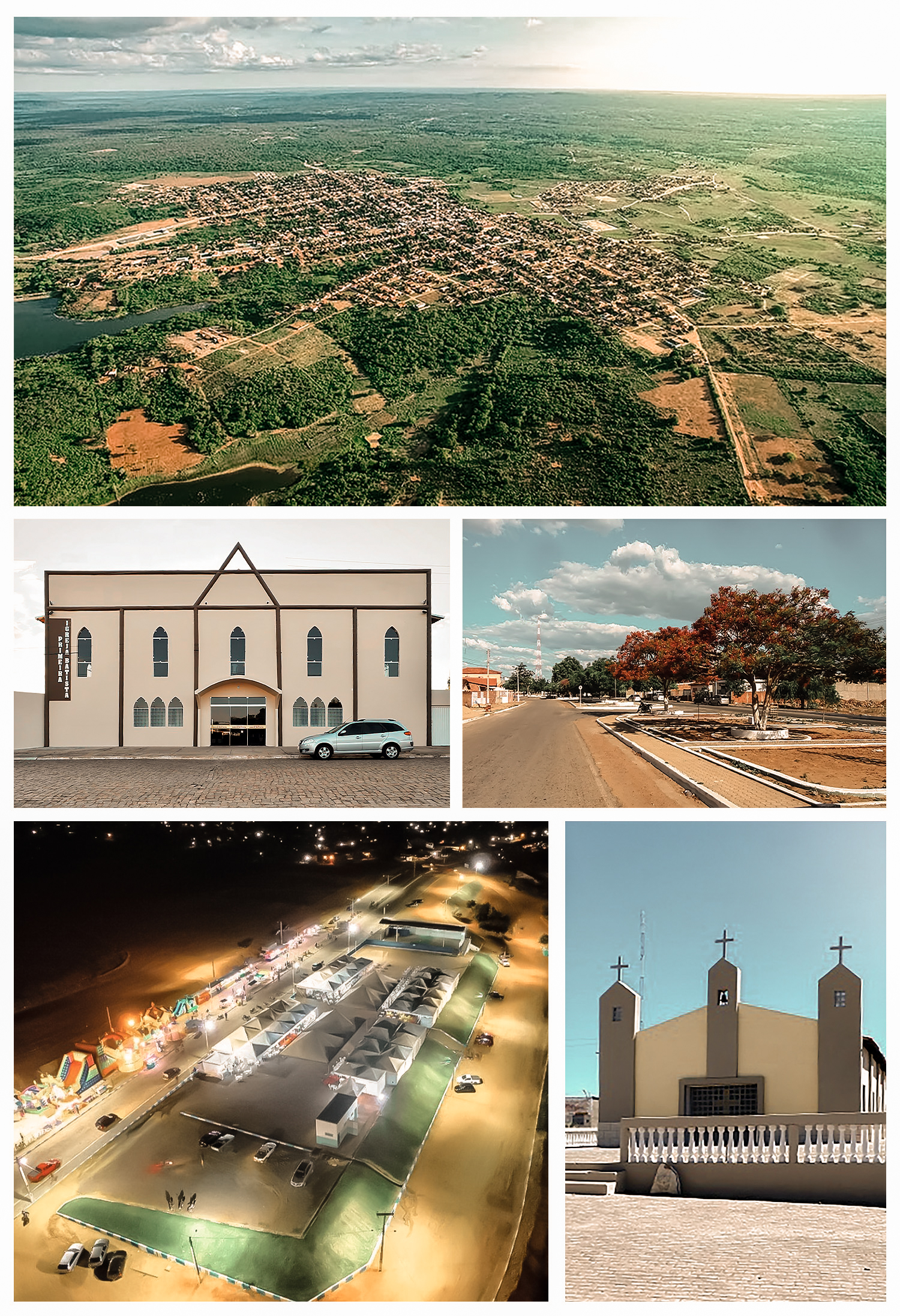
- Location in Piauí

- Flag Coat of arms

- Coordinates: -10, -44
- Country: Brazil
- Region: Northeast
- State: Piauí
- Mesoregion: Southeast
- Elevation: 1,498.2 ft (456.7 m)

Population
  - Total: 11,000
- Time zone: UTC−3 (BRT)
- Postal code: 65964/000
- Area code: +55 89

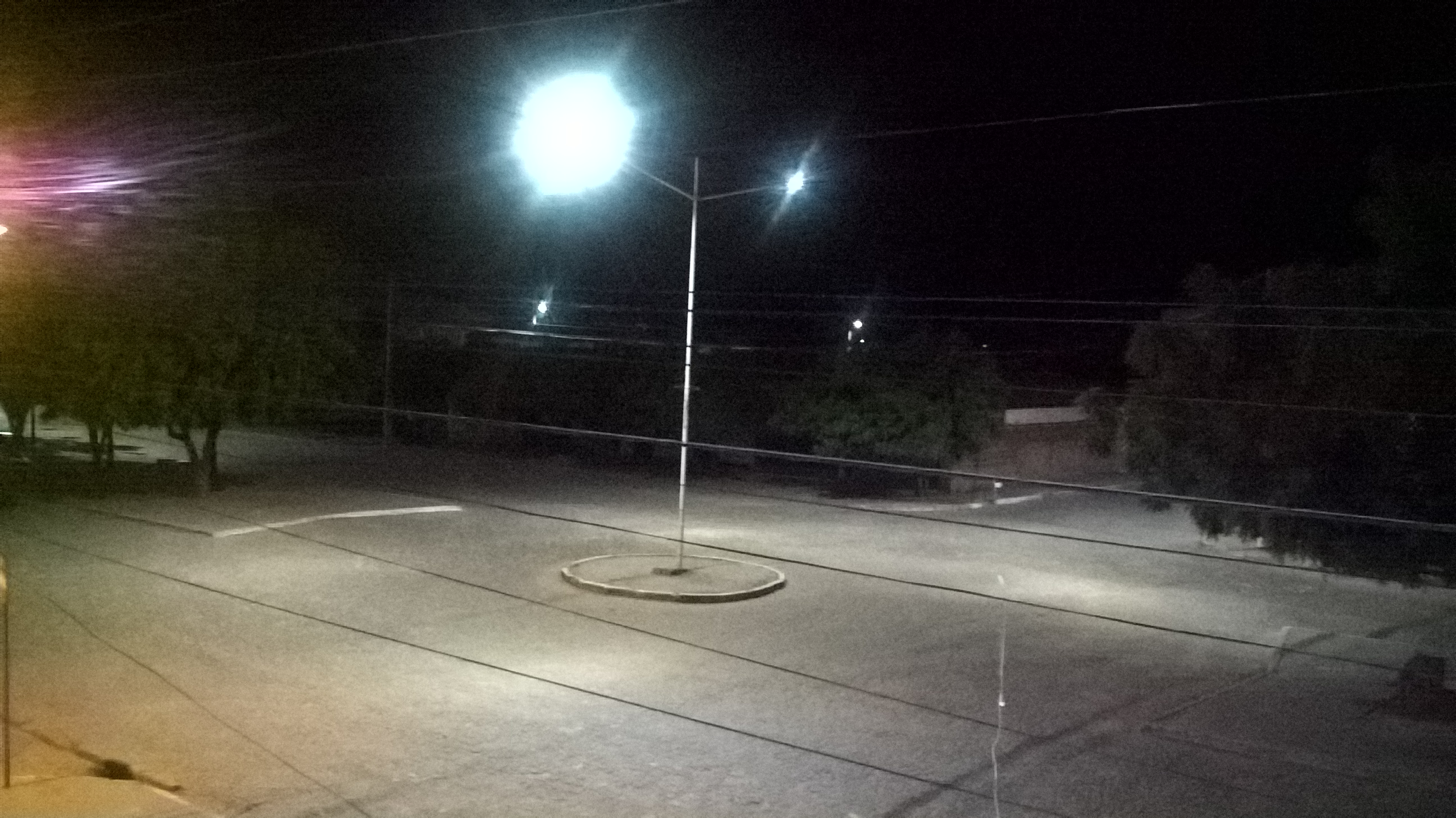
Night on Breath

Avelino Lopes is a municipality in the state of Piauí in the Northeast region of Brazil.
