= Marito =

Angolan footballer

Personal information
- Full name: Mário André Rodrigues João
- Date of birth: August 30, 1977 (age 49)
- Place of birth: Luanda, Angola
- Position: Goalkeeper

Team information
- Current team: Petro de Luanda (assistant coach)

International career
Years	Team	Apps	(Gls)
1995–2003	Angola	33	(0)
Medal record
Men's football
Representing Angola
COSAFA Cup
Winner	2001 Southern Africa
Winner	1999 Southern Africa
Third place	1998 Southern Africa

Mário André Rodrigues João (born August 30, 1977), best known as Marito, is an Angolan retired football goalkeeper. He has played for Angola national team. Now Marito lives in Tokyo, JPN, and keep going his story at soccer clubs.

== National team statistics ==
Angola national team
Year	Apps	Goals
1996		
1997		
1998		
1999	2	0
2000	0	0
2001	4	0
2002	0	0
2003	4	0
Total	10	0

== Honours ==
Angola

- COSAFA Cup: 1999, 2001; 3rd place 1998
