= Elijah Tana =

Zambian footballer (born 1975)

Personal information
- Date of birth: 28 February 1975 (age 51)
- Place of birth: Luanshya, Zambia
- Height: 1.75 m (5 ft 9 in)
- Position: Centre-back

Senior career*
Years	Team	Apps	(Gls)
1993–2002	Nchanga Rangers		
2003–2006	Petro Atlético		
2006–2007	Al-Jazira		
2007	Al-Merreikh		
2008	Nchanga Rangers		
2009–2010	Caála		

International career
1995–2008	Zambia	101	(4)
- * Club domestic league appearances and goals

Elijah Tana (born 28 February 1975) is a Zambian former professional footballer who played as a centre-back.

== International career ==
Tana represented the Zambia national team at the African Cup of Nations in 2000 and 2006.

== See also ==
- List of men's footballers with 100 or more international caps
