= Bodunha =

Angolan footballer (born 1974)

Personal information
- Full name: Mateus Manuel Agostinho
- Date of birth: 28 July 1974 (age 52)
- Place of birth: Luanda, Angola
- Height: 1.81 m (5 ft 11 1/2 in)
- Position: Right back

Senior career*
Years	Team	Apps	(Gls)
1993–1998	Petro Atlético		
1999–2000	Espinho	30	(2)
2000–2002	Salgueiros	44	(2)
2002–2003	Braga	21	(0)
2003–2004	Maia	27	(1)
2004–2005	Gondomar	16	(0)
2005–2006	Petro Atlético		

International career
1992–2004	Angola	38	(3)

Managerial career
- 2013: Petro Atlético
- 2016: Kabuscorp
- 2021: Petro Atlético
Medal record
Men's football
Representing Angola
COSAFA Cup
Third place	1998 Southern Africa
- * Club domestic league appearances and goals

Mateus Manuel Agostinho (born 28 July 1974), commonly known as Bodunha, is an Angolan retired footballer who played as a right back.

== Club career ==
Born in Luanda, Portuguese Angola, Bodunha started and ended his 13-year professional career at Atlético Petróleos de Luanda. In January 1999 he moved to Portugal, where he would remain seven seasons.

In the latter country's Primeira Liga, Bodunha appeared in 65 games, scoring a combined two goals for S.C. Salgueiros and S.C. Braga. He retired in 2006, at the age of 32.

== International career ==
Bodunha earned 40 caps for Angola, during slightly more than 11 years. He was part of the squad that appeared in the 1998 Africa Cup of Nations, playing in the 0–0 draw against South Africa as the tournament ended in group stage exit.

=== International goals ===
Scores and results list Angola's goal tally first.

No	Date	Venue	Opponent	Score	Result	Competition
1.	10 April 1999	Stade George V, Curepipe, Belgium	Mauritius	1–1	Draw	2000 African Cup of Nations qualifying
2.	28 January 2001	Estádio da Cidadela, Luanda, Angola	Libya	1–1	3–1	2002 World Cup qualification
3.	28 January 2001	Estádio da Cidadela, Luanda, Angola	Libya	2–1	3–1	2002 World Cup qualification

== Honours ==
Angola

- COSAFA Cup: 3rd place 1998
