= António Lebo Lebo =

Angolan footballer (born 1977)

Antônio Lebo Lebo
Personal information
- Full name: Antônio Lebo Lebo
- Date of birth: 29 May 1977 (age 49)
- Place of birth: Malanje, Angola
- Height: 1.87 m (6 ft 2 in)
- Positions: Full-back; defensive midfielder

Senior career*
Years	Team	Apps	(Gls)
2003–2005	Sagrada Esperança		
2005–2007	Petro Atlético		
2009	GR Libolo		

International career
2004–2006	Angola	17	(0)
- * Club domestic league appearances and goals

António Lebo Lebo (born 29 May 1977) is an Angolan former footballer. Lebo Lebo ended his career with Recreativo do Libolo in the Angolan league.

== International career ==
Lebo Lebo was a member of the Angola national team, and was called up to the 2006 FIFA World Cup.
