= Vítor Pereira (footballer, born 1978) =

Portuguese footballer

Personal information
- Full name: Vítor José Joaquim Pereira
- Date of birth: 27 August 1978 (age 48)
- Place of birth: Vieira do Minho, Portugal
- Height: 1.80 m (5 ft 11 in)
- Position: Defensive midfielder

Youth career
- 1989–1992: Vieira
- 1992–1997: Braga

Senior career*
Years	Team	Apps	(Gls)
1997–1999	Braga	2	(0)
1999–2000	Chaves	22	(0)
2000–2002	Extremadura	26	(0)
2002–2005	Moreirense	66	(9)
2005–2006	União Leiria	1	(0)
2007–2008	Petro Atlético		
2008–2009	Olympiakos Nicosia		
2009–2010	Onisilos	5	(0)
2010–2013	Muhlenbach Lusitanos		
2013	Mamer 32		
2014–2015	Sandweiler	13	(0)
Total		135	(9)

Managerial career
- 2012–2013: Blue Boys Muhlenbach
- 2013–2018: Sandweiler
- 2018–2019: US Esch
- 2019: Rodange 91
- 2019–2022: Mamer 32
- 2022–2023: Alisontia Steinsel
- 2023–2024: UNA Strassen
- 2025–2026: Atert Bissen
- * Club domestic league appearances and goals

Vítor José Joaquim Pereira (born 27 August 1978) is a Portuguese former professional footballer who played as a defensive midfielder, and most recently the manager of Luxembourg National Division club FC Atert Bissen.

He amassed Primeira Liga totals of 69 matches and nine goals over six seasons, representing mainly Moreirense. He also appeared in the competition for Braga and União de Leiria.

After retiring in 2015, Pereira worked extensively as a coach in Luxembourg, where he had finished his career.

== Playing career ==
Pereira was born in Vieira do Minho, Braga District. Having had no impact whatsoever in two years at S.C. Braga he moved to the Segunda Liga with G.D. Chaves, after which he signed with CF Extremadura in Spain, also in the second tier.

After his team suffered relegation in 2002, Pereira returned to his country, helping lowly Moreirense F.C. to retain their Primeira Liga status until 2005. He then joined U.D. Leiria, where his competitive input consisted of nine minutes.

Following Angola's participation at the 2006 FIFA World Cup finals, Pereira moved to Atlético Petróleos Luanda and remained at the club two years, after which he moved to Cyprus to continue his career. In 2010 he switched to Luxembourg, representing CS Muhlenbach Lusitanos for three seasons.

== Coaching career ==
Pereira started working as a player-coach with Muhlenbach Lusitanos – renamed FC Blue Boys Muhlenbach in 2012 – also serving in both capacities for some time at his new club US Sandweiler. In May 2018, he was appointed head coach of another side in the country, US Esch.

On 20 August 2019, after three games and as many losses at the helm of FC Rodange 91, Pereira resigned. On 11 November that year, he signed with FC Mamer 32.

Pereira remained in Luxembourg subsequently, being in charge of FC Alisontia Steinsel, FC UNA Strassen and FC Atert Bissen.
