= Okechukwu Odita =

Nigerian footballer

Okey Odita
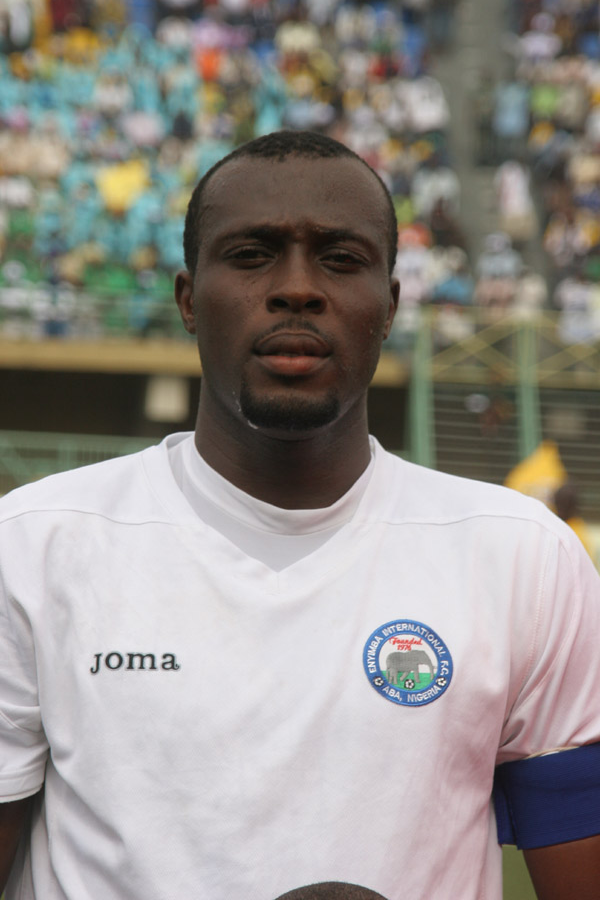

Personal information
- Full name: Okechukwu Odita
- Date of birth: 12 October 1983 (age 43)
- Place of birth: Warri, Nigeria
- Height: 1.83 m (6 ft 0 in)
- Position: Defender

Team information
- Current team: Enugu Rangers International F.C.
- Number: 4

Senior career*
Years	Team	Apps	(Gls)
2003 – 2005	Enugu Rangers		
2006 –	Enyimba International F.C.		
- Enugu Rangers

International career
2004	Nigeria	1	(0)
- * Club domestic league appearances and goals as of 31 December 2006

Okechukwu Odita (born 12 October 1983) is a Nigerian football player currently with Enugu Rangers.

== Career ==
Odita is a Nigerian star defender and was the heart of Rangers’ defence, before moving to Enyimba International F.C. in 2006.

== International ==
Okey played 1 game for Nigeria national football team in 2004.
