= Girabola Club Rankings =

This article aims at showing the ranking of all clubs contested at Girabola, since its first edition in 1979:

== Girabola Club Rankings (1980s) ==
P	Club	1979	1980	1981	1982	1983	1984	1985	1986	1987	1988	1989	Years	Gold medal	Silver medal	Bronze medal
1	Petro de Luanda			P	1		1		1	1	1	1		6	0	0
2	Primeiro de Agosto	1	1	1			3		4					3	0	1
3	Primeiro de Maio			P		1	2	1	10					2	1	0
4	Desportivo da TAAG	3		2			4		9					0	1	1
5	Inter de Luanda						7	3	2					0	1	1
6	Nacional de Benguela	2		3										0	1	1
7	Petro do Huambo			P			6		7	2				0	1	3
8	Desportivo da Chela						8	2	8	R		P		0	1	0
9	Ferroviário da Huíla								3					0	0	1
10	Sagrada Esperança						11		6							
11	Académica do Lobito															
12	Recreativo da Caála															
13	Palancas do Huambo	4														
14	Desportivo da Huíla						5									
15	Progresso do Sambizanga			P						P/R						
16	FC Cabinda								5							
17	Estrela Vermelha (Mambroa)						9		11							
18	Sporting de Benguela															
19	Sassamba											P				
20	Desportivo de Benguela						12		13		P					
21	Gaiatos de Benguela						12									
22	Leões do Planalto						13									
23	Dínamos do Sumbe						14									
24	Diabos Verdes (Leões de Luanda)								12							
25	Inter de Saurimo								14							
26	MCH do Uíge															
27	Santa Rita															
28	14 de Abril	R														
29	Desportivo de Xangongo	R														
30	Diabos Negros	R														
31	FC Mbanza Congo	R														
32	Ginásio do Kuando Kubango	R														
33	Juventude do Kunje	R														
34	Luta SC de Cabinda	R														
35	Makotas de Malanje	R														
36	Naval de Porto Amboim	R														
37	Vitória do Bié	R														
38	União Sport do Bié									P/R						
39	Dínamo do Kwanza Sul									P	R					
40	AS Fabril										P/R					
41	Inter do Namibe										P/R					
42	Desportivo da CUCA											P				

Colour codes:

- Rankings in the green colour mean the club has been promoted
- Rankings in the red colour mean the club has been relegated
- Rankings in the purple colour mean the club has been promoted and relegated in the same season

== Girabola Club Rankings (1990s) ==
P	Club	1990	1991	1992	1993	1994	1995	1996	1997	1998	1999	Years	Gold medal	Silver medal	Bronze medal
1	Petro de Luanda	1		3	1	1	1		1	2	4		5	1	1
2	Primeiro de Agosto	3	1	1				1		1	1		5	0	1
3	Primeiro de Maio	2			2	2							0	3	0
4	Sagrada Esperança	10	2			R		P	2	5	7		0	2	0
5	ASA	12	R	2						3	6		0	1	1
6	Académica do Lobito				P/R		P			10	2		0	1	0
7	Inter de Luanda	7		R							3		0	0	1
8	Independente (Tômbwa)					3				11	14		0	0	1
9	Saneamento Rangol							P		4	8				
10	Ferroviário da Huíla	4		R							16				
11	Petro do Huambo	13					P			9	5				
12	Desportivo da Eka	5						R							
13	Kabuscorp								P	6					
14	Desportivo da CUCA	6	R												
15	Sporting de Cabinda									13	12				
16	Atlético do Namibe									7	10				
17	Progresso do Sambizanga				P					8	15				
18	Benfica do Huambo	8						P	R						
19	FC Cabinda	9			R		P/R		P	12	9				
20	Onze Bravos									14	13				
21	Sporting de Benguela	11		R											
22	Cambondo de Malanje										11				
23	Sassamba da Lunda Sul	14													
24	SECIL									15					
25	Chicoil do Kuando Kubango									16					
26	Desportivo de Saurimo		R												
27	Desportivo da NOCAL			P	R										
28	Inter da Huíla			P		R									
29	Benfica de Cabinda			R											
30	Sporting de Luanda					P	R								
31	Sonangol do Namibe					P	R		P						
32	Sporting do Lubango						P	R							
33	Nacional de Benguela							R							

Colour codes:

- Rankings in the green colour mean the club has been promoted
- Rankings in the red colour mean the club has been relegated
- Rankings in the purple colour mean the club has been promoted and relegated in the same season

== Girabola Club Rankings (2000s) ==
P	Club	2000	2001	2002	2003	2004	2005	2006	2007	2008	2009	2010	2011	2012	2013	2014	2015	Years	Gold medal	Silver medal	3
1	Petro de Luanda	1	1	3	2	4	3	2	3	1	1	4	3	3	4	5	Q	16	4	2	5
2	ASA	2	2	1	1	1	2	5	5	7	7	7	9	6	13	13	Q	16	3	3	0
3	Recreativo do Libolo									3	2	6	1	1	8	1	Q	8	3	1	1
4	Interclube	5	5	5	7	3	7	3	1	10	8	1	4	5	7	9	Q	16	2	0	2
5	Primeiro de Agosto	4	7	2	4	6	4	1	2	2	4	3	6	2	2	4	Q	16	1	5	1
6	Kabuscorp									8	12	8	2	4	1	2	Q	8	1	2	0
7	Sagrada Esperança	9	6	9	11	2	1	6	4	12		11	7	11	5	7	Q	15	1	1	0
8	Recreativo da Caála										9	2	5	10	11	8	Q	7	0	1	0
9	Petro do Huambo	3	3	4	3	7	12		6	13								8	0	0	3
10	Benfica de Luanda	8	9	8	12		5	8	10	5	3	10	13	12	10	3	Q	15	0	0	2
11	Bravos do Maquis	10	13			14		12		11	10	5	8	7	3	6	Q	12	0	0	1
12	Académica do Lobito	7	4	6	6	10	13				14		16				Q	9			
13	Santos FC								11	4	6	13	11	13	16			7			
14	Benfica do Lubango		8	14		13		4	7	14		16				15		7			
15	Atlético do Namibe	6	10	11	5	5	8	11	13					9	15			10			
16	Académica do Soyo					12		9	12		5	9	10	14				7			
17	Primeiro de Maio		14		10	8	6	10	9	6	13		15		12	14		10			
18	Desportivo da Huíla			10	13		11	7	8	9	11	14			6	11	Q	11			
19	Sporting de Cabinda	12		7	9	9	9	14				15		15		12	Q	10			
20	Progresso do Sambizanga		12		8	11	10	13					12	8	9	10	Q	10			
21	FC Cabinda	11	11	12								12	14					5			
22	Sporting do Bié	14		13			14											3			
23	ARA da Gabela	13																1			
24	Porcelana														14			1			
25	Juventude do Moxico								14									1			
26	Ritondo de Malanje				14													1			
27	União SC do Uíge															16		1			
28	Nacional de Benguela													16				1			
29	Domant FC																Q	1			
29	Progresso da Lunda Sul																Q	1			

Colour codes:

- Rankings in the green colour mean the club has been promoted
- Rankings in the red colour mean the club has been relegated
- Rankings in the purple colour mean the club has been promoted and relegated in the same season

== See also ==
Girabola Seasons
