= List of Girabola seasons =

Girabola
- Founded: 1979
- Country: Angola
- Confederation: CAF (Africa)
- Number of clubs: 16
- Level on pyramid: 1
- Relegation to: Segundona
- Current champions: Petro de Luanda (20 titles)
- Current: 2025-26 Girabola

The Girabola is the top level of Angolan association football league system, which began in 1979 following the country's independence.

== Seasons ==
Season	No. of teams	Champion	Top scorer	Notes	Ref(s).
1979	24	Primeiro de Agosto	João Machado (18)		
1980	14	Primeiro de Agosto			
1981	14	Primeiro de Agosto	Joseph Maluka (20)		
1982	14	Petro de Luanda			
1983	14	Primeiro de Maio			
1984	14	Petro de Luanda			
1985	14	Primeiro de Maio			
1986	14	Petro de Luanda			
1987	14	Petro de Luanda			
1988	14	Petro de Luanda			
1989	14	Petro de Luanda			
1990	14	Petro de Luanda			
1991	16	Primeiro de Agosto			
1992	16	Primeiro de Agosto			
1993	12	Petro de Luanda			
1994	12	Petro de Luanda			
1995	14	Petro de Luanda			
1996	13	Primeiro de Agosto			
1997	14	Petro de Luanda	Zé Neli (12)		
1998		Primeiro de Agosto			
1999		Primeiro de Agosto			
2000		Petro de Luanda			
2001		Petro de Luanda			
2002		ASA			
2003		ASA			
2004	14	ASA			
2005					
2006		Primeiro de Agosto			
2007					
2008		Petro de Luanda			
2009		Petro de Luanda			
2010					
2011		Recreativo do Libolo			
2012		Recreativo do Libolo			
2013		Kabuscorp			
2014		Recreativo do Libolo			
2015		Recreativo do Libolo			
2016		Primeiro de Agosto			
2017		Primeiro de Agosto			
2018		Primeiro de Agosto			
2018–19		Primeiro de Agosto			
2019–20		cancelled			
2020–21					
2021–22		Petro de Luanda			
2022–23		Petro de Luanda			
2023–24		Petro de Luanda			
2024-25		Petro de Luanda			
2025-26		Petro de Luanda			
