= Jesus (footballer, born 1956) =

Angolan footballer (born 1956)

Personal information
- Full name: Osvaldo Fernando Saturnino de Oliveira
- Date of birth: 14 January 1956 (age 70)
- Place of birth: Luanda, Angola
- Position: Striker

Youth career
- Clube Atlético de Luanda

Senior career*
Years	Team	Apps	(Gls)
1974	Luanda		
1975	Benfica de Luanda		
1976	Terra Nova		
1977–1988	Petro de Luanda		
1988–1990	Varzim		
1990	Oliveirense		

International career
1979–1990	Angola	48	(18)

Managerial career
- 1995: Petro de Luanda (interim)
- * Club domestic league appearances and goals

Osvaldo Fernando Saturnino de Oliveira (born 14 January 1956), commonly known as Jesus, is an Angolan former football player and coach who played as a striker.

He mainly played for Petro de Luanda and the Angola national team, having also moved to Portugal at Varzim and Oliveirense.

== Club career ==
Jesus played youth football for Clube Atlético de Luanda; he then began playing professionally in 1974 for local club Luanda, before moving to Benfica de Luanda and Terra Nova.

Jesus played over 10 years for Petro de Luanda. He was top goalscorer of the Girabola three times with them, in 1982, 1984 and 1985. In 1988, he moved to Portugal to play for Varzim aged 32, with whom he played two seasons. Jesus then played one season for Oliveirense, retiring in 1990.

== Managerial career ==
Jesus was appointed interim coach of Petro de Luanda, following the death of coach Gojko Zec, helping them win the league title in 1995.

== Presidency career ==
After six terms as vice-president of the Angolan Football Federation, in 2016 Jesus announced his candidacy for president.

== Personal life ==
Jesus and his partner got married in Luanda in 1983; they had a son, Hadja. His idol is Portuguese footballer Cristiano Ronaldo.

== Career statistics ==
=== International ===
Appearances and goals by national team and year
National team	Year	Apps	Goals
Angola	1979	1	1
Angola	1980	3	1
Angola	1981	7	2
Angola	1982	2	0
Angola	1983	2	0
Angola	1984	3	1
Angola	1985	9	6
Angola	1986	2	0
Angola	1987	7	5
Angola	1988	4	0
Angola	1989	5	2
Angola	1990	3	0
Total		48	18

Scores and results list Angola's goal tally first, score column indicates score after each Jesus goal.

List of international goals scored by Jesus
No.	Date	Venue	Opponent	Score	Result	Competition
1	12 July 1979	São Tomé, São Tomé and Príncipe	São Tomé and Príncipe		2–1	International tournament
2	9 November 1980	Luanda, Angola	Mozambique		1–1	International tournament
3	23 August 1981	Luanda, Angola	Gabon	1-1	1–1	1981 Central African Games
4	26 August 1981	Huambo, Angola	Congo		1–3	1981 Central African Games
5	11 November 1984	Luanda, Angola	Congo	1–0	1–0	Friendly
6	19 April 1985	Algiers, Algeria	Algeria	1–2	2–3	1986 FIFA World Cup qualification
7	25 June 1985	Estádio da Machava, Maputo, Mozambique	Mozambique	1–0	3–0	Friendly
8	30 June 1985	Estádio da Várzea, Praia, Cape Verde	São Tomé and Príncipe		3–2	Torneio dos cinco de 1985
9	4 July 1985	Estádio da Várzea, Praia, Cape Verde	Mozambique		2–3	Torneio dos cinco de 1985
10	7 July 1985	Estádio Municipal Adérito Sena, Mindelo, Cape Verde	Mozambique	1–0	1–0	Torneio da Amizade de 1985
11	10 November 1985	Luanda, Angola	Zimbabwe		2–3	Torneio 10 anos de Independencia de 1985
12	12 April 1987	Luanda, Angola	Zaire	1–0	1–0	1988 African Cup of Nations qualification
13	19 April 1987	Brazzaville, Congo	Congo		3–3	1987 Central African Games
14	19 April 1987	Brazzaville, Congo	Congo		3–3	1987 Central African Games
15	21 April 1987	Brazzaville, Congo	Zaire		2–1	1987 Central African Games
16	27 April 1987	Brazzaville, Congo	Gabon	1–0	1–0	1987 Central African Games
17	8 January 1989	Yaoundé, Cameroon	Cameroon	1–0	1–1	1990 FIFA World Cup qualification
18	22 January 1989	Estádio da Cidadela, Luanda, Angola	Nigeria	2–1	2–2	1990 FIFA World Cup qualification

== Honours ==
=== Player ===
Petro de Luanda

- Girabola: 1982, 1984, 1986, 1987, 1988
- Taça de Angola: 1987
- Supertaça de Angola: 1987

Angola

- Central African Games Runner-Up in 1987
- Torneio da Amizade (PALOP) Champion in 1985
- Torneio dos 5: Third place in 1985

Individual

- CAF Legends award: 2009
- Girabola top goalscorer: 1982, 1984, 1985

=== Coach ===
- Girabola: 1995

== See also ==
- List of Angola international footballers
