= António Correia (Angolan footballer) =

Angolan football striker

Antonio Correia
Personal information
- Full name: Antonio Francisco Correia
- Date of birth: 22 August 1983 (age 43)
- Place of birth: Carreira de Tiro, Malanje, Angola
- Height: 1.79 m (5 ft 10 in)
- Position: Striker

Youth career
- Be Quick '28
- Heerenveen

Senior career*
Years	Team	Apps	(Gls)
2002–04	Heerenveen	14	(0)
2005	Emmen	20	(0)
2006–2007	Primeiro de Agosto	25	(2)
2008–2009	Inter Turku	5	(0)
2011	Ajax Cape Town	1	(0)
- * Club domestic league appearances and goals

Antonio "Kito" Correia (born 22 October 1983) is an Angolan football striker who last played for Ajax Cape Town.

== Career ==
Correia left Angola and the civil war for the Netherlands and tried to make a career in SC Heerenveen. His family members had been killed in the war. He debuted in the Eredivisie in April 2003, when he came in as a substitute for Georgios Samaras.

Just after his debut season, he was approached by an agent who told that Benfica was keen to sign him. He was sure that the move was real and didn't show up in Heerenveen for a while. His Dutch club decided to end his contract. Benfica didn't sign him and he had to go to play in a lower league for FC Emmen. He had problems also in Emmen and he decided to back to Angola, where the war had ended.

In 2006, he played for Primeiro de Agosto in the Angolan league. For the season 2008, he was invited for a test period for FC Inter Turku where his former teammate Jos Hooiveld played. He got a two-year contract with the Finnish club. In his first season, he suffered an injury and could play only in 5 matches of the season. His contract expired in December 2009.

On 1 September 2011 he signed a two-year contract at South African outfit Ajax Cape Town. He was recommended by his former coach Foppe de Haan.

== Career statistics ==
Appearances and goals by club, season and competition
Club	Season	League			Cup (Note: Includes KNVB Cup)		Continental		Total	
Club	Season	Division	Apps	Goals	Apps	Goals	Apps	Goals	Apps	Goals
Heerenveen	2002–03	Eredivisie	1	0	0	0	–		1	0
Heerenveen	2003–04	Eredivisie	13	0	1	1	2 (Note: Appearances in UEFA Intertoto Cup)	0	16	1
Heerenveen	Total		14	0	1	1	2	0	17	1
Emmen	2004–05	Eerste Divisie	14	3	0	0	–		14	3
Primeiro de Agosto	2006	Girabola	25	2	–		–		25	2
Inter Turku	2008	Veikkausliiga	5	0	0	0	–		5	0
Ajax Cape Town	2011–12	South African Premiership	1	0	0	0	–		1	0
Career total			59	5	1	1	2	0	62	6

== Honours ==
Primeiro de Agosto

- Girabola: 2006

Inter Turku

- Veikkausliiga: 2008
