= 1983 Girabola =

Girabola 1983
- Season: 1983 (30/5/1983–)
- Champions: 1º de Maio
- Relegated: Académica; Andorinhas; Construtores
- 1984 African Cup of Champions Clubs: 1º de Maio (Girabola winner)
- Matches: 182
- Top goalscorer: Maluka (17 goals)

The 1983 Girabola was the fifth season of top-tier football competition in Angola. Petro de Luanda were the defending champions.

The league comprised 14 teams, the bottom three of which were relegated.

Estrela Clube Primeiro de Maio were crowned champions, winning their 1st title, while Académica do Lobito, Andorinhas do Sumbe and Construtores de Malanje were relegated.

Joseph Maluka of Primeiro de Maio finished as the top scorer with 17 goals.

== Changes from the 1982 season ==
Relegated: Inter da Huíla, M.C.H. do Uíge, Sagrada Esperança
Promoted: Andorinhas do Sumbe, Construtores de Malanje, Petro do Huambo

Locations of the 1983 Girabola teams

== Legal cases ==
Desportivo da Chela was awarded a 2–0 default win in their 9th round home match against Progresso do Sambizanga.

Primeiro de Agosto contested their 4th round 2–1 away match defeat against 1º de Maio. D'Agosto was awarded the right for a rematch. In the rematch, they beat De Maio 3–4.

Académica do Lobito was awarded a 3–0 win by default in their 19th round home match against 1º de Agosto. D'Agosto had travelled to Mozambique for a friendly match against local side Matchedje.

Académica do Lobito was awarded a 3–0 win by default in their 23rd round home match against Mambroa for the latter fielding an ineligible player. Mambroa had originally won 0–1.

== League table ==
| Pos | Team | Pld | W | D | L | GF | GA | GD | Pts | Qualification or relegation |
|---|---|---|---|---|---|---|---|---|---|---|
| 1 | Primeiro de Maio (C) | 26 | 19 | 1 | 6 | 52 | 27 | +25 | 39 | Qualification for Champions Cup |
| 2 | Primeiro de Agosto | 26 | 15 | 6 | 5 | 55 | 28 | +27 | 36 | |
| 3 | Mambroa (Note: Name later reverted to its original Benfica do Huambo) | 26 | 11 | 9 | 6 | 42 | 28 | +14 | 31 | |
| 4 | Progresso do Sambizanga | 26 | 11 | 8 | 7 | 34 | 30 | +4 | 30 | |
| 5 | Petro de Luanda | 25 | 8 | 11 | 6 | 30 | 26 | +4 | 27 | |
| 6 | Inter de Luanda (Note: Name later changed to Interclube) | 25 | 10 | 8 | 7 | 39 | 24 | +15 | 28 | |
| 7 | Desportivo da TAAG (Note: Name later reverted to its original ASA) | 26 | 8 | 11 | 7 | 25 | 29 | −4 | 27 | |
| 8 | Desportivo de Benguela (Note: Name later reverted to its original Sporting de Benguela) | 26 | 7 | 11 | 8 | 32 | 33 | −1 | 25 | |
| 9 | Desportivo da Chela (Note: Name later reverted to its original Benfica do Lubango) | 24 | 8 | 7 | 9 | 23 | 24 | −1 | 23 | |
| 10 | Petro do Huambo | 25 | 6 | 10 | 9 | 18 | 25 | −7 | 22 | |
| 11 | Nacional de Benguela | 25 | 5 | 11 | 9 | 18 | 28 | −10 | 21 | |
| 12 | Académica do Lobito (R) | 24 | 6 | 7 | 11 | 18 | 36 | −18 | 19 | Relegation to Provincial stages |
| 13 | Andorinhas do Sumbe (R) | 26 | 5 | 4 | 17 | 25 | 52 | −27 | 14 | Relegation to Provincial stages |
| 14 | Construtores de Malanje (R) | 24 | 4 | 4 | 16 | 28 | 49 | −21 | 12 | Relegation to Provincial stages |

Updated to match(es) played on 22 November 1983. Source: Girabola.com
Rules for classification: 1) Points; 2) Head-to-head points; 3) Head-to-head goal difference; 4) Goal difference; 5) Goals scored; 6) Fair-play points; 7) Play-off.
(C) Champions; (R) Relegated

== Results ==
| Home \ Away | ACA | AND | CML | DBG | DCH | DTA | INT | MAM | NAC | PET | PHU | PRI | PRM | PRO |
|---|---|---|---|---|---|---|---|---|---|---|---|---|---|---|
| Académica do Lobito | — | 1–0 | 2–1 | 0–0 | – | 0–1 | 0–3 | 3–0 (Note: Académica do Lobito was awarded a 3–0 win) | 1–1 | 1–1 | 1–1 | 2–0 | 0–1 | 0–1 |
| Andorinhas do Sumbe | 3–1 | — | 0–0 | 1–1 | 0–2 | 3–1 | 0–5 | 1–3 | 1–1 | 1–2 | 3–0 | 1–4 | 1–3 | 3–2 |
| Construtores de Malanje | 2–1 | 2–1 | — | 4–3 | 1–0 | 0–1 | 0–1 | 2–3 | 1–3 | – | 1–2 | 1–3 | 2–3 | 1–1 |
| Desportivo de Benguela | 0–0 | 1–2 | 2–2 | — | 1–0 | 2–2 | 1–3 | 2–0 | 0–0 | 0–0 | 3–0 | 1–1 | 1–2 | 1–0 |
| Desportivo da Chela | 2–1 | 3–0 | – | 0–0 | — | 0–0 | 0–2 | 1–1 | 1–0 | 1–0 | 1–0 | 1–2 | 2–3 | 2–0 |
| Desportivo da TAAG | 0–0 | 2–1 | 1–0 | 3–3 | 2–1 | — | 2–1 | 1–1 | 1–1 | 0–1 | 2–1 | 0–3 | 1–3 | 1–1 |
| Inter de Luanda | 3–0 | 3–1 | 3–2 | 0–0 | 0–0 | 2–2 | — | 1–2 | 5–0 | 1–1 | 1–0 | 2–2 | 1–4 | 0–0 |
| Mambroa | 1–1 | 4–0 | 5–2 | 4–1 | 1–1 | 0–0 | 1–1 | — | 1–0 | 1–1 | 1–0 | 0–1 | 0–2 | 5–2 |
| Nacional de Benguela | 0–1 | 2–0 | 1–1 | 2–1 | 1–0 | 0–0 | – | 1–1 | — | 1–1 | 0–0 | 0–4 | 0–1 | 1–1 |
| Petro de Luanda | 0–2 | 3–0 | 2–1 | 1–2 | 2–2 | 0–1 | 0–0 | 2–1 | 0–1 | — | 3–1 | 1–1 | 3–2 | 1–1 |
| Petro do Huambo | – | 0–0 | 2–1 | 2–1 | 0–0 | 1–1 | 1–0 | 1–1 | 0–0 | 1–1 | — | 2–0 | 2–0 | 0–1 |
| Primeiro de Agosto | 7–2 | 2–1 | 4–0 | 3–2 | 1–2 | 1–0 | 2–0 | 1–2 | 2–1 | 2–2 | 0–0 | — | 1–2 | 1–1 |
| Primeiro de Maio | 6–0 | 3–1 | 2–0 | 1–2 | 2–0 | 2–0 | 1–0 | 0–1 | 2–1 | 1–0 | 3–1 | 2–3 | — | 0–3 |
| Progresso do Sambizanga | 2–1 | 1–0 | 3–1 | 0–1 | 4–1 | 1–0 | 2–1 | 3–2 | 2–0 | 1–2 | 0–0 | 0–4 | 1–1 | — |

Updated to match(es) played on 22 November 1983. Source: girabola.com
Legend: Blue = home team win; Yellow = draw; Red = away team win.

== Season statistics ==
=== Scorers ===
R/T
| R/T | ACA | AND | CML | DBG | DCH | DTA | INT | MAM | NAC | PET | PHU | PRI | PRM | PRO | TOTAL |
|---|---|---|---|---|---|---|---|---|---|---|---|---|---|---|---|
| 1 | 1/5/83 | 1/5/83 | 1/5/83 | 25/5/83 | 1/5/83 | 1/5/83 | 25/5/83 | 1/5/83 | 1/5/83 | 1/5/83 | 1/5/83 | 2/5/83 | 1/5/83 | 2/5/83 | |
| 1 | ACA–DCH – | MAM–AND 4–0 | CML–PET – | INT–DBG 0–0 | ACA–DCH – | DTA–PHU 2–1; Tozé 29' 56' | INT–DBG 0–0 | MAM–AND 4–0; Marques 18' 75'; Ralph 60'; Julião 62' | PRM–NAC 2–1; Luvambo 17' | CML–PET – | DTA–PHU 2–1; Didí 81' | PRI–PRO 1–1; Alves 37' | PRM–NAC 2–1; Maluka 25' 65' | PRI–PRO 1–1; Santinho 44' | |
| 2 | 8/5/83 | 8/5/83 | 8/5/83 | 1/6/83 | 8/5/83 | 9/5/83 | 8/5/83 | 8/5/83 | 8/5/83 | 9/5/83 | 8/5/83 | 8/5/83 | 1/6/83 | 8/5/83 | |
| 2 | ACA–PRO 0–1 | AND–INT 0–5 | DCH–CML – | DBG–PRM 1–2; Catumbela ' | DCH–CML – | PET–DTA 0–1; Tozé 87' | AND–INT 0–5 | PHU–MAM 1–1; Lourenço 15' o.g. | PRI–NAC 2–1; Luvambo 45'pen. | PET–DTA 0–1 | PHU–MAM 1–1; Lourenço 89' | PRI–NAC 2–1; Alves 46'; Nelo 80' | DBG–PRM 1–2; Zandú 15'; Maluka 82' | ACA–PRO 0–1Zé Luís 9' | |
| 3 | 14/5/83 | 15/5/83 | 15/5/83 | 15/5/83 | 14/5/83 | 14/5/83 | 15/5/83 | 15/5/83 | 14/5/83 | 15/5/83 | 15/5/83 | 15/5/83 | 15/5/83 | 15/5/83 | 19 |
| 3 | ACA–NAC 1–1; Tó 7' | AND–PHU 3–0 | CML–PRO 1–1; Pedrito 70' | DBG–PRI 1–1; Nelson 6' | DTA–DCH 2–1; Bernardino ' | DTA–DCH 2–1; César 7'; Luntadila 16' | INT–PRM 1–4; Mingo 21' | MAM–PET 1–1; Santana 3' | ACA–NAC 1–1; Armindo 24' | MAM–PET 1–1; Haia 52' | AND–PHU 3–0 | DBG–PRI 1–1; Vieira Dias I 31' | INT–PRM 1–4; Zandú 43' 64'; Daniel 89'; Maluka 90' | CML–PRO 1–1; Vata 30' | 19 |
| 4 | 22/5/83 | 31/5/83 | 22/5/83 | 22/5/83 | 22/5/83 | 22/5/83 | 22/5/83 | 22/5/83 | 22/5/83 | 31/5/83 | 22/5/83 | 31/7/83 | 31/7/83 | | 14 |
| 4 | ACA–DBG 0–0 | PET–AND 3–0 | NAC–CML 1–1; Russo 90' | ACA–DBG 0–0 | DCH–MAM 1–1; Malé 20' | PRO–DTA 1–0 | PHU–INT 1–0 | DCH–MAM 1–1; Figueiredo 35' | NAC–CML 1–1; Armindo 4' | PET–AND 3–0; Adrix 24' o.g. Lufemba 55'; Haia 83' | PHU–INT 1–0; Lourenço 47' | PRM–PRI 2–3; Vieira Dias I 31'; Loth 67'; Lourenço 90' | PRM–PRI 2–3; Maluka 36'; Lourenço o.g. | PRO–DTA 1–0; Deny 38' | 14 |
| 5 | 15/6/83 | 28/5/83 | 29/5/83 | 29/5/83 | 28/5/83 | 28/5/83 | 29/5/83 | 29/5/83 | 28/5/83 | 28/5/83 | 28/5/83 | 29/5/83 | 15/6/83 | 29/5/83 | 30 |
| 5 | PRM–ACA 6–0 | AND–DCH 0–2 | CML–DBG 4–3; Pinheiro 7'; Jamaica 10'; Pedrito 30'; Barata o.g. | CML–DBG 4–3; Enoque 43' 65' ? 83' o.g. | AND–DCH 0–2; Malé 14'; Bernardino 57' | NAC–DTA 0–0 | INT–PRI 2–2; Toy 12'; Raúl Kinanga 57' | MAM–PRO 5–2; Figueiredo 15' 48' 57' 87'; Ralph 44' | NAC–DTA 0–0 | PET–PHU 3–1; Lito 47'; Jesus 57'; Haia 80' | PET–PHU 3–1; Saavedra 65' | INT–PRI 2–2; Ndunguidi 40'; Alves 59' | PRM–ACA 6–0; Daniel x2 Fidèle ' Maluka ' Sarmento x2 | MAM–PRO 5–2; Matateu 78'; Vata 80' | 30 |
| 6 | 4/6/83 | 5/6/83 | 5/6/83 | 4/6/83 | 5/6/83 | 4/6/83 | 3/6/83 | 5/6/83 | 5/6/83 | 3/6/83 | 5/6/83 | 4/6/83 | 5/6/83 | 5/6/83 | 20 |
| 6 | PRI–ACA 7–2; Tony 73'; Tó 87' | PRO–AND 1–0 | PRM–CML 2–0 | DBG–DTA 2–2; Zezé 17'; Barros 19' | DCH–PHU – | DBG–DTA 2–2; Tozé 26'; Sabino 73' | INT–PET 1–1; Mendinho 43'pen. | MAM–NAC 1–0; Julião ' | MAM–NAC 1–0 | INT–PET 1–1; Jesus 60' | DCH–PHU – | PRI–ACA 7–2; Alves 12' 46' 50' 55'; Loth 70'; Lourenço 75'; Bandeira 80' o.g. | PRM–CML 2–0 | PRO–AND 1–0 | 20 |
| 7 | 12/6/83 | 11/6/83 | 13/6/83 | 13/6/83 | 10/6/83 | 11/6/83 | 12/6/83 | 13/6/83 | 11/6/83 | 10/6/83 | 13/6/83 | 13/6/83 | 11/6/83 | 13/6/83 | 20 |
| 7 | INT–ACA 3–0 | AND–NAC 1–1 | CML–PRI 1–3; Pedrito 21' | DBG–MAM 2–0 | PET–DCH 2–2; Tuca 29'; Bernardino 84' | DTA–PRM 1–3; Chico Dinis 22' | INT–ACA 3–0 | DBG–MAM 2–0 | AND–NAC 1–1 | PET–DCH 2–2; Laika 26'; Abel Campos 35' | PHU–PRO 0–1 | CML–PRI 1–3; Ndunguidi 11'; Loth 18' | DTA–PRM 1–3; Maluka 38' ? Fusso 49' | PHU–PRO 0–1; Deny 85' | 20 |
| 8 | 20/6/83 | 18/6/83 | 20/6/83 | 18/6/83 | 20/6/83 | 20/6/83 | 20/6/83 | 20/6/83 | 20/6/83 | 18/6/83 | 20/6/83 | 20/6/83 | 20/6/83 | 18/6/83 | 14 |
| 8 | ACA–CML 2–1 | DBG–AND 1–2 | ACA–CML 2–1 | DBG–AND 1–2 | DCH–INT 0–2 | PRI–DTA 1–0 | DCH–INT 0–2 | MAM–PRM 0–2 | NAC–PHU 0–0 | PRO–PET 1–2; Jesus 25'; Haia 47' | NAC–PHU 0–0 | PRI–DTA 1–0; Vieira Dias I 57' | MAM–PRM 0–2; Daniel 53'; Maluka ' | PRO–PET 1–2; Joãozinho 58' | 14 |
| 9 | 26/6/83 | 25/6/83 | 26/6/83 | 26/6/83 | 26/6/83 | 26/6/83 | 26/6/83 | 25/6/83 | 26/6/83 | 26/6/83 | 26/6/83 | 25/6/83 | 25/6/83 | 26/6/83 | 15 |
| 9 | ACA–DTA 0–1 | AND–PRM 1–3 | CML–INT 0–1 | PHU–DBG 2–1; Enoque 80' | DCH–PRO 2–0 | ACA–DTA 0–1 | CML–INT 0–1; Quinito 72' | PRI–MAM 1–2; Teixeira 25'; Julião 78' | PET–NAC 0–1 | PET–NAC 0–1 | PHU–DBG 2–1; Detoni 30'; Belchior 32' | PRI–MAM 1–2; Vieira Dias I 65' | AND–PRM 1–3 | DCH–PRO 2–0 | 15 |
| 10 | 3/7/83 | 2/7/83 | 3/7/83 | 2/7/83 | 3/7/83 | 3/7/83 | 3/7/83 | 3/7/83 | 3/7/83 | 2/7/83 | 3/7/83 | 2/7/83 | 3/7/83 | 3/7/83 | 13 |
| 10 | MAM–ACA 1–1; Paiata 13' | AND–PRI 1–4; Zacarias 27'pen. | CML–DTA 0–1 | DBG–PET 0–0 | DCH–NAC 1–0; Tuca 14' | CML–DTA 0–1; Luntadila 40' | INT–PRO 0–0 | MAM–ACA 1–1; Julião 65' | DCH–NAC 1–0 | DBG–PET 0–0 | PRM–PHU 3–1; Aníbal 53'pen. | AND–PRI 1–4; V. Dias I 4' 66' 83'; Alves 9' | PRM–PHU 3–1; Sarmento 8'; Almeida 41' o.g. Fusso 71'pen. | INT–PRO 0–0 | 13 |
| 11 | 9/7/83 | 9/7/83 | 9/7/83 | 9/7/83 | 9/7/83 | 8/7/83 | 8/7/83 | 9/7/83 | 30/7/83 | 13/7/83 | 13/7/83 | 13/7/83 | 13/7/83 | 30/7/83 | 14 |
| 11 | ACA–AND 1–0; Joaquim ' | ACA–AND 1–0 | MAM–CML 5–2; Jamaica ' Ricky ' | DCH–DBG 0–0 | DCH–DBG 0–0 | DTA–INT 2–1; Tozé x2 | DTA–INT 2–1; Mendinho ' | MAM–CML 5–2; Julião x2 Maria ' Santana ' Teixeira | NAC–PRO 1–1; Sayombo 68' | PRM–PET 1–0 | PRI–PHU 0–0 | PRI–PHU 0–0 | PRM–PET 1–0; Fusso pen. | NAC–PRO 1–1; Mitó 13' | 14 |
| 12 | | 7/8/83 | 7/8/83 | 6/8/83 | 6/8/83 | 7/8/83 | | 7/8/83 | | 5/8/83 | | 5/8/83 | 6/8/83 | 6/8/83 | |
| 12 | PHU–ACA – | CML–AND 2–1; Bavi 61' | CML–AND 2–1; Pedrito 15' 73' | PRO–DBG 0–1; Nando Jordão ' | PRM–DCH 2–0 | DTA–MAM 1–1; Chico Dinis pen. | NAC–INT – | DTA–MAM 1–1; Julião 40' | NAC–INT – | PRI–PET 2–2; Abel Campos ' Laika ' | PHU–ACA – | PRI–PET 2–2; Nelito Kwanza 13'; Vieira Dias I 68' | PRM–DCH 2–0; Fidèle 69'; Maluka 88' | PRO–DBG 0–1 | |
| 13 | 14/8/83 | 13/8/83 | 14/8/83 | | | 13/8/83 | 14/8/83 | 14/8/83 | 14/8/83 | 14/8/83 | 14/8/83 | 14/8/83 | 14/8/83 | 14/8/83 | 16 |
| 13 | ACA–PET 1–1 | AND–DTA 3–1 | CML–PHU 1–2 | DBG–NAC 0–0 | DCH–PRI 1–2; Bernardino 36' | AND–DTA 3–1 | MAM–INT 1–1; Mendinho 14' | MAM–INT 1–1; Ed.Machado 48' | DBG–NAC 0–0 | ACA–PET 1–1 | CML–PHU 1–2 | DCH–PRI 1–2; Vieira Dias I 72'; Ndunguidi 78'pen. | PRO–PRM 1–1; Fidèle 75' | PRO–PRM 1–1; Santinho 65' | 16 |
| 14 | 21/8/83 | 20/8/83 | 21/8/83 | 26/10/83 | 21/8/83 | 21/8/83 | 26/10/83 | 20/8/83 | 21/8/83 | 21/8/83 | 21/8/83 | 20/8/83 | 21/8/83 | 20/8/83 | 21 |
| 14 | DCH–ACA 2–1; Paiata 76' | AND–MAM 1–3; Zacarias ' | PET–CML 2–1; Guilherme 17' | DBG–INT 1–3 | DCH–ACA 2–1; Carlitos 4' 19' | PHU–DTA 1–1; Chico Dinis 24'pen. | DBG–INT 1–3 | AND–MAM 1–3; Jorge x2 Victor ' | NAC–PRM 0–1 | PET–CML 2–1; Haia 19'; Abel Campos 83' | PHU–DTA 1–1; Benjamim 8' | PRO–PRI – | NAC–PRM 0–1 | PRO–PRI – | 21 |
| 15 | 28/8/83 | 27/8/83 | 28/8/83 | 27/8/83 | 28/8/83 | 26/8/83 | 27/8/83 | 28/8/83 | 28/8/83 | 26/8/83 | 28/8/83 | 28/8/83 | 27/8/83 | 28/8/83 | 17 |
| 15 | PRO–ACA 2–1; Paiata 12' | INT–AND 3–1; Zé 59' | CML–DCH 1–0; Pinheiro 15' | PRM–DBG 1–2; Didí ' Zezé ' | CML–DCH 1–0 | DTA–PET 0–1 | INT–AND 3–1; Mendinho 32'; Raúl 50'; Mingo 54' | MAM–PHU 1–0; Julião 87' | NAC–PRI 0–4 | DTA–PET 0–1; Dico 57' | MAM–PHU 1–0 | NAC–PRI 0–4; Zeca 65'; Tandu 73'; Amândio 85'; Vieira Dias II 90' | PRM–DBG 1–2; Simões ' | PRO–ACA 2–1; Vata 42' 68' | 17 |
| 16 | 3/9/83 | 4/9/83 | 2/9/83 | 3/9/83 | 4/9/83 | 4/9/83 | 4/9/83 | 4/9/83 | 3/9/83 | 4/9/83 | 4/9/83 | 3/9/83 | 4/9/83 | 2/9/83 | 14 |
| 16 | NAC–ACA 0–1; Paiata 28' | PHU–AND 0–0 | PRO–CML 3–1; Pinheiro 19' | PRI–DBG 3–2; Zezé 15' 85' | DCH–DTA 0–0 | DCH–DTA 0–0 | PRM–INT 1–0 | PET–MAM 2–1; Teixeira 89' | NAC–ACA 0–1 | PET–MAM 2–1; Haia 26'; Lufemba 51' | PHU–AND 0–0 | PRI–DBG 3–2; Ndunguidi 22'pen. 70'pen. Nelito Kwanza 40' | PRM–INT 1–0; Sarmento 38' | PRO–CML 3–1; Joãozinho 41' 61'; Zé Luís 45' | 14 |
| 17 | 11/9/83 | 10/9/83 | 11/9/83 | 11/9/83 | 11/9/83 | 9/9/83 | 10/9/83 | 11/9/83 | 11/9/83 | 10/9/83 | 10/9/83 | 11/9/83 | 11/9/83 | 9/9/83 | 15 |
| 17 | DBG–ACA 0–0 | AND–PET 1–2; Hilário ' | CML–NAC 1–3 | DBG–ACA 0–0 | MAM–DCH 1–1; Quim Sebas 8' | DTA–PRO 1–1; Luntadila 10' | INT–PHU 1–0; Mingo 55' | MAM–DCH 1–1; Ed.Machado 16' | CML–NAC 1–3 | AND–PET 1–2; Jesus ' Haia 83' | INT–PHU 1–0 | PRI–PRM 1–2; Alves 41' | PRI–PRM 1–2; Maluka 39'; Zandú 68' | DTA–PRO 1–1; Zé Luís ' | 15 |
| 18 | 17/9/83 | 17/9/83 | 17/9/83 | 17/9/83 | 17/9/83 | 16/9/83 | 2/11/83 | 17/9/83 | 16/9/83 | 17/9/83 | 17/9/83 | 2/11/83 | 17/9/83 | 17/9/83 | 19 |
| 18 | ACA–PRM 0–1 | DCH–AND 3–0 | DBG–CML 2–2; Sampaio 47'; Pinheiro 55' | DBG–CML 2–2; Kaizer 33'; Enoque 43' | DCH–AND 3–0 | DTA–NAC 1–1; Luntadila 65' | PRI–INT 2–0 | PRO–MAM 3–2; Ed.Machado ' | DTA–NAC 1–1; Armindo 28' | PHU–PET 1–1; Dico ' | PHU–PET 1–1; Benjamim ' | PRI–INT 2–0; Alves ' Ndunguidi ' | ACA–PRM 0–1 | PRO–MAM 3–2; Joãozinho 6' ? | 19 |
| 19 | 21/9/83 | 21/9/83 | 21/9/83 | 25/9/83 | 25/9/83 | 25/9/83 | 21/9/83 | 25/9/83 | 25/9/83 | 21/9/83 | 25/9/83 | 21/9/83 | 21/9/83 | 21/9/83 | 20 |
| 19 | ACA–PRI 2–0 | AND–PRO 3–2; Beto x2 Frederico ' | CML–PRM 2–3; Buiú ' Jamaica ' | DTA–DBG 3–3; Nelson 9'; Enoque 73'; Zezé 80' | PHU–DCH 0–0 | DTA–DBG 3–3; Ch.Dinis 15' 42'; Catarino 45' | PET–INT 0–0 | NAC–MAM 1–1; Marques 18' | NAC–MAM 1–1; Sayombo 76' | PET–INT 0–0 | PHU–DCH 0–0 | ACA–PRI 2–0 | CML–PRM 2–3; Fidèle ' Sarmento ' Zé Águas | AND–PRO 3–2; Santinho ' Zezinho ' | 20 |
| 20 | 1/10/83 | 2/10/83 | 19/10/83 | 2/10/83 | 19/10/83 | 19/10/83 | 1/10/83 | 2/10/83 | 2/10/83 | 19/10/83 | 18/10/83 | 19/10/83 | 19/10/83 | 18/10/83 | 17 |
| 20 | ACA–INT 0–3 | NAC–AND 2–0 | PRI–CML 4–0 | MAM–DBG 4–1; Didí 79' | DCH–PET 1–0 | PRM–DTA 2–0 | ACA–INT 0–3; Armando ' Mendinho x2 | MAM–DBG 4–1; Julião 5'; Marques 28' 64'; Santana 34' | NAC–AND 2–0 | DCH–PET 1–0 | PRO–PHU 0–0 | PRI–CML 4–0; Alves x2 V.Dias I x2 | PRM–DTA 2–0; Maluka x2 | PRO–PHU 0–0 | 17 |
| 21 | 9/10/83 | 8/10/83 | 9/10/83 | 8/10/83 | 9/11/83 | 8/11/83 | 9/11/83 | 8/11/83 | 9/10/83 | 8/10/83 | 9/10/83 | 8/11/83 | 8/11/83 | 8/10/83 | 11 |
| 21 | CML–ACA 2–1 | AND–DBG 1–1; J.Adriano 87'pen. | CML–ACA 2–1 | AND–DBG 1–1; Didí 75' | INT–DCH 0–0 | DTA–PRI 0–3 | INT–DCH 0–0 | PRM–MAM 0–1; Marques 56' | PHU–NAC 0–0 | PET–PRO 1–1; Lufemba 34' | PHU–NAC 0–0 | DTA–PRI 0–3; Nelito Kwanza 65'; Alves 67'; Loth 74' | PRM–MAM 0–1 | PET–PRO 1–1 | 11 |
| 22 | 16/10/83 | 16/10/83 | 15/10/83 | 14/10/83 | 15/10/83 | 16/10/83 | 15/10/83 | 16/10/83 | 15/10/83 | 15/10/83 | 14/10/83 | 16/10/83 | 16/10/83 | 15/10/83 | 20 |
| 22 | DTA–ACA 0–0 | PRM–AND 3–1; Nelito 40' | INT–CML 3–2; Buiú ' Pinheiro ' | DBG–PHU 3–0; Barros 17'; Zezé 35'; Nelson 64' | PRO–DCH 4–1; Bernardino 14' | DTA–ACA 0–0 | INT–CML 3–2; Eurípedes ' Mingo ' Pancho 'o.g. | MAM–PRI 0–1 | NAC–PET 1–1; Luvambo ' | NAC–PET 1–1; Jesus ' | DBG–PHU 3–0 | MAM–PRI 0–1; Amândio 14' | PRM–AND 3–1; Fusso 30'; Maluka 54'; Sarmento 67' | PRO–DCH 4–1; Vata 13' 22'; Arsénio 32' o.g. Santinho 70' | 20 |
| 23 | 22/10/83 | 23/10/83 | 22/10/83 | 22/10/83 | 23/10/83 | 22/10/83 | 21/10/83 | 22/10/83 | 23/10/83 | 22/10/83 | 23/10/83 | 23/10/83 | 23/10/83 | 21/10/83 | 15 |
| 23 | ACA–MAM 3–0; WALKOVER | PRI–AND 2–1 | DTA–CML 1–0 | PET–DBG 1–2; Didí ' Nelson ' | NAC–DCH 1–0 | DTA–CML 1–0; Chiquito ' | PRO–INT 2–1; Mingo ' | ACA–MAM 3–0; WALKOVER | NAC–DCH 1–0; Cabinda 26' | PET–DBG 1–2; Jesus ' | PHU–PRM 2–0; Simões 7' o.g. Almeida 52' | PRI–AND 2–1 | PHU–PRM 2–0 | PRO–INT 2–1; Vata x2 | 15 |
| 24 | 29/10/83 | 29/10/83 | 30/10/83 | 29/10/83 | 29/10/83 | 29/10/83 | 29/10/83 | 30/10/83 | 29/10/83 | 30/10/83 | 30/10/83 | 30/10/83 | 30/10/83 | 29/10/83 | 23 |
| 24 | AND–ACA 3–1; Chico ' | AND–ACA 3–1; Patrocínio x2 Zé ' | CML–MAM 2–3 | DBG–DCH 1–0; Nelson 46' | DBG–DCH 1–0 | INT–DTA 2–2; Luntadila 27'; Catarino 55' | INT–DTA 2–2; Mendinho 28'; Quinito 44' | CML–MAM 2–3 | PRO–NAC 2–0 | PET–PRM 3–2; Abel Campos ' Haia 62'; Lufemba 73' | PHU–PRI 2–0; Mateus 18'; Rui Sousa 72' | PHU–PRI 2–0 | PET–PRM 3–2; Maluka 26'; Fusso 'pen. | PRO–NAC 2–0; Vata 35' 88' | 23 |
| 25 | 6/11/83 | 5/11/83 | 5/11/83 | 6/11/83 | 5/11/83 | 5/11/83 | 6/11/83 | 5/11/83 | 6/11/83 | 5/11/83 | 6/11/83 | 5/11/83 | 5/11/83 | 6/11/83 | 15 |
| 25 | ACA–PHU 1–1 | AND–CML 0–0 | AND–CML 0–0 | DBG–PRO 1–0; Didí ' | DCH–PRM 2–3; Docas II 15'; Sarmento 89' o.g. | MAM–DTA 0–0 | INT–NAC 5–0; Feliciano 20'; Mingo 25' 71'; Quinito 41'; Kansas ' | MAM–DTA 0–0 | INT–NAC 5–0 | PET–PRI 1–1; Lufemba 29' | ACA–PHU 1–1 | PET–PRI 1–1; Vieira Dias I 80' | DCH–PRM 2–3; Fidèle 10'; Maluka 50'; Sarmento 53' | DBG–PRO 1–0 | 15 |
| 26 | 18/11/83 | 19/11/83 | 20/11/83 | 20/11/83 | 20/11/83 | 19/11/83 | 19/11/83 | 19/11/83 | 20/11/83 | 18/11/83 | 20/11/83 | 20/11/83 | 20/11/83 | 20/11/83 | 20 |
| 26 | PET–ACA 0–2 | DTA–AND 2–1; J.Adriano 7'pen. | PHU–CML 2–1; Neto 75' | NAC–DBG 2–1; Isaac 49' | PRI–DCH 1–2 | DTA–AND 2–1; Luntadila 35'; Afonsinho 48' | INT–MAM 1–2; Mendinho ' | INT–MAM 1–2; Nené ' Marques ' | NAC–DBG 2–1; Louro 14' | PET–ACA 0–2 | PHU–CML 2–1; Mateus 5'; Benjamim 68' | PRI–DCH 1–2 | PRM–PRO 0–3 | PRM–PRO 0–3; Sorcier 3'; Vata 43' 57' | 20 |
| T | 20 | 25 | | 32 | | 25 | | 42 | | | | 55 | 52 | 34 | |

=== Top scorers ===
As of 22 November 1983

| Rank | Scorer | Club | Goals |
|---|---|---|---|
| 1 | (Angola) Joseph Maluka | 1º de Maio | 17 |
| 2 | (Angola) Vata | Progresso | 14 |
| 3 | (Angola) Vieira Dias I | 1º de Agosto | 13 |
| 4 | (Angola) Mendinho | Inter de Luanda | 12 |
| 4 | (Angola) Alves | 1º de Agosto | 12 |
| 6 | (Angola) Ndunguidi | 1º de Agosto | 10 |
| 7 | (Angola) Julião | Mambroa | 9 |
| 7 | (Angola) Bavi | Andorinhas | 9 |
| 7 | (Angola) Jesus | Petro de Luanda | 9 |

=== Most goals scored in a single match ===
| Player | For | Against | Result | Round | Date |
4 goals (Poker)
| (Angola) Figueiredo | Mambroa | Progresso | 5-2 | 5 | 29 May 1983 |
| (Angola) Alves | 1º de Agosto | Académica Lobito | 7-2 | 6 | 4 June 1983 |
3 Goals (Hat-trick)
| (Angola) Vieira Dias I | 1º de Agosto | Andorinhas | 1-4 | 10 | 2 July 1983 |

== Champions ==
1983 Girabola winner

1st title

The Champions:
João de Deus, Kiala, Tomás (GK)
Agostinho, André, Kelson, Melanchton, Santana, Simões (DF)
Fidèle, Fusso, Lázaro, Sarmento, Zé Águas (MF)
Agostinho Reis, Daniel, Maluka, Zandú (FW)
Petar Knežević (Head Coach)

Top Scorer
