= 2000 Girabola =

Girabola 2000
- Season: 2000 (Mar 18–Nov 05)
- Champions: Petro de Luanda
- Relegated: ARA da Gabela; Sporting Cabinda; Sporting do Bié
- 2001 CAF Champions League: Petro de Luanda (Girabola winner)
- 2001 CAF Cup: ASA (Girabola runner-up)
- Matches played: 182
- Goals scored: 444 (2.44 per match)
- Top goalscorer: Blanchard (19 goals)
- Biggest home win: Petro 6–1 ARA (30 Apr 2000); Petro 6–1 Acad (29 May 2000)
- Biggest away win: Benf 0–6 Petro (06 May 2000)
- Highest scoring: 3 matches: Petro 6–1 ARA (30 Apr 2000); Petro 6–1 Acad (29 May 2000); ASA 5–2 Acad (01 May 2000)

The 2000 Girabola was the 22nd season of top-tier football competition in Angola. The season ran from 18 March to 5 November 2000. Primeiro de Agosto were the defending champions.

The league comprised 14 teams, the bottom three of which were relegated to the 2001 Gira Angola.

Petro de Luanda were crowned champions, winning their 12th title, while ARA da Gabela, Sporting de Cabinda and Sporting do Bié, were relegated.

Blanchard of Benfica de Luanda finished as the top scorer with 19 goals.

== Changes from the 1999 season ==
Relegated: Independente do Tômbwa and Progresso do Sambizanga
Withdrew: Cambondo de Malanje
Promoted: ARA da Gabela and Sporting do Bié

- Note: From this season on and up until 2009, the Girabola was contested by 14 teams, instead of 16.
Locations of the 2000 Girabola teams

== League table ==
Pos	Team	Pld	W	D	L	GF	GA	GD	Pts	Qualification or relegation
1	Petro de Luanda (C)	26	20	3	3	65	16	+49	63	Qualification for Champions League
2	ASA	26	13	5	8	47	29	+18	44	Qualification for CAF Cup
3	Petro do Huambo	26	12	6	8	28	23	+5	42	
4	Primeiro de Agosto	26	11	7	8	33	19	+14	40	
5	Interclube	26	12	4	10	30	27	+3	40	
6	Sonangol do Namibe (Note: Name later changed to Atlético do Namibe)	26	11	6	9	32	30	+2	39	
7	Académica do Lobito	26	10	6	10	28	35	−7	36	
8	Benfica de Luanda	26	11	2	13	36	45	−9	35	
9	Sagrada Esperança	25	9	6	10	21	30	−9	33	
10	Onze Bravos (Note: Name later changed to Bravos do Maquis)	26	8	9	9	29	34	−5	33	
11	FC de Cabinda	26	8	8	10	24	31	−7	32	
12	Sporting de Cabinda (R)	26	8	7	11	28	29	−1	31	Relegation to Provincial stages
13	ARA da Gabela (R)	26	6	2	18	23	46	−23	20	Relegation to Provincial stages
14	Sporting do Bié (R)	25	5	3	17	20	50	−30	18	Relegation to Provincial stages

Updated to match(es) played on 5 November 2000. Source: Girabola.com
Rules for classification: 1) Points; 2) Head-to-head points; 3) Head-to-head goal difference; 4) Goal difference; 5) Goals scored; 6) Fair-play points; 7) Play-off.
(C) Champions; (R) Relegated

== Results ==
Home \ Away	11B	ACL	ARA	ASA	BEN	FCC	INT	PET	PHU	PRI	SAG	SBI	SCC	SON
11 Bravos	—	1–1	2–1	2–2	2–0	2–1	1–1	1–0	0–0	0–1	1–0	3–2	1–0	3–1
Académica do Lobito	1–0	—	3–2	1–0	1–0	2–0	0–0	1–0	0–0	0–0	2–0	4–0	1–0	1–1
ARA da Gabela	1–0	2–1	—	0–2	2–2	4–0	0–3	2–2	0–1	1–0	0–1	2–0	0–1	0–1
ASA	4–2	2–0	4–1	—	3–1	1–0	5–2	1–2	1–1	2–1	1–0	3–2	2–2	2–0
Benfica de Luanda	2–1	5–1	1–0	2–1	—	2–1	2–0	0–6	3–2	0–1	1–2	4–1	1–0	4–2
FC de Cabinda	3–0	2–1	2–3	1–0	1–2	—	1–0	0–3	1–0	1–0	1–0	3–2	1–1	0–0
Interclube	2–1	3–1	0–0	1–3	1–0	2–1	—	0–3	1–0	0–1	1–0	3–1	1–0	0–2
Petro de Luanda	2–1	6–1	6–1	2–1	3–0	1–1	1–0	—	2–1	1–0	4–1	5–0	2–1	3–0
Petro do Huambo	1–1	2–0	3–0	1–0	2–1	2–0	1–1	0–2	—	1–0	1–0	2–1	1–0	3–1
Primeiro de Agosto	1–1	2–1	3–0	1–0	5–0	1–1	0–2	0–0	0–2	—	5–1	4–0	1–1	4–1
Sagrada Esperança	1–1	2–2	2–1	1–0	1–0	0–0	0–3	2–1	3–0	0–0	—	1–1	1–0	1–0
Sporting do Bié	0–0	1–0	1–0	1–5	3–1	1–0	1–3	0–3	0–0	0–1	–	—	2–0	0–1
Sporting de Cabinda	5–1	4–1	2–1	0–0	2–1	1–1	1–0	0–3	3–0	1–1	1–1	1–0	—	1–3
Sonangol do Namibe	1–1	0–1	3–0	2–2	1–1	0–0	1–0	1–2	2–1	2–0	3–0	1–0	2–0	—

Updated to match(es) played on 5 November 2000. Source: girabola.com
Legend: Blue = home team win; Yellow = draw; Red = away team win.

== Season statistics ==
=== Top scorer ===
- (Democratic Republic of the Congo) Blanchard

== Champions ==
2000 Girabola winner
Atlético Petróleos de Luanda
12th title

Squad: Avelino Lopes, Betinho, Cacharamba, Chinho, Dias Caires, Filipe, Flávio, Gilberto, Guedes, Gui, Mbiyavanga, Nando, Nsuka, Renato, William, Zico
Head coach: Djalma Cavalcante
