= 2009 Girabola =

Girabola
- Season: 2009 (Feb 19–Oct 25)
- Champions: Petro de Luanda
- Relegated: Académica do Lobito; Primeiro de Maio; Kabuscorp
- CAF Champions League: Petro de Luanda (winner); Rec do Libolo (runner-up)
- Matches: 182
- Goals: 455 (2.5 per match)
- Top goalscorer: David Magalhães (19 goals)
- Biggest home win: Kabusc 6–0 Aca Lob (15 Mar 2009)
- Biggest away win: Pri Mai 0–5 Int Lua (8 Apr 2009)
- Highest scoring: Kabusc 6–0 Aca Lob (15 Mar 2009)

The 2009 Girabola was the 31st season of top-tier football in Angola. The season ran from 21 February to 25 October 2009. Petro Atlético were the defending champions.

The league comprised 14 teams and the bottom three were relegated to the 2010 Gira Angola.

Petro Atlético de Luanda were crowned champions, while Académica do Lobito, Primeiro de Maio and Kabuscorp were relegated. David Magalhães of Petro Luanda finished as top scorer with 19 goals.

== Changes from 2008 season ==
Relegated: Benfica do Lubango, Petro do Huambo, Sagrada Esperança
Promoted: Académica do Lobito, Académica do Soyo, Recreativo da Caála

Locations of the 2009 Girabola teams

== League table ==
Pos	Team	Pld	W	D	L	GF	GA	GD	Pts	Qualification or relegation
1	Petro de Luanda (C)	26	17	5	4	44	21	+23	56	Qualification for Champions League
2	Recreativo do Libolo	26	14	6	6	48	29	+19	48	Qualification for Champions League
3	Benfica de Luanda	26	14	5	7	42	32	+10	47	
4	Primeiro de Agosto	26	13	6	7	47	30	+17	45	
5	Académica do Soyo	26	12	3	11	33	36	−3	39	
6	Santos FC	26	9	9	8	29	29	0	36	
7	ASA	26	9	8	9	34	28	+6	35	
8	Interclube	26	8	9	9	33	26	+7	33	
9	Recreativo da Caála	26	9	6	11	28	30	−2	33	
10	Bravos do Maquis	26	8	8	10	24	33	−9	32	
11	Desportivo da Huíla	26	9	4	13	22	30	−8	31	
12	Kabuscorp (Q)	26	7	8	11	37	39	−2	29	Qualification for the Girabola play-offs
13	Primeiro de Maio (R)	26	6	5	15	20	39	−19	23	Relegation to Provincial stages
14	Académica do Lobito (R)	26	5	2	19	14	53	−39	17	Relegation to Provincial stages

Updated to match(es) played on 25 October 2009. Source: Girabola.com
Rules for classification: 1) Points; 2) Head-to-head points; 3) Head-to-head goal difference; 4) Goal difference; 5) Goals scored; 6) Fair-play points; 7) Play-off.
(C) Champions; (Q) Qualified to the phase indicated; (R) Relegated

== Results ==
Home \ Away	ACL	ACS	ASA	BEN	BRA	DES	INT	KAB	PET	PRI	MAI	CAA	LIB	SAN
Académica do Lobito	—	1–2	0–1	0–3	2–1	1–0	1–2	2–2	2–3	1–0	1–0	1–0	1–5	0–0
Académica do Soyo	2–0	—	1–2	1–2	1–0	1–0	1–0	1–0	2–2	0–3	1–2	2–1	2–3	0–0
ASA	1–0	3–2	—	3–1	1–1	1–1	0–0	1–1	0–1	1–1	1–2	0–0	2–2	5–1
Benfica de Luanda	2–0	1–2	1–0	—	3–1	3–1	3–2	2–0	1–3	1–5	3–0	1–0	1–1	2–1
Bravos do Maquis	1–0	0–0	2–1	1–0	—	1–0	2–2	1–0	1–1	1–1	2–1	2–1	1–4	1–1
Desportivo da Huíla	2–0	0–1	2–1	1–0	2–1	—	1–1	2–1	0–2	0–0	1–1	1–0	3–0	1–0
Interclube	2–0	2–0	1–2	1–1	1–0	2–1	—	0–0	0–1	2–3	0–0	4–1	1–1	1–1
Kabuscorp	6–0	2–0	0–3	3–3	1–1	3–2	2–1	—	2–2	4–2	2–3	1–1	0–1	1–3
Petro de Luanda	5–1	3–1	2–1	1–2	2–0	1–0	2–1	0–1	—	2–1	1–0	0–0	0–1	4–0
Primeiro de Agosto	3–0	1–2	1–0	2–3	1–0	3–0	2–1	3–1	0–1	—	1–0	3–1	1–1	1–2
Primeiro de Maio	1–0	3–0	2–1	1–1	1–2	0–1	0–5	0–1	0–2	2–3	—	0–1	0–3	1–1
Recreativo da Caála	5–0	2–1	2–1	1–0	0–0	1–0	0–1	2–1	3–1	2–2	0–0	—	0–2	1–0
Recreativo do Libolo	3–0	2–4	1–1	1–2	4–0	2–0	0–0	2–1	1–2	0–2	3–0	3–2	—	1–0
Santos FC	1–0	1–3	0–1	0–0	2–1	3–0	1–0	1–1	0–0	2–2	2–0	3–1	3–1	—

Updated to match(es) played on 6 November 2009. Source: girabola.com
Legend: Blue = home team win; Yellow = draw; Red = away team win.

== Season statistics ==
=== Top scorers ===
Rank	Scorer	Club	Goals
1	(Angola) David	Petro de Luanda	19
2	(Angola) Love	Primeiro de Agosto	16

=== Pokers & Hat-tricks ===
Poker
Nat	Player	For	Against	Result	Rnd	Date	Ref
(Brazil)	Reginaldo	Rec do Libolo	Bravos do Maquis	4-0	2	February 28, 2009	
Hat-tricks
Nat	Player	For	Against	Result	Rnd	Date	Ref
(Angola)	Dudú Leite	Recreativo da Caála	Académica do Lobito	5-0	2	March 1, 2009	
(Angola)	Manucho Barros	Santos FC	Rec da Caála	3-1	5	March 23, 2009	
(Angola)	David	Petro de Luanda	Académica do Soyo	3-1	6	April 8, 2009	
(Angola)	David	Petro de Luanda	Académica do Lobito	5-1	14	June 21, 2009	

2009 Girabola winner

15th title

Squad: Carlão, Cassoma, Chara, Dany, David, Day Day, Etah, Humberto, Jamuana, Job, Joka, Kivota, Lamá, Locó, Mabiná, Malamba, Mano, Massinga, Maurito, Miguel, Moussa, Nelo II, Papy, Renato, Santana, Sérgio, Stanick, Tunga, Wanga, Yamba Asha
Head coach: Bernardino Pedroto
