= F.C. Moxico =

Angolan football club

FC Moxico
- Full name: Futebol Clube do Moxico
- Ground: Estádio do Luena, Angola
- Capacity: 1500

Independente Sport Clube is an Angolan football club based in Luena, in Moxico Province.

In 1973 the team has won the Angolan Provincial Championship.

== Honours ==
- Girabola: 1973
