= 1995 Girabola =

Girabola 1995
- Season: 1995 (–)
- Champions: Petro Luanda
- Relegated: FC Cabinda; Sonangol; Sp Luanda; Sp Lubango
- 1996 African Cup of Champions Clubs: Petro Luanda (Girabola winner)
- 1996 CAF Cup: 1º de Agosto (Girabola 3rd place)
- Matches: 210
- Top goalscorer: Serginho (19 goals)

The 1995 Girabola was the 17th season of top-tier football competition in Angola. Atlético Petróleos de Luanda were the defending champions.

The league comprised 14 teams, the bottom four of which were relegated.

Petro de Luanda were crowned champions, winning their 10th title, and third in a row, while FC de Cabinda, Sonangol do Namibe, Sporting de Luanda and Sporting do Lubango were relegated.

Serginho of Desportivo da EKA finished as the top scorer with 19 goals.

== Changes from the 1994 season ==
Relegated: Inter da Huíla, Sagrada Esperança
Promoted: Académica do Lobito, FC de Cabinda, Petro do Huambo, Sporting do Lubango

Locations of the 1995 Girabola teams

== League table ==
Pos	Team	Pld	W	D	L	GF	GA	GD	Pts	Qualification or relegation
1	Petro de Luanda (C)	26	15	7	4	45	21	+24	52	Qualification for Champions Cup
2	ASA	26	14	8	4	43	16	+27	50	
3	Primeiro de Agosto	26	13	6	7	39	22	+17	45	Qualification for CAF Cup (Note: ASA who were entitled to participate in such competition as the runner-up, was the winner of the Angola Cup in that same year and therefore competed in the 1996 African Cup Winners' Cup.)
4	Primeiro de Maio	26	11	7	8	32	26	+6	40	
5	Progresso do Sambizanga	26	10	9	7	24	25	−1	39	
6	Desportivo da EKA	26	10	6	10	30	32	−2	36	
7	Petro do Huambo	26	10	6	10	23	28	−5	36	
8	Académica do Lobito	26	8	8	10	20	29	−9	32	
9	Independente do Tômbwa	26	9	4	13	25	24	+1	31	
10	Nacional de Benguela	26	9	4	13	27	41	−14	31	
11	Sonangol do Namibe (Note: Name later changed to Atlético do Namibe) (R)	26	8	6	12	28	33	−5	30	Relegation to Provincial stages
12	Sporting de Luanda (R)	26	7	7	12	21	31	−10	28	Relegation to Provincial stages
13	Sporting do Lubango (R)	26	7	6	13	29	39	−10	27	Relegation to Provincial stages
14	FC de Cabinda (R)	26	6	6	14	27	47	−20	24	Relegation to Provincial stages

Updated to match(es) played on 22 November 1995. Source: Girabola.com
Rules for classification: 1) Points; 2) Head-to-head points; 3) Head-to-head goal difference; 4) Goal difference; 5) Goals scored; 6) Fair-play points; 7) Play-off.
(C) Champions; (R) Relegated

== Results ==
Home \ Away	ACL	ASA	EKA	FCC	IND	NAC	PET	PHU	PRI	MAI	PRO	SON	SPO	SLB
Académica do Lobito	—													
ASA		—												
Desportivo da EKA			—											
FC de Cabinda				—										
Independente do Tômbwa					—									
Nacional de Benguela						—								
Petro de Luanda							—							
Petro do Huambo								—						
Primeiro de Agosto									—					
Primeiro de Maio										—				
Progresso do Sambizanga											—			
Rangol												—		
Sporting de Luanda													—	
Sporting do Lubango														—

Updated to match(es) played on 22 November 1995. Source: girabola.com
Legend: Blue = home team win; Yellow = draw; Red = away team win.

== Season statistics ==
=== Top scorer ===
- (Angola) Francisco Leite Jorge Serginho

== Champions ==
1995 Girabola winner

10th title

Squad: Amaral, Aurélio, Bodunha, Chico Dinis, Clarindo, Felito, Hélder, Kabongó, Libengué, Luís Bento, Marito, Nelo Bumba, Oliveira, Paulito, Paulo, Paulo Silva, Serginho, Willy, Zacarias, Zico
Head coach: Osvaldo Saturnino Jesus
