= Clube Ferroviário de Luanda =

Angolan sports club

- Ground: Estádio dos Coqueiros; Luanda, Angola
- Capacity: 12,000

Clube Ferroviário de Luanda is an Angolan multisports club based in Luanda. The club owns its name to its major sponsor, the Luanda Railway Company.

In 1953 the team has won the Campeonato Estadual da I Divisão (Angola's top division before independence).

== Stadium ==
Currently the team plays at the 12000 capacity Estádio dos Coqueiros.

== Honours ==
- Girabola: 1953, 1957, 1962

== See also ==
- Ferroviário de Luanda Handball
- Ferroviário de Luanda Basketball
- Girabola
  - 2014 Girabola
