= 1985 Girabola =

Girabola 1985
- Season: 1985 (–)
- Champions: 1º de Maio
- Relegated: Dínamos; Gaiatos; Leões
- 1986 African Cup of Champions Clubs: 1º de Maio (Girabola winner)
- Matches: 182
- Top goalscorer: Jesus (19 goals)

The 1985 Girabola was the seventh season of top-tier football competition in Angola. Estrela Clube Primeiro de Maio were the defending champions.

The league comprised 14 teams, the bottom three of which were relegated.

Primeiro de Maio were crowned champions, winning their 2nd title, while Gaiatos de Benguela, Dínamos do Kwanza Sul and Leões do Planalto were relegated.

Osvaldo Saturnino a.k.a. Jesus of Petro de Luanda finished as the top scorer with 19 goals.

== Changes from the 1984 season ==
Relegated: Construtores do Uíge, Nacional de Benguela, Progresso do Sambizanga
Promoted: Dínamos do Cuanza Sul (ex-Andorinhas), Gaiatos de Benguela, Leões do Planalto

Locations of the 1985 Girabola teams

== League table ==
Pos	Team	Pld	W	D	L	GF	GA	GD	Pts	Qualification or relegation
1	Primeiro de Maio (C)	26	15	6	5	34	20	+14	36	Qualification for Champions Cup
2	Desportivo da Chela (Note: Name later reverted to its original Benfica do Lubango)	26	15	4	7	40	24	+16	34	
3	Petro de Luanda	26	13	5	8	33	18	+15	31	
4	Inter de Luanda (Note: Name later changed to Interclube)	25	12	7	6	48	35	+13	31	
5	Sagrada Esperança	26	13	4	9	37	31	+6	30	
6	Ferroviário da Huíla	26	12	4	10	44	42	+2	28	
7	Desportivo de Benguela (Note: Name later reverted to its original Sporting de Benguela)	25	9	9	7	28	31	−3	27	
8	Mambroa (Note: Name later reverted to its original Benfica do Huambo)	26	9	8	9	21	24	−3	26	
9	Petro do Huambo	26	9	6	11	38	29	+9	24	
10	Primeiro de Agosto	25	8	6	11	32	32	0	22	
11	Desportivo da TAAG (Note: Name later reverted to its original ASA)	26	7	6	13	29	33	−4	20	
12	Gaiatos de Benguela (R)	25	6	7	12	18	31	−13	19	Relegation to Provincial stages
13	Dínamos do Cuanza Sul (R)	26	7	3	16	20	46	−26	17	Relegation to Provincial stages
14	Leões do Planalto (R)	26	2	11	13	26	52	−26	15	Relegation to Provincial stages

Updated to match(es) played on 22 November 1985. Source: Girabola.com
Rules for classification: 1) Points; 2) Head-to-head points; 3) Head-to-head goal difference; 4) Goal difference; 5) Goals scored; 6) Fair-play points; 7) Play-off.
(C) Champions; (R) Relegated

== Results ==
Home \ Away	DBG	DCH	DCS	DTA	FHL	GAI	INT	LPL	MAM	PET	PHU	PRI	PRM	SAG
Desportivo de Benguela	—	3–1	1–1	1–0	3–0 (Note: Desportivo de Benguela was awarded a 3–0 win)	1–0		0–0	0–0	0–1	1–0	1–0	2–2	0–3
Desportivo da Chela	1–1	—	3–0	4–0	1–0	3–0	2–2	0–1	3–1	1–0	3–0	1–2	0–1	2–2
Dínamos do C.S.	2–1	0–2	—	1–0	0–4	0–1	0–2	1–0	2–0	0–2	3–0	1–1		1–0
Desportivo da TAAG	1–2	0–1	2–1	—	10–1	1–1	1–3	1–1	1–0	1–0	2–0	1–2	0–2	1–2
Ferroviário da Huíla	4–0	2–0	3–0	3–1	—	3–2	0–2	3–1	1–0	2–2	1–0	3–1	0–1	3–1
Gaiatos de Benguela	0–0	0–2	0–0	3–0	2–1	—	0–3	1–0	0–1	0–2	2–1	1–1	0–0	0–0
Inter de Luanda	1–2	0–1	3–0	3–3	4–4	4–2	—	2–0	1–0	1–1	0–0	3–1	2–2	1–3
Leões do Planalto	2–2	1–1	2–2	3–0	1–3	1–1	2–5	—	1–1	1–1	1–1	1–1	1–2	0–2
Mambroa	0–0	1–2	1–0	4–1	0–0	1–0	1–1	3–2	—	1–2	1–0	1–0	0–0	1–1
Petro de Luanda	4–1	1–2	1–0	0–1	1–1	2–0	0–1	5–0	0–1	—	1–2	0–0	1–0	1–0
Petro do Huambo	4–2	3–0	0–0	3–1	3–0	2–0	5–0	7–1	0–0	0–2	—	1–1	1–2	3–1
Primeiro de Agosto	1–1	1–2	0–1	2–1	1–0	0–0	3–4	4–1	0–1	0–1	2–1	—	1–2	4–0
Primeiro de Maio	1–2	2–1	2–0	2–0	3–2	1–0	1–0	2–1	3–0	1–0	0–0	1–2	—	0–1
Sagrada Esperança	2–1	0–1	0–3	3–0	2–0	1–2	1–0	1–1	3–1	1–2	2–1	2–1	3–1	—

Updated to match(es) played on 22 November 1985. Source: girabola.com
Legend: Blue = home team win; Yellow = draw; Red = away team win.

== Season statistics ==
=== Scorers ===
R/T
R/T	DBG	DCH	DCS	DTA	FHL	GAI	INT	LPL	MAM	PET	PHU	PRI	PRM	SAG	TOTAL
1	10/3/85	9/3/85	15/5/85	9/3/85	10/3/85	10/3/85	10/3/85	10/3/85	10/3/85	15/5/85	10/3/85	9/3/85	9/3/85	10/3/85	17
1	DBG–SAG 0–3	PRI–DCH 1–2; Adriano ' Basílio 45'	DCS–PET 0–2	DTA–PRM 0–2	FHL–LPL 3–1	PHU–GAI 2–0	INT–MAM 1–0	FHL–LPL 3–1	INT–MAM 1–0	DCS–PET 0–2; Abel Campos ' Bavi '	PHU–GAI 2–0; Picas ' Martins ' o.g.	PRI–DCH 1–2; Ndunguidi 65'	DTA–PRM 0–2; Miúdo 38'; Fusso '	DBG–SAG 0–3	17
2	16/3/85	17/3/85	16/3/85	17/3/85	17/3/85	15/5/85	17/3/85	17/3/85	17/3/85	17/3/85	17/3/85	15/5/85	17/3/85	17/3/85	17
2	DCS–DBG 2–1	PET–DCH 1–2; Arsénio ' Basílio '	DCS–DBG 2–1	SAG–DTA 0–3; Coreano 2'; Dindinho 40'; Man'Adão 83'	FHL–INT 0–2	GAI–PRI 1–1; Louro '	FHL–INT 0–2	PRM–LPL 2–1	MAM–PHU 1–0; Maria 32'	PET–DCH 1–2; Jesus '	MAM–PHU 1–0	GAI–PRI 1–1; Ivo '	PRM–LPL 2–1	SAG–DTA 0–3	17
3	15/6/85	15/6/85	24/3/85	24/3/85	24/3/85	8/5/85	15/5/85	24/3/85	8/5/85	8/5/85	24/3/85	8/5/85	15/5/85	24/3/85	19
3	DCH–DBG 1–1	DCH–DBG 1–1	SAG–DCS 3–0	LPL–DTA 2–2	PHU–FHL 3–0	GAI–PET 0–2	INT–PRM 2–2; Raúl ' Túbia '	LPL–DTA 2–2	PRI–MAM 0–1; Firmino 62'	GAI–PET 0–2; Haia 18'; Abel Campos 47'	PHU–FHL 3–0	PRI–MAM 0–1	INT–PRM 2–2; Zandú x2	SAG–DCS 3–0	19
4	31/3/85	7/4/85	7/4/85	7/4/85	6/4/85	31/3/85	6/4/85	6/4/85	7/4/85	7/4/85	6/4/85	6/4/85	6/4/85	7/4/85	13
4	GAI–DBG 0–0	DCH–SAG 2–2; Toninho 64'; Malé 85'	DTA–DCS 2–1; Moniz 72'	DTA–DCS 2–1; Saúca 24'; Marito 82'	PRI–FHL 1–0	GAI–DBG 0–0	INT–LPL 2–0; Túbia 33'; Mingo 79'	INT–LPL 2–0	MAM–PET 1–2; Ralph pen.	MAM–PET 1–2; Abel Campos 47'; Jesus 88'	PRM–PHU 0–0	PRI–FHL 1–0; Manuel Martins '	PRM–PHU 0–0	DCH–SAG 2–2; Abreu 20'; Quintino 55'	13
5	14/4/85	14/4/85	14/4/85	13/4/85	29/5/85	14/4/85	13/4/85	14/4/85	14/4/85	29/5/85	14/4/85	29/5/85	29/5/85	14/4/85	23
5	DBG–MAM 0–0	DCS–DCH 0–2	DCS–DCH 0–2	INT–DTA 3–0	FHL–PET 2–2; Ndisso ' Salvador pen.	SAG–GAI 1–2	INT–DTA 3–0; Pirocas 13'; Túbia 17' 87'	PHU–LPL 7–1	DBG–MAM 0–0	FHL–PET 2–2; Jesus 6' ?pen.	PHU–LPL 7–1	PRM–PRI 1–2; Ndunguidi ' Vieira Dias '	PRM–PRI 1–2; Daniel '	SAG–GAI 1–2	23
6	23/4/85	20/4/85	15/4/85	20/4/85	23/4/85	15/4/85	21/4/85	15/6/85	21/4/85	15/6/85	21/4/85	15/6/85	15/6/85	21/4/85	13
6	FHL–DBG 4–0	DTA–DCH 0–1; Malé 32'	GAI–DCS 3–0	DTA–DCH 0–1	FHL–DBG 4–0; Maria 31' 72'; Pedrito 83'; Catarino 88'	GAI–DCS 3–0	INT–PHU 0–0	LPL–PRI 1–1	MAM–SAG 1–1; Panzo 7'	PET–PRM 1–0; Jesus 40'	INT–PHU 0–0	LPL–PRI 1–1	PET–PRM 1–0	MAM–SAG 1–1; Quintino 68'	13
7	28/4/85	28/4/85	28/4/85	28/4/85	29/4/85	28/4/85	28/4/85	27/4/85	28/4/85	27/4/85	28/4/85	28/4/85	28/4/85	29/4/85	23
7	DBG–PRM 2–2	DCH–GAI 3–0; Basílio 37' 72'; Toninho 54'	DCS–MAM 2–0	PHU–DTA 0–0	SAG–FHL 2–0	DCH–GAI 3–0	PRI–INT 3–4; Raúl 3'; Túbia 23' 65' ?	PET–LPL 5–0	DCS–MAM 2–0	PET–LPL 5–0; Jesus 17' 44' 76'; Abel Campos 53'; Bodú 80'	PHU–DTA 0–0	PRI–INT 3–4; Amândio 22'; Ndunguidi pen. Manuel Martins 86'	DBG–PRM 2–2	SAG–FHL 2–0; Abreu 4'; Rui Paulino 66'	23
8	5/5/85	5/5/85	5/5/85	4/5/85	5/5/85	4/5/85	5/5/85	5/5/85	5/5/85	5/5/85	4/5/85	4/5/85	5/5/85	5/5/85	17
8	LPL–DBG 2–2	MAM–DCH 1–2; Arsénio 51' 64'	FHL–DCS 3–1	GAI–DTA 0–0	FHL–DCS 3–1	GAI–DTA 0–0	INT–PET 1–1; Sungura '	LPL–DBG 2–2	MAM–DCH 1–2; Celson 50'	INT–PET 1–1; Haia 4'	PRI–PHU 2–1; Aníbal 70'pen.	PRI–PHU 2–1; Ndunguidi 38'pen. 76'	PRM–SAG 0–1	PRM–SAG 0–1	17
9		12/5/85		12/5/85	12/5/85	12/5/85		22/6/85	12/5/85	11/5/85	11/5/85	12/5/85		22/6/85	
9	DBG–INT –	DCH–FHL 1–0; Malé 38' pen.	DCS–PRM 1–1	DTA–PRI 1–2; Coreano 45'	DCH–FHL 1–0	MAM–GAI 1–0	DBG–INT –	SAG–LPL 1–1; Miguel o.g.	MAM–GAI 1–0; Ralph 15'pen.	PET–PHU 1–2; Jesus 7'	PET–PHU 1–2; Didí 14'; Picas 60'	DTA–PRI 1–2; Cristo 17' o.g. Ivo 82'pen.	DCS–PRM 1–1	SAG–LPL 1–1; Lumbua	
10	19/5/85	19/5/85	19/5/85	18/5/85	19/5/85	19/5/85	18/5/85	19/5/85	18/5/85	19/5/85	19/5/85	19/5/85	19/5/85	18/5/85	22
10	PHU–DBG 4–2	PRM–DCH 2–1	LPL–DCS 3–0	DTA–MAM 1–0; Saúca 15'	FHL–GAI 3–2	FHL–GAI 3–2	INT–SAG 1–3	LPL–DCS 3–0	DTA–MAM 1–0	PET–PRI 0–0	PHU–DBG 4–2	PET–PRI 0–0	PRM–DCH 2–1	INT–SAG 1–3	22
11	25/5/85	26/5/85	26/5/85	26/5/85	26/5/85	20/5/85	26/5/85	26/5/85	26/5/85	26/5/85	25/5/85	25/5/85	20/5/85	25/5/85	8
11	DBG–PRI 1–0; Zezé '	DCH–LPL 0–1	DCS–INT 0–2	DTA–PET 1–0; Saúca 13'	MAM–FHL 0–0	GAI–PRM 0–0	DCS–INT 0–2	DCH–LPL 0–1; David 4'	MAM–FHL 0–0	DTA–PET 1–0	SAG–PHU 2–1	DBG–PRI 1–0	GAI–PRM 0–0	SAG–PHU 2–1	8
12	1/6/85	1/6/85	2/6/85	2/6/85	2/6/85	2/6/85	1/6/85	2/6/85	2/6/85	1/6/85	2/6/85	2/6/85	2/6/85	2/6/85	22
12	PET–DBG 4–1; Marques 40'	INT–DCH 0–1; Basílio 80'	PHU–DCS 3–1	FHL–DTA 3–0	FHL–DTA 3–0; Emílio 8'; Maria 39' 69'	LPL–GAI 1–1	INT–DCH 0–1	LPL–GAI 1–1	PRM–MAM 3–0	PET–DBG 4–1; Nejó 32'; Abel Campos ' Bavi 57'; Haia 81'	PHU–DCS 3–1	PRI–SAG 4–0	PRM–MAM 3–0	PRI–SAG 4–0	22
13	9/6/85	9/6/85	9/6/85	9/6/85	8/6/85	3/6/85	3/6/85	9/6/85	9/6/85	8/6/85	9/6/85	9/6/85	8/6/85	8/6/85	24
13	DTA–DBG 1–2; Nelson 7'; Pelé 61'	DCH–PHU 3–0; Malé 15'pen. França 44'; Basílio '	DCS–PRI 1–1	DTA–DBG 1–2	PRM–FHL 3–2	GAI–INT 0–3	GAI–INT 0–3	MAM–LPL 3–2	MAM–LPL 3–2	SAG–PET 1–2	DCH–PHU 3–0	DCS–PRI 1–1	PRM–FHL 3–2	SAG–PET 1–2	24
14	29/6/85	24/7/85	24/7/85	30/6/85	14/9/85	29/6/85	30/6/85	14/9/85	30/6/85	24/7/85	29/6/85	24/7/85	30/6/85	29/6/85	18
14	SAG–DBG 2–1; Ilídio '	DCH–PRI 1–2; Quim Sebas 20'	PET–DCS 0–1; Yoba 50'	PRM–DTA 2–0	LPL–FHL 1–3; Espírito Santo ' Pedrito x2	GAI–PHU 2–1; Marques 45'; Geraldo 75'	MAM–INT 1–1; Túbia '	LPL–FHL 1–3; Moreno '	MAM–INT 1–1; Panzo 11'	PET–DCS 0–1	GAI–PHU 2–1; Cândido 23'	DCH–PRI 1–2; Vieira Dias 62'; Barbosa 87'	PRM–DTA 2–0; Agostinho ' Fidèle '	SAG–DBG 2–1; Quintino ' Serginho '	18
15	7/7/85	31/7/85	7/7/85	7/7/85	6/7/85	17/7/85	6/7/85	7/7/85	7/7/85	31/7/85	7/7/85	17/7/85	7/7/85	7/7/85	16
15	DBG–DCS 1–0	DCH–PET 1–0; Adriano 65'	DBG–DCS 1–0	DTA–SAG 1–2	INT–FHL 4–4; Emílio ' Ndisso x2 Salvador '	PRI–GAI –	INT–FHL 4–4; Feliciano ' Lourenço ' Quinito x2	LPL–PRM 1–2	PHU–MAM 0–0	DCH–PET 1–0	PHU–MAM 0–0	PRI–GAI –	LPL–PRM 1–2	DTA–SAG 1–2	16
16	14/7/85	14/7/85	11/9/85	7/8/85	14/7/85	14/7/85	14/7/85	7/8/85	14/8/85	14/7/85	14/7/85	14/8/85	14/7/85	11/9/85	12
16	DBG–DCH 3–1	DBG–DCH 3–1	DCS–SAG 1–0; Joãozinho '	DTA–LPL 1–1; Saúca 10'	FHL–PHU 1–0	PET–GAI 2–0	PRM–INT 1–0	DTA–LPL 1–1; Lucunga 30'	MAM–PRI 1–0	PET–GAI 2–0	FHL–PHU 1–0	MAM–PRI 1–0	PRM–INT 1–0	DCS–SAG 1–0	12
17	21/7/85	20/7/85	21/7/85	21/7/85	21/7/85	21/7/85	21/7/85	21/7/85	21/7/85	21/7/85	21/7/85	21/7/85	21/7/85	20/7/85	18
17	DBG–GAI 1–0	SAG–DCH 0–1; Chiquinho '	DCS–DTA 1–0	DCS–DTA 1–0	FHL–PRI 3–1	DBG–GAI 1–0	LPL–INT 2–5	LPL–INT 2–5	PET–MAM 0–1	PET–MAM 0–1	PHU–PRM 1–2	FHL–PRI 3–1	PHU–PRM 1–2	SAG–DCH 0–1	18
18	11/9/85	28/7/85	28/7/85	28/7/85	27/7/85	19/8/85	28/7/85	28/7/85	11/9/85	27/7/85	28/7/85	27/7/85	27/7/85	19/8/85	15
18	MAM–DBG 0–0	DCH–DCS 4–0; Basílio 30' 35'; Chiquinho 50'; Arsénio 63'	DCH–DCS 4–0	DTA–INT 1–3; Vieira Dias 83'	PET–FHL 1–1	GAI–SAG 0–0	DTA–INT 1–3; Mingo 28'; Raúl 71'pen. Paciência 72'	LPL–PHU 1–1	MAM–DBG 0–0	PET–FHL 1–1	LPL–PHU 1–1	PRI–PRM 1–2; Barbosa '	PRI–PRM 1–2; Chiquinho ' Fidèle '	GAI–SAG 0–0	15
19	3/8/85	4/8/85	4/8/85	4/8/85	3/8/85	4/8/85	4/8/85	4/8/85	3/8/85	4/8/85	4/8/85	4/8/85	4/8/85	3/8/85	22
19	DBG–FHL 3–0; WALKOVER	DCH–DTA 3–0; Quim Sebas 2'; Docas 4'; Toninho 74'	DCS–GAI 0–1	DCH–DTA 3–0	DBG–FHL 3–0; WALKOVER	DCS–GAI 0–1	PHU–INT 5–0	PRI–LPL 4–1; Jamaica 80'	SAG–MAM 3–1	PRM–PET 1–0	PHU–INT 5–0; Picas x4 Saavedra '	PRI–LPL 4–1; Manuel Martins ' Ndunguidi 54'; Vieira Dias x2	PRM–PET 1–0; Fidèle 40'	SAG–MAM 3–1; Quintino x2	22
20	10/8/85	2/9/85	11/8/85	10/8/85	14/8/85	2/9/85	11/8/85	11/8/85	11/8/85	11/8/85	10/8/85	11/8/85	10/8/85	14/8/85	22
20	PRM–DBG 1–2; Zezé 1'; Didí '	GAI–DCH 0–2; Docas 61'; Arsénio 86'	MAM–DCS 4–1; Zacarias '	DTA–PHU 2–0; Coreano 47' 70'	FHL–SAG 3–1	GAI–DCH 0–2	INT–PRI 3–1; Raúl ' Mingo 30' 39'	LPL–PET 1–1	MAM–DCS 4–1; Julião ' Maria ' Panzo x2	LPL–PET 1–1	DTA–PHU 2–0	INT–PRI 3–1; Mané '	PRM–DBG 1–2; Zandú 24'	FHL–SAG 3–1	22
21	1/9/85	1/9/85	1/9/85	31/8/85	1/9/85	31/8/85	1/9/85	1/9/85	1/9/85	1/9/85	1/9/85	1/9/85	31/8/85	31/8/85	17
21	DBG–LPL 0–0	DCH–MAM 3–1; Arsénio 9'; Adriano 54'; Lucas 87'	DCS–FHL 0–4	DTA–GAI 1–1; Saúca 87'	DCS–FHL 0–4	DTA–GAI 1–1; Nimí 30'	PET–INT 0–1	DBG–LPL 0–0	DCH–MAM 3–1; Panzo 18'	PET–INT 0–1	PHU–PRI 1–1; Carlitos 42'	PHU–PRI 1–1; Manuel Martins 65'	SAG–PRM 3–1	SAG–PRM 3–1	17
22	8/9/85	8/9/85	7/9/85	7/9/85	8/9/85	23/9/85	8/9/85	8/9/85	23/9/85	8/9/85	8/9/85	7/9/85	7/9/85	8/9/85	13
22	INT–DBG 1–2; Babá ' Didí '	FHL–DCH 2–0	PRM–DCS 2–0	PRI–DTA 0–1; Saúca 33'	FHL–DCH 2–0; Raimundo 9'; Espírito Santo 38'	GAI–MAM 0–1	INT–DBG 1–2; Mingo '	LPL–SAG 0–2	GAI–MAM 0–1	PHU–PET 0–2	PHU–PET 0–2	PRI–DTA 0–1	PRM–DCS 2–0	LPL–SAG 0–2	13
23	22/9/85	22/9/85	22/9/85	22/9/85	29/9/85	29/9/85	22/9/85	22/9/85	22/9/85	22/9/85	22/9/85	22/9/85	22/9/85	22/9/85	9
23	DBG–PHU 1–0	DCH–PRM 0–1	DCS–LPL 1–0	MAM–DTA 1–0	GAI–FHL 2–1	GAI–FHL 2–1	SAG–INT 1–0	DCS–LPL 1–0	MAM–DTA 1–0	PRI–PET 0–1	DBG–PHU 1–0	PRI–PET 0–1	DCH–PRM 0–1	SAG–INT 1–0	9
24	29/9/85	29/9/85	28/9/85	28/9/85	29/9/85	29/9/85	28/9/85	29/9/85	29/9/85	28/9/85	29/9/85	29/9/85	29/9/85	29/9/85	17
24	PRI–DBG 1–1; Dinis '	LPL–DCH 1–1	INT–DCS 3–3; Joanes ' Sorry 65'; Yoba '	PET–DTA 1–0	FHL–MAM 1–0	PRM–GAI 1–0	INT–DCS 3–3; Pedro Afonso 10'; Mendinho 66' ?	LPL–DCH 1–1	FHL–MAM 1–0	PET–DTA 1–0	PHU–SAG 3–1	PRI–DBG 1–1; Vieira Dias '	PRM–GAI 1–0	PHU–SAG 3–1	17
25	12/10/85	13/10/85	13/10/85	13/10/85	13/10/85	13/10/85	13/10/85	13/10/85	13/10/85	12/10/85	13/10/85	12/10/85	13/10/85	12/10/85	23
25	DBG–PET 0–1	DCH–INT 2–2; Docas 4'; Chiquinho '	DCS–PHU 3–0	DTA–FHL 10–1; Coreano x3 Kansas ' Maradona x2 Marito ' Saúca ' Toy x2	DTA–FHL 10–1	GAI–LPL 1–0	DCH–INT 2–2; Túbia 52'; Mingo 58'	GAI–LPL 1–0	MAM–PRM 0–0	DBG–PET 0–1	DCS–PHU 3–0	SAG–PRI 2–1; Vieira Dias 23'	MAM–PRM 0–0	SAG–PRI 2–1; Quintino ' Rui Paulino 64'	23
26	20/10/85	20/10/85	19/10/85	20/10/85	20/10/85	19/10/85	19/10/85	20/10/85	20/10/85	20/10/85	20/10/85	19/10/85	20/10/85	20/10/85	18
26	DBG–DTA 1–1	PHU–DCH 3–0	PRI–DCS 2–1; Sorry '	DBG–DTA 1–1	FHL–PRM 0–1	INT–GAI 4–2	INT–GAI 4–2	LPL–MAM 1–1	LPL–MAM 1–1	PET–SAG 1–0	PHU–DCH 3–0; Lilas 20'; Benjamim 75'; Aníbal 85'	PRI–DCS 2–1; Ed.Machado 6'; Ndunguidi 84'	FHL–PRM 0–1; Zandú 70'	PET–SAG 1–0	18
T		40	20	29	44			26	21	33	38		34	37	

=== Most goals scored in a single match ===
As of 13 October 1985

Player	For	Against	Result	Round	Date
4 goals (Poker)
(Angola) Picas	Petro do Huambo	Inter de Luanda	5-0	19	4 August 1985
3 goals (Hat-trick)
(Angola) Jesus	Petro de Luanda	Leões do Planalto	5-0	7	27 April 1985
(Angola) Túbia	Inter de Luanda	1º de Agosto	3-4	7	28 April 1985
(Angola) Coreano	Desp. da TAAG	Ferroviário da Huíla	10-1	25	13 October 1985

=== Top scorers ===
Rank	Scorer	Club	Goals
1	(Angola) Jesus	Petro de Luanda	14
2	(Angola) Picas	Petro do Huambo	13
2	(Angola) Quintino	Sagrada Esperança	13
2	(Angola) Túbia	Inter de Luanda	13
3	(Angola) Basílio	Desp. da Chela	11

== Champions ==
1985 Girabola winner

2nd title

Squad: Agostinho, Águas, André, Daniel Fidéle, Fusso, Garcia, Melanchton, Moisés, Nando, Sarmento, Simões, Vicy, Zandú
Head coach: Rui Rodrigues
