= 2006 Girabola =

Girabola
- Season: 2006 (Feb 25–Nov 26)
- Champions: 1º de Agosto
- Relegated: Bravos do Maquis; Progresso do Sambizanga; Sporting de Cabinda
- 2007 CAF Champions League: 1º de Agosto (winner); Petro de Luanda (runner-up)
- 2007 CAF Confederation Cup: Interclube (3rd place)
- Matches played: 182
- Goals scored: 342 (1.88 per match)
- Top goalscorer: Manucho Gonçalves (16 goals)
- Biggest home win: Int Lua 5–0 Aca Soy (27 Aug 2006); Ben Lub 5–0 Spo Cab (15 Oct 2006)
- Biggest away win: Pro Sam 0–5 Pet Lua (22 Nov 2006)
- Highest scoring: ASA 3–4 Ben Lub (27 Aug 2006)

The 2006 Girabola was the 28th season of top-tier football in Angola. The season ran from 25 February to 26 November 2006. Sagrada Esperança were the defending champions.

The league comprised 14 teams, the bottom three of which were relegated to the 2007 Gira Angola.

Primeiro de Agosto were crowned champions, while Bravos do Maquis, Progresso do Sambizanga and Sporting de Cabinda were relegated. Manucho Gonçalves of Petro Luanda finished as the top scorer with 16 goals.

== Changes from the 2005 season ==
Relegated: Académica do Lobito, Petro do Huambo, Sporting do Bié
Promoted: Bravos do Maquis, Académica do Soyo, Benfica do Lubango

Locations of the 2006 Girabola teams

== League table ==
Pos	Team	Pld	W	D	L	GF	GA	GD	Pts	Qualification or relegation
1	Primeiro de Agosto (C)	26	16	8	2	34	15	+19	56	Qualification for Champions League
2	Petro de Luanda	26	12	10	4	32	17	+15	46	Qualification for Champions League
3	Interclube	26	12	8	6	36	21	+15	44	Qualification for Confederation Cup
4	Benfica do Lubango	26	11	6	9	33	28	+5	39	
5	ASA	26	10	6	10	31	26	+5	36	
6	Sagrada Esperança	26	9	9	8	17	16	+1	36	
7	Desportivo da Huíla	26	10	6	10	24	24	0	36	
8	Benfica de Luanda	26	10	2	14	23	28	−5	32	
9	Académica do Soyo	26	8	8	10	19	27	−8	32	
10	Primeiro de Maio	26	7	10	9	22	23	−1	31	
11	Atlético do Namibe	26	6	13	7	22	25	−3	31	
12	Bravos do Maquis (R)	26	6	12	8	14	21	−7	30	Relegation to Provincial stages
13	Progresso do Sambizanga (R)	26	5	9	12	20	31	−11	24	Relegation to Provincial stages
14	Sporting de Cabinda (R)	26	3	7	16	15	40	−25	16	Relegation to Provincial stages

Updated to match(es) played on 26 November 2006. Source: Girabola.com
Rules for classification: 1) Points; 2) Head-to-head points; 3) Head-to-head goal difference; 4) Goal difference; 5) Goals scored; 6) Fair-play points; 7) Play-off.
(C) Champions; (R) Relegated

== Results ==
Home \ Away	ACS	ASA	ATN	BEN	BLB	BRA	DES	INT	PET	PRI	MAI	PRO	SAG	SCC
Académica do Soyo	—	0–2	0–1	1–2	1–0	0–0	1–0	1–1	1–0	2–2	2–1	1–0	0–0	1–0
ASA	5–1	—	1–2	0–1	3–4	0–1	4–0	2–1	1–2	3–1	1–0	1–1	0–0	3–1
Atlético do Namibe	2–0	0–0	—	2–0	0–1	0–0	1–1	0–0	0–1	0–0	1–1	1–1	1–0	2–1
Benfica de Luanda	0–3	3–1	2–0	—	0–2	1–0	1–0	2–2	0–3	0–1	0–1	0–1	2–0	1–0
Benfica do Lubango	2–0	0–1	2–0	0–3	—	3–0	0–0	0–0	1–1	2–1	1–2	1–1	1–1	5–0
Bravos do Maquis	0–0	1–0	2–2	1–0	2–1	—	1–1	0–1	0–0	0–0	0–0	0–1	0–0	0–0
Desportivo da Huíla	1–0	0–1	2–0	2–1	2–0	1–0	—	1–0	0–1	0–1	1–1	2–0	1–0	2–0
Interclube	5–0	3–0	2–2	2–1	0–3	0–0	1–0	—	0–1	0–1	3–0	2–1	3–1	3–1
Petro de Luanda	1–1	1–0	1–0	1–0	2–2	2–1	1–1	0–1	—	0–0	2–1	2–1	2–0	0–0
Primeiro de Agosto	0–0	3–1	2–0	1–0	2–0	2–0	2–1	2–1	1–0	—	0–0	2–1	0–0	2–1
Primeiro de Maio	1–0	0–0	1–1	1–0	4–0	2–2	2–0	0–0	1–1	1–3	—	0–0	0–1	2–0
Progresso do Sambizanga	0–0	0–0	1–1	2–3	0–1	0–1	2–2	1–2	0–5	0–2	2–0	—	1–1	1–0
Sagrada Esperança	1–0	0–1	2–1	1–0	2–0	3–0	1–0	0–0	1–1	0–1	1–0	1–0	—	0–0
Sporting de Cabinda	0–3	0–0	1–1	0–0	0–1	1–2	2–3	1–3	2–1	2–2	1–0	0–2	1–0	—

Updated to match(es) played on 6 November 2006. Source: girabola.com
Legend: Blue = home team win; Yellow = draw; Red = away team win.

== Season statistics ==
=== Top scorers ===
Rank	Scorer	Club	Goals
1	(Angola) Manucho	Petro Luanda	16
2	(Democratic Republic of the Congo) Sérge	Benfica Luanda	10
3	(Angola) Gazeta	1º de Agosto	10
4	(Angola) Alberto	Benfica Lubango	7
4	(Angola) Adolfo	Atlético Namibe	7

=== Hat-tricks ===
Player	For	Against	Result	Date
Fofaná	ASA	Primeiro de Agosto	3-1	22 November 2006
Lunguinha	Atlético do Namibe	Desportivo da Huíla	3-1	2 February 2006

2006 Girabola winner
Clube Desportivo Primeiro de Agosto
9th title

Squad: Abel, Bebeto, Bena, Danny, Elísio, Gazeta, Henry Milanzi, Ian Bakala, Joãozinho, Josemar, Kumaca, Locó, Mano, Mbinda, Moreno, Nelo, Neruda, Patrício, Pitchu, Riquinho, Roger, Rômulo, Tião, Vado, Zé Augusto
Head coach: Jan Brouwer
