= David Magalhães =

Angolan footballer (born 1988)

Personal information
- Full name: David Dinis Magalhães
- Date of birth: 24 February 1982 (age 44)
- Place of birth: Luanda, Angola
- Position: Forward

Senior career*
Years	Team	Apps	(Gls)
2008–	Petro Luanda		
2012–	Primeiro de Agosto		
2014–	C.R. Caála		
2015–	Domant FC		
2015–	ASA		
2016–	Progresso Sambizanga		
2017–	Progresso LS		

International career
2009–	Angola	3	(0)
- * Club domestic league appearances and goals

David Dinis Magalhães (born 24 February 1988 in Luanda, Angola) is an Angolan retired footballer. He played as a forward. He used to be a member of Angolan internationals.

== International career ==
In 2010 Africa Cup of Nations, he was called to Angola national football team by head coach Manuel José de Jesus.

== Honours ==
- Girabola: 2008, 2009
- SuperTaça de Angola: 2009, 2010
