= 1988 Girabola =

Girabola 1988
- Season: 1988 (–)
- Champions: Petro Luanda
- Relegated: Desp Benguela; Dínamos KS; Fabril; Inter Namibe
- 1989 African Cup of Champions Clubs: Petro Luanda (Girabola winner)
- Matches played: 182
- Top goalscorer: Manuel (16 goals)

The 1988 Girabola was the tenth season of top-tier football competition in Angola. Atlético Petróleos de Luanda were the defending champions.

The league comprised 14 teams, the bottom three of which were relegated.

Petro de Luanda were crowned champions, winning their 5th title, and third in a row, while Desportivo de Benguela, Dínamos do Kwanza Sul, Fabril do Uíge and Inter do Namibe were relegated.

Manuel of Primeiro de Agosto finished as the top scorer with 16 goals.

== Changes from the 1987 season ==
Relegated: Desportivo da Chela, Progresso do Sambizanga, União do Bié
Promoted: Desportivo de Benguela, Fabril do Uíge and Inter do Namibe

Locations of the 1988 Girabola teams

== League table ==
Pos	Team	Pld	W	D	L	GF	GA	GD	Pts	Qualification or relegation
1	Petro de Luanda (C)	26	19	3	4	62	20	+42	41	Qualification for Champions Cup
2	Ferroviário da Huíla	25	17	4	4	48	20	+28	38	
3	Primeiro de Agosto	26	14	5	7	51	35	+16	33	
4	Primeiro de Maio	26	14	3	9	36	23	+13	31	
5	FC de Cabinda	22	8	9	5	22	19	+3	25	
6	Inter de Luanda (Note: Name later changed to Interclube)	25	10	6	9	22	26	−4	26	
7	Petro do Huambo	26	9	10	7	37	23	+14	28	
8	Mambroa (Note: Name later reverted to its original Benfica do Huambo)	24	9	7	8	29	27	+2	25	
9	TAAG (Note: Name later reverted to its original ASA)	26	9	5	12	43	29	+14	23	
10	Sagrada Esperança	23	9	2	12	24	28	−4	20	
11	Desportivo de Benguela (Note: Name later reverted to its original Sporting de Benguela) (R)	25	6	7	12	22	44	−22	19	Relegation to Provincial stages
12	Dínamos do CS (R)	24	6	3	15	18	40	−22	15	Relegation to Provincial stages
13	Inter do Namibe (R)	25	5	6	14	24	55	−31	16	Relegation to Provincial stages
14	Fabril do Uíge (R)	23	2	2	19	13	62	−49	6	Relegation to Provincial stages

Updated to match(es) played on 22 November 1988. Source: Girabola.com
Rules for classification: 1) Points; 2) Head-to-head points; 3) Head-to-head goal difference; 4) Goal difference; 5) Goals scored; 6) Fair-play points; 7) Play-off.
(C) Champions; (R) Relegated

== Results ==
Home \ Away	DBG	DCS	DTA	FAB	FCC	FHL	INA	INT	MAM	PET	PHU	PRI	PRM	SAG
Desportivo de Benguela	—	0–0	2–1	1–0	1–1	2–5	0–1	0–0	2–0	0–0	1–0	1–1	0–2	1–1
Dínamos do C.S.	1–0	—	0–0	0–0	1–2	2–1	2–0	2–0	1–2	1–2	2–0	0–2	0–3	0–0
Desportivo da TAAG	7–1	3–1	—	10–1	2–3	1–1	5–1	1–0	0–0	0–1	1–1	0–1	0–1	3–2
Fabril do Uíge	0–3	1–0	1–2	—		0–2	0–3 (Note: Inter do Namibe was awarded a 3–0 win)	1–1	0–3 (Note: Mambroa was awarded a 3–0 win)	0–3	1–1	1–3	1–0	
FC de Cabinda	1–0	1–1	1–1	2–0	—	1–1	1–1	1–0	0–0	0–0	2–2	2–1	0–1	1–0
Ferroviário da Huíla	6–0	4–0	2–1	3–0		—	2–2	0–1	1–0	3–2	0–0	2–1	3–2	2–1
Inter do Namibe	3–1	0–2	1–2	3–0	0–3 (Note: FC de Cabinda was awarded a 3–0 win)	0–1	—	0–0	0–2	1–2	1–1	1–2	1–1	2–0
Inter de Luanda	2–1	2–0	1–0	1–0	0–0	0–2	1–1	—	2–0	0–7	2–0	3–2	0–1	1–0
Mambroa	0–0	2–0	1–0	2–1	0–0	1–2	4–0	0–2	—	1–1	2–0	1–1	3–5	1–0
Petro de Luanda	3–1	3–1	1–0	4–2	2–0	1–2	8–0	3–2	3–0	—	0–1	2–3	3–2	1–0
Petro do Huambo	1–1	4–1	2–1	7–0	1–0	0–1	6–0	1–1	1–1	0–1	—	1–0	3–1	2–0
Primeiro de Agosto	5–1	4–0	1–0	6–1	2–1	1–0	0–0	6–2	2–2	0–6	1–1	—	1–3	2–1
Primeiro de Maio	1–2	1–0	2–0	1–0	0–0	1–0	2–0	4–1	1–1	0–1	1–0	0–1	—	0–1
Sagrada Esperança	2–0	3–0	0–2	3–2	2–0	0–2	1–0	0–0	2–1	0–2	1–1	3–2	1–0	—

Updated to match(es) played on 22 November 1988. Source: girabola.com
Legend: Blue = home team win; Yellow = draw; Red = away team win.

== Season statistics ==
=== Scorers ===
R/T
R/T	DBG	DCS	DTA	FAB	FCC	FHL	INA	INT	MAM	PET	PHU	PRI	PRM	SAG	TOTAL
1	21/2/88	21/2/88	21/2/88		13/4/88	21/2/88	13/4/88		20/2/88	20/2/88	21/2/88	21/2/88	21/2/88	21/2/88	_{7}21
1	DBG–PRM 0–2	PHU–DCS 4–1	FHL–DTA 2–1	FAB–INT 1–1	INA–FCC 0–3; WALKOVER	FHL–DTA 2–1	INA–FCC 0–3; WALKOVER	FAB–INT 1–1; Felito '	PET–MAM 0–3	PET–MAM 0–3; Saavedra x2	PHU–DCS 4–1	PRI–SAG 2–1; Manuel Martins '	DBG–PRM 0–2	PRI–SAG 2–1	_{7}21
2	28/2/88	28/2/88	28/2/88	28/2/88	27/2/88	1/5/88	27/2/88	27/2/88	28/2/88	28/2/88	27/2/88	28/2/88	28/2/88	1/5/88	_{2}16
2	PET–DBG 3–1	DCS–PRI 0–2	MAM–DTA 1–0	PRM–FAB 1–0	FCC–PHU 2–2	SAG–FHL 0–2; Dinho ' Mavó '	INT–INA 1–1	INT–INA 1–1	MAM–DTA 1–0	PET–DBG 3–1	FCC–PHU 2–2	DCS–PRI 0–2	PRM–FAB 1–0	SAG–FHL 0–2	_{2}16
3	5/3/88	8/6/88	5/3/88	5/6/88	6/3/88	8/6/88	5/6/88	6/3/88	5/3/88	6/3/88	6/3/88	6/3/88	6/3/88	5/3/88	_{1}23
3	DTA–DBG 7–1	FHL–DCS 4–0	DTA–DBG 7–1	FAB–INA 0–3; WALKOVER	PRI–FCC 2–1	FHL–DCS 4–0	FAB–INA 0–3; WALKOVER	PHU–INT 1–1	SAG–MAM 2–1	PRM–PET 0–1; Avelino '	PHU–INT 1–1	PRI–FCC 2–1	PRM–PET 0–1	SAG–MAM 2–1	_{1}23
4	12/3/88	13/3/88	12/3/88	13/3/88	12/3/88	12/3/88	16/6/88	13/3/88	13/3/88	13/3/88	16/6/88	13/3/88	12/3/88	12/3/88	_{4}17
4	DBG–SAG 1–1	MAM–DCS 2–0	DTA–PRM 0–1	FAB–PET 0–3	FCC–FHL 1–1	FCC–FHL 1–1	INA–PHU 1–1; Custódio 15'	INT–PRI 3–2; Jesus x2	MAM–DCS 2–0	FAB–PET 0–3	INA–PHU 1–1; Picas 35'	INT–PRI 3–2	DTA–PRM 0–1	DBG–SAG 1–1	_{4}17
5	20/3/88	20/3/88	20/3/88	20/3/88	20/3/88	20/3/88	19/3/88	20/3/88	20/3/88	20/3/88	20/3/88	19/3/88	19/3/88	19/3/88	_{3}14
5	DCS–DBG 1–0	DCS–DBG 1–0	PET–DTA 1–0	FAB–PHU 1–1	MAM–FCC 0–0	FHL–INT 0–1	PRI–INA 6–2	FHL–INT 0–1	MAM–FCC 0–0	PET–DTA 1–0	FAB–PHU 1–1	PRI–INA 6–2; Manuel Martins x3	PRM–SAG 0–1	PRM–SAG 0–1	_{3}14
6	1/5/88	1/5/88	26/3/88	26/3/88	1/5/88	26/3/88	26/3/88	26/3/88	26/3/88	26/3/88	26/3/88	26/3/88	1/5/88	26/3/88	_{7}22
6	DBG–FCC 1–1; Enoque pen.	DCS–PRM 0–3	DTA–FAB 10–1	DTA–FAB 10–1	DBG–FCC 1–1; Bulau '	INA–FHL 0–1	INA–FHL 0–1	INT–MAM 2–0; Mendinho x2	INT–MAM 2–0	SAG–PET 0–2	PHU–PRI 1–0	PHU–PRI 1–0	DCS–PRM 0–3; Nelson ' Zé Maria ' Zé Pedro '	SAG–PET 0–2	_{7}22
7	3/4/88	4/5/88	3/4/88	3/4/88	5/4/88	1/6/88	3/4/88	3/4/88	3/4/88	4/5/88	1/6/88	3/4/88	5/4/88	3/4/88	_{1}18
7	DBG–INT 0–0	PET–DCS 3–1	DTA–SAG 3–2	FAB–PRI 1–3	FCC–PRM 0–1	FHL–PHU 0–0	MAM–INA 4–0	DBG–INT 0–0	MAM–INA 4–0	PET–DCS 3–1	FHL–PHU 0–0	FAB–PRI 1–3	FCC–PRM 0–1; Zé Pedro 78'	DTA–SAG 3–2	_{1}18
8	10/4/88	10/4/88	10/4/88	9/4/88	20/4/88	9/4/88	10/4/88	10/4/88	10/4/88	20/4/88	10/4/88	9/4/88	10/4/88	9/4/88	_{2}16
8	INA–DBG 3–1	DCS–DTA 0–0	DCS–DTA 0–0	SAG–FAB 3–2	PET–FCC 2–0	PRI–FHL 1–0	INA–DBG 3–1	PRM–INT 2–0	PHU–MAM 1–1	PET–FCC 2–0; Abel Campos ' Jesus 35'	PHU–MAM 1–1	PRI–FHL 1–0	PRM–INT 2–0	SAG–FAB 3–2	_{2}16
9	17/4/88	28/5/88	16/4/88	20/4/88	16/4/88	20/4/88	16/4/88	17/4/88	17/4/88	17/4/88	17/4/88	17/4/88	16/4/88	28/5/88	_{10}21
9	DBG–PHU 1–0	SAG–DCS 3–0	DTA–FCC 2–3	FHL–FAB 3–0	DTA–FCC 2–3	FHL–FAB 3–0; Bartolomeu ' Didí ' Mavó '	INA–PRM 1–1	PET–INT 3–2; Jesus x2	MAM–PRI 1–1; Maria pen.	PET–INT 3–2; Paulão ' Jesus pen. Abel Campos 75'	DBG–PHU 1–0	MAM–PRI 1–1; Ndunguidi pen.	INA–PRM 1–1	SAG–DCS 3–0	_{10}21
10	23/4/88	24/4/88	24/4/88	24/4/88	23/4/88	24/4/88	18/6/88	24/4/88	24/4/88	18/6/88	24/4/88	23/4/88	24/4/88	23/4/88	_{11}16
10	PRI–DBG 5–1; Martinho '	FAB–DCS 1–0	INT–DTA 1–0	FAB–DCS 1–0	FCC–SAG 1–0; Adriano '	MAM–FHL 1–2	INA–PET 1–2; Correia '	INT–DTA 1–0; Pedro Afonso '	MAM–FHL 1–2	INA–PET 1–2; Jesus ' Saavedra '	PRM–PHU 1–0	PRI–DBG 5–1; Manuel ' pen. Nelito Kwanza ' Novato ' Pelé x2	PRM–PHU 1–0	FCC–SAG 1–0	_{11}16
11	8/5/88	8/5/88	7/5/88	8/5/88	8/5/88	8/5/88	7/5/88	7/5/88	8/5/88	8/5/88	8/5/88	8/5/88	8/5/88	7/5/88	_{4}20
11	FHL–DBG 6–0	DCS–FCC 1–2	DTA–INA 5–1; Esquerdinho x2	FAB–MAM 0–3; WALKOVER	DCS–FCC 1–2	FHL–DBG 6–0; Mavó x2	DTA–INA 5–1	INT–SAG 1–0	FAB–MAM 0–3; WALKOVER	PHU–PET 0–1	PHU–PET 0–1	PRM–PRI 0–1	PRM–PRI 0–1	INT–SAG 1–0	_{4}20
12	15/5/88	2/6/88	15/5/88	14/5/88	14/5/88	5/6/88	14/5/88	2/6/88	15/5/88	15/5/88	15/5/88	15/5/88	5/6/88	14/5/88	_{8}22
12	DBG–MAM 2–0	INT–DCS 2–0	PHU–DTA 2–1	FCC–FAB 2–0	FCC–FAB 2–0	FHL–PRM 3–2	INA–SAG 2–0	INT–DCS 2–0; Jesus x2	DBG–MAM 2–0	PRI–PET 0–6; Saavedra 1' 26' 89'; Ndongala 41'; Abel 58' 83'	PHU–DTA 2–1	PRI–PET 0–6	FHL–PRM 3–2	INA–SAG 2–0	_{8}22
13	22/5/88	1/7/88	22/5/88	22/5/88	21/5/88	15/6/88	1/7/88	21/5/88	22/5/88	15/6/88	21/5/88	22/5/88	22/5/88	21/5/88	_{4}18
13	DBG–FAB 1–0	DCS–INA 2–0	DTA–PRI 0–1	DBG–FAB 1–0	FCC–INT 1–0; Adriano 90' pen.	PET–FHL 1–2; Ndisso 22'; Jaburú 62'	DCS–INA 2–0	FCC–INT 1–0	MAM–PRM 3–5	PET–FHL 1–2; Abel Campos 13'	SAG–PHU 1–1	DTA–PRI 0–1	MAM–PRM 3–5	SAG–PHU 1–1	_{4}18
14	3/7/88	7/7/88	3/7/88	2/7/88	7/7/88	3/7/88	7/7/88	2/7/88	3/7/88	3/7/88	7/7/88	2/7/88	3/7/88	2/7/88	_{3}17
14	PRM–DBG 1–2	DCS–PHU 2–0	DTA–FHL 1–1; Nando Saturnino '	INT–FAB 1–0	FCC–INA 1–1; Clara 77'	DTA–FHL 1–1	FCC–INA 1–1; Correia ' pen.	INT–FAB 1–0	MAM–PET 1–1	MAM–PET 1–1	DCS–PHU 2–0	SAG–PRI 3–2	PRM–DBG 1–2	SAG–PRI 3–2	_{3}17
15	10/7/88	9/7/88	10/7/88	10/7/88	10/7/88	9/7/88	9/7/88	9/7/88	10/7/88	10/7/88	10/7/88	9/7/88	10/7/88	9/7/88	_{7}9
15	DBG–PET 0–0	PRI–DCS 4–0	DTA–MAM 0–0	FAB–PRM 1–0	PHU–FCC 1–0	FHL–SAG 2–1; Mavó 5'; Ndisso 6'	INA–INT 0–0	INA–INT 0–0	DTA–MAM 0–0	DBG–PET 0–0	PHU–FCC 1–0	PRI–DCS 4–0; Mané 38'; Ndunguidi 62' 72'; Manuel Martins 78'	FAB–PRM 1–0	FHL–SAG 2–1; Man'Adão 80'	_{7}9
16	24/7/88	22/11/88	24/7/88	7/8/88	23/7/88	22/11/88	7/8/88	23/7/88	6/11/88	24/7/88	23/7/88	23/7/88	24/7/88	6/11/88	_{9}20
16	DBG–DTA 2–1	DCS–FHL 2–1; César ' Lolo '	DBG–DTA 2–1	INA–FAB 3–0	FCC–PRI 2–1; Adriano '	DCS–FHL 2–1; Ndisso '	INA–FAB 3–0	INT–PHU 2–0; Túbia 32'; Raúl 41'	MAM–SAG 1–0	PET–PRM 3–2; Jesus 64'; Teófilo 75'	INT–PHU 2–0	FCC–PRI 2–1	PET–PRM 3–2; Jorge '	MAM–SAG 1–0	_{9}20
17	13/8/88	14/8/88	14/9/88	14/9/88			25/9/88	17/8/88	14/8/88	14/9/88	25/9/88	17/8/88	14/9/88	13/8/88	
17	SAG–DBG 2–0	DCS–MAM 1–2	PRM–DTA 2–0	PET–FAB 4–2	FHL–FCC –	FHL–FCC –	PHU–INA 6–0	PRI–INT 0–0	DCS–MAM 1–2	PET–FAB 4–2; Balalau '	PHU–INA 6–0	PRI–INT 0–0	PRM–DTA 2–0	SAG–DBG 2–0; Abreu ' Rui Paulino '	
18	21/8/88	21/8/88	20/8/88	26/10/88	26/11/88	21/8/88	20/8/88	21/8/88	26/11/88	20/8/88	26/10/88	20/8/88	28/9/88	28/9/88	
18	DBG–DCS 0–0	DBG–DCS 0–0	DTA–PET 0–1	PHU–FAB 7–0	FCC–MAM –	INT–FHL 0–2; Carlitos 38'; Jaburú 78'	INA–PRI 1–2; Marques '	INT–FHL 0–2	FCC–MAM –	DTA–PET 0–1; Avelino '	PHU–FAB 7–0	INA–PRI 1–2; Nsuka 3'; Manuel 33' pen.	SAG–PRM 1–0	SAG–PRM 1–0; Rui Paulino '	
19	12/10/88	4/9/88	30/10/88	30/10/88	12/10/88	6/11/88	6/11/88	28/8/88	28/8/88	27/8/88	28/8/88	28/8/88	4/9/88	27/8/88	_{1}14
19	FCC–DBG 1–0	PRM–DCS 1–0	FAB–DTA 1–2	FAB–DTA 1–2	FCC–DBG 1–0; Jesus '	FHL–INA 2–2	FHL–INA 2–2	MAM–INT 0–2	MAM–INT 0–2	PET–SAG 1–0	PRI–PHU 1–1	PRI–PHU 1–1	PRM–DCS 1–0	PET–SAG 1–0	_{1}14
20	11/9/88	11/9/88	10/9/88	12/10/88	11/9/88	19/11/88	10/9/88	11/9/88	10/9/88	11/9/88	19/11/88	12/10/88	11/9/88	10/9/88	_{10}18
20	INT–DBG 2–1	DCS–PET 1–2	SAG–DTA 0–2	PRI–FAB 6–1; Renato '	PRM–FCC 0–0	PHU–FHL 0–1	INA–MAM 0–2	INT–DBG 2–1; Túbia '	INA–MAM 0–2; Maria ' Patrick '	DCS–PET 1–2	PHU–FHL 0–1	PRI–FAB 6–1; Degas x3 Manuel x2 Valentim '	PRM–FCC 0–0	SAG–DTA 0–2	_{10}18
21	18/9/88	17/9/88	17/9/88	18/12/88	17/9/88	19/10/88	18/9/88	18/9/88	18/9/88	17/9/88	18/9/88	19/10/88	18/9/88	18/12/88	
21	DBG–INA 0–1	DTA–DCS 3–1	DTA–DCS 3–1	FAB–SAG –	FCC–PET 0–0	FHL–PRI 2–1	DBG–INA 0–1	INT–PRM 0–1	MAM–PHU 2–0	FCC–PET 0–0	MAM–PHU 2–0	FHL–PRI 2–1	INT–PRM 0–1	FAB–SAG –	
22	9/10/88	14/12/88	8/10/88	9/10/88	8/10/88	9/10/88	19/11/88	9/10/88	8/10/88	9/10/88	9/10/88	8/10/88	19/11/88	14/12/88	
22	PHU–DBG 1–1	DCS–SAG –	FCC–DTA 1–1; Nando Saturnino '	FAB–FHL 0–2	FCC–DTA 1–1; Pedrito '	FAB–FHL 0–2	PRM–INA 4–1	INT–PET 0–7	PRI–MAM 2–2; Ângelo '	INT–PET 0–7; Jesus x3	PHU–DBG 1–1	PRI–MAM 2–2; Arsénio ' Barbosa '	PRM–INA 4–1	DCS–SAG –	
23	16/10/88	30/11/88	16/10/88	30/11/88	19/11/88	16/10/88	17/11/88	16/10/88	16/10/88	17/11/88	5/12/88	16/10/88	5/12/88	19/11/88	
23	DBG–PRI 1–1; Enoque '	DCS–FAB –	DTA–INT 1–0; Saúca 78'	DCS–FAB –	SAG–FCC 2–0	FHL–MAM 1–0; Ndisso '	PET–INA 8–0	DTA–INT 1–0	FHL–MAM 1–0	PET–INA 8–0	PHU–PRM 3–1	DBG–PRI 1–1; Cali '	PHU–PRM 3–1	SAG–FCC 2–0; Man'Adão x2	
24	23/10/88	22/10/88	22/10/88	23/10/88	22/10/88	23/10/88	22/10/88	16/11/88	23/10/88	23/10/88	23/10/88	22/10/88	22/10/88	16/11/88	_{2}21
24	DBG–FHL 2–5	FCC–DCS 1–1	INA–DTA 1–2; Coreano ' Nando Saturnino '	MAM–FAB 2–1	FCC–DCS 1–1	DBG–FHL 2–5	INA–DTA 1–2	SAG–INT 1–0	MAM–FAB 2–1	PET–PHU 0–1	PET–PHU 0–1	PRI–PRM 1–3	PRI–PRM 1–3	SAG–INT 1–0	_{2}21
25	27/11/88	8/1/89	21/11/88	14/12/88	14/12/88	26/11/88	27/11/88	8/1/89	27/11/88	26/11/88	21/11/88	26/11/88	26/11/88	27/11/88	
25	MAM–DBG –	DCS–INT 2–0	DTA–PHU 1–1; Armando '	FAB–FCC –	FAB–FCC –	PRM–FHL 1–0	SAG–INA –	DCS–INT 2–0	MAM–DBG –	PET–PRI 2–3; Avelino 25'; Luisinho '	DTA–PHU 1–1	PET–PRI 2–3; Amaral 10' ? Manuel Martins '	PRM–FHL 1–0; Zé Pedro '	SAG–INA –	
26	18/1/89	15/1/89	4/12/88	18/1/89	18/12/88	29/11/88	15/1/89	18/12/88	18/12/88	29/11/88	15/1/89	4/12/88	18/12/88	15/1/89	
26	FAB–DBG 0–3	INA–DCS 0–2	PRI–DTA 1–0	FAB–DBG 0–3	INT–FCC –	FHL–PET 3–2; Barbosa x2 Salvador 44' pen.	INA–DCS 0–2	INT–FCC –	PRM–MAM 1–1	FHL–PET 3–2; Saavedra x2	PHU–SAG 2–0	PRI–DTA 1–0	PRM–MAM 1–1	PHU–SAG 2–0	
T			_{8} 43							_{28} 62	_{2} 37	_{28} 51	_{6} 36		

=== Top scorer ===
- (Angola) Manuel Domingos Martins

== Champions ==
1988 Girabola winner
Atlético Petróleos de Luanda
5th title

Squad: Abel, Adinho, Antoninho, Avelino, Balalau, Barbosa, Jesus, Lúcio, Luisinho, Ndongala, Nejó, Paulão, Quim Sebas, Rasgado, Saavedra, Wilson
Head coach: Antônio Clemente
