= Girabola =

Top division of men's association football league in Angola

- Founded: 1979
- Country: Angola
- Confederation: CAF
- Number of clubs: 16
- Level on pyramid: 1
- Relegation to: Segundona
- Domestic cup(s): Taça de Angola; SuperTaça de Angola
- International cup(s): Champions League; Confederation Cup
- Current champions: Petro Atlético (20th title) (2025–26)
- Most championships: Petro Atlético (20 titles)
- Top scorer: (Angola) Love (135 goals)
- Website: girabola.com
- Current: 2026–27 Girabola

Girabola, or Campeonato Nacional de Futebol de Séniores Masculinos, is the top division of Angolan football. It is organized by the Angolan Football Federation.

The term "Girabola" (lit. 'spin ball') is a creation of the nationalist, radio broadcaster and sports reporter Rui Carvalho, in 1972, at a time when the Angolan championship was still officially called "Campeonato do Estado Ultramarino de Angola". The name "Girabola" differentiated the competition from the other overseas provinces and was a subtle form of anti-colonial protest.

In September 2025, ZAP through its sports network Z Sports regained exclusive rights to the league after five years.

The league winner and runner-up qualify for the CAF Champions League.

== History ==
The competition is the successor to the "Campeonato do Estado Ultramarino de Angola".

Between 1975 and 1979, this competition did not take place.

In 1979, the first post-independence year that the competition was played, the league consisted of 24 teams, divided into groups of four or six teams, in a competition that started on December 8, 1979.

In 1980, the competition was contested by the thirteen teams best classified in the previous season, plus Sagrada Esperança, benefiting from the division of the Lundas into north and south. The last edition to be played by fourteen teams was in 1990.

In 1991 and 1992, sixteen teams participated in the competition. In 1993 and 1994, the number of teams competing was reduced to twelve, because of the civil war that prevented teams from Huambo from participating in the competition.

In 1995 the competition was again contested by fourteen teams. Since that year, the point system has also changed, with the winner of the game earning 3 points instead of the 2 points previously earned.

Since 2010, the championship has been contested by 16 teams.

== Qualification for African competitions ==
=== Association ranking for the 2025–26 CAF club season ===
The association ranking for the 2025–26 CAF Champions League and the 2025–26 CAF Confederation Cup will be based on results from each CAF club competition from 2020–21 to the 2024–25 season.

Legend

- CL: CAF Champions League
- CC: CAF Confederation Cup
- ≥: Associations points might increase on basis of its clubs performance in 2024–25 CAF club competitions
- Associations ranked 1–12 are eligible to enter two teams in each CAF club competition.

Rank			Association	2020–21 (× 1)		2021–22 (× 2)		2022–23 (× 3)		2023–24 (× 4)		2024–25 (× 5)		Total
2025	2024	Mvt	Association	CL	CC	CL	CC	CL	CC	CL	CC	CL	CC	Total
1	1	—	Egypt	8	3	7	4	8	2.5	7	7	10	4	190.5
2	2	—	Morocco	4	6	9	5	8	2	2	4	5	5	142
3	4	+1	South Africa	8	2	5	4	4	3	4	1.5	9	3	131
4	3	-1	Algeria	6	5	7	1	6	5	2	3	5	5	130
5	6	+1	Tanzania	3	0.5	0	2	3	4	6	0	2	4	82.5
6	5	-1	Tunisia	4	3	5	1	4	2	6	1	3	0.5	82.5
7	8	+1	Angola	1	0	5	0	2	0	3	1.5	2	2	55
8	7	-1	DR Congo	4	0	0	3	1	2	4	0	2	0	45
9	9	—	Sudan	3	0	3	0	3	0	2	0	3	0	41
10	11	+1	Ivory Coast	0	0	0	1	0	3	3	0	1	2	38
11	10	-1	Libya	0	0.5	0	5	0	0.5	0	3	0	0	24
12	12	—	Nigeria	0	2	0	0	0	2	0	2	0	1	21

== List of champions before independence ==
The list of champions includes the national champions in the colonial period.

(Campeonato Provincial de Angola)

- 1941: Sporting de Luanda
- 1942: Sporting de Luanda
- 1943: Benfica de Benguela
- 1944: Sporting de Luanda
- 1945: Sport Clube da Catumbela
- 1946: Sporting de Luanda
- 1947: Sporting de Luanda
- 1948: unknown
- 1949: unknown
- 1950: unknown
- 1951: Ferroviário de Nova Lisboa
- 1952: Portugal de Benguela
- 1953: Ferroviário de Luanda
- 1954: Lobito SC
- 1955: Sporting de Luanda
- 1956: Sporting de Luanda
- 1957: Ferroviário de Nova Lisboa
- 1958: Sport Clube da Catumbela
- 1959: Portugal de Benguela
- 1960: Portugal de Benguela
- 1961: Portugal de Benguela
- 1962: Ferroviário de Luanda
- 1963: Sporting de Luanda
- 1964: Portugal de Benguela
- 1965: Atlético Sport Aviação
- 1966: Atlético Sport Aviação
- 1967: Atlético Sport Aviação
- 1968: Atlético Sport Aviação
- 1969: Independente Sport Clube
- 1970: Independente Sport Clube
- 1971: Independente Sport Clube
- 1972: Benfica de Nova Lisboa
- 1973: Futebol Clube do Moxico
- 1974: Ferroviário de Nova Lisboa
- 1975: Recreativo da Caála

Titles by team

P	Team	Won	Years won
1	Sporting de Luanda	8	1941, 1942, 1944, 1946, 1947, 1955, 1956, 1963
2	Portugal de Benguela	5	1952, 1959, 1960, 1961, 1964
3	Atlético Sport Aviação	4	1965, 1966, 1967, 1968
4	Ferroviário de Nova Lisboa	3	1951, 1957, 1974
4	Ind. de Porto Alexandre	3	1969, 1970, 1971
5	Ferroviário de Luanda	2	1953, 1962
5	Sport Clube da Catumbela	2	1945, 1958
6	Recreativo da Caála	1	1975
6	Futebol Clube do Moxico	1	1973
6	Benfica de Nova Lisboa	1	1972
6	Lobito SC	1	1954
6	Benfica de Benguela	1	1943

== Since independence (Girabola) ==
Year	Club	Coach	Ref.
1979	Primeiro de Agosto (1)	(Angola) Nicola Berardinelli	
1980	Primeiro de Agosto (2)	(Socialist Federal Republic of Yugoslavia) Ivan Ridanović	
1981	Primeiro de Agosto (3)	(Angola) Joaquim Dinis	
1982	Petro de Luanda (1)	(Brazil) Antônio Clemente	
1983	Primeiro de Maio (1)	(Socialist Federal Republic of Yugoslavia) Petar Knežević	
1984	Petro de Luanda (2)	(Angola) Severino Miranda	
1985	Primeiro de Maio (2)	(Mozambique) Rui Rodrigues	
1986	Petro de Luanda (3)	(Angola) Carlos Silva	
1987	Petro de Luanda (4)	(Brazil) Antônio Clemente	
1988	Petro de Luanda (5)	(Brazil) Antônio Clemente	
1989	Petro de Luanda (6)	(Angola) Carlos Queirós	
1990	Petro de Luanda (7)	(Angola) Carlos Queirós	
1991	Primeiro de Agosto (4)	(Serbia) Dušan Condić	
1992	Primeiro de Agosto (5)	(Serbia) Dušan Condić	
1993	Petro de Luanda (8)	(Serbia) Gojko Zec	
1994	Petro de Luanda (9)	(Serbia) Gojko Zec	
1995	Petro de Luanda (10)	(Angola) Jesus	
1996	Primeiro de Agosto (6)	(Angola) Mário Calado	
1997	Petro de Luanda (11)	(Brazil) Jorge Ferreira	
1998	Primeiro de Agosto (7)	(Angola) Daniel Ndunguidi	
1999	Primeiro de Agosto (8)	(Angola) Daniel Ndunguidi	
2000	Petro de Luanda (12)	(Brazil) Djalma Cavalcante	
2001	Petro de Luanda (13)	(Brazil) Djalma Cavalcante	
2002	ASA (1)	(Portugal) Bernardino Pedroto	
2003	ASA (2)	(Portugal) Bernardino Pedroto	
2004	ASA (3)	(Portugal) Bernardino Pedroto	
2005	Sagrada Esperança (1)	(Angola) Mário Calado	
2006	Primeiro de Agosto (9)	(Netherlands) Jan Brouwer	
2007	Interclube(1)	(Brazil) Carlos Mozer	
2008	Petro de Luanda (14)	(Portugal) Bernardino Pedroto	
2009	Petro de Luanda (15)	(Portugal) Bernardino Pedroto	
2010	Interclube (2)	(Portugal) Álvaro Magalhães	
2011	Recreativo do Libolo (1)	(Angola) Zeca Amaral	
2012	Recreativo do Libolo(2)	(Angola) Zeca Amaral	
2013	Kabuscorp (1)	(Bulgaria) Eduard Eranosyan	
2014	Recreativo do Libolo (3)	(Angola) Miller Gomes	
2015	Recreativo do Libolo(4)	(Portugal) João Paulo Costa	
2016	Primeiro de Agosto (10)	(Bosnia and Herzegovina) Dragan Jović	
2017	Primeiro de Agosto (11)	(Bosnia and Herzegovina) Dragan Jović	
2018	Primeiro de Agosto (12)	(Serbia) Zoran Manojlović	
2018–19	Primeiro de Agosto (13)	(Bosnia and Herzegovina) Dragan Jović	
2019–20	Cancelled (Note: Cancelled due to COVID-19 pandemic)		
2020–21	Sagrada Esperança(2)	(Angola) Roque Sapiri	
2021–22	Petro de Luanda (16)	(Portugal) Alexandre Santos	
2022–23	Petro de Luanda (17)	(Portugal) Alexandre Santos	
2023–24	Petro de Luanda (18)		
2024–25	Petro de Luanda (19)		
2025–26	Petro de Luanda (20)	(Angola) Flávio Amado	

== Titles by team ==
P	Team	Won	Years won
1	Petro de Luanda	20	1982, 1984, 1986, 1987, 1988, 1989, 1990, 1993, 1994, 1995, 1997, 2000, 2001, 2008, 2009, 2022, 2023, 2024, 2025, 2026
2	Primeiro de Agosto	13	1979, 1980, 1981, 1991, 1992, 1996, 1998, 1999, 2006, 2016, 2017, 2018, 2019
3	Recreativo do Libolo	4	2011, 2012, 2014, 2015
4	AS Aviação	3	2002, 2003, 2004
5	Primeiro de Maio	2	1983, 1985
5	Interclube	2	2007, 2010
5	Sagrada Esperança	2	2005, 2021
6	Kabuscorp	1	2013

== Top goalscorers ==
Ref:

Season	Player	Club	Goals
1979	(Angola) João Machado	Diabos Verdes	18
1980	(Angola) Alves	Primeiro de Agosto	29
1981	(Angola) Maluka	Primeiro de Maio	20
1982	(Angola) Jesus	Petro de Luanda	21
1983	(Angola) Maluka	Primeiro de Maio	17
1984	(Angola) Jesus	Petro de Luanda	22
1985	(Angola) Jesus	Petro de Luanda	19
1986	(Angola) Túbia Ribeiro	Inter Luanda	20
1987	(Angola) Mavó	Ferroviário da Huíla	20
1988	(Angola) Manuel	Primeiro de Agosto	16
1989	(Angola) André	Desportivo da Cuca	18
1990	(Angola) Mona	Petro de Luanda	17
1991	(Angola) Amaral Aleixo	Sagrada Esperança	23
1992	(Angola) Amaral Aleixo	Petro de Luanda	20
1993	(Angola) Serginho	Desportivo da EKA	14
1994	Kabongó	Sonangol do Namibe	16
1995	(Angola) Serginho	Desportivo da EKA	19
1996	(Angola) César Caná	Académica do Lobito	15
1997	(Angola) Zé Neli	Petro do Huambo	12
1998	(Angola) Betinho	Petro de Luanda	14
1999	(Angola) Isaac	Primeiro de Agosto	16
2000	(Democratic Republic of the Congo) Blanchard	Benfica de Luanda	19
2001	(Angola) Flávio Amado	Petro de Luanda	23
2002	(Angola) Flávio Amado	Petro de Luanda	16
2003	(Angola) Mateus André	Interclube	12
2004	(Angola) Love	ASA	17
2005	(Angola) Love	ASA	13
2006	(Angola) Manucho	Petro de Luanda	16
2007	(Angola) Manucho	Petro de Luanda	14
2008	(Angola) Santana Carlos	Petro de Luanda	20
2009	(Angola) David Magalhães	Petro de Luanda	19
2010	(Angola) Daniel Mpele Mpele	Kabuscorp	14
2011	(Angola) Love	Petro de Luanda	20
2012	(Angola) Yano	Progresso	14
2013	(Cameroon) Albert Meyong	Kabuscorp	20
2014	(Cameroon) Albert Meyong	Kabuscorp	17
2015	(Angola) Yano	Progresso	13
2016	(Angola) Gelson	Primeiro de Agosto	23
2017	(Brazil) Azulão	Petro de Luanda	16
2018	(Brazil) Azulão	Petro de Luanda	20
2018–19	(Angola) Mabululu	Primeiro de Agosto	14
2019–20	(Brazil) Tony Ribeiro	Petro de Luanda	15
2020–21	(Brazil) Azulão	Petro de Luanda	16
2021–22	(Brazil) Azulão	Petro de Luanda	21
2022–23	(Brazil) Azulão	Petro de Luanda	20
2023–24	(Angola) Benarfa	Kabuscorp	15
2024–25	(Angola) Kaporal	Wiliete de Benguela	22
2025–26	(Democratic Republic of the Congo) Dago Tshibamba	Primeiro de Agosto	18

Most times top goalscorer

- 5 times: (Brazil) Azulão (2017, 2018, 2020–21, 2021–22 and 2022–23.).

Most goals by a player in a single season

- 29 goals: (Angola) Alves (1980)

Most goals by a player in a single game

- 6 goals: Vieira Dias (Primeiro Agosto) 7–0 against Sassamba (1989)

=== All-time top goalscorers ===
Rank	Player	Goals	Years
1	(Angola) Love	135	2001–2017
2	(Brazil) Tiago Azulão	131	2016–present
3	(Angola) Jesus	111	1981–1988

== Multiple hat-tricks ==
Rank	Player	Hat-tricks
1	(Angola) Jesus	7
2	(Angola) Alves	5
2	(Brazil) Azulão	5
4	(Angola) Túbia Ribeiro	4
5	(Angola) Ndisso	3
5	(Angola) Love	3
5	(Angola) Vieira Dias	3
8	(Angola) Abel Campos	2
8	(Angola) Andre	2
8	(Angola) Bebeto	2
8	(Angola) David Magalhães	2
8	(Angola) Flávio Amado	2
8	(Angola) João Machado	2
8	(Angola) Julião	2
8	(Angola) Julinho	2
8	(Angola) Rasca	2
8	(Brazil) Rivaldo	2
8	(Angola) Santana Carlos	2
8	(Angola) Yano	2

Most hat-tricks in a single season

- 10 hat-tricks (2020-21)

Most hat-tricks by a player in a single season

- 3 hat-tricks:

(Angola) Jesus (1984)
(Angola) Túbia Ribeiro (1986)

== Rádio 5 Awards ==
Season	Best Player	Top Scorer	Best Goal-keeper	Best coach
2013	(Angola) Amaro	(Cameroon) Meyong	(Angola) Abulá	
2012	(Angola) Yano	(Angola) Yano	(Angola) Landu	(Angola) Zeca Amaral
2011	(Angola) Aguinaldo	(Angola) Love	(Angola) Hugo	(Angola) Zeca Amaral
2010	(Angola) Minguito	(Angola) Mpele Mpele		(Portugal) Álvaro Magalhães
2009	(Angola) Job	(Angola) David	(Angola) Ângelo	(Portugal) Bernardino Pedroto
2008	(Angola) Love	(Angola) Santana	(Angola) Capoco	(Portugal) Bernardino Pedroto
2007	(Angola) Minguito	(Angola) Manucho	(Angola) Mário	(Brazil) Carlos Mozer
2006	(Angola) Gazeta	(Angola) Manucho	(Angola) Lamá	(Netherlands) Jan Brouwer
2005	(Angola) Jamba	(Angola) Love		(Angola) Oliveira Gonçalves
2004	(Angola) Yamba Asha	(Angola) Love		
2003	(Angola) Love	(Angola) André		
2001	(Angola) Flávio	(Angola) Flávio	(Angola) Marito	(Brazil) Djalma Cavalcante
2000	(Angola) Mbiyavanga	(Angola) Blanchard		(Brazil) Djalma Cavalcante
1999	(Angola) Mendonça	(Angola) Isaac		(Angola) Ndunguidi

== See also ==
- List of Girabola seasons
- Girabola Clubs Participation Details
- Angola Cup
- Angola Super Cup
- Angola 2nd Division
