= S.L. Benfica (Luanda) =

Association football club in Angola

Benfica de Luanda
- Full name: Sport Luanda e Benfica
- Nickname: Águias de Luanda (Luanda Eagles)
- Founded: 5 October 1922; 103 years ago
- Ground: Estádio dos Coqueiros
- Capacity: 12,000
- Chairman: Joaquim Sebastião
- Manager: Zeca Amaral
- League: Girabola
- 2016: 6th
- Website: http://www.slbenfica.co.ao/
Home colours	Away colours

Sport Luanda e Benfica, commonly known as Benfica de Luanda, or simply as Benfica, is a football club from Luanda, Angola. The club was established as the Luanda affiliate of SL Benfica of Portugal, and shares the same colours. The logo is also very similar to the Portuguese one. The club, as of 2019, has never won the Girabola (the Angolan league first division).

The club is nicknamed Águias de Luanda, meaning "Luanda Eagles" (the eagle is the symbol of SL Benfica).

== History ==
The club was founded as Sport Luanda e Benfica and later renamed to Saneamento Rangol. In 2000, the club returned to its original name, Sport Luanda e Benfica.

In 1995, as Saneamento Rangol, the club was promoted to the following year's first division. In 2003, Benfica de Luanda was relegated to the second division. In 2004, the club finished second in the second division, and was promoted to the first division. In 2005, the club finished 6th in the first division.

== 2017 Girabola ==
On January 23, 2017, Benfica de Luanda issued a press release stating that it would not participate in the Girabola, citing financial reasons, and that the club would focus on its youth academy and in turning the club into a sports company. With such decision, the club is liable to a heavy penalty by the Angolan Federation that might include a suspension from the girabola for an established period.

=== Names ===
- 1922 : Founded as Sport Luanda e Benfica
- 19?? : Renamed Saneamento Rangol
- 2000 : Renamed Sport Luanda e Benfica

== League & Cup Positions ==
=== Domestic history ===
Season	Level	Pos	Pld	W	D	L	For	Against	Points	Domestic Cup	Top goalscorer
1999	1st	8	28	8	10	10	26	30	34		
2000	1st	8	26	11	2	13	36	45	35		
2001	1st	9	26	8	8	10	37	33	32		
2002	1st	8	26	8	8	10	23	27	32		
2003	1st	12	26	7	7	12	26	36	28		
2004	2nd	2									
2005	1st	5	26	10	7	9	19	13	37		
2006	1st	8	26	10	2	14	23	28	32	Runners-up	
2007	1st	10	26	9	8	9	22	21	35		
2008	1st	5	26	10	7	9	33	28	37		
2009	1st	3	26	14	5	7	42	32	47		
2010	1st	10	30	11	6	13	34	39	39		
2011	1st	13	30	9	8	13	33	36	35		
2012	1st	12	30	7	13	10	32	37	34		
2013	1st	10	30	7	14	9	29	30	35		
2014	1st	3	30	14	13	3	31	18	55	Champions	
2015	1st	3	30	14	11	5	35	23	53		Pedro – 11

=== Continental history ===
Season	Competition	Round	Opponent	Home	Away	Aggregate
2007	CAF Confederation Cup	1st Round	(Equatorial Guinea) San Pedro	2–0	5–1	7–1
2007	CAF Confederation Cup	Round of 16	(Cameroon) Astres	4–0	1–1	4–1^{1}
2007	CAF Confederation Cup	Round of 32	(Democratic Republic of the Congo) Motema Pembe	4–1	0–0	4–1
2015	CAF Confederation Cup	Preliminary round	(Burundi) Le Messager	2–0	1–0	3–0
2015	CAF Confederation Cup	First round	(Tunisia) Étoile du Sahel	1–1	0–1	1–2

^{1} Benfica were ejected from the competition for fielding an ineligible player.

== Honours ==
Angola Cup (1)
2014
Angola SuperCup (1)
2007

== Stadium ==
The club plays their home matches at the state-owned 12,000 capacity Estádio dos Coqueiros. However, work began in 2012 in the Luanda outskirts village of Cacuaco on the construction of their own stadium, with all the requirements for training and camp for their players. Sport Luanda e Benfica members believe that the club will become a role model in the near future.

== Manager history ==
Season	Coach	S	L	C	Coach	S	L	C	Coach	S	L	C
1994	(Angola) Zeca Amaral											
2000	(Argentina) Rúben Garcia											
2001	(Angola) Miller Gomes											
2002	(Angola) Miller Gomes											
2003	(Portugal) António Carlos				(Angola) Henriques Fernandes							
2004	(Angola) Kito Ribeiro											
2005	(Angola) Zeca Amaral											
2006	(Angola) Zeca Amaral											
2007	(Angola) Zeca Amaral											
2008	(Angola) Zeca Amaral											
2009	(Angola) Agostinho Tramagal				(Portugal) Jorge Plácido				(Angola) Joaquim Muyumba			
2010	(Angola) Mabi de Almeida				(Portugal) Jorge Plácido				(Angola) Joaquim Muyumba			
2011	(Portugal) Amaro Ferreira				(Brazil) Luís Mariano							
2012	(Angola) Humberto Chaves				(Angola) Abílio Amaral							
2013	(Angola) Abílio Amaral				(Angola) Romeu Filemón							
2014	(Angola) Zeca Amaral			2014 Angola Cup								
2015	(Angola) Zeca Amaral											
2016	(Angola) Zeca Amaral											

== See also ==
- Girabola
- Gira Angola
