= Angolan Provincial Football Stage =

- Country: Angola
- Confederation: CAF (Africa)
- Number of clubs: ? (2014-15)
- Level on pyramid: 3
- Promotion to: Gira Angola
- Relegation to: Angolan Fourth Division
- Domestic cup(s): Taça de Angola; SuperTaça de Angola
- Broadcaster(s): ?
- Website: girabola.com

Angola Provincial Stage (or Angolan Third Division) is the third division of Angolan football, and it is organized by the Angolan Football Federation.

Unlike most league systems worldwide, Angola does not have a regular second-tier league system. The teams that are relegated from the top-tier league, the Girabola, are relegated to the provincial championship from which they originate. The champion of each provincial championship automatically qualifies to the Segundona, the league or tournament that qualifies to the Girabola.

== Teams 2014-2015 ==
- Cabinda Sport Clube
- C.D. São Salvador
