= Atlético Petróleos do Huambo =

Angolan football club

Petro do Huambo
- Full name: Atlético Petróleos do Huambo
- Founded: 5 January 1980; 45 years ago
- Ground: Estádio dos Kuricutelas; Huambo, Angola
- Capacity: 17,000
- Chairman: Amilcar Kandimba
- Manager: n/a
- League: Gira Angola
- 2014: 4th (Série B)
Home colours

Atlético Petróleos do Huambo or simply Petro do Huambo is an Angolan football club based in Huambo. The club was established in 1980 as a result of a merger between Atlético de Nova Lisboa and Desportivo Sonangol. They are currently playing their home games at the Estádio Mártires da Canhala.

== Achievements ==
- Angolan League: 0
- Angolan Cup: 0
  - runner up 1982
- Angolan SuperCup: 0

== Performance in CAF competitions ==
- CAF Confederation Cup: 1 appearance

2004 – First Round

== Chairman history ==
- (Angola) Armando Machado
- (Angola) Armando Cangombe Periquito
- (Angola) Carlos Alberto Pires "Graça"
- (Angola) José Sobrinho
- (Angola) João da Reconciliação André (2012–2016)
- (Angola) Aníbal Salumbo (2016–present)

== Manager history and performance ==
Season	Coach	L2	L1	C	Coach	L2	L1	C
1981	(Angola) Eduardo Garcia				(Serbia) Zoran Dakić			
1982	(Angola) Arlindo Leitão							
1983	(Angola) João Machado							
1984	(Angola) Arlindo Leitão							
1985	(Angola) Arlindo Leitão							
1986	(Portugal) Nina Serrano							
1987	(Portugal) José Pérides							
1988	(Portugal) José Pérides				(Angola) Arlindo Leitão			
1989	(Angola) Arlindo Leitão				(Angola) Manuel de Almeida			
1991	(Portugal) Nina Serrano							
1992	(Portugal) Nina Serrano							
1993	(Portugal) Nina Serrano							
1994	(Portugal) Nina Serrano							
1995	(Portugal) Nina Serrano							
1996	(Portugal) Nina Serrano							
1998	(Angola) Mbuisso António							
2000	(Angola) Agostinho Tramagal							
2001	(Angola) Agostinho Tramagal							
2002	(Angola) Albano César							
2003	(Angola) Agostinho Tramagal							
2004	(Angola) Henriques Fernandes				(Angola) António Sayombo †			
2005	(Portugal) José Alberto Torres							
2006	(Angola) Alberto Cardeau							
2007	(Angola) Alberto Cardeau							
2008	(Angola) Alberto Cardeau				(Angola) Miller Gomes			
2013	(Angola) Nelito Constantino							

== See also ==
- Girabola
- Gira Angola
