= List of Progresso Associação do Sambizanga players =

This article a list of Progresso Associação do Sambizanga players. Progresso Associação do Sambizanga is an Angolan association football (soccer) club based in Luanda and plays at Estádio dos Coqueiros. The club was established in 1975.

== 2020–2021 ==
Progresso Associação do Sambizanga players 2020–2021

Nat	#	Nick	Name	A	P	H.T	Total Apps & Gls		
Nat	#	Nick	Name	A	P	2021	Total Apps & Gls		
Nat	#	Nick	Name	A	P	^{C}	^{S}	^{A}	^{G}
(Angola)	35	Alonso	Osvaldo Alonso		MF	2021			
(Angola)	23	Atanásio	Atanásio da Cruz Monteiro	24		2021			
(Angola)	12	Bagú	Daniel Pembele Adolfo	23	GK	2021			
(Angola)	22	Bito	Adalmiro Patrício Pacheco Silva	21	DF	2021			
(Angola)	21	Chiló	Francisco Ananias Orlando	31	MF	2021			
(Angola)	8	Chonene	João Augusto Afonso	27	DF	2021			
(Angola)	15	Dax	António Hilário Dembo Zage		MF	2021			
(Angola)	34	Djibril	Ernesto João Cezibe		DF	2021			
(Angola)	29	Edmilson	Edmilson Agostinho Ferreira			2021			
(Angola)	4	Felix				2021			
(Angola)	26	Filhão	João Gomes de Oliveira	26	FW	2021			
(Angola)	27	Fred	Frederico Xangonga Singongo		DF	2021			
(Angola)	11	Ginebe	Júlio Nzola Mpassa	26	MF	2021			
(Angola)	33	Isner	Isner Paulo João	23		2021			
(Angola)	15	Joãozinho	Carlos Alemão Sequeira	27	MF	2021			
(Angola)	31	Julinho	João Gabriel Miguel Diogo	22	FW	2021			
(Angola)	14	Kibeixa	Pedro Victor Mingas	28	MF	2021			
(Angola)	17	Kiloy	Junqueira Jacinto Dala	27	DF	2021			
(Angola)	13	Meda	Francisco Evaristo Franco Cachiquala	23	DF	2021			
(Angola)	16	Nelson	Nelson Francisco Manuel Lobo Antunes		GK	2021			
(Angola)	3	Patrick I	Patrício Paulo Alberto		DF	2021			
(Angola)	28	Pepe	Pedro Correia Alves	22	MF	2021			
(Angola)	5	Tande	Wanilson Tande Bala		DF	2021			
(Angola)	1	Tony	António Pedro Augusto	30	GK	2021			
(Angola)	35	Vadinho	Osvaldo André	25	MF	2021			
(Angola)	10	Vanilson	Vanilson Tita Zéu	22	MF	2021			
Years						2021			

== 2011–2020 ==
Progresso Associação do Sambizanga players 2011–2020

Nat	Nick	Name	A	P	J.B.	David Dias		L.A.	A.C.	A.C.	Kito Ribeiro			Hélder Teixeira						H. Teixeira			Total Apps & Gls			
Nat	Nick	Name	A	P	2011	2012	2013	2014	2015	2016	2017 (7th)			2018 (13th)			2018–19 (7th)			2019–20			Total Apps & Gls			
Nat	Nick	Name	A	P	12	8	9	10	12	8	^{#}	^{A}	^{G}	^{#}	^{A}	^{G}	^{#}	^{A}	^{G}	^{#}	^{A}	^{G}	^{S}	^{A}	^{G}	
(Angola)	Abegá	Manuel Pedro Pacavira	28	MF				→	4	→																
(Angola)	Abel Dora	Abel Mudilo Dora			2011																					
(Angola)	Abel Manfuila	Abel Makiade Manfuila	26	MF				→	2																	
(Angola)	Agugú	Agostinho Paciência	23	FW	2011																					
(Angola)	Além	Alberto Adão Campos Miguel	21	MF							→			5	^{24(3)}	^{0}	→									
(Angola)	Almeida Fernando	José Xavier Fernando	24	MF						8	8	^{25}	^{1}	→												
(Angola)	Álvaro Silva	Álvaro Massuama da Silva	24	DF													20	^{5(3)}	^{0}	20	^{13}	^{0}				
(Angola)	Amâncio	Amâncio José Pinto Fortes	24	MF	→	2012		20																		
(Angola)	Anastácio Costa	Anastácio Manuel da Costa	32	DF					→	26																
(Angola)	Atanásio	Atanásio da Cruz Monteiro	–														23	^{(6)}	^{0}							
(Angola)	Avex	Avelino Eduardo António Craque	32	MF					20	20																
(Angola)	Ayson	Arilson de Ceita Pereira Jorge	19	MF										26	^{DNP}		26	^{6(4)}	^{0}	→						
(Angola)	Baby	Valdemar Denso António	26	MF										18	^{8}	^{1}	→									
(Angola)	Badrick	Badrick Paulo Madadi	28	GK						→	1	^{3}	^{0}	→												
(Angola)	Bagú	Daniel Pembele Adolfo	–	GK										16	^{DNP}											
(Angola)	Balacai	Evaristo Maurício Pascoal	23	MF							→			7	^{23(1)}	^{2}	→									
(Angola)	Bandukissi	Bandukissi André		MF													–	^{DNP}		–						
(Angola)	Belito			MF						26	→															
(Angola)	Benarfa	Mankoka Hegene Afonso	19	FW										4	^{(1)}	^{0}	18	^{3(16)}	^{5}	18	^{4}	^{1}				→
(Angola)	Benvindo Regresso	Benvindo Regresso Pontes Garcia	30	MF					→	30																
(Angola)	Beny	Júlio Pacavira da Costa	19	GK										1	^{2}	^{0}	–	^{DNP}								
(Angola)	Bito Silva	Adalmiro Patrício Pacheco Silva		DF																22	^{15}	^{0}				
(Democratic Republic of the Congo)	Bombasa	Bombasa Victor		GK				→	1	1	→															
(Democratic Republic of the Congo)	Botayi	Pierre Botayi	20	MF			–																			
(Angola)	Bráulio	Bráulio Jorge Manuel												→			32	^{DNP}		32	^{DNP}					
(Angola)	Brazuca	Walter Inácio Furtado Vieira	28	MF	2011	2012	24	24	28	28	→															
(Angola)	Breco	Pedro dos Santos António	30	MF				→	–																	
(Angola)	Bruno Batista	Bruno Miguel Francisco Batista	25	FW						→	26	^{6(6)}	^{1}	→												
(Angola)	Buchinho	Joffre Joaquim Faztudo	25	DF						4	4	^{10(1)}	^{0}	4	^{9}	^{0}										
(Angola)	Bug Jass	Simão da Costa Bartolomeu	28	MF							→			14	^{7(4)}	^{0}	14	^{17(3)}	^{1}	→						
(Angola)	Cabibi Ramos	Leonardo Manuel Isola Ramos	25	MF							24	^{4(3)}	^{0}	→												
(Angola)	Cali	Carlos Eduardo Bequete		MF	2011	2012																				
(Cape Verde)	Calú	Carlos Alberto Silva Lima	31	DF		2012	10	10																		
(Angola)	Capuco	Emanuel José Paulo João	27	MF		→	28																			
(Angola)	Celso	Guilherme Francisco Saiendo Cabuço	25	MF					–	14	10	^{10(6)}	^{0}	10	^{17(2)}	^{1}	10	^{25}	^{2}	10	^{22}	^{3}				→
(Angola)	Celson Barros	Celso João Barros Costa	26	DF	→	2012	→																			
(Angola)	Chabalala	Gaspar Necas Fortunato	18	FW						→	23	^{(3)}	^{0}	→												
(Angola)	Chada	Kalonge Lenga						→	16																	
(Angola)	Chapim	Gilberto Chapim		MF			–																			
(Angola)	Chico Bel		24	MF			6																			
(Angola)	Chico Bunga	Carlos Francisco Diassonama Panzo Bunga	22	MF		2012	11																			
(Angola)	Chiló	Francisco Ananias Orlando	30	MF										21	^{8(4)}	^{4}	21	^{26(2)}	^{7}	21	^{20(1)}	^{2}				
(Angola)	Chipa			DF		2012	→																			
(Angola)	Chonene	João Augusto Afonso	26	DF													8	^{14}	^{0}	8	^{16}	^{0}				
(Angola)	Chora Ginga	Fernando Quitanda Ginga	29	DF				→	6	6																
(Angola)	Coelhinho	Walter Inácio L. Gouveia	22	DF										→			4	^{7(1)}	^{0}	→						
(Angola)	Coio	Sebastião António Coio	22	GK													→			12	^{9}	^{0}				
(Angola)	Cuca	José Semedo Vunge	22	MF						15	15	^{1(1)}	^{0}	8	^{7(3)}	^{0}										
(Cape Verde)	Dany Ribeiro	Daniel Mendes Ribeiro	26				→	–																		
(Angola)	David Magalhães	David Dinis Magalhães	34	FW						30	→															
(Angola)	Delgado	Luís Manuel Ferreira Delgado	32	DF	2011																					
(Cape Verde)	Delmiro	Delmiro Évora Nascimento	26	DF				19																		
(Democratic Republic of the Congo)	Didí Shiya	Didi Mukala Muana Shiya		GK					30																	
(Angola)	Dinho	Carlos Alberto Ventura		DF				–	→																	
(Angola)	Dione	Diogo Serafim Pedro	33	MF	2011	2012	20																			
(Angola)	Djibril			DF																34	^{3(1)}	^{0}				
(Namibia)	Djo Jantse	Johannes Gabriel Dumisa Jantse	28	MF	2011	→																				
(Cape Verde)	Duba	Steevan Humberto Fortes dos Santos	25	FW			→	16	→																	
(Cameroon)	Edgard	Edgard Arnaud Afane	26	MF										8	^{5(2)}	^{0}	8	^{5(5)}	^{0}							
(Angola)	Edi	Edivaldo Prazeres Manuel Valentim	24	DF				→	–																	
(Angola)	Eliseu Calei	Eliseu Manuel Calei	23	DF						22	22	^{10(2)}	^{0}	22	^{19}	^{0}	22	^{14}	^{0}							
(Democratic Republic of the Congo)	Eric Bokanga	Eric Bokanga Musau	29	FW					–					20	^{6(1)}	^{1}										
(Angola)	Estória	Sérgio António Luís					28	–	–																	
(Angola)	Felix																			4	^{DNP}					
(Guinea-Bissau)	Fernandes, João	João Nunes Fernandes	29	FW	2011																					
(Angola)	Filhão	João Gomes de Oliveira	25	FW													→			26	^{5(8)}	^{1}				
(Angola)	Fofó	Afonso Sebastião Cabungula	23	MF						→	18	^{21(2)}	^{10}	→												
(Angola)	Freddy	Frederico Xangonga Singongo		DF																27	^{DNP}					
(Angola)	Fundo †	Fundo Martins Mikule	23	FW							→			19	^{4(5)}	^{1}										
(Angola)	Fuxito	Afonso Ramilde Sampaio Henriques	30	FW	2011																					
(Angola)	Gaca	João Sebastião Figueira Gaca	26	MF							20	^{6(1)}	^{0}	15	^{2(2)}	^{0}	→									
(Angola)	Geovany					2012																				
(Cameroon)	Gérard	Gérard Bakinde Bilong	25	MF				→	5	5	→															
(Angola)	Ginebe	Júlio		MF													11	^{1(9)}	^{0}	11	^{8(6)}	^{2}				
(Angola)	Gogoró	João Ngunza Muanha	25	MF																9	^{2(4)}	^{0}				→
(Angola)	Grau	Diogo José Mateus Pascoal	30	DF	2011	→																				
(Angola)	Gria	Samuel Gria	20	MF		2012	29																			
(Angola)	Gui Cungulo	Eufrânio Carlos da Silva Cungulo	23	MF										→			5	^{7(3)}	^{0}							
(Angola)	Gui Tomás	Dialanda Bernanguindoco Tomás		FW													27	^{2(1)}	^{1}	7	^{14(2)}	^{0}				→
(Angola)	Hélio Roque	Hélio José Lopes Roque	30	FW				8	–																	
(Zambia)	Harry Milanzi	Harry Milanzi	33	FW	2011																					
(Zambia)	Ian Bakala	Ian Bakala	32	FW		2012																				
(Angola)	Isaac Costa	Isaac Correia da Costa	21	DF	2011	2012	→																			
(Angola)	Isner	Isner Paulo João	22																	33	^{1(4)}	^{0}				
(Angola)	Ito	Mário Manuel de Oliveira	21	MF		2012	33	33	8	→																
(Poland)	Jacek	Jacek Magdziński	30	FW						17																
(Angola)	Jaime Linares	Jaime Miguel Linares	33	DF	2011	2012	22	22	22	→																
(Angola)	Jairzinho	Jair Sebastião de Castro	24	MF		2012	8	8																		
(Angola)	Jesus																17	^{DNP}								
(Angola)	Jó Vidal	Mariano da Costa Vidal	24	DF										→			30	^{29(1)}	^{0}	→						
(Angola)	Joãozinho Sequeira	Carlos Alemão Sequeira		MF			16	23	23	29	→						15	^{8(7)}	^{0}	15	^{4(6)}	^{0}				
(Angola)	Joaquim Adão	Joaquim Adão Lungieki João	22	MF				6	→																	
(Cameroon)	Jonathan	Joseph Jonathan Ngwem	26	DF						20	20	^{3}	^{0}													
(Angola)	Josemar Monteiro	Josemar Baião Monteiro	22	DF							→			27	^{13(1)}	^{1}										
(Angola)	Josemar Tomás	Jorge de Carvalho Tomás		GK	2011	2012																				
(Angola)	Julinho			FW													31	^{(1)}	^{0}	31	^{3(9)}	^{0}				
(Angola)	Júnior			GK													1	^{2}	^{0}							
(Angola)	Kibeixa	Pedro Victor Mingas	27	MF						→	30	^{(2)}	^{0}	→			→			14	^{9(7)}	^{5}				
(Angola)	Kikas Quitumba	Joelson José Domingos Quitumba	25					→	10	→																
(Angola)	Kiko					2012																				
(Angola)	Kiloy	Junqueira Jacinto Dala	26	DF													→			17	^{4(2)}	^{0}				
(Angola)	Kivuvu	Kisoka Jeadot Kivuvu	28	DF					2	→																
(Angola)	Lagos	Lagos Francisco Mendes kitenda	30	DF	2011	2012																				
(Angola)	Lambito Carlos	Osvaldo Vasco Carlos	25	GK			30	30																		
(Cameroon)	Landry	Landry Tchatchet Ntakeu	26	FW							→			20	^{(3)}	^{0}	–	^{DNP}								
(Angola)	Lara Domingos	Manuel Jacinto Domingos	28	DF							→			28	^{25}	^{1}	28	^{31}	^{0}	→						
(Angola)	Laúcha	Ivan Cláudio França Joanes	26		2011	→																				
(Angola)	Laurentino	Laurentino Gerónimo Fernandes da Cruz	35	GK	→	2012																				
(Angola)	Lawrence	Lawrence Phiri	29	DF	2011	2012	21	21	21	21																
(Democratic Republic of the Congo)	Lelo Mayimona	Patrick Lelo Mayimona	27	DF			3																			
(Angola)	Liliano Pedro	Liliano Pedro	22	FW													7	^{11(3)}	^{2}	→						
(Angola)	Lito					2012																				
(Angola)	Lopes Simão	Lopes Mateus Simão	26	DF	2011	2012	4	4	→																	
(Brazil)	Luciano Câmara	Luciano Carlos Marques Câmara	24	FW	2011	2012																				
(Angola)	Luís Sousa	Luís Paulino de Sousa		FW	2011	2012	7	7	7	7	7	^{1(6)}	^{0}													
(Angola)	Luís Tati	Luís Bumba Tati	24	FW					→	10	→															
(Angola)	Lunguinha	António Luís dos Santos Serrado	29	DF					→	13	13	^{20}	^{0}	→												
(Angola)	Mano Calesso	Luís Calesso Ginga	25	MF	2011		18	18	→																	
(Angola)	Manucho Barros	João Hernâni Rosa Barros	29	FW			→	3	24																	
(Angola)	Maquemba	Eldon Martins Maquemba	29	FW			31																			
(Angola)	Maria Pia	Victorino Guilherme Tchyonga	30	MF							→			29	^{13(3)}	^{0}	29	^{29(3)}	^{3}	→						
(Cape Verde)	Mário Costa	Mário Eugênio Fernandes da Costa	26	DF		2012	5	→																		
(Angola)	Massinga	Moisés Armando Yango	28	FW		→	23	→	14	→																
(Angola)	Mavambu	Mavambu João Afonso Baptista	22	MF							→			11	^{3(5)}	^{0}										
(Angola)	Meda Cachiquala	Francisco Evaristo Franco Cachiquala	22	DF										13	^{6}	^{0}	13	^{5(2)}	^{0}	5	^{14(1)}	^{0}				
(Angola)	Meda Nsiandamba	Vidal Miguel Paulo Nsiandamba	28	FW													→			13	^{6(2)}	^{0}				
(Angola)	Megue Miguel	Pedro Pessoa Miguel	23	MF						6	6	^{3(3)}	^{0}	6	^{15(10)}	^{0}	6	^{11(1)}	^{3}	→						
(Angola)	Mena	Daniel Mena Kuanzambi		GK	2011	→																				
(Angola)	Messias Neves	Messias Pires Neves	28	MF													→			6	^{22}	^{0}				→
(Angola)	Micki Gama	Miguel Cipriano da Gama	31	DF	2011	2012	19																			
(Angola)	Miguel Do	Miguel Kamba Do	22	FW					–																	
(Angola)	Miguel Quiame	Miguel Geraldo Quiame	27	DF										19	^{2}	^{0}										
(Democratic Republic of the Congo)	Milambo Mutamba	Albert Milambo-Mutamba	31	MF				5	26	→																
(Angola)	Moco	Bruno Baptista Tolombua Fernando	29	FW													→			19	^{12}	^{2}				→
(Angola)	Moreno, Rúben	Rúben Paulo Moreno	27		2011																					
(Democratic Republic of the Congo)	Mufuku	Mufuku Babi	26	FW				→	19																	
(Angola)	Nandinho Macamo	Wilson Fernandes Augusto Macamo	29	MF		→	27	14	→																	
(Angola)	Nandinho Quissanga	Fernando Jacinto Quissanga	22	DF										25	^{27}	^{2}	25	^{22}	^{1}	25	^{20(1)}	^{1}				→
(Angola)	Ndieu	Ndieu Doune António Massadila	28	DF					→	2	2	^{17(1)}	^{1}	→												
(Angola)	Nelson Antunes	Nelson Francisco Manuel Lobo Antunes		GK										→			16	^{20}	^{0}	16	^{16}	^{0}				
(Angola)	Norberto Emous	Kiatalua Tadeu Emous	23	MF		2012				→	14	^{8(7)}	^{2}	→												
(Angola)	Nuno Cadete	Gerson Agostinho Sebastião Cadete	35	GK										23	^{2}	^{0}										
(Angola)	Nuno Neto	Nuno Miguel de Menezes Neto	33	DF					16	18	→															
(Cameroon)	Nyamé	Hugo Patrick Nyamé	31	GK					→	16	16	^{14}	^{0}													
(Democratic Republic of the Congo)	Nyemba	Eric Nyemba Tuboko	27	FW					17																	
(Angola)	Nzau	Nzau Miguel Lutumba	29	DF						3	3	^{22}	^{0}	→			→			4	^{10}	^{0}				
(Angola)	Olívio	Olívio Mendonça Luciano		DF		2012																				
(Angola)	Ossiki	Ricardo João da Silva	23	DF						→	29	^{2}	^{0}													
(Angola)	Patrick Alberto	Patricio Paulo Alberto		DF				27						→			2	^{DNP}		2	^{9}	^{0}				
(Democratic Republic of the Congo)	Patrick Anfumu	Patrick Lembo Anfumu	32	FW						→	25	^{3(8)}	^{3}	18	^{DNP}											
(Angola)	Patrick Ferreira	Patrick de Sousa Ferreira		FW										→			24	^{1}	^{0}							
(Angola)	Paz	Manuel Nhanga Zundo	27	MF		→	26	13	→																	
(Angola)	Pedro Agostinho	Pedro Domingos Agostinho	20	MF													→			24	^{5(2)}	^{0}				
(Angola)	Pedy	Benedito C. Dumbo		FW													22	^{12(4)}	^{2}	→						
(Angola)	Pepe Alves	Pedro Correia Alves	–	MF						32										28	^{1}	^{1}				
(Angola)	Pilolas	José Olívio Andrade Pereira	29	FW			→	–																		
(Angola)	Pingo	Mateus João Francisco Bravo	30	DF			→	2	13	⋅	→															
(Angola)	Popó	Paulino Gomes Nguendelamba	20	FW						31				24	^{2(7)}	^{2}	→									
(Angola)	René Baltazar	Kalemba René Baltazar	24	DF						→	5	^{14(1)}	^{0}	→												
(Angola)	Richy	Pedro Lundoloki		MF				→	27																	
(Angola)	Roger Brito	António Bernardo Feliciano Gomes de Brito	31	MF	2011	2012																				
(Cameroon)	Romi	Jean-Charles Ndjom Kouang	28	MF	2011																					
(Angola)	Ruben	Rúben de Sousa Nathis	30	FW	→	2012	→																			
(Zimbabwe)	Rusike	Tafadzwa Paul Rusike	26	MF				→	18	→																
(Democratic Republic of the Congo)	Saki	Saki Ndaka Amisi (Note: Amisi was suspended for 2 years due to citizenship fraud)	29	DF				→	–																	
(Angola)	Sanches	Paulo Sanches Octávio			2011																					
(Angola)	Sawú	Sawu Diamanza Garcia Simão	29	FW			32																			
(Togo)	Serge	Seko Atsou Serge	24	MF						→	28	^{16}	^{1}													
(Angola)	Silva Anato	António da Silva Anato	23	MF					→	11	11	^{19(2)}	^{3}	→												
(Zambia)	Sipho	Sipho Mumbi	32		2011																					
(Angola)	Sténio	Sténio de Sá Miranda Simão									→			30	^{1(4)}	^{1}				30	^{7}	^{0}				→
(Angola)	Stopirrá	Edgar Jerónimo	33	MF	2011																					
(Angola)	Tande	Wanilson Tande Bala		DF										3	^{9}	^{0}	3	^{1}	^{0}	3	^{1}	^{0}				
(Angola)	Tino Cassinda	Celestino Calueio Cassinda	19	FW					–	19																
(Angola)	Tití	Luís Vicente Arão	24	GK		2012	→	12	12	12	12	^{9}	^{0}	12	^{24}	^{0}	12	^{10}	^{0}							
(Angola)	Tony Augusto	António Pedro Augusto	–	GK																1	^{DNP}					
(Angola)	Totó Candeia	Osvaldo Cornélio Paulo Candeia	32	MF				→	25	25																
(Democratic Republic of the Congo)	Tshibuabua	Bavon Tshibuabua	26	FW						→	21	^{1(7)}	^{0}													
(Democratic Republic of the Congo)	Tusilu	Tusilu Bazola	27	MF						18																
(Angola)	Vá	Vladimiro Edson António Félix	19	FW						17	17	^{17}	^{4}	→												
(Angola)	Vadinho																			35	^{(2)}	^{0}				
(Angola)	Vado					2012																				
(Cape Verde)	Vally	Valdevindes Chantres Monteiro	24	DF		2012																				
(Angola)	Vanilson	Vanilson Tita Zéu	–	MF																23	^{(1)}	^{0}				
(Angola)	Viet	Inácio Maulitano Cassuque	25	MF	→	2012	25	25	23	23	→															
(Cape Verde)	Vozinha	Josimar José Évora Dias	28	GK		2012	1	1																		
(Angola)	Wilson Gonçalves	Wilson Monteiro Gaio Gonçalves	29	FW	→	2012	→																			
(Angola)	Yano Nicolau	Adriano Belmiro Duarte Nicolau	27	FW	2011	2012	9	9	9	9	9	^{21(1)}	^{5}	9	^{19(2)}	^{8}	9	^{27(2)}	^{8}	→						
(Republic of the Congo)	Yapo			FW										11	^{6(1)}	^{1}										
(Angola)	Yuri Dala	Yuri Mabi Dala	30	DF		2012	2																			
(Angola)	Zezão †	José Francisco Gomes	22	MF				→	15	→																
(Angola)	Zico																19	^{(1)}	^{0}							
(Angola)	Zinho					2012																				
Years					2011	2012	2013	2014	2015	2016	2017			2018		26	2018–19		35	2019–20		18				

== 2001–2010 ==
Progresso Associação do Sambizanga players 2001–2010

Nat	Nick	Name	A	P	N.Brandão		JAT	J.I.	J.F.	L.M.	J.M.	E.C.	J.I.	D.S.	
Nat	Nick	Name	A	P	2001	2002	2003	2004	2005	2006	DNE	2008	2009	2010	
Nat	Nick	Name	A	P	12	1	8	11	10	13	–	3	3	1	
(Angola)	Abegá			MF								2008			
(Angola)	Agugú	Agostinho Paciência	–	FW									→	2010	↑
(Angola)	Aílton	Sebastião Patrício Micolo							10	2006					
(Angola)	Ângelo			GK					–						
(Angola)	Barros			DF								2008			
(Angola)	Bendinha			DF				2004							
(Angola)	Bernardo									2006					
(Angola)	Big Jace			MF			2003	2004							
(Angola)	Bocandé	Carlos Bernardo Fuma											2009		
(Angola)	Borra			MF									2009		
(Angola)	Bravo da Rosa	Paulo Bravo da Rosa									→	2008			
(Angola)	Cacharamba	Manuel Pascoal Cacharamba Júnior	31	MF			2003	2004							
(Angola)	Cali	Carlos Bequete		MF								2008	2009		
(Angola)	Calucho								19						
(Angola)	Capeleco	Domingos Fernando Américo		FW				2004		2006	→				
(Angola)	Cariata	Bernardo Mário Faustino Cariata								2006					
(Angola)	Chiao										2007				
(Angola)	Chico			FW								2008			
(Angola)	Couto								13	2006					
(Angola)	Dadão Domingos	Osvaldo Marinho Domingos	25	MF							2007	2008	→		
(Angola)	Dadão II											2008			
(Angola)	Dani										2007	2008			
(Angola)	Dedas	Benjamim Francisco de Oliveira	24	DF					→	2006	→				
(Angola)	Dedé			MF							2007	2008	2009	2010	
(Angola)	Deodato			DF			2003								
(Angola)	Diangani	Mateus Diangani		DF					23	2006	→				
(Angola)	Didí			MF			2003								
(Angola)	Dione	Diogo Serafim Pedro	–	MF								→	2009		↑
(Angola)	Dominguês	Domingos Domingues António									2007				
(São Tomé and Príncipe)	Ducher			FW					–						
(Angola)	Edson Cata	Edson Filipe Santana Cata								2006					
(Angola)	Filó												2009		
(Angola)	Gil								–						
(Angola)	Heidinho †	Heidi Jorge de Oliveira	26	DF			2003	2004			→	2008			
(Cape Verde)	Hugo Évora	Hugo Miguel Magalhães Évora	28	DF									2009		
(Zambia)	Ian Bakala	Ian Bakala	–	FW										2010	↑
(Angola)	Jamaica												2009		
(Angola)	Joãozinho											2008			
(Angola)	Josemar Tomás	Jorge de Carvalho Tomás		GK								→	2009		
(Democratic Republic of the Congo)	Kalusha †	Manianga Banza	27						19	→					
(Angola)	Kilaudio	Kilaudio Dilanguelo Samuel	20				2003	2004							
(Angola)	Lami, P	Paulo Monteiro Lami							→	2006	2007	→			
(Angola)	Lima	Álvaro de Jesus Alexandre Lima								2006					
(Angola)	Lito Hamuti	Paulino Tiago Hamuti		DF					–						
(Angola)	Loló Santana	João Cláudio G. Santana								2006					
(Angola)	Lopes Simão	Lopes Mateus Simão	–	DF									2009		↑
(Angola)	Lucas Simão	Lucas Orlando Sabino Simão								2006					
(Brazil)	Luís XV	Luiz Américo Buosi Júnior		GK						2006					
(Angola)	Luís Sousa	Luís Paulino de Sousa		FW					31		2007		2009		
(Angola)	Macambé						→	2004							
(Angola)	Man Báia	Marcolino João Gonçalves Santana		DF			2003	2004	26	2006	→				
(Angola)	Maninho Matias	António Pascoal Matias	26	DF		→	2003	2004	→						
(Angola)	Manucho Barros	João Hernani Rosa Barros	20	FW						2006	→				
(Angola)	Marco Aurélio			DF							2007				
(Angola)	Marcos												2009		
(Angola)	Marito João	Mário André Rodrigues João	28	GK					1						
(Angola)	Master	José Pascoal Vidal		GK			2003	2004	→	2006					
(Angola)	Mauro Gomes	Manuel Lourenço Gomes		FW									2009		
(Angola)	Mbinda	Afonso Lando da Silva Zilungo											2009		
(Angola)	Mendes Ginga	Mário Olegário Pascoal Ginga	26	MF			2003	2004	6	2006	→				
(Angola)	Micki Gama	Miguel Cipriano da Gama	–	FW								2008			↑
(Zambia)	Milanzi	Harry Milanzi	–	FW										2010	↑
(Angola)	Milex													2010	
(Angola)	Mingo Ngola	Osvaldo António Ngunza Ngola	26	MF			2003	2004	–						
(Angola)	Minguito												2009		
(Angola)	Miranda Carlos	António Miranda Carlos	27	DF				2004	3	2006					
(Angola)	Mizinho									2006					
(Democratic Republic of the Congo)	Muamba	Muamba Mukala Patou		DF					14	2006					
(Angola)	Nando Mundele	Nguizani Pedro Sebastião Mundele		DF							2007				
(Angola)	Ndulo Cachindele	Francisco Ndulo Cachindele		GK								2008			
(Angola)	Nelo			MF				2004							
(Angola)	Nelo II							2004							
(Angola)	Nelson			FW			2003								
(Angola)	Neridson †	Neridson Tavares Estevão	26	MF					23	2006		2008	2009		
(Angola)	Neruda	Stélvio de Assis Vieira de Olim		FW			→	2004							
(Angola)	Netinho	Sebastião Egídio Mateus		MF							2007	→			
(Angola)	Nito								21						
(Angola)	Nsuka Sapato	Domingos Celestino Sapato		DF								2008	→		
(Angola)	Nuno						→	2004							
(Angola)	Nzuzi Ngemba			GK			2003								
(Angola)	Paito Kamutali	António Katiavala Kamutali	26	MF			2003	2004	18	2006	2007	2008	→		
(Democratic Republic of the Congo)	Paris	Nzuzi Ngamba		GK				2004							
(Angola)	Paulo			GK							2007				
(Angola)	Paulo Bento								30		2007				
(Angola)	Pedrinha			DF								2008			
(Angola)	Pedro Henriques	Pedro Manuel Henriques Dias	22	FW			2003		9						
(Angola)	Pingo	Mateus João Francisco Bravo	23	DF							2007	2008	→		
(Angola)	Pinto											2008			
(Angola)	Rasca	Maieco Domingos Henrique António		FW			→	2004	→						
(Brazil)	Ronaldo	Ronaldo das Neves Falitas								2006					
(Angola)	Sanches	Paulo Sanches Octávio		DF									2009		
(Zambia)	Sipho	Sipho Mumbi											2009		
(Angola)	Stanick	Caetano Manuel Domingos							–						
(Angola)	Stopirrá	Edgar Jerónimo	–	MF										2010	↑
(Brazil)	Tiago Leite	Tiago Martins Leite	23	FW						2006					
(Angola)	Tinto	Rufino da Silva Domingos		DF			2003	2004	→						
(Angola)	Tití	Luís Vicente Arão		GK								2008	2009		
(Angola)	Vadinho Campos	Hamlet Divalde Sousa Campos	21	DF						2006	→				
(Angola)	Vado Ferreira	Jaime Walter de Jesus Tavares Ferreira		DF					16	2006		2008	→		
(Angola)	Zacarias			DF			2003			2006					
(Angola)	Zé Augusto Gomes	José Augusto de Oliveira e Gomes	20	MF			2003	→							
(Angola)	Zé da Barra			GK					35	2006					
(Angola)	Zé Gomes	José Gomes		DF			2003			2006					
(Brazil)	Zé Luís Sousa	José Luís Birche de Souza	25							2006					
(Angola)	Zico Francisco	Fernando Domingos Francisco	31	MF			2003	2004							
Years					2001	2002	2003	2004	2005	2006	2007	2008	2009	2010	

== 1991–2000 ==
Progresso Associação do Sambizanga players 1991–2000

Nat	Nick	Name	A	P			A.L.			Joaq. Dinis		A.G.		
Nat	Nick	Name	A	P	1991	1992	1993	1994	1995	1996	1997	1998	1999	2000
Nat	Nick	Name	A	P	–	–	–	–	–	–	–	–	–	–
(Angola)	Abel										1997			
(Angola)	Adérito					1992	1993							
(Angola)	Afonso					1992	1993							
(Angola)	Altino					1992	1993							
(Angola)	Arlindo										1997			
(Angola)	Augusto						1993							
(Angola)	Bani											1998		
(Angola)	Barriga										1997			
(Angola)	Bebucho									1996	1997			
(Angola)	Bendinha									1996	1997			
(Angola)	Costa					1992	1993							
(Angola)	Deodato											1998		
(Angola)	Gabriel			DF								1998		
(Angola)	Gira											1998		
(Angola)	Hélder						1993							
(Angola)	Hilário											1998		
(Angola)	Janeiro				→	1992								
(Angola)	Janguelito	João Imanga					1993			1996	1997			
(Angola)	Jesus				→	1992								
(Angola)	João Baptista			GK								1998		
(Angola)	Jorge Andrade											1998		
(Angola)	Kadima									1996	1997			
(Angola)	Kepe	Avelino Baptista					1993							
(Angola)	Kungulo						1993							
(Angola)	Lando					1992								
(Angola)	Langa									1996				
(Angola)	Lilo									1996	1997			
(Angola)	Lito				→	1992								
(Angola)	Manhanha										1997			
(Angola)	Man Torras	Pedro Manuel Torres	16	FW							1997	1998		
(Angola)	Mbala									1996				
(Angola)	Mendinho	António Mendes da Silva	34	MF			1993							
(Angola)	Miloy	Hermenegildo Marcos Joaquim	17	MF								1998		
(Angola)	Miranda										1997			
(Angola)	Modé											1998		
(Angola)	Ndongala				→	1992								
(Angola)	Nelsinho										1997			
(Angola)	Nhanga	José Francisco Canhanga	23				1993							
(Angola)	Nzinga										1997			
(Angola)	Orlando Brandão	Orlando Alfredo Carlos Brandão	26		1992									
(Angola)	Paulo Dias	Paulo dos Santos Dias					1993			1996				
(Angola)	Pedro	Pedro Dias								1996				
(Angola)	Quim Faria						1993							
(Angola)	Quintas				→	1992								
(Angola)	Scura									1996	1997	1998		
(Angola)	Serginho										1997	1998		
(Angola)	Simão	Simão Lukebano	36	GK						1996	1997	1998		
(Angola)	Tonito					1992								
(Angola)	Valódia									1996	1997	1998		
(Angola)	Venâncio											1998		
(Angola)	Vidal†	Pascoal Vidal Muanha	22	FW						1996	1997			
(Angola)	Vilela	Manuel Lebre Vilela Júnior	28	→	1992									
(Angola)	Yaba											1998		
(Angola)	Yenga N'gui				→	1992								
(Angola)	Zeca	Makuntima Sebastião Gomes										1998		
(Angola)	Zezinho					1992	1993							
(Angola)	Zico	Fernando Domingos Francisco	19	FW		1992	1993							

== 1982–1990 ==
Progresso Associação do Sambizanga players 1982–1990

Nat	Nick	Name	A	P	–	L.	E.G.	Inguila				C.A.			
Nat	Nick	Name	A	P	1980	1981	1982	1983	1984	1985	1986	1987	1988	1989	1990
Nat	Nick	Name	A	P	–	–	–	–	–	–	–	–	–	–	–
(Angola)	Abreu	Abreu Augusto Leal		FW		1981	1982								
(Angola)	Altino	Altino Rodrigues		FW					1984						
(Angola)	António	António Morais		MF		1981	1982		1984						
(Angola)	Augusto			GK			1982	1983	1984						
(Angola)	Bento	Bento Domingos de Sousa		DF					1984						
(Angola)	Betinho			MF					1984						
(Angola)	Brasileiro			FW					1984						
(Angola)	Cardoso			DF		1981	1982								
(Angola)	Daniel								1984						
(Angola)	David			DF				1983	1984						
(Angola)	Dé	António José de Andrade		MF		1981									
(Angola)	Deny	Ketevatona Nsungo Denis		FW		1981	1982	1983							
(Angola)	Eduardo André	Eduardo André		MF	1980	1981	1982								
(Angola)	Feliciano			MF			1982								
(Angola)	Ferreira Pinto	Ferreira Pinto		DF		1981	1982	1983	1984						
(Angola)	Figueira			MF		1981									
(Angola)	Garrincha			DF		1981	1982								
(Angola)	Gaspar			FW					1984						
(Angola)	Gomes			DF		1981									
(Angola)	Guimas			MF		1981	1982								
(Angola)	Humberto			DF	1980										
(Angola)	Jaime	António de Jesus Jaime	28	DF	1980	1981	1982	1983	1984						
(Angola)	Joãozinho	João António Pascoal Neto		FW		1981		1983	1984						
(Angola)	Julião			FW		1981									
(Angola)	Kiala			FW			1982								
(Angola)	Kito			DF	1980										
(Angola)	Lino			FW					1984						
(Angola)	Little John			FW		1981		1983	1984						
(Angola)	Luís Cão †	Luís João Baptista	28	GK	1980	1981	1982	1983	1984						
(Angola)	Manuel			DF	1980	1981									
(Angola)	Massandela			FW	1980										
(Angola)	Matateu	Guilherme Francisco de Sousa	24	MF			1982	1983	1984						
(Angola)	Messo			MF			1982								
(Angola)	Mirage	Muanza Mirage		FW			1982								
(Angola)	Mitó	Domingos Cristóvão da Silva		MF				1983							
(Angola)	Nando Figueira	Fernando Figueira		MF	1980	1981									
(Angola)	Ndombele			FW			1982	1983	1984						
(Angola)	Nelito			FW		1981	1982								
(Angola)	Nguami			DF				1983							
(Angola)	Pacheco						1982	1983							
(Angola)	Padrão †	Manuel Padrão		DF		1981	1982								
(Angola)	Paulo			DF		1981									
(Angola)	Pedrito							1983							
(Angola)	Pick			DF				1983	1984						
(Angola)	Pontes			GK		1981									
(Angola)	Praia †	Inácio Lino Gomes de Carvalho	31	MF	1980	1981	1982	1983	1984						
(Angola)	Rola			DF					1984						
(Angola)	Roldão			FW	1980										
(Angola)	S. José			DF		1981									
(Angola)	Sakaneno	Sakaneno Tomás		DF			1982	1983	→						
(Angola)	Salviano	Salviano Ferreira Magalhães	33	DF		1981	1982	1983	1984						
(Angola)	Santinho	Santos do Amaral	28	FW	1980	1981	1982	1983	1984						
(Angola)	Santo António	Domingos José Diogo	25	DF		1981	→								
(Angola)	Sorcier	Zolana Eduardo Sorcier	24	MF			1982	1983	1984						
(Angola)	Tobias	Tobias L. Porfírio		FW		1981			1984						
(Angola)	Vata	Vata Matanu Garcia	21	FW			1982	1983							
(Angola)	Vieira Dias	José Vieira Dias Paulino do Carmo	22	FW		1981	→								
(Angola)	Xaxão						1982								
(Angola)	Zandú †	Zandu João	26	MF		1981	→								
(Angola)	Zé Luís	José Luís Pereira		DF		1981	1982	1983	1984						
(Angola)	Zezinho			FW			1982	1983	1984						
(Angola)	Zolana			MF			1982								
