= 1989 Girabola =

Girabola 1989
- Season: 1989 (–)
- Champions: Petro Luanda
- Relegated: None
- 1990 African Cup of Champions Clubs: Petro Luanda (Girabola winner)
- Matches: 182
- Top goalscorer: André Ernesto (18 goals)

The 1989 Girabola was the 11th season of top-tier football competition in Angola. Atlético Petróleos de Luanda were the defending champions.

The league comprised 14 teams, none of which were relegated.

Petro de Luanda were crowned champions, winning their 6th title, and fourth in a row, while there were no relegations.

André Miguel Ernesto of Desportivo da Cuca finished as the top scorer with 18 goals.

Vieira Dias of Primeiro de Agosto set an all-time championship's record of most goals scored in a single match by one player, by scoring six goals in D'Agosto's 7–0 home win over Sassamba.

== Changes from the 1989 season ==
Relegated: Desportivo de Benguela, Dínamos do Kwanza Sul, Fabril do Uíge, Inter do Namibe
Promoted: Desportivo da Cuca, Desportivo da EKA, Sassamba da Lunda Sul, Sporting de Benguela

Locations of the 1988 Girabola teams

== League table ==
Pos	Team	Pld	W	D	L	GF	GA	GD	Pts	Qualification or relegation
1	Petro de Luanda (C)	22	14	5	3	38	21	+17	33	Qualification for Champions Cup
2	Primeiro de Maio	23	10	11	2	29	18	+11	31	
3	Primeiro de Agosto	26	10	8	8	34	25	+9	28	
4	TAAG (Note: Name later reverted to its original ASA)	25	7	11	7	27	24	+3	25	
5	Desportivo da EKA	22	9	8	5	26	20	+6	26	
6	Ferroviário da Huíla	23	9	6	8	34	24	+10	24	
7	FC de Cabinda	21	8	6	7	21	16	+5	22	
8	Desportivo da Cuca	24	9	6	9	27	22	+5	24	
9	Petro do Huambo	22	9	4	9	27	25	+2	22	
10	Mambroa (Note: Name later reverted to Benfica do Huambo)	23	9	5	9	26	31	−5	23	
11	Inter de Luanda (Note: Name later changed to Interclube)	25	7	9	9	22	26	−4	23	
12	Sagrada Esperança	23	6	10	7	23	23	0	22	
13	Sporting de Benguela	23	5	3	15	13	39	−26	13	
14	Sassamba	20	1	4	15	17	50	−33	6	

Updated to match(es) played on 22 November 1989. Source: Girabola.com
Rules for classification: 1) Points; 2) Head-to-head points; 3) Head-to-head goal difference; 4) Goal difference; 5) Goals scored; 6) Fair-play points; 7) Play-off
(C) Champions

== Results ==
Home \ Away	DCU	DEK	DTA	FCC	FHL	INT	MAM	PET	PHU	PRI	PRM	SAG	SAS	SBE
Desportivo da Cuca	—	1–2	1–2		1–0	0–1	2–1	0–2	2–1	1–0		1–0	3–2	7–1
Desportivo da EKA	1–1	—	1–1		2–1	0–1	2–2		1–0	1–0		2–1	3–0 (Note: Desportivo da EKA was awarded a 3–0 win)	0–0
Desportivo da TAAG	0–0	0–2	—	1–1	3–1	1–2	0–0	1–1	1–2	0–0	0–2	1–1	4–1	3–1
FC de Cabinda	1–0	1–1	0–1	—	0–0	0–0		3–2	3–1	1–0	3–0		1–0	3–0
Ferroviário da Huíla	1–0	0–0	3–1	2–0	—	2–3	4–0	3–3	2–0	1–1	0–0	1–1	3–0	3–0 (Note: Ferroviário da Huíla was awarded a 3–0 win)
Inter de Luanda	0–0	0–3	0–3	0–0	1–1	—	1–2	0–1	1–1	1–1	2–2	1–1	1–0	2–0
Mambroa	4–3		1–0	1–0	2–0	1–0	—	2–1		1–1	3–1	1–0	3–3	1–1
Petro de Luanda	1–1	2–0	0–1	1–0	3–2	1–1	1–0	—	3–2	3–0		1–0		2–0
Petro do Huambo	1–0	2–1		1–0		0–3	1–0	0–1	—	0–1	0–0	2–0	6–1	1–0
Primeiro de Agosto	1–0	4–0	1–1	2–0	0–3	1–0	2–0	0–1	1–1	—	1–1	2–0	7–0	2–1
Primeiro de Maio	0–0	0–0	0–0	2–2	2–0	1–0	2–0	2–2	1–0	3–1	—	1–1	4–3	1–0
Sagrada Esperança	0–0	2–2	0–0	1–0		3–0 (Note: Sagrada Esperança was awarded a 3–0 win)	2–0	2–3	2–4	2–1	0–0	—		1–1
Sassamba da LS	0–2	1–3	1–2				0–1	1–3	1–1	2–2	0–1	0–0	—	1–0
Sporting de Benguela	0–1	1–0	1–0	0–2	1–0	2–1	2–1		0–0	1–2	0–3	0–2		—

Updated to match(es) played on 22 November 1989. Source: girabola.com
Legend: Blue = home team win; Yellow = draw; Red = away team win.

== Season statistics ==
=== Scorers ===
R/T
R/T	DCU	DEK	DTA	FCC	FHL	INT	MAM	PET	PHU	PRI	PRM	SAG	SAS	SBE	TOTAL
1	25/2/89	25/2/89	26/2/89	29/3/89	26/2/89	26/2/89	26/2/89	26/2/89	25/2/89	26/2/89	26/2/89	29/3/89	25/2/89	26/2/89	
1	DCU–DEK 1–2; André '	DCU–DEK 1–2; Bula ' pen. David '	DTA–PRI 0–0	SAG–FCC 1–0	FHL–PET 3–3; Jorgito x2	MAM–INT 1–0	MAM–INT 1–0; Figueiredo '	FHL–PET 3–3; Bolingó ' Esquerdinho ' Paulito '	SAS–PHU 1–1; Nhanga 21'	DTA–PRI 0–0	SBE–PRM 0–3; Enoque ' Fusso ' Miguel '	SAG–FCC 1–0	SAS–PHU 1–1; Luisinho '	SBE–PRM 0–3	
2	4/3/89	17/5/89	4/3/89	4/3/89	5/3/89	4/3/89	4/3/89	4/3/89	15/7/89	5/3/89	5/3/89	15/7/89	5/3/89	17/5/89	
2	INT–DCU 0–0	DEK–SBE 0–0	FCC–DTA 1–1	FCC–DTA 1–1	PRI–FHL 0–3; Nelson 25' o.g. Jorgito 61' 90'	INT–DCU 0–0	PET–MAM 1–0	PET–MAM 1–0; Paulão 72'	PHU–SAG 2–0	PRI–FHL 0–3	PRM–SAS 4–3	PHU–SAG 2–0	PRM–SAS 4–3	DEK–SBE 0–0	
3	12/3/89	12/3/89	11/3/89	11/3/89	12/3/89	12/3/89	12/3/89	12/3/89	11/3/89	11/3/89	2/7/89	2/7/89	12/3/89	12/3/89	
3	DCU–PET 0–2	SAS–DEK 1–3; David ' Quintas ' Xixão '	DTA–PHU 1–2	PRI–FCC 2–0	MAM–FHL 2–0	SBE–INT 2–1	MAM–FHL 2–0	DCU–PET 0–2	DTA–PHU 1–2	PRI–FCC 2–0	SAG–PRM 0–0	SAG–PRM 0–0	SAS–DEK 1–3	SBE–INT 2–1	
4	18/3/89	19/3/89	19/3/89	19/3/89	19/3/89	19/3/89	18/3/89	9/7/89	19/3/89	19/3/89	19/3/89	19/3/89	19/3/89	9/7/89	
4	DCU–MAM 2–1	DEK–SAG 2–1	PRM–DTA 0–0	FHL–FCC 2–0	FHL–FCC 2–0	INT–SAS 1–0	DCU–MAM 2–1	PET–SBE 2–0	PHU–PRI 0–1	PHU–PRI 0–1	PRM–DTA 0–0	DEK–SAG 2–1	INT–SAS 1–0	PET–SBE 2–0	
5	26/3/89	25/3/89	25/3/89	14/7/89	26/3/89	21/6/89	31/5/89	4/6/89	14/7/89	5/7/89	5/7/89	21/6/89	4/6/89	31/5/89	
5	DCU–FHL 1–0	DTA–DEK 0–2; Bula ' David '	DTA–DEK 0–2	FCC–PHU 3–1	DCU–FHL 1–0	SAG–INT 3–0; WALKOVER	MAM–SBE 1–1; Figueiredo '	SAS–PET 1–3	FCC–PHU 3–1	PRM–PRI 3–1	PRM–PRI 3–1	SAG–INT 3–0; WALKOVER	SAS–PET 1–3	MAM–SBE 1–1; Serginho 46'	
6	4/6/89	2/4/89	1/4/89	24/5/89	21/6/89	1/4/89	2/4/89	17/5/89	21/6/89	2/4/89	24/5/89	17/5/89	2/4/89	4/6/89	
6	DCU–SBE 7–1; André x4	DEK–PRI 1–0	INT–DTA 0–3	PRM–FCC 2–2	FHL–PHU 2–0	INT–DTA 0–3	MAM–SAS 3–3	PET–SAG 1–0	FHL–PHU 2–0	DEK–PRI 1–0	PRM–FCC 2–2	PET–SAG 1–0	MAM–SAS 3–3	DCU–SBE 7–1	
7	16/4/89	15/4/89	10/5/89	15/4/89	2/7/89	3/5/89	7/6/89	10/5/89	9/7/89	3/5/89	9/7/89	7/6/89	16/4/89	2/7/89	
7	SAS–DCU 0–2	FCC–DEK 0–0	DTA–PET 1–1; Bass '	FCC–DEK 0–0	SBE–FHL 1–0	PRI–INT 1–0	SAG–MAM 2–0	DTA–PET 1–1; Mona '	PHU–PRM 0–0	PRI–INT 1–0; Manuel Martins 85'	PHU–PRM 0–0	SAG–MAM 2–0	SAS–DCU 1–2	SBE–FHL 1–0	
8	22/4/89	2/7/89	22/4/89	22/4/89	28/6/89	22/4/89	22/4/89	2/7/89	2/7/89	2/7/89	28/6/89	22/4/89	22/4/89	22/4/89	
8	DCU–SAG 1–0	DEK–PHU 1–0; Bula '	MAM–DTA 1–0	INT–FCC 0–0	PRM–FHL 2–0	INT–FCC 0–0	MAM–DTA 1–0	PET–PRI 3–0	DEK–PHU 1–0	PET–PRI 3–0	PRM–FHL 2–0	DCU–SAG 1–0	SAS–SBE 1–0	SAS–SBE 1–0	
9	29/4/89	12/7/89	29/4/89	29/4/89		30/4/89	30/4/89	29/4/89	30/4/89	30/4/89	12/7/89	29/4/89		29/4/89	
9	DTA–DCU 0–0	PRM–DEK 0–0	DTA–DCU 0–0	FCC–PET 3–2; Fanfan 47'; Assana 55'; Mavinga 90+4'	FHL–SAS 3–0	PHU–INT 0–3; Bebeto ' Jesus ' Raúl '	PRI–MAM 2–0	FCC–PET 3–2; Bolingó ' Ralph 72'	PHU–INT 0–3	PRI–MAM 2–0; Manuel Martins ' Vieira Dias '	PRM–DEK 0–0	SAG–SBE 1–1	FHL–SAS 3–0	SAG–SBE 1–1	
10	7/5/89	7/5/89	7/5/89	7/5/89	7/5/89	6/5/89	7/5/89	6/5/89	6/5/89	7/5/89	6/5/89	17/6/89	17/6/89	7/5/89	
10	DCU–PRI 1–0	DEK–FHL 2–1	SBE–DTA 1–0	MAM–FCC 1–0	DEK–FHL 2–1	INT–PRM 2–2	MAM–FCC 1–0	PET–PHU 3–2; Avelino 37'; Esquerdinho 48'; Mona '	PET–PHU 3–2; Zacarias 79' ?	DCU–PRI 1–0	INT–PRM 2–2	SAS–SAG 0–0	SAS–SAG 0–0	SBE–DTA 1–0	
11	13/5/89	14/5/89	14/5/89	13/5/89	13/5/89	14/5/89	14/5/89	14/5/89	14/5/89	13/5/89	14/5/89	13/5/89	14/5/89	13/5/89	
11	FCC–DCU 1–0	DEK–INT 0–1	DTA–SAS 4–1	FCC–DCU 1–0	FHL–SAG 1–1; Jorgito '	DEK–INT 0–1	PHU–MAM 1–0	PRM–PET 2–2	PHU–MAM 1–0	PRI–SBE 2–1; Valentim 59'; Ndisso 78'	PRM–PET 2–2	FHL–SAG 1–1; Quintino '	DTA–SAS 4–1	PRI–SBE 2–1; Serginho 6'	
12	20/5/89	21/5/89	25/6/89	21/5/89	21/5/89	21/5/89	21/5/89	21/5/89	20/5/89	20/5/89	21/5/89	25/6/89	20/5/89	21/5/89	
12	DCU–PHU 2–1; André 14'; França 81'	PET–DEK 2–0	SAG–DTA 0–0	SBE–FCC 0–2	FHL–INT 2–3	FHL–INT 2–3	MAM–PRM 3–1	PET–DEK 2–0	DCU–PHU 2–1; Luís Bento 30' pen.	SAS–PRI 2–2	MAM–PRM 3–1	SAG–DTA 0–0	SAS–PRI 2–2	SBE–FCC 0–2	
13	28/5/89	9/7/89	27/5/89	28/5/89	27/5/89	28/5/89	9/7/89	28/5/89	28/5/89	28/5/89	28/5/89	28/5/89	28/5/89	28/5/89	
13	PRM–DCU 0–0	DEK–MAM 2–2	DTA–FHL 3–1; Bass x2 Teófilo '	FCC–SAS 1–0	DTA–FHL 3–1; Mavó '	INT–PET 0–1	DEK–MAM 2–2	INT–PET 0–1	PHU–SBE 1–0	PRI–SAG 2–0	PRM–DCU 0–0	PRI–SAG 2–0	FCC–SAS 1–0	PHU–SBE 1–0	
14	16/7/89	16/7/89	16/7/89	31/8/89	15/7/89	15/7/89	15/7/89	15/7/89	30/8/89	16/7/89	16/7/89	31/8/89	30/8/89	16/7/89	
14	DEK–DCU 1–1	DEK–DCU 1–1	PRI–DTA 1–1	FCC–SAG –	PET–FHL 3–2; Jorgito ' Tucha '	INT–MAM 1–2	INT–MAM 1–2	PET–FHL 3–2; Luisinho x2 Paulito '	PHU–SAS 6–1	PRI–DTA 1–1	PRM–SBE 1–0	FCC–SAG –	PHU–SAS 6–1	PRM–SBE 1–0	
15	22/7/89	23/7/89	23/7/89	23/7/89	23/7/89	22/7/89	23/7/89	23/7/89	22/7/89	23/7/89	22/7/89	22/7/89	22/7/89	23/7/89	
15	DCU–INT 0–1	SBE–DEK 1–0	DTA–FCC 1–1	DTA–FCC 1–1	FHL–PRI 1–1; Jorgito 75'	DCU–INT 0–1; Mendinho 64'	MAM–PET 2–1; Panzo ' Rosário '	MAM–PET 2–1; Mona 51'	SAG–PHU 2–4	FHL–PRI 1–1; Russo 15'	SAS–PRM 0–1	SAG–PHU 2–4	SAS–PRM 0–1	SBE–DEK 1–0	
16	4/11/89		6/8/89	5/8/89	6/8/89	30/8/89	6/8/89	4/11/89	6/8/89	5/8/89	18/10/89	18/10/89		30/8/89	
16	PET–DCU 1–1; Zequita '	DEK–SAS 3–0; WALKOVER	PHU–DTA –	FCC–PRI 1–0; Pedrito 46'	FHL–MAM 4–0	INT–SBE 2–0	FHL–MAM 4–0	PET–DCU 1–1; Mona '	PHU–DTA –	FCC–PRI 1–0	PRM–SAG 1–1	PRM–SAG 1–1	DEK–SAS 3–0; WALKOVER	INT–SBE 2–0	
17	13/8/89	12/8/89	23/8/89	12/8/89	12/8/89		13/8/89	19/10/89	27/9/89	27/9/89	23/8/89	12/8/89		19/10/89	
17	MAM–DCU 4–3; Chiquinho x3	SAG–DEK 2–2	DTA–PRM 0–2	FCC–FHL 0–1	FCC–FHL 0–1; Paulão '	SAS–INT –	MAM–DCU 4–3; Figueiredo x2	SBE–PET –	PRI–PHU 1–1; Jamaica 22' pen.	PRI–PHU 1–1; Kiss 31'	DTA–PRM 0–2; Jorge ' Minguito '	SAG–DEK 2–2	SAS–INT –	SBE–PET –	
18	20/8/89	20/9/89	20/9/89	20/8/89	20/8/89	20/8/89	20/8/89	19/8/89	20/8/89	19/8/89	19/8/89	20/8/89	19/8/89	20/8/89	
18	FHL–DCU 1–0	DEK–DTA 1–1	DEK–DTA 1–1	PHU–FCC 1–0	FHL–DCU 1–0	INT–SAG 1–1	SBE–MAM 2–1	PET–SAS –	PHU–FCC 1–0	PRI–PRM 1–1	PRI–PRM 1–1	INT–SAG 1–1	PET–SAS –	SBE–MAM 2–1	
19	24/9/89	5/11/89	23/9/89	24/9/89	24/9/89	23/9/89	23/9/89	23/9/89	24/9/89	5/11/89	24/9/89	23/9/89	23/9/89	24/9/89	
19	SBE–DCU 0–1; André '	PRI–DEK 4–0	DTA–INT 1–2; Teófilo 77'	FCC–PRM 3–0	PHU–FHL –	DTA–INT 1–2; Zeferino 24'; Mendinho 49'	SAS–MAM 0–1	SAG–PET 2–3	PHU–FHL –	PRI–DEK 4–0; Vieira Dias x3	FCC–PRM 3–0	SAG–PET 2–3	SAS–MAM 0–1	SBE–DCU 0–1	
20	30/9/89		30/9/89		1/10/89	1/10/89	4/11/89	30/9/89	1/10/89	1/10/89	1/10/89	4/11/89	30/9/89	1/10/89	
20	DCU–SAS 3–2; André x3	DEK–FCC –	PET–DTA 0–1	DEK–FCC –	FHL–SBE 3–0; WALKOVER	INT–PRI 1–1	MAM–SAG 0–2	PET–DTA 0–1	PRM–PHU 1–0	INT–PRI 1–1	PRM–PHU 1–0	MAM–SAG 0–2	DCU–SAS 3–2; Pegado x2	FHL–SBE 3–0; WALKOVER	
21	23/11/89	26/11/89	7/10/89	8/10/89	8/10/89	8/10/89	7/10/89	8/10/89	26/11/89	8/10/89	8/10/89	23/11/89			
21	SAG–DCU 0–0	PHU–DEK 2–1	DTA–MAM 0–0	FCC–INT 0–0	FHL–PRM 0–0	FCC–INT 0–0	DTA–MAM 0–0	PRI–PET 0–1; Ralph 35' pen.	PHU–DEK 2–1	PRI–PET 0–1	FHL–PRM 0–0	SAG–DCU 0–0	SBE–SAS –	SBE–SAS –	
22	14/10/89		14/10/89	15/10/89	14/10/89	14/10/89	15/10/89	15/10/89	14/10/89	15/10/89		15/10/89	14/10/89	15/10/89	
22	DCU–DTA 1–2	DEK–PRM –	DCU–DTA 1–2	PET–FCC 1–0	SAS–FHL –	INT–PHU 1–1	MAM–PRI 1–1	PET–FCC 1–0	INT–PHU 1–1	MAM–PRI 1–1	DEK–PRM –	SBE–SAG 0–2	SAS–FHL –	SBE–SAG 0–2	
23	21/10/89	22/10/89	22/10/89		22/10/89	22/10/89		22/10/89	22/10/89	21/10/89	22/10/89	21/10/89	21/10/89	22/10/89	
23	PRI–DCU 1–0	FHL–DEK 0–0	DTA–SBE 3–1	FCC–MAM –	FHL–DEK 0–0	PRM–INT 1–0	FCC–MAM –	PHU–PET 0–1	PHU–PET 0–1	PRI–DCU 1–0; Valentim ' pen.	PRM–INT 1–0; Jeef '	SAG–SAS –	SAG–SAS –	DTA–SBE 3–1	
24	28/10/89	28/10/89	19/11/89	28/10/89	28/10/89	28/10/89						28/10/89	19/11/89		
24	DCU–FCC –	INT–DEK 0–3; David 19' 45' 75'	SAS–DTA 1–2	DCU–FCC –	SAG–FHL –	INT–DEK 0–3	MAM–PHU –	PET–PRM –	MAM–PHU –	SBE–PRI 1–2	PET–PRM –	SAG–FHL –	SAS–DTA 1–2	SBE–PRI 1–2	
25	19/11/89		8/11/89	14/11/89	15/11/89	15/11/89	14/11/89		19/11/89	12/11/89	14/11/89	8/11/89	12/11/89	14/11/89	
25	PHU–DCU 1–0	DEK–PET –	DTA–SAG 1–1	FCC–SBE 3–0	INT–FHL 1–1	INT–FHL 1–1; Bebé '	PRM–MAM 2–0	DEK–PET –	PHU–DCU 1–0	PRI–SAS 7–0; Vieira Dias x6	PRM–MAM 2–0	DTA–SAG 1–1	PRI–SAS 7–0	FCC–SBE 3–0	
26			23/11/89		23/11/89	19/11/89		19/11/89		19/11/89		19/11/89			
26	DCU–PRM –	MAM–DEK –	FHL–DTA 3–1	SAS–FCC –	FHL–DTA 3–1	PET–INT 1–1; Bebeto ' pen.	MAM–DEK –	PET–INT 1–1; Luisinho '	SBE–PHU –	SAG–PRI 2–1; Vieira Dias '	DCU–PRM –	SAG–PRI 2–1	SAS–FCC –	SBE–PHU –	
T															

=== Top scorer ===
- (Angola) André Miguel Ernesto

== Champions ==
1989 Girabola winner

6th title

Squad: Adinho, Bolingó, Carlos Pedro, Felito, Janguelito, Lúcio, Luisinho, Mona, Nejó, Norberto, Paulão, Paulito, Quim Sebas, Ralph, Rasgado, Wilson
Head coach: Carlos Queirós
