= 1992 Girabola =

Girabola 1992
- Season: 1992 (–)
- Champions: 1º de Agosto
- Relegated: Inter Luanda; Benf Cabinda
- 1993 African Cup of Champions Clubs: 1º de Agosto (Girabola winner)
- 1993 CAF Cup: ASA (Girabola runner-up)
- Matches played: 240
- Top goalscorer: Amaral (20 goals)

The 1992 Girabola was the 14th season of top-tier football competition in Angola. C.D. Primeiro de Agosto were the defending champions.

The league comprised 16 teams, the bottom two of which were relegated.

Primeiro de Agosto were crowned champions, winning their 5th title, while Inter de Luanda and Benfica de Cabinda were relegated.

Amaral Aleixo of Sagrada Esperança finished as the top scorer with 20 goals.

== Changes from the 1991 season ==
Relegated: Desportivo da Cuca, Desportivo de Saurimo
Promoted: Desportivo da Nocal, Inter da Huíla

Locations of the 1992 Girabola teams

== League table ==
Pos	Team	Pld	W	D	L	GF	GA	GD	Pts	Qualification or relegation
1	Primeiro de Agosto (C)	29	18	10	1	45	19	+26	46	Qualification for Champions Cup
2	ASA	29	12	15	2	31	12	+19	39	Qualification for CAF Cup
3	Primeiro de Maio	28	15	8	5	50	14	+36	38	
4	Petro de Luanda	29	15	8	6	44	24	+20	38	
5	Petro do Huambo	29	12	9	8	44	21	+23	33	
6	FC de Cabinda	28	12	5	11	28	44	−16	29	
7	Benfica do Huambo	29	8	12	9	32	28	+4	28	
8	Desportivo da Nocal	30	7	13	10	29	33	−4	27	
9	Sagrada Esperança	27	10	7	10	34	40	−6	27	
10	Desportivo da EKA	30	9	9	12	32	40	−8	27	
11	Nacional de Benguela	28	10	6	12	29	32	−3	26	
12	Sporting de Benguela	30	7	11	12	20	28	−8	25	
13	Ferroviário da Huíla	29	6	9	14	27	41	−14	21	
14	Inter da Huíla	29	6	9	14	26	42	−16	21	
15	Inter de Luanda (Note: Name later changed to Interclube) (R)	29	3	15	11	21	44	−23	21	Relegation to Provincial stages
16	Benfica de Cabinda (R)	29	5	6	18	19	51	−32	16	Relegation to Provincial stages

Updated to match(es) played on 22 November 1992. Source: Girabola.com
Rules for classification: 1) Points; 2) Head-to-head points; 3) Head-to-head goal difference; 4) Goal difference; 5) Goals scored; 6) Fair-play points; 7) Play-off.
(C) Champions; (R) Relegated

== Results ==
Home \ Away	ASA	BCB	BHU	DEK	DNO	FCC	FHL	IHL	INT	NAC	PET	PHU	PRI	PRM	SAG	SBE
ASA	—	1–0	0–0	3–1	2–1	4–0	1–0	0–0	0–0	1–0	2–0	0–1	2–2	1–0	4–1	3–0 (Note: ASA was awarded a 3–0 win)
Benfica de Cabinda	0–1	—	1–2	2–0	2–2	0–1	0–0	2–1	1–1	1–2	1–0	1–1	0–0	1–0	3–4	1–0
Benfica do Huambo	0–0	5–0	—	1–1	0–0	4–0	3–1	4–1	0–0	1–1	1–1	0–2	0–1	0–2	1–0	2–0
Desportivo da EKA	0–0	2–1	3–0	—	2–1	0–2	2–1	0–0	2–1	3–1	2–2	1–0	1–1	0–1	2–2	0–0
Desportivo da Nocal	1–0	2–1	1–1	1–1	—	2–0	1–1	1–0	2–2	2–1	0–1	3–3	0–2	0–1	2–2	0–0
FC de Cabinda	0–0	3–0 (Note: FC de Cabinda was awarded a 3–0 win)		1–0	2–1	—	0–1	1–0	1–1	2–1	2–1	2–1	0–1	1–0	2–1	1–1
Ferroviário da Huíla		2–0	1–1	2–0	1–1	3–3	—	1–2	2–1	0–0	1–1	0–1	0–0	0–0	3–1	4–1
Inter da Huíla	0–0	1–0	2–2	3–1	1–1	4–0	0–1	—	3–1	2–3	0–3	0–0	2–1	1–4	0–1	0–0
Inter de Luanda	1–1	2–1	0–0	2–2	0–0	0–2	1–0	1–1	—	1–4		1–0	2–2	0–4	0–1	0–0
Nacional de Benguela	0–0		2–0	3–2	0–1	2–0	3–0	1–0	0–0	—	0–1	0–0	0–0	1–0	0–2	1–2
Petro de Luanda	1–1	3–0	2–0	4–1	1–0	3–1	1–0	4–1	0–0	1–2	—	1–1	0–1	3–1	2–1	1–0
Petro do Huambo	1–1	3–0 (Note: Petro do Huambo was awarded a 3–0 win)	1–0	0–1	2–0	2–0	4–1	4–0	4–1		1–2	—	1–2	1–1	2–0	0–0
Primeiro de Agosto	0–0	1–0	2–2	1–0	2–1	4–1	2–0	2–0	3–2	2–0	2–1	2–1	—		4–0	2–1
Primeiro de Maio	0–0	8–0	1–0	1–0	2–2	7–0	3–1	2–0	5–0	4–1	0–0	0–0	0–0	—		1–0
Sagrada Esperança	1–1	0–0	2–1	2–1	0–1		2–0		3–0 (Note: Sagrada Esperança was awarded a 3–0 win)	3–0	0–2	0–7	1–1	1–1	—	3–0 (Note: Sagrada Esperança was awarded a 3–0 win)
Sporting de Benguela	1–2	1–0	0–1	2–0	1–0	0–0	4–0	1–1	0–0	1–0	2–2	1–0	1–2	0–1	0–0	—

Updated to match(es) played on 22 November 1994. Source: girabola.com
Legend: Blue = home team win; Yellow = draw; Red = away team win.

== Season statistics ==
=== Scorers ===
R/T
R/T	ASA	BCB	BHU	DEK	DNO	FCC	FHL	IHL	INT	NAC	PET	PHU	PRI	PRM	SAG	SBE	TOTAL
1	7/3/92	8/3/92	8/3/92	8/3/92	7/3/92	8/3/92	8/3/92	8/3/92	8/3/92	8/3/92	8/3/92	8/3/92	8/3/92	8/3/92	8/3/92	8/3/92	
1	DNO–ASA 1–0	BHU–BCB 5–0	BHU–BCB 5–0	DEK–FHL 2–1	DNO–ASA 1–1	FCC–PRM 1–0	DEK–FHL 2–1	IHL–NAC 2–3	INT–SBE 0–0	IHL–NAC 2–3	PRI–PET 2–1; Amaral '	SAG–PHU 0–7	PRI–PET 2–1; Ndisso '	FCC–PRM 1–0	SAG–PHU 0–7	INT–SBE 0–0	
2	15/3/92	15/3/92	14/3/92	14/3/92	12/3/92	15/3/92	15/3/92	14/3/92	11/3/92	15/3/92	11/3/92	15/3/92	14/3/92	14/3/92	14/3/92	12/3/92	
2	ASA–FHL 1–0	BCB–FCC 0–1	IHL–BHU 2–2	DEK–SAG 2–2	SBE–DNO 1–0	BCB–FCC 0–1	ASA–FHL 1–0	IHL–BHU 2–2	PET–INT 0–0	NAC–PHU 0–0	PET–INT 0–0	NAC–PHU 0–0	PRM–PRI 0–0	PRM–PRI 0–0	DEK–SAG 2–2; Babá x2	SBE–DNO 1–0; Motembe '	
3	21/3/92	18/3/92	22/3/92	22/3/92	19/3/92	21/3/92	21/3/92	21/3/92	19/3/92	22/3/92	20/3/92	22/3/92	18/3/92	20/3/92	21/3/92	21/3/92	
3	ASA–SAG 4–1; Basse x2 Kikuma ' Libengué 25'	PRI–BCB 1–0	PHU–BHU 1–0	NAC–DEK 3–2; Inácio '	INT–DNO 0–0	FCC–IHL 1–0; Fanfan '	FHL–SBE 4–1	FCC–IHL 1–0	INT–DNO 0–0	NAC–DEK 3–2	PET–PRM 3–1; Amaral x2 Luisinho '	PHU–BHU 1–0	PRI–BCB 1–0; Mbila 51'	PET–PRM 3–1; Paulão '	ASA–SAG 4–1; Luisão '	FHL–SBE 4–1	
4	29/3/92	29/4/92	29/3/92	29/3/92	28/3/92	28/3/92	28/3/92	26/3/92	29/3/92	29/3/92	29/4/92	28/3/92	26/3/92	29/3/92			
4	ASA–NAC 1–0	BCB–PET 1–0	BHU–DEK 1–1	BHU–DEK 1–1	DNO–FHL 1–1; Paulão '	PHU–FCC 2–0	DNO–FHL 1–1; Silva '	PRI–IHL 2–0	PRM–INT 5–0	ASA–NAC 1–0	BCB–PET 1–0	PHU–FCC 2–0; Picas 23'; Balsa 25'	PRI–IHL 2–0; Ndisso x2	PRM–INT 5–0	SAG–SBE 3–0; WALKOVER	SAG–SBE 3–0; WALKOVER	
5	4/4/92	4/4/92	4/4/92	4/4/92	5/4/92	4/4/92	4/4/92	5/4/92	4/4/92	5/4/92	5/4/92	9/4/92	9/4/92	4/4/92	5/4/92	5/4/92	
5	BHU–ASA 0–0	BCB–PRM 1–0; Jacques ' pen.	BHU–ASA 0–0	DEK–FCC 0–2	DNO–SAG 2–2	DEK–FCC 0–2	FHL–INT 2–1; Osvaldo x2	IHL–PET 0–3	FHL–INT 2–1; Gerry '	SBE–NAC 1–0	IHL–PET 0–3	PHU–PRI 1–2; Abílio Amaral '	PHU–PRI 1–2; Muanza 20'; Mbila 65'	BCB–PRM 1–0	DNO–SAG 2–2	SBE–NAC 1–0	
6	11/4/92	11/4/92	11/4/92	12/4/92	12/4/92	11/4/92	11/4/92	12/4/92	11/4/92	12/4/92	11/4/92	11/4/92	12/4/92	12/4/92	11/4/92	11/4/92	
6	FCC–ASA 0–0	INT–BCB 2–1	SBE–BHU 0–1; Panzo '	PRI–DEK 1–0	DNO–NAC 2–1	FCC–ASA 0–0	SAG–FHL 2–0	PRM–IHL 2–0	INT–BCB 2–1	DNO–NAC 2–1	PET–PHU 1–1; Amaral 30'	PET–PHU 1–1; Geovetty 37'	PRI–DEK 1–0; Ndisso 88'	PRM–IHL 2–0	SAG–FHL 2–0	SBE–BHU 0–1	
7	19/4/92	19/4/92	19/4/92	16/4/92	19/4/92	18/4/92	19/4/92	19/4/92	18/4/92	19/4/92	16/4/92	18/4/92	19/4/92	18/4/92	18/4/92	18/4/92	
7	PRI–ASA 0–0	IHL–BCB 1–0	BHU–DNO 0–0	PET–DEK 4–1; Inácio 40' pen.	BHU–DNO 0–0	FCC–SBE 1–1	NAC–FHL 3–0	IHL–BCB 1–0	SAG–INT 3–0; WALKOVER	NAC–FHL 3–0	PET–DEK 4–1; Amaral 28'; Nelo Bumba 31'; Luisinho 35' ?	PRM–PHU 0–0	PRI–ASA 0–0	PRM–PHU 0–0	SAG–INT 3–0; WALKOVER	FCC–SBE 1–1	
8	25/4/92	25/4/92	26/4/92	25/4/92	26/4/92	26/4/92	26/4/92	25/4/92	25/4/92	25/4/92	25/4/92	25/4/92	26/4/92	25/4/92	25/4/92	26/4/92	
8	ASA–PET 2–0; Miranda 45'	BCB–PHU 1–1	FHL–BHU 1–1	DEK–PRM 0–1	DNO–FCC 2–0	DNO–FCC 2–0	FHL–BHU 1–1	INT–IHL 1–1	INT–IHL 1–1	NAC–SAG 0–2	ASA–PET 2–0	BCB–PHU 1–1	SBE–PRI 1–2	DEK–PRM 0–1	NAC–SAG 0–2; Chicangala 20'; Luisão 30'	SBE–PRI 1–2	
9	2/5/92	2/5/92	2/5/92	2/5/92	3/5/92	3/5/92	3/5/92	3/5/92	2/5/92	2/5/92	3/5/92	3/5/92	3/5/92	2/5/92	2/5/92	3/5/92	
9	PRM–ASA 0–0	BCB–DEK 2–0; Abdulah 61'; Lito 65'	SAG–BHU 2–1	BCB–DEK 2–0	DNO–PRI 0–2	FHL–FCC 3–3	FHL–FCC 3–3	PHU–IHL 4–0	INT–NAC 1–4; Joãozinho '	INT–NAC 1–4; Chico I x2 Gugú ' pen. Minhas '	SBE–PET 2–2	PHU–IHL 4–0	DNO–PRI 0–2	PRM–ASA 0–0	SAG–BHU 2–1	SBE–PET 2–2	
10	9/5/92	9/5/92	10/5/92	9/5/92	7/5/92	9/5/92	10/5/92	9/5/92	9/5/92	10/5/92	7/5/92	9/5/92	10/5/92	10/5/92	9/5/92	10/5/92	
10	ASA–BCB 1–0; Basse 32'	ASA–BCB 1–0	BHU–NAC 1–1	IHL–DEK 3–1; Luyeye '	PET–DNO 1–0	FCC–SAG 2–1; Jean-Jacques 43'; Jesus 77'	PRI–FHL 2–0	IHL–DEK 3–1; Ilico ' Maianga ' Marques '	PHU–INT 4–1; Januário '	BHU–NAC 1–1	PET–DNO 1–0; Rosário '	PHU–INT 4–1; Geovetty ' Lino ' Martins ' Valente '	PRI–FHL 2–0	PRM–SBE 1–0	FCC–SAG 2–1	PRM–SBE 1–0	
11	16/5/92	17/5/92	16/5/92	16/5/92	16/5/92	20/5/92	13/5/92	16/5/92	16/5/92	20/5/92	13/5/92	16/5/92	6/5/92	16/5/92	6/5/92	17/5/92	
11	IHL–ASA 0–0	SBE–BCB 1–0	INT–BHU 0–0	DEK–PHU 1–0	DNO–PRM 0–1	NAC–FCC 2–0	PET–FHL 1–0	IHL–ASA 0–0	INT–BHU 0–0	NAC–FCC 2–0; Chico II 9'; Rúben 42'	PET–FHL 1–0; Amaral 43'	DEK–PHU 1–0	PRI–SAG 4–0	DNO–PRM 0–1	PRI–SAG 4–0	SBE–BCB 1–0	
12	24/5/92	23/5/92	24/5/92	23/5/92	23/5/92	24/5/92	24/5/92	23/5/92	23/5/92	24/5/92	17/5/92	24/5/92	24/5/92	24/5/92	17/5/92	23/5/92	
12	ASA–PHU 0–1	BCB–DNO 2–2	BHU–FCC 4–0; Panzo x2	INT–DEK 2–2	BCB–DNO 2–2	BHU–FCC 4–0	FHL–PRM 0–0	SBE–IHL 1–1	INT–DEK 2–2	NAC–PRI 0–0	SAG–PET 0–2	ASA–PHU 0–1	NAC–PRI 0–0	FHL–PRM 0–0	SAG–PET 0–2	SBE–IHL 1–1	
13	30/5/92	30/5/92	20/5/92	30/5/92	31/5/92	30/5/92	30/5/92	31/5/92	30/5/92	2/6/92	2/6/92	31/5/92	20/5/92			31/5/92	
13	DEK–ASA 0–0	FHL–BCB 2–0	PRI–BHU 2–2	DEK–ASA 0–0	IHL–DNO 1–1	FCC–INT 1–1	FHL–BCB 2–0	IHL–DNO 1–1	FCC–INT 1–1	PET–NAC 1–2; Chico I	PET–NAC 1–2; Amaral '	PHU–SBE 0–0	PRI–BHU 2–2	PRM–SAG –	PRM–SAG –	PHU–SBE 0–0	
14	3/6/92	10/6/92	7/6/92	6/6/92	7/6/92	6/6/92	6/6/92	6/6/92	3/6/92	7/6/92	7/6/92	7/6/92	6/6/92	7/6/92	10/6/92	6/6/92	
14	ASA–INT 0–0	SAG–BCB 0–0	BHU–PET 1–1	SBE–DEK 2–0	DNO–PHU 3–3	FCC–PRI 0–1	FHL–IHL 1–2	FHL–IHL 1–2	ASA–INT 0–0	NAC–PRM 1–0	BHU–PET 1–1; Amaral '	DNO–PHU 3–3; Geovetty '	FCC–PRI 0–1	NAC–PRM 1–0	SAG–BCB 0–0	SBE–DEK 2–0	
15	14/6/92	14/6/92	14/6/92	13/6/92	13/6/92	13/6/92	14/6/92	13/6/92	10/6/92	14/6/92	13/6/92	14/6/92	10/6/92	14/6/92	13/6/92	14/6/92	
15	ASA–SBE 3–0; WALKOVER	BCB–NAC 1–2	PRM–BHU 1–0	DEK–DNO 2–1	DEK–DNO 2–1	PET–FCC 3–1; Adriano 87'	PHU–FHL 4–1	IHL–SAG 0–1	INT–PRI 2–2; Paciência 22' pen. Joãozinho 54'	BCB–NAC 1–2	PET–FCC 3–1; Patrick 17' 35'; Poulain 62'	PHU–FHL 4–1	INT–PRI 2–2; Neto 16'; Da Silva 35'	PRM–BHU 1–0	IHL–SAG 0–1; Luisão 36'	ASA–SBE 3–0; WALKOVER	
16	20/6/92	20/6/92	20/6/92	21/6/92	20/6/92	21/6/92	21/6/92	20/6/92	20/6/92	20/6/92	21/6/92	20/6/92	21/6/92	21/6/92	20/6/92	20/6/92	
16	ASA–DNO 2–1	BCB–BHU 1–2	BCB–BHU 1–2	FHL–DEK 2–0	ASA–DNO 2–1	PRM–FCC 7–0	FHL–DEK 2–0	NAC–IHL 1–0	SBE–INT 0–0	NAC–IHL 1–0	PET–PRI 0–1	PHU–SAG 2–0	PET–PRI 0–1	PRM–FCC 7–0	PHU–SAG 2–0	SBE–INT 0–0	
17	28/6/92	30/6/92	27/6/92	30/8/92	27/6/92	30/6/92	28/6/92	27/6/92	27/6/92	28/6/92	27/6/92	28/6/92	28/6/92	28/6/92	30/8/92	27/6/92	
17	FHL–ASA –	FCC–BCB 3–0; WALKOVER	BHU–IHL 4–1; Amadeu ' Cunha x2 Panzo '	SAG–DEK 2–1	DNO–SBE 0–0	FCC–BCB 3–0; WALKOVER	FHL–ASA –	BHU–IHL 4–1; Zé Manuel '	INT–PET –	PHU–NAC –	INT–PET –	PHU–NAC –	PRI–PRM –	PRI–PRM –	SAG–DEK 2–1	DNO–SBE 0–0	
18	6/7/92	5/7/92	5/7/92	6/7/92	5/7/92	5/7/92	6/7/92	5/7/92	5/7/92	6/7/92	5/7/92	5/7/92	5/7/92	5/7/92	6/7/92	6/7/92	
18	SAG–ASA 1–1	BCB–PRI 0–0	BHU–PHU 0–2	DEK–NAC 3–1	DNO–INT 2–2	IHL–FCC 4–0	SBE–FHL 4–0	IHL–FCC 4–0	DNO–INT 2–2	DEK–NAC 3–1	PRM–PET 0–0	BHU–PHU 0–2	BCB–PRI 0–0	PRM–PET 0–0	SAG–ASA 1–1	SBE–FHL 4–0	
19	12/7/92	12/7/92	11/7/92	11/7/92	12/7/92	12/7/92	12/7/92	11/7/92	11/7/92	12/7/92	12/7/92	12/7/92	11/7/92	11/7/92	11/7/92	11/7/92	
19	NAC–ASA 0–0	PET–BCB 3–0	DEK–BHU 3–0	DEK–BHU 3–0	FHL–DNO 1–1	FCC–PHU 2–1	FHL–DNO 1–1	IHL–PRI 2–1; Maianga 76'; Zé Manuel 84'	INT–PRM 0–4	NAC–ASA 0–0	PET–BCB 3–0; Amaral x2	FCC–PHU 2–1	IHL–PRI 2–1; Zacarias 90+2'	INT–PRM 0–4	SBE–SAG 0–0	SBE–SAG 0–0	
20	19/7/92	18/7/92	19/7/92	29/7/92	18/7/92	29/7/92	18/7/92	18/7/92	18/7/92	19/7/92	18/7/92	19/7/92	19/7/92	18/7/92	18/7/92	19/7/92	
20	ASA–BHU 0–0	PRM–BCB 8–0	ASA–BHU 0–0	FCC–DEK 0–1; Carlitos ' Filipe Nzanza ' Serginho 37'	SAG–DNO 0–1	FCC–DEK 0–1	INT–FHL 1–0	PET–IHL 4–1; Álvaro '	INT–FHL 1–0; Joãozinho 87'	NAC–SBE 1–2	PET–IHL 4–1; Amaral x2 Felito ' Nelo Bumba '	PRI–PHU 2–1; Valente 25'	PRI–PHU 2–1; Vieira Dias ' Zacarias '	PRM–BCB 8–0; Paulão x2 Seul x5	SAG–DNO 0–1	NAC–SBE 1–2	
21	26/7/92	30/7/92	25/7/92	25/7/92	26/7/92	26/7/92	25/7/92	26/7/92	30/7/92	26/7/92	26/7/92	26/7/92	25/7/92	26/7/92	25/7/92	25/7/92	
21	ASA–FCC 4–0	BCB–INT 1–1; Buro 22' pen.	BHU–SBE 2–0	DEK–PRI 1–1	NAC–DNO 0–1	ASA–FCC 4–0	FHL–SAG 3–1	IHL–PRM 1–4	BCB–INT 1–1	NAC–DNO 0–1	PHU–PET 1–2	PHU–PET 1–2	DEK–PRI 1–1; Vieira Dias '	IHL–PRM 1–4; Paulão x3 Seul '	FHL–SAG 3–1	BHU–SBE 2–0	
22	2/8/92	1/8/92	1/8/92	2/8/92	1/8/92	2/8/92	2/8/92	1/8/92	2/8/92	2/8/92	2/8/92	2/8/92	2/8/92	2/8/92	2/8/92	2/8/92	
22	ASA–PRI 2–2	BCB–IHL 2–1; Julião ' Poulain '	DNO–BHU 1–1; Aires 22'	DEK–PET 2–2	DNO–BHU 1–1; Pedro 88'	SBE–FCC 0–0	FHL–NAC 0–0	BCB–IHL 2–1; Marques 42'	INT–SAG 0–1; David 6'	FHL–NAC 0–0	DEK–PET 2–2	PHU–PRM 1–1	ASA–PRI 2–2; Bolefo ' pen.	PHU–PRM 1–1	INT–SAG 0–1	SBE–FCC 0–0	
23	9/8/92	8/8/92	9/8/92	9/8/92	9/8/92	9/8/92	9/8/92	9/8/92	9/8/92	8/8/92	9/8/92	8/8/92	8/8/92	9/8/92	8/8/92	8/8/92	
23	PET–ASA 1–1	PHU–BCB 3–0	BHU–FHL 3–1	PRM–DEK 1–0	FCC–DNO 1–0	FCC–DNO 1–0	BHU–FHL 3–1	IHL–INT 3–1	IHL–INT 3–1	SAG–NAC 3–0	PET–ASA 1–1	PHU–BCB 3–0	PRI–SBE 2–1; Corolla 72' pen. Ndisso 76'	PRM–DEK 1–0; Paulão '	SAG–NAC 3–0	PRI–SBE 2–1; Barros 64' pen.	
24	12/8/92	14/8/92	12/8/92	14/8/92	11/8/92	30/8/92	30/8/92	12/8/92	12/8/92	12/8/92	11/8/92	12/8/92	11/8/92	12/8/92	12/8/92	11/8/92	
24	ASA–PRM 1–0; Tandá 30'	DEK–BCB 2–1	BHU–SAG 1–0	DEK–BCB 2–1	PRI–DNO 2–1; Lito Tuia 28'	FCC–FHL 2–1	FCC–FHL 2–1	IHL–PHU 0–0	NAC–INT 0–0	NAC–INT 0–0	PET–SBE 1–0; Antoninho '	IHL–PHU 0–0	PRI–DNO 2–1; Muanza 7'; Zacarias 18'	ASA–PRM 1–0	BHU–SAG 1–0	PET–SBE 1–0	
25	16/8/92	16/8/92	15/8/92	16/8/92	16/8/92	16/8/92	16/8/92	16/8/92	15/8/92	15/8/92	16/8/92	15/8/92	16/8/92	16/8/92	16/8/92	16/8/92	
25	BCB–ASA 0–1	BCB–ASA 0–1	NAC–BHU 2–0	DEK–IHL 0–0	DNO–PET 0–1	SAG–FCC –	FHL–PRI 0–0	DEK–IHL 0–0	INT–PHU 1–0; Nelito 77' o.g.	NAC–BHU 2–0; Beto Carmelino 42'; Minhonha 55'	DNO–PET 0–1; Amaral '	INT–PHU 1–0	FHL–PRI 0–0	SBE–PRM 0–1	SAG–FCC –	SBE–PRM 0–1	
26	19/8/92	19/8/92	18/8/92	19/8/92	19/8/92	2/9/92	19/8/92	19/8/92	18/8/92	2/9/92	19/8/92	19/8/92	19/8/92	19/8/92	19/8/92	19/8/92	
26	ASA–IHL 0–0	BCB–SBE 1–0	BHU–INT 0–0	PHU–DEK 0–1	PRM–DNO 2–2	FCC–NAC 2–1	FHL–PET 1–1	ASA–IHL 0–0	BHU–INT 0–0	FCC–NAC 2–1	FHL–PET 1–1	PHU–DEK 0–1	SAG–PRI 1–1	PRM–DNO 2–2	SAG–PRI 1–1	BCB–SBE 1–0	
27	23/8/92	22/8/92	30/8/92	23/8/92	22/8/92	30/8/92	22/8/92	23/8/92	23/8/92	22/8/92	23/8/92	23/8/92	22/8/92	22/8/92	23/8/92	23/8/92	
27	PHU–ASA 1–1	DNO–BCB 2–1	FCC–BHU –	DEK–INT 2–1; Serginho '	DNO–BCB 2–1	FCC–BHU –	PRM–FHL 3–1	IHL–SBE 0–0	DEK–INT 2–1	PRI–NAC 2–0	PET–SAG 2–1; Amaral '	PHU–ASA 1–1	PRI–NAC 2–0; Muanza 2' ?	PRM–FHL 3–1; Seul '	PET–SAG 2–1	IHL–SBE 0–0	
28	12/9/92	29/8/92	13/9/92	12/9/92	12/9/92	10/9/92	29/8/92	12/9/92	10/9/92	12/9/92	12/9/92	12/9/92	13/9/92	12/9/92	12/9/92	12/9/92	
28	ASA–DEK 3–1	BCB–FHL 0–0	BHU–PRI 0–1	ASA–DEK 3–1	DNO–IHL 1–0	INT–FCC 0–2	BCB–FHL 0–0	DNO–IHL 1–0	INT–FCC 0–2	NAC–PET 0–1	NAC–PET 0–1	SBE–PHU 1–0	BHU–PRI 0–1	SAG–PRM 1–1	SAG–PRM 1–1	SBE–PHU 1–0	
29	5/9/92	5/9/92	6/9/92	5/9/92	5/9/92	6/9/92	5/9/92	5/9/92	5/9/92	6/9/92	6/9/92	5/9/92	6/9/92	6/9/92	5/9/92	5/9/92	
29	INT–ASA 1–1; Basse 56'	BCB–SAG 3–4	PET–BHU 2–0	DEK–SBE 0–0	PHU–DNO 2–0	PRI–FCC 4–1	IHL–FHL 0–1; Sousa 54'	IHL–FHL 0–1	INT–ASA 1–1; Mariano 41'	PRM–NAC 4–1	PET–BHU 2–0	PHU–DNO 2–0; Picas 15'; Lino ' pen.	PRI–FCC 4–1	PRM–NAC 4–1	BCB–SAG 3–4	DEK–SBE 0–0	
30	19/9/92	19/9/92	19/9/92	19/9/92	19/9/92	19/9/92	20/9/92	20/9/92	20/9/92	19/9/92	19/9/92	20/9/92	20/9/92	19/9/92	20/9/92	19/9/92	
30	SBE–ASA 1–2	NAC–BCB –	BHU–PRM 0–2	DNO–DEK 1–1; Inácio 89'	DNO–DEK 1–1	FCC–PET 2–1	FHL–PHU 0–1	SAG–IHL –	PRI–INT 3–2	NAC–BCB –	FCC–PET 2–1	FHL–PHU 0–1	PRI–INT 3–2	BHU–PRM 0–2	SAG–IHL –	SBE–ASA 1–2	
T																	

=== Top scorer ===
- (Angola) Amaral Aleixo

== Champions ==
1992 Girabola winner
Clube Desportivo Primeiro de Agosto
5th title

Squad: Barbosa, Bolefo, Corolla, Fuidimau, Ivo, Kiss, Loth, Mbila, Mwanza, Ndisso, Neto, Rabolé, Russo, Valentim, Velho, Vieira Dias, Zacarias, Zé Gordo
Head coach: Dušan Condić
