= 1990 Girabola =

Girabola 1990
- Season: 1990 (–)
- Champions: Petro Luanda
- Relegated: None
- 1991 African Cup of Champions Clubs: Petro Luanda (Girabola winner)
- Matches played: 182
- Top goalscorer: Mona (17 goals)

The 1990 Girabola was the 12th season of top-tier football competition in Angola. Atlético Petróleos de Luanda were the defending champions.

The league comprised 14 teams, none of which were relegated.

Petro de Luanda were crowned champions, winning their 7th title, and fifth in a row, while there were no relegations.

Mikayela Diakananwa aka Mona of Petro de Luanda finished as the top scorer with 17 goals.

Benfica do Huambo, formerly Mambroa, set an all time championship's record for most goals scored in a single match and for the largest goal-difference win in their 12-0 home win against Sassamba da Lunda Sul.

== Changes from the 1989 season ==
Promoted: None
Relegated: None

Locations of the 1990 Girabola teams

== League table ==
Pos	Team	Pld	W	D	L	GF	GA	GD	Pts	Qualification or relegation
1	Petro de Luanda (C)	26	19	4	3	61	21	+40	42	Qualification for Champions Cup
2	Primeiro de Maio	26	17	5	4	43	17	+26	39	
3	Primeiro de Agosto	26	13	9	4	38	20	+18	35	
4	Ferroviário da Huíla	22	11	6	5	39	34	+5	28	
5	Inter de Luanda (Note: Name later changed to Interclube)	26	9	7	10	26	29	−3	25	
6	Desportivo da EKA	26	12	2	12	37	36	+1	26	
7	Desportivo da Cuca	26	5	14	7	28	31	−3	24	
8	Mambroa	26	10	5	11	36	30	+6	25	
9	FC de Cabinda	26	5	14	7	26	27	−1	24	
10	Sagrada Esperança	26	7	11	8	34	34	0	25	
11	Sporting de Benguela	26	8	7	11	28	31	−3	23	
12	Petro do Huambo	26	6	8	12	21	26	−5	20	
13	Desportivo da TAAG (Note: Name later reverted to its original ASA)	27	5	9	13	24	36	−12	19	
14	Sassamba	0	0	0	0	0	0	0	0	

Updated to match(es) played on 22 November 1990. Source: Girabola.com
Rules for classification: 1) Points; 2) Head-to-head points; 3) Head-to-head goal difference; 4) Goal difference; 5) Goals scored; 6) Fair-play points; 7) Play-off.
(C) Champions

== Results ==
Home \ Away	DCU	DEK	DTA	FCC	FHL	INT	MAM	PET	PHU	PRI	PRM	SAG	SAS	SBE
Desportivo da Cuca	—		0–0	1–1	1–1	1–1	3–0	1–3	0–0	4–3	1–1	2–2	3–3	1–2
Desportivo da EKA	0–1	—	0–1	1–0	3–2	1–2	3–1	1–2	2–1	0–0	0–2	3–1	3–0 (Note: Desportivo da EKA was awarded a 3–0 win)	2–0
Desportivo da TAAG	1–0	1–0	—	1–1	1–2	0–0	0–3 (Note: Mambroa was awarded a 0–3 win)	1–5	0–1	0–1	1–1	1–3	4–1	2–0
FC de Cabinda	1–1	1–1	2–1	—	2–0	1–1	3–0	0–2	0–0	0–0	1–1	0–0		1–0
Ferroviário da Huíla	0–0	4–1	1–0	1–0	—	1–3	1–0	2–2	2–1	0–0	1–2	1–1	3–1	3–2
Inter de Luanda	1–2	3–2	1–0	0–0	0–4	—	1–1	0–1	2–0	0–2	0–1	2–1	5–2	0–1
Mambroa	2–1	3–1	0–3 (Note: Desportivo da TAAG was awarded a 0–3 win)	0–0	1–0	0–0	—	0–2		0–1	1–0	2–1	12–0	2–0
Petro de Luanda	2–0	3–2	2–2	3–0	3–1	2–0	2–1	—	5–0	3–1	0–0	2–2	4–0	4–1
Petro do Huambo	0–1		2–1	2–1	0–1	1–0	0–0	0–2	—	1–1		1–1	3–2	0–1
Primeiro de Agosto	0–0	2–1	1–1	3–2	2–0	1–2	3–2	1–0	1–0	—	0–1	2–2	2–2	2–1
Primeiro de Maio	2–0	2–0	1–0	2–1		2–0	2–0	3–0 (Note: Primeiro de Maio was awarded a 3–0 win)	0–0	1–2	—	3–0	4–0	1–0
Sagrada Esperança		0–1	1–0	1–1	1–1	0–0	–0	1–2	1–3	1–2	1–0	—		1–0
Sassamba	1–1	0–2	1–1		0–1	1–0	1–1	0–5	0–0	1–3	3–6	1–2	—	
Sporting de Benguela	1–1	0–1	1–1	3–3	3–0 (Note: Sporting de Benguela was awarded a 3–0 win)	0–1	4–0	1–0		2–2	2–1	0–0	1–1	—

Updated to match(es) played on 22 November 1990. Source: girabola.com
Legend: Blue = home team win; Yellow = draw; Red = away team win.

== Season statistics ==
=== Scorers ===
R/T
R/T	DCU	DEK	DTA	FCC	FHL	INT	MAM	PET	PHU	PRI	PRM	SAG	SAS	SBE	TOTAL
1	30/3/90	1/4/90	30/3/90	11/7/90	23/3/90	31/3/90	1/4/90	1/4/90	23/3/90	31/3/90	1/4/90	11/7/90	1/4/90	1/4/90	
1	DCU–DTA 0–0	MAM–DEK 3–1; Serginho '	DCU–DTA 0–0	SAG–FCC 1–1	FHL–PHU 2–1; Dinho ' Paulão '	INT–PRI 0–2	MAM–DEK 3–1; Panzo ' Rosário '	PET–PRM 0–0	FHL–PHU 2–1; Santos '	INT–PRI 0–2; Vieira Dias 48' pen. Manuel Martins 90'	PET–PRM 0–0	SAG–FCC 1–1	SBE–SAS 1–1; Zacarias '	SBE–SAS 1–1	
2	8/4/90	7/4/90	7/4/90	8/4/90	5/4/90	7/4/90	8/4/90	23/5/90	8/4/90	5/4/90	7/4/90	7/4/90	7/4/90	23/5/90	
2	FCC–DCU 1–1; Roque '	SAS–DEK 0–2	DTA–INT 0–0	FCC–DCU 1–1; Docas '	PRI–FHL 2–0	DTA–INT 0–0	PHU–MAM 0–0	SBE–PET 1–0	PHU–MAM 0–0	PRI–FHL 2–0; Vieira Dias 5'; Nelito Kwanza 90'	SAG–PRM 1–0	SAG–PRM 1–0; Quintino '	SAS–DEK 0–2	SBE–PET 1–0; Aníbal 72'	
3	15/4/90	14/4/90	19/4/90	15/4/90	19/4/90	15/4/90	15/4/90	17/4/90	14/4/90	15/4/90	15/4/90	14/4/90	17/4/90	14/4/90	
3	PRM–DCU 2–0	DEK–PHU 2–1	FHL–DTA 1–0	INT–FCC 0–0	FHL–DTA 1–0; Rico 53'	INT–FCC 0–0	MAM–PRI 0–1	PET–SAS 4–0	DEK–PHU 2–1; Júlio '	MAM–PRI 0–1; Ndisso '	PRM–DCU 2–0; Jeef ' Sarmento '	SAG–SBE 1–0; Amaral '	PET–SAS 4–0	SAG–SBE 1–0	
4		21/4/90	21/4/90			21/4/90	21/4/90	26/4/90		21/4/90	21/4/90	26/4/90			
4	SBE–DCU 1–1	DEK–PRI 0–0	DTA–MAM 0–3; WALKOVER	FCC–FHL 2–1	FCC–FHL 2–1	INT–PRM 0–1	DTA–MAM 0–3; WALKOVER	PET–SAG 2–2	PHU–SAS 3–2	DEK–PRI 0–0	INT–PRM 0–1	PET–SAG 2–2; Amaral '	PHU–SAS 3–2	SBE–DCU 1–1	
5		28/4/90	28/4/90	23/5/90			23/5/90		27/4/90	27/4/90		28/4/90	28/4/90		
5	DCU–PET 1–3	DTA–DEK 1–0	DTA–DEK 1–0; Basse '	MAM–FCC 0–0	FHL–PRM 1–2	SBE–INT 0–1	MAM–FCC 0–0	DCU–PET 1–3	PRI–PHU 1–0	PRI–PHU 1–0; Ndisso '	FHL–PRM 1–2	SAS–SAG 1–2	SAS–SAG 1–2	SBE–INT 0–1	
6	13/5/90	12/5/90	12/5/90	12/5/90	12/5/90	11/5/90	12/5/90	11/5/90	12/5/90	12/5/90	12/5/90	13/5/90	12/5/90	12/5/90	
6	DCU–SAG 2–2	FCC–DEK 2–0	PHU–DTA 2–1	FCC–DEK 2–0	FHL–SBE 3–2	PET–INT 2–0	PRM–MAM 2–0	PET–INT 2–0; Mona 70'; Ndunguidi ' pen.	PHU–DTA 2–1	PRI–SAS 2–2	PRM–MAM 2–0	DCU–SAG 2–2	PRI–SAS 2–2	FHL–SBE 3–2	
7	19/5/90	19/5/90	19/5/90	19/5/90	19/5/90	20/5/90	19/5/90	19/5/90	19/5/90	19/5/90	19/5/90	20/5/90	19/5/90	19/5/90	
7	SAS–DCU 1–1	DEK–PRM 0–2	PRI–DTA 1–1; Basse '	PHU–FCC 2–1	FHL–PET 2–2	INT–SAG 2–1	SBE–MAM 4–0	FHL–PET 2–2	PHU–FCC 2–1	PRI–DTA 1–1; Lucau '	DEK–PRM 0–2	INT–SAG 2–1; Amaral '	SAS–DCU 1–1	SBE–MAM 4–0	
8	27/5/90	2/6/90	26/5/90	4/7/90	27/5/90	27/5/90	27/5/90	27/5/90	26/5/90	4/7/90	26/5/90	27/5/90	26/5/90	2/6/90	
8	DCU–INT 1–1	DEK–SBE 2–0; Lito ' Pedro '	DTA–SAS 4–1; Basse 7' 13'; Corolla 11' 33'	FCC–PRI 0–0	SAG–FHL 1–1	DCU–INT 1–1	MAM–PET 0–2	MAM–PET 0–2	PRM–PHU 0–0	FCC–PRI 0–0	PRM–PHU 0–0	SAG–FHL 1–1	DTA–SAS 4–1; Rozy 33'	DEK–SBE 2–0	
9	9/6/90	10/6/90	9/6/90	9/6/90	9/6/90	9/6/90	9/6/90	10/6/90	9/6/90	10/6/90	10/6/90	9/6/90	9/6/90	9/6/90	
9	FHL–DCU 0–0	PET–DEK 3–2	DTA–FCC 1–1; Coreano '	DTA–FCC 1–1; Jesus '	FHL–DCU 0–0	SAS–INT 1–0	SAG–MAM 1–0	PET–DEK 3–2	PHU–SBE 0–1	PRM–PRI 1–2	PRM–PRI 1–2	SAG–MAM 1–0; Amaral '	SAS–INT 1–0; Paciência ' o.g.	PHU–SBE 0–1	
10	17/6/90	5/8/90	16/6/90	16/6/90	15/6/90	15/6/90	17/6/90	16/6/90	16/6/90	16/6/90	16/6/90	5/8/90	16/6/90	16/6/90	
10	DCU–MAM 3–0	SAG–DEK 0–1; Xaxão '	DTA–PRM 1–1	FCC–SAS 0–0	INT–FHL 0–4; Mavó 1'; Dinho 5'; Jaburú ' Mitó '	INT–FHL 0–4	DCU–MAM 3–0	PHU–PET 0–2; Mona '	PHU–PET 0–2	SBE–PRI 2–2	DTA–PRM 1–1	SAG–DEK 0–1	FCC–SAS 0–0	SBE–PRI 2–2	
11	28/6/90	28/6/90	20/6/90	20/6/90	20/6/90	21/6/90	21/6/90	20/6/90	8/8/90	20/6/90	20/6/90	8/8/90	20/6/90	20/6/90	
11	DEK–DCU 0–1	DEK–DCU 0–1	SBE–DTA 1–1	FCC–PRM 1–1	SAS–FHL 0–1	INT–MAM 1–1	INT–MAM 1–1	PRI–PET 1–0	PHU–SAG 1–1	PRI–PET 1–0; Vieira Dias 20' pen.	FCC–PRM 1–1	PHU–SAG 1–1	SAS–FHL 0–1	SBE–DTA 1–1	
12	22/6/90	24/6/90	23/6/90	23/6/90	23/6/90	24/6/90	23/6/90	23/6/90	22/6/90	23/6/90	23/6/90	23/6/90	23/6/90	23/6/90	
12	DCU–PHU 0–0	INT–DEK 3–2	PET–DTA 2–2; Basse 70'; Kansas '	FCC–SBE 1–0	MAM–FHL 1–0	INT–DEK 3–2	MAM–FHL 1–0	PET–DTA 2–2; Mona 4'; Ndunguidi 85' pen.	DCU–PHU 0–0	SAG–PRI 1–2	PRM–SAS 4–0	SAG–PRI 1–2	PRM–SAS 4–0	FCC–SBE 1–0	
13	1/7/90	30/6/90		30/6/90	30/6/90	4/7/90	21/7/90	30/6/90	4/7/90	1/7/90	30/6/90		21/7/90	30/6/90	
13	PRI–DCU 0–0	FHL–DEK 4–1	SAG–DTA 1–0	PET–FCC 3–0	FHL–DEK 4–1	PHU–INT 1–0	SAS–MAM 1–1	PET–FCC 3–0; Felito ' Luisinho ' Paulito '	PHU–INT 1–0; Picas '	PRI–DCU 0–0	PRM–SBE 1–0	SAG–DTA 1–0	SAS–MAM 1–1	PRM–SBE 1–0	
14	16/9/90	10/10/90	16/9/90	9/1/91		24/11/90	10/10/90	23/9/90		24/11/90	23/9/90	9/1/91			
14	DTA–DCU 1–0	DEK–MAM 3–1	DTA–DCU 1–0	FCC–SAG –	PHU–FHL 0–1	PRI–INT 1–2	DEK–MAM 3–1	PRM–PET 3–0; WALKOVER	PHU–FHL 0–1	PRI–INT 1–2	PRM–PET 3–0; WALKOVER	FCC–SAG –	SAS–SBE –	SAS–SBE –	
15	22/9/90	24/11/90	10/10/90	22/9/90	23/9/90	10/10/90	23/9/90		23/9/90	23/9/90	13/12/90	13/12/90	24/11/90		
15	DCU–FCC 1–1	DEK–SAS 3–0; WALKOVER	INT–DTA 1–0	DCU–FCC 1–1	FHL–PRI 0–0	INT–DTA 1–0	MAM–PHU –	PET–SBE 4–1	MAM–PHU –	FHL–PRI 0–0	PRM–SAG 3–0	PRM–SAG 3–0	DEK–SAS 3–0; WALKOVER	PET–SBE 4–1	
16	30/9/90	29/9/90	28/9/90	24/10/90	28/9/90	24/10/90	30/9/90	13/12/90	29/9/90	30/9/90	30/9/90	24/10/90	13/12/90	24/10/90	
16	DCU–PRM 1–1	PHU–DEK –	DTA–FHL 1–2	FCC–INT 1–1	DTA–FHL 1–2	FCC–INT 1–1	PRI–MAM 3–2	SAS–PET 0–5; Mona '	PHU–DEK –	PRI–MAM 3–2	DCU–PRM 1–1	SBE–SAG 0–0	SAS–PET 0–5	SBE–SAG 0–0	
17	3/10/90	2/10/90	24/10/90	1/12/90	1/12/90	14/11/90	24/10/90	1/12/90	3/10/90	2/10/90	14/11/90	1/12/90	3/10/90	3/10/90	
17	DCU–SBE 1–2	PRI–DEK 2–1; Xaxão 22'	MAM–DTA 0–3; WALKOVER	FHL–FCC 1–0	FHL–FCC 1–0	PRM–INT 2–0	MAM–DTA 0–3; WALKOVER	SAG–PET 1–2	SAS–PHU 0–0	PRI–DEK 2–1; Vieira Dias 18'; Bolefo 68'	PRM–INT 2–0	SAG–PET 1–2	SAS–PHU 0–0	DCU–SBE 1–2	
18	7/10/90	7/10/90	7/10/90	7/10/90	28/11/90	6/10/90	7/10/90	7/10/90	7/10/90	7/10/90	28/11/90	28/11/90	28/11/90	6/10/90	
18	PET–DCU 2–0	DEK–DTA 4–1	DEK–DTA 4–1	FCC–MAM 3–0	PRM–FHL –	INT–SBE 0–1	FCC–MAM 3–0	PET–DCU 2–0; Zequita ' o.g.	PHU–PRI 1–1	PHU–PRI 1–1	PRM–FHL –	SAG–SAS –	SAG–SAS –	INT–SBE 0–1; Babá '	
19		13/10/90	13/10/90	13/10/90		13/10/90	13/10/90	13/10/90	13/10/90	13/10/90	13/10/90		13/10/90		
19	SAG–DCU –	DEK–FCC 1–0	DTA–PHU 0–1	DEK–FCC 1–0	SBE–FHL 3–0; WALKOVER	INT–PET 0–1	MAM–PRM 1–0	INT–PET 0–1	DTA–PHU 0–1; Picas '	SAS–PRI 1–3	MAM–PRM 1–0	SAG–DCU –	SAS–PRI 1–3	SBE–FHL 3–0; WALKOVER	
20	21/10/90	21/10/90	20/10/90	20/10/90	25/11/90	5/1/91	11/11/90	25/11/90	20/10/90	20/10/90	21/10/90	5/1/91	21/10/90	11/11/90	
20	DCU–SAS 3–3	PRM–DEK 2–0	DTA–PRI 0–1	FCC–PHU 0–0	PET–FHL 3–1	SAG–INT 0–0	MAM–SBE 2–0	PET–FHL 3–1	FCC–PHU 0–0	DTA–PRI 0–1; Vieira Dias 66'	PRM–DEK 2–0	SAG–INT 0–0	DCU–SAS 3–3	MAM–SBE 2–0	
21	28/10/90	28/10/90	28/10/90	28/10/90	28/10/90	28/10/90	28/10/90	28/10/90	28/10/90	28/10/90	28/10/90	28/10/90	28/10/90	28/10/90	
21	INT–DCU 1–2	SBE–DEK 0–1	SAS–DTA 1–1	PRI–FCC 3–2	FHL–SAG 1–1	INT–DCU 1–2	PET–MAM 2–1	PET–MAM 2–1	PHU–PRM –	PRI–FCC 3–2; Vieira Dias x3	PHU–PRM –	FHL–SAG 1–1; Quintino '	SAS–DTA 1–1	SBE–DEK 0–1	
22	31/10/90	21/11/90	31/10/90	31/10/90	31/10/90	21/11/90	7/11/90	21/11/90	24/11/90	21/11/90	21/11/90	7/11/90	21/11/90	24/11/90	
22	DCU–FHL 1–1	DEK–PET 1–2; Lito 23'	FCC–DTA 1–1	FCC–DTA 1–1	DCU–FHL 1–1	INT–SAS 5–2	MAM–SAG 2–1	DEK–PET 1–2; Jesus 25'; Carlos Pedro 82'	SBE–PHU –	PRI–PRM 0–1	PRI–PRM 0–1; Jeef 30'	MAM–SAG 2–1	INT–SAS 5–2	SBE–PHU –	
23	3/11/90	3/11/90	4/11/90	5/1/91	3/11/90	3/11/90	3/11/90	3/11/90	3/11/90	4/11/90	4/11/90	3/11/90	5/1/91	4/11/90	
23	MAM–DCU 2–1	DEK–SAG 3–1	PRM–DTA 1–0	SAS–FCC –	FHL–INT 1–3	FHL–INT 1–3	MAM–DCU 2–1	PET–PHU 5–0; Carlos Pedro x2 Mona x2 Ndunguidi '	PET–PHU 5–0	PRI–SBE 2–1; Mbila 71'; Vieira Dias 90'	PRM–DTA 1–0; Kito 53'	DEK–SAG 3–1	SAS–FCC –	PRI–SBE 2–1; Nando 33'	
24	8/12/91	8/12/91	17/11/90	18/11/90	17/11/90	18/11/90	18/11/90	18/11/90	6/2/91	18/11/90	18/11/90	6/2/91	17/11/90	17/11/90	
24	DCU–DEK –	DCU–DEK –	DTA–SBE 2–0; Basse ' Duca '	PRM–FCC 2–1	FHL–SAS 3–1	MAM–INT 0–0	MAM–INT 0–0	PET–PRI 3–1; Mona 30' 87'; Luisinho 68'	SAG–PHU 1–3	PET–PRI 3–1; Bolefo 61'	PRM–FCC 2–1	SAG–PHU 1–3	FHL–SAS 3–1	DTA–SBE 2–0	
25	30/1/91	27/1/91	15/12/90	16/12/90	15/12/90	27/1/91	15/12/90	15/12/90	30/1/91	16/12/90	19/12/90	16/12/90	19/12/90	16/12/90	
25	PHU–DCU 0–1; Roque 53'	DEK–INT 1–2	DTA–PET 1–5; Pratas 80'	SBE–FCC 3–3	FHL–MAM 1–0	DEK–INT 1–2	FHL–MAM 1–0	DTA–PET 1–5; Mona 5' 42' 77'; Avelino 14'; André '	PHU–DCU 0–1	PRI–SAG 2–2; Vieira Dias '	SAS–PRM 3–6; Jeef x5	PRI–SAG 2–2	SAS–PRM 3–6	SBE–FCC 3–3	
26	22/12/90		22/12/90	22/12/90		22/12/90	22/12/90	22/12/90	22/12/90	22/12/90	22/12/90	22/12/90	22/12/90	22/12/90	
26	DCU–PRI 4–3	DEK–FHL 3–2	DTA–SAG 1–3	FCC–PET 0–2	DEK–FHL 3–2	INT–PHU 2–0	MAM–SAS 12–0	FCC–PET 0–2; Jesus x2	INT–PHU 2–0	DCU–PRI 4–3	SBE–PRM 2–1	DTA–SAG 1–3; Amaral x2	MAM–SAS 12–0	SBE–PRM 2–1	
T															

=== Top scorer ===
- (Angola) Mikayela Diakananwa Mona

== Champions ==
1990 Girabola winner
Atlético Petróleos de Luanda
7th title

Squad: André, Avelino, Bolingó, Bumba, Carlos Pedro, Duíndi, Esquerdinho, Felito, Gomes, Janguelito, Lúcio, Luisinho, Mona, Ndunguidi, Nianga, Orlando, Paulão, Paulito, Pinto, Quim Sebas, Ralph, Rasgado, Valentim, Wilson
Head coach: Carlos Queirós
