= Ian Bakala =

Zambian footballer (born 1980)

- Born: 1 November 1980 (age 45)
- Occupation: Footballer.
- Known for: Played for the Zambian

Ian Bakala (born 1 November 1980) is a Zambian former footballer.

== International career ==
The midfielder was part of the Zambian 2006 African Nations Cup team, who finished third in group C in the first round of competition, thus failing to secure qualification for the quarter-finals. He also took part at the 1999 FIFA World Youth Championship. He was a member of the Zambia National team that played at the 2002 Africa Cup of Nations in Mali

== Managerial career ==
In 2025, Bakala was appointed coach of Zimbabwean club CAPS United in September 2025. He was moved to assistant coach following the appointment of Takesure Chiragwi in November 2025.

== Clubs ==
- 2001–2003: (Zambia) Kabwe Warriors
- 2003–2004: (Belgium) K.F.C. Germinal Beerschot
- 2004–2005: (Zimbabwe) CAPS United FC
- 2006–2008: (Angola) Primeiro de Agosto
- 2009: (Angola) Kabuscorp Sport Clube do Palanca
- 2010–2012 (Angola) Progresso Sambizanga
- 2014: (Angola) - União Sport Clube do Uíge
