= 1991 Girabola =

Girabola 1991
- Season: 1991 (–)
- Champions: 1º de Agosto
- Relegated: Desp Cuca; Desp Saurimo
- 1992 African Cup of Champions Clubs: 1º de Agosto (Girabola winner)
- 1992 CAF Cup: Sagrada (Girabola runner-up)
- Matches played: 240
- Top goalscorer: Amaral (23 goals)

The 1991 Girabola was the 13th season of top-tier football competition in Angola. Atlético Petróleos de Luanda were the defending champions.

The league comprised 16 teams, the bottom two of which were relegated.

Primeiro de Agosto were crowned champions, winning their 4th title, while Desportivo da Cuca and Desportivo de Saurimo were relegated.

Amaral Aleixo of Sagrada Esperança finished as the top scorer with 23 goals.

== Changes from the 1990 season ==
Relegated: None
Promoted: Benfica de Cabinda, Nacional Benguela

Locations of the 1991 Girabola teams

== League table ==
Pos	Team	Pld	W	D	L	GF	GA	GD	Pts	Qualification or relegation
1	Primeiro de Agosto (C)	27	17	6	4	56	26	+30	40	Qualification for Champions Cup
2	Sagrada Esperança	24	14	7	3	46	25	+21	35	Qualification for CAF Cup
3	Petro de Luanda	26	12	10	4	36	18	+18	34	
4	Primeiro de Maio	26	12	8	6	46	27	+19	32	
5	Petro do Huambo	29	10	9	10	26	28	−2	29	
6	Nacional de Benguela	28	11	6	11	40	37	+3	28	
7	Desportivo da EKA	26	10	7	9	32	37	−5	27	
8	FC de Cabinda	25	8	9	8	23	28	−5	25	
9	Benfica de Cabinda	28	6	11	11	31	39	−8	23	
10	Ferroviário da Huíla	25	9	5	11	22	30	−8	23	
11	Desportivo da TAAG (Note: Name later reverted to its original ASA)	29	8	7	14	33	43	−10	23	
12	Inter de Luanda (Note: Name later changed to Interclube)	27	6	11	10	25	35	−10	23	
13	Sporting de Benguela	27	5	12	10	37	39	−2	22	
14	Benfica do Huambo	25	6	10	9	26	35	−9	22	
15	Desportivo da Cuca (R)	27	5	10	12	30	45	−15	20	Relegation to Provincial stages
16	Desportivo de Saurimo (R)	23	5	6	12	27	44	−17	16	Relegation to Provincial stages

Updated to match(es) played on 22 November 1991. Source: Girabola.com
Rules for classification: 1) Points; 2) Head-to-head points; 3) Head-to-head goal difference; 4) Goal difference; 5) Goals scored; 6) Fair-play points; 7) Play-off.
(C) Champions; (R) Relegated

== Results ==
Home \ Away	BCB	BHU	DCU	DEK	DSA	DTA	FCC	FHL	INT	NAC	PET	PHU	PRI	PRM	SAG	SBE
Benfica de Cabinda	—	5–1	2–2	1–1	0–0	0–2	0–0	1–0	1–0	3–0		0–1	2–3		0–0	2–2
Benfica do Huambo	4–1	—	1–2	2–1	3–0	1–0		0–0	1–1	3–0		0–2	1–0			1–1
Desportivo da Cuca	2–0	1–1	—	2–1		0–0	1–2	1–1	2–1	1–4	0–0	0–1	0–2	1–2	1–3	2–2
Desportivo da EKA	2–0	1–1		—	2–0	3–1	3–0 (Note: Desportivo da EKA was awarded a 3–0 win)	1–0	1–1	1–0	1–1	1–0	0–1	2–1		
Desportivo de Saurimo	1–1	1–1	1–3		—	2–1						1–0	1–2	1–0	1–0	2–3
Desportivo da TAAG	2–0	6–2	1–1	1–2	1–4	—	1–2	2–2	3–1	1–1	0–2		0–5	0–1	1–2	2–1
FC de Cabinda	1–2	2–0	1–0	2–1	1–0	2–0	—	2–2	0–1	1–1	1–1	1–1	0–1	1–4	0–0	2–0
Ferroviário da Huíla	2–0	2–0		1–0	3–1	0–1	1–1	—		1–0	1–0	1–0	1–4		0–3 (Note: Sagrada Esperança was awarded a 3–0 win)	1–0
Inter de Luanda	1–2	2–0	2–2	0–1	2–2	2–0	0–0	2–1	—	0–2	0–0	1–0	1–1	0–0	0–4	1–0
Nacional de Benguela	4–3	0–0	2–2	4–1	3–2	3–0	3–1	0–1	2–1	—	0–0	1–2	0–3	0–1		2–0
Petro de Luanda	1–1	1–0	3–2	1–1	3–0	1–2	2–0	1–1	3–1	3–2	—	3–0	1–0	3–0	1–2	1–0
Petro do Huambo	0–0	2–2	2–1	2–0	0–0	0–0	0–0	1–0	2–2	1–0	0–2	—	1–2	0–1	1–2	1–1
Primeiro de Agosto	2–0	0–0	2–0	5–1	5–3	1–0		3–2		2–2	1–1	2–3	—	2–2	1–0	3–0
Primeiro de Maio	1–1	1–1	5–1	6–0	5–1	1–1		2–0	3–0	1–3	0–0	1–2	2–1	—	3–2	1–1
Sagrada Esperança	2–1		3–0 (Note: Sagrada Esperança was awarded a 3–0 win)	3–2	3–1	2–2			0–0	2–0	2–1	1–1	2–2	1–0	—	4–3
Sporting de Benguela	2–2	3–0	0–0	1–1	1–1	0–2	3–0	4–0	2–2	0–1		2–0		2–2	3–3	—

Updated to match(es) played on 22 November 1991. Source: girabola.com
Legend: Blue = home team win; Yellow = draw; Red = away team win.

== Season statistics ==
=== Scorers ===
R/T
R/T	BCB	BHU	DCU	DEK	DSA	DTA	FCC	FHL	INT	NAC	PET	PHU	PRI	PRM	SAG	SBE	TOTAL
1	24/3/91	24/3/91	24/3/91		12/5/91	24/3/91		10/8/91	23/3/91	24/3/91	23/3/91	24/3/91	12/5/91	12/6/91	10/8/91	12/6/91	
1	NAC–BCB 4–3	BHU–PHU 0–2	DTA–DCU 1–1	DEK–FCC 3–0; WALKOVER	PRI–DSA 5–3	DTA–DCU 1–1	DEK–FCC 3–0; WALKOVER	SAG–FHL –	INT–PET 0–0	NAC–BCB 4–3; Beto Carmelino x3	INT–PET 0–0	BHU–PHU 0–2; Basse ' Geovetty '	PRI–DSA 5–3	SBE–PRM 2–2; Brandão ' Paulão '	SAG–FHL –	SBE–PRM 2–2; Enoque x2	
2	27/3/91	20/7/91	30/3/91	30/3/91	5/6/91	30/3/91	7/7/91	27/3/91	27/3/91	5/6/91	26/3/91	30/3/91	7/7/91	27/3/91	20/7/91	26/3/91	
2	PRM–BCB 1–1	SAG–BHU –	DCU–DEK 2–1; Kepe x2	DCU–DEK 2–1; Xaxão '	NAC–DSA 3–2	PHU–DTA 0–0	FCC–PRI 0–1	INT–FHL 2–1; Jonas '	INT–FHL 2–1; Bebé ' Túbia '	NAC–DSA 3–2	PET–SBE 1–0; Mona 48'	PHU–DTA 0–0	FCC–PRI 0–1	PRM–BCB 1–1; Jeef '	SAG–BHU –	PET–SBE 1–0	
3	4/7/91	5/4/91	6/4/91	22/5/91	4/7/91	24/4/91	7/4/91	7/4/91	5/4/91	7/4/91	7/4/91	22/5/91	6/4/91	7/4/91	24/4/91	7/4/91	
3	BCB–DSA 0–0	INT–BHU 2–0	PRI–DCU 2–0	DEK–PHU 1–0	BCB–DSA 0–0	DTA–SAG 1–2	NAC–FCC 3–1	FHL–SBE 1–0; Mavó '	INT–BHU 2–0; Bebeto ' Túbia '	NAC–FCC 3–1	PET–PRM 3–0; André ' Ndunguidi ' Paulito '	DEK–PHU 1–0	PRI–DCU 2–0; M.Fuidimau 86' 87'	PET–PRM 3–0	DTA–SAG 1–2	FHL–SBE 1–0	
4	13/4/91	19/6/91	10/4/91	13/4/91	4/8/91	13/4/91	20/7/91	13/4/91	13/4/91	13/4/91	4/8/91	13/4/91	19/6/91	20/7/91	13/4/91	10/4/91	
4	BCB–SAG 0–0	PRI–BHU 0–0	DCU–SBE 2–2	DEK–DTA 3–1; Serginho x2	DSA–PET –	DEK–DTA 3–1	PRM–FCC –	FHL–NAC 1–0	PHU–INT 2–2	FHL–NAC 1–0	DSA–PET –	PHU–INT 2–2	PRI–BHU 0–0	PRM–FCC –	BCB–SAG 0–0	DCU–SBE 2–2	
5	22/4/91	21/4/91	21/4/91	14/7/91	14/7/91	22/5/91	22/5/91	10/7/91	22/4/91	20/4/91	21/4/91	10/7/91	20/4/91	22/4/91	21/4/91	22/4/91	
5	SBE–BCB 2–2	BHU–DCU 1–2	BHU–DCU 1–2	DSA–DEK –	DSA–DEK –	FCC–DTA 1–0	FCC–DTA 1–0; Cláudio 29'	PHU–FHL 1–0	PRM–INT 3–0	PRI–NAC 2–2; Minhas ' pen. Chico I 90'	PET–SAG 1–2	PHU–FHL 1–0	PRI–NAC 2–2; Lucau ' Muanza '	PRM–INT 3–0	PET–SAG 1–2	SBE–BCB 2–2	
6	25/4/91	6/7/91	25/4/91	28/4/91	28/4/91	3/7/91	4/7/91	6/7/91	28/4/91	28/4/91	3/7/91	4/7/91	4/8/91	28/4/91	28/4/91	4/8/91	
6	DCU–BCB 2–0	BHU–FHL 0–0	DCU–BCB 2–0	DEK–PRM 2–1	DSA–SAG 1–0	DTA–PET 0–2	FCC–PHU 1–1	BHU–FHL 0–0	INT–NAC 0–2	INT–NAC 0–2; Beto Carmelino ' Chico I '	DTA–PET 0–2; Luisinho 5'; Jesus 8'	FCC–PHU 1–1	SBE–PRI –	DEK–PRM 2–1	DSA–SAG 1–0	SBE–PRI –	
7	5/5/91	14/7/91	21/7/91	4/5/91	5/5/91	5/5/91	14/7/91	21/7/91	5/5/91	4/5/91	5/5/91	5/5/91	5/5/91	7/7/91	7/7/91	5/5/91	
7	BCB–PRI 2–3	BHU–FCC –	FHL–DCU –	NAC–DEK 4–1	DTA–DSA 1–4	DTA–DSA 1–4	BHU–FCC –	FHL–DCU –	SBE–INT 2–2	NAC–DEK 4–1; Chico I 14'; Minhas 15'; Arlindo 59'; Minguito 78'	PHU–PET 0–2	PHU–PET 0–2	BCB–PRI 2–3; Ndisso x3	SAG–PRM 1–0	SAG–PRM 1–0	SBE–INT 2–2	
8	10/7/91	12/5/91	11/5/91	10/7/91	7/8/91	8/5/91	10/8/91	7/8/91	11/5/91	12/5/91	10/8/91	12/5/91	8/5/91	11/5/91	11/5/91	12/5/91	
8	DEK–BCB 2–0	NAC–BHU 0–0	DCU–PRM 1–2; Kepe ' pen.	DEK–BCB 2–0	DSA–FHL –	DTA–PRI 0–5	FCC–PET 1–1; Adriano 24'	DSA–FHL –	SAG–INT 0–0	NAC–BHU 0–0	FCC–PET 1–1; Ndunguidi 28'	PHU–SBE 1–1	DTA–PRI 0–5; Lucau ' Muanza x2 Ndisso x2	DCU–PRM 1–2; Jorgito 4'; Bebeto ' o.g.	SAG–INT 0–0	PHU–SBE 1–1	
9	19/5/91	19/5/91	18/5/91	19/5/91	18/5/91	19/5/91	18/5/91	18/5/91	18/5/91	19/5/91	19/5/91	29/5/91	18/5/91	18/5/91	29/5/91	18/5/91	
9	BCB–DTA 0–2	DEK–BHU 1–1	INT–DCU 2–2	DEK–BHU 1–1	PRM–DSA 5–1	BCB–DTA 0–2	FCC–SBE 2–0	PRI–FHL 3–2	INT–DCU 2–2	PET–NAC 3–2	PET–NAC 3–2; Ndunguidi '	SAG–PHU 1–1; Picas 28'	PRI–FHL 3–2	PRM–DSA 5–1	SAG–PHU 1–1; Amaral 18'	FCC–SBE 2–0	
10	5/6/91	5/6/91	26/5/91	5/6/91	25/5/91	26/5/91	25/5/91	26/5/91	25/5/91	25/5/91	5/6/91	26/5/91	26/5/91	26/5/91	25/5/91	25/5/91	
10	BHU–BCB 4–1	BHU–BCB 4–1	DCU–PHU 0–1	PET–DEK 1–1	INT–DSA 2–2; Borges ' Castelo 20'	FHL–DTA 0–1	FCC–SAG 0–0	FHL–DTA 0–1	INT–DSA 2–2; Bebeto 12'; Pandy '	NAC–SBE 2–0; Beto Carmelino ' Chico I	PET–DEK 1–1	DCU–PHU 0–1	PRM–PRI 2–1; Ndisso '	PRM–PRI 2–1; Jorgito x2	FCC–SAG 0–0	NAC–SBE 2–0	
11	2/6/91	1/6/91	3/8/91	2/6/91	1/6/91	1/6/91	1/6/91	2/6/91	1/6/91	2/6/91	20/7/91	2/6/91	20/7/91	2/6/91	3/8/91	1/6/91	
11	PHU–BCB 0–0	BHU–DTA 1–0	DCU–SAG 1–3; Kepe '	FHL–DEK 1–0	SBE–DSA 1–1	BHU–DTA 1–0	FCC–INT 0–1	FHL–DEK 1–0	FCC–INT 0–1	NAC–PRM 0–1	PRI–PET 1–1; Ndunguidi '	PHU–BCB 0–0	PRI–PET 1–1; Ndisso '	NAC–PRM 0–1	DCU–SAG 1–3; Amaral ' Esquerdinho ' Joãozinho '	SBE–DSA 1–1	
12	9/6/91	8/6/91	9/6/91	9/6/91	9/6/91	9/6/91	9/6/91	9/6/91	9/6/91	9/6/91	9/6/91	9/6/91	9/6/91	8/6/91	9/6/91	9/6/91	
12	BCB–FCC 0–0	PRM–BHU 1–1; Rosário 17'	DSA–DCU 1–3	DEK–INT 1–1	DSA–DCU 1–3	SBE–DTA 0–2	BCB–FCC 0–0	FHL–PET 1–0	DEK–INT 1–1	PHU–NAC 1–0	FHL–PET 1–0	PHU–NAC 1–0	PRI–SAG 1–0	PRM–BHU 1–1; Jeef 42'	PRI–SAG 1–0	SBE–DTA 0–2	
13	16/6/91	16/6/91	14/6/91	16/6/91	16/6/91	15/6/91	16/6/91	16/6/91	16/6/91	15/6/91	14/6/91	16/6/91	16/6/91	16/6/91	15/6/91	15/6/91	
13	BCB–INT 1–0	DSA–BHU 1–1	PET–DCU 3–2; Kubala 58'; Kepe 88'	PRI–DEK 5–1	DSA–BHU 1–1	DTA–NAC 1–1	FHL–FCC 1–1	FHL–FCC 1–1	BCB–INT 1–0	DTA–NAC 1–1	PET–DCU 3–2; Jesus 53' 59'; Paulito '	PRM–PHU 1–2	PRI–DEK 5–1	PRM–PHU 1–2	SBE–SAG 3–3	SBE–SAG 3–3	
14	23/6/91	22/6/91	19/6/91	23/6/91	23/6/91	22/6/91	19/6/91	23/6/91	23/6/91	23/6/91	22/6/91	23/6/91	23/6/91	22/6/91	23/6/91	23/6/91	
14	BCB–FHL 1–0	PET–BHU 1–0	DCU–FCC 1–2	DEK–SBE –	DSA–PHU 1–0	DTA–PRM 0–1	DCU–FCC 1–2	BCB–FHL 1–0	INT–PRI 1–1	SAG–NAC 2–0	PET–BHU 1–0	DSA–PHU 1–0	INT–PRI 1–1	DTA–PRM 0–1	SAG–NAC 2–0	DEK–SBE –	
15	30/6/91	30/6/91	27/6/91	30/6/91	29/6/91	26/6/91	29/6/91	30/6/91	26/6/91	27/6/91	30/6/91	29/6/91	29/6/91	30/6/91	30/6/91	30/6/91	
15	PET–BCB 1–1	BHU–SBE 1–1	DCU–NAC 1–4; Zé Pedro '	SAG–DEK 3–2	FCC–DSA 2–1	INT–DTA 2–0	FCC–DSA 2–1	PRM–FHL 2–0	INT–DTA 2–0; Jesus 6'; Bebeto '	DCU–NAC 1–4; Chico I ' Chico II x2 Minhas '	PET–BCB 1–1	PRI–PHU 2–3	PRI–PHU 2–3	PRM–FHL 2–0	SAG–DEK 1–2	BHU–SBE 1–1	
16	18/8/91	18/8/91	17/8/91	14/8/91	18/8/91	17/8/91	14/8/91	17/8/91	21/8/91	18/8/91	21/8/91	18/8/91	18/8/91	18/8/91	17/8/91	18/8/91	
16	BCB–NAC 3–0	PHU–BHU 2–2	DCU–DTA 0–0	FCC–DEK 2–2; Serginho 30'; Luyeye 79' pen.	DSA–PRI 1–2	DCU–DTA 0–0	FCC–DEK 2–2	FHL–SAG 0–3; WALKOVER	PET–INT 3–1; Paulo 30'	BCB–NAC 3–0	PET–INT 3–1; Avelino ' Ndunguidi 35'; Paulito '	PHU–BHU 2–2	DSA–PRI 1–2	PRM–SBE 1–1	FHL–SAG 0–3; WALKOVER	PRM–SBE 1–1	
17																	
17	BCB–PRM –	BHU–SAG –	DEK–DCU –	DEK–DCU –	DSA–NAC –	DTA–PHU –	PRI–FCC –	FHL–INT –	FHL–INT –	DSA–NAC –	SBE–PET –	DTA–PHU –	PRI–FCC –	BCB–PRM –	BHU–SAG –	SBE–PET –	
18	1/9/91	1/9/91	1/9/91	31/8/91	1/9/91	31/8/91	21/8/91	31/8/91	1/9/91	21/8/91	1/9/91	31/8/91	1/9/91	1/9/91	31/8/91	31/8/91	
18	DSA–BCB 1–1	BHU–INT 1–1	DCU–PRI 0–2	PHU–DEK 2–0	DSA–BCB 1–1	SAG–DTA 2–2	FCC–NAC 1–1; Roberto '	SBE–FHL 4–0	BHU–INT 1–1	FCC–NAC 1–1; Chico I '	PRM–PET 0–0	PHU–DEK 2–0; Nelito 4' pen. Luís Bento '	DCU–PRI 0–2	PRM–PET 0–0	SAG–DTA 2–2	SBE–FHL 4–0; Aníbal ' Broa ' Enoque x2	
19	7/9/91	8/9/91	8/9/91	7/9/91	8/9/91	7/9/91	8/9/91	4/9/91	7/9/91	4/9/91	8/9/91	7/9/91	8/9/91	8/9/91	7/9/91	8/9/91	
19	SAG–BCB 2–1	BHU–PRI 1–0; Serginho 48'	SBE–DCU 0–0	DTA–DEK 1–2	PET–DSA 3–0	DTA–DEK 1–2	FCC–PRM 1–4	NAC–FHL 0–1	INT–PHU 1–0; David 75'	NAC–FHL 0–1	PET–DSA 3–0	INT–PHU 1–0	BHU–PRI 1–0	FCC–PRM 1–4	SAG–BCB 2–1	SBE–DCU 0–0	
20	16/10/91	14/9/91	14/9/91	15/9/91	15/9/91	15/9/91	15/9/91	14/9/91	11/9/91	15/9/91	14/9/91	14/9/91	15/9/91	11/9/91	14/9/91	16/10/91	
20	BCB–SBE 2–2	DCU–BHU 1–1	DCU–BHU 1–1	DEK–DSA 2–0	DEK–DSA 2–0	DTA–FCC 1–2	DTA–FCC 1–2	FHL–PHU 1–0	INT–PRM 0–0	NAC–PRI 0–3	SAG–PET 2–1	FHL–PHU 1–0	NAC–PRI 0–3; Loth ' Mbila ' Muanza '	INT–PRM 0–0	SAG–PET 2–1	BCB–SBE 2–2	
21	18/9/91	18/9/91	18/9/91	18/9/91	18/9/91	19/9/91	18/9/91	18/9/91	19/9/91	19/9/91	19/9/91	18/9/91	18/9/91	18/9/91	18/9/91	18/9/91	
21	BCB–DCU 2–2	FHL–BHU 2–0	BCB–DCU 2–2	PRM–DEK 6–0	SAG–DSA 3–1	PET–DTA 1–2	PHU–FCC 0–0	FHL–BHU 2–0	NAC–INT 2–1	NAC–INT 2–1	PET–DTA 1–2	PHU–FCC 0–0	PRI–SBE 3–0	PRM–DEK 6–0	SAG–DSA 3–1	PRI–SBE 3–0	
22	29/9/91	28/9/91	29/9/91	29/9/91	28/9/91	28/9/91	28/9/91	29/9/91	29/9/91	29/9/91	28/9/91	28/9/91	29/9/91	28/9/91	28/9/91	29/9/91	
22	PRI–BCB 2–0	FCC–BHU 2–0	DCU–FHL 1–1	DEK–NAC 1–0	DSA–DTA 2–1	DSA–DTA 2–1	FCC–BHU 2–0	DCU–FHL 1–1	INT–SBE 1–0	DEK–NAC 1–0	PET–PHU 3–0	PET–PHU 3–0	PRI–BCB 2–0	PRM–SAG 3–2	PRM–SAG 3–2	INT–SBE 1–0	
23	5/10/91	6/10/91	6/10/91	5/10/91	6/10/91	5/10/91	6/10/91	6/10/91	5/10/91	6/10/91	6/10/91	5/10/91	5/10/91	6/10/91	5/10/91	5/10/91	
23	BCB–DEK 1–1	BHU–NAC 3–0	PRM–DCU 5–1	BCB–DEK 1–1	FHL–DSA 3–1	PRI–DTA 1–0	PET–FCC 2–0	FHL–DSA 3–1	INT–SAG 0–4	BHU–NAC 3–0	PET–FCC 2–0	SBE–PHU 2–0	PRI–DTA 1–0	PRM–DCU 5–1	INT–SAG 0–4	SBE–PHU 2–0	
24	9/10/91	9/10/91	10/10/91	9/10/91	2/11/91	9/10/91	9/10/91	9/10/91	10/10/91	10/10/91	10/10/91	10/10/91	9/10/91	2/11/91	10/10/91	9/10/91	
24	DTA–BCB 2–0	BHU–DEK 2–1	DCU–INT 2–1	BHU–DEK 2–1	DSA–PRM 1–0	DTA–BCB 2–0; Kossi 15'; Bravo da Rosa 33'	SBE–FCC 3–0	FHL–PRI 1–4	DCU–INT 2–1	NAC–PET 0–0	NAC–PET 0–0	PHU–SAG 1–2	FHL–PRI 1–4; Mateus Fuidimau ' Ndisso x3	DSA–PRM 1–0	PHU–SAG 1–2; Amaral 47'	SBE–FCC 3–0	
25	2/10/91	13/10/91	13/10/91	13/10/91		12/10/91	2/11/91	12/10/91		13/10/91	13/10/91	2/10/91	13/10/91	13/10/91	2/11/91	13/10/91	
25	BCB–BHU 5–1	BCB–BHU 5–1	PHU–DCU 2–1	DEK–PET 1–1	DSA–INT –	DTA–FHL 2–2	SAG–FCC –	DTA–FHL 2–2	DSA–INT –	SBE–NAC 0–1	DEK–PET 1–1	PHU–DCU 2–1	PRI–PRM 2–2; Muanza 2'; Ndisso '	PRI–PRM 2–2	SAG–FCC –	SBE–NAC 0–1	
26	19/10/91	19/10/91	19/10/91	19/10/91	21/10/91	19/10/91	17/10/91	19/10/91	17/10/91	20/10/91	20/10/91	19/10/91	20/10/91	20/10/91	19/10/91	21/10/91	
26	BCB–PHU 0–1	DTA–BHU 6–2; Rosário ' Rui '	SAG–DCU 3–0; WALKOVER	DEK–FHL 1–0; Luyeye '	DSA–SBE 2–3	DTA–BHU 6–2; Kifuma ' Kossi ' Manuel ' Nzinga ' Pepé ' Tek '	INT–FCC 0–0	DEK–FHL 1–0	INT–FCC 0–0	PRM–NAC 1–3	PET–PRI 1–0	BCB–PHU 0–1	PET–PRI 1–0	PRM–NAC 1–3	SAG–DCU 3–0; WALKOVER	DSA–SBE 2–3	
27	26/10/91	27/10/91		27/10/91		26/10/91	26/10/91	27/10/91	27/10/91	26/10/91	27/10/91	26/10/91	26/10/91	27/10/91	26/10/91	26/10/91	
27	FCC–BCB 1–2; Julião x2	BHU–PRM –	DCU–DSA –	INT–DEK 0–1	DCU–DSA –	DTA–SBE 2–1	FCC–BCB 1–2; Adriano '	PET–FHL 1–1	INT–DEK 0–1	NAC–PHU 1–2; Beto Carmelino '	PET–FHL 1–1	NAC–PHU 1–2; Basse ' Luís Bento '	SAG–PRI 2–2; Neto 29'; Bolefo 58'	BHU–PRM –	SAG–PRI 2–2; Amaral 44'; Joãozinho 57'	DTA–SBE 2–1	
28	30/10/91	31/10/91	30/10/91	30/10/91	31/10/91	30/10/91	30/10/91	30/10/91	30/10/91	30/10/91	30/10/91	30/10/91	30/10/91	30/10/91	23/10/91	23/10/91	
28	INT–BCB 1–2	BHU–DSA 3–0	DCU–PET 0–0	DEK–PRI 0–1	BHU–DSA 3–0	NAC–DTA 3–0	FCC–FHL 2–0	FCC–FHL 2–0	INT–BCB 1–2	NAC–DTA 3–0	DCU–PET 0–0	PHU–PRM 0–1	DEK–PRI 0–1	PHU–PRM 0–1	SAG–SBE 4–3	SAG–SBE 4–3	
29	6/11/91	7/11/91	6/11/91	6/11/91	6/11/91	6/11/91	6/11/91	6/11/91	7/11/91	7/11/91	7/11/91	6/11/91	7/11/91	6/11/91	7/11/91	6/11/91	
29	FHL–BCB 2–0	BHU–PET –	FCC–DCU 1–0	SBE–DEK 1–1	PHU–DSA 0–0	PRM–DTA 1–1	FCC–DCU 1–0	FHL–BCB 2–0	PRI–INT –	NAC–SAG –	BHU–PET –	PHU–DSA 0–0	PRI–INT –	PRM–DTA 1–1	NAC–SAG –	SBE–DEK 1–1	
30	23/11/91	23/11/91	23/11/91	23/11/91	23/11/91	23/11/91	23/11/91	23/11/91	23/11/91	23/11/91	23/11/91	23/11/91	23/11/91	23/11/91	23/11/91	23/11/91	
30	BCB–PET –	SBE–BHU 3–0	NAC–DCU 2–2	DEK–SAG –	DSA–FCC –	DTA–INT 3–1	DSA–FCC –	FHL–PRM –	DTA–INT 3–1	NAC–DCU 2–2	BCB–PET –	PHU–PRI 1–2	PHU–PRI 1–2	FHL–PRM –	DEK–SAG –	SBE–BHU 3–0	
T																	

=== Top scorer ===
- (Angola) Amaral Aleixo

== Champions ==
1991 Girabola winner
Clube Desportivo Primeiro de Agosto
4th title

Squad: Arsénio, Barbosa, Bolefo, Fuidimau, Ivo, Kiss, Loth, Lucau, Mbila, Mwanza, Ndisso, Nelo, Neto, Ntomas, Rabolé, Russo, Valentim, Vieira Dias, Zé Gordo
Head coach: Dušan Condić
