= Takesure Chiragwi =

Zimbabwean footballer)

Takesure Chiragwi is a Zimbabwean football manager and former footballer who manages Caps United FC

== Early life ==
Chiragi played for Zimbabwean side CAPS United. He helped the club win the league.

== Career ==
Chiragi managed Zimbabwean side Ngezi Platinum. He helped the club win the league.

== Personal life ==
Chiragi was born in Zimbabwe. He has been nicknamed "Deco" after Portugal international Deco.
