= Desportivo da EKA =

Angolan football club

Desportivo da Eka
- Full name: Desportivo da Eka
- Ground: Estádio do Inferno, Angola
- Chairman: Evaristo Pires

Desportivo da Eka is an Angolan football club based in the town of Dondo, Kwanza Norte in north Angola.

The club is attached and named after Angola's brewery EKA (Empresa Angolana de Cervejas, SARL).

== Stadium ==
Desportivo da Eka's home stadium is nicknamed Inferno do Dondo (Dondo's Hell).

== Manager history and performance ==
Season	Coach	L2	L1	C	Coach	L2	L1	C
1989	(Angola) Napoleão Brandão							
1990	(Mozambique) José Pérides				(Angola) Zé do Pau			
1991	(Angola) Zé do Pau				(Angola) Manico			
1992	(Angola) Manico				(Angola) Manuel Sarmento			
1993	(Angola) João Machado							
1994	(Angola) João Machado							
