= 1981 Girabola =

Angolan football season

Girabola 1981
- Season: 1981 (9/5/1981–7/2/1982)
- Champions: 1º de Agosto
- Relegated: Desp Chela; FC Uíge; Ferroviário; Petro Huambo
- 1982 African Cup of Champions Clubs: 1º de Agosto (Girabola winner)
- 1982 African Cup Winners' Cup: TAAG (Girabola runner-up)
- Matches: 182
- Goals: 432 (2.37 per match)
- Top goalscorer: Joseph Maluka (20 goals)

The 1981 Girabola was the third season of top-tier football competition in Angola. The season ran from 9 May 1981 to 7 February 1982.

The league comprised 14 teams, the bottom three of which were relegated.

Primeiro de Agosto were the defending champions and were crowned champions, winning their 3rd title, while Desportivo da Chela, FC do Uíge, Ferroviário da Huíla and Petro do Huambo were relegated.

Joseph Maluka of Primeiro de Maio finished as the top scorer with 20 goals.

== Changes from the 1980 season ==
Diabos Verdes were renamed as Leões de Luanda.
Relegated: Palancas do Huambo, Sagrada Esperança, Sassamba da LS, Welwitschia
Promoted: Petro de Luanda, Petro do Huambo, Primeiro de Maio, Progresso do Sambizanga

== Legal disputes ==
Leões de Luanda won a claim against Petro de Luanda for the latter fielding ineligible player João Machado (he was supposed to be suspended for a double yellow card) in their first leg match for the 8th round played on July 11. Petro had originally won the game by 2-1. As a result, Leões were awarded 2 pts and Petro subsequently forfeited 2 pts.

In another case, the so-called Caso Rafael, in which Leões de Luanda fielded an ineligible player named Rafael, Leões de Luanda forfeited a total five points and was therefore relegated. Subsequently, all clubs involved in games where such player took part were awarded the lost points as follows: Mambroa (2 pts), FC Uíge (2 pts) and Desportivo da Chela (1 pt).

In another dispute, Desportivo da Chela was awarded 1 point as a result of the so-called Caso Felix, in its claim against Ferroviário da Huíla. Subsequently, Ferroviário forfeited 1 pt.

Locations of the 1981 Girabola teams

== League table ==
| Pos | Team | Pld | W | D | L | GF | GA | GD | Pts | Qualification or relegation |
|---|---|---|---|---|---|---|---|---|---|---|
| 1 | Primeiro de Agosto (C) | 26 | 16 | 6 | 4 | 40 | 15 | +25 | 38 | Qualification for Champions Cup |
| 2 | Desportivo da TAAG (Note: Name later reverted to its original ASA) | 26 | 13 | 10 | 3 | 43 | 19 | +24 | 36 | Qualification for Cup Winners' Cup |
| 3 | Mambroa (Note: Name later reverted to its original Benfica do Huambo) | 26 | 12 | 9 | 5 | 38 | 24 | +14 | 33 | |
| 4 | Progresso do Sambizanga | 26 | 13 | 4 | 9 | 31 | 26 | +5 | 30 | |
| 5 | Académica do Lobito | 26 | 10 | 7 | 9 | 25 | 27 | −2 | 27 | |
| 6 | Construtores do Uíge | 26 | 10 | 6 | 10 | 38 | 38 | 0 | 26 | |
| 7 | Petro de Luanda | 26 | 8 | 9 | 9 | 37 | 35 | +2 | 25 | |
| 8 | Primeiro de Maio | 26 | 8 | 9 | 9 | 34 | 36 | −2 | 25 | |
| 9 | Nacional de Benguela | 26 | 7 | 11 | 8 | 24 | 24 | 0 | 25 | |
| 10 | Leões de Luanda (Note: Name later reverted to its original Sporting de Luanda) | 26 | 7 | 10 | 9 | 24 | 23 | +1 | 24 | |
| 11 | Petro do Huambo (R) | 26 | 7 | 9 | 10 | 24 | 30 | −6 | 23 | Relegation to Provincial stages |
| 12 | Desportivo da Chela (Note: Name later reverted to its original Benfica do Lubango) (R) | 26 | 7 | 8 | 11 | 26 | 32 | −6 | 22 | Relegation to Provincial stages |
| 13 | FC do Uíge (R) | 26 | 6 | 9 | 11 | 28 | 38 | −10 | 21 | Relegation to Provincial stages |
| 14 | Ferroviário da Huíla (R) | 26 | 4 | 1 | 21 | 18 | 53 | −35 | 9 | Relegation to Provincial stages |

Updated to match(es) played on 22 November 1981. Source: Girabola.com
Rules for classification: 1) Points; 2) Head-to-head points; 3) Head-to-head goal difference; 4) Goal difference; 5) Goals scored; 6) Fair-play points; 7) Play-off.
(C) Champions; (R) Relegated

== Results ==
| Home \ Away | ACA | COU | DCH | DTA | FCU | FHL | LEO | MAM | NAC | PET | PHU | PRI | PRM | PRO |
|---|---|---|---|---|---|---|---|---|---|---|---|---|---|---|
| Académica do Lobito | — | 1–3 | 1–0 | 0–0 | 1–0 | 2–1 | 0–0 | 2–3 | 1–0 | 2–0 | 1–0 | 0–3 | 2–0 | 0–1 |
| Construtores do Uíge | 1–1 | — | 1–0 | 1–3 | 4–1 | 0–1 | 5–1 | 1–1 | 1–1 | 2–1 | 1–2 | 1–0 | 2–2 | 1–1 |
| Desportivo da Chela | 1–1 | 1–3 | — | 0–2 | 3–0 | 2–0 | 0–0 | 0–1 | 3–1 | 2–2 | 1–1 | 0–1 | 3–3 | 1–0 |
| Desportivo da Taag | 0–0 | 1–2 | 2–1 | — | 1–1 | 4–0 | 2–0 | 1–1 | 1–0 | 2–2 | 2–0 | 2–3 | 3–0 | 1–2 |
| FC do Uíge | 1–0 | 1–0 | 0–1 | 1–5 | — | 5–0 | 0–0 | 2–2 | 1–1 | 3–3 | 0–1 | 0–2 | 0–3 | 1–2 |
| Ferroviário da Huíla | 1–3 | 1–2 | 1–1 | 0–1 | 1–2 | — | 1–0 | 0–2 | 0–2 | 2–4 | 3–2 | 1–1 | 1–4 | 0–3 |
| Leões de Luanda | 0–2 | 0–0 | 3–0 | 1–1 | 1–0 | 3–2 | — | 3–1 | 1–3 | 1–0 | 3–3 | 0–1 | 0–1 | 1–1 |
| Mambroa | 4–1 | 3–4 | 1–1 | 0–0 | 1–0 | 3–0 | 2–0 | — | 1–0 | 2–3 | 1–0 | 1–0 | 3–0 | 2–1 |
| Nacional de Benguela | 0–0 | 2–0 | 3–1 | 0–1 | 1–1 | 2–0 | 1–1 | 0–0 | — | 1–1 | 0–0 | 0–2 | 0–0 | 2–1 |
| Petro de Luanda | 1–1 | 3–0 | 3–2 | 2–2 | 0–1 | 1–2 | 0–3 | 1–1 | 2–0 | — | 1–0 | 0–2 | 3–2 | 1–2 |
| Petro do Huambo | 1–2 | 4–1 | 0–1 | 0–1 | 1–1 | 1–0 | 1–1 | 1–1 | 1–1 | 0–0 | — | 0–0 | 1–0 | 1–0 |
| Primeiro de Agosto | 3–0 | 2–1 | 0–0 | 1–1 | 2–2 | 1–0 | 0–1 | 2–1 | 2–0 | 0–1 | 3–0 | — | 0–0 | 3–0 |
| Primeiro de Maio | 2–1 | 4–1 | 2–1 | 1–1 | 1–1 | 2–0 | 1–1 | 1–0 | 1–1 | 1–1 | 2–3 | 1–3 | — | 0–2 |
| Progresso do Sambizanga | 1–0 | 1–0 | 0–0 | 0–3 | 1–3 | 1–0 | 2–1 | 0–0 | 1–2 | 1–0 | 3–0 | 2–3 | 0–2 | — |

Updated to match(es) played on 7 February 1982. Source: girabola.com
Legend: Blue = home team win; Yellow = draw; Red = away team win.

== Season Statistics ==
=== Scorers ===
R/T
| R/T | ACA | COU | DCH | DTA | FCU | FHL | LEO | MAM | NAC | PET | PHU | PRI | PRM | PRO | TOTAL |
|---|---|---|---|---|---|---|---|---|---|---|---|---|---|---|---|
| 1 | 10/5/81 | 10/5/81 | 9/5/81 | 10/5/81 | 10/5/81 | 10/5/81 | 10/5/81 | 10/5/81 | 10/5/81 | 9/5/81 | 10/5/81 | 10/5/81 | 9/5/81 | 9/5/81 | |
| 1 | FCU–ACA 1–0 | FHL–COU 1–2 | PRO–DCH 0–0 | PHU–DTA 0–1; Ndisso ' | FCU–ACA 1–0; Armindo 15' | FHL–COU 1–2 | PRI–LEO 0–1; Loth 28' | NAC–MAM 0–0 | NAC–MAM 0–0 | PET–PRM 3–2; Abreu 1'; Jesus 55' 90' | PHU–DTA 0–1 | PRI–LEO 0–1 | PET–PRM 3–2; Maluka 70' 72' | PRO–DCH 0–0 | 11 |
| 2 | 17/5/81 | 16/5/81 | 17/5/81 | 17/5/81 | 17/5/81 | 17/5/81 | 16/5/81 | 17/5/81 | 17/5/81 | 17/5/81 | 17/5/81 | 17/5/81 | 16/5/81 | 16/5/81 | |
| 2 | DCH–ACA 1–1 | PRM–COU 4–1; Nimy ' | DCH–ACA 1–1 | DTA–PRI 2–3; Ndisso 8'; Luntadila 64' | FCU–MAM 2–2; Armindo x2 | PHU–FHL 1–0 | PRO–LEO 2–1; Mané 69' | FCU–MAM 2–2; Julião x2 | NAC–PET 1–1; Sansão ' | NAC–PET 1–1; Oliveira 36' | PHU–FHL 1–0; Santiago 16' | DTA–PRI 2–3; Alves 55'; Ndunguidi ' Nsuka 73' | PRM–COU 4–1; Maluka 14' 37' 42' 50' | PRO–LEO 2–1; Nando 24'; Tobias 45' | 22 |
| 3 | 24/5/81 | 24/5/81 | | 24/5/81 | 23/5/81 | 24/5/81 | 24/5/81 | | 24/5/81 | 23/5/81 | 24/5/81 | 24/5/81 | 24/5/81 | 24/5/81 | |
| 3 | ACA–PRO 0–1 | COU–NAC 1–1; Zumbele 10' | MAM–DCH 1–1; Zé Amaro 6' | DTA–LEO 2–0; Ed.Machado 17'; Luntadila 38' | PET–FCU 0–1; Mário 31' | FHL–PRI 1–1; Tozé 80' | DTA–LEO 2–0 | MAM–DCH 1–1; Julião 15' | COU–NAC 1–1; Leandro 16' | PET–FCU 0–1 | PRM–PHU 2–3; Santiago 1' 3' 65' | FHL–PRI 1–1; Ndunguidi 85' | PRM–PHU 2–3; Maluka 11'; Juca 36' | ACA–PRO 0–1; Deny ' | 15 |
| 4 | 30/5/81 | 31/5/81 | 31/5/81 | 30/5/81 | 31/5/81 | 30/5/81 | 30/5/81 | 31/5/81 | 31/5/81 | 31/5/81 | 31/5/81 | 31/5/81 | 31/5/81 | 31/5/81 | |
| 4 | LEO–ACA 0–2; Mateus 23'; Arnaldo 63' pen. | FCU–COU 1–0 | DCH–PET 2–2; Lucas ' Mateus ' | DTA–FHL 4–0; Gonçalves 5'; Ed.Machado 73' ? Zola ' | FCU–COU 1–0; Armindo 53' | DTA–FHL 4–0 | LEO–ACA 0–2 | MAM–PRO 2–1; Marques 25'; Julião 30' | NAC–PHU 0–0 | DCH–PET 2–2; Lito ' Macuéria 49' | NAC–PHU 0–0 | PRI–PRM 1–1 | PRI–PRM 1–1 | MAM–PRO 2–1; V. Dias 45' pen. | 16 |
| 5 | 7/6/81 | 7/6/81 | 7/6/81 | 7/6/81 | 7/6/81 | 7/6/81 | 7/6/81 | 7/6/81 | 7/6/81 | 6/6/81 | 7/6/81 | 7/6/81 | 7/6/81 | 6/6/81 | |
| 5 | ACA–MAM 2–3; Arnaldo 32' 65' | COU–DCH 1–0; Vicy 87' | COU–DCH 1–0 | PRM–DTA 1–1 | PHU–FCU 1–1; Armindo 4' | FHL–LEO 1–0; Tomás 16' | FHL–LEO 1–0 | ACA–MAM 2–3; Julião pen. Maria 48' o.g. ' | PRI–NAC 2–0 | PRO–PET 1–0 | PHU–FCU 1–1; Saavedra 14' | PRI–NAC 2–0; Dinis 36'; Amândio 85' | PRM–DTA 1–1; Lunguila 36' | PRO–PET 1–0; Vieira Dias ' | 14 |
| 6 | 13/6/81 | 14/6/81 | 14/6/81 | 14/6/81 | 13/6/81 | 14/6/81 | 14/6/81 | 14/6/81 | 14/6/81 | 13/6/81 | 14/6/81 | 13/6/81 | 14/6/81 | 14/6/81 | |
| 6 | PET–ACA 1–1 | COU–PRO 1–1 | DCH–PHU 1–1; Brás 85' | DTA–NAC 1–0; Geovety | PRI–FCU 2–2; Simão 8'; Lito 16' | PRM–FHL 2–0 | MAM–LEO 2–0; Maria 62'; Firmino 80' | MAM–LEO 2–0 | DTA–NAC 1–0 | PET–ACA 1–1 | DCH–PHU 1–1; Detoni 60' | PRI–FCU 2–2; Alves 35' 70' | PRM–FHL 2–0; Daniel ' Maluka 76' | COU–PRO 1–1 | 15 |
| 7 | 5/7/81 | 5/7/81 | 5/7/81 | 5/7/81 | 5/7/81 | 5/7/81 | 4/7/81 | 5/7/81 | 5/7/81 | 5/7/81 | 5/7/81 | 5/7/81 | 4/7/81 | 5/7/81 | |
| 7 | ACA–COU 1–3; Arnaldo 90' | ACA–COU 1–3; Vicy 3' ? Marco 42' | DCH–PRI 0–1 | FCU–DTA 1–5; Ed.Machado 38' 40'; Gonçalves 60'; Geovety 69'; Juca 73' | FCU–DTA 1–5; Armindo 78' | NAC–FHL 2–0 | LEO–PRM 0–1 | MAM–PET 2–3; Julião ' | NAC–FHL 2–0; Sansão x2 | MAM–PET 2–3; Jesus x2 Macuéria ' | PRO–PHU 3–0 | DCH–PRI 0–1; Tandu 72' | LEO–PRM 0–1; Daniel 80' | PRO–PHU 3–0 | 22 |
| 8 | 12/7/81 | 12/7/81 | 11/7/81 | 11/7/81 | 12/7/81 | 12/7/81 | 11/7/81 | 12/7/81 | 12/7/81 | 11/7/81 | 12/7/81 | 12/7/81 | 12/7/81 | 12/7/81 | |
| 8 | PHU–ACA 1–2 | COU–MAM 1–1 | DTA–DCH 2–1 | DTA–DCH 2–1 | FHL–FCU 1–2; Armindo 25' ? pen. | FHL–FCU 1–2; Miguel ' | PET–LEO 0–3 | COU–MAM 1–1 | PRM–NAC 1–1 | PET–LEO 0–3 | PHU–ACA 1–2 | PRI–PRO 3–0 | PRM–NAC 1–1 | PRI–PRO 3–0 | 19 |
| 9 | 19/7/81 | 18/7/81 | 19/7/81 | 19/7/81 | 19/7/81 | 19/7/81 | 18/7/81 | 19/7/81 | 18/7/81 | 18/7/81 | 19/7/81 | 19/7/81 | 19/7/81 | 19/7/81 | |
| 9 | ACA–PRI 0–3 | PET–COU 3–0 | FHL–DCH 1–1; Basílio 23' | PRO–DTA 0–3; Luntadila 15'; Ed. Machado 37'; Geovety 80' pen. | FCU–PRM 0–3 | FHL–DCH 1–1; Miguel Antunes 75' | LEO–NAC 1–3; Loth 1' | MAM–PHU 1–0 | LEO–NAC 1–3; Alcídes 43'; Sansão 55' 85' | PET–COU 3–0; Jesus 10' 60'; Afonso 79' | MAM–PHU 1–0 | ACA–PRI 0–3 | FCU–PRM 0–3; Maluka 41' 87'; Daniel 62' | PRO–DTA 0–3 | 19 |
| 10 | 12/9/81 | 13/9/81 | 12/9/81 | 12/9/81 | 13/9/81 | 13/9/81 | 13/9/81 | 13/9/81 | 13/9/81 | 13/9/81 | 13/9/81 | 13/9/81 | 12/9/81 | 13/9/81 | |
| 10 | DTA–ACA 0–0 | COU–LEO 5–1; Vicy 8' 34' 80'; Kuzieme ' Tex 68' | PRM–DCH 2–1; Dias ' | DTA–ACA 0–0 | NAC–FCU 1–1; Arménio 81' | FHL–PRO 0–3 | COU–LEO 5–1; Dianingana 50' | PRI–MAM 2–1; Mascarenhas 67' | NAC–FCU 1–1; Sansão 70' | PHU–PET 0–0 | PHU–PET 0–0 | PRI–MAM 2–1; Tandu 32'; Ivo 81' | PRM–DCH 2–1; Daniel ' Maluka 36' | FHL–PRO 0–3; Sto António ' Vieira Dias 39' | 17 |
| 11 | 20/9/81 | 20/9/81 | 20/9/81 | 20/9/81 | 19/9/81 | 20/9/81 | 19/9/81 | 20/9/81 | 20/9/81 | 20/9/81 | 20/9/81 | 20/9/81 | 19/9/81 | 19/9/81 | |
| 11 | ACA–FHL 2–1; Mateus ' Tomás ' | COU–PHU 1–2 | DCH–NAC 3–1; Lucas ' Basílio 40'; Zé Amaro 58' | MAM–DTA 0–0 | LEO–FCU 1–0 | ACA–FHL 2–1; Rodrigues ' | LEO–FCU 1–0; Matos 7' | MAM–DTA 0–0 | DCH–NAC 3–1; Sansão 43' | PET–PRI 0–2 | COU–PHU1–2 | PET–PRI 0–2; Alves 30' 42' | PRO–PRM 2–0 | PRO–PRM 2–0; Vieira Dias 30'; Zandú 85' | 15 |
| 12 | 26/9/81 | 26/9/81 | 27/9/81 | 27/9/81 | 27/9/81 | 27/9/81 | 27/9/81 | 27/9/81 | 27/9/81 | 27/9/81 | 27/9/81 | 26/9/81 | 26/9/81 | 27/9/81 | |
| 12 | PRM–ACA 2–1; Arnaldo ' | PRI–COU 2–1; Massaca 18' | FCU–DCH 0–1; Basílio 43' | DTA–PET 2–2; Ed.Machado 38' 90+1' | FCU–DCH 0–1 | FHL–MAM 0–2 | PHU–LEO 1–1; Diamantino 57' | FHL–MAM 0–2; Jorge 14'; Arlindo 25' | NAC–PRO 2–1; Alcídes ' Nelson ' | DTA–PET 2–2; César 45'; J.Machado 90+9' | PHU–LEO 1–1; Américo 12' | PRI–COU 2–1; Alves 35' 76' | PRM–ACA 2–1; Maluka 44' pen. 47' | NAC–PRO 2–1; Dé ' | 18 |
| 13 | 4/10/81 | 4/10/81 | 4/10/81 | 4/10/81 | 4/10/81 | 3/10/81 | 4/10/81 | 3/10/81 | 4/10/81 | 3/10/81 | 4/10/81 | 4/10/81 | 3/10/81 | 4/10/81 | |
| 13 | ACA–NAC 1–0 | COU–DTA 1–3 | DCH–LEO 0–0 | COU–DTA 1–3 | PRO–FCU 1–3 | PET–FHL 1–2; Canhoto 11' pen. Simões 41' | DCH–LEO 0–0 | PRM–MAM 1–0 | ACA–NAC 1–0 | PET–FHL 1–2; J.Machado 9' | PHU–PRI 0–0 | PHU–PRI 0–0 | PRM–MAM 1–0; Daniel 2' | PRO–FCU 1–3 | 13 |
| 14 | 11/10/81 | 11/10/81 | 11/10/81 | 11/10/81 | 11/10/81 | 11/10/81 | 11/10/81 | 11/10/81 | 11/10/81 | 11/10/81 | 11/10/81 | 11/10/81 | 11/10/81 | 11/10/81 | |
| 14 | ACA–FCU 1–0; Jindungo 7' | COU–FHL 0–1 | DCH–PRO 1–0; Basílio ' | DTA–PHU 2–0; Luntadila 36' | ACA–FCU 1–0 | COU–FHL 0–1 | LEO–PRI 0–1 | MAM–NAC 1–0; Santana 33' | MAM–NAC 1–0 | PRM–PET 1–1; Jesus 21' | DTA–PHU 2–0 | LEO–PRI 0–1; Alves 45' | PRM–PET 1–1; Juca 3' | DCH–PRO 1–0 | 9 |
| 15 | 18/10/81 | 18/10/81 | 18/10/81 | 18/10/81 | 18/10/81 | 18/10/81 | 17/10/81 | 18/10/81 | 17/10/81 | 17/10/81 | 18/10/81 | 18/10/81 | 18/10/81 | 17/10/81 | |
| 15 | ACA–DCH 1–0; Arnaldo ' | COU–PRM 2–2; Vicy 25' 70' | ACA–DCH 1–0 | PRI–DTA 1–1; Ed.Machado 79' | MAM–FCU 1–0 | FHL–PHU 3–2; Tomás 35'; Canhoto 37' pen. Emílio 73' | LEO–PRO 1–1; Vieira Dias 73' | MAM–FCU 1–0; Jorge 23' | PET–NAC 2–0 | PET–NAC 2–0; J.Machado ' Lito ' | FHL–PHU 3–2; Saavedra 19'; Santiago 30' | PRI–DTA 1–1; Amândio 90' | COU–PRM 2–2; Maluka 11'; J.Gregório 88' | LEO–PRO 1–1; Vieira Dias ' | 17 |
| 16 | 25/10/81 | 8/11/81 | 25/10/81 | 10/11/81 | 25/10/81 | 24/10/81 | 10/11/81 | 25/10/81 | 8/11/81 | 25/10/81 | 25/10/81 | 24/10/81 | 25/10/81 | 25/10/81 | |
| 16 | PRO–ACA 1–0 | NAC–COU 2–0 | DCH–MAM 0–1 | LEO–DTA 1–1; Luntadila ' | FCU–PET 3–3; Armindo 32'; Mavó 42'; Raimundo 75' | PRI–FHL 1–0 | LEO–DTA 1–1; Franco ' | DCH–MAM 0–1; Maria 45' | NAC–COU 2–0 | FCU–PET 3–3; J.Machado 36'; Pepé 47'; Jesus 48' | PHU–PRM 1–0; Saavedra 4' | PRI–FHL 1–0; Tandu 20' | PHU–PRM 1–0 | PRO–ACA 1–0; Praia 80' | 14 |
| 17 | 15/11/81 | 15/11/81 | 14/11/81 | 15/11/81 | 15/11/81 | 15/11/81 | 15/11/81 | 15/11/81 | 15/11/81 | 14/11/81 | 15/11/81 | 15/11/81 | 15/11/81 | 15/11/81 | |
| 17 | ACA–LEO O–O | COU–FCU 4–1 | PET–DCH 3–2; Lucas 4' | FHL–DTA 0–1; Juca ' | COU–FCU 4–1 | FHL–DTA 0–1 | ACA–LEO 0–0 | PRO–MAM 0–0 | PHU–NAC 1–1; Alcídes 85' | PET–DCH 3–2; Santos 17'; Jesus 25' | PHU–NAC 1–1; Américo 48' | PRM–PRI 0–3; Alves 16'; Nsuka 36'; Barros 82' | PRM–PRI 0–3 | PRO–MAM 0–0 | 16 |
| 18 | 22/11/81 | 22/11/81 | 22/11/81 | 21/11/81 | 22/11/81 | 21/11/81 | 21/11/81 | 22/11/81 | 22/11/81 | 22/11/81 | 22/11/81 | 22/11/81 | 21/11/81 | 22/11/81 | |
| 18 | MAM–ACA 4–1; Luís o.g. | DCH–COU 1–3; Vicy 22'; Nimy 35' 41' | DCH–COU 1–3; Pepé 44' pen. | DTA–PRM 3–0; Luntadila 8'; Ed.Machado 43' 79' | FCU–PHU 0–1 | LEO–FHL 3–2; Barbosa ' Paiva 55' | LEO–FHL 3–2; Loth ' Mané 65' pen. Vieira Dias ' | MAM–ACA 4–1; Ralph 9'; Julião 45' 82'; Marques 74' | NAC–PRI 0–2 | PET–PRO 1–2; Jesus 87' pen. | FCU–PHU 0–1; Lilas ' | NAC–PRI 0–2; Ndunguidi 23'; Alves 90' | DTA–PRM 3–0 | PET–PRO 1–2; Abreu 20' 75' | 23 |
| 19 | | 28/11/81 | 29/11/81 | 29/11/81 | 29/11/81 | 29/11/81 | 29/11/81 | 29/11/81 | 29/11/81 | | 29/11/81 | 29/11/81 | 29/11/81 | 28/11/81 | |
| 19 | ACA–PET 2–0 | PRO–COU 1–0 | PHU–DCH 0–1; Lucas 71' | NAC–DTA 0–1; Ed.Machado 44' | FCU–PRI 0–2 | FHL–PRM 1–4; Barbosa ' pen. | LEO–MAM 3–1; Diamantino 26'; Loth ' Mané | LEO–MAM 3–1; Ralph 22' | NAC–DTA 0–1 | ACA–PET 2–0 | PHU–DCH 0–1 | FCU–PRI 0–2; Zeca 28'; Alves 70' | FHL–PRM 1–4; Sarmento 47'; Juca 77'; Maluka 85' | PRO–COU 1–0; Dé 44' | 16 |
| 20 | 6/12/81 | 6/12/81 | 31/1/82 | 5/12/81 | 5/12/81 | 6/12/81 | 6/12/81 | 6/12/81 | 6/12/81 | 6/12/81 | 6/12/81 | 31/1/82 | 6/12/81 | 6/12/81 | |
| 20 | COU–ACA 1–1 | COU–ACA 1–1 | PRI–DCH 0–0 | DTA–FCU 1–1; Geovety ' | DTA–FCU 1–1; Monasseis 36' | FHL–NAC 0–2 | PRM–LEO 1–1; Dianingana 43' | PET–MAM 1–1; Paulinho 84' | FHL–NAC 0–2 | PET–MAM 1–1; Tony 25' o.g. | PHU–PRO 1–0; Américo 16' | PRI–DCH 0–0 | PRM–LEO 1–1; Maluka ' | PHU–PRO 1–0 | 11 |
| 21 | 13/12/81 | 13/12/81 | 13/12/81 | 13/12/81 | 13/12/81 | 13/12/81 | 13/12/81 | 13/12/81 | 13/12/81 | 13/12/81 | 13/12/81 | 13/1/82 | 13/12/81 | 13/1/82 | |
| 21 | ACA–PHU 1–0; Sayombo ' | MAM–COU 3–4; Zumbele x2 José 57'; Vicy 84' | DCH–DTA 0–2 | DCH–DTA 0–2 | FCU–FHL 5–0 | FCU–FHL 5–0 | LEO–PET 1–0; Vieira Dias ' | MAM–COU 3–4; Arlindo ' Jorge ' Marques 89' | NAC–PRM 0–0 | LEO–PET 1–0 | ACA–PHU 1–0 | PRO–PRI 2–3; Alves 6' 58'; Ndunguidi 18' pen. | NAC–PRM 0–0 | PRO–PRI 2–3; Praia ' Vieira Dias ' | 21 |
| 22 | 19/12/80 | 20/12/81 | 3/1/82 | 20/12/81 | 19/12/80 | 3/1/82 | 20/12/81 | 20/12/81 | 20/12/81 | 20/12/81 | 20/12/81 | 19/12/80 | 19/12/80 | 20/12/81 | |
| 22 | PRI–ACA 3–0 | COU–PET 2–1; Nimy 1'; Indú 51' | DCH–FHL 2–0; Ndala 4'; Brás ' pen. | DTA–PRO 1–2; Jujú 37' | PRM–FCU 1–1; Arménio 73' | DCH–FHL 2–0 | NAC–LEO 1–1; Vieira Dias 27' | PHU–MAM 1–1 | NAC–LEO 1–1; Samuel 17' | COU–PET 2–1; Lito 30' | PHU–MAM 1–1 | PRI–ACA 3–0; Ndunguidi 9'; Nsuka 17' 29' | PRM–FCU 1–1; Maluka 83' pen. | DTA–PRO 1–2; Abreu 82'; Vieira Dias 84' | 17 |
| 23 | 10/1/82 | 9/1/82 | 10/1/82 | 10/1/82 | 10/1/82 | 10/1/82 | 9/1/82 | 10/1/82 | 10/1/82 | 9/1/82 | 9/1/82 | 10/1/82 | 10/1/82 | 10/1/82 | |
| 23 | ACA–DTA 0–0 | LEO–COU 0–0 | DCH–PRM 3–3; Basílio 27'; Ndala ' | ACA–DTA 0–0 | FCU–NAC 1–1; Zacarias 60' | PRO–FHL 1–0 | LEO–COU 0–0 | MAM–PRI 1–0; Julião 62' | FCU–NAC 1–1; Sansão 33' | PET–PHU 1–0 | PET–PHU 1–0 | MAM–PRI 1–0 | DCH–PRM 3–3; Maluka 30'; Afonso 75' o.g. | PRO–FHL 1–0 | 11 |
| 24 | 17/1/82 | 17/1/82 | 16/1/82 | 16/1/82 | 17/1/82 | 17/1/82 | 17/1/82 | 16/1/82 | 16/1/82 | 17/1/82 | 17/1/82 | 17/1/82 | 17/1/82 | 17/1/82 | |
| 24 | FHL–ACA 1–3; Chiby 35'; Altino 59' o.g. Sayombo 80' | PHU–COU 4–1 | NAC–DCH 3–1 | DTA–MAM 1–1; Geovety 87' pen. | FCU–LEO 0–0 | FHL–ACA 1–3; Tomás 13' | FCU–LEO 0–0 | DTA–MAM 1–1; Julião ' | NAC–DCH 3–1; Lino ' | PRI–PET 0–1; Jesus 6' pen. | PHU–COU 4–1; Américo ' Bito ' Saavedra x2 | PRI–PET 0–1 | PRM–PRO 0–2 | PRM–PRO 0–2 | 18 |
| 25 | 24/1/82 | 24/1/82 | 24/1/82 | 24/1/82 | 24/1/82 | 24/1/82 | 23/1/82 | 24/1/82 | 24/1/82 | 24/1/82 | 23/1/82 | 24/1/82 | 24/1/82 | 24/1/82 | |
| 25 | ACA–PRM 2–0 | COU–PRI 1–0 | DCH–FCU 3–0; Brás 2'; Basílio 12' 80' | PET–DTA 2–2; Ed.Machado 3' ? | DCH–FCU 3–0 | MAM–FHL 3–0 | LEO–PHU 3–3; Diamantino 13'; V.Dias 34' pen. | MAM–FHL 3–0 | PRO–NAC 1–2 | PET–DTA 2–2; Abreu 9'; R.Gomes 66' o.g. | LEO–PHU 3–3; Saavedra 15' | COU–PRI 1–0 | ACA–PRM 2–0 | PRO–NAC 1–2 | 22 |
| 26 | 7/2/82 | 7/2/82 | 7/2/82 | 7/2/82 | 7/2/82 | 7/2/82 | 7/2/82 | 7/2/82 | 7/2/82 | 7/2/82 | 6/2/82 | 6/2/82 | 7/2/82 | 7/2/82 | |
| 26 | NAC–ACA 0–0 | DTA–COU 1–2 | LEO–DCH 3–0 | DTA–COU 1–2 | FCU–PRO 1–2; Zacarias 31' pen. | FHL–PET 2–4; Barbosa ' Jacinto 43' | LEO–DCH 3–0 | MAM–PRM 3–0; Marques ' Santana x2 | NAC–ACA 0–0 | FHL–PET 2–4; Jesus 15' ? pen. Lito 60' 85' | PRI–PHU 3–0 | PRI–PHU 3–0 | MAM–PRM 3–0 | FCU–PRO 1–2 | 21 |
| T | 25 | 38 | 26 | 43 | 28 | 18 | 26 | 38 | 24 | 36 | 24 | 41 | 34 | 31 | 432 |

=== Top scorers ===
| Rank | Scorer | Club | Goals |
|---|---|---|---|
| 1 | (Angola) Joseph Maluka | 1º de Maio | 20 |
| 2 | (Angola) Jesus | Petro Atlético | 19 |
| 3 | (Angola) Alves | 1º de Agosto | 16 |
| 3 | (Angola) Eduardo Machado | TAAG | 16 |
| 3 | (Angola) Julião | Mambroa | 16 |
| 3 | (Angola) Vicy | Construtores | 16 |

=== Most goals scored in a single match ===
| Player | For | Against | Result | Round | Date |
4 goals (Poker)
| (Angola) Maluka | 1º de Maio | Construtores | 4-1 | 2 | Sat, 16 May 1981 |
3 goals (Hat-trick)
| (Angola) Santiago | Petro do Huambo | 1º de Maio | 2–3 | 3 | Sun, 24 May 1981 |
| (Angola) Vicy | Construtores | Leões de Luanda | 5–1 | 10 | Sun, 13 Sep 1981 |

== Champions ==
1981 Girabola winner

3rd title

Squad: Agostinho, Alves, Amândio, Ângelo, Barros, Dinis, Lourenço, Manico, Mendinho, Mesquita, Napoleão, Ndongala, Ndunguidi, Nsuka, Tandu, Zeca
Head coach: Joaquim Dinis
