= 1980 Girabola =

Girabola 1980
- Season: 1980 (19/4/1980 – 28/2/1981)
- Champions: 1º de Agosto
- Relegated: Palancas; Sagrada; Santa Rita; Sassamba
- 1981 African Cup of Champions Clubs: 1º de Agosto (Girabola winner)
- 1981 African Cup Winners' Cup: Nacional
- Matches: 182
- Top goalscorer: Alves (29 goals)

The 1980 Girabola was the second season of top-tier football competition in Angola. The season ran from 19 April 1980 to 28 February 1981. Primeiro de Agosto were the defending champions.

The league comprised 14 teams, the bottom three of which were relegated.

Primeiro de Agosto were crowned champions, winning their 2nd title, while Palancas do Huambo, Sagrada Esperança, Santa Rita and Sassamba da LS were relegated.

On the course of the championship, Santa Rita de Moçâmedes was renamed as Grupo Desportivo Welwitschia. Estrela Vermelha do Huambo, on its part, was renamed as Mambroa.

Francisco Carlos de Abreu a.k.a. Alves of Primeiro de Agosto finished as the top scorer with 29 goals.

== Changes from the 1979 season ==
Relegated: 14 de Abril, Desp de Xangongo, Diabos Negros, FC de Cabinda, FC Mbanza Congo, Ginásio do KK, Juv do Kunge, Luta SC Cabinda, Makotas de Malange, Naval Porto Amboim, Sassamba da LS, Vitória AC do Bié
Promoted: Sagrada Esperança, Sassamba da LS

Locations of the 1980 Girabola teams

== League table ==
Pos	Team	Pld	W	D	L	GF	GA	GD	Pts	Qualification or relegation
1	Primeiro de Agosto (C)	26	21	4	1	80	10	+70	46	Qualification for Champions Cup
2	Desportivo da TAAG (Note: Name later reverted to its original ASA)	26	19	4	3	72	19	+53	42	
3	Mambroa (Note: Name later reverted to its original Benfica do Huambo)	26	17	7	2	54	23	+31	41	
4	Nacional de Benguela	26	16	7	3	51	24	+27	39	Qualification for Cup Winners' Cup
5	Diabos Verdes (Note: Name later changed to Leões de Luanda and then reverted to its original Sporting de Luanda)	26	10	6	10	37	42	−5	26	
6	FC do Uíge	26	9	8	9	42	37	+5	26	
7	Académica do Lobito	25	11	3	11	36	33	+3	25	
8	Ferroviário da Huíla	26	7	10	9	23	28	−5	24	
9	Desportivo da Chela (Note: Name later reverted to its original Benfica do Lubango)	26	6	10	10	35	49	−14	22	
10	Construtores do Uíge	26	6	8	12	30	44	−14	20	
11	Palancas do Huambo (R)	25	6	4	15	23	56	−33	16	Relegation to Provincial stages
12	Sagrada Esperança (R)	26	5	5	16	30	46	−16	15	Relegation to Provincial stages
13	Sassamba da LS (R)	25	3	5	17	24	65	−41	11	Relegation to Provincial stages
14	Santa Rita (Note: On the course of the competition they were renamed as Welwitschia) (R)	25	1	5	19	10	71	−61	7	Relegation to Provincial stages

Updated to match(es) played on 22 November 1980. Source: Girabola.com
Rules for classification: 1) Points; 2) Head-to-head points; 3) Head-to-head goal difference; 4) Goal difference; 5) Goals scored; 6) Fair-play points; 7) Play-off.
(C) Champions; (R) Relegated

== Results ==
Home \ Away	ACA	COU	DCH	DTA	DVE	FCU	FHL	MAM	NAC	PAL	PRI	SAG	SAS	SRM
Académica do Lobito	—	2–1	7–1	1–0		1–0	1–0	0–1	1–1		0–3	1–0	0–0	2–1
Construtores do Uíge	1–1	—	1–1	1–2	0–1	1–0	1–1	2–2	1–2	2–2	0–1	4–1	2–1	3–0
Desportivo da Chela	1–0	1–1	—	1–2	5–2	2–2	0–1	1–2	1–3	3–1	1–2	2–1	3–1	0–0
Desportivo da Taag	5–3	3–0	2–1	—	0–0	2–1	1–1	1–0	1–2	6–0	2–0	3–1	11–2	9–0
Diabos Verdes	0–4	2–1	0–0	1–4	—	4–3	1–0	3–5	1–4	3–0	2–3	0–0	1–1	1–0
FC do Uíge	2–1	1–1	1–2	0–2	3–2	—	0–0	0–0	2–4	1–1	0–4		4–2	5–0
Ferroviário da Huíla	2–1	1–1	1–1	1–5	1–3	1–1	—	0–1	1–1	1–0	0–0	0–0	4–0	4–2
Mambroa	2–0	8–1	3–3	1–1	2–1	0–0	3–0	—	1–2	3–0	1–1	4–2	2–0	3–2
Nacional de Benguela	4–2	1–0	2–2	0–0	1–1	3–0	0–0	1–2	—	5–1	1–2	3–1	3–0	1–0
Palancas do Huambo	1–2	2–0	2–1	0–2	1–0	2–4	0–1	1–3	0–3	—	0–6	0–4	3–1	1–1
Primeiro de Agosto	2–0	5–0	7–0	2–0	2–1	0–0	2–0	0–0	3–1	3–0	—	3–0	9–0	11–0
Sagrada Esperança	3–2	2–0	1–1	0–2	2–3	0–2	1–2	0–1	0–1	0–1	0–2	—	3–2	2–2
Sassamba da L.S.	0–1	1–2	4–1	0–3	0–0	1–2	1–0	1–2	1–1	1–1	1–3	2–4	—	1–0
Santa Rita Moçâmedes	0–2	0–4	0–0	0–3	0–2	0–6	1–0	0–2	0–1	0–3	0–4	1–1		—

Updated to match(es) played on 22 November 1981. Source: girabola.com
Legend: Blue = home team win; Yellow = draw; Red = away team win.

== Season statistics ==
=== Scorers ===
R/T
R/T	ACA	COU	DCH	DTA	DVE	FCU	FHL	MAM	NAC	PAL	PRI	SAG	SAS	WEL	TOTAL
1	20/4/80	19/4/80	20/4/80	19/4/80	20/4/80	20/4/80	20/4/80	20/4/80	20/4/80	20/4/80	19/4/80	19/4/80	20/4/80	20/4/80	26
1	ACA–SAS 0–0	PRI–COU 5–0	DCH–FHL 0–1	DTA–SAG 3–1; Gonçalves 5' 70'; Geovety 37'	DVE–MAM 3–5; J. Machado x2 Loth	FCU–WEL 5–0; Mário 15' 51'; Arménio 43' 89'; Rizanó	DCH–FHL 0–1	DVE–MAM 3–5; Arlindo 45'; Firmino x2 Marques 12'; Santana	PAL–NAC 0–3; Nelson 39'; Samuel 50'; Muzenda 56'	PAL–NAC 0–3	PRI–COU 5–0; Alves 24' 70'; Amândio 75'; Ndunguidi 77' 85'	DTA–SAG 3–1	ACA–SAS 0–0	FCU–WEL 5–0	26
2	26/4/80	27/4/80	27/4/80	27/4/80	26/4/80	27/4/80	27/4/80	27/4/80	27/4/80	30/4/80	30/4/80	26/4/80	27/4/80	26/4/80	21
2	SAG–ACA 3–2	COU–SAS 2–1	NAC–DCH 2–2; Zé Amaro x2	MAM–DTA 1–1; Bondoso 62'	WEL–DVE 0–2; J.Machado 10'; Loth 71'	FHL–FCU 1–1	FHL–FCU 1–1	MAM–DTA 1–1; Firmino 32'	NAC–DCH 2–2; Samuel 25'	PRI–PAL 3–0	PRI–PAL 3–0; Mayele 15'; Mendinho 30'; Ndunguidi 50'	SAG–ACA 3–2	COU–SAS 2–1	WEL–DVE 0–0	21
3	4/5/80	3/5/80	4/5/80	4/5/80	4/5/80	4/5/80	4/5/80	4/5/80	4/5/80	4/5/80	4/5/80	3/5/80	4/5/80	4/5/80	22
3	ACA–MAM 0–1	SAG–COU 2–0	DCH–PRI 1–2; Lucas 89'	DVE–DTA 1–4; Juca 8'; E.Machado 35'; Geovety 55'; Jujú 83'	DVE–DTA 1–4; Joca 70'	FCU–NAC 2–4	WEL–FHL 1–0	ACA–MAM 0–1; Arlindo 42'	FCU–NAC 2–4	PAL–SAS 3–1	DCH–PRI 1–2; Lourenço; Mendinho 41'	SAG–COU 2–0; Caló; Kito	PAL–SAS 3–1	WEL–FHL 1–0; Ngola 1'	22
4	11/5/80	11/5/80	10/5/80	11/5/80	11/5/80	10/5/80	11/5/80	11/5/80	11/5/80	11/5/80	10/5/80	11/5/80	10/5/80	11/5/80	26
4	DTA–ACA 5–3; Chiby x3	COU–MAM 2–2	SAS–DCH 4–1	DTA–ACA 5–3; Ndisso 36' 46' 69'; Tozé 44'; Geovety 49'	FHL–DVE 1–3; Joca 48'; Loth 60'; J.Machado 75'	PRI–FCU 0–0	FHL–DVE 1–3; Canhoto 35'	COU–MAM 2–2	NAC–WEL 1–0; Nelson 25'	PAL–SAG 0–4	PRI–FCU 0–0	PAL–SAG 0–4	SAS–DCH 4–1	NAC–WEL 1–0	26
5	17/5/80	18/5/80	17/5/80	18/5/80	17/5/80	18/5/80	18/5/80	18/5/80	18/5/80	18/5/80	17/5/80	17/5/80	18/5/80	17/5/80	24
5	ACA–DVE 1–2; Chiby pen.	DTA–COU 3–0	DCH–SAG 2–1; Zé Amaro 19'; Lucas 83'	DTA–COU 3–0	ACA–DVE 1–2; Gino 17'; Loth 27'	FCU–SAS 4–2	FHL–NAC 1–1	MAM–PAL 3–0	FHL–NAC 1–1	MAM–PAL 3–0	WEL–PRI 0–4; Ndunguidi 30' 90; Alves 51' 83'	DCH–SAG 2–1; Fela 75'	FCU–SAS 4–2	WEL–PRI 0–4	24
6	25/5/80	25/5/80	25/5/80	25/5/80	25/5/80	26/5/80	25/5/80	25/5/80	25/5/80	25/5/80	25/5/80	26/5/80	25/5/80	25/5/80	14
6	COU–ACA 1–1; Chiby 47'	COU–ACA 1–1; Rosi 70'	DCH–MAM 1–2; Zé Amaro 17'	PAL–DTA 0–2	NAC–DVE 1–1	SAG–FCU 0–2; Arménio; Rizanó	PRI–FHL 2–0	DCH–MAM 1–2; Arlindo 59'; Santana 90'	NAC–DVE 1–1	PAL–DTA 0–2	PRI–FHL 2–0; Alves 23'; Barros 71'	SAG–FCU 0–2	SAS–WEL 1–0	SAS–WEL 1–0	14
7	1/6/80	31/5/80	1/6/80	1/6/80	31/5/80	1/6/80	1/6/80	1/6/80	1/6/80	1/6/80	1/6/80		1/6/80		17
7	PAL–ACA 1–2	DVE–COU 2–0	DTA–DCH 2–1	DTA–DCH 2–1	DVE–COU 2–0; Loth 8'; J.Machado 84'	FCU–MAM 0–0	FHL–SAS 4–0	FCU–MAM 0–0	NAC–PRI 1–2; Baptista 25'	PAL–ACA 1–2	NAC–PRI 1–2; Alves; Ndunguidi 17'	WEL–SAG 1–1	FHL–SAS 4–0	WEL–SAG 1–1	17
8	8/6/80	8/6/80	8/6/80	7/6/80	8/6/80	7/6/80	8/6/80	8/6/80	8/6/80	8/6/80	8/6/80	8/6/80	8/6/80	8/6/80	28
8	ACA–DCH 7–1; Delgado 10'; Arnaldo 50'; Sayombo 59'; Pintar 79'; Chiby 89' 90+2'; Firmino o.g.	COU–PAL 2–2; Afonso 24'; Kuzieme 44'	ACA–DCH 7–1; Lucas 36'	DTA–FCU 2–1; E.Machado 28' 65' pen.	PRI–DVE 2–1; Loth 39'	DTA–FCU 2–1; Lutucuta 88'	SAG–FHL 1–2	MAM–WEL 3–2; Maria 43' 84' 90'	SAS–NAC 1–1; Silva 79'	COU–PAL 2–2; Bento 51'; Riquito 65'	PRI–DVE 2–1; Mavuba 16' pen. Nsuka	SAG–FHL 1–2	SAS–NAC 1–1; Claudino 56'	MAM–WEL 3–2; Antoninho 10'; Zeca 62'	28
9	15/6/80	15/6/80	15/6/80	14/6/80	15/6/80	15/6/80	15/6/80	15/6/80	15/6/80	15/6/80	14/6/80	15/6/80	14/6/80	14/6/80	27
9	FCU–ACA 2–1	DCH–COU 1–1	DCH–COU 1–1	WEL–DTA 0–3; Jujú 80' 88'; Benny 85'	DVE–PAL 3–0; Dianingana; Loth x2	FCU–ACA 2–1	MAM–FHL 3–0	MAM–FHL 3–0; Santana 42'	NAC–SAG 3–1; Nelson 51'; Baptista 75'; Joãozinho 89'	DVE–PAL 3–0	PRI–SAS 9–0; Nsuka 13'; Barros 17' 22' 72'; Alves 25' 32' 37' ? ?	NAC–SAG 3–1; Lumbua 28' pen.	PRI–SAS 9–0	WEL–DTA 0–3	27
10	22/6/80	22/6/80	22/6/80	22/6/80	21/6/80	22/6/80	22/6/80	22/6/80	22/6/80	22/6/80	16/7/80	16/7/80	21/6/80	22/6/80	15
10	ACA–WEL 2–1; Arnaldo 47'; Mateus 53'	COU–FCU 1–0	DCH–PAL 3–1	DTA–FHL 1–1; Juca	SAS–DVE 0–0	COU–FCU 1–0	DTA–FHL 1–1; Tozé 87'	MAM–NAC 1–2; Firmino	MAM–NAC 1–2; Baptista; Lino 47'	DCH–PAL 3–1	SAG–PRI 0–2; Julião 21'; Alves 80'	SAG–PRI 0–2	SAS–DVE 0–0	ACA–WEL 2–1; Zeca 3'	15
11	29/6/80	29/6/80	28/6/80	29/6/80	28/6/80	29/6/80	29/6/80	29/6/80	29/6/80	29/6/80	29/6/80	29/6/80	29/6/80	29/6/80	17
11	FHL–ACA 2–1; Chiby; Rosi 9' 41'; Vicy 73'	COU–WEL 3–0	DVE–DCH 0–0	NAC–DTA 0–0	DVE–DCH 0–0	PAL–FCU 2–4; Mário 8'; Arménio 14' 82'; Camungua 52'	FHL–ACA 2–1; Antunes 14'; Caco	PRI–MAM 0–0	NAC–DTA 0–0	PAL–FCU 2–4; Bento 68' ?	PRI–MAM 0–0	SAG–SAS 3–2	SAG–SAS 3–2	COU–WEL 3–0	17
12	30/7/80	6/7/80	6/7/80	6/7/80	5/7/80	6/7/80	6/7/80		30/7/80	5/7/80	6/7/80	5/7/80		5/7/80	15
12	ACA–NAC 1–1; Sayombo 4'	COU–FHL 1–1	DCH–FCU 2–2	DTA–PRI 2–0; Chinguito 43'; Ed.Machado 45'	DVE–SAG 0–0	DCH–FCU 2–2	COU–FHL 1–1	MAM–SAS 2–0	ACA–NAC 1–1; Lino 46'	WEL–PAL 0–3	DTA–PRI 2–0	DVE–SAG 0–0	MAM–SAS 2–0	WEL–PAL 0–3	15
13	13/7/80	13/7/80		12/7/80	13/7/80	13/7/80		12/7/80	13/7/80		13/7/80	12/7/80	12/7/80		13
13	PRI–ACA 2–0	NAC–COU 1–0	DCH–WEL 0–0	SAS–DTA 0–3	FCU–DVE 3–2; Nacib 10'; Loth 40'	FCU–DVE 3–2; Arménio 6' 72'	PAL–FHL 0–1	SAG–MAM 0–1; B. da Rosa 25'	NAC–COU 1–0; Samuel 6'	PAL–FHL 0–1	PRI–ACA 2–0; Alves; Mendinho	SAG–MAM 0–1	SAS–DTA 0–3	DCH–WEL 0–0	13
14	16/8/80	17/8/80	17/8/80	16/8/80	27/11/80	17/8/80	17/8/80	27/11/80	17/8/80	17/8/80	17/8/80	16/8/80	16/8/80	17/8/80	21
14	SAS–ACA 0–1; Arnaldo 41'	COU–PRI 0–1	FHL–DCH 1–1	SAG–DTA 0–2	MAM–DVE 2–1	WEL–FCU 0–6; Armindo 5' 60' 75'; Vicky 35'	FHL–DCH 1–1	MAM–DVE 2–1	NAC–PAL 5–1; Nelson 1'; Samuel 10' 87'; Garcia 42'; Lino 63'	NAC–PAL 5–1; Diamantino 77'	COU–PRI 0–1; Alves 68'	SAG–DTA 0–2	SAS–ACA 0–1	WEL–FCU 0–6	21
15	24/8/80	23/8/80	24/8/80	24/8/80	23/8/80	24/8/80	24/8/80	24/8/80	24/8/80	24/8/80	24/8/80	24/8/80	SAS–23/8/80	23/8/80	16
15	ACA–SAG 1–0	SAS–COU 1–2	DCH–NAC 1–3	DTA–MAM 1–0	DVE–WEL 1–0	FCU–FHL 0–0	FCU–FHL 0–0	DTA–MAM 1–0	DCH–NAC 1–3; Nelson 25' ? Joãozinho	PAL–PRI 0–6	PAL–PRI 0–6; Alves 15'; Ndunguidi 42' 45'; Dinis 54' 82'; Cândido 66' o.g.	ACA–SAG 1–0	SAS–COU 1–2	DVE–WEL 1–0	16
16	24/8/80	23/8/80	24/8/80	24/8/80	23/8/80	24/8/80	24/8/80	24/8/80	24/8/80	24/8/80	24/8/80	24/8/80	23/8/80<	23/8/80	25
16	MAM–ACA 2–0	COU–SAG 4–1	PRI–DCH 7–0	DTA–DVE 0–0	DTA–DVE 0–0	NAC–FCU 3–0	FHL–WEL 4–2	MAM–ACA 2–0	NAC–FCU 3–0; Muzenda 20'; Samuel 39'; Lino 88'	SAS–PAL 1–1	PRI–DCH 7–0; Alves x2 Dinis x2 Mendinho; Ndunguidi x2	COU–SAG 4–1	SAS–PAL 1–1	FHL–WEL 4–2	25
17	7/9/80	7/9/80	7/9/80	7/9/80	7/9/80	7/9/80	7/9/80	7/9/80	6/9/80	6/9/80	7/9/80	6/9/80	7/9/80	6/9/80	21
17	ACA–DTA 1–0; Chiby 14'	MAM–COU 8–1	DCH–SAS 3–1	ACA–DTA 1–0	DVE–FHL 1–0; Loth 25'	FCU–PRI 0–4	DVE–FHL 1–0	MAM–COU 8–1	WEL–NAC 0–1	SAG–PAL 0–1	FCU–PRI 0–4; Alves 8' 22'; Ndunguidi 56'; Dinis	SAG–PAL 0–1	DCH–SAS 3–1	WEL–NAC 0–1	21
18	14/9/80	14/9/80	13/9/80	14/9/80	14/9/80	13/9/80	14/9/80	14/9/80	14/9/80	14/9/80	13/9/80	13/9/80	13/9/80	13/9/80	27
18	DVE–ACA 0–4; Mateus 16'; Artur 36'; Chiby 67'; Franco	COU–DTA 1–2	SAG–DCH 1–1	COU–DTA 1–2	DVE–ACA 0–4	SAS–FCU 1–2; Armindo; Mário	NAC–FHL 0–0	PAL–MAM 1–3; Arlindo 5' 21'; Marques 57'	NAC–FHL 0–0	PAL–MAM 1–3; Mário 26'	PRI–WEL 11–0; Alves x4 Amândio; Dinis; Lourenço x2 Mendinho x2 Ndunguidi	SAG–DCH 1–1	SAS–FCU 1–2; Sapalo	PRI–WEL 11–0	27
19	2/11/80	2/11/80	30/11/80	28/12/80	26/10/80	2/11/80	28/12/80	30/11/80	26/10/80	28/12/80	28/12/80	2/11/80	10/1/81	10/1/81	23
19	ACA–COU 2–1	ACA–COU 2–1	MAM–DCH 3–3	DTA–PAL 6–0	DVE–NAC 1–4; Franco 4'	FCU–SAG 2–1	FHL–PRI 0–0	MAM–DCH 3–3	DVE–NAC 1–4; Lino; Samuel x3	DTA–PAL 6–0	FHL–PRI 0–0	FCU–SAG 2–1	WEL–SAS –	WEL–SAS –	23
20	28/9/80	4/1/81	4/1/81	4/1/81	4/1/81	28/12/80	27/9/80	28/12/80	4/1/81	28/9/80	4/1/81	27/9/80	27/9/80	27/9/80	13
20	ACA–PAL –	COU–DVE 0–1	DCH–DTA 1–2; Honda	DCH–DTA 1–2; Geovety 15'; Rola	COU–DVE 0–1	MAM–FCU 0–0	SAS–FHL 1–0	MAM–FCU 0–0	PRI–NAC 3–1; Silva 30'	ACA–PAL –	PRI–NAC 3–1; Alves 35'; Lourenço 68'; Amândio 72'	SAG–WEL 2–2	SAS–FHL 1–0; Bento 15'	SAG–WEL 2–2	13
21	15/2/81	22/11/80	15/2/81	11/1/81	11/1/81	11/1/81	23/11/80	4/1/81	23/11/80	22/11/80	11/1/81	23/11/80	23/11/80	4/1/81	15
21	DCH–ACA 1–0	PAL–COU 2–0	DCH–ACA 1–0	FCU–DTA 0–2	DVE–PRI 2–3; Franco 18'; J.Machado	FCU–DTA 0–2	FHL–SAG 0–0	WEL–MAM 0–2	NAC–SAS 3–0	PAL–COU 2–0; Diamantino 24' 71'	DVE–PRI 2–3; Alves 12' 76'	FHL–SAG 0–0	NAC–SAS 3–0	WEL–MAM 0–2	15
22	7/12/80	10/1/81	10/1/81	25/1/81	7/12/80	7/12/80	11/1/81	11/1/81	6/12/80	7/12/80	6/12/80	6/12/80	6/12/80	25/1/81	19
22	ACA–FCU 1–0	COU–DCH 1–1	COU–DCH 1–1	DTA–WEL 9–0	PAL–DVE 1–0	ACA–FCU 1–0	FHL–MAM 0–1	FHL–MAM 0–1	SAG–NAC 0–1	PAL–DVE 1–0	SAS–PRI 1–3	SAG–NAC 0–1	SAS–PRI 1–3	DTA–WEL 9–0	19
23	28/2/81	14/12/80	14/12/80	14/12/80	14/12/80	14/12/80	14/12/80	14/12/80	14/12/80	14/12/80	13/12/80	13/12/80	14/12/80	28/2/81	21
23	WEL–ACA 0–2; Arnaldo 19' 68'	FCU–COU 1–1	PAL–DCH 2–1	FHL–DTA 1–5; Chico Dinis ? 46'; Ed.Machado x2 Tozé	DVE–SAS 1–1; J.Machado 25'	FCU–COU 1–1	FHL–DTA 1–5; Chico	NAC–MAM 1–2	NAC–MAM 1–2	PAL–DCH 2–1	PRI–SAG 3–0	PRI–SAG 3–0; Alves; Mendinho; Ndunguidi	DVE–SAS 1–1	WEL–ACA 0–2	21
24	25/1/81	20/12/80	21/12/80	4/2/81	21/12/80	21/12/80	25/1/81	21/12/80	4/2/81	21/12/80	21/12/80	21/12/80	21/12/80	20/12/80	25
24	ACA–FHL 1–0	WEL–COU 0–4	DCH–DVE 5–2	DTA–NAC 1–2; Ed.Machado	DCH–DVE 5–2	FCU–PAL 1–1	ACA–FHL 1–0	MAM–PRI 1–1; Arlindo 48'	DTA–NAC 1–2; Joãozinho; Lino	FCU–PAL 1–1	MAM–PRI 1–1; Alves 78'	SAS–SAG 2–4	SAS–SAG 2–4	WEL–COU 0–4	25
25	18/1/81	18/1/81	18/1/81	18/1/81	17/1/81	18/1/81	18/1/81	17/1/81	18/1/81	18/1/81	18/1/81	17/1/81	17/1/81	18/1/81	23
25	NAC–ACA 4–2	FHL–COU 1–1	FCU–DCH 1–2	PRI–DTA 2–0	SAG–DVE 2–3; Loth 1' 32'; Zé Luís 86'	FCU–DCH 1–2	FHL–COU 1–1	SAS–MAM 1–2	NAC–ACA 4–2	PAL–WEL 1–1	PRI–DTA 2–0; Tandu 66' 81'	SAG–DVE 2–3; Lumbua 25' 90'	SAS–MAM 1–2	PAL–WEL 1–1	23
26	1/2/81	1/2/81	1/2/81	31/1/81	1/2/81	1/2/81	1/2/81	1/2/81	1/2/81	1/2/81	1/2/81	1/2/81	31/1/81	1/2/81	33
26	ACA–PRI 0–3	COU–NAC 1–2	WEL–DCH 0–0	DTA–SAS 11–2	DVE–FCU 4–3	DVE–FCU 4–3	FHL–PAL 1–0	MAM–SAG 4–2	COU–NAC 1–2	FHL–PAL 1–0	ACA–PRI 0–3	MAM–SAG 4–2	DTA–SAS 11–2	WEL–DCH 0–0	33
T	36	30	35	72	37	42	23	54	51	23	80	30	24	10	547

=== Top scorers ===
Rank	Scorer	Club	Goals
1	(Angola) Francisco Abreu Alves	1º de Agosto	29

=== Most goals scored in a single match ===
Player	For	Against	S	R	Date
5 goals
(Angola) Alves	1º de Agosto	Sassamba da L.S.	9–0 (H)	9	June 14, 1980
4 goals (Poker)
(Angola) Alves	1º de Agosto	Welwitschia	11-0 (H)	18	September 13, 1980
3 goals (Hat-trick)
(Angola) Chiby	Académica Lobito	Desp. da TAAG	3–5 (A)	4	May 11, 1980
(Angola) Ndisso	Desp. da TAAG	Académica Lobito	5–3 (H)	4	May 11, 1980
(Angola) Maria	Mambroa	Santa Rita	3–2 (H)	8	June 8, 1980
(Angola) Barros	1º de Agosto	Sassamba da L.S.	9–0 (H)	9	June 14, 1980
(Angola) Armindo	F.C. do Uíge	Welwitschia *	0–6 (A)	14	August 17, 1980
(Angola) Samuel	Nacional de Benguela	Diabos Verdes	1–4 (A)	19	October 26, 1980

== Champions ==
1980 Girabola winner

2nd title

Squad: Agostinho, Alves, Amândio, Ângelo, Barros, Cartaxo, Chimalanga, Cuba, Dinis, Garcia, Horácio, Ivo, Januário, Julião, Lourenço, Luvambo, Manico, Mascarenhas, Mateus, Mavuba, Mayele, Mendinho, Mesquita, Napoleão, Ndongala, Ndunguidi, Neto, Nsuka, Rosinha, Sabino, Sansão, Suba, Tandu, Túbia, Vieira Dias, Zeca, Zomi
Head coach: Ivan Ridanović
