= 1979 Girabola =

Girabola 1979
- Season: 1979 (8 December 1979 – 23 March 1980)
- Champions: 1º de Agosto
- Relegated: 14 Abril; Diabos Negros; FC Cabinda; FC Mbanza; Ginásio KK; Juv Kunje; Luta SC; Makotas; Naval PA; Vitória SC; Xangongo; Santa Rita; Sassamba
- 1980 African Cup of Champions Clubs: 1º de Agosto (Girabola winner)
- Matches: 126
- Goals: 130 (1.03 per match)
- Top goalscorer: João Machado (18 goals)
- Biggest home win: TAAG 11–0 Desp Xangongo (23 February 1980)
- Biggest away win: Luta SC 1–6 1º de Agosto (9 Dec 1979); Construtores 1–6 1º de Agosto (10 February 1980)
- Highest scoring: TAAG 11–0 Desp Xangongo (23 February 1980)
- Longest winning run: 1º de Agosto (10) (9 Dec 1979 – 10 Feb 1980)
- Longest unbeaten run: 1º de Agosto (10) (9 Dec 1979 – 10 Feb 1980)
- Longest winless run: Desp Xangongo (10) (9 Dec 1979 – 9 Feb 1980)
- Longest losing run: Desp Xangongo (10) (9 Dec 1979 – 9 Feb 1980)

1979 Girabola was the annual national Angola football (soccer) tournament, Girabola, held in 1979. It was the first national championship organized after Angola achieved independence in 1975. Due to the Angolan Civil War this was the first (and only) tournament that included teams from all Angolan provinces. By then, there were only sixteen provinces. Later on, the province of Lunda was split in two: Lunda Norte and Lunda Sul and Bengo was also created.

On the course of the championship, Sporting Clube de Luanda was renamed as Diabos Verdes.

Twenty-for teams were divided into four groups of six teams each with the top team advancing to the semi-finals.

João Machado of Diabos Verdes finished as the top scorer with 18 goals.

Locations of the 1979 Girabola teams

== League table ==
Pos	Team	Pld	W	D	L	GF	GA	GD	Pts	Qualification or relegation
1	Primeiro de Agosto (C)	14	13	0	1	49	11	+38	26	Qualification for Champions Cup
2	Nacional de Benguela	13	9	1	3	33	12	+21	19	
3	TAAG (Note: Name later reverted to its original ASA)	13	9	0	4	39	12	+27	18	
4	Palancas do Huambo	12	10	1	1	35	19	+16	21	
5	Ferroviário da Huíla	10	7	2	1	13	6	+7	16	
6	Diabos Verdes (Note: Name later changed to Leões de Luanda and then reverted to its original Sporting de Luanda)	10	7	1	2	32	10	+22	15	
7	Académica do Lobito	10	6	3	1	24	13	+11	15	
8	Estrela Vermelha (Note: Name later changed to Mambroa and then reverted to its original Benfica do Huambo)	10	7	1	2	20	10	+10	15	
9	FC do Uíge	10	6	2	2	24	13	+11	14	
10	Desportivo da Chela (Note: Name later reverted to its original Benfica do Lubango)	10	5	3	2	20	7	+13	13	
11	Santa Rita (Note: Name later changed to G.D. Welwitschia)	10	4	2	4	13	11	+2	10	
12	Construtores do Uíge	9	4	2	3	18	19	−1	10	
13	Vitória do Bié (R)	10	4	1	5	12	16	−4	9	Relegation to Provincial stages
14	Ginásio do KK (R)	10	3	2	5	10	19	−9	8	Relegation to Provincial stages
15	FC de Cabinda (R)	9	3	1	5	8	13	−5	7	Relegation to Provincial stages
16	Sassamba da LS (R)	10	2	3	5	4	14	−10	7	Relegation to Provincial stages
17	Makotas de Malanje (R)	10	2	2	6	10	15	−5	6	Relegation to Provincial stages
18	Naval de P.A. (R)	10	3	0	7	18	28	−10	6	Relegation to Provincial stages
19	FC Mbanza Congo (R)	10	2	1	7	10	29	−19	5	Relegation to Provincial stages
20	Juventude do Kunje (R)	10	1	2	7	8	23	−15	4	Relegation to Provincial stages
21	14 de Abril (R)	10	1	2	7	10	26	−16	4	Relegation to Provincial stages
22	Diabos Negros (R)	10	1	1	8	8	24	−16	3	Relegation to Provincial stages
23	Luta Sport Clube (R)	10	0	2	8	11	32	−21	2	Relegation to Provincial stages
24	Desportivo de Xangongo (R)	10	0	0	10	6	48	−42	0	Relegation to Provincial stages

Updated to match(es) played on 23 March 1980. Source: Girabola.com
Rules for classification: 1) Points; 2) Head-to-head points; 3) Head-to-head goal difference; 4) Goal difference; 5) Goals scored; 6) Fair-play points; 7) Play-off.
(C) Champions; (R) Relegated

== Preliminary rounds ==
=== Serie A ===
Round 1

Sat, 8 Dec 1979	FC Mbanza Congo	1–3	Construtores	Mbanza Congo
16:00			Vicy

Sun, 9 Dec 1979	Luta SC Cabinda	1–6	1º de Agosto	Cabinda
16:00			Julião; Barros; Ndunguidi; Sabino	Stadium: Tafe

Sun, 9 Dec 1979	FC do Uíge	3–0	FC Cabinda	Uíge
16:00				Stadium: 4 de Janeiro

Round 6

Sun, 13 Jan 1980	Construtores	1–3	FC Mbanza Congo	Uíge
16:00				Stadium: 4 de Janeiro

Sun, 13 Jan 1980	1º de Agosto	5–1	Luta SC Cabinda	Luanda
16:00	Zeca 12'; Lourenço 15', 50'; Amândio 58'; Túbia 63'		68' Cia	Stadium: Coqueiros

Sun, 13 Jan 1980	FC Cabinda	0–1	FC do Uíge	Cabinda
16:00			15' Rita	Stadium: Tafe; Referee: Manuel Patriota, Manuel Vasconcelos, Faustino Ngongo

Round 2

Sun, 16 Dec 1979	1º de Agosto	8–0	FC Mbanza Congo	Luanda
16:00	Barros; Sabino; Ndunguidi; Julião; Zeca; Túbia			Stadium: Cidadela; Referee: João Manita

Sun, 16 Dec 1979	Construtores	1–1	FC do Uíge	Uíge
16:00				Stadium: 4 de Janeiro

Sun, 16 Dec 1979	FC Cabinda	1–1	Luta SC Cabinda	Cabinda
16:00	Mangueira		Pedro Dias	Stadium: Tafe; Referee: Miguel Sebastião

Round 7

Sat, 19 Jan 1980	FC Mbanza Congo	1–3	1º de Agosto	Mbanza Congo
16:00

Mon, 21 Jan 1980	FC do Uíge	1–1	Construtores	Uíge
16:00				Stadium: 4 de Janeiro

Sun, 20 Jan 1980	Luta SC Cabinda	1–2	FC Cabinda	Cabinda
16:00				Stadium: Tafe

Round 3

Sat, 22 Dec 1979	FC Mbanza Congo	3–5	FC do Uíge	Mbanza Congo
16:00

Sun, 23 Dec 1979	FC Cabinda	0–2	1º de Agosto	Cabinda
16:00			43' Sansão; 75' Barros	Stadium: Tafe; Referee: Mário Melo, Cardeal, Fraga

Sun, 23 Dec 1979	Construtores	5–2	Luta SC Cabinda	Uíge
16:00				Stadium: 4 de Janeiro

Round 8

Tue, 29 Jan 1980	FC do Uíge	4–0	FC Mbanza Congo	Uíge
16:00	Arménio (?); Rechinol (?)			Stadium: 4 de Janeiro

Sat, 26 Jan 1980	1º de Agosto	4–1	FC Cabinda	Luanda
20:00	Amândio 35', 71'; Barros 52', 68'		16' J.Luís	Stadium: Coqueiros

Sun, 27 Jan 1980	Luta SC Cabinda	1–3	Construtores	Cabinda
16:00				Stadium: Tafe

Round 4

Sat, 29 Dec 1979	1º de Agosto	3–1	FC do Uíge	Luanda
16:00	Amândio; Ndunguidi		40' David Mário	Stadium: Cidadela; Referee: Luís Mac-Mahon, Manuel Carvalho, António Capita

Dec 1979	Construtores	3–1	FC Cabinda	Uíge
16:00

Sun, 30 Dec 1979	Luta SC Cabinda	1–1	FC Mbanza Congo	Cabinda
16:00				Stadium: Tafe

Round 9

Sun, 3 Feb 1980	FC do Uíge	0–3	1º de Agosto	Uíge
16:00			2' Sabino; 27' Amândio	Stadium: 4 de Janeiro

	FC Cabinda	–	Construtores	Cabinda
16:00				Stadium: Tafe

Sun, 3 Feb 1980	FC Mbanza Congo	2–1	Luta SC Cabinda	Mbanza Congo
16:00

Round 5

Sun, 6 Jan 1980	1º de Agosto	3–2	Construtores	Luanda
16:00	Barros; Túbia		Vicy	Referee: Pereira Lopes

Sat, 23 Feb 1980	FC do Uíge	6–1	Luta SC Cabinda	Uíge
16:00				Stadium: 4 de Janeiro

Sun, 6 Jan 1980	FC Cabinda	2–0	FC Mbanza Congo	Cabinda
16:00				Stadium: Tafe

Round 10

Sun, 10 Feb 1980	Construtores	1–6	1º de Agosto	Uíge
16:00				Stadium: 4 de Janeiro

Sun, 10 Feb 1980	Luta SC Cabinda	1–2	FC do Uíge	Cabinda
16:00				Stadium: Tafe

Sun, 10 Feb 1980	FC Mbanza Congo	0–2	FC Cabinda	Mbanza Congo
16:00

==== Table and results ====
Pos	Team	Pld	W	D	L	GF	GA	GD	Pts	Qualification or relegation	PRI	FCU	CUI	FCC	FCM	LSC
1	Primeiro de Agosto (C)	10	10	0	0	43	8	+35	20	Semi-finals		3–1	3–2	4–1	8–0	5–1
2	FC do Uíge	10	6	2	2	24	13	+11	14		0–3		1–1	3–0	4–0	6–1
3	Construtores do Uíge	9	4	2	3	20	19	+1	10		1–6	1–1		3–1	1–3	5–2
4	FC de Cabinda	9	3	1	5	9	15	−6	7		0–2	0–1	–		2–0	1–1
5	FC Mbanza Congo	10	2	1	7	11	30	−19	5		1–3	3–5	1–3	0–2		2–1
6	Luta Sport Clube	10	0	2	8	11	33	−22	2		1–6	1–2	1–3	1–2	1–1	

Updated to match(es) played on 10 February 1980. Source: Girabola.com
Rules for classification: 1) Points; 2) Head-to-head points; 3) Head-to-head goal difference; 4) Goal difference; 5) Goals scored; 6) Fair-play points; 7) Play-off.
(C) Champions

=== Serie B ===
Round 1

Sat, 8 Dec 1979	Académica Lobito	1–1	Vitória AC Bié	Lobito
16:00	Chiby 16'		11'Minguito	Stadium: Buraco

Sat, 8 Dec 1979	Juv do Kunge	2–0	14 de Abril	Kuito
16:00

Sat, 9 Dec 1979	Palancas Huambo	2–1	Santa Rita	Huambo
16:00	Rafael

Round 6

Sun, 13 Jan 1980	Vitória AC Bié	0–2	Académica Lobito	Kuito
16:00

Sun, 13 Jan 1980	14 de Abril	1–1	Juv do Kunge	Luena
16:00				Stadium: 1º de Maio

Sun, 13 Jan 1980	Santa Rita	1–1	Palancas Huambo	Moçâmedes
16:00				Stadium: Joaquim Morais

Round 2

Sun, 16 Dec 1979	Santa Rita	1–0	Juv do Kunge	Moçâmedes
16:00				Stadium: Joaquim Morais

Sun, 16 Dec 1979	14 de Abril	1–4	Académica Lobito	Luena
16:00				Stadium: 1º de Maio

Sun, 16 Dec 1979	Vitória AC Bié	0–1	Palancas Huambo	Kuito
16:00			Kumandala

Round 7

Sat, 19 Jan 1980	Juv do Kunge	0–1	Santa Rita	Kuito
16:00

Sun, 20 Jan 1980	Académica Lobito	5–1	14 de Abril	Lobito
16:00

Sun, 20 Jan 1980	Palancas Huambo	2–0	Vitória AC Bié	Huambo
16:00	Mário 19'; Riquito 80'			Referee: Manuel Catendi

Round 3

Sun, 23 Dec 1979	Académica Lobito	1–1	Santa Rita	Lobito
16:00	Mateus 64'		28' Januário	Stadium: Buraco; Referee: Pereira Lopes, Eurico Barata, Figueiredo Andrade

Sun, 23 Dec 1979	Palancas Huambo	6–2	Juv do Kunge	Huambo
16:00	Diamantino 11', 16', 44'; Kumandala (?); Rafael 55'; Zé Maria 85'		21' (?) Paulo	Referee: João Manita, Joaquim Faria, Augusto Matias

Sun, 23 Dec 1979	Vitória AC Bié	2–4	14 de Abril	Kuito
16:00

Round 8

Sun, 27 Jan 1980	Santa Rita	0–1	Académica Lobito	Moçâmedes
16:00				Stadium: Joaquim Morais

Sun, 27 Jan 1980	Juv do Kunge	1–5	Palancas Huambo	Kuito
16:00

Sun, 27 Jan 1980	14 de Abril	1–2	Vitória AC Bié	Luena
16:00				Stadium: 1º de Maio

Round 4

Sun, 30 Dec 1979	Santa Rita	3–0	14 de Abril	Moçâmedes
16:00				Stadium: Joaquim Morais

Sun, 30 Dec 1979	Palancas Huambo	6–0	Académica Lobito	Huambo
16:00

Sat, 29 Dec 1979	Juv do Kunge	1–2	Vitória AC Bié	Kuito
16:00

Round 9

Sun, 3 Feb 1980	14 de Abril	1–1	Santa Rita	Luena
16:00				Stadium: 1º de Maio

Sun, 3 Feb 1980	Académica Lobito	4–2	Palancas Huambo	Lobito
16:00	Franco 11' (?); Chiby (?)		(?) Kumandala	Stadium: Ex-Lusitanos

Sun, 3 Feb 1980	Vitória AC Bié	1–0	Juv do Kunge	Luena
16:00				Stadium: Estádio Municipal

Round 5

Sat, 5 Jan 1980	Vitória AC Bié	3–1	Santa Rita	Kuito
16:00				Stadium: Estádio Municipal

Sun, 6 Jan 1980	Académica Lobito	5–0	Juv do Kunge	Lobito
16:00				Stadium: Buraco

Sun, 6 Jan 1980	14 de Abril	0–1	Palancas Huambo	Luena
16:00				Stadium: 1º de Maio

Round 10

Sun, 10 Feb 1980	Santa Rita	3–1	Vitória AC Bié	Moçâmedes
16:00				Stadium: Joaquim Morais

Sat, 23 Feb 1980	Juv do Kunge	1–1	Académica Lobito	Kuito
16:00

Sun, 10 Feb 1980	Palancas Huambo	5–1	14 de Abril	Huambo
16:00

==== Table and results ====
Pos	Team	Pld	W	D	L	GF	GA	GD	Pts	Qualification or relegation	PAL	ACA	SAN	VIT	JUV	14A
1	Palancas do Huambo	10	9	0	1	32	10	+22	18	Semi-finals		6–0	2–1	2–0	6–2	5–1
2	Académica do Lobito	10	6	3	1	24	13	+11	15		4–2		1–1	1–1	5–0	5–1
3	Santa Rita de Moçâmedes	10	4	2	4	13	11	+2	10		1–2	0–1		3–1	1–0	3–0
4	Vitória do Bié	10	4	1	5	12	16	−4	9		0–1	0–2	3–1		1–0	2–4
5	Juventude do Kunje	10	1	2	7	8	23	−15	4		1–5	1–1	0–1	1–2		2–0
6	14 de Abril do Moxico	10	1	2	7	10	26	−16	4		0–1	1–4	0–1	1–2	1–1	

Updated to match(es) played on 10 February 1980. Source: Girabola.com
Rules for classification: 1) Points; 2) Head-to-head points; 3) Head-to-head goal difference; 4) Goal difference; 5) Goals scored; 6) Fair-play points; 7) Play-off.

=== Serie C ===
Round 1

Sat, 8 Dec 1979	Desp da Chela	1–1	Nacional Benguela	Lubango
15:00

Sun, 9 Dec 1979	Sassamba da LS	2–1	Diabos Negros	Saurimo
16:00

Sun, 9 Dec 1979	Makotas de Malange	1–2	Ferroviário da Huíla	Malanje
16:00

Round 6

Sun, 13 Jan 1980	Nacional Benguela	2–0	Desp da Chela	Benguela
15:00	Lino; Santiago (o.g.)			Referee: Luís Mac-Mahon

Sun, 13 Jan 1980	Diabos Negros	0–0	Sassamba da LS	N'dalatando
15:30

Sun, 13 Jan 1980	Ferroviário da Huíla	1–0	Makotas de Malange	Lubango
16:00				Stadium: Ferrovia

Round 2

Sun, 16 Dec 1979	Nacional Benguela	2–1	Makotas de Malange	Benguela
16:00	Silva 3'; Samuel 4'		85' Pinheiro	Stadium: S.Filipe; Referee: Jorge Adriano

Sat, 15 Dec 1979	Ferroviário da Huíla	0–0	Sassamba da LS	Lubango
16:00				Stadium: Ferrovia

Sun, 16 Dec 1979	Diabos Negros	0–4	Desp da Chela	N'dalatando
16:00			Lucas; Ernesto (o.g.) Dias

Round 7

Sun, 20 Jan 1980	Makotas de Malange	0–1	Nacional Benguela	Malanje
16:00

Sat, 19 Jan 1980	Sassamba da LS	0–1	Ferroviário da Huíla	Saurimo
16:00

Sun, 20 Jan 1980	Desp da Chela	4–0	Diabos Negros	N'dalatando
16:00

Round 3

Sat, 22 Dec 1979	Sassamba da LS	0–2	Desp da Chela	Saurimo
16:00

Sun 23 Dec 1979	Makotas de Malange	3–1	Diabos Negros	Malanje
16:00

Sun, 23 Dec 1979	Ferroviário da Huíla	3–2	Nacional Benguela	Lubango
16:00				Stadium: Ferrovia

Round 8

Sat, 26 Jan 1980	Desp da Chela	3–0	Sassamba da LS	Lubango
16:00

Sun, 27 Jan 1980	Diabos Negros	1–2	Makotas de Malange	N'dalatando
16:00	? 76'		35' Tuia; 54' Luís	Stadium: Estádio da Revolução

Sun, 27 Jan 1980	Nacional Benguela	1–0	Ferroviário da Huíla	Benguela
16:00	Quim			Stadium: São Filipe; Referee: Dionísio de Almeida

Round 4

Sat, 29 Dec 1979	Nacional Benguela	3–0	Sassamba da LS	Saurimo
16:00	Samuel 23' (pen.), 48'; Calaca 90'			Stadium: São Filipe; Referee: Júlio de Aveiro

Sun 30 Dec 1979	Diabos Negros	1–2	Ferroviário da Huíla	N'dalatando
16:00

Sun, 30 Dec 1979	Desp da Chela	5–2	Makotas de Malange	Lubango
16:00

Round 9

Sat, 2 Feb 1980	Sassamba da LS	0–3	Nacional Benguela	Saurimo
16:00

Sun, 3 Feb 1980	Ferroviário da Huíla	2–0	Diabos Negros	Lubango
16:00				Stadium: Ferrovia

Sun, 3 Feb 1980	Makotas de Malange	0–0	Desp da Chela	Malanje
16:00				Stadium: S.Filipe

Round 5

Sat, 5 Jan 1980	Sassamba da LS	2–1	Makotas de Malange	Saurimo
16:00

Sun 6 Jan 1980	Ferroviário da Huíla	0–0	Desp da Chela	Lubango
16:00				Stadium: Ferrovia

Sun, 6 Jan 1980	Diabos Negros	1–2	Nacional Benguela	N'dalatando
16:00

Round 10

Sun, 10 Feb 1980	Makotas de Malange	0–0	Sassamba da LS	Malanje
16:00

Sun, 10 Feb 1980	Desp da Chela	1–2	Ferroviário da Huíla	Lubango
16:00

Sun, 10 Feb 1980	Nacional Benguela	6–1	Diabos Negros	Benguela
16:00				Stadium: São Filipe

==== Table and results ====
Pos	Team	Pld	W	D	L	GF	GA	GD	Pts	Qualification or relegation	NAC	FER	DCH	SAS	MAK	DNE
1	Nacional de Benguela	10	8	1	1	23	7	+16	17	Semi-finals		1–0	2–0	3–0	2–1	6–1
2	Ferroviário da Huíla	10	7	2	1	13	6	+7	16		3–2		0–0	0–0	1–0	2–0
3	Desportivo da Chela	10	5	3	2	20	7	+13	13		1–1	1–2		3–0	5–2	4–0
4	Sassamba da Lunda Sul	10	2	3	5	4	14	−10	7		0–3	0–1	0–2		2–1	2–1
5	Makotas de Malanje	10	2	2	6	10	15	−5	6		0–1	1–2	0–0	0–0		3–1
6	Diabos Negros de Ndalatando	10	0	1	9	6	27	−21	1		1–2	1–2	0–4	0–0	1–2	

Updated to match(es) played on 10 February 1980. Source: Girabola.com
Rules for classification: 1) Points; 2) Head-to-head points; 3) Head-to-head goal difference; 4) Goal difference; 5) Goals scored; 6) Fair-play points; 7) Play-off.

=== Serie D ===
Round 1

Sun, 9 Dec 1979	Diabos Verdes	5–1	Naval do KS	Luanda
16:00	J.Machado; Gino		Papagaio	Stadium: Coqueiros; Referee: António Costa, Joaquim Oliveira, João Santos

Sun, 9 Dec 1979	Desp de Xangongo	0–2	Estrela Vermelha	Ondjiva
16:00

Sun, 9 Dec 1979	TAAG	3–0	Ginásio do KK	Luanda
16:00	Tó Zé 27'; Ndisso; Geovetty			Stadium: Coqueiros

Round 6

Sun, 13 Jan 1980	Naval de P.A.	2–4	Diabos Verdes	Ngunza
16:00

Sun, 13 Jan 1980	Estrela Vermelha	7–2	Desp de Xangongo	Huambo
16:00	Leitão 10'; Rafael; S^{to} António; Maria		Paím	Stadium: Cacilhas; Referee: Sebastião Reis, Mário Lemos, Zeca Lemos

Sat, 16 Feb 1980	Ginásio do KK	0–5	TAAG	Menongue
15:30

Round 2

Sun, 16 Dec 1979	Ginásio do KK	0–2	Diabos Verdes	Menongue
16:00

Sun, 16 Dec 1979	Estrela Vermelha	2–0	Naval de P.A.	Huambo
16:00				Stadium: Cacilhas

Sun, 16 Dec 1979	Desp de Xangongo	0–4	TAAG	Ondjiva
16:00			Tó Zé; Chinguito

Round 7

Sat, 19 Jan 1980	Diabos Verdes	1–1	Ginásio do KK	Luanda
20:00	J.Machado 50'		40' Van-Dúnem	Stadium: Coqueiros; Referee: Luís Mac-Mahon

Sun, 20 Jan 1980	Naval de P.A.	3–4	Estrela Vermelha	Ngunza
16:00	Chico (?); Paulino (?)		S^{to} António (?)	Referee: Fausto Pires

Sat, 23 Feb 1980	TAAG	11–0	Desp de Xangongo	Luanda
20:00	Geovetty 11', 17' (?); Nito 33' (?); Beny 45' (?); Juca 47' (?); Jujú 59'			Stadium: Coqueiros

Round 3

Sat, 22 Dec 1979	Ginásio do KK	0–2	Estrela Vermelha	Menongue
16:00

Sun, 23 Dec 1979	Naval de P.A.	4–0	Desp de Xangongo	Ngunza
16:00

Sun, 23 Dec 1979	TAAG	2–1	Diabos Verdes	Luanda
16:00	Beny 17'; Rola 90+4'		67' Gino	Stadium: Cidadela; Referee: Manuel Patriota

Round 8

Sun, 27 Jan 1980	Estrela Vermelha	0–0	Ginásio do KK	Huambo
16:00				Stadium: Cacilhas

Sat, 26 Jan 1980	Desp de Xangongo	1–2	Naval de P.A.	Ondjiva
16:00

Sun, 27 Jan 1980	Diabos Verdes	5–0	TAAG	Luanda
16:00	Varela (red card); Gino 53'; J.Machado 65', 67', 85'; Dianingana (?)		(red card) Chinguito	Stadium: Cidadela; Referee: Fausto Pires

Round 4

Sun, 30 Dec 1979	Naval de P.A.	2–5	TAAG	Ngunza
16:00

Sun, 30 Dec 1979	Desp de Xangongo	0–1	Ginásio do KK	Ondjiva
16:00

Sun, 30 Dec 1979	Diabos Verdes	2–0	Estrela Vermelha	Luanda
16:00

Round 9

Sun, 3 Feb 1980	TAAG	4–1	Naval de P.A.	Luanda
16:00	Ndisso 7'; Juca 18'; Nito 36' ? 85' (o.g.)		60' Chico	Stadium: Coqueiros

Sat, 2 Feb 1980	Ginásio do KK	5–1	Desp de Xangongo	Menongue
16:00

Sun, 3 Feb 1980	Estrela Vermelha	2–0	Diabos Verdes	Huambo
16:00	S^{to} António			Stadium: Cacilhas

Round 5

Sun, 6 Jan 1980	Estrela Vermelha	1–0	TAAG	Huambo
16:00	Sto António 74'			Stadium: Cacilhas; Referee: António da Costa, Afonso Milagre, Amadeu Santos

Sat, 5 Jan 1980	Diabos Verdes	8–0	Desp de Xangongo	Luanda
20:00				Stadium: Coqueiros

Sun, 6 Jan 1980	Ginásio do KK	2–0	Naval de P.A.	Menongue
16:00

Round 10

Sun, 10 Feb 1980	TAAG	3–0	Estrela Vermelha	Luanda
16:00	Ndisso 35'; Beny 57'; Ernesto 77'			Referee: Júlio de Aveiro, Carlos Zacarias, Jorge Vigário

Sat, 9 Feb 1980	Desp de Xangongo	2–4	Diabos Verdes	Ondjiva
16:00

Sun, 10 Feb 1980	Naval de P.A.	5–1	Ginásio do KK	Ngunza
16:00

==== Table and results ====
Pos	Team	Pld	W	D	L	GF	GA	GD	Pts	Qualification or relegation	TAA	DVE	EST	GIN	NAV	DXA
1	Desportivo da TAAG	10	8	0	2	37	8	+29	16	Semi-finals		2–1	3–0	3–0	4–1	11–0
2	Diabos Verdes	10	7	1	2	32	10	+22	15		5–0		2–0	1–1	5–1	8–0
3	Estrela Vermelha do Huambo	10	7	1	2	20	10	+10	15		1–0	2–0		0–0	2–0	7–2
4	Ginásio do Cuando Cubango	10	3	2	5	10	19	−9	8		0–5	0–2	0–2		2–0	5–1
5	Naval de Porto Amboim	10	3	0	7	18	28	−10	6		0–5	2–4	3–4	5–1		4–0
6	Desportivo de Xangongo	10	0	0	10	6	48	−42	0		0–4	2–4	0–2	0–1	1–2	

Updated to match(es) played on 10 February 1980. Source: Girabola.com
Rules for classification: 1) Points; 2) Head-to-head points; 3) Head-to-head goal difference; 4) Goal difference; 5) Goals scored; 6) Fair-play points; 7) Play-off.

== Semi finals ==
Sun, 2 Mar 1980	Palancas do Huambo	3–1	Nacional de Benguela	Cacilhas, Huambo
15:00	Rafael 24'; Kumandala 66'; Diamantino 84'		89' Samuel	Referee: Mário da Ressurreição

Sun, 9 Mar 1980	Nacional de Benguela	5–0	Palancas do Huambo	Benguela
15:00				Referee: Júlio de Aveiro; Carlos Zacarias, Jorge Figarro

Sun, 2 Mar 1980	TAAG	2–1	1º de Agosto	Cidadela, Luanda
15:00	Gonçalves 65'; Chinguito 83'		20' (pen.) Lourenço	Referee: Jorge Adriano

Sun, 9 Mar 1980	1º de Agosto	1–0	TAAG	Ferrovia, Lubango
15:00	Amândio 23' (pen.)			Referee: Manuel Pimentel; Sebastião Reis, Berlas dos Santos

Sun, 16 Mar 1980	TAAG	0–2	1º de Agosto	Cidadela, Luanda
15:30			Amândio; Sansão	Referee: Júlio de Aveiro

== Final ==
Sun, 23 Mar 1980
15:00

Primeiro de Agosto	2–1	Nacional de Benguela
Ndunguidi 60'; Sansão 85'		68' Quim

Estádio da Cidadela, Luanda
Attendance: 35,000
Referee: Dionísio de Almeida

D'Agosto	Nacional

GK	''–	(Angola) Ângelo
RB	–	(Angola) Lourenço (c)
CB	–	(Angola) Mascarenhas
CB	–	(Angola) Ndongala
LB	–	(Angola) Agostinho
RM	–	(Angola) Amândio
CM	–	(Angola) Zeca
LM	–	(Angola) Chimalanga	Substituted off
FW	–	(Angola) Ndunguidi
FW	–	(Angola) Túbia
FW	–	(Angola) Vieira Dias	Substituted off
Substitutions:
MF	–	(Angola) Mateus César	Substituted on
MF	–	(Angola) Sansão	Substituted on
Manager:
(Socialist Federal Republic of Yugoslavia) Ivan Ridanović

GK	–	(Angola) Pinto Leite
RB	–	(Angola) Moio
CB	–	(Angola) Canducho
CB	–	(Angola) Barros
LB	–	(Angola) Benchimol (c)
RM	–	(Angola) Leandro
CM	–	(Angola) Lino
LM	–	(Angola) Quim
FW	–	(Angola) Nelson
FW	–	(Angola) Samuel
FW	–	(Angola) Silva	Substituted off
Substitutions:
FW	–	(Angola) Minguito	Substituted on
FW	–	(Angola)
Manager:
(Angola) Amílcar dos Santos

Assistant referees:
Pereira Lopes
Manuel Pimentel

=== Trivia ===
At 15 minutes of play into the final, the referee stopped the match for the public to greet president José Eduardo dos Santos, who had arrived at the stadium.

== Season statistics ==
=== Top scorer ===
- (Angola) João Machado

=== Most goals scored in a single match ===
Player	For	Against	Result	Round	Date
4 goals (Poker)
(Angola) João Machado	Diabos Verdes	Naval P.A.	5-1	2	Sun, 9 Dec 1979
(Angola) Geovetty	Desp. da TAAG	Desp. de Xangongo	11-0	10	Sat, 23 Feb 1980
3 goals (Hat-trick)
(Angola) Arménio	F.C. do Uíge	F.C. de Cabinda	3-0	1	Sun, 9 Dec 1979
(Angola) Diamantino	Palancas	Juv. do Kunje	6-2	3	Sun, 23 Dec 1979
(Angola) Santo António	Estrela Vermelha	Naval P.A.	3-4	7	Sun, 20 Jan 1980
(Angola) João Machado	Diabos Verdes	Desp. da TAAG	5-0	8	Sun, 27 Jan 1980

== Champions ==
1979 Girabola winner

1st title

Squad: Agostinho, Alves, Amândio, Ângelo, Barros, Chimalanga, Garcia, José Luís, Julião, Júlio Mendes, Lourenço, Luvambo, Manico, Manuel Neto, Mascarenhas, Mateus, Mesquita, Napoleão, Ndongala, Ndunguidi, Rosinha, Sabino, Sansão, Túbia, Vieira Dias, Zeca
Head coach: Nicola Berardinelli

== See also ==
- Gira Angola
