= 1984 Girabola =

Girabola 1984
- Season: 1984 (–)
- Champions: Petro Luanda
- Relegated: M.C.H. Nacional; Progresso
- 1985 African Cup of Champions Clubs: Petro Luanda (Girabola winner)
- Matches: 182
- Top goalscorer: Jesus (22 goals)

The 1984 Girabola was the sixth season of top-tier football competition in Angola. Estrela Clube Primeiro de Maio were the defending champions.

The league comprised 14 teams, the bottom three of which were relegated.

Petro de Luanda were crowned champions, winning their 2nd title, while M.C.H. do Uíge, Nacional de Benguela and Progresso do Sambizanga were relegated.

Osvaldo Saturnino a.k.a. Jesus of Petro de Luanda finished as the top scorer with 22 goals.

== Changes from the 1983 season ==
Relegated: Académica do Lobito, Andorinhas do Sumbe, Construtores de Malanje
Promoted: Ferroviário da Huíla, M.C.H. do Uíge, Sagrada Esperança

Locations of the 1984 Girabola teams

== League table ==
| Pos | Team | Pld | W | D | L | GF | GA | GD | Pts | Qualification or relegation |
|---|---|---|---|---|---|---|---|---|---|---|
| 1 | Petro de Luanda (C) | 25 | 12 | 8 | 5 | 44 | 27 | +17 | 32 | Qualification for Champions Cup |
| 2 | Inter de Luanda (Note: Name later changed to Interclube) | 26 | 12 | 8 | 6 | 37 | 28 | +9 | 32 | |
| 3 | Primeiro de Maio | 24 | 11 | 7 | 6 | 32 | 25 | +7 | 29 | |
| 4 | Sagrada Esperança | 23 | 10 | 7 | 6 | 38 | 26 | +12 | 27 | |
| 5 | Primeiro de Agosto | 25 | 10 | 6 | 9 | 36 | 27 | +9 | 26 | |
| 6 | Mambroa (Note: Name later reverted to its original Benfica do Huambo) | 24 | 9 | 8 | 7 | 27 | 24 | +3 | 26 | |
| 7 | Desportivo da Chela (Note: Name later reverted to its original Benfica do Lubango) | 23 | 10 | 5 | 8 | 31 | 25 | +6 | 25 | |
| 8 | Petro do Huambo | 21 | 8 | 9 | 4 | 26 | 21 | +5 | 25 | |
| 9 | Ferroviário da Huíla | 23 | 6 | 7 | 10 | 23 | 34 | −11 | 19 | |
| 10 | Desportivo da TAAG (Note: Name later reverted to its original ASA) | 25 | 7 | 7 | 11 | 25 | 32 | −7 | 21 | |
| 11 | Desportivo de Benguela (Note: Name later reverted to its original Sporting de Benguela) | 23 | 6 | 7 | 10 | 22 | 33 | −11 | 19 | |
| 12 | Nacional de Benguela (R) | 24 | 6 | 7 | 11 | 17 | 33 | −16 | 19 | Relegation to Provincial stages |
| 13 | Progresso do Sambizanga (R) | 23 | 4 | 7 | 12 | 29 | 39 | −10 | 15 | Relegation to Provincial stages |
| 14 | Construtores do Uíge (R) | 19 | 5 | 3 | 11 | 18 | 31 | −13 | 13 | Relegation to Provincial stages |

Updated to match(es) played on 22 November 1984. Source: Girabola.com
Rules for classification: 1) Points; 2) Head-to-head points; 3) Head-to-head goal difference; 4) Goal difference; 5) Goals scored; 6) Fair-play points; 7) Play-off.
(C) Champions; (R) Relegated

== Results ==
| Home \ Away | COU | DBG | DCH | DTA | FHL | INT | MAM | NAC | PET | PHU | PRI | PRM | PRO | SAG |
|---|---|---|---|---|---|---|---|---|---|---|---|---|---|---|
| Construtores do Uíge | — | 2–3 | 2–3 | 1–1 | 0–3 | 1–0 | 2–0 | 0–0 | 1–2 | | 1–2 | 1–0 | | |
| Desportivo de Benguela | 0–1 | — | 1–3 | 1–0 | 0–0 | 2–1 | 0–0 | 3–0 | 1–1 | 1–3 | 1–3 | 0–0 | 1–1 | |
| Desportivo da Chela | | | — | 2–0 | 4–0 | 1–3 | 2–0 | 2–0 | 0–1 | 0–1 | 2–0 | 0–0 | 2–0 | 1–1 |
| Desportivo da TAAG | 1–1 | 4–0 | 2–1 | — | 2–1 | 2–1 | 0–0 | 2–0 | 3–0 | 1–1 | 0–4 | 0–2 | 2–3 | 0–5 |
| Ferroviário da Huíla | | | 0–0 | 0–0 | — | 1–0 | 2–2 | 0–0 | | 1–2 | 0–2 | 4–2 | 2–2 | 0–2 |
| Inter de Luanda | 2–0 | 2–1 | 3–1 | 2–1 | 2–0 | — | 1–0 | 1–1 | 1–2 | 0–0 | 3–2 | 1–1 | 1–1 | 2–0 |
| Mambroa | 3–0 | 1–1 | 2–1 | 1–0 | 3–1 | 1–2 | — | | 1–0 | 0–1 | 2–2 | 0–0 | 2–0 | 1–0 |
| Nacional de Benguela | | 1–1 | 1–3 | 1–0 | 1–2 | 0–0 | 1–0 | — | 1–0 | 2–0 | 0–0 | 1–4 | 0–2 | 2–0 |
| Petro de Luanda | 4–2 | 5–0 | 4–0 | 0–0 | 3–1 | 4–1 | 2–2 | | — | 1–1 | 1–0 | 4–0 | 1–1 | 1–1 |
| Petro do Huambo | | 0–2 | | 0–0 | 0–0 | 2–2 | | 4–1 | 1–2 | — | 1–0 | | 1–1 | 1–1 |
| Primeiro de Agosto | 1–0 | 1–0 | 1–2 | 1–2 | 1–2 | 1–1 | 4–2 | 0–0 | 0–1 | 1–0 | — | 1–2 | 3–1 | 3–0 |
| Primeiro de Maio | 2–1 | 1–0 | 2–0 | 2–1 | 1–0 | 1–2 | 0–0 | 1–0 | 1–1 | 1–2 | 2–2 | — | 4–1 | 0–1 |
| Progresso do Sambizanga | 1–2 | 1–2 | 1–1 | | 1–2 | 1–2 | 0–1 | 4–1 | 3–2 | 2–3 | 1–1 | | — | 0–1 |
| Sagrada Esperança | 3–0 | 2–1 | 0–0 | 2–1 | 4–1 | 1–1 | 2–3 | 4–0 | 2–2 | 2–2 | | 2–3 | 2–1 | — |

Updated to match(es) played on 22 November 1984. Source: girabola.com
Legend: Blue = home team win; Yellow = draw; Red = away team win.

== Season statistics ==
=== Scorers ===
R/T
| R/T | COU | DBG | DCH | DTA | FHL | INT | MAM | NAC | PET | PHU | PRI | PRM | PRO | SAG | TOTAL |
|---|---|---|---|---|---|---|---|---|---|---|---|---|---|---|---|
| 1 | 11/3/84 | 11/3/84 | 7/6/84 | 11/3/84 | 11/3/84 | 11/3/84 | 10/3/84 | 7/6/84 | 11/3/84 | 11/3/84 | 11/3/84 | 11/3/84 | 11/3/84 | 10/3/84 | 23 |
| 1 | COU–DBG 2–3; Carlitos x2 | COU–DBG 2–3; Enoque ' Nelson ' Walsh ' | NAC–DCH 1–3 | FHL–DTA 0–0 | FHL–DTA 0–0 | INT–PET 1–2; Mendinho 55' | SAG–MAM 2–3; Ed.Machado x2 Julião ' | NAC–DCH 1–3 | INT–PET 1–2; Jesus x2 | PHU–PRO 1–1; Saavedra 60' | PRM–PRI 2–2; Ndunguidi ' Vieira Dias ' | PRM–PRI 2–2 | PHU–PRO 1–1; Santinho 53' | SAG–MAM 2–3; Quintino 4' 28' | 23 |
| 2 | 17/3/84 | 17/3/84 | 17/3/84 | 17/3/84 | 9/6/84 | 18/3/84 | 18/3/84 | | | 18/3/84 | 17/3/84 | 18/3/84 | 17/3/84 | 9/6/84 | 17 |
| 2 | PRI–COU 1–0 | DBG–PRO 1–1; Enoque ' | DCH–DTA 2–0 | DCH–DTA 2–0 | SAG–FHL 4–1; Portela ' | PHU–INT 2–2; Túbia 3'; Mendinho 80' | PRM–MAM 0–0 | PET–NAC 0–3 | PET–NAC 0–3; Jesus x2 | PHU–INT 2–2; Saavedra 2'; Tony 85' | PRI–COU 1–0; Vieira Dias 87' | PRM–MAM 0–0 | DBG–PRO 1–1; Salviano ' | SAG–FHL 4–1; Quintino ' Rui Paulino x2 Serginho ' | 17 |
| 3 | 25/3/84 | 23/3/84 | 25/3/84 | 25/3/84 | 25/3/84 | 23/3/84 | 25/3/84 | 25/3/84 | 9/5/84 | 9/5/84 | 25/3/84 | 25/3/84 | 25/3/84 | 25/3/84 | 17 |
| 3 | MAM–COU 3–0 | INT–DBG 2–1; Babá 47' | SAG–DCH 0–0 | NAC–DTA 1–0 | FHL–PRM 4–2 | INT–DBG 2–1; Quinito ' Túbia ' | MAM–COU 3–0; Capusso 25'; Julião 62'; Ed.Machado 80' | NAC–DTA 1–0 | PET–PHU 1–1; Jesus 55' | PET–PHU 1–1; Bito ' | PRO–PRI 1–1; Ivo 2' | FHL–PRM 4–2 | PRO–PRI 1–1; Matateu 37' | SAG–DCH 0–0 | 17 |
| 4 | 1/4/84 | 1/4/84 | 31/3/84 | 31/3/84 | 1/4/84 | 1/4/84 | 1/4/84 | 31/3/84 | 1/4/84 | 31/3/84 | 1/4/84 | 31/3/84 | 1/4/84 | 31/3/84 | 16 |
| 4 | COU–FHL 0–3 | DBG–PET 1–1; Enoque 15' | DCH–PRM 0–0 | DTA–SAG 0–5 | COU–FHL 0–3 | PRI–INT 1–1; Mendinho 87' | MAM–PRO 2–0; Maria ' | NAC–PHU 2–0; Moio 11'; Armindo 42' | DBG–PET 1–1; Abel Campos 69' | NAC–PHU 2–0 | PRI–INT 1–1; Vieira Dias 74' | DCH–PRM 0–0 | MAM–PRO 2–0 | DTA–SAG 0–5 | 16 |
| 5 | 8/4/84 | 8/4/84 | 8/4/84 | 23/5/84 | 8/4/84 | 7/4/84 | 7/4/84 | 8/4/84 | 8/4/84 | 8/4/84 | 8/4/84 | 23/5/84 | 8/4/84 | 8/4/84 | 18 |
| 5 | COU–DCH 2–3 | PHU–DBG 0–2 | COU–DCH 2–3 | PRM–DTA 2–1; Coreano ' | FHL–PRO 2–2 | INT–MAM 1–0; Mendinho 42'pen. | INT–MAM 1–0 | NAC–SAG 2–0 | PET–PRI 1–0; Abel Campos 73' | PHU–DBG 0–2 | PET–PRI 1–0 | PRM–DTA 2–1; Maluka ' Sarmento ' | FHL–PRO 2–2 | NAC–SAG 2–0 | 18 |
| 6 | 13/4/84 | 15/4/84 | 15/4/84 | 13/4/84 | 14/4/84 | 14/4/84 | 15/4/84 | 15/4/84 | 15/4/84 | 15/4/84 | 15/4/84 | 14/4/84 | 15/4/84 | 14/4/84 | 16 |
| 6 | DTA–COU 1–1 | DBG–NAC 3–0 | DCH–PRO 2–0 | DTA–COU 1–1 | INT–FHL 2–0 | INT–FHL 2–0; Quinito 47'; Túbia 70' | MAM–PET 1–0; Manuel ' | DBG–NAC 3–0 | MAM–PET 1–0 | PRI–PHU 1–0 | PRI–PHU 1–0; Ivo ' | SAG–PRM 2–3; Garcia 55'; Maluka ' Vicy ' | DCH–PRO 2–0 | SAG–PRM 2–3 | 16 |
| 7 | 22/4/84 | 21/4/84 | 21/4/84 | 22/4/84 | 22/4/84 | 21/4/84 | 22/4/84 | 1/5/84 | 22/4/84 | 22/4/84 | 21/4/84 | 1/5/84 | 22/4/84 | 22/4/84 | |
| 7 | COU–SAG – | DBG–PRI 1–3; Didí ' | INT–DCH 3–1; Toninho ' | PRO–DTA – | FHL–PET – | INT–DCH 3–1; Quinito ' Túbia x2 | PHU–MAM – | NAC–PRM 1–4; Armindo ' | FHL–PET – | PHU–MAM – | DBG–PRI 1–3; Ndunguidi ' Vieira Dias x2 | NAC–PRM 1–4; Sarmento x2 Vicy x2 | PRO–DTA – | COU–SAG – | |
| 8 | 28/4/84 | 28/4/8429/4/84 | 29/4/84 | 28/4/84 | 29/4/84 | 28/4/84 | 29/4/84 | 28/4/84 | 29/4/84 | 29/4/84 | 28/4/84 | 28/4/84 | 28/4/84 | 28/4/84 | 18 |
| 8 | PRM–COU 2–1; Maradona ' | MAM–DBG 1–1; Varela '15 | PET–DCH 4–0 | DTA–INT 2–1; Vieira Dias 53'; Coreano 71' | FHL–PHU 1–2 | DTA–INT 2–1; Quinito 50' | MAM–DBG 1–1; Manuel ' | PRI–NAC 0–0 | PET–DCH 4–0; Abel 8'; Dico ' Wilson 89' | FHL–PHU 1–2 | PRI–NAC 0–0 | PRM–COU 2–1; Garcia ' Maluka ' | SAG–PRO 2–1; Santinho ' | SAG–PRO 2–1; Quintino ' | 18 |
| 9 | 6/5/84 | 6/5/84 | 6/5/84 | 4/5/84 | 6/5/84 | 5/5/84 | 5/5/84 | 6/5/84 | 4/5/84 | 6/5/84 | 5/5/84 | 6/5/84 | 6/5/84 | 5/5/84 | |
| 9 | NAC–COU – | FHL–DBG – | PHU–DCH – | DTA–PET 3–0; Chico Dinis pen. Gonçalves x2 | FHL–DBG – | SAG–INT 1–1; Mendinho ' | PRI–MAM 4–2; Manuel ' | NAC–COU – | DTA–PET 3–0 | PHU–DCH – | PRI–MAM 4–2; Alves ' Ivo ' Ndunguidi ' Nsuka ' | PRO–PRM – | PRO–PRM – | SAG–INT 1–1; Abreu ' | |
| 10 | 13/5/84 | 13/5/84 | 13/5/84 | 13/5/84 | 30/5/84 | 12/5/84 | 12/5/84 | 12/5/84 | 23/5/84 | 13/5/84 | 30/5/84 | 12/5/84 | 13/5/84 | 23/5/84 | |
| 10 | COU–PRO – | DCH–DBG – | DCH–DBG – | DTA–PHU 1–1; Meco pen. | PRI–FHL 1–2; Emílio 7'; Barbosa ' | PRM–INT 1–2; Mendinho ' Quinito ' | MAM–NAC – | MAM–NAC – | PET–SAG 1–1; Jesus 85' | DTA–PHU 1–1; Mateus ' | PRI–FHL 1–2; Emílio o.g. | PRM–INT 1–2; Sarmento ' | COU–PRO – | PET–SAG 1–1; Quintino 1' | |
| 11 | 19/5/84 | 18/5/84 | 19/5/84 | 18/5/84 | 20/5/84 | 19/5/84 | 20/5/84 | 20/5/84 | 7/6/84 | 20/5/84 | 19/5/84 | 7/6/84 | 20/5/84 | 20/5/84 | 19 |
| 11 | INT–COU 2–0 | DBG–DTA 1–0; Enoque ' | PRI–DCH 1–2; Basílio ' Docas ' | DBG–DTA 1–0 | FHL–MAM 2–2 | INT–COU 2–0; Mingo ' Quinito ' | FHL–MAM 2–2 | PRO–NAC 4–1 | PRM–PET 1–1; Lufemba ' | PHU–SAG 1–1 | PRI–DCH 1–2; Ndunguidi ' | PRM–PET 1–1; Vicy ' | PRO–NAC 4–1 | PHU–SAG 1–1 | 19 |
| 12 | 27/5/84 | 27/5/84 | 27/5/84 | 27/5/84 | 27/5/84 | 26/5/84 | 27/5/84 | 27/5/84 | 27/5/84 | 27/5/84 | 27/5/84 | 27/5/84 | 26/5/84 | 27/5/84 | 19 |
| 12 | COU–PET 1–2; Riva ' | SAG–DBG 2–1 | MAM–DCH 2–1; Basílio 20' | DTA–PRI 0–4 | FHL–NAC 0–0 | PRO–INT 1–2; Quinito 15'; Mendinho 25'pen. | MAM–DCH 2–1; Manuel ' Capusso 89' | FHL–NAC 0–0 | COU–PET 1–2; Jesus ' Wilson ' | PRM–PHU 1–2; Picas 39' 90+3' | DTA–PRI 0–4; Alves 15'; Vieira Dias 25' ? Ndunguidi 80' | PRM–PHU 1–2; Maluka 71' | PRO–INT 1–2; Betinho 46' | SAG–DBG 2–1 | 19 |
| 13 | 3/6/84 | 12/6/84 | 3/6/84 | 2/6/84 | 3/6/84 | 3/6/84 | 2/6/84 | 3/6/84 | 3/6/84 | 3/6/84 | 2/6/84 | 12/6/84 | 3/6/84 | 2/6/84 | |
| 13 | COU–PHU – | DBG–PRM 0–0 | DCH–FHL 4–0 | MAM–DTA 1–0 | DCH–FHL 4–0 | NAC–INT 0–0 | MAM–DTA 1–0; Manuel 36' | NAC–INT 0–0 | PET–PRO 1–1 | COU–PHU – | PRI–SAG 3–0; Nsuka 5'; Alves 33'; Ndunguidi 73' | DBG–PRM 0–0 | PET–PRO 1–1 | PRI–SAG 3–0 | |
| 14 | 22/7/84 | 22/7/84 | 22/7/84 | 20/7/84 | 20/7/84 | 21/7/84 | 22/7/84 | 22/7/84 | 21/7/84 | 21/7/84 | 22/7/84 | 22/7/84 | 21/7/84 | 22/7/84 | 20 |
| 14 | DBG–COU 0–1 | DBG–COU 0–1 | DCH–NAC 2–0 | DTA–FHL 2–1; Coreano ' Luntadila ' | DTA–FHL 2–1; Barbosa ' | PET–INT 4–1; Mendinho 11' | MAM–SAG 1–0; Julião 8' | DCH–NAC 2–0 | PET–INT 4–1; Jesus 10' 25' 35'; Antoninho 65' | PRO–PHU 2–3; Almeida 40'; Aníbal 57'; Saavedra 65' | PRI–PRM 1–2; Mané 12' | PRI–PRM 1–2; Sarmento 56'; Maluka 70' | PRO–PHU 2–3; Santinho 26'; Rola 90' | MAM–SAG 1–0 | 20 |
| 15 | 29/8/84 | 28/7/84 | 28/7/84 | 28/7/84 | 29/7/84 | 15/8/84 | 29/7/84 | 29/7/84 | 29/7/84 | 15/8/84 | 29/8/84 | 29/7/84 | 28/7/84 | 29/7/84 | 12 |
| 15 | COU–PRI 1–2 | PRO–DBG 1–2 | DTA–DCH 2–1; Toninho 85' | DTA–DCH 2–1; Chico Dinis 70'; Luntadila 90' | FHL–SAG 0–2 | INT–PHU 0–0 | MAM–PRM 0–0 | NAC–PET 1–0 | NAC–PET 1–0 | INT–PHU 0–0 | COU–PRI 1–2 | MAM–PRM 0–0 | PRO–DBG 1–2 | FHL–SAG 0–2; Quintino 20' 21' | 12 |
| 16 | 26/9/84 | 26/9/84 | 16/9/84 | 4/8/84 | 5/8/84 | 26/9/84 | 26/9/84 | 4/8/84 | 29/8/84 | 29/8/84 | 21/8/84 | 5/8/84 | 21/8/84 | 16/9/84 | 17 |
| 16 | COU–MAM 2–0 | DBG–INT 2–1 | DCH–SAG 1–1; Arsénio ' | DTA–NAC 2–0; Meco 17'; Vieira Dias 90' | PRM–FHL 1–0 | DBG–INT 2–1; Mingo ' | COU–MAM 2–0 | DTA–NAC 2–0 | PHU–PET 1–2 | PHU–PET 1–2 | PRI–PRO 3–1; Ndunguidi x2 Nsuka ' | PRM–FHL 1–0 | PRI–PRO 3–1; Gaspar ' | DCH–SAG 1–1; Abreu 80' | 17 |
| 17 | 31/10/84 | 11/8/84 | 12/8/84 | 12/8/84 | 31/10/84 | 12/8/84 | 12/8/84 | 12/8/84 | 11/8/84 | 12/8/84 | 12/8/84 | 12/8/84 | 12/8/84 | 12/8/84 | |
| 17 | FHL–COU – | PET–DBG 5–0 | PRM–DCH 2–0 | SAG–DTA 2–1; Coreano ' | FHL–COU – | INT–PRI 3–2; Quinito 17'; Mingo 38' 70' | PRO–MAM 0–1; Ed.Machado 50' | PHU–NAC 4–1 | PET–DBG 5–0; Abel Campos ' Jesus x4 | PHU–NAC 4–1 | INT–PRI 3–2; Alves 6'; Barros ' | PRM–DCH 2–0 | PRO–MAM 0–1 | SAG–DTA 2–1; Abreu ' Vicky ' | |
| 18 | 19/8/84 | 19/8/84 | 19/8/84 | 19/8/84 | 18/8/84 | 19/8/84 | 19/8/84 | 18/8/84 | 18/8/84 | 19/8/84 | 18/8/84 | 19/8/84 | 18/8/84 | 18/8/84 | |
| 18 | DCH–COU – | DBG–PHU 1–3 | DCH–COU – | DTA–PRM 0–2 | PRO–FHL 1–2; Barbosa ' Raimundo ' | MAM–INT 1–2 | MAM–INT 1–2 | SAG–NAC 4–0 | PRI–PET 0–1; Jesus 39' | DBG–PHU 1–3 | PRI–PET 0–1 | DTA–PRM 0–2; Maluka 12' ? | PRO–FHL 1–2; Gaspar ' | SAG–NAC 4–0; Joãozinho x2 Quintino ' Serginho ' | |
| 19 | 26/8/84 | 25/8/84 | 25/8/84 | 26/8/84 | 26/8/84 | 26/8/84 | 26/8/84 | 25/8/84 | 26/8/84 | 26/8/84 | 26/8/84 | 26/8/84 | 25/8/84 | 26/8/84 | 13 |
| 19 | COU–DTA 1–1 | NAC–DBG 1–1; Enoque 75' | PRO–DCH 1–1; Currula 88' | COU–DTA 1–1 | FHL–INT 1–0; Zezinho 72' | FHL–INT 1–0 | PET–MAM 2–2; Manuel ' Ralph pen. | NAC–DBG 1–1; Joaquim 17' | PET–MAM 2–2; Abel ' Lufemba ' | PHU–PRI 1–0 | PHU–PRI 1–0 | PRM–SAG 0–1 | PRO–DCH 1–1; Zezinho 70' | PRM–SAG 0–1 | 13 |
| 20 | 1/9/84 | 1/9/84 | 2/9/84 | 2/9/84 | 1/9/84 | 2/9/84 | 2/9/84 | 2/9/84 | 1/9/84 | 2/9/84 | 1/9/84 | 2/9/84 | 2/9/84 | 1/9/84 | 19 |
| 20 | SAG–COU 3–0 | PRI–DBG 1–0 | DCH–INT 1–3; Basílio ' | DTA–PRO 2–3 | PET–FHL 3–1 | DCH–INT 1–3; Mendinho 5'; Raúl 44'; Paciência ' | MAM–PHU 0–1 | PRM–NAC 1–0 | PET–FHL 3–1 | MAM–PHU 0–1; Picas 75' | PRI–DBG 1–0; Ndunguidi ' | PRM–NAC 1–0 | DTA–PRO 2–3 | SAG–COU 3–0 | 19 |
| 21 | 9/9/84 | 9/9/84 | 9/9/84 | 9/9/84 | 9/9/84 | 9/9/84 | 9/9/84 | 8/9/84 | 9/9/84 | 9/9/84 | 8/9/84 | 9/9/84 | 8/9/84 | 8/9/84 | 6 |
| 21 | COU–PRM 1–0 | DBG–MAM 0–0 | DCH–PET 0–1 | INT–DTA 2–1; Saúca 50' | PHU–FHL 0–0 | INT–DTA 2–1; Mingo 43'; Túbia 75' | DBG–MAM 0–0 | NAC–PRI 0–0 | DCH–PET 0–1 | PHU–FHL 0–0 | NAC–PRI 0–0 | COU–PRM 1–0 | PRO–SAG 0–1 | PRO–SAG 0–1; Joãozinho 6' | 6 |
| 22 | 23/9/84 | 22/9/84 | 23/9/84 | 23/9/84 | 22/9/84 | 22/9/84 | 23/9/84 | 23/9/84 | 23/9/84 | 23/9/84 | 23/9/84 | 23/9/84 | 23/9/84 | 22/9/84 | 12 |
| 22 | COU–NAC 0–0 | DBG–FHL 0–0 | DCH–PHU 0–1 | PET–DTA 0–0 | DBG–FHL 0–0 | INT–SAG 2–0; Mingo 30'; Raúl ' | MAM–PRI 2–2 | COU–NAC 0–0 | PET–DTA 0–0 | DCH–PHU 0–1; Aníbal 21' | MAM–PRI 2–2 | PRM–PRO 4–1 | PRM–PRO 4–1 | INT–SAG 2–0 | 12 |
| 23 | 29/9/84 | 30/9/84 | 30/9/84 | 30/9/84 | 30/9/84 | 30/9/84 | 29/9/84 | 29/9/84 | 29/9/84 | 30/9/84 | 30/9/84 | 30/9/84 | 29/9/84 | 29/9/84 | 16 |
| 23 | PRO–COU 1–2; Carlitos ' Lufombo ' | DBG–DCH 1–3 | DBG–DCH 1–3 | PHU–DTA 0–0 | FHL–PRI 0–2 | INT–PRM 1–1; Mingo ' | NAC–MAM 1–0 | NAC–MAM 1–0; Paulino ' | SAG–PET 2–2 | PHU–DTA 0–0 | FHL–PRI 0–2; Mesquita 61'; Amândio 80' | INT–PRM 1–1 | PRO–COU 1–2; Santinho ' | SAG–PET 2–2 | 16 |
| 24 | 7/10/84 | 6/10/84 | 7/10/84 | 6/10/84 | 7/10/84 | 7/10/84 | 7/10/84 | 7/10/84 | 7/10/84 | 6/10/84 | 7/10/84 | 7/10/84 | 7/10/84 | 6/10/84 | 21 |
| 24 | COU–INT 1–0 | DTA–DBG 4–0 | DCH–PRI 2–0; Currula 25'; Basílio 68' | DTA–DBG 4–0; Saúca 36' ? Vieira Dias 52'; Kansas 75' | MAM–FHL 3–1 | COU–INT 1–0 | MAM–FHL 3–1 | NAC–PRO 0–2 | PET–PRM 4–0; Jesus 35'; Antoninho 48' 51' 70' | SAG–PHU 2–2 | DCH–PRI 2–0 | PET–PRM 4–0 | NAC–PRO 0–2 | SAG–PHU 2–2 | 21 |
| 25 | 13/10/84 | 14/10/84 | 14/10/84 | 14/10/84 | 13/10/84 | 13/10/84 | 14/10/84 | 13/10/84 | 13/10/84 | 14/10/84 | 14/10/84 | 14/10/84 | 13/10/84 | 14/10/84 | |
| 25 | PET–COU 4–2; Alea 16'; Malungo 35' | DBG–SAG – | DCH–MAM 2–0; Lucas 50'; Arsénio 76' | PRI–DTA 1–2; Marito 3'; Coreano 69' | NAC–FHL 1–2 | INT–PRO 1–1; Pirocas 75' | DCH–MAM 2–0 | NAC–FHL 1–2 | PET–COU 4–2; Jesus 1' 28' 50' 75' | PHU–PRM – | PRI–DTA 1–2; Tandu 40' | PHU–PRM – | INT–PRO 1–1; Gaspar 8' | DBG–SAG – | |
| 26 | | 27/10/84 | 28/10/84 | 27/10/84 | 28/10/84 | 27/10/84 | 27/10/84 | 27/10/84 | 28/10/84 | | 27/10/84 | 27/10/84 | 28/10/84 | 27/10/84 | |
| 26 | PHU–COU – | PRM–DBG 1–0 | FHL–DCH 0–0 | DTA–MAM 0–0 | FHL–DCH 0–0 | INT–NAC 1–1; Mendinho ' | DTA–MAM 0–0 | INT–NAC 1–1; Rasgado ' | PRO–PET 3–2; Jesus 22'; Lito 25' | PHU–COU – | SAG–PRI – | PRM–DBG 1–0; Vicy ' | PRO–PET 3–2; Santinho 3'pen. Zezinho 51'; Ndombele 65' | SAG–PRI – | |
| T | | | | | | 37 | | | | | | | | | |

=== Most goals scored in a single match ===
As of 13 October 1984

| Player | For | Against | Result | Round | Date |
4 goals (Poker)
| (Angola) Jesus | Petro de Luanda | Desp. de Benguela | 4-0 | 17 | 11 August 1984 |
| (Angola) Jesus | Petro de Luanda | Construtores do Uíge | 4-2 | 25 | 13 October 1984 |
3 goals (Hat-trick)
| (Angola) Jesus | Petro de Luanda | Inter de Luanda | 4-1 | 10 | 21 July 1984 |
| (Angola) Antoninho | Petro de Luanda | 1º de Maio | 4-0 | 24 | 7 October 1984 |

=== Top scorers ===
| Rank | Scorer | Club | Goals |
|---|---|---|---|
| 1 | (Angola) Jesus | Petro de Luanda | 22 |
| 2 | (Angola) Santinho | Progresso do Sambizanga | 17 |
| 3 | (Angola) Maluka | Primeiro de Maio | 16 |
| 4 | (Angola) Quintino | Sagrada Esperança | 13 |
| 5 | (Angola) Barbosa | Ferroviário da Huíla | 12 |
