= S.H. Benfica (Huambo) =

Angolan football club

Benfica do Huambo
- Full name: Sport Huambo e Benfica
- Founded: 29 September 1931; 95 years ago
- Ground: Estádio das Cacilhas; Huambo, Angola
- Capacity: 12.000
- Chairman: Amílcar Kandimba
- Manager: n/a
- League: Segundona
- 2012: 9th (Série B)
Home colours

Sport Huambo e Benfica, originally Sport Nova Lisboa e Benfica or Benfica de Nova Lisboa, later renamed as Sport Huambo e Benfica or Benfica do Huambo or Mambroa, is a football club from Huambo, Angola. The club was established as the then Nova Lisboa affiliate of S.L. Benfica of Portugal, and shares the same colours. The logo is also very similar to the Portuguese one.

In 1972, the club won the Angolan provincial football championship.

Following the country's independence in 1975 and in an attempt by the communist regime to erase all traces of colonial rule, the club which has been created as an affiliate to S.L. Benfica was ordered to change its name and therefore became known as Estrela Vermelha do Huambo (Huambo Red Star) as it participated in the first edition of the country's post-independence premier league and later on to Mambroa. In a General Assembly meeting held on March 10, 1990, the club's name was reverted to its original denomination, and since shortly after independence, the Portuguese-named city of Nova Lisboa had changed to Huambo, so did the club's name.

== Achievements ==
- Angolan League: 1

1972

== Stadium ==
The club is the owner of the 15,000-seat Estádio das Cacilhas stadium. At present, the stadium has been demolished, awaiting government funding for the construction of a new stadium on the same site, with the capacity of 15,000 seats.

== Manager history and performance ==
Season	Coach	L2	L1	C	Coach	L2	L1	C	Coach	L2	L1	C
1979	(Bulgaria) Bogomil Bijev		8th									
1980	(Bulgaria) Bogomil Bijev		3rd									
1981	(Bulgaria) Bogomil Bijev				(Angola) Arlindo Leitão				(Bulgaria) Bogomil Bijev		3rd	
1982	(Croatia) Vidić				(Angola) Daniel Lutucuta		5th					
1983	(Angola) Daniel Lutucuta				(Portugal) Carlos Sério							
1984	(Portugal) Carlos Sério											
1985	(Angola) Daniel Lutucuta				(Angola) Jaime Chimalanga							
1986	(Angola) Filipe Mascarenhas				(Angola) António Mpuissi							
1987	(Angola) Arlindo Leitão											
1988	(Angola) Daniel Lutucuta				(Angola) Laurindo							
1989	(Angola) Zé do Pau											
1990	(Angola) Zé do Pau				(Angola) Laurindo							
1991	(Angola) Horácio Cangato											
1992	(Angola) Carlos Queirós											
1996	(Angola) Horácio Cangato				(Angola) Patrick							
1997	(Angola) Zé do Pau		13th									
2005	(Angola) Napoleão Brandão	2b										
2007	(Angola) António Sayombo †											
2008	(Angola) António Sayombo †	2b										
2009	(Angola) Hélder Teixeira	5b										
2010	(Portugal) António Caldas	3b										
2011	(Angola) Alberto Cardeau	3b		PR								
2012	(Angola) Horácio Libengué	9b										

== See also ==
- Girabola
- Gira Angola
