= Clube Nacional de Benguela =

Angolan sports club

- Full name: Clube Nacional de Benguela
- Nickname: Os Elefantes The Elephants
- Founded: 24 June 1920; 105 years ago
- Ground: Estádio de São Filipe; Estádio de Ombaka; Benguela, Angola
- Capacity: 10,000; 35,000
- Chairman: Ivanir Coelho
- Manager: TBD
- League: Gira Angola
- 2025-26: 3rd (Série A)
Home colours

Clube Nacional de Benguela, founded on June 24, 1920, as Sports Clube Portugal de Benguela or simply Portugal de Benguela, is a sports club from Benguela, Angola. The Elephants won five titles during the then overseas province of Angola. Even before Angola's independence in 1975, the club's name was changed to Sports Club Nacional de Benguela. In 1979, the club, then Clube Nacional de Benguela, was one of the founders of Angola's premier football league (Girabola), in which season it finished as the runner-up by losing to Primeiro de Agosto 2–1 in the final.

The club has been banned by FIFA from entering any official competition until a debt with former coach Álvaro Magalhães is settled.

== Stadium ==
Nacional de Benguela is the owner of Estádio São Filipe.

== Achievements ==
- Angolan League:

- Angolan Cup:

- Angolan SuperCup:

== Manager history and performance ==
Season	Coach	L2	L1	C	Coach	L2	L1	C
1979	(Angola) Amílcar dos Santos		2nd					
1980	(Angola) Amílcar dos Santos		4th					
1981	(Bulgaria) Ventcho Zakariev				(Portugal) Augusto Martins		9th	
1982	(Angola) Rui Amaral				(Angola) Rogério Peyroteo			
1983	(Portugal) Vitor Gonçalves							
1984	(Angola) Rui Amaral							
1991	(Angola) António Lopes Chiby							
1992	(Angola) António Lopes Chiby							
1993	(Angola) António Lopes Chiby							
1994	(Angola) João Melanchton				(Angola) Jorge Pinto Leite			
1995	(Angola) Jorge Pinto Leite							
1996	(Angola) Jorge Pinto Leite				(Angola) Beto Garcia			
2011	(Angola) Osvaldo Roque Joni				(Angola) Jorge Pinto Leite			
2012	(Portugal) Álvaro Magalhães				(Brazil) Luís Mariano			

== See also ==
- Girabola
- Gira Angola
