= Sporting Clube de Luanda =

Angolan sports club

Sporting de Luanda
- Full name: Sporting Clube de Luanda
- Founded: 1920; 105 years ago
- Ground: Estádio dos Coqueiros; Luanda, Angola
- Capacity: 12.000

Sporting Clube de Luanda best known as Sporting de Luanda, is an Angolan multisports club based in Luanda. The club's football team, while being one of the most ancient and traditional clubs in Luanda, has been out of major competition due to financial reasons.

== History ==
The team was founded on 15 August 1920 as the branch number 3 of Lisbon-based Sporting Clube de Portugal (Sporting CP). During the colonial period in Angola, the club won eight times the Angolan Provincial Championship the top division of Angolan football as a Portuguese colony.

Following the country's independence in 1975 and in an attempt by the communist regime to erase all traces of colonial rule, the club which has been created as an affiliate to Sporting Clube de Portugal was ordered to change its name and therefore became known as Diabos Verdes (Green Devils), effective from 31 January 1980. In February 1981, the club's name changed again as Leões de Luanda (Luanda's Lions). On 24 February 1989, with the establishment of democracy, the club was able to reclaim its original name.

== Stadium ==
The team used to play at the 12000 capacity Estádio dos Coqueiros.

== Honours ==
- Angolan Provincial Championship: 1941, 1942, 1944, 1946, 1947, 1955, 1956, 1963

== Manager history ==
| Season | Coach | S | L | C | Coach | S | L | C | Coach | S | L | C |
|---|---|---|---|---|---|---|---|---|---|---|---|---|
| 1979 | (Angola) João Vieira Lopes | | | | | | | | | | | |
| 1980 | (Angola) João Vieira Lopes | | | | | | | | | | | |
| 1981 | (Angola) António Gomes de Oliveira | – | | | (Angola) Passos Carneiro | – | | | (Argentina) Mario Imbelloni | | 10th | |
| 1983 | (Angola) Joaquim da Costa Gegé | | | | | | | | | | | |
| 1984 | (Angola) Joaquim da Costa Gegé | | | | | | | | | | | |
| 1985 | (Angola) Joaquim da Costa Gegé | | | | Joaquim Dinis | | | | | | | |
| 1986 | (Angola) Joaquim Dinis | | | | (Angola) João Machado | | | | | | | |
| 1987 | (Angola) Domingos Inguila | | | | | | | | | | | |
| 1988 | (Angola) Napoleão Brandão | | | | | | | | | | | |
| 1991 | (Angola) Arnaldo Chaves | | | | (Portugal) Victor Gonçalves | | | | | | | |
| 1993 | (Angola) Napoleão Brandão | | | | (Angola) Arnaldo Chaves | | | | | | | |
| 1994 | (Angola) Napoleão Brandão | | | | (Angola) Mário Calado | | | | (Angola) Nando Russo | | | |
| 1995 | (Angola) Manuel Loth | – | | | (Portugal) Jorge Gonçalves | | 12th | | | | | |

== See also ==
- Girabola (1986)
