= Ndunguidi =

Angolan footballer (born 1956)

Daniel Ndunguidi
Personal information
- Full name: Daniel Ndunguidi Gonçalves
- Date of birth: 13 October 1956 (age 70)
- Place of birth: Buco Zau, Cabinda, Angola
- Position: Forward

Senior career*
Years	Team	Apps	(Gls)
- Benfica Luanda
- F.C. Luanda
- 1º de Agosto

International career^{‡}
1978-1991	Angola	44	(9)
- * Club domestic league appearances and goals as of 6 August 2013 ‡ National team caps and goals as of 6 August 2013

Daniel Ndunguidi Gonçalves, better known as Daniel Ndunguidi or simply Ndunguidi, (born 1956) is a former Angolan football player.

Ndunguidi, whose career peaked in the 1980s while playing for Primeiro de Agosto as a forward, is widely considered Angola's most prominent football player, following independence. His fame and talent is only matched by that of Petro Atlético's José Saturnino de Oliveira aka "Jesus". In 1979, an attempt by Sporting Clube de Portugal to sign him was barred for political reasons as was another attempt by Benfica de Portugal in 1990.

On November 30, 1991, a farewell match was played between Primeiro de Agosto and Petro de Luanda, in honour of Ndunguidi and Jesus Saturnino.

== International career ==
Ndunguidi has made 44 appearances for the Angola national football team throughout his career from 1976 to the late 1980s. |}

After ending his career as a player, he followed a brief coaching career. He coached Primeiro de Agosto to league titles in 1998 and 1999.

In 2013, he had been serving as an adviser to the chairman of Primeiro de Agosto.
