= Joaquim Dinis =

Angolan-Portuguese footballer

Personal information
- Full name: Joaquim António Dinis
- Date of birth: December 1, 1947 (age 78)
- Place of birth: Luanda, Angola
- Position: Forward

Senior career*
Years	Team	Apps	(Gls)
1969	Atlético Luanda		
1969–1975	Sporting	151	(27)
1975–1977	FC Porto	23	(2)
1978–1981	União Leiria		

International career
1970–1971	Portugal U21	4	(0)
1970–1973	Portugal	14	(5)
1978–1980	Angola		(3)

Managerial career
- 1996: Progresso Associação do Sambizanga
- * Club domestic league appearances and goals

Joaquim António Dinis (born 1 December 1947, Luanda) is a former Angolan-Portuguese footballer. He played for Sporting, FC Porto and União Leiria in the Portuguese Liga, as forward. He is a brother of Angolan basketball coach Carlos Dinis.

Dinis gained 14 caps and scored 5 goals for the Portugal national team. He did a great partnership with Eusébio at the Brazil Independence Cup in 1972, scoring all the 5 international goals of his career at the competition. He gave the name to the Joaquim Dinis Stadium in Luanda.

Joaquim Dinis: International goals
No.	Date	Venue	Opponent	Score	Result	Competition
1	11 June 1972	Machadão, Natal, Brazil	Ecuador	0–2	0–3	Brazilian Independence Cup
2	14 June 1972	Estádio do Arruda, Recife, Brazil	Iran	0–2	0–3	Brazilian Independence Cup
3	18 June 1972	Estádio do Arruda, Recife, Brazil	Chile	0–2	1–4	Brazilian Independence Cup
4	18 June 1972	Estádio do Arruda, Recife, Brazil	Chile	1–3	1–4	Brazilian Independence Cup
5	29 June 1972	Estádio do Maracanã, Rio de Janeiro, Brazil	Argentina	1–3	1–3	Brazilian Independence Cup
