= FC Uíge =

Angolan sports club

FC do Uíge
- Full name: Futebol Clube do Uíge
- Founded: 28 May 1951; 74 years ago
- League: Girabola
Home colours

Futebol Clube do Uíge is an Angolan sports club from the province of Uíge.

The club is one of the debutants of Girabola, the Angolan top division league, having participated in the first three editions.

== Manager history and performance ==
Season	Coach	L2	L1	C	Coach	L2	L1	C
1980	(Portugal) Manuel Póvoas							
1981	(Angola) Renato de Sousa				(Bulgaria) Nicolas Bosilov			
