= C.D. Construtores do Uíge =

Angolan sports club

Construtores do Uíge
- Full name: Clube Desportivo Construtores do Uíge
- Founded: 3 March 1978; 47 years ago
- Ground: Estádio 4 de Janeiro; Uíge, Angola
- Capacity: 5,000
- Chairman: José Quarta
- Manager: Pedro Cálix
- League: Gira Angola
- 2014: 3rd (Série A)
Home colours

Clube Desportivo Construtores do Uíge, formerly M.C.H. do Uíge is an Angolan sports club from the northern city of Uíge. The team currently plays in the Gira Angola.

The club, one of the debutants in the first edition of the Girabola after independence, in 1979, is named after its then sponsor, Angola's Ministry of Construction and Housing (in Portuguese: Ministério da Construção e Habitação). After being relegated in 1984, the club remained many years inactive due to financial shortages. In the late 2000s it was revived.

== Achievements ==
- Angolan League: 0

- Angolan Cup: 0

- Angolan SuperCup: 0

- Gira Angola: 0

- Uíge provincial championship: 1

2014

== Manager history ==
Season	Coach	S	L	C	Coach	S	L	C
1981	(Angola) Cardim Pinto	–			(Angola) Renato de Sousa			
1982	(Angola) Vicy António	–			(Angola) Chico Ventura			
1983	(Angola) Armando Costa Man Docas							
1984	(Angola) José Inveja							
2004	(Portugal) Pedro Cálix							

== See also ==
- Girabola
- Gira Angola
