= Clube Ferroviário da Huíla =

Angolan sports club

Ferroviário da Huíla
- Full name: Clube Ferroviário da Huíla
- Founded: 15 October 1950; 75 years ago
- Ground: Estádio do Ferroviário
- Capacity: 15,000
- Chairman: Octávio Henrique de Brito
- Manager: ?
- League: Gira Angola
- 2005: 4th
Home colours	Away colours

Clube Ferroviário da Huíla, formerly Clube Ferroviário de Sá da Bandeira, is an Angolan sports club based in the city of Lubango, Huíla Province.

The club has won the Angolan Football Cup in 1985 and 1989.

== Achievements ==
- Angola Cup: 1985, 1989

In 1988, Ferroviário da Huíla became the first Angolan team to ever reach the quarter-finals of a CAF competition.

== Manager history and performance ==
Season	Coach	L2	L1	C	Coach	L2	L1	C	Coach	L2	L1	C
1980	(Angola) José Damião											
1981	(Angola) Carlos Guedes				(Angola) Cardim Pinto							
1983	(Angola) Zé do Pau											
1984	(Angola) Zé do Pau											
1985	Damião Pinto				(Angola) David de Sousa			1985 Angola Cup				
1986	(Angola) David de Sousa				(Mozambique) Rui Rodrigues							
1987	(Mozambique) Rui Rodrigues											
1988	(Mozambique) Rui Rodrigues				(Portugal) Nina Serrano				(Angola) João Miguel			
1989	(Angola) João Miguel				(Argentina) Rúben Garcia			1989 Angola Cup				
1990	(Argentina) Rúben Garcia											
1991	(Angola) Raimundo				(Angola) João Miguel							
1992	?				(Angola) Damião Pinto							

== See also ==
- Gira Angola
