= 1993 Girabola =

Girabola 1993
- Season: 1993 (–)
- Champions: Petro Luanda
- Relegated: Académica; FC Cabinda; Nocal
- 1994 African Cup of Champions Clubs: Petro Luanda (Girabola winner)
- 1994 CAF Cup: 1º de Maio (Girabola runner-up)
- Matches played: 180
- Top goalscorer: Serginho (14 goals)

The 1993 Girabola was the 15th season of top-tier football competition in Angola. C.D. Primeiro de Agosto were the defending champions.

The league comprised 12 teams, the bottom two of which were relegated.

Petro de Luanda were crowned champions, winning their 8th title, while Académica do Lobito, Desportivo da Nocal and FC de Cabinda were relegated.

Serginho of Desportivo da EKA finished as the top scorer with 14 goals.

== Changes from the 1992 season ==
Relegated: Inter de Luanda, Benfica de Cabinda
Withdrew: Benfica do Huambo, Ferroviário da Huíla, Petro do Huambo, Sporting de Benguela
Promoted: Académica do Lobito, Progresso do Sambizanga

Locations of the 1993 Girabola teams

== League table ==
Pos	Team	Pld	W	D	L	GF	GA	GD	Pts	Qualification or relegation
1	Petro de Luanda (C)	22	14	6	2	27	7	+20	34	Qualification for Champions Cup
2	Primeiro de Maio	21	11	7	3	27	10	+17	29	Qualification for CAF Cup
3	Desportivo da EKA	20	7	9	4	23	22	+1	23	
4	Primeiro de Agosto	22	6	10	6	26	18	+8	22	
5	ASA	22	7	8	7	20	22	−2	22	
6	Inter da Huíla	20	7	6	7	17	16	+1	20	
7	Progresso do Sambizanga	22	5	9	8	18	24	−6	19	
8	Nacional de Benguela	20	6	6	8	22	24	−2	18	
9	Sagrada Esperança	20	4	9	7	16	19	−3	17	
10	Desportivo da Nocal (R)	22	4	9	9	14	19	−5	17	Relegation to Provincial stages
11	Académica do Lobito (R)	21	5	7	9	16	30	−14	17	Relegation to Provincial stages
12	FC de Cabinda (R)	20	4	6	10	20	35	−15	14	Relegation to Provincial stages

Updated to match(es) played on 22 November 1993. Source: Girabola.com
Rules for classification: 1) Points; 2) Head-to-head points; 3) Head-to-head goal difference; 4) Goal difference; 5) Goals scored; 6) Fair-play points; 7) Play-off.
(C) Champions; (R) Relegated

== Results ==
Home \ Away	ACA	ASA	DEK	DNO	FCC	IHL	NAC	PET	PRI	PRM	PRO	SAG
Académica do Lobito	—	1–1	0–1	1–0	2–0	2–1	1–3	0–0	1–1	0–4	3–0	0–0
ASA	1–1	—	0–0	1–0	3–1	0–1	0–0	2–1	0–1	1–2	0–1	1–0
Desportivo da EKA		3–0	—	0–1	4–1	0–0		0–2	1–0	0–0	2–0	3–2
Desportivo da Nocal	2–0	1–1	1–1	—	2–0	1–1	0–0	0–0	1–1	0–1	0–1	1–0
FC de Cabinda	2–0	1–1	1–2	1–0	—			0–0	1–1	1–1	2–1	4–2
Inter da Huíla	4–1	0–1	1–1	1–0	3–0	—	1–1	1–0	1–0	0–1	1–0	0–0
Nacional de Benguela	0–1	2–1	4–0	3–1	2–2	1–0	—	0–1	1–1	0–1	1–2	1–0
Petro de Luanda	1–0	1–1	4–0	1–0	3–0	3–1	1–0	—	1–0	1–0	2–0	2–2
Primeiro de Agosto	6–1	4–2	1–1	0–0	2–1	0–0	3–0	0–1	—	0–0	2–2	2–0
Primeiro de Maio	3–1	0–1	2–2	1–1	3–0	2–0	4–1	0–0	1–0	—	1–0	
Progresso do Sambizanga	0–0	0–1	2–2	2–2	2–1	2–0	1–1	0–1	1–1	0–0	—	1–1
Sagrada Esperança	0–0	1–1	0–0	2–0	1–1		3–1	0–1	1–0	1–0	0–0	—

Updated to match(es) played on 22 November 1994. Source: girabola.com
Legend: Blue = home team win; Yellow = draw; Red = away team win.

== Season statistics ==
=== Scorers ===
R/T
R/T	ACA	ASA	DEK	DNO	FCC	IHL	NAC	PET	PRI	PRM	PRO	SAG	TOTAL
1		4/7/93	4/4/93	4/4/93	4/4/93	4/4/93		4/4/93	4/7/93	4/4/93	4/4/93	4/4/93	15
1	ACA–NAC 1–3	ASA–PRI 0–1	DEK–SAG 3–2; Serginho x3	PRO–DNO 2–2; Lito Tuia 45+1' 55'	FCC–PET 0–0	IHL–PRM 0–1	ACA–NAC 1–3; Liamusek ' Minhonha '	FCC–PET 0–0	ASA–PRI 0–1; Valentim 57'	IHL–PRM 0–1; Brandão '	PRO–DNO 2–2; Kepe 36'; Mingo 90+6'	DEK–SAG 3–2; Man Passa ' Zé Carico '	15
2	10/4/93	11/4/93	10/4/93	10/4/93	11/4/93	11/4/93	10/4/93	11/4/93	10/4/93	11/4/93	10/4/93	11/4/93	15
2	DNO–ACA 2–0	PRM–ASA 0–1; Manuel Martins '	PRO–DEK 2–2; Yaba 25'; Nelson 72'	DNO–ACA 2–0; Tinino '	SAG–FCC 1–1; Claúdio 34'	PET–IHL 3–1; Carlitos 29'	NAC–PRI 1–1; Silva '	PET–IHL 3–1; Amaral 40' 53' 60'	NAC–PRI 1–1; Zacarias '	PRM–ASA 0–1	PRO–DEK 2–2; Afonso ' Zico 89' pen.	SAG–FCC 1–1; Luisão 32'	15
3	24/4/93	25/4/93	24/4/93	24/4/93	25/4/93	25/4/93	25/4/93	25/4/93	24/4/93	25/4/93	25/4/93	25/4/93	19
3	PRI–ACA 6–1	ASA–PET 2–1; Ab.Amaral ? 89' pen.	DEK–DNO 0–1; Tinino '	DEK–DNO 0–1	FCC–PRO 2–1; Cláudio ' Fanfan '	IHL–SAG 0–0	PRM–NAC 4–1; Silva '	ASA–PET 2–1; Nelo Bumba '	PRI–ACA 6–1; Bolefo x2 Muanza x2 Zacarias x2	PRM–NAC 4–1; Nelson x2 Paulão x2	FCC–PRO 2–1; Mendinho '	IHL–SAG 0–0	19
4	8/5/93	9/5/93	16/6/93	8/5/93	16/6/93	9/5/93	9/5/93	9/5/93	8/5/93	8/5/93	9/5/93	9/5/93	15
4	PRM–ACA 3–1; Moniz 39'	ASA–SAG 1–0; Mariano 16'	DEK–FCC 4–1; Carlitos ' Serginho ' Zequinhas x2	DNO–PRI 1–1; Bebé 26'	DEK–FCC 4–1; Jesus '	PRO–IHL 2–0	NAC–PET 0–1	NAC–PET 0–1; Clarindo 27'	DNO–PRI 1–1; Valentim 90+3'	PRM–ACA 3–1; Paulão 7'; Brandão 42' 85'	PRO–IHL 2–0; Kepe 9'; Nelo 44' o.g.	ASA–SAG 1–0	15
5	30/6/93	16/5/93	16/5/93	16/5/93	16/5/93	16/5/93	15/5/93	30/6/93	16/5/93	16/5/93	16/5/93	15/5/93	8
5	ACA–PET 0–0	PRO–ASA 0–1; Paulo Tomás 47'	IHL–DEK 1–1; Zequinhas 27'	FCC–DNO 1–0	FCC–DNO 1–0; Fanfan '	IHL–DEK 1–1; Silva 33' pen.	SAG–NAC 3–1; Nelsinho '	ACA–PET 0–0	PRI–PRM 0–0	PRI–PRM 0–0	PRO–ASA 0–1	SAG–NAC 3–1; Agostinho ' Cangato ' Luisão '	8
6	22/5/93	7/7/93	7/7/93	19/5/93			23/5/93	21/5/93	21/5/93	19/5/93	23/5/93	22/5/93	
6	SAG–ACA 0–0	ASA–DEK 0–0	ASA–DEK 0–0	DNO–PRM 0–1	FCC–IHL –	FCC–IHL –	NAC–PRO 1–2; Abegá '	PET–PRI 1–0; Clarindo 70'	PET–PRI 1–0	DNO–PRM 0–1; Paulão 33'	NAC–PRO 1–2; Kepe ' Zezinho '	SAG–ACA 0–0	
7	29/5/93	26/5/93	29/5/93	26/5/93	26/5/93	26/5/93	29/5/93	4/7/93	26/5/93	4/7/93	29/5/93	26/5/93	
7	ACA–PRO 3–0	ASA–FCC 3–1; Lolo 34'; Libengué 40'; Paulo Tomás 67'	DEK–NAC –	DNO–IHL 1–1; Tinino '	ASA–FCC 3–1; Cláudio 87'	DNO–IHL 1–1; Zé Pereira 14'	DEK–NAC –	PRM–PET 0–0	PRI–SAG 2–0; Moisés ' Muanza '	PRM–PET 0–0	ACA–PRO 3–0	PRI–SAG 2–0	
8	6/6/93	30/5/93	6/6/93	8/6/93	6/6/93	30/5/93	6/6/93	8/6/93	30/6/93	6/6/93	30/6/93	6/6/93	
8	DEK–ACA –	IHL–ASA 0–1; Mariano '	DEK–ACA –	PET–DNO 1–0	FCC–NAC –	IHL–ASA 0–1	FCC–NAC –	PET–DNO 1–0; Amaral 15'	PRI–PRO 2–2; Roberto 7'; Moisés 55'	PRM–SAG –	PRI–PRO 2–2; Zico 6' pen. Cungulo 68'	PRM–SAG –	
9	13/6/93	12/6/93	9/6/93	12/6/93	13/6/93	13/6/93	13/6/93	12/6/93	9/6/93	13/6/93	13/6/93	12/6/93	8
9	ACA–FCC 2–0	DNO–ASA 1–1; Mariano 3'	PRI–DEK 1–1; Serginho 18'	DNO–ASA 1–1; Bebé 41'	ACA–FCC 2–0	NAC–IHL 1–0	NAC–IHL 1–0	SAG–PET 0–1; Amaral '	PRI–DEK 1–1; Russo 11'	PRO–PRM 0–0	PRO–PRM 0–0	SAG–PET 0–1	8
10	27/6/93	26/6/93	26/6/93	26/6/93		27/6/93	26/6/93	27/6/93		26/6/93	27/6/93	26/6/93	11
10	IHL–ACA 4–1	ASA–NAC 0–0	DEK–PRM 0–0	SAG–DNO 2–0	FCC–PRI 1–1	IHL–ACA 4–1	ASA–NAC 0–0	PET–PRO 2–0	FCC–PRI 1–1	DEK–PRM 0–0	PET–PRO 2–0	SAG–DNO 2–0	11
11	11/7/93	11/7/93	10/7/93	11/7/93	11/7/93	11/7/93	11/7/93	10/7/93	11/7/93	11/7/93	10/7/93	10/7/93	11
11	ACA–ASA 1–1	ACA–ASA 1–1	PET–DEK 4–0	DNO–NAC 0–0	PRM–FCC 3–0	PRI–IHL 0–0	DNO–NAC 0–0	PET–DEK 4–0	PRI–IHL 0–0	PRM–FCC 3–0	PRO–SAG 1–1	PRO–SAG 1–1	11
12	24/7/93	25/7/93	24/7/93	25/7/93	24/7/93	25/7/93	24/7/93	24/7/93	25/7/93	25/7/93	25/7/93	24/7/93	13
12	NAC–ACA 0–1; Zé Maria '	PRI–ASA 4–2; Arlindo 3'; Mariano 75' pen.	SAG–DEK 0–0	DNO–PRO 0–1	PET–FCC 3–0	PRM–IHL 2–0	NAC–ACA 0–1	PET–FCC 3–0; Amaral x2 Clarindo '	PRI–ASA 4–2; Velho 45'; Valentim 61' 80'; Mbila 64'	PRM–IHL 2–0	DNO–PRO 0–1; Zezinho 60'	SAG–DEK 0–0	13
13	2/8/93	1/8/93	31/7/93	2/8/93	1/8/93	1/8/93	31/7/93	1/8/93	31/7/93	1/8/93	31/7/93	1/8/93	16
13	ACA–DNO 1–0	ASA–PRM 1–2; Manuel Martins 90'	DEK–PRO 2–0; Serginho x2	ACA–DNO 1–0	FCC–SAG 4–2	IHL–PET 1–0	PRI–NAC 3–0	IHL–PET 1–0	PRI–NAC 3–0; Bolefo 15'; Ndisso 22'; Zacarias 86'	ASA–PRM 1–2; Minguito 20' 82'	DEK–PRO 2–0	FCC–SAG 4–2	16
14	8/8/93	8/8/93	7/8/93	7/8/93	7/8/93	13/9/93	8/8/93	8/8/93	8/8/93	8/8/93	7/8/93	13/9/93	
14	ACA–PRI 1–1	PET–ASA 1–1; Clarindo ' o.g.	DNO–DEK 1–1; Inácio 3'	DNO–DEK 1–1; Bebé 70' pen.	PRO–FCC 2–1; Jesus 76'	SAG–IHL –	NAC–PRM 0–1	PET–ASA 1–1; Amaral 41'	ACA–PRI 1–1	NAC–PRM 0–1	PRO–FCC 2–1; Zico 18' pen. Zezinho '	SAG–IHL –	
15	15/8/93	14/8/93	14/8/93	15/8/93	14/8/93	15/8/93	14/8/93	14/8/93	15/8/93	15/8/93	15/8/93	14/8/93	11
15	ACA–PRM 0–4	SAG–ASA 1–1	FCC–DEK 1–2; Serginho x2	PRI–DNO 0–0	FCC–DEK 1–2	IHL–PRO 1–0	PET–NAC 1–0	PET–NAC 1–0; Amaral 63'	PRI–DNO 0–0	ACA–PRM 0–4	IHL–PRO 1–0	SAG–ASA 1–1	11
16	21/8/93	22/8/93	21/8/93	22/8/93	22/8/93	21/8/93	21/8/93	21/8/93	22/8/93	22/8/93	22/8/93	21/8/93	6
16	PET–ACA 1–0	ASA–PRO 0–1	DEK–IHL 0–0	DNO–FCC 2–0	DNO–FCC 2–0	DEK–IHL 0–0	NAC–SAG 1–0; Chico 77'	PET–ACA 1–0	PRM–PRI 1–0	PRM–PRI 1–0; Jorgito 65'	ASA–PRO 0–1; Costa 70'	NAC–SAG 1–0	6
17	25/8/93	28/8/93	28/8/93	29/8/93	25/8/93	25/8/93	28/8/93	29/8/93	29/8/93	29/8/93	28/8/93	25/8/93	11
17	ACA–SAG 0–0	DEK–ASA 3–0; Distance x2 Zequinhas '	DEK–ASA 3–0	PRM–DNO 1–1; Guilherme 82'	IHL–FCC 3–0	IHL–FCC 3–0; Cláudio ' Osvaldo ' Silva '	PRO–NAC 1–1; Nino Faria 78'	PRI–PET 0–1; Felito 40' pen.	PRI–PET 0–1	PRM–DNO 1–1; Nelson 53'	PRO–NAC 1–1; Costa 32'	ACA–SAG 0–0	11
18	4/9/93	18/8/93	5/9/93	5/9/93	18/8/93	5/9/93	5/9/93	1/9/93	4/9/93	1/9/93	4/9/93	4/9/93	9
18	PRO–ACA 0–0	FCC–ASA 1–1	NAC–DEK 4–0	IHL–DNO 1–0	FCC–ASA 1–1	IHL–DNO 1–0	NAC–DEK 4–0	PET–PRM 1–0	SAG–PRI 1–0	PET–PRM 1–0	PRO–ACA 0–0	SAG–PRI 1–0	9
19	8/9/93	11/9/93	8/9/93	12/9/93	12/9/93	11/9/93	12/9/93	12/9/93	12/9/93	11/9/93	12/9/93	11/9/93	9
19	ACA–DEK 0–1	ASA–IHL 0–1	ACA–DEK 0–1	DNO–PET 0–0	NAC–FCC 2–2	ASA–IHL 0–1	NAC–FCC 2–2	DNO–PET 0–0	PRO–PRI 1–1; Muanza 67'	SAG–PRM 1–0	PRO–PRI 1–1; Lando 58'	SAG–PRM 1–0; Man Passa 73' pen.	9
20	19/9/93	25/8/93	18/9/93	25/8/93	19/9/93	19/9/93	19/9/93	19/9/93	18/9/93	19/9/93	19/9/93	19/9/93	11
20	FCC–ACA 2–0	ASA–DNO 1–0; Nelo 72'	DEK–PRI 1–0	ASA–DNO 1–0	FCC–ACA 2–0; Zanga 5'; Mavinga 8' pen.	IHL–NAC 1–1	IHL–NAC 1–1	PET–SAG 2–2; Rosário ' Bodunha 63'	DEK–PRI 1–0	PRM–PRO 1–0	PRM–PRO 1–0	PET–SAG 2–2; Agostinho 12'; Cangato 88'	11
21	26/9/93	26/9/93	26/9/93	26/9/93	27/9/93	26/9/93	26/9/93	26/9/93	27/9/93	26/9/93	26/9/93	26/9/93	15
21	ACA–IHL 2–1	NAC–ASA 2–1	PRM–DEK 2–2; Serginho '	DNO–SAG 1–0	PRI–FCC 2–1; Mavinga pen.	ACA–IHL 2–1	NAC–ASA 2–1	PRO–PET 0–1; Felito 75'	PRI–FCC 2–1; Moisés 15'; Muanza '	PRM–DEK 2–2	PRO–PET 0–1	DNO–SAG 1–0	15
22	3/10/93	3/10/93	3/10/93	3/10/93	3/10/93	3/10/93	3/10/93	3/10/93	3/10/93	3/10/93	3/10/93	3/10/93	11
22	ASA–ACA 1–1	ASA–ACA 1–1	DEK–PET 0–2	NAC–DNO 3–1	FCC–PRM 1–1	IHL–PRI 1–0	NAC–DNO 3–1	DEK–PET 0–2	IHL–PRI 1–0	FCC–PRM 1–1	SAG–PRO 0–0	SAG–PRO 0–0	11
T		20		14				27	26		18		

=== Top scorer ===
- (Angola) Francisco Leite Jorge Serginho

== Champions ==
1993 Girabola winner
Atlético Petróleos de Luanda
8th title

Squad: Amaral, Aurélio, Avelino, Bodunha, Chicangala, Chico Dinis, Clarindo, Felito, Hélder, Jaburú, Nelo Bumba, Oliveira, Paulito, Paulo, Paulo Silva, Rosário, Saúl, Valente, Willy, Zacarias, Zico
Head coach: Gojko Zec
