= 1994 Girabola =

Girabola 1994
- Season: 1994 (–)
- Champions: Petro Luanda
- Relegated: Inter Huíla; Sagrada
- 1995 African Cup of Champions Clubs: Petro Luanda (Girabola winner)
- 1995 CAF Cup: 1º de Maio (Girabola runner-up)
- Matches played: 180
- Top goalscorer: Kabongo (16 goals)

The 1994 Girabola was the 16th season of top-tier football competition in Angola. Atlético Petróleos de Luanda were the defending champions.

The league comprised 12 teams, the bottom two of which were relegated.

Petro de Luanda were crowned champions, winning their 9th title, and second in a row, while Inter da Huíla and Sagrada Esperança were relegated.

Kabongo of Sonangol do Namibe finished as the top scorer with 16 goals.

== Changes from the 1993 season ==
Relegated: Académica do Lobito, Desportivo da Nocal, FC de Cabinda
Promoted: Independente do Tômbwa, Sonangol do Namibe, Sporting de Luanda

Locations of the 1994 Girabola teams

== League table ==
Pos	Team	Pld	W	D	L	GF	GA	GD	Pts	Qualification or relegation
1	Petro de Luanda (C)	22	13	8	1	37	14	+23	34	Qualification for Champions Cup
2	Primeiro de Maio	21	13	4	4	36	20	+16	30	Qualification for CAF Cup
3	Independente do Tômbwa	20	10	3	7	22	18	+4	23	
4	Progresso do Sambizanga	20	7	8	5	22	15	+7	22	
5	Primeiro de Agosto	22	9	6	7	25	16	+9	24	
6	ASA	22	9	4	9	25	21	+4	22	
7	Sporting de Luanda	22	5	8	9	17	20	−3	18	
8	Nacional de Benguela	19	7	4	8	18	26	−8	18	
9	Desportivo da EKA	18	4	8	6	12	20	−8	16	
10	Sonangol do Namibe (Note: Name later changed to Atlético do Namibe)	17	5	3	9	18	26	−8	13	
11	Sagrada Esperança (R)	20	3	5	12	18	35	−17	11	Relegation to Provincial stages
12	Inter da Huíla (R)	17	1	7	9	5	24	−19	9	Relegation to Provincial stages

Updated to match(es) played on 22 November 1994. Source: Girabola.com
Rules for classification: 1) Points; 2) Head-to-head points; 3) Head-to-head goal difference; 4) Goal difference; 5) Goals scored; 6) Fair-play points; 7) Play-off.
(C) Champions; (R) Relegated

== Results ==
Home \ Away	ASA	DEK	IHL	IND	NAC	PET	PRI	PRM	PRO	SAG	SCL	SON
ASA	—	1–2	3–0	0–2	3–0	0–1	1–1	2–1	1–1	4–1	1–0	2–0
Desportivo da EKA	2–0	—	0–0	1–3	1–1	1–1	1–0	2–2	0–0	0–2	0–0	
Independente do Tômbwa	0–0		—	1–0		1–2	0–3	0–1	0–0	0–0	1–1	1–1
Inter da Huíla	1–0	0–0	3–0	—	2–0	0–1	1–0	2–1			1–0	1–0
Nacional de Benguela	2–1	1–0		2–0	—	0–0	2–0	1–4	0–0	2–0	1–0	
Petro de Luanda	1–1	4–0	2–0	4–1	4–0	—	0–2	4–3	2–1	2–0	2–0	3–1
Primeiro de Agosto	2–0	1–1	3–0	1–1	3–0	0–1	—	0–0	0–1	3–2	0–0	2–1
Primeiro de Maio	2–1	2–0		1–0	2–1	0–0	2–1	—	2–0	5–2	3–1	2–0
Progresso do Sambizanga	0–1	0–1	3–0	3–1	2–1	0–0	1–1	2–0	—	3–0	1–1	3–4
Sagrada Esperança	0–1		1–1	0–2	1–2	2–2	0–1	0–1	0–0	—	2–2	3–0
Sonangol do Namibe	2–0	2–0	1–0	1–1	0–0	0–0	0–1	1–2	0–1	3–0	—	0–2
Sporting de Luanda	0–2			2–0	3–2	1–1	1–0	0–0		1–2	1–2	—

Updated to match(es) played on 22 November 1994. Source: girabola.com
Legend: Blue = home team win; Yellow = draw; Red = away team win.

== Season statistics ==
=== Scorers ===
R/T
R/T	ASA	DEK	IHL	IND	NAC	PET	PRI	PRM	PRO	SAG	SCL	SON	TOTAL
1	3/4/94	3/4/94	3/4/94	3/4/94	3/4/94	3/4/94	3/4/94	3/4/94	3/4/94	3/4/94	3/4/94	3/4/94	17
1	ASA–IND 0–2	DEK–PRO 0–0	IHL–PRI 0–3	ASA–IND 0–2	NAC–PRM 1–4	SAG–PET 2–2	IHL–PRI 0–3	NAC–PRM 1–4	DEK–PRO 0–0	SAG–PET 2–2	SON–SCL 1–2	SON–SCL 1–2	17
2	10/4/94	9/4/94	10/4/94	10/4/94	10/4/94	10/4/94	9/4/94	10/4/94	10/4/94	9/4/94	9/4/94	10/4/94	16
2	PET–ASA 1–1	SCL–DEK 2–0	PRO–IHL 3–0	IND–NAC 2–0	IND–NAC 2–0	PET–ASA 1–1	PRI–SAG 3–2	PRM–SON 2–0	PRO–IHL 3–0	PRI–SAG 3–2	SCL–DEK 2–0	PRM–SON 2–0	16
3	17/4/94	16/4/94	17/4/94	17/4/94	17/4/94	17/4/94	17/4/94	16/4/94	16/4/94	17/4/94	16/4/94	17/4/94	10
3	ASA–PRI 1–1	DEK–PRM 2–2	IHL–SAG 0–0	SON–IND 2–0	NAC–PET 0–0	NAC–PET 0–0	ASA–PRI 1–1	DEK–PRM 2–2	PRO–SCL 1–1	IHL–SAG 0–0	PRO–SCL 1–1	SON–IND 2–0	10
4	23/4/94	24/4/94	24/4/94	24/4/94	24/4/94	23/4/94	24/4/94	24/4/94	24/4/94	23/4/94	24/4/94	23/4/94	11
4	SAG–ASA 0–1	IND–DEK 0–0	SCL–IHL 1–0	IND–DEK 0–0	PRI–NAC 3–0	PET–SON 3–1; Zezinho 14' 24'; Amaral 84'	PRI–NAC 3–0	PRM–PRO 2–0	PRM–PRO 2–0	SAG–ASA 0–1	SCL–IHL 1–0	PET–SON 3–1; Guilherme '	11
5	8/5/94	7/5/94	8/5/94	7/5/94	8/5/94	7/5/94	8/5/94	8/5/94	7/5/94	8/5/94	8/5/94	8/5/94	12
5	IHL–ASA 0–0	DEK–PET 1–1; Serginho '	IHL–ASA 0–0	PRO–IND 3–1; Kaizer 16'	NAC–SAG 2–0	DEK–PET 1–1; Nelo Bumba '	SON–PRI 1–0	SCL–PRM 1–2; Willy 6'; Seul 49'	PRO–IND 3–1; Cacharamba 25'; Carlitos 51' o.g. Kepe 82'	NAC–SAG 2–0	SCL–PRM 1–2; Nando Saturnino 60'	SON–PRI 1–0; Kabongó 3' pen.	12
6	22/5/94	21/5/94	25/5/94	22/5/94	22/5/94	18/5/94	21/5/94	25/5/94	18/5/94	21/5/94	22/5/94	21/5/94	
6	ASA–NAC 3–0; Bolefo ' Miranda ' Quinzinho '	PRI–DEK 1–1; Serginho 28'	PRM–IHL –	IND–SCL 1–0	ASA–NAC 3–0	PET–PRO 2–1; Paulito 17' 40'	PRI–DEK 1–1; Mbila 71'	PRM–IHL –	PET–PRO 2–1; Dudú 65'	SAG–SON 3–0	IND–SCL 1–0	SAG–SON 3–0	
7	29/5/94	29/5/94	29/5/94	29/5/94	29/5/94	28/5/94	29/5/94	29/5/94	29/5/94	29/5/94	28/5/94	29/5/94	
7	SON–ASA 0–2	DEK–SAG 0–2	IHL–NAC –	PRM–IND 1–0	IHL–NAC –	SCL–PET 0–0	PRO–PRI 1–1	PRM–IND 1–0	PRO–PRI 1–1	DEK–SAG 0–2	SCL–PET 0–0	SON–ASA 0–2	
8	4/6/94	4/6/94	5/6/94	5/6/94	5/6/94	5/6/94	1/6/94	5/6/94	5/6/94	5/6/94	1/6/94	5/6/94	
8	ASA–DEK 1–2; Arlindo 22'	ASA–DEK 1–2; Amabará 4'; Serginho 88'	IND–IHL 3–0	IND–IHL 3–0	NAC–SON –	PET–PRM 4–3; Paulito 5'; Zico 10'	PRI–SCL 0–0	PET–PRM 4–3; Minguito ' Nelson ' Seul '	PRO–SAG 0–3; Dudú 23'; Muluzi 25'; Papy 33'	PRO–SAG 0–3	PRI–SCL 0–0	NAC–SON –	
9	10/6/94	11/6/94	11/6/94	11/6/94	11/6/94	11/6/94	11/6/94	11/6/94	10/6/94	11/6/94	11/6/94	11/6/94	12
9	PRO–ASA 0–1; Bebeto '	DEK–NAC 1–1	IHL–SON 1–1; Quim Faria '	IND–PET 0–1	DEK–NAC 1–1	IND–PET 0–1	PRM–PRI 2–1	PRM–PRI 2–1	PRO–ASA 0–1	SCL–SAG 3–0	SCL–SAG 3–0; Quinito 26'; N. Saturnino 30' 37'	IHL–SON 1–1; Mateus 42'	12
10	15/6/94	19/6/94	18/6/94	19/6/94	19/6/94	18/6/94	19/6/94	18/6/94	19/6/94	18/6/94	15/6/94	19/6/94	
10	ASA–SCL 1–0; Quinzinho 90+9'	SON–DEK –	PET–IHL 2–0	PRI–IND 1–1; Jaburú 90+1'	NAC–PRO 0–0	PET–IHL 2–0	PRI–IND 1–1; Zacarias 67'	SAG–PRM 0–1	NAC–PRO 0–0	SAG–PRM 0–1	ASA–SCL 1–0	SON–DEK –	
11	26/6/94	25/6/94	25/6/94	26/6/94	25/6/94	26/6/94	26/6/94	26/6/94	26/6/94	26/6/94	25/6/94	26/6/94	
11	PRM–ASA 2–1	DEK–IHL 0–0	DEK–IHL 0–0	IND–SAG –	SCL–NAC 0–0	PET–PRI 0–2	PET–PRI 0–2; Mateus Fuidimau 52'; Zacarias 84'	PRM–ASA 2–1	PRO–SON 3–4; Serginho 4'; Costa ' Papy '	IND–SAG –	SCL–NAC 0–0	PRO–SON 3–4; Kabongó x3 Yaba '	
12	10/7/94	9/7/94	9/7/94	10/7/94	10/7/94	10/7/94	9/7/94	10/7/94	9/7/94	10/7/94	10/7/94	10/7/94	12
12	IND–ASA 1–0	PRO–DEK 0–1; Coró 16'	PRI–IHL 3–0	IND–ASA 1–0	PRM–NAC 2–1	PET–SAG 2–0; Zezinho 1'; Paulito ' pen.	PRI–IHL 3–0; Mateus Fuidimau ' Neto 21'; Zacarias '	PRM–NAC 2–1	PRO–DEK 0–1	PET–SAG 2–0	SCL–SON 0–2	SCL–SON 0–2; Sousa 15'; Kabongó 26'	12
13	17/7/94	16/7/94	17/7/94	17/7/94	17/7/94	17/7/94	16/7/94	17/7/94	17/7/94	16/7/94	16/7/94	17/7/94	4
13	ASA–PET 0–1	DEK–SCL 0–0	IHL–PRO 0–0	NAC–IND 2–0	NAC–IND 2–0	ASA–PET 0–1; Aurélio '	SAG–PRI 0–1; Mateus Fuidimau 52'	SON–PRM 0–0	IHL–PRO 0–0	SAG–PRI 0–1	DEK–SCL 0–0	SON–PRM 0–0	4
14	24/7/94	24/7/94	23/7/94	24/7/94	23/7/94	23/7/94	24/7/94	24/7/94	23/7/94	23/7/94	23/7/94	24/7/94	12
14	PRI–ASA 2–0	PRM–DEK 2–0	SAG–IHL 1–1; Quim Faria 67'	IND–SON 1–0	PET–NAC 4–0	PET–NAC 4–0; Paulito 22'; Nelo Bumba 45'; Oliveira 62'; Amaral 73'	PRI–ASA 2–0; Assis 34' pen. Mbila 42'	PRM–DEK 2–0	SCL–PRO 0–1; Serginho 7'	SAG–IHL 1–1; Cláudio 35'	SCL–PRO 0–1	IND–SON 1–0	12
15	30/7/94	30/7/94	30/7/94	30/7/94	30/7/94	30/7/94	30/7/94	31/7/94	31/7/94	30/7/94	30/7/94	30/7/94	17
15	ASA–SAG 4–1; Quinzinho 16' 20' 64'; Abílio Amaral 26'	DEK–IND 1–3	IHL–SCL 1–1	DEK–IND 1–3	NAC–PRI 2–0; Akwá 90'	SON–PET 1–1; Amaral 69'	NAC–PRI 2–0	PRO–PRM 2–0; Lito Tuia 28'; Serginho 55'	PRO–PRM 2–0	ASA–SAG 4–1; Man Passa 25'	IHL–SCL 1–1	SON–PET 1–1; Kabongó 84'	17
16	21/8/94	20/8/94	21/8/94	20/8/94	20/8/94	20/8/94	20/8/94	20/8/94	20/8/94	20/8/94	20/8/94	20/8/94	
16	ASA–IHL 3–0; Quinzinho 26' 80'; Bolefo 28'	PET–DEK 4–0	ASA–IHL 3–0	IND–PRO –	SAG–NAC 1–2; Minhonha 58'; Akwá 86'	PET–DEK 4–0; Amaral 24'; Libengué 74'; Aurélio 88'; Paulito '	PRI–SON 2–1; Assis 8'; M.Fuidimau 15' pen.	PRM–SCL 3–1	IND–PRO –	SAG–NAC 1–2; Man Passa 61'	PRM–SCL 3–1	PRI–SON 2–1; Cláudio 53'	
17	28/8/94	27/8/94	27/8/94	27/8/94	28/8/94	28/8/94	27/8/94	27/8/94	28/8/94	28/8/94	27/8/94	28/8/94	10
17	NAC–ASA 2–1	DEK–PRI 1–0	IHL–PRM 0–1	SCL–IND 1–1; Jonas '	NAC–ASA 2–1	PRO–PET 0–0	DEK–PRI 1–0	IHL–PRM 0–1; Castella '	PRO–PET 0–0	SON–SAG 1–2	SCL–IND 1–1; Q.Santos 90' pen.	SON–SAG 1–2	10
18	6/9/94	22/9/94	5/10/94	24/9/94	5/10/94	7/9/94	8/9/94	24/9/94	8/9/94	22/9/94	7/9/94	6/9/94	
18	ASA–SON 2–0; Bolefo 80'; Quinzinho 82'	SAG–DEK –	NAC–IHL –	IND–PRM 2–1	NAC–IHL –	PET–SCL 2–0; Rosário 31'; Paulito 70'	PRI–PRO 0–1	IND–PRM 2–1	PRI–PRO 0–1	SAG–DEK –	PET–SCL 2–0	ASA–SON 2–0	
19	10/9/94	10/9/94	11/9/94	11/9/94	25/9/94	5/10/94	11/9/94	5/10/94	25/9/94	25/9/94	11/9/94	25/9/94	9
19	DEK–ASA 2–0	DEK–ASA 2–0; Serginho 28' 50'	IHL–IND 1–0	IHL–IND 1–0	SON–NAC 3–2	PRM–PET 0–0	SCL–PRI 0–1; Assis ' pen.	PRM–PET 0–0	SAG–PRO 0–0	SAG–PRO 0–0	SCL–PRI 0–1	SON–NAC 3–2	9
20	18/9/94	18/9/94	18/9/94	17/9/94	18/9/94	17/9/94	28/9/94	28/9/94	18/9/94	19/10/94	19/10/94	18/9/94	
20	ASA–PRO 1–1; Patrick 87'	NAC–DEK 1–0	SON–IHL –	PET–IND 4–1; Milonga 39'	NAC–DEK 1–0	PET–IND 4–1; Paulito x2 Paulo Silva 61'; Zico '	PRI–PRM 0–0	PRI–PRM 0–0	ASA–PRO 1–1	SAG–SCL 2–2; Cláudio ' Tito '	SAG–SCL 2–2; Merodaque ' Rabolé '	SON–IHL –	
21	30/10/94	30/10/94	30/10/94	30/10/94	30/10/94	30/10/94	30/10/94	30/10/94	30/10/94	30/10/94	30/10/94	30/10/94	
21	SCL–ASA 2–0	DEK–SON –	IHL–PET 1–2; Guedes '	IND–PRI 1–0	PRO–NAC 2–1; Lilo 53' pen.	IHL–PET 1–2; Amaral 38'; Nelo Bumba 84'	IND–PRI 1–0	PRM–SAG 5–2; Brandão 5' 60'; Miguel 50'; Nana 80'; Nelson 87'	PRO–NAC 2–1; Serginho 30'; Abel 74'	PRM–SAG 5–2; Cristo 64'; Lito 75'	SCL–ASA 2–0; Merodaque 48'; Bruga 82'	DEK–SON –	
22	27/11/94	27/11/94	27/11/94	27/11/94	27/11/94	27/11/94	27/11/94	27/11/94	27/11/94	27/11/94	27/11/94	27/11/94	
22	ASA–PRM 2–1; Quinzinho 15'; Bolefo 26'	IHL–DEK –	IHL–DEK –	SAG–IND 0–2; Tostão 55'; Jaburú 81'	NAC–SCL 1–0	PRI–PET 0–1; Paulito 16'	PRI–PET 0–1	ASA–PRM 2–1; Jorge 46'	SON–PRO –	SAG–IND 0–2	NAC–SCL 1–0	SON–PRO –	
T	25					37	25				17		

=== Top scorer ===
- (Zaire) Kabongo

== Champions ==
1994 Girabola winner
Atlético Petróleos de Luanda
9th title

Squad: Amaral, Bodunha, Chico Dinis, Clarindo, Felito, Hélder, Libengué, Marito, Nelo Bumba, Oliveira, Paulito, Paulo, Rosário, Zacarias, Zico
Head coach: Gojko Zec
