= 1982 Girabola =

Girabola 1982
- Season: 1982 (12/6/1982–6/2/1983)
- Champions: Petro Luanda
- Relegated: Inter Huíla; M.C.H. Uíge; Sagrada
- 1983 African Cup of Champions Clubs: Petro de Luanda (Girabola winner)
- Matches played: 182
- Biggest home win: 1º Agosto 7–2 Sagrada (09 Jan 1983)
- Biggest away win: 1º Agosto 2–6 Petro (04 Dec 1982)
- Highest scoring: Petro 7–6 1º Maio (22 Jan 1983)

The 1982 Girabola was the fourth season of top-tier football competition in Angola. Primeiro de Agosto were the defending champions.

The league ran from December 6, 1982, to June 2, 1983, and comprised 14 teams, the bottom three of which were relegated.

Petro de Luanda were crowned champions, winning their 1st title, while Desportivo da Chela, FC do Uíge, Ferroviário da Huíla and Petro do Huambo were relegated.

Osvaldo Saturnino aka Jesus of Petro de Luanda finished as the top scorer with 22 goals.

== Changes from the 1981 season ==
Relegated: Desportivo da Chela, FC do Uíge, Ferroviário da Huíla, Petro do Huambo
Promoted: Desportivo de Benguela, Inter da Huíla, Inter de Luanda, Sagrada Esperança

== Legal claims ==
In round 14, Construtor do Uíge fielded ineligible player "Finda" (double yellow card) in its away match against Inter de Luanda. Although Construtor had originally won the match 1–0, on account of that, Construtor was awarded a 2–0 defeat.

Locations of the 1982 Girabola teams

== League table ==
Pos	Team	Pld	W	D	L	GF	GA	GD	Pts	Qualification or relegation
1	Petro de Luanda (C)	26	14	9	3	52	27	+25	37	Qualification for Champions Cup
2	Primeiro de Agosto	24	10	8	6	46	31	+15	28	
3	Primeiro de Maio	25	10	9	6	44	37	+7	29	
4	Inter de Luanda (Note: Name later changed to Interclube)	23	10	6	7	32	24	+8	26	
5	Mambroa (Note: Name later reverted to its original Benfica do Huambo)	23	10	7	6	30	23	+7	27	
6	Progresso do Sambizanga	22	6	12	4	32	26	+6	24	
7	Desportivo da TAAG (Note: Name later reverted to its original ASA)	22	8	8	6	32	30	+2	24	
8	Nacional de Benguela	22	7	8	7	26	24	+2	22	
9	Desportivo de Benguela (Note: Name later reverted to its original Sporting de Benguela)	23	8	8	7	29	26	+3	24	
10	Desportivo da Chela (Note: Name later reverted to its original Benfica do Lubango)	24	6	9	9	25	34	−9	21	
11	Académica do Lobito	24	8	4	12	26	35	−9	20	
12	Inter da Huíla (R)	21	5	6	10	19	30	−11	16	Relegation to Provincial stages
13	Construtores do Uíge (R)	22	5	3	14	21	39	−18	13	Relegation to Provincial stages
14	Sagrada Esperança (R)	23	3	7	13	26	54	−28	13	Relegation to Provincial stages

Updated to match(es) played on 22 November 1982. Source: Girabola.com
Rules for classification: 1) Points; 2) Head-to-head points; 3) Head-to-head goal difference; 4) Goal difference; 5) Goals scored; 6) Fair-play points; 7) Play-off.
(C) Champions; (R) Relegated

== Results ==
Home \ Away	ACA	COU	DBG	DCH	DTA	IHL	INT	MAM	NAC	PET	PRI	PRM	PRO	SAG
Académica do Lobito	—	1–1	2–1	1–2	0–0	2–1	0–3		1–3	0–1		0–2	2–3	1–0
Construtores do Uíge	0–3	—		2–1	2–0	2–2	0–0	1–4	1–2	0–1	0–1	2–3		4–0
Desportivo de Benguela	0–1	2–0	—	1–1	2–2	1–0	3–1	0–1	0–0	1–0	0–0	3–3	1–1	3–1
Desportivo da Chela	2–1		0–1	—	2–1	1–2	1–0	0–0	0–0	2–2	2–1	1–0	2–2	2–3
Desportivo da TAAG	1–1	1–2	3–2	3–3	—		1–0	2–0	2–1	1–1	2–1		1–1	0–1
Inter da Huíla	1–0	2–0		1–0	0–2	—	0–3	2–0		0–1		1–1		2–2
Inter de Luanda	1–0	2–0	1–1		1–2	2–0	—	0–1	2–1	2–1	0–2	2–2	–	3–1
Mambroa	3–1	1–0	0–0	1–1		0–0	1–3	—	3–0	1–2	1–0	3–1	0–0	5–2
Nacional de Benguela	2–0	3–1		2–0		3–1	1–1	0–0	—	1–1	0–0	2–3	0–0	1–1
Petro de Luanda	2–0	5–1	3–1	3–0	3–0	1–0	1–2	2–1	0–0	—	1–1	7–6	2–2	3–0
Primeiro de Agosto	4–2	3–1	2–0	3–0	1–1	5–1	2–2	0–1	1–2	2–6	—	1–1	1–1	7–2
Primeiro de Maio	2–3	0–1	2–1	1–1	1–1	2–1	2–0	3–0	2–1	1–1	1–1	—	2–1	2–3
Progresso do Sambizanga	1–2	2–0	1–1	1–1	5–2	0–0	1–1	3–0	2–0	1–1	2–4	0–1	—	2–1
Sagrada Esperança	1–1	–	0–2	1–2	0–4	1–1		2–2		1–1	2–3	0–0	1–3	—

Updated to match(es) played on 6 February 1983. Source: girabola.com
Legend: Blue = home team win; Yellow = draw; Red = away team win.

== Season statistics ==
=== Scorers ===
R/T
R/T	ACA	COU	DBG	DCH	DTA	IHL	INT	MAM	NAC	PET	PRI	PRM	PRO	SAG	TOTAL
1	13/6/82	13/6/82	12/6/82	13/6/82	13/6/82	12/6/82	13/6/82	13/6/82	13/6/82	12/6/82	13/6/82	13/6/82	13/6/82	12/6/82	
1	DCH–ACA 2–1	COU–INT 0–0	DBG–IHL 1–0; Didí 21'	DCH–ACA 2–1	DTA–NAC 2–1	DBG–IHL 1–0	COU–INT 0–0	MAM–PRO 0–0	DTA–NAC 2–1	PET–SAG 3–0; Haia 29' 49'; Lito 89'	PRM–PRI 1–1	PRM–PRI 1–1	MAM–PRO 0–0	PET–SAG 3–0	12
2	20/6/82	19/6/82	20/6/82	20/6/82	20/6/82	20/6/82	19/6/82	19/6/82	20/6/82	20/6/82	20/6/82	20/6/82	19/6/82	20/6/82	
2	ACA–PRM 0–2	PRI–COU 3–1	DTA–DBG 3–2; Didí 21'; Enoque 53'	SAG–DCH 1–2	DTA–DBG 3–2; Januário 22'; Joãozinho 23' 44'	IHL–PET 0–1	INT–MAM 0–1	INT–MAM 0–1; Ralph '	NAC–PRO 0–0	IHL–PET 0–1; Haia 50'	PRI–COU 3–1; Amândio ' Ndala ' Ndunguidi '	ACA–PRM 0–2	NAC–PRO 0–0	SAG–DCH 1–2	16
3	27/6/82	27/6/82	26/6/82	27/6/82	27/6/82	27/6/82	27/6/82	27/6/82	27/6/82	27/6/82	27/6/82	27/6/82	26/6/82	27/6/82	
3	ACA–SAG 1–0	COU–PRM 2–3	PRO–DBG 1–1	DCH–IHL 1–2; Beto Amaro '	PET–DTA 3–0	DCH–IHL 1–2; Maria 9'; Mavó 41'	NAC–INT 1–1	MAM–PRI 1–0	NAC–INT 1–1	PET–DTA 3–0; Haia 12'; Pepé 16'	MAM–PRI 1–0	COU–PRM 2–3	PRO–DBG 1–1	ACA–SAG 1–0	17
4	4/7/82	4/7/82	3/7/82	3/7/82	3/7/82	4/7/82	3/7/82	4/7/82	3/7/82	4/7/82	3/7/82	4/7/82	4/7/82	4/7/82	
4	IHL–ACA 1–0	COU–MAM 1–4; Indú 71'	DBG–INT 3–1	DTA–DCH 3–3	DTA–DCH 3–3	IHL–ACA 1–0; Maria 35'	DBG–INT 3–1	COU–MAM 1–4; Marques 4' 59'; Vieira Dias 25'; Ndongala '	PRI–NAC 1–2	PRO–PET 1–1; Jesus 88'	PRI–NAC 1–2	PRM–SAG 2–3; Daniel ' Maluka '	PRO–PET 1–1; Jaime 18'	PRM–SAG 2–3; Rui Paulino x2 Rui Sapiri '	26
5	11/7/82	11/7/82	11/7/82	11/7/82	11/7/82	11/7/82	10/7/82	11/7/82	11/7/82	10/7/82	11/7/82	11/7/82	11/7/82	11/7/82	
5	ACA–DTA 0–0	COU–NAC 1–2	PRI–DBG 2–0	DCH–PRO 2–2	ACA–DTA 0–0	SAG–IHL 1–1	INT–PET 2–1; Eurípedes 20'; Gomes ' Raúl 89'	PRM–MAM 3–0	COU–NAC 1–2	INT–PET 2–1	PRI–DBG 2–0	PRM–MAM 3–0	DCH–PRO 2–2	SAG–IHL 1–1	17
6	17/7/82	18/7/82	18/7/82	18/7/82	17/7/82	18/7/82	18/7/82	18/7/82	18/7/82	18/7/82	18/7/82	18/7/82	17/7/82	17/7/82	
6	PRO–ACA 1–2	DBG–COU 2–0	DBG–COU 2–0	DCH–INT 1–0	DTA–SAG 0–1	PRM–IHL 2–1	DCH–INT 1–0	MAM–NAC 3–0	MAM–NAC 3–0	PET–PRI 1–1	PET–PRI 1–1	PRM–IHL 2–1	PRO–ACA 1–2	DTA–SAG 0–1	15
7	25/7/82	25/7/82	24/7/82	24/7/82	25/7/82	25/7/82	25/7/82	24/7/82	25/7/82	25/7/82	24/7/82	25/7/82	25/7/82	25/7/82	
7	ACA–INT 0–3	PET–COU 5–1	DBG–MAM 0–1	PRI–DCH 3–0	IHL–DTA 0–2 Luntadila 49'; Zola 70'	IHL–DTA 0–2	ACA–INT 0–3	DBG–MAM 0–1	NAC–PRM 2–3	PET–COU 5–1	PRI–DCH 3–0	NAC–PRM 2–3	SAG–PRO 1–3	SAG–PRO 1–3	24
8	7/8/82	26/9/82	7/8/82	26/9/82	8/8/82	8/8/82	7/8/82	8/8/82	7/8/82	8/8/82	7/8/82	8/8/82	8/8/82	7/8/82	
8	PRI–ACA 4–2; Jindungo 6'; Sayombo 63'	COU–DCH 2–1; José 5'pen. 31'	DBG–NAC 2–1	COU–DCH 2–1; Basílio 10'	PRM–DTA 1–1	PRO–IHL 0–0	INT–SAG 3–1	MAM–PET 1–2; Julião 9'	DBG–NAC 2–1	MAM–PET 1–2; Lufemba 35'; Ed.Machado 38'	PRI–ACA 4–2; Ndala 38' 47'; Amândio 45+2'; Ndunguidi 69'	PRM–DTA 1–1	PRO–IHL 0–0	INT–SAG 3–1	21
9	21/8/82	21/8/82	22/8/82	21/8/82	22/8/82	22/8/82	22/8/82	21/8/82	21/8/82	21/8/82	22/8/82	22/8/82	22/8/82	22/8/82	
9	ACA–COU 1–1	ACA–COU 1–1	PRM–DBG 2–1	DCH–MAM 0–0	DTA–PRO 1–1; Luntadila 57'	IHL–INT 0–3	IHL–INT 0–3; Eurípedes 20'; Quinito 35' 60'	DCH–MAM 0–0	PET–NAC 0–0	PET–NAC 0–0	SAG–PRI 2–3	PRM–DBG 2–1	DTA–PRO 1–1; Vata 29'	SAG–PRI 2–3	15
10	29/8/82	29/8/82	29/8/82	28/8/82	29/8/82	28/8/82	29/8/82	29/8/82	28/8/82	29/8/82	28/8/82	29/8/82	29/8/82	29/8/82	
10	MAM–ACA 3–1	COU–SAG 4–0; Vicy 3'; Marco 26'; Carlitos 30' 33'	DBG–PET 1–0	NAC–DCH 2–0	INT–DTA 1–2; Tozé 12'; Luntadila 75'	PRI–IHL 5–1; Mavó 70'	INT–DTA 1–2; Mendinho 64'	MAM–ACA 3–1	NAC–DCH 2–0	DBG–PET 1–0	PRI–IHL 5–1; Ndala 2' 11' 85'; Loth 25'; Ndunguidi 77'	PRO–PRM 0–1; Zandú 90'	PRO–PRM 0–1	COU–SAG 4–0	21
11	5/9/82	5/9/82	4/9/82	4/9/82	5/9/82	5/9/82	4/9/82	5/9/82	5/9/82	5/9/82	5/9/82	5/9/82	4/9/82	5/9/82	
11	ACA–NAC 1–3	IHL–COU 2–0	DCH–DBG 0–1; Enoque 61'	DCH–DBG 0–1	DTA–PRI 2–1; Rola 36' 60'	IHL–COU 2–0	PRO–INT 1–1; Mendinho 43'	SAG–MAM 2–2; Ralph 3' 42'	ACA–NAC 1–3	PRM–PET 1–1; Abel 3'	DTA–PRI 2–1; Ndala 49'	PRM–PET 1–1	PRO–INT 1–1; Deny 40'	SAG–MAM 2–2; Abreu 23' +pen. Lumbua 88'	18
12	12/9/82	12/9/82	12/9/82	11/9/82	12/9/82	26/9/82	11/9/82	26/9/82	12/9/82	11/9/82	12/9/82	11/9/82	12/9/82	12/9/82	
12	ACA–DBG 2–1; Sayombo 50'; Chico 68'	COU–DTA 2–0; José 58'; Marco 81'	ACA–DBG 2–1; Zezé 77'pen.	PET–DCH 3–0	COU–DTA 2–0	MAM–IHL 1–1	PRM–INT 2–0	MAM–IHL 1–1	NAC–SAG 1–1	PET–DCH 3–0; Jesus 35'pen. 40'; Lufemba 45'	PRI–PRO 1–1; Ndala 64'	PRM–INT 2–0; Daniel ' Fusso 30'	PRI–PRO 1–1; Vata 71'	NAC–SAG 1–1	16
13	19/9/82	18/9/82	19/9/82	5/9/82	19/9/82	19/9/82	17/9/82	19/9/82	19/9/82	19/9/82	17/9/82	5/9/82	18/9/82	19/9/82	
13	ACA–PET 0–1	PRO–COU 2–0	SAG–DBG 0–2; Didí 27'; Nelson 43'	DCH–PRM 1–0; Basílio '	DTA–MAM 2–0; Geovety 7'pen. Esquerdinho 90'	NAC–IHL 3–1; Zeca 47'	INT–PRI 2–2; Quinito 12' 27'	DTA–MAM 2–0	NAC–IHL 3–1; Samuel 44'; Sansão 75'; Armindo 86'	ACA–PET 0–1; Lito 19'	INT–PRI 2–2; Tandu 35'; Lourenço 60'pen.	DCH–PRM 1–0	PRO–COU 2–0; Vata pen. ? o.g.	SAG–DBG 0–2	16
14	2/10/82	2/10/82	2/10/82	2/10/82	2/10/82	2/10/82	2/10/82	2/10/82	2/10/82	2/10/82	2/10/82	2/10/82	2/10/82	2/10/82	
14	ACA–DCH 2–0; Sayombo 38' 68'	INT–COU 2–0	IHL–DBG –	ACA–DCH 2–0	NAC–DTA –	IHL–DBG –	INT–COU 2–0	PRO–MAM –	NAC–DTA –	SAG–PET 1–1	PRI–PRM 1–1	PRI–PRM 1–1	PRO–MAM –	SAG–PET 1–1	8
15	9/10/82	9/10/82	9/10/82	9/10/82	9/10/82	9/10/82	9/10/82	9/10/82	9/10/82	9/10/82	9/10/82	9/10/82	9/10/82	9/10/82	
15	PRM–ACA 2–3; Sayombo 21' 81'; Timóteo 87'	COU–PRI 0–1	DBG–DTA 2–2; Zezé 14'; Carlitos 36'	DCH–SAG 2–3; Basílio 41'; Beto Amaro 56'	DBG–DTA 2–2; Catarino 2' 20'	PET–IHL 1–0	MAM–INT 1–3	MAM–INT 1–3	PRO–NAC 2–0	PET–IHL 1–0	COU–PRI 0–1; Amândio 36'	PRM–ACA 2–3; Lázaro 28'; Zé Águas 74'	PRO–NAC 2–0; Cardoso 30'; Sorcier 41'	DCH–SAG 2–3; Rui Paulino 9' 18'; Rui Sapiri 22'	22
16	17/10/82	17/10/82	17/10/82	17/10/82	17/10/82	17/10/82	17/10/82	17/10/82	17/10/82	17/10/82	17/10/82	17/10/82	17/10/82	17/10/82	
16	SAG–ACA 1–1	PRM–COU 0–1; Marco 17'	DBG–PRO 1–1; Enoque 65'	IHL–DCH 1–0	DTA–PET 1–1; Tozé 41'	IHL–DCH 1–0; Mavó 26'	INT–NAC 2–1; Eurípedes 30'; Quinito 64'	PRI–MAM 0–1; Vieira Dias '	INT–NAC 2–1; Armindo 57'	DTA–PET 1–1; Lito 5'	PRI–MAM 0–1	PRM–COU 0–1	DBG–PRO 1–1; Vata 55'	SAG–ACA 1–1	12
17	23/10/82	23/10/82	23/10/82	23/10/82	23/10/82	23/10/82	23/10/82	23/10/82	23/10/82	23/10/82	23/10/82	23/10/82	23/10/82	23/10/82	
17	ACA–IHL 2–1; Sayombo 28' 67'	MAM–COU 1–0	INT–DBG 1–1; Enoque 80'	DCH–DTA 2–1; Beto Amaro 14'; Lucas 22'	DCH–DTA 2–1; Chico Dinis 55'	ACA–IHL 2–1; Zeca 32'	INT–DBG 1–1; Quinito 19'	MAM–COU 1–0; Julião 60'	NAC–PRI 0–0	PET–PRO 2–2; Ed.Machado 28'; Abel 51'	NAC–PRI 0–0	SAG–PRM 0–0	PET–PRO 2–2; Deny 7'; Mirage 70'	SAG–PRM 0–0	13
18	31/10/82	31/10/82	31/10/82	31/10/82	31/10/82	31/10/82	31/10/82	31/10/82	31/10/82	31/10/82	31/10/82	31/10/82	31/10/82	31/10/82	
18	DTA–ACA 1–1; Sayombo 33'	NAC–COU 3–1; Vicy 84'	DBG–PRI 0–0	PRO–DCH 1–1; Zé Amaro '	DTA–ACA 1–1; Chico Dinis 8'	IHL–SAG 2–2; Lito 32'; Pedro 72'	PET–INT 1–2; Mendinho 35'; Quinito 72'	MAM–PRM 3–1; Julião 65'pen. 85' 88'	NAC–COU 3–1; Armindo 11' 87'; Orlando 79'	PET–INT 1–2; Pepé 20'	DBG–PRI 0–0	MAM–PRM 3–1; Maluka 89'	PRO–DCH 1–1; Vata '	IHL–SAG 2–2; Abreu 2'pen. 85'	19
19	4/12/82	5/12/82	5/12/82	5/12/82	4/12/82	4/12/82	5/12/82	4/12/82	4/12/82	4/12/82	4/12/82	4/12/82	4/12/82	4/12/82	
19	ACA–PRO 2–3	COU–DBG –	COU–DBG –	INT–DCH –	SAG–DTA 0–4	IHL–PRM 1–1; Zeca 82'pen.	INT–DCH –	NAC–MAM 0–0	NAC–MAM 0–0	PRI–PET 2–6; Jesus x5' Ed.Machado '	PRI–PET 2–6; Amândio ' Loth 19'	IHL–PRM 1–1; Maluka 79'	ACA–PRO 2–3	SAG–DTA 0–4	19
20	11/12/82		12/12/82	18/12/82	11/12/82	11/12/82	11/12/82	12/12/82	18/12/82		18/12/82	18/12/82	9/12/82	9/12/82	
20	INT–ACA 1–0	COU–PET 0–1	MAM–DBG 0–0	DCH–PRI 2–1; Basílio ' Tony '	DTA–IHL –	DTA–IHL –	INT–ACA 1–0; Quinito 73'	MAM–DBG 0–0	PRM–NAC 2–1; Orlando 77'	COU–PET 0–1	DCH–PRI 2–1 <loth '	PRM–NAC 2–1; Daniel 63'; Cabinda 66' o.g.	PRO–SAG 2–1; Santinho 22' 52'	PRO–SAG 2–1; Vicky 25'	11
21	22/12/82	22/12/82	22/12/82	22/12/82	22/12/82	19/12/82	22/12/82	23/12/82	22/12/82	23/12/82	22/12/82	22/12/82	19/12/82	22/12/82	
21	ACA–PRI –	DCH–COU –	NAC–DBG –	DCH–COU –	DTA–PRM –	IHL–PRO –	SAG–INT –	PET–MAM 2–1; Maria 54'	NAC–DBG –	PET–MAM 2–1; Lufemba 17'; Ed.Machado 40'	ACA–PRI –	DTA–PRM –	IHL–PRO –	SAG–INT –	3
22			8/1/83	9/1/83	6/1/83	8/1/83	8/1/83	9/1/83	9/1/83	9/1/83	9/1/83	8/1/83	6/1/83	9/1/83	
22	COU–ACA 0–3	COU–ACA 0–3	DBG–PRM 3–3; Enoque 3' 30'; Zezé 72'	MAM–DCH 1–1; Lucas 15'	PRO–DTA 5–2	INT–IHL 2–0	INT–IHL 2–0; Mendinho 11' 31'	MAM–DCH 1–1; Julião 5'pen.	NAC–PET 1–1; J.Victor 72'	NAC–PET 1–1; Abel 89'	PRI–SAG 7–2; Ndunguidi 32' 60' 75' 80'; Zeca 37'; Alves 50'; N.Kwanza 55'	DBG–PRM 3–3; Sarmento 39'; Fidèle 50' 89'	PRO–DTA 5–2	PRI–SAG 7–2; Abreu ' Rui Paulino 40'	31
23	16/1/83	16/1/83	16/1/83		15/1/83	15/1/83	15/1/83	16/1/83		16/1/83	15/1/83	16/1/83	16/1/83	16/1/83	
23	ACA–MAM –	SAG–COU –	PET–DBG 3–1	DCH–NAC 0–0	DTA–INT 1–0; Luntadila 55'	IHL–PRI –	DTA–INT 1–0	ACA–MAM –	DCH–NAC 0–0	PET–DBG 3–1; Chico Afonso 25'; Porto 30'	IHL–PRI –	PRM–PRO 2–1; Maluka 24'; Fidèle 35'	PRM–PRO 2–1; Deny 60'	SAG–COU –	8
24	23/1/83		23/1/83	23/1/83	23/1/83		20/1/83	23/1/83	23/1/83	22/1/83	23/1/83	22/1/83	20/1/83	23/1/83	
24	NAC–ACA 2–0	COU–IHL 2–2	DBG–DCH 1–1	DBG–DCH 1–1	PRI–DTA 1–1; Rola 19'	COU–IHL 2–2	INT–PRO –	MAM–SAG 5–2; Vieira Dias 30'; Julião 49' 53' ? ?	NAC–ACA 2–0; Orlando 27'; Armindo 54'	PET–PRM 7–6; Avelino 7'; Jesus 21' 44' 51' 71'; Chico Afonso 27'; Abel 89'	PRI–DTA 1–1; N.Kwanza 16'	PET–PRM 7–6; Maluka 8'; Abreu 47'; Fdèle 49' 63'; Daniel 76'; Sarmento 79'	INT–PRO –	MAM–SAG 5–2; Abreu 20'; Esquerdinho 89'	30
25	30/1/83	29/1/83	30/1/83		29/1/83	29/1/83	30/1/83	29/1/83			28/1/83	30/1/83	28/1/83		
25	DBG–ACA 0–1; Sayombo 52'	DTA–COU 1–2; Malungo 30'pen. Carlitos 80'	DBG–ACA 0–1	DCH–PET 2–2; Basílio ' Beto Amaro '	DTA–COU 1–2; Geovety 70'pen.	IHL–MAM 2–0; Feijó 8'	INT–PRM 2–2; Quinito 57'; Mendinho 80'	IHL–MAM 2–0	SAG–NAC –	DCH–PET 2–2; Jesus x2	PRO–PRI 2–4; Ndunguidi 8' ? pen' Ed.André o.g.	INT–PRM 2–2; Maluka 45'	PRO–PRI 2–4; Santinho ' Vata pen.	SAG–NAC –	20
26	5/2/83		6/2/83	6/2/83	6/2/83		4/2/83	6/2/83		5/2/83	4/2/83	6/2/83		6/2/83	
26	PET–ACA 2–0	COU–PRO –	DBG–SAG 3–1; Enoque 40' 50' 60'	PRM–DCH 1–1; Lucas 7'	MAM–DTA –	IHL–NAC –	PRI–INT 2–0	MAM–DTA –	IHL–NAC –	PET–ACA 2–0; Jesus 60'pen. 65'	PRI–INT 2–0; Ndunguidi 11'; Alves 59'	PRM–DCH 1–1; Sarmento 90+13'	COU–PRO –	DBG–SAG 3–1; Abreu 80'	10
T															

=== Top scorers ===
As of 6 February 1982

Rank	Scorer	Club	Goals
1	(Angola) Jesus	Petro de Luanda	21
2	(Angola) Sayombo	Académica Lobito	20
3	(Angola) Julião	Mambroa	18
4	(Angola) Vata	Progresso	16
5	(Angola) Ndunguidi	1º de Agosto	13
6	(Angola) Ndala	1º de Agosto	12
6	(Angola) Quinito	Inter Luanda	12
6	(Angola) Maluka	1º de Maio	12

=== Most goals scored in a single match ===
As of 6 February 1983

Player	For	Against	Result	Round	Date
5 goals
(Angola) Jesus	Petro de Luanda	1º de Agosto	2-6	19	Sat, 04 Dec 1982
4 goals (Poker)
(Angola) Ndunguidi	1º de Agosto	Sagrada Esperança	7-2	22	Sun, 09 Jan 1983
(Angola) Jesus	Petro de Luanda	1º de Maio	7-6	24	Sat, 22 Jan 1983
(Angola) Julião	Mambroa	Sagrada Esperança	5-2	24	Sun, 23 Jan 1983
3 goals (Hat-trick)
(Angola) Ndala	1º de Agosto	Inter da Huíla	5-1	10	Sat, 28 Aug 1982
(Angola) Julião	Mambroa	1º de Maio	3-1	18	Sat, 30 Oct 1982
(Angola) Vata	Progresso	TAAG	5-2	22	Thu, 06 Jan 1983
(Angola) Enoque	Desp de Benguela	Sagrada Esperança	3-1	26	Sun, 06 Feb 1983

== Season statistics ==
=== Top scorer ===
- (Angola) Osvaldo Saturnino Jesus

== Champions ==
1982 Girabola winner
Atlético Petróleos de Luanda
1st title

Squad: Abel, Afonso, Avelino, Bodú, Chico Afonso, Dico, Eduardo Machado, Franco, Haia, Jesus, Kuba, Lito, Lufemba, Makuéria, Moreno, Nsumbo, Pepé, Porto, Rui Gomes, Tonel, Tozé
Head coach: Antônio Clemente
