= G.D. Interclube (Huíla) =

Angolan sports club

Inter da Huíla
- Full name: Grupo Desportivo Interclube da Huíla
- Founded: 28 February 1977; 48 years ago
- Ground: Estádio do Ferroviário da Huíla, Lubango
- Chairman: José Mundial
- League: Girabola
Home colours

Grupo Desportivo Interclube da Huíla or simply Inter da Huíla, is an Angolan sports club from the city of Lubango.

Just like its counterpart from Luanda, the club is attached to the Angolan police force.

In 2004, the Angolan Ministry of the Interior ruled that Inter de Luanda was the only club authorized to participate in the Girabola. Subsequently, the club withdrew from senior competition and focused on their youth academy.

== Manager history and performance ==
Season	Coach	L2	L1	C	Coach	L2	L1	C
1982	(Angola) Eduardo Laurindo da Silva				(Angola) José Manuel		9th	
1992	?				(Angola) Raimundo Fernandes			
1996	(Portugal) Clemente Gabriel							
